= List of early landmark court cases =

This is a list of early significant and precedent setting judicial decisions in English law:

== Anglo Norman cases ==
- Ealdred v High Sheriff of Yorkshire (c.1068)
- Wulfstan v Thomas (1070)
- R v Roger de Breteuil
- Trial of Penenden Heath (1071) regarded by some commentators as "one of the most important events in the early history of English Law because of the light it sheds on the relationship between Norman Law and English Law" with the trial being a possible indication of Norman respect for Anglo-Saxon legal history.
- Odo of Bayeux v Lanfranc (1071) appeal against the Trial of Penenden Heath and the first case known where the judge called on both Anglo-Saxon and Norman juristic experts.
- The King v Tavistock
- R v Ralph Breton (1075), one of the earliest reported criminal trials in English law.
- Abbot Scotland v Hamo the Sherrif (1076)
- Bishop Odo v Walter, Abbot of Evesham (1077)
- Walter v Saint Wulfstan.

== Common Law cases (post 1154) ==
- Furrer v Snelling (1220) early property and contracts precedent
- Arundels Case 1250
- (The first Year Books, which deal with cases, were published 1268)
- John v Anon (1290) early Chancellry case in trusts.
- Stapleton v Snayth established the first ratio of what would become duty of care with regard to property damage caused by waters.
- Beneyt v Brokkere (1358) established the first ratio of what would become duty of care with regard to damage caused by animals.
- Haxey's case is a leading case in English law that established the right to free speech within Parliament.
- Beaulieu v Finglam (1401) early tort case. establishing principle of liability.
- Case of the Thorns (1466) established a tort of trespass to property.
- Luckers Case'
- Carrier's Case (1473) duty of a bailee, right of forfeiture to the crown.
- R v Earl of Northumberland (1568) established royal prerogative on all gold deposits in the realm.
- Shelley's Case (1581) early case setting rules for future interests in real property and trusts
- Hext v Yeomans (1583) early defamation case wherein the Court found that slander do not lie upon inferences.
- Case of the Swans (1592) Exchequer of Pleas establishing wild animals, cannot be given by transfer.
- Eaton v Allen (1598) early defamation case.
- Mouse's case (1608), establish the defense of necessity in tort
