= List of Supreme Court of Judicature cases =

This is a chronological list of notable cases decided by the Senior Courts of England and Wales – that is, cases from the High Court of Justice of England and Wales, Court of Appeal of England and Wales, and Crown Court.

== Pre-1800 ==
- Haxey's case (1397) Rot. Parl. (iii) 434
- Case of the Thorns (1466) YB 6 Ed 4, 7a pl 18. Early precedent for negligence and trespass to land.
- R v Earl of Northumberland (1568) Crown right to minerals precedent.
- Case of the Swans (1592) Crown right to wildlife precedent
- Mouse's case(1602) precedent establishing the defense of Necessity on Tort
- Booty v Barnaby (1687)
- Entick v Carrington [1765] EWHC J98 (KB) (2 November 1765), High Court (England and Wales)

== 1800–1899 ==
- Adams v. Lindsell [1818] EWHC J59 (KB) (5 June 1818), High Court (England and Wales)
- Vaughn v. Menlove (1837). 132 E.R. 490 (C.P.)
- Foss v Harbottle (1843) 2 Hare 461, 67 ER 189
- Hadley v. Baxendale [1854] EWHC J70 (Exch) (23 February 1854), High Court (England and Wales)
- Blyth v. Company Proprietors of the Birmingham Water Works [1856] EWHC J65 (Exch) (6 February 1856), High Court (England and Wales)
- Raffles v. Wichelhaus [1864] EWHC J19 (Exch) (20 January 1864), High Court (England and Wales)
- Parker v. South Eastern Railway Company (1877), L.R. 2 C.P.D. 416
- Cundy v Lindsay (1878) 3 App Cas 459
- Household Fire & Carriage Account Insurance Co. Ltd. v. Grant (1879), 4 Exch. Div. 216
- R v. Dudley and Stephens (1884) 14 King's Bench Division 273
- The Moorcock (1889), 14 Probate Division 64
- Kenrick v. Lawrence [1890] QBD
- Henthorn v. Fraser [1892] 2 Ch. 27
- Carlill v. Carbolic Smoke Ball Company [1892] EWCA Civ 1 (7 December 1892), Court of Appeal (England and Wales)
- Hollingrake v. Truswell [1894] 3 Ch. 420
- Wilkinson v Downton [1897] 2 Q.B. 57: Intentional infliction of nervous shock
- Simcoe v. Pethick, 2 Q.B. 55(1898). widely cited as an important precedent for public land rights in England.

== 1900–1999 ==
- Automatic Self-Cleansing Filter Syndicate Co Ltd v Cuninghame, [1906] 2 Ch. 34 (C.A.): duty of corporate directors
- University of London Press, Ltd. v. University Tutorial Press, Ltd. [1916] 2 Ch. 601
- Balfour v. Balfour [1919] 2 K.B. 571
- Rose and Frank v. J.R. Crompton and Brothers Ltd. [1924] UKHL 2 (5 December 1924), House of Lords (UK)
- Foley v. Classique Coaches Ltd. [1934] 2 K.B. 1
- Young v Bristol Aeroplane Co Ltd [1944] KB 718
- Associated Provincial Picture Houses v. Wednesbury Corporation [1947] EWCA Civ 1, Court of Appeal (England and Wales)
- Central London Property Trust Ltd v High Trees House Ltd [1947] K.B. 130.
- Olley v Marlborough Court Hotel [1949] 1 K.B. 532.
- Shanklin Pier Ltd v Detel Products Ltd, [1951] 2 KB 854
- Pharmaceutical Society of Great Britain v. Boots Cash Chemists (Southern) Ltd. [1953] EWCA Civ 6 (5 February 1953), Court of Appeal (England and Wales)
- Entores Ltd v Miles Far East Corporation [1955] EWCA Civ 3 (17 May 1955), Court of Appeal (England and Wales)
- Fisher v Bell [1960] 3 W.L.R. 919
- Hong Kong Fir v. Kawasaki Kisen Kaisha Ltd. [1961] EWCA Civ 7 (20 December 1961), Court of Appeal (England and Wales)
- R v Waterfield, [1963] 3 All E.R. 659
- Edwards v. Skyways Ltd. [1964] 1 All E.R. 494
- Jones v. Padavatton [1968] EWCA Civ 4 (29 November 1968), Court of Appeal (England and Wales)
- Gould v. Gould [1969] 3 All E.R. 728
- Lewis v Averay [1971] EWCA Civ 4 (22 July 1971), Court of Appeal (England and Wales)
- Incorporated Council of Law Reporting for England and Wales v Attorney-General & Another [1971] EWCA Civ 13 (14 October 1971), Court of Appeal (England and Wales)

== 2000 – present ==
- R v Grillo and Grillo

== See also ==
- List of cases involving Lord Denning
- List of Judicial Committee of the Privy Council cases
- List of House of Lords cases
