= Hamo the Steward =

Anglo-Norman nobleman (fl. 1071-76)

Hamo the Steward, the Sheriff of Kent was a leading person during the 11th century Norman Conquest of England.

Hamo had extensive land holdings in Essex, Kent and Surrey. He was a judge at Penenden in case between Lanfranc and Odo of Bayeux in 1071 and was himself sued in (1076), when acting as the king's agent and with the king's license, look lands for Odo of Bayeux, the king's brother.
