= Wulfstan v Thomas =

Stained glass at Long Itchington depicting a later telling of the event: Lanfranc ordered Wulfstan to surrender his crozier and ring and make way for a Norman bishop. Wulfstan refused, saying, 'You did not grant me my pastoral staff, and I will not surrender it to you.' He walked to the tomb of Edward the Confessor and said, 'Edward, you gave me my staff, and now I cannot hold it, because of the king. So I commit it to you. And if you can keep it, then defend it.' He then rammed it into the carvings on the tombstone. All tried to prise the staff from the tomb but it was stuck fast. But Wulfstan lifted his staff off with ease. King William relented and confirmed Wulfstan in office.

Wulfstan v Thomas (Note: Spoken as "Wulfstan and Thomas." The v in the case title is an abbreviation of the Latin in versus, but is normally pronounced "and" for civil cases in England and Wales.) was an early court case in English law. Bishop Wulstan, later Saint Wulfstan, was appealing to the new king against the taking of estates that had belonged to the Cathedral at Worcester.

== Background ==
Prior to the Norman Conquest a former bishop, Ealdred, had taken in personum (as private property) various estates that had belonged to the diocese of Worcester, when he left to become the Bishop at York. Following the death of Ealdred these estates were now held by the Bishopric of York.

In this case the new Bishop of Worcester was seeking from William the Conqueror, the new Norman king, that Thomas the Bishop of York restore the lands that had belonged to Worcester.

This was a very brave move as Thomas the new bishop at York was a favourite of William and trusted disciple of William's brother Odo of Bayeux.

== Result ==
The Plaint was successful.

The court cases can be viewed as a part of a large collection of pleadings against a process of Normanization that within a decade saw 64% of land in England consolidated into the hands of just 150 individuals, and many of the nobility deprived of their estates.

== See also ==
- Trial of Penenden Heath (1071)
- Odo of Bayeux v Lanfranc (1071)
