= Parliamentary privilege =

Legal immunity enjoyed by members of certain legislatures

Parliamentary privilege is a legal immunity enjoyed by members of certain legislatures, beginning at the end of the middle ages with the English Parliament and spreading throughout its colonies in the following centuries, in which legislators are granted protection against civil or criminal liability for actions done or statements made in the course of their legislative duties. It is common in countries whose constitutions are based on the Westminster system.

== Origins ==
In the United Kingdom, parliamentary privilege allows members of the House of Lords and House of Commons to speak freely during ordinary parliamentary proceedings without fear of legal action on the grounds of slander, contempt of court or breaching the Official Secrets Act. It also means that members of Parliament cannot be arrested on civil matters for statements made or acts undertaken as an MP within the grounds of the Palace of Westminster, on the condition that such statements or acts occur as part of a proceeding in Parliament—for example, as a question to the Prime Minister in the House of Commons. This allows Members to raise questions or debate issues which could slander an individual, interfere with an ongoing court case or threaten to reveal state secrets, such as in the Zircon affair or several cases mentioned by the Labour MP Tam Dalyell.

There is no immunity from arrest on criminal grounds, nor does the civil privilege entirely extend to the devolved administrations in Scotland or Wales. A consequence of the privilege of free speech is that legislators in Westminster systems are forbidden by conventions of their House from uttering certain words, or implying that another member is lying. (See unparliamentary language.)

The rights and privileges of members are overseen by the powerful Commons Select Committee of Privileges. If a member of the House is in breach of the rules then he/she can be suspended or even expelled from the House. Such past breaches have included giving false evidence before a committee of the House and the taking of bribes by members.

Similar rights apply in other Westminster system countries such as Canada, New Zealand, and Australia.

Parliamentary privilege is controversial because of its potential for abuse; a member can use privilege to make damaging allegations that would ordinarily be discouraged by defamation laws, whether or not those allegations have a strong foundation. A member could, even more seriously, undermine national security and/or the safety of an ongoing military or covert operation or undermine relations with a foreign state by releasing sensitive military or diplomatic information.

== By country ==
=== Australia ===
Like in other countries, Parliamentary privilege in Australia is granted to those who participate in “proceedings in Parliament” from outside interference or suit.

Freedom of speech is considered one of the most important privileges. Article 9 of the Bill of Rights 1689 states: "That the freedom of speech and debates or proceedings in Parliament ought not to be impeached or questioned in any Court or place out of Parliament."

Freedom from prosecution is incorporated in Australian law by section 49 of the Constitution and by section 16 of the Parliamentary Privileges Act 1987.

Members of parliament taking part in proceedings in parliament enjoy absolute privilege. They may not be prosecuted if they make defamatory statements of an opponent during the heat of debate, nor can they be prosecuted if they make a statement that would be considered a criminal offence outside of the parliamentary chamber.

The privilege of freedom of speech is also granted to those taking part in ‘proceedings in parliament’ such as witnesses who give evidence to properly constituted parliamentary committees.

=== Canada ===
In Canada, the Senate and House of Commons and provincial legislative assemblies follow the definition of parliamentary privilege offered by the British parliamentary authority, Erskine May's Treatise on The Law, Privileges, Proceedings and Usage of Parliament, which defines parliamentary privilege as "the sum of the peculiar rights enjoyed by each House collectively as a constituent part of the High Court of Parliament, and by Members of each house individually, without which they could not discharge their function... the privileges of Parliament are rights which are absolutely necessary for the due execution of its powers. They are enjoyed by individual Members, because the House cannot perform its functions without unimpeded use of the service of its Members, and by each House for the protection of its members and the vindication of its own authority and dignity." Parliamentary privilege can therefore be claimed by Members individually or by the House collectively.

Initially, the rule for when parliamentary privilege applies is that it cannot exceed the powers, privileges and immunities of the imperial parliament as it stood in 1867, when the first constitution was written. However, in 1875, this rule was amended by the Parliament of Canada Act, 1875, to specify that it cannot exceed the powers, privileges and immunities of the parliament of the United Kingdom at the time of the passing of Canadian legislation defining those powers, privileges and immunities. This amendment was necessary because the British parliament acquired the right to examine witnesses on oath only in 1871, and the Canadian parliament would not have enjoyed this right if its powers were limited to those extant in 1867.

Individual parliamentary privileges include:

1. Freedom of speech
2. Freedom from arrest in civil action
3. Exemption from jury duty
4. Exemption from appearing as a witness
5. Freedom from obstruction, interference, intimidation and molestation

Collective parliamentary privileges include:

1. Power to discipline
2. Regulation of the House's internal affairs
3. Management of employees
4. Authority to maintain the attendance and service of Members
5. Right to institute inquiries and to call witnesses and demand papers
6. Right to administer oaths to witnesses
7. Right to publish papers containing defamatory material

The Supreme Court of Canada has previously dealt with the question of parliamentary privilege in New Brunswick Broadcasting Co. v. Nova Scotia (Speaker of the House of Assembly). In that case, the Court made these observations about parliamentary privilege:

"Privilege" in this context denotes the legal exemption from some duty, burden, attendance or liability to which others are subject. It has long been accepted that in order to perform their functions, legislative bodies require certain privileges relating to the conduct of their business. It has also long been accepted that these privileges must be held absolutely and constitutionally if they are to be effective; the legislative branch of our government must enjoy a certain autonomy which even the Crown and the courts cannot touch. The privileges attaching to colonial legislatures arose from common law. Modelled on the British Parliament, they were deemed to possess such powers and authority as are necessarily incidental to their proper functioning. These privileges were governed by the principle of necessity rather than by historical incident, and thus may not exactly replicate the powers and privileges found in the United Kingdom.

Recent cases of parliamentary privilege in Canada adjudicated by the courts include:

1. 1993: New Brunswick Broadcasting Co. v. Nova Scotia (Speaker of the House of Assembly), where the courts held parliament could restrict who could enter the parliamentary precincts.
2. 1999: Zundel v. Boudria, et al., where the courts held parliament could restrict who could enter the parliamentary precincts.
3. 2001: Ontario (Speaker of the Legislative Assembly) v. Ontario (Human Rights Commission), where the courts held the actions of the provincial legislative assembly were immune from review by other government bodies including the Human Rights Commission.
4. 2005: Canada (House of Commons) v. Vaid, where the Supreme Court of Canada analyzed the scope of parliamentary privilege and the role of courts in deciding its existence.
5. 2018: Chagnon v. Syndicat de la fonction publique et parapublique du Québec, where a majority of the Supreme Court of Canada determined that parliamentary privilege over the management of employees did not extend to immunizing the Quebec legislature from the labour relations scheme governing its security guards.

=== India ===
The government of India, based largely on the Westminster model, grants limited immunity from legal proceedings to members of Parliament and State Legislature under Articles 105 and 194 respectively, of the Indian Constitution. Article 105(2) reads as follows:

No member of Parliament shall be liable to any proceedings in any court in respect of anything said or any vote given by him in Parliament or any committee thereof, and no person shall be so liable in respect of the publication by or under the authority of either House of Parliament of any report, paper, votes or proceedings.

=== Ireland ===
In Ireland, as in other countries, members of the Oireachtas, Irish parliament, are granted privileges to perform their constitutional functions. These privileges are enshrined in Article 15 of the Constitution.

Freedom of speech is one of the most important and fundamental privileges enjoyed by Irish parliamentarians. Article 15.12 of the Constitution provides that — “All official reports and publications of the Oireachtas or of either House thereof and utterances made in either House wherever published shall be privileged”.

However, an Appendix to Article 15, Standing Order 59, places limits on freedom of speech with regards to potential defamation. It states:

(1) "A member shall not make an utterance in the nature of being defamatory and where a member makes such an utterance it may be prima facie an abuse of privilege, subject to the provisions of this Standing Order."

The standing order further states that any utterance that is known to be defamatory must immediately be withdrawn. If the member of parliament does not withdraw the statement it is viewed as an act of disorder and may be referred to the Committee on Procedure and Privileges for review.

=== New Zealand ===
The New Zealand Parliament accords its members parliamentary privilege like its British counterpart, preventing members for being sued or prosecuted for anything that was said on the floor while in session.

=== Singapore ===
In Singapore, parliamentary privileges are statutorily accorded under the Parliament (Privileges, Immunities and Powers) Act 1962. The Parliament of Singapore accords parliamentary privilege to its members, preventing them from being sued or prosecuted for anything said on the floor while parliament is in session, or during any parliamentary committee meetings.

However, section 20 of the Parliament (Privileges, Immunities and Powers) Act 1962 allows the Parliament of Singapore to imprison, fine, reprimand, or suspend from Parliament any member found to have engaged in "abuse of privilege." This has provided a powerful tool for the ruling People's Action Party to suppress and punish criticism in or about Parliament by opposition members.

=== South Africa ===
Parliamentary privilege has existed in South Africa since the first legislatures were established in the 1850s. Early laws on the subject included the Cape Colony's Freedom of Speech in Parliament Act 1854, and Natal's Law to Secure Freedom of Speech and Debates or Proceedings in the Legislative Council (1857) and Privileges of Parliament Act 1895.

The South Africa Act 1909, which established the Union of South Africa in 1910, provided that the Cape's system of parliamentary privilege would apply to the Union's parliament until such time as it made its own rules. This served as an interim measure until the Powers and Privileges of Parliament Act 1911 was passed. After the country became a republic in 1961, the Act was replaced with the Powers and Privileges of Parliament Act 1963, which, in turn, was replaced with the Powers, Privileges and Immunities of Parliament and Provincial Legislatures Act 2003.

The 1993 'interim' Constitution expressly protected members of the National Assembly and the Senate against civil or criminal action for anything which he or she said, produced, submitted or revealed in or before parliament or any of its committees, and gave similar protection to members of provincial legislatures. The 1996 Constitution contains similar provisions.

Helen Suzman used parliamentary privilege in her anti-apartheid campaigning. Helen Suzman reported during a 1994 interview that she was able to get around state of emergency rules applied against press reporting of violence in the country by asking questions in parliament about the subjects that the press were forbidden from talking about. South African legislation allowed anything said in parliament to be published in spite of emergency legislation. She commented on the hypocrisy of anti-apartheid campaigners criticising her for fighting apartheid from the inside in this way, yet publishing information revealed by her by means of parliamentary privilege.

=== United Kingdom ===
The ancient and undoubted rights and privileges of the Commons are claimed by the Speaker at the beginning of each new Parliament. The privileges, asserted in general terms by the Bill of Rights 1689, are only codified in Erskine May: Parliamentary Practice, which is not strictly speaking a source of law, and the House itself is the only judge of its own privileges. Most of those specifically claimed are practically obsolete, but others remain very real:

1. Freedom of speech (members speaking in the House are immune to legal action for their speeches, including defamation and contempt of court);
2. Freedom from arrest in civil matters (practically obsolete);
3. Access of the Commons to the Crown (via the Speaker); and
4. That "the most favourable construction should be placed upon the deliberations of the Commons".

Privileges not specifically mentioned:

1. Right of the House to regulate its own composition (although election petitions are now determined by the ordinary courts and MPs imprisoned on conviction for crimes would normally now be recalled by their electors or disqualified as a matter of law, the House retains the right to expel members for any reason);
2. Right of the House to regulate its own internal proceedings, both as to matters and procedures;
3. Right to punish members and "strangers" for breach of privilege and contempt;
4. Right of freedom from interference (although members are no longer immune from all civil actions).

==== Parliamentary papers ====
There is an absolute common law privilege for papers circulated among MPs by order of the House (Lake v. King (1667) 1 Saunders 131). This is extended to all papers published under the House's authority, and to correct copies by the Parliamentary Papers Act 1840. The Act also extends qualified privilege to extracts, and several other Acts extend qualified privilege to broadcasts and reports made without malice.

==== Select committees ====
In addition to applying to members' speech within the chamber, parliamentary privilege also applies to select committees. Written and oral evidence given to, and published by these committees is also subject to the same absolute privilege as parliamentary papers. This means that any evidence given by a witness to a select committee may not be used against them or any other person in a court of law, whether for civil or criminal proceedings. This privilege only applies, however, if the committee has formally accepted it as evidence and does not apply to materials published before they were given to the committee.

=== United States ===
In the United States, the Speech or Debate Clause in Article One of the United States Constitution provides for a similar privilege, and many state constitutions provide similar clauses for their state legislatures.

== Leading cases ==
- Sir Thomas Haxey – free speech [1397]
- Richard Strode (Privilege of Parliament Act) [1512]
- George Ferrers – debt default [1542]
- Stockdale v. Hansard – defamation by Hansard [1839]
- Charles Bradlaugh – Oath of Allegiance [1880]
- Duncan Sandys – free speech [1938]
- Archibald Maule Ramsay – treason [1940]
- Garry Allighan – defamation [1947]
- Duncan Campbell (the Zircon affair) – free speech [1986]
- Neil Hamilton – cash for questions [1994]
- Bill Heffernan – free speech [2002]
- "Superinjunction" controversy:
  - The Guardian–Trafigura affair – Right of the media to report proceedings covered by parliamentary privilege [2009]
  - Fred Goodwin v News Group Newspapers Ltd and VBN and CTB v News Group Newspapers (Ryan Giggs) – Right of the media to report on anonymised court injunctions; parliamentary privilege used to allow the media to report the existence of injunctions and the parties involved [2011]
  - An unnamed injunction in 2006 granted preventing participants of a case from speaking to individuals including "Members of Parliament, journalists, lawyers" on toxic chemicals in passenger ship water tanks and resulting illnesses – Right of constituents to speak to their MPs; existence revealed in a parliamentary question several years later. [2011]
- Ryan Giggs, a footballer suspected of committing adultery with Imogen Thomas, a Big Brother contestant, sought an injunction to prevent the media talking about the issue. He took legal action against Twitter, given that a Twitter user had named him among several celebrities as having taken out super-injunctions. Large numbers of people retweeted the comments and eventually, the Liberal Democrat MP John Hemming used parliamentary privilege to name Ryan Giggs. No prosecutions against Twitter users were pursued, firstly because of the impracticality of pursuing things and secondly because of the public outcry about celebrities using super-injunctions to evade accountability for sleazy behaviour.
- Colum Eastwood named Soldier F in Parliament in 2021. Soldier F's name is strictly kept out of the British press to avoid interference with court cases involving his conduct on Bloody Sunday (1972).
- In the Republic of Ireland, Denis O'Brien lost a 2017 High Court case seeking to reprimand two TDs and RTÉ. After O'Brien had sought an injunction preventing RTÉ broadcasting his banking details, TDs Catherine Murphy and Pearse Doherty disclosed the details in Dáil Éireann speeches which were broadcast by RTÉ.

== See also ==
- Speech or Debate Clause of the United States Constitution
- Executive privilege
