= Canadian sovereignty =

Power of Canada to govern itself

The location of Canada

The sovereignty of Canada is, in legal terms, the power of Canada to govern itself and its subjects; it is the ultimate source of Canada's law and order. Sovereignty is also a major cultural matter in Canada. Several matters currently define Canadian sovereignty: the Canadian monarchy, telecommunication, the autonomy of the provinces, and Canada's Arctic border.

Canada is a democratic monarchy. Though unitary, the Canadian Crown is also "divided" equally among the country's 11 jurisdictions: one federal (wherein the sovereign is represented by the governor general) and 10 provincial (the monarch being represented in each by a lieutenant governor). The greater autonomy of each province and territory within the construct of Canadian federalism is also important to Canadian sovereignty. Québec has twice voted on seceding from Canada. Sovereignty has also been an issue for some of Canada's indigenous peoples.

Canada's Telecommunications Act "specifies the need for national ownership and control of Canadian carriers".

Since 2005, arctic ice melting in Northern Canada has caused issues affecting Canadian sovereignty, as some arctic countries have come in conflict over who owns certain areas in the oil-rich Arctic.

== History ==
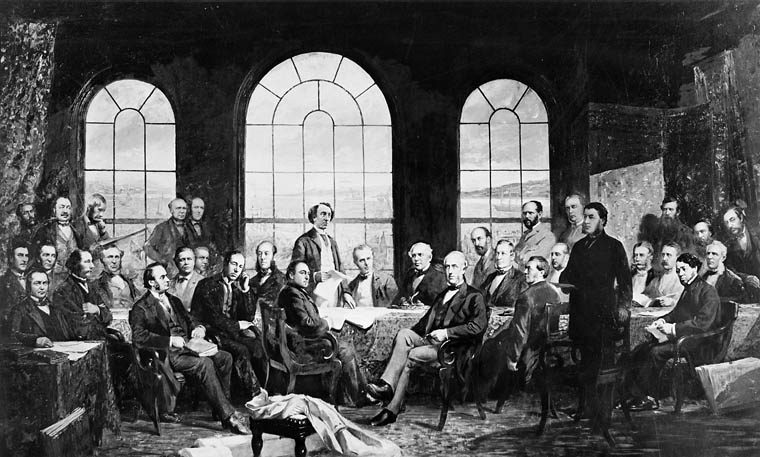
The Fathers of Confederation at the constitutional conference in Quebec, 1864

The origins of Canada's sovereignty lie in the constitutional English and British crowns and the absolute French crown establishing, in the 17th and 18th centuries, governmental institutions in areas that today comprise Canada. As such, Canada was affected by the conflicts in England in the 17th century, between monarch and parliament, over which was the ultimate authority, culminating in the Glorious Revolution of 1688 and the Bill of Rights, 1689, which is today part of Canadian law. With the enactment of the British North America Act, 1867, the modern polity of Canada was founded and was granted self-government. Sovereignty was "carried over" into Canadian constitutional law, but the country's government and legislature were still under the authority of the monarch in her British Council and parliament at Westminster and the final court of appeal was the Judicial Committee of the Privy Council. According to the Supreme Court of Canada, Canadian "sovereignty was acquired in the period between its separate signature of the Treaty of Versailles in 1919 and the Statute of Westminster, 1931", which brought the Balfour Declaration of 1926 into law and its enactment is considered to be moment when the separate Canadian monarchy was established. The Constitution Act, 1982, removed the final few reliances Canada had on the British Parliament, making Canada a completely sovereign nation.

== Canadian monarchy ==
Charles III, King of Canada, as well as of the United Kingdom and 13 other Commonwealth realms, is the country's monarch and, as such, is the focus of the Oath of Allegiance taken by various government officials, civil servants, military members, and new citizens.

The King is constitutionally vested with legislative, executive, and judicial power. However, sovereignty in Canada has never rested solely with the monarch, due to the constitutional theories of Edward Coke, refined by Albert Venn Dicey, and the Bill of Rights 1689, later inherited by Canada, establishing the principle of parliamentary sovereignty; the British model of legislative sovereignty vesting in the king-in-parliament. This was later superseded by the Canadian Charter of Rights and Freedoms (within the Constitution Act, 1982), which brought into Canada the American notion of the supremacy of the law. Nonetheless, the monarch is still the sovereign of Canada.

The crest of the royal coat of arms of Canada, symbolizing Canadian sovereignty

The term the Crown is used to represent the power of the monarch and the royal authority is symbolized by elements included in the insignia of various government institutions, the main one being the crest of the royal coat of arms of Canada—a gold lion standing on a wreath of the official colours of Canada, wearing the royal crown, and holding a red maple leaf in its right paw—a symbol of Canadian sovereignty. The King's coat of arms themselves are considered a symbol of Canada's sovereignty. The authority of the monarch is also communicated through the names of various government institutions, such as Court of King's Bench and King's Printer.

In Canada's federal system, the head of state is not a part of either the federal or provincial jurisdictions; the King reigns impartially over the country as a whole, meaning the sovereignty of each jurisdiction is passed on not by the federal viceroy or the Canadian Parliament, but through the Crown itself. Thus, the Crown is "divided" into 11 legal jurisdictions, or 11 "crowns"—one federal and 10 provincial—and the monarch similarly is the personification of each provincial state. The Fathers of Confederation viewed this system of constitutional monarchy as a bulwark against any potential fracturing of the Canadian Confederation. As the institution from which the power of the state flows, the terms the Crown in Right of Canada, His Majesty in Right of Canada, and the King in Right of Canada or any of those terms with the name of a province replacing Canada, may also be used to refer to the entire executive of the government in each jurisdiction.

I want the Crown to be seen as a symbol of national sovereignty belonging to all. It is not only a link between Commonwealth nations, but, between Canadian citizens of every national origin and ancestry.

— Elizabeth II, Queen of Canada, Toronto, Ontario, 1973

This division of sovereignty, with the federal and provincial parliaments each having the sovereign ability to make law, as granted by the Constitution Act, 1867, can lead to conflicts over jurisdiction, which the courts resolve by ruling on which source of sovereign power trumps the other.

Per the convention of sovereign immunity, the monarch, whether in his federal or provincial jurisdictions, is free from the scope of foreign courts. Domestically, the Crown in each sphere within Canadian Confederation is also taken to be immune from the Crown in the other spheres; though, the degree to which has changed with the enactment of certain laws and changes in legal thinking.

=== Aboriginal peoples ===
British colonial policy in what is today Canada acknowledged Indigenous tribes as sovereign nations. After Confederation in 1867, the federal approach moved toward the earlier, absolute French Crown's desire for cultural assimilation and Canadian government policy continued that way for approximately a century, until policy shifted to self-determination for Indigenous peoples, to be achieved through treaties and self-government agreements.

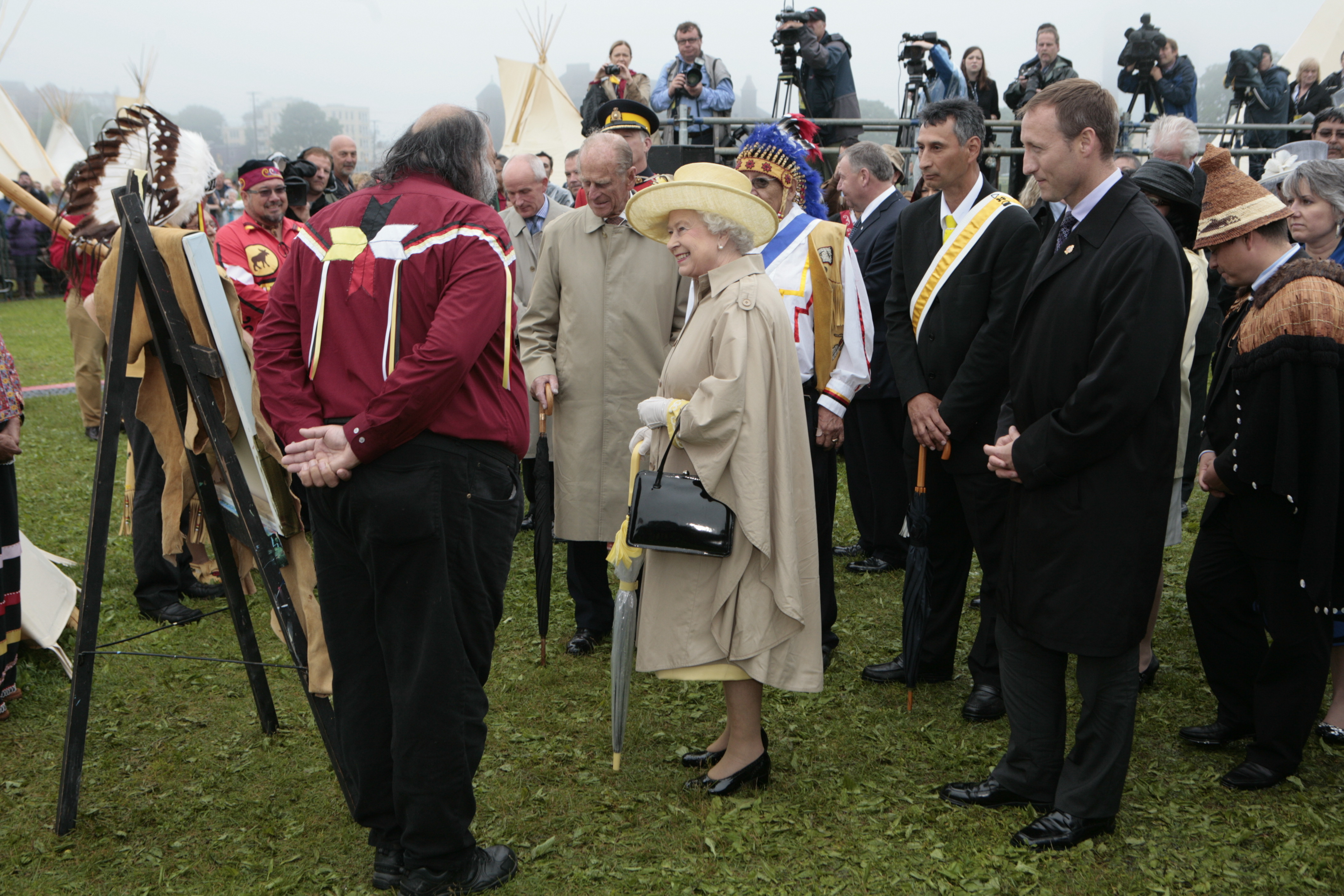
Mi'kmaq leaders present a portrait of Grand Chief Henri Membertou to Queen Elizabeth II in Halifax, Nova Scotia, 28 June 2010

Unlike in the United States, Indigenous peoples in Canada are not considered to be sovereign; rulings by the Supreme Court of Canada reinforced the notion that the Crown holds sovereignty throughout the country. A still burgeoning jurisprudence developed by the court, however, is the monarch's duty to consult with and accommodate First Nations, Inuit, and Métis, where their rights and interests may be at stake. This derives "from the Crown's assertion of sovereignty in the face of prior Aboriginal occupation", with the honour of the Crown at stake.

It has been argued that, by international law, the concept of domestic sovereignty should apply to Indigenous nations within Canada. Contrary to the Supreme Court's rulings, some aboriginal groups have taken to using names that suggest sovereignty on the part of their members, such as the Federation of Sovereign Indigenous Nations in Saskatchewan, which changed its name from the Federation of Saskatchewan Indian Nations in 2016, while others, like the Chiefs of Ontario and the Union of British Columbia Indian Chiefs, claim First Nations are sovereign.

Canada in 2016 endorsed the United Nations Declaration on the Rights of Indigenous Peoples.

== Arctic border ==
Under international law, no country currently owns the North Pole or the region of the Arctic Ocean surrounding it. The five Arctic states—Canada, Denmark (via Greenland), Norway, Russia, and the United States (via Alaska)—are limited to a 200-nautical-mile (370 km; 230 mi) economic zone around their coasts.

Upon ratification of the United Nations Convention on the Law of the Sea, a country has a 10-year period to make claims to extend its 200-nautical-mile zone. Due to this, Norway (ratified the convention in 1996), Russia (ratified in 1997), Canada (ratified in 2003) and Denmark (ratified in 2004) launched projects to base claims that certain Arctic sectors should belong to their territories. The United States has signed, but not yet ratified this treaty.

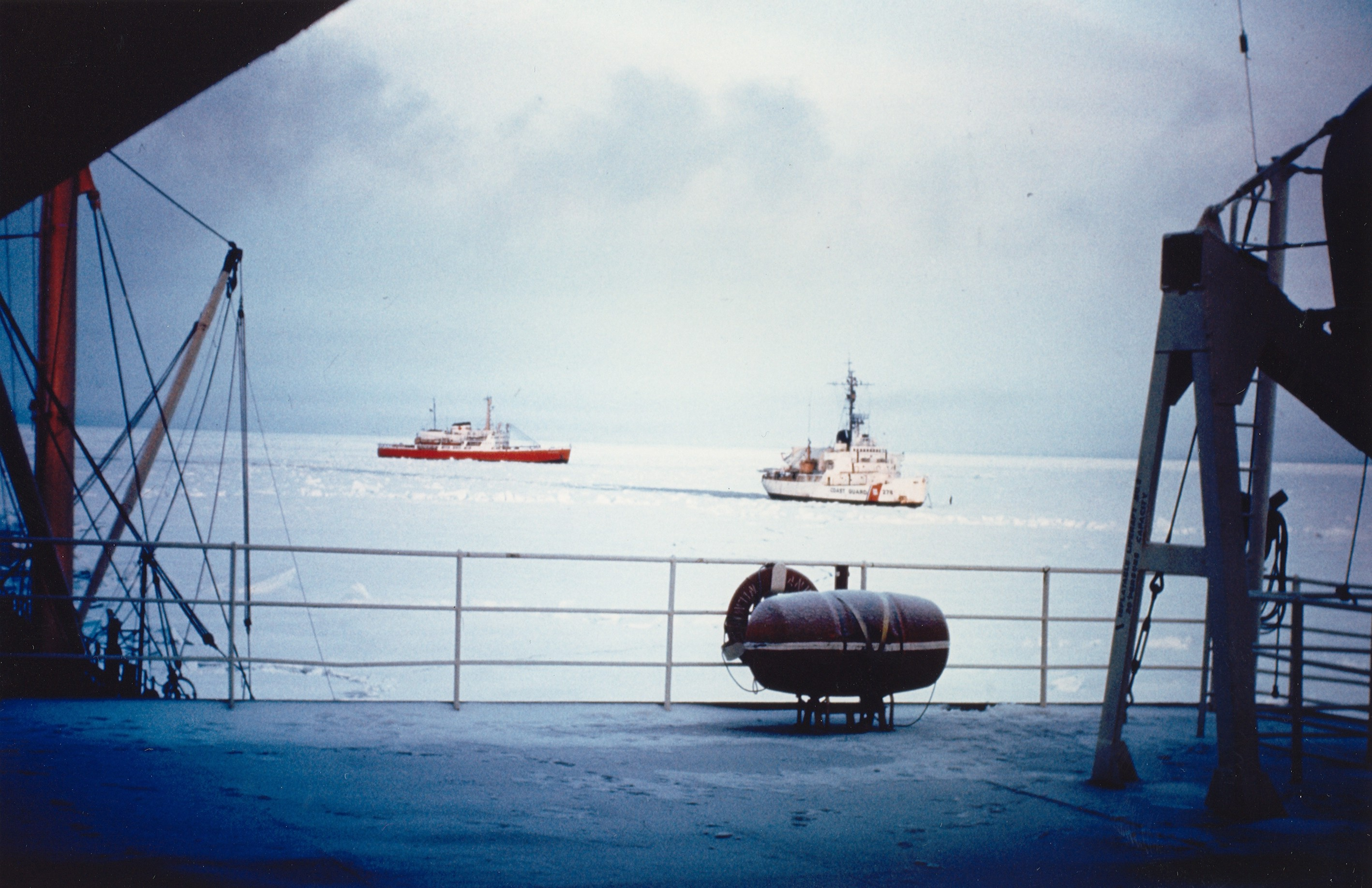
Canadian Coast Guard Ship John A. Macdonald escorts the SS Manhattan through the Northwest Passage, 1969

The status of the Arctic sea region is in dispute. While Canada (since 1925), Denmark, Russia, and Norway all regard parts of the Arctic seas as "national waters" or "internal waters", the United States and most European Union countries officially regard the whole region, including the Northwest Passage, as international waters. The Canadian government considers the Northwest Passage to be Canadian Internal Waters.

Canada has orchestrated certain events to assert its sovereignty in the Arctic area, such as when, in 1970, the federal Cabinet advised the Queen of Canada, Elizabeth II, along with her husband, Prince Philip, Duke of Edinburgh, and two of her children, Prince Charles (now King Charles III) and Princess Anne, to tour Inuvik and Tuktoyaktuk, in the Northwest Territories, the latter being on the coast of the Northwest Passage. To emphasise the point, Charles returned the following year to scuba dive under the Arctic ice. In 1969, the SS Manhattan, an American oil tanker, became the first commercial vessel to transit the passage, prompting much debate about Canada's claims to that body of water. In August 2007, Canada's claims in the Arctic were challenged after a Russian underwater expedition to the North Pole.

== Telecommunications ==
Logos of the Canadian Broadcasting Corporation from 1940 to present

Telecommunications play an essential role in the maintenance of Canada's identity and sovereignty. The Parliament of Canada created the Canada's Telecommunications Act to govern the use of telecommunications. Some of its objectives are "to facilitate the orderly development throughout Canada of a telecommunications system that serves to safeguard, enrich, and strengthen the social and economic fabric of Canada and its regions [...] Promote the use of Canadian transmission facilities for telecommunications within Canada and between Canada and points outside Canada [...] To respond to the economic and social requirements of users of telecommunications services [...] And to contribute to the protection of the privacy of persons."

Furthermore, the Telecommunications Act references the Broadcasting Act, which prescribes that broadcasting has an important role in Canadian sovereignty. The Canadian broadcasting system is legislated to be owned and controlled by Canadians. In this case, the Canadian Broadcasting Corporation, inaugurated 2 November 1936, has had the role of representing Canadians. CBC was established by the Broadcasting Act, which received royal assent on 23 June 1936, following "a royal commission that was concerned about the growing American influence in radio." Radios, television, and the CBC have significantly helped reunite Canadians and build its sovereignty.

== Provincial sovereignty ==
=== Alberta Sovereignty Within a United Canada Act ===
The Legislature of Alberta enacted, on 15 December 2022, the Alberta Sovereignty Within a United Canada Act, with the Executive Council claims to give "Alberta a democratic legislative framework for defending the federal-provincial division of powers while respecting Canada's constitution and the courts" and will be used only when the legislature passes a motion identifying a "specific federal program or piece of legislation as unconstitutional or causing harm to Albertans." The cabinet admits it will abide by court decisions if the aforementioned response is successfully challenged.

The Centre Block of the Parliament of Canada in Ottawa

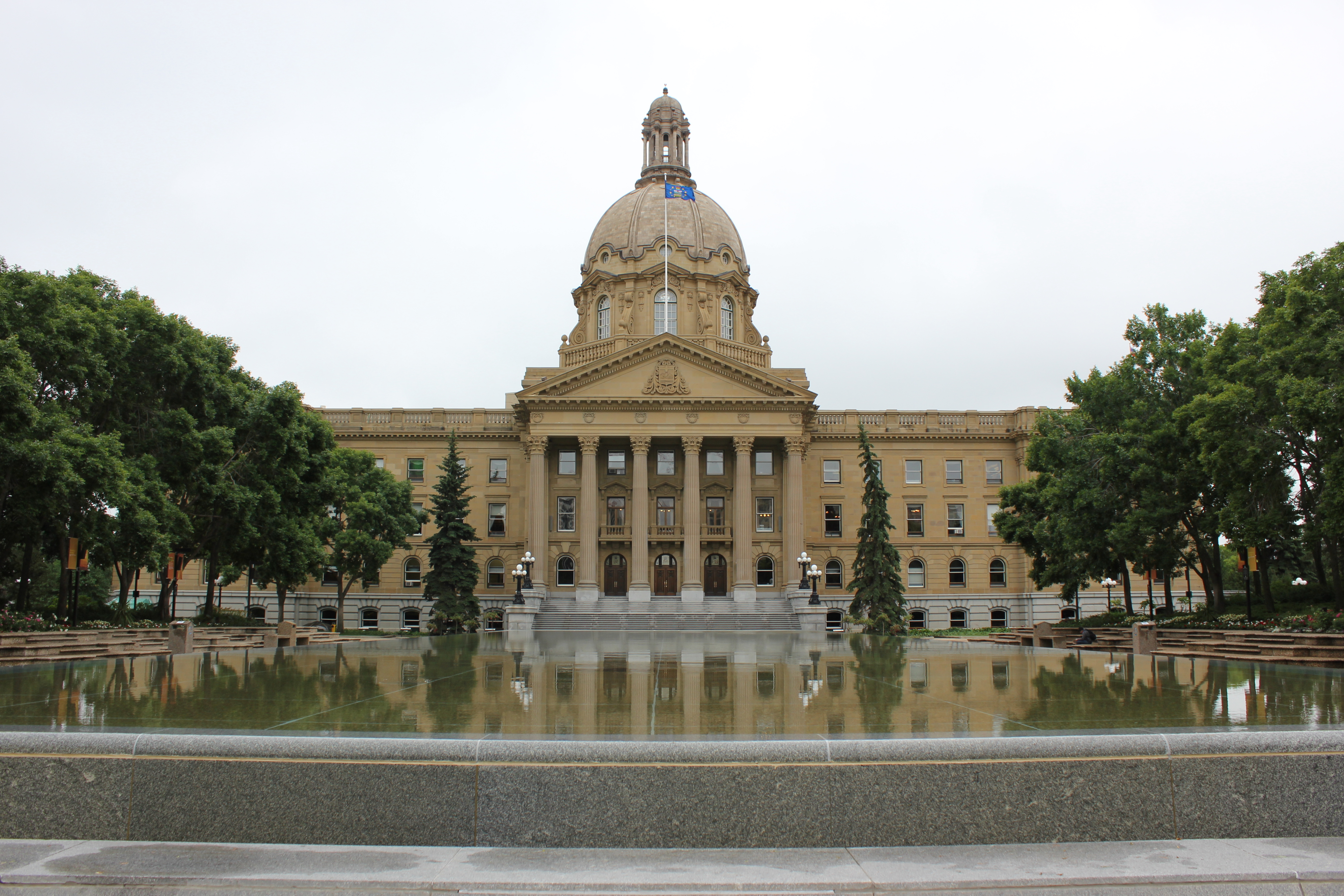
The Alberta Legislature Building in Edmonton

The act was conceived of as a means by which the province would "no longer recognize [the federal Cabinet's and parliament's] claimed authority over provincial areas of constitutional sovereignty." It was based on the Free Alberta Strategy, co-authored by Rob Anderson, Barry Cooper, and Derek From. Cooper was also a co-author of the 2001 Alberta Agenda, which Premier of Alberta Danielle Smith—then a columnist and a 770 CHQR radio host—referred to in her 17 October 2019 Calgary Herald opinion piece as enabling Alberta to become, like Quebec, a "nation within a nation", a view she repeated through her campaign to win the leadership of the United Conservative Party in 2022. During the bill's third reading in the legislature, Smith explained, "it's not like Ottawa is a national government. The way our country works is that we are a federation of sovereign, independent jurisdictions. They are one of those signatories to the constitution and the rest of us, as signatories to the constitution, have a right to exercise our sovereign powers in our own areas of jurisdiction."

Various Alberta politicians opposed the act, as did the chiefs representing Treaties 6, 7, and 8, pointing out that the Executive Council had not consulted with indigenous communities. Among potential constitutional challenges envisioned by law professors Martin Olszynski and Nigel Bankes is the "impermissible delegation of legislative authority"—the so-called "Henry VIII clause", which gives the provincial Crown-in-Council the power to amend laws without debate in the legislature—and added that the bill was both "significant" and "unprecedented" in the way it intrudes into the jurisdiction of Canada's superior courts.

=== Quebec sovereignty movement ===
The Quebec sovereignty movement is a political movement aimed at attaining independent statehood for the province of Quebec, with future possibilities of various collaborations with Canada, including sovereignty-association. In practice, separatism, independence, and sovereignty are all used to describe the goal. However, the latter is the term most commonly employed.

The coat of arms of Quebec

The most apparent reason for separatism is Quebec having a Francophone or predominantly (80%) French-speaking (French-Canadian or Québécois) majority, as compared to the rest of Canada, which consists of eight overwhelmingly (greater than 90%) English-speaking provinces and New Brunswick, which is officially bilingual and about one-third French-speaking. The origins and evolution of the movement are actually fairly complex, however, and extend beyond simply language issues. Some scholars may point to historical events as framing the cause for ongoing support for sovereignty in Quebec, while more contemporary pundits and political actors may point to the aftermath of more recent developments like the Meech Lake Accord or the Charlottetown Accord.

The movement itself began in the Quiet Revolution. René Lévesque introduced the concept of sovereignty-association in his manifesto, Option Québec (An Option for Quebec), published in 1967, proposing an association between the governments of Quebec and Canada, evolving from an agreement under international law. Lévesque saw this as the ultimate goal of Quebec separatism. In October 1978, by which time Lévesque was Premier of Quebec, he spelled out the requirements for sovereignty-association in his White Paper on Sovereignty-Association, calling for a common monetary system and a free trade zone, permitting the free passage of goods and people between Quebec and Canada. Any disputes would be settled by a "community council", composed of an equal number of ministers from each side and presided over, alternately, by a Canadian and a Quebecer. This would give Quebec the economic advantages of the federal union and the benefits of political independence.

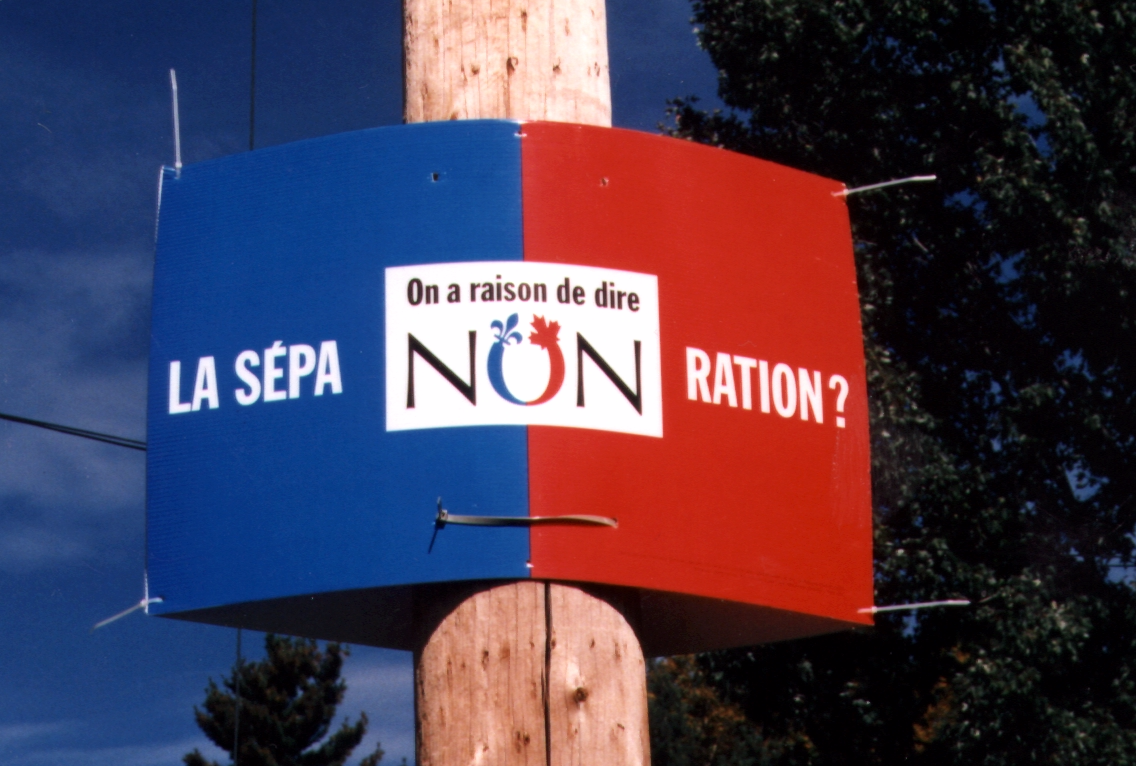
A campaign sign from the 1995 Quebec referendum: "Separation? We are right to say 'No'."

The term sovereignty-association fell out of use after the referendum on Quebec's sovereignty in 1980, replaced by the simpler term sovereignty. Whereas the question in that referendum proposed to negotiate sovereignty-association with the Canadian Crown, the referendum in 1995 (which was defeated by a margin of 50.58 per cent "no" to 49.42 per cent "yes") proposed "sovereignty", along with an optional partnership offer to the rest of Canada, asking the question, "do you agree that Québec should become sovereign after having made a formal offer to Canada for a new economic and political partnership within the scope of the bill respecting the future of Québec and of the agreement signed on June 12, 1995?" This proposed an economic and political “partnership” with Canada; sovereignty-partnership was defined more as a form of political independence. Sovereignty-association, in contrast, meant a new agreement on Confederation.

=== The Saskatchewan First Act ===
The Executive Council of Saskatchewan tabled the Saskatchewan First Bill in the provincial parliament on 1 November 2022, intending it to "confirm Saskatchewan's sovereign autonomy." The Attorney General and Minister of Justice, Bronwyn Eyre claimed the law would "help protect our economic growth and prosperity from intrusive federal policies that encroach upon our legislative sovereignty." The bill passed into the Saskatchewan First Act on 16 March 2023.

The Federation of Sovereign Indigenous Nations opposed the bill, stating the Executive Council failed in its duty to consult. The Métis Nation—Saskatchewan unanimously rejected the Saskatchewan First Act, stating it "does nothing to advance or recognize Métis rights."

== Threats to Canadian sovereignty ==
Starting in December 2024, then President-elect Donald Trump and his supporters began expressing support for Canadian annexation into the United States of America as its 51st state. This came after months of tariff threats on Canadian goods and renewed demands by Trump for Canada to increase its military spending and prioritize border security. Political leaders and public opinion in Canada overwhelmingly opposed this idea. Trump has continued to make proposals to annex Canada following his inauguration as President of the United States.

A 2025 report sponsored by the Canadian government identified several potential threats to Canadian sovereignty. Economic dependence on foreign markets, particularly the United States, has raised concerns about Canada's ability to independently shape its trade and economic policies. Cybersecurity threats, including attacks on critical infrastructure and government institutions, pose risks to national security, with state and non-state actors, particularly China and Russia, being identified as sources of cyber espionage and interference. Intelligence agencies have warned of efforts by China to cultivate political connections and by Russia to spread disinformation. Canada's sovereignty in the Arctic is increasingly contested, as climate change opens new navigation routes and facilitates greater international interest in resource extraction, with Russia expanding its military presence.

== See also ==
- Canadian identity
- Canadian nationalism
- Hans Island
