= Arlot =

Arlot may refer to:

- 17893 Arlot, a minor planet named after French astronomer Jean-Eudes Arlot
- Variant name of Herleva, mother of William the Conqueror
