= Abbot Scotland v Hamo the Sherrif =

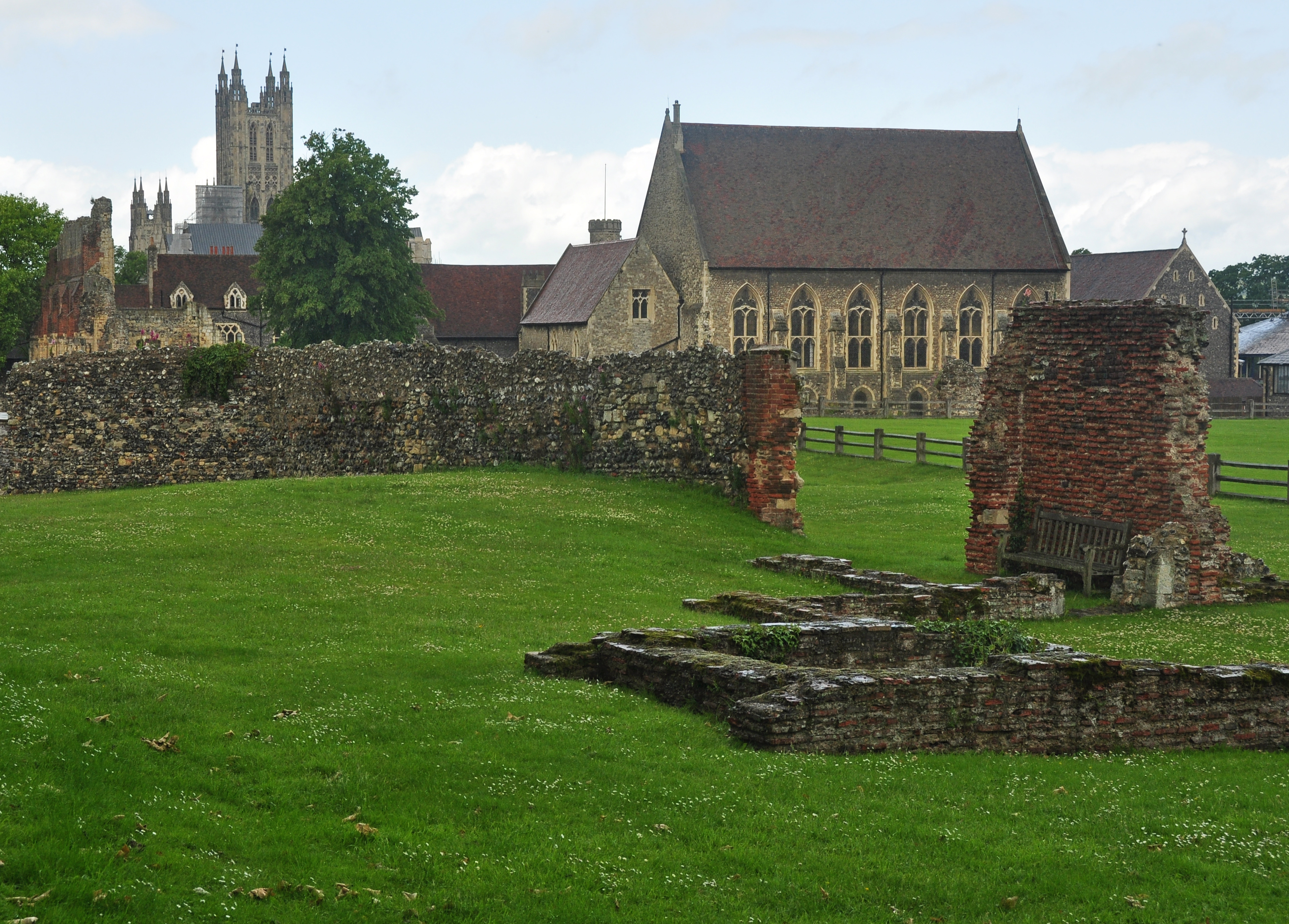
- Fordwich borough and other lands had been given by the ousted abbot of St Augustine's Abbey (now partly ruined) to the sheriff. The new abbot successfully sued for them back.
- Court: The King as final arbiter
- Decided: 1076

Case history
- Prior actions: An initial decision, unreported
- Subsequent action: none

Court membership
- Judge sitting: William the Conqueror

Keywords
- Alienation of church property/voidable acts by an outlaw - medieval ecclesiastical patronage - established religion

'Abbot Scotland v Hamo the Sherrif' or more precisely versus Hamo the Steward, Sheriff of Kent as agent for (or chief tenant of) Bishop Odo of Bayeux, the Earl of Kent (1076) was a determination by William the Conqueror of an English land law suit.

The matter involved a civil plea (suit) against the donation by a previous abbot of some lands of St Augustine's Abbey, Canterbury and their continued confiscation by William himself. In this case the direct defendant was the land holder (chief tenant) Hamo the Steward, Sheriff of Kent who had been a judge in the case Odo of Bayeux v Lanfranc (1071) five years prior. (Note: Hamo became a chief tenant or overlord under the Crown of lands in Kent, Essex and Surrey, per the contemporary work, the Domesday Book)

The sheriff acted as the king's agent, with his licence, for Odo, the king's brother.

== Background ==
The abbey, founded in 598, was given various incremental endowments. King Edward the Confessor in 1055 gave two of the three parts of Fordwich Borough to the Abbey, the third part was confiscated by the sheriff but given to the Abbey (whether before or as a result of this action) having belonged to Earl Godwin of Wessex (who was Edward's wife's father).

The last abbott (Egelsin), very much a Saxon, fled from office in 1070 in some way seen to have joined, or having joined, Archbishop Stigand's resistance to William. Before doing so to gain the favour of the powerful Normans, he granted one, Hamo (also recorded as Hamo de Crevequer, surnamed Vicecomes), several estates, among which Fordwich borough. The King endorsed the confiscation of the land on his flight and replaced him with the Norman or pro-Norman, Scotland. Scotland proved an astute abbot.

== Outcome ==
Abbot Scotland recovered for the abbey Plumstead and Fordwich, besides soon or simultaneously obtaining regal grants of the churches of Faversham, Milton and Newington, and various liberties, the King ruling in his favour. He also began the complete rebuilding of the abbey, which was carried on by his successors.

== Wider implications ==
The case formed part of a raft of 11th century pleadings against the Normans, whose majority takeover of power, assets and money is recorded by the Domesday Book's 10-year-period account of land ownership. This consolidation saw 64% of land in England pass into the hands of 150 individuals; disgruntled claimants included monastic houses whose abbots had proven unsupportive and surviving Anglo-Saxon nobility. Scotland later died in office in 1087.

== See also ==
- Odo of Bayeux v Lanfranc (1071)
- Bishop Odo v Walter, Abbot of Evesham (1077)
- Bishop Wulstan v Abbot Walter 1077.
