= Arlott =

Arlott may refer to:

- John Arlott, English cricket commentator.
- Emily Arlott, English cricketer.
- Variant name of Herleva, mother of William the Conqueror.
