= Fulbert =

Fulbert is a given name. Notable people with the name include:

- Fulbert of Cambrai, Bishop of Cambrai (died 956)
- Fulbert of Chartres, Bishop of Chartres (1006–1028)
- Fulbert of Falaise (fl. 11th century), maternal grandfather of William the Conqueror
- Abbé Fulbert Youlou (1917-1972), a Brazzaville-Congolese Roman Catholic priest, nationalist leader
