= R v Waterfield =

R v. Waterfield
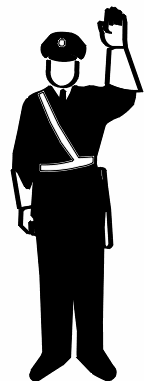
- Court: Court of Appeal
- Full case name: The Crown v Eli Waterfield
- Decided: 17 October 1963
- Citation: [1964] 1 Q.B. 164; [1963] 3 W.L.R. 946; [1963] 3 All E.R. 659; (1964) 48 Cr. App. R. 42; (1964) 128 J.P. 48; (1963) 107 S.J. 833
- Cases cited: None
- Legislation cited: Metropolitan Police Act 1839 s. 66; Offences against the Person Act 1861 s. 38; Road Traffic Act 1960 s. 2; Road Traffic Act 1960 s. 223

Case history
- Prior action: None
- Subsequent action: None

Court membership
- Judges sitting: Lord Parker C.J., Ashworth J. and Hinchcliffe J.

Keywords
- Assault; Vehicle; Police officers; Police powers; Search and seizure; Action without warrant for minor suspected offences; Investigation of misdemeanours

R v Waterfield [1963] 3 All E.R. 659 is an English Court of Appeal decision, a court of binding precedent, outlining the modern limits of the law that authorises a police officer to stop (and then conceivably detain) a person.

This case produced what is known as the Waterfield test (incorporating the common law "ancillary power doctrine") for the limit of police authority to interfere with a person's liberty or property.

== Facts ==
The police were investigating a reported incident of dangerous driving, where a car had rammed into a wall. It turned out that the car was owned by Eli Waterfield and driven by his friend, Geoffrey Lynn, but police were unable to make any arrests without further evidence.

One evening, while Lynn sat in the car at the local market, two police officers approached him to ask to search it. Lynn said he would leave. One of the officers said he would stop him if he tried. Waterfield arrived, told the police that they had no right to seize his car and told Lynn to drive away. The officers blocked the way, but Waterfield told Lynn to drive through the officers. Lynn drove forward, forcing the officer to jump out of the way.

Waterfield and Lynn were charged for assaulting a constable who was in the execution of his duty contrary to the Offences against the Person Act 1861.

== Opinion of court ==
Ashworth J., for the court, held that the charge of assault was invalid and quashed the convictions. To come to this conclusion, the court made a key analysis of the requirements needed to show that a police officer was in the execution of his duties.

In most cases it is probably more convenient to consider what the police constable was actually doing and in particular whether such conduct was prima facie (on the face of it) an unlawful interference with a person's liberty or property. If so, it is then relevant to consider whether

- (a) such conduct falls within the general scope of any duty imposed by statute or recognized at common law (Note: Principally stopping a person so as to carry out reasonable identification and considering detention of those involved in the act or getaway, otherwise called being in flagrante delicto, or on scene of the crime and some form evidence such as behavioural to implicate that person, or with a reasonable suspicion a serious offence has been carried out and an intention to arrest that person on no more than identificatory evidence by stopping that person briefly) and
- (b) whether such conduct, albeit within the general scope of such a duty, involved an unjustifiable use of powers associated with the duty.

Thus, while it is no doubt right to say in general terms that police constables have a duty to prevent crime and a duty, when crime is committed, to bring the offender to justice, it is also clear from the decided cases that when the execution of these general duties involves interference with the person or property of a private person, the powers of constables are not unlimited.

== Footnotes and citations ==
Notes

== See also ==
- English criminal law
- Criminal law
- List of Supreme Court of Judicature cases
