= Herluin de Conteville =

Stepfather of William the Conqueror

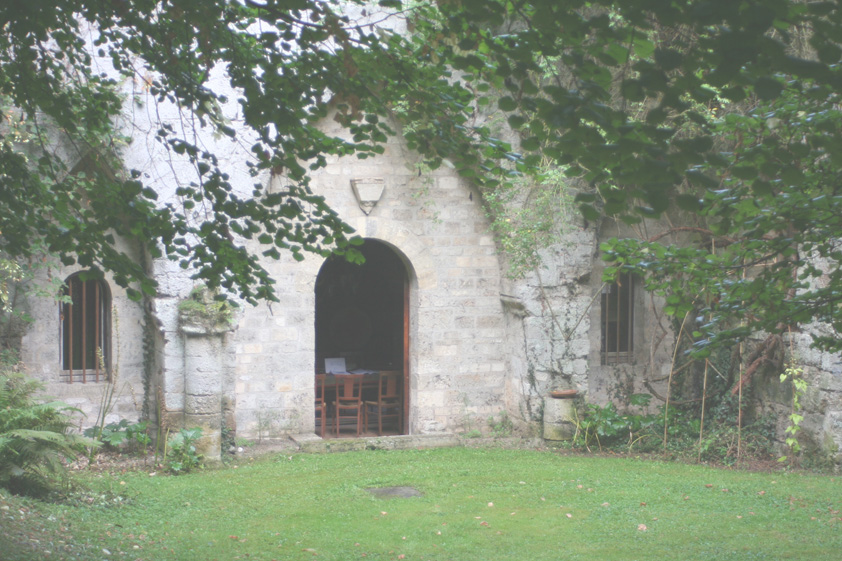
- Grestain Abbey in Normandy, the burial place of Herluin de Conteville.
- Spouse(s): Herleva, Fredesendis
- Children: Odo of Bayeux, Robert, Count of Mortain

Herluin de Conteville (c. 1001–1066) was the stepfather of William the Conqueror and the father of Odo of Bayeux and Robert, Count of Mortain, both of whom became prominent during William's reign. He died in 1066, the year his stepson conquered England.

== Conteville and Sainte-Mère-Église ==
Herluin was a lord of moderate income and held some land on the south side of the river Seine. He was viscount of Conteville, probably so created by his stepson, and held the honour of Sainte-Mère-Église, a portion of the county of Mortain. There he founded Grestain Abbey around 1050 with his son Robert.

== Uncertain parentage ==
No contemporary record provides the parentage for Herluin, although later sources, notably the Book of de Burgos, have assigned him parents, such as the otherwise unknown couple of Jean de Conteville and Harlette de Meulan.

== Herluin's marriage to Herleva ==
In the mid-11th century, Conteville and its dependencies appear to have been in the hands of Herluin, whose wife Herleva was previously the mistress of Robert I, Duke of Normandy and mother of his only son, William, (later called William the Conqueror). Herluin and Herleva had two sons, Odo or Eudes, who became Bishop of Bayeux, and Robert, Count of Mortain. Both were prominent in the reign of their half-brother William. They also had several daughters, including Emma, who married Richard le Goz, Viscount of Avranches, and one of unknown name, sometimes called Muriel in modern genealogies, who married Guillaume, Seigneur de la Ferté-Macé. Herluin is said to have loyally borne William's body to his grave at Caen after he died in the burning of Mantes; however, that was in 1087, well after Herluin's death in 1066.

== Family ==
Herluin of Conteville was married to Herleve of Falaise and together they had six known children:

- Emma de Conteville Born: abt 1029 Married Viscount Richard le Goz
- Robert de Conteville Born: abt 1031 Married Matilda de Montgomery
- Mathilde de Conteville Born: abt 1033 Married Ingleran I de Preaux
- Eudes Odo de Conteville Born: abt 1035
- Herleva de Conteville Born: abt 1037 Married Seigneur Ranulphus de Briwere
- Muriel de Conteville Born: abt 1039 Married Guillaume de la Ferte-Mace

== Herluin's marriage to Fredesendis ==
After Herleva's death, Herluin remarried to Fredesendis, who appears as a benefactor of Grestain Abbey, and as Herluin's wife in the confirmation charter of the abbey, dated 1189. The abbey was founded by Herluin himself around 1050, in hopes of achieving a cure to his leprosy or some similar disease. Little is known of the children of Herluin and Fredesendis. A son Jean de Conteville appears to have died young. A Ralph de Conteville appearing in the Domesday Book holding land in Somerset and Devon, has been identified as another son, though others derive that man from the Pas-de-Calais, and hence not of this family.
