= King's Bench =

The King's Bench (French: Cour du banc du Roi (Note: For use in Canada, in accordance with the country's policy of official bilingualism.)), or, during the reign of a female monarch, the Queen's Bench (Cour du banc de la Reine), refers to several contemporary and historical courts in some Commonwealth jurisdictions.

- Court of King's Bench (England), a historic court of common law in the English legal system until 1875
- Court of King's Bench (Ireland), a historic senior court of common law in Ireland
- King's Bench Division, a division of the High Court of England and Wales that assumed many of the responsibilities of the historic King's Bench in 1875
- Court of King's Bench of Alberta, the superior trial court of the Canadian province of Alberta
- Court of King's Bench of Manitoba, the superior trial court of the Canadian province of Manitoba
- Court of King's Bench of New Brunswick, the superior trial court of the Canadian province of New Brunswick
- Court of King's Bench for Saskatchewan, the superior trial court of the Canadian province of Saskatchewan
- Court of King's Bench of Quebec, the prior name for the present-day Quebec Court of Appeal

== See also ==
- Court system of Canada
- List of Supreme Court of Judicature cases
