= Grestain Abbey =

Eleventh century French monastery

Abbaye Notre-Dame de Grestain
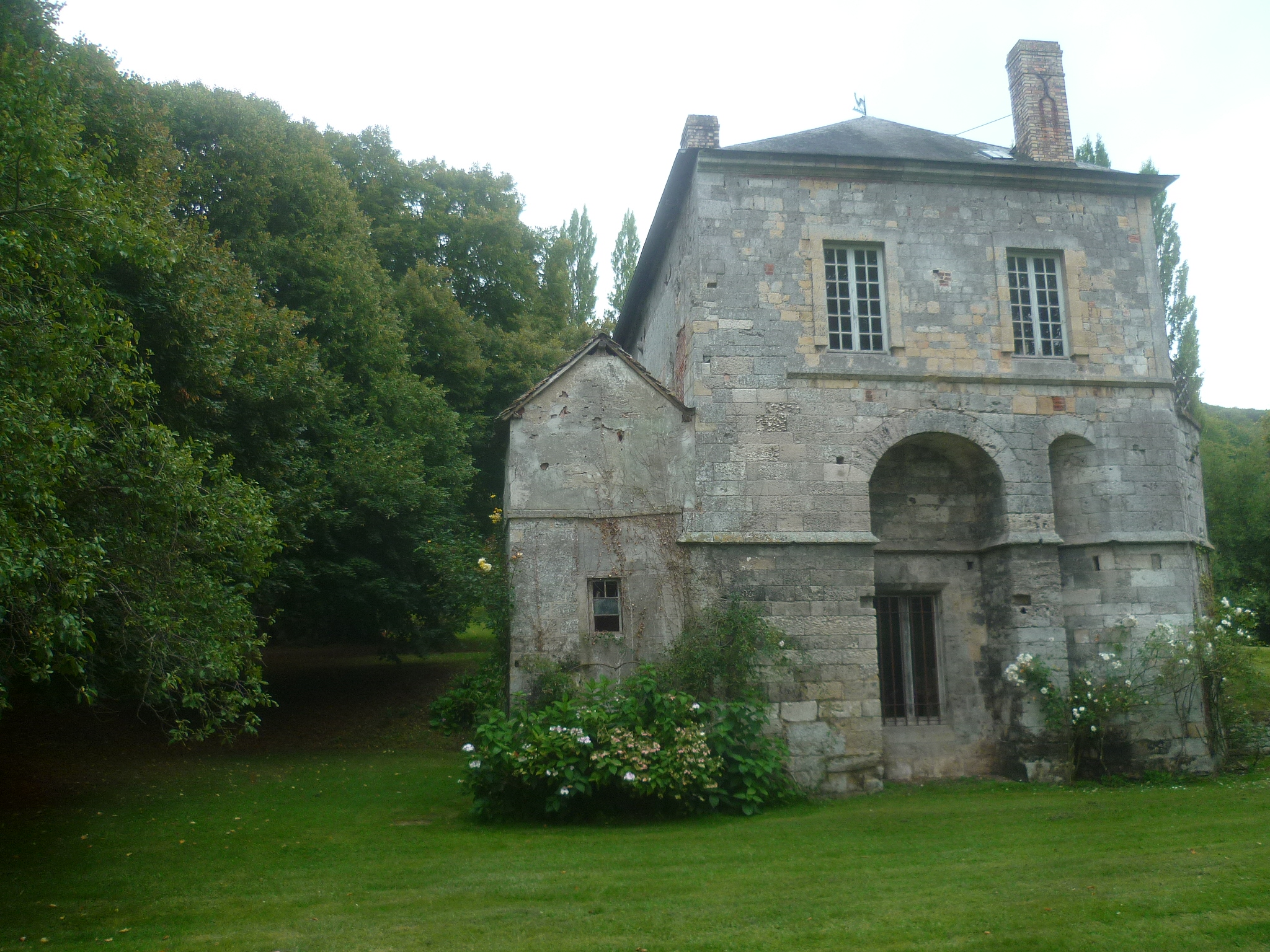

Religion
- Affiliation: Roman Catholic
- Diocese: Eure
- Province: Upper Normandy
- Ecclesiastical or organizational status: demolished
- Year consecrated: 1050

Location
- Location: Fatouville-Grestain
- Interactive map of Abbaye Notre-Dame de Grestain
- Coordinates: 49.426202°N 0.331821°E

Architecture
- Style: Norman

Website
- www.abbaye-de-grestain.fr

Grestain Abbey (or Grestein Abbey, French: Abbaye Notre-Dame de Grestain) was an 11th-Century Benedictine monastery near the town of Fatouville-Grestain, which is located in the modern-day Eure département of Upper Normandy, France. The abbey was in the Catholic Diocese of Lisieux. Closely associated with the family of William, Duke of Normandy, the abbey was instrumental in the Normans taking control over the Church in England in the centuries following the Norman Conquest of England, establishing new churches and priories in England, and Abbots of Grestain ordained many English priests. Many churches mentioned in the Domesday Book of 1086 cite Grestain as the founding establishment.

== History ==
The Abbey was founded in 1050 by Herluin de Conteville and his wife Arlette, mother of William the Conqueror.

Herluin, a victim of leprosy, was said to have seen a vision of the Blessed Virgin Mary who told him to take a spa treatment at the source of the Carbec stream in Grestain (Carbec meaning "the Stream of Kari").

Cured, he decided to build an abbey in the nearby Valley of Vilaine dedicated to the Virgin and a chapel at Carbec, a site also dedicated to the healing spring of Saint-Méen.

Herluin's son, Robert de Mortain, half-brother of William, was the principal benefactor, endowing it with his revenues from England.

In 1358, the abbey was sacked by the Anglo-Navarrais. The monks took refuge at their safe house in Rouen, in the parish of Saint-Eloi. Between 15 November 1364 and 10 August 1365, the abbey was attacked once more. On the return of the monks, the abbey had been partly destroyed and nearly razed to the ground.

The abbey was officially closed in 1757 on the orders of the bishop. The church buildings were demolished around 1766 and the rest of abbey destroyed in 1790; of these buildings, only a few ruins remain, integrated into the Château de La Pommeraye (a private property): a defensive wall, a 13th-Century portal, an 18th-Century manor with a 13th-Century floor, and remains of the church.

A monument has been erected to the memory of the founders who were buried in the now defunct church: Arlette, Herluin and Robert de Mortain, as well as Robert's wife, Mathilde de Montgomerie, daughter of Roger de Montgomerie.

== Arms of the Abbey ==
Azure with three gold fleurs de lys.

== Priories of the Abbey ==
The Abbey had a number of priories:

- Saint-Astier, Dordogne, founded by Geoffroi, 2nd Abbot of Grestain;
- Sainte-Scolasse or Saint-Nicolas-en-Scolasse (Sainte-Scolasse-sur-Sarthe), founded by Herluin de Conteville;
- Saint-Nicol or Saint-Nicolas-du-Val-de-Claire, in the suburbs of Honfleur, founded by William the Conqueror.

== Burials ==
- Herluin de Conteville and his wife Herleva
- Robert, Count of Mortain and his wife Matilda (daughter of Roger de Montgomery, 1st Earl of Shrewsbury)

== Bibliography ==
- Charles Bréard, L'abbaye de Notre-Dame de Grestain, de l'ordre de Saint-Benoît, à l'ancien diocèse de Lisieux, Rouen: A. Lestringant, 1904.
- Honoré Fisquet, La France pontificale (Gallia christiana), histoire chronologique et biographique des archevêques et évêques de tous les diocèses de France depuis l'établissement du christianisme jusqu'à nos jours, divisée en 17 provinces ecclésiastique. Rouen. Paris: E. Repos, 1864-1873.
- Auguste Le Prévost, Carbec-Grestain dans « Mémoires et notes pour servir à l'histoire du département de l'Eure, Volume 1 », Imprimerie d'Auguste Hérissey, Évreux, 1862, Internet Archive.
