= Conteville, Eure =

Conteville
- Commune
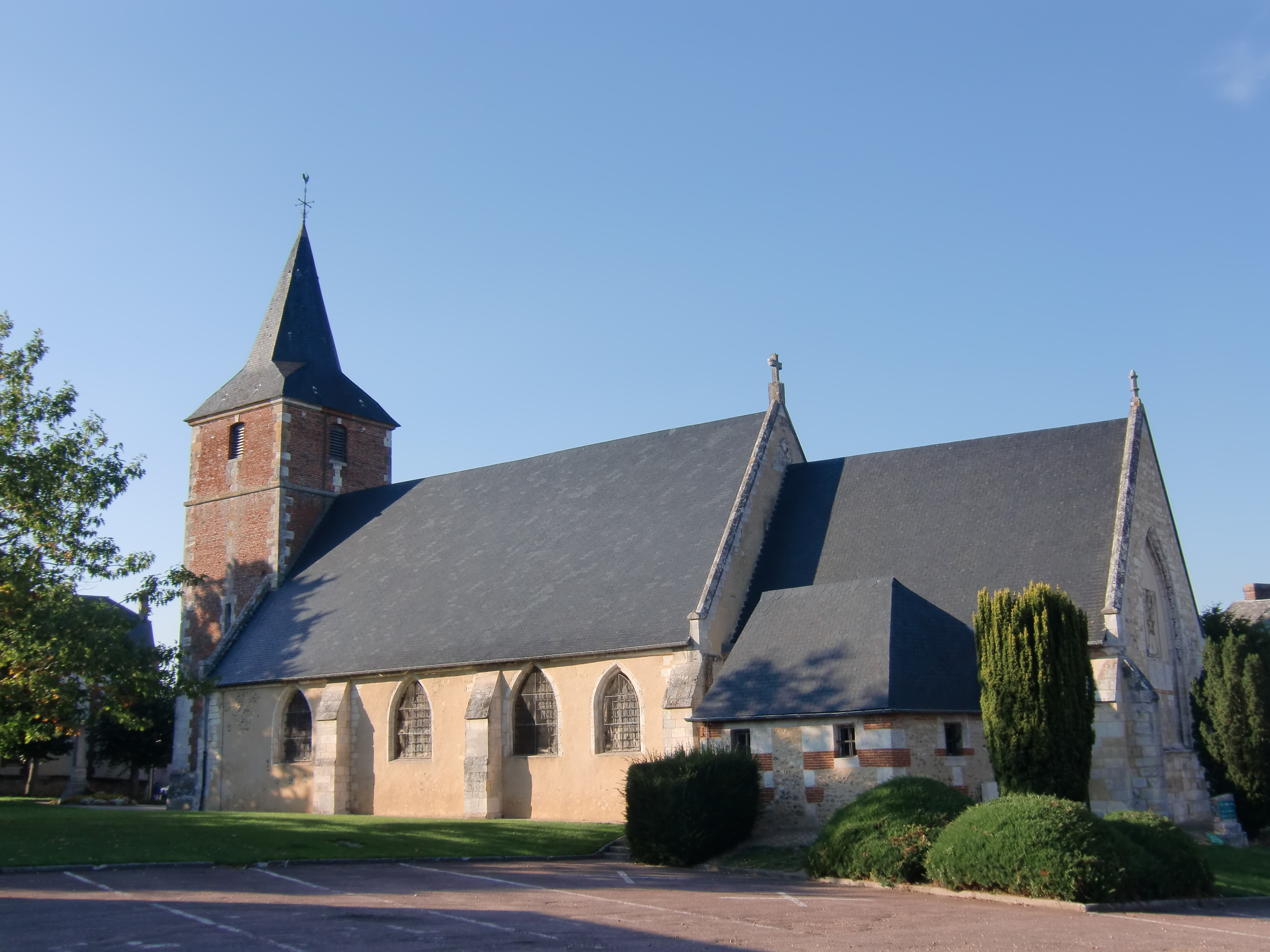
- The church in Conteville
- Location of Conteville
- Location within France Location within Normandy
- Coordinates: 49°25′10″N 0°23′44″E
- Country: France
- Region: Normandy
- Department: Eure
- Arrondissement: Bernay
- Canton: Beuzeville

Government
  - Mayor (2020–2026): Martine Lecerf
- Area^{1}: 10.68 km^{2} (4.12 sq mi)
- Elevation: 33 m (108 ft)
- Highest elevation: 103 m (338 ft)
- Lowest elevation: 0 m (0 ft)
- Population (2023): 1,038
  - Density: 97.19/km^{2} (251.7/sq mi)
- Time zone: UTC+01:00 (CET)
  - Summer (DST): UTC+02:00 (CEST)
- INSEE/Postal code: 27169 /27210
- ^{1} French Land Register data, which excludes lakes, ponds, glaciers > 1 km^{2} (0.386 sq mi or 247 acres) and river estuaries.

Conteville (French pronunciation: [kɔ̃tvil]) is a commune in the northwestern French department of Eure, Normandy.

== Population ==
Historical population
| Year | Pop. | ±% p.a. |
|---|---|---|
| 1968 | 470 | — |
| 1975 | 463 | −0.21% |
| 1982 | 580 | +3.27% |
| 1990 | 701 | +2.40% |
| 1999 | 726 | +0.39% |
| 2007 | 843 | +1.89% |
| 2012 | 942 | +2.25% |
| 2017 | 999 | +1.18% |
| 2023 | 1,038 | +0.64% |
Source: INSEE

== See also ==
- Communes of the Eure department
- Herluin de Conteville, viscount of Conteville, stepfather of William the Conqueror
