= Sarah Baker (18th-century actress) =

English actress and theatre manager

- Born: Sarah Wakelin; 1736 or 1737; Milton, Kent, England
- Died: 20 February 1816; Rochester, Kent
- Occupations: actress; theatre manager
- Spouse: Thomas Baker (m. 1760–1769)

Sarah Baker (1736/1737 – 20 February 1816) was an English actress and theatre manager of the late Georgian era whose career in Kent lasted more than 50 years. Despite her being illiterate and facing fierce opposition from male rivals, her business acumen led her to becoming one of the most successful self-made women of her time.

== Early career ==
Baker was born Sarah Wakelin in about 1736/1737, in Milton, Kent to Ann Wakelin née Clark (d. 1787), an acrobatic dancer and troupe manager. Ann's business, "Mrs. Wakelin's Company", performed at the Sadler's Wells Theatre; Baker's father, James Wakelin (1716–1779), was an actor of minor parts at the Theatre Royal Haymarket who later opened a bookshop in Shoe Lane from where he sold religious books and tracts. With her sister Mary, Baker performed as a dancer in her mother's company at Sadler's Wells and then went on tour to Norwich, Great Yarmouth and Bristol. Baker also performed as a puppeteer, and her mother's company was regularly fined at Stourbridge Fair at Cambridge between 1762 and 1777 for offering performances which included rope-dancing and slack wire acts, puppet shows and pantomime.

== Marriage ==
She married Thomas Baker (1735–1769) on 6 January 1760 in Finsbury, London. He was an acrobat in the Wakelin troupe who may have been the well-known clown-tumbler Polander; he died in 1769 leaving Baker with three young children to raise: Anne Baker (1761–1817); Henry Baker (1765–), and Sally "Sarah" Baker (1769–1817). To support her young family, from 1772 to 1777 Baker managed her mother's Sadler's Wells company featuring "rope-dancing, tumbling, musical interludes, burlettas, and all the clothes, scenery and machinery 'entirely new'". As she had been steeped in performing all her life Baker totally immersed herself in her new role, undertaking most tasks herself:

"When Mrs. Baker (who had many years previously only employed actors and actresses of cherry-wood, holly, oak, or ebony, and dressed and undressed both the ladies and gentlemen herself), first engaged a living company, she not only used to beat the drum behind the scenes, in Richard, and other martial plays, but was occasionally her own prompter."

Baker's company toured all over Kent, including: Dover, Canterbury, Rochester, Faversham and Tunbridge Wells in addition to occasional visits to Folkestone, Deal, Sandwich, Lewes and Sittingbourne. Her acting company included various family members such as her mother, Mrs. Ann Wakelin; her sister Mary, her three children and her cousins, the Irelands, various of whom were also musicians with the company. To vary the bill Baker also hired successful and popular entertainers including the clown Lewy Owen. A playbill from the 1770s for the Bartholomew Fair states that Mrs. Baker's Company will appear at the Greyhound Yard Theatre where they will perform Charles Dibdin's 1774 ballad opera The Waterman, with Lewy Owen as Robin and Miss Wakelin as Wilhelmina. The afterpiece was Harlequin's Whim, or, The Merry Medly in which Miss Sarah Baker appeared as Columbine. On returning to the Greyhound in 1780 Mrs. Baker's company presented The Quaker followed by the pantomime Harlequin Wanderer; or, the Great Turk Outwitted with Miss Wakelin as Columbine, Lewy Owen as Clown and Miss Sarah Baker as a maid.

== Theatre manager ==
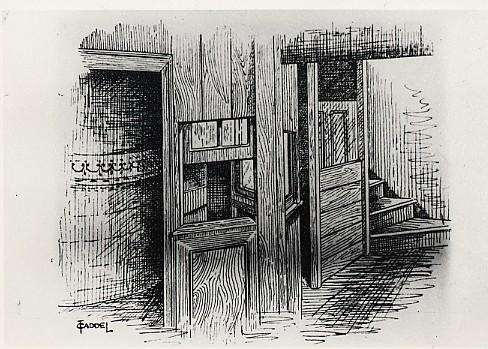
Sarah Baker's paybox in the Theatre Royal, Rochester (1884)

When her mother retired in 1777, Baker created a new touring company with which she performed plays including those of William Shakespeare and Richard Brinsley Sheridan, in addition to continuing to offer traditional fairground and variety entertainment. The actor William Dowton joined her company in 1791 and married her daughter, Sarah, in 1794. Other performers who appeared with Baker in their early careers include Edmund Kean and Thomas Dibdin who were attracted by the offer of regular salaries. As her company became more established Baker was able to attract more famous performers, including Charles Incledon, George Frederick Cooke, Dorothea Jordan and Joseph Grimaldi, the latter of whom appeared with her in Rochester in 1801. In March the following year, Grimaldi worked with Baker in Kent where he performed in a pantomime, which earned him £300 for two days work. Her company's repertoire included several Shakespeare plays: Hamlet, Macbeth, Richard III, As You Like It and The Merchant of Venice were performed at least weekly during the 1780s while comic operas and Dibdin's locally themed The Merry Hop-Pickers, or, Kentish Frolicks were regularly on the bill.

Initially she used a portable theatre that could be set up and taken down and transported to the next town or alternatively any suitable building would be used for performances; but in about 1789 she began to build her own permanent theatres – eventually owning ten including at Hastings, Tunbridge Wells, Maidstone, Canterbury, Folkestone and Rochester. Each had a residence attached where her performers were guaranteed good, cheap accommodation.

So that a careful eye could be kept on the takings Baker had each of her theatres designed so that one box office covered all entrances. In 1815 she passed the management of her successful company to her son-in-law William Dowton.

== Death and legacy ==
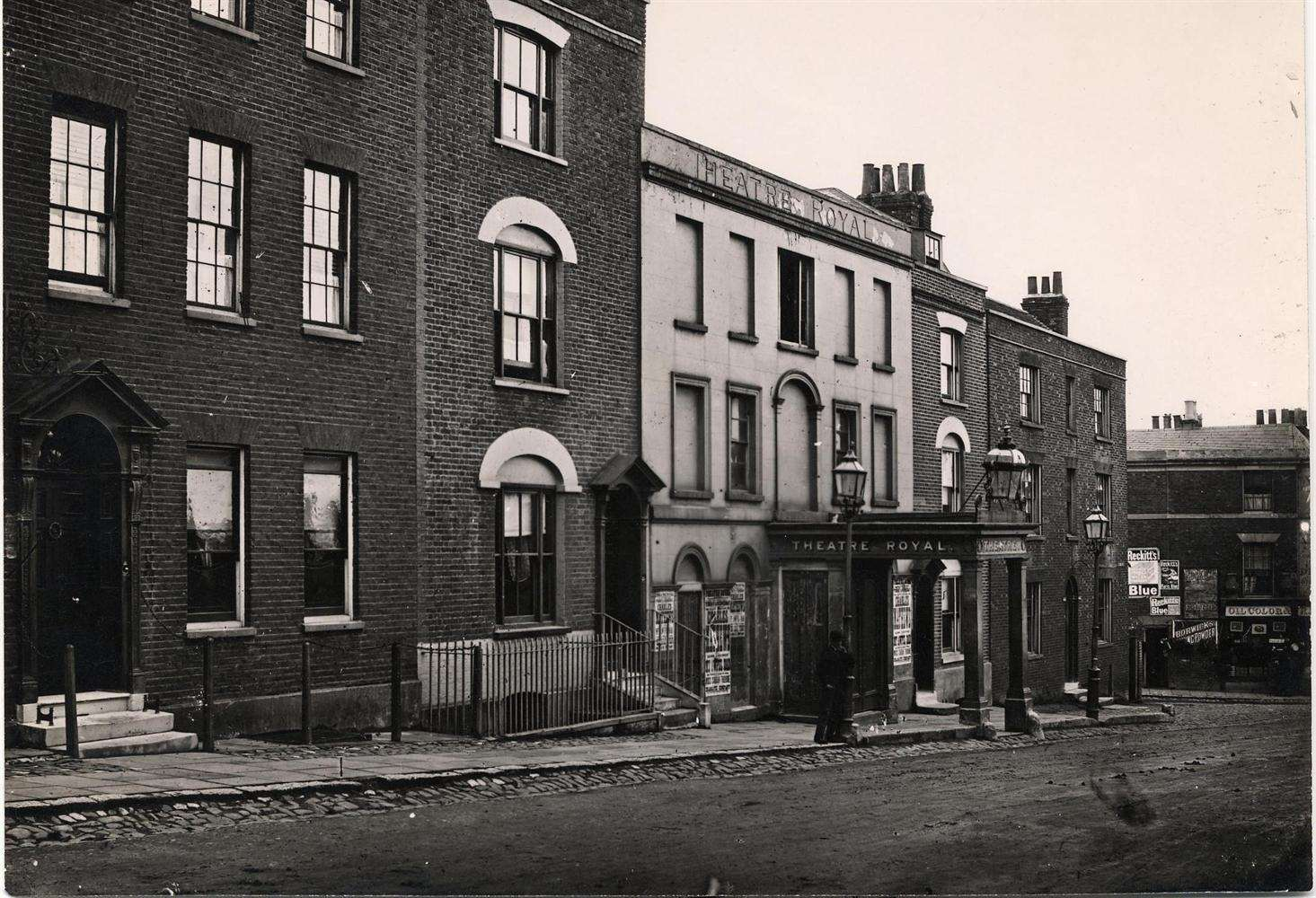
The Theatre Royal in Rochester built for Sarah Baker who died in the building beside it in 1816

The young Charles Dickens lived in Rochester during his formative years and visited the Theatre Royal as a boy and later wrote about it in his The Uncommercial Traveller and The Mystery of Edwin Drood. Today a plaque commemorating Dickens is placed on the building that stands on its site. Some claim that his interest in acting and writing was inspired by Baker and the Theatre Royal and he may have based one of his characters on her.

Baker died in her home in Rochester beside the Theatre Royal she had built in February 1816 and was buried in the churchyard at Rochester Cathedral. In her will she left about £16,000 in investments and property.

The epitaph on her gravestone by Thomas Dibdin reads:

If industry have claim to moral worth;

… then she, whose frame

Decays beneath, with humble hope may aim

At happiness to come. Alone, untaught,

And self-assisted, (save by Heaven) she sought

To render each his own, and fairly save

What might help others when she found a grave.
