= R v Grillo =

Court trial in England

Case history
- Subsequent action: none

R v Grillo and Grillo was the trial of two sisters at Isleworth Crown Court in London, England.

The defendants, Grillo, former personal assistants to Nigella Lawson and her ex-husband Charles Saatchi, were accused of allegedly using their credit cards, specifically without special authorisation, on the account of Saatchi's private company between January 2008 and December 2012.

In 2013, the sisters pleaded not guilty to the charges. The jury found them not guilty.

== Background ==
Charles Saatchi and Nigella Lawson married in 2003. Lawson was married to the journalist John Diamond until his death in 2001; Lawson and Diamond had two children together. In June 2013, photographs emerged of Saatchi grasping Lawson around the throat at a dinner table outside a Mayfair restaurant. Saatchi accepted a conditional caution for assault from the police over the incident. He announced his intention to divorce Lawson, stating that the couple had "become estranged and drifted apart". Lawson made no public comment; however, Lawson filed for divorce citing ongoing unreasonable behaviour. On 31 July 2013, Saatchi and Lawson were granted a decree nisi effectively ending their 10-year marriage with court documents suggesting that the two had already arrived at a private financial settlement.

== Pre-trial hearings ==
In an unusual move, on 26 November 2013 in a pre-trial hearing the presiding judge, Robin Johnson, lifted an order that had prevented publication of claims made in pre-trial proceedings on 15 November. In a "bad character" defence relating to Lawson, enabling her to be cross-examined during the trial, the Grillo alleged that Lawson permitted their personal use of the private company credit card, in return for their non-disclosure to Saatchi of Lawson's believed use, for at least ten years, of cocaine and cannabis (Class A and B drugs respectively) nor her unauthorised use of prescription drugs. The defence counsel for, Anthony Metzer, QC, instructed through Janes Solicitors, said that while the arrangement was not verbalised, it amounted to a "tacit understanding".

Saatchi has stated that he was unaware of this reported situation until a late stage of the couple's marriage. The prosecuting counsel Jane Carpenter described the Grillos' claims about Lawson's drug use as "totally scurrilous" .

On 27 November, the defence Anthony Metzer, QC, attempted to have the case thrown out as an abuse of process on the grounds that the two prosecution witnesses, Lawson and Saatchi, could not be "witnesses of truth". This application was rejected by the judge.

== The trial ==
On 27 November 2013, the trial began.

Saatchi testified that it had been Lawson's idea to give the Grillo's credit cards. He stated that he had not authorized the Grillos' purchases himself, but was unable to say whether Lawson had approved them. He testified that he had never seen Lawson take illegal drugs, but added that the drug accusations against Lawson were "pretty compelling". Lawson had been "very cross" when he told her that he had confronted the Grillos over their credit card use, Saatchi stated. Although Saatchi wanted to deal with the matter privately, Lawson suggested involving the police. Saatchi also testified that he was "bereft" [sic] that his email about the drug allegations had been made public. Lawson admitted to taking cocaine and cannabis but denied she was or is addicted, she stated, "I found it made an intolerable situation tolerable. It’s a false friend. I found the answer was in changing the situation and trying to create a tolerable situation for me and my family. Since freeing myself from a brilliant but brutal man, I’m now totally cannabis-, cocaine- and drug-free."

Saatchi's finance director, Rahul Gajaar, testified that, after the couple's former assistants' alleged unauthorised spending had been uncovered, he suggested that they pay off the debt gradually over a long period. However, the Grillos stated they were innocent they rather go in front of jury.

Sharrine Scholtz, another former employee of Charles Saatchi, testified that personal versus business spending on the cards was not distinguished. Scholtz allegedly processed credit statements and allocated spending on items like beauty treatments, clothes, hotels, and shopping to business accounts. When Scholtz wanted to leave Saatchi's employment, she alleges she was threatened over taxi fares she had been allowed to claim and was falsely accused of stealing from petty cash. She testified that, if she did not sign an agreement her employer wanted, she "thought perhaps [she] would be standing [accused in court] instead of the sisters ".

== Verdict ==
On 20 December 2013, the jury found both sisters not guilty.

== Aftermath ==
On 12 December 2019, Saatchi started proceedings against Rahul Gajaar, a key witness in the case against the Grillos, who worked for Saatchi as a finance director for 16 years until February 2019 when he was accused by Saatchi of misappropriation of company assets and misuse of the company credit card for personal use.

== See also ==
- List of Supreme Court of Judicature cases
