= Robert of Mortain =

11th-century Norman nobleman and the uterine half-brother of William the Conqueror

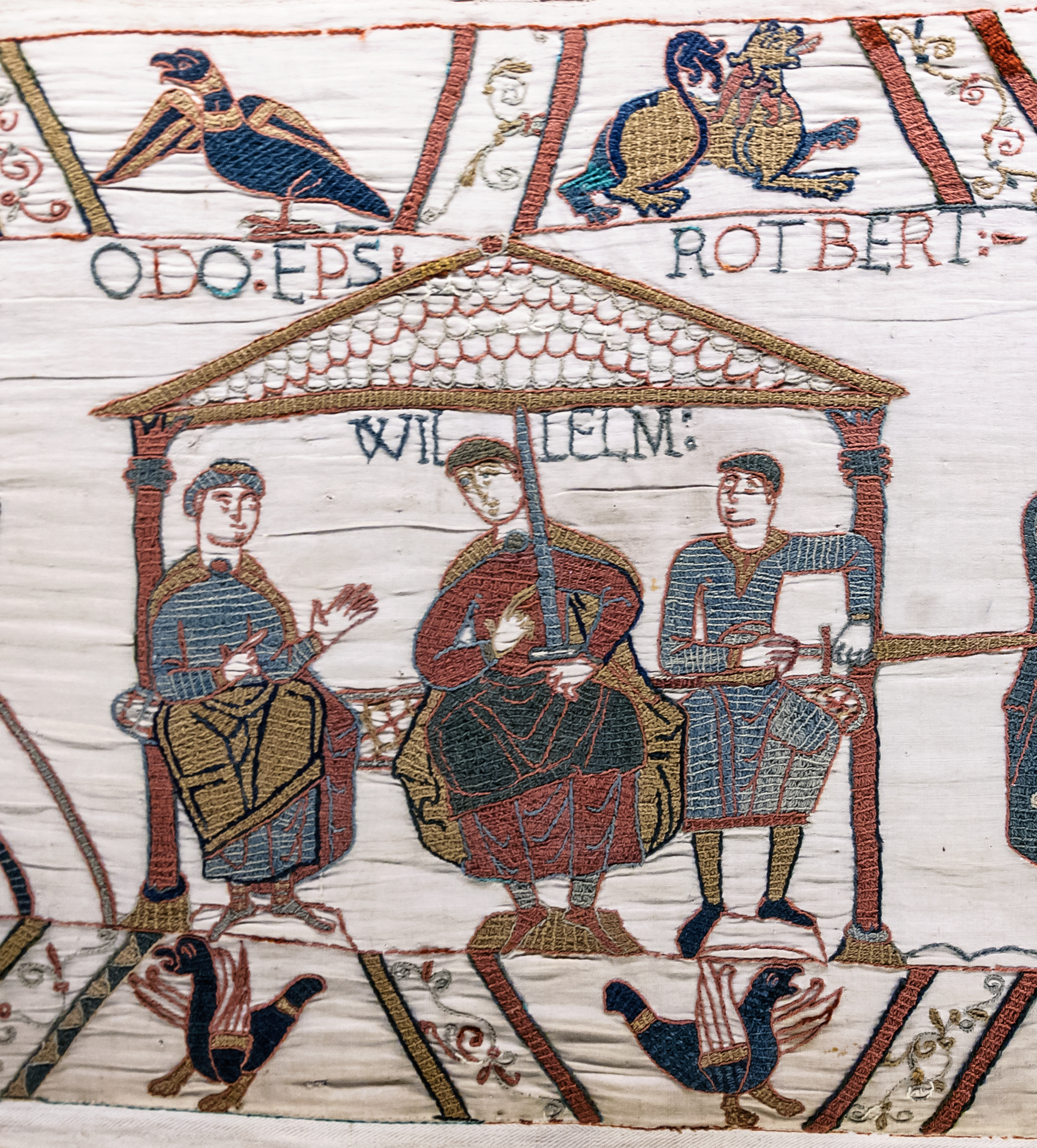
Robert (Rotbert), Count of Mortain (right) sits at the left hand of his half-brother William, Duke of Normandy. Robert's full brother Odo (Odo Ep[iscopu]s, "Bishop Odo") sits to William's right, implying his seniority. This scene in the Bayeux Tapestry occurs near Hastings, immediately before William ordered the building of a castle there, shortly before the Battle of Hastings.

Robert (c. 1031–c. 1095), count of Mortain and earl of Cornwall, was a Norman nobleman and the maternal half-brother of King William the Conqueror of England. He was one of the very few proven companions of William the Conqueror at the Battle of Hastings in 1066, and, as recorded in the Domesday Book of 1086, was one of the greatest landholders in his half-brother's new Kingdom of England.

== Life ==
Robert was the son of Herluin de Conteville and Herleva of Falaise and brother of Odo of Bayeux. Robert was born c. 1031 in Normandy, a half-brother of William the Conqueror. and was probably not more than a year or so younger than his brother Odo, born c. 1030. About 1035, Herluin, as Vicomte of Conteville, along with his wife Herleva and Robert, founded Grestain Abbey in Normandy.

=== Count of Mortain ===
Around 1049 his brother Duke William made him Count of Mortain, in place of William Werlenc, who had been banished by Duke William; according to Orderic Vitalis, on a single word. William Werlenc was a grandson of Duke Richard I and therefore a cousin once removed to William, Duke of Normandy. Securing the southern border of Normandy was critical to Duke William and Robert was entrusted with this key county which guarded the borders of Brittany and Bellême.

=== Conquest of England ===
In early 1066, Robert was present at both the first Council of Lillebonne, that of William's inner circle, and the second larger council held to discuss the Duke's planned conquest of England. Robert agreed to provide 120 ships to the invasion fleet, which was more than any other of William's magnates. Robert was one of those few known to have been at the Battle of Hastings in 1066. He is pictured at a dinner at Pevensey on the Bayeux Tapestry, seated with his brothers William and Odo on the day of the landing in England. When granting the monastery of St Michael's Mount in Cornwall to the Norman monastery on the Mont-Saint-Michel in Normandy, Robert recorded that he had fought at the Battle of Hastings under the banner of St Michael (habens in bello Sancti Michaelis vexillum).

=== Lands granted by William the Conqueror ===
Robert's contribution to the success of the invasion was clearly regarded as highly significant by the Conqueror, who awarded him a large share of the spoils; in total 797 manors at the time of Domesday. The greatest concentration of his honours lay in Cornwall where he held virtually all of that Earldom and was considered by some the Earl of Cornwall. (Note: His position of authority in the south west has therefore led many to consider him as the Earl of Cornwall, although it appears uncertain whether he was formally created as such. The Complete Peerage, III, 428 states while he may have been considered the earl he was only known officially as Comes Moritoniensis. According to Charles Henderson "Count Robert did not call himself Earl of Cornwall [but] enjoyed the power that in the following century belonged to the earls, and after them the dukes". See: Henderson, C. G. (1933) "Cornwall and her patron saint", In: his Essays in Cornish History. Oxford: Clarendon Press; pp. 197–201.) While Robert held lands in twenty counties, the majority of his holdings in certain counties was as few as five manors. The overall worth of his estates was £2100. He administered most of his southwestern holdings from Launceston, Cornwall, and Montacute in Somerset. The holding of single greatest importance was the rape of Pevensey (east Sussex) which protected one of the more vulnerable parts of the south coast of England.

== Later life ==
In 1069, together with Robert of Eu, he led an army against a force of Danes in Lindsey and effected great slaughter against them. After that there is little mention of Robert who appears to have been an absentee landholder spending the majority of his time in Normandy. Along with his brother Odo he participated in a revolt in 1088 against William II but afterwards he was pardoned. Robert died in 1095, possibly on 9 December, and chose to be buried at Grestain Abbey in Normandy, near his father and next to his first wife Matilda.

== Character ==
He was described by William of Malmesbury in his Gesta Regum Anglorum as a man of stupid dull disposition (crassi et hebetis ingenii). William the Conqueror considered him one of his greatest supporters and trusted him with the important county of Mortain. Further clues to his character are found in the Vita of Vitalis of Savigny, a very wise monk whom Robert sought out as his chaplain. One incident tells of Robert beating his wife and Vital, intervening, threatened to end the marriage if Robert did not repent. In still another entry Vital tells of his leaving Robert's service abruptly and after being escorted back to him, Robert begged for Vital's pardon for his actions. Overall, Robert was proficient in every duty William assigned him. He was a religious man yet ill-tempered enough to beat his wife, but was not known as a man of great wisdom.

== Family ==
Robert was married to Matilda, daughter of Roger de Montgomery, 1st Earl of Shrewsbury, before 1066 and together they had:

- William, Count of Mortain, who succeeded him, was offered to wed Mary of Scotland.
- Agnes who married André de Vitré, seigneur of Vitré.
- Denise, married in 1078 to Guy, 2nd Sire de Laval.
- Emma of Mortain (ca. 1058 – 1080), married to William IV of Toulouse, Duke of Narbonne.

Through Emma's daughter Philippa, Countess of Toulouse, Robert was the great-great-grandfather of Eleanor of Aquitaine and hence an ancestor of all English monarchs after Henry II.

After Matilda de Montgomery's death in 1084 Robert secondly married Almodis. The couple had no children.

== Portrayals on screen ==
On screen, Robert has been portrayed by Gordon Whiting in the two-part BBC TV play Conquest (1966), part of the series Theatre 625, and by Richard Ireson in the TV drama Blood Royal: William the Conqueror (1990).

== Notes ==
French nobility
Preceded by William Warlenc	Count of Mortain; 1049–1095	Succeeded by William
Peerage of England
Preceded by Brian of Brittany	Earl of Cornwall; 1072–1095	Succeeded by William
