= Milton-next-Gravesend =

Ecclesiastical parish in Kent, England

Milton
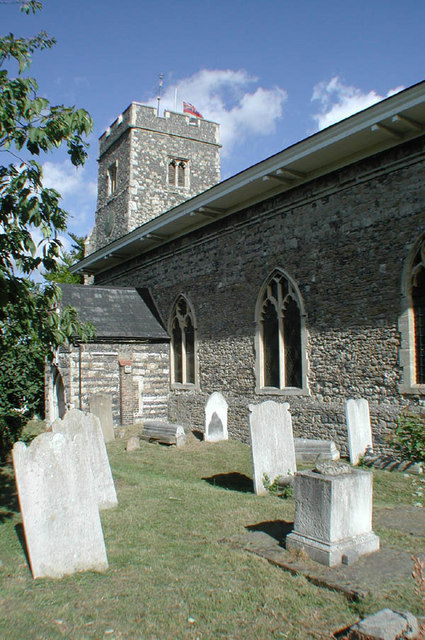
- SS Peter & Paul church

- Location within Kent
- District: Gravesham
- Shire county: Kent
- Region: South East
- Country: England
- Sovereign state: United Kingdom

Milton-next-Gravesend is an area and ecclesiastical parish, part of the Gravesend built-up area, in the Gravesham district, north-west of Kent, England.

== History ==
Feudal ownership of land in the parish was the subject of a legal action of 1076, Abbot Scotland v Hamo the Sherrif [sic], leading to St Augustine's Abbey, Canterbury taking back its stake in ownership.

Neighbouring Gravesend became a town under Royal Charter in the 13th century and included Milton. The Church of England's founding was heralded by Henry VIII's split with Rome and the Dissolution of the Monasteries by which all of the abbots were retired, and their institutions' endowments – such as in this parish – were confiscated.

Until about the 1840s, much of the population was scattered in rural farmhouses, country houses and cottages or those living along the east side of the High Street and thus not in Gravesend parish. The boundary between the two parishes is along the middle of Gravesend's High Street (which puts the old Town Hall in Milton, not Gravesend) then Windmill Street and Singlewell Road. Just as Northfleet developed to the west of Gravesend, so decennial censuses record that this parish saw an almost fourfold increase in population between 1831 and 1901 (from 4,348 to 9,256, in 1851, to 15,534 in 1901). In the next ten year census the number of houses slightly increased, as did occupation rates; the population next stood at 14,994.

Occupations 'of families and of servants' in 1831 in Milton grouped by Status
Employers and Professionals	108
Middling Sorts	287
Labourers and Servants	511
Others	96

On 1 April 1915 the parish was abolished and merged with Gravesend. It is now in the unparished area of Gravesend.

== Churches ==
Two churches co-exist: the ancient parish church, dedicated to St Peter and Paul (at 51°26′21″N 0°23′08″E) at the heart of the old settlement; and Christ Church at the western end of the parish, built in 1856 when the town of Gravesend began to grow eastwards. In other faith centres, the parish has the more protestant place of worship of St Paul's United Reformed Church, and two small independent churches/chapels.

St Peter and St Paul saw five of its bells cast in 1656 by John Hodson. A treble was added in 1810 (cast by Thomas Mears II) and the ring was augmented to 8 by two new trebles in 1930 (cast by Mears & Stainbank). The tenor is just under 12 long cwt (1,300 lb or 600 kg), tuned to F#.

== Notable people ==
Sarah Baker (c.1735–1816), actress and theatre manager, was born here.
