= Hext v Yeomans =

1583 English court case

Hext v Yeomans (1583) is an early defamation case wherein the Court found that slander do not lie upon inferences. It was the origin of the mitior sensus doctrine, imputing a mere intention to commit a crime was held to be nonactionable.

The defendant referred to as Yeoman was accused of saying to Hext I doubt not but to see thee hanged for stricking Mr Sydmans man, who was murdered. The judge found that Yeoman had not actually asserted it was Hext who had done the murder, merely that he had struck him.
