= Foley v Classique Coaches Ltd. =

1934 English contract law case

Foley v Classique Coaches Ltd. [1934] 2 KB 1 is an English contract law case decided in 1934 relating to restraint of trade and forward-looking agreements to agree. The initial judgment delivered in the High Court held that there was no "undue" restraint of trade, and this was upheld in the Court of Appeal.

== Details ==
The plaintiff sold some land to the defendants as a location for their motor coach business, subject to a further agreement that the defendant would buy petrol from the plaintiff.

One factor addressed in the case looked at whether the agreement to agree on prices "in writing and from time to time" made the agreement void for uncertainty, but it was held that a term was to be implied into the agreement that, in the absence of agreement, the price of the petrol was to be a reasonable price: if that could not be agreed, it could be settled by arbitration, as the agreement included provision for arbitration.

In his speech Lord Maugham stated:

It is indisputable that unless all the material terms of the contract are agreed there is no binding obligation. An agreement to agree in the future is not a contract; nor is there a contract if a material term is neither settled nor implied by law and the document contains no machinery for ascertaining it.

The proposition that "unless all the material terms of a contract are agreed, there is no binding obligation" can be treated as one of "the usual principles" of contract law.
