= Kenrick v Lawrence =

British legal case

- Court: Queen's Bench Division
- Decided: 1890
- Citation: LR 25, QBD 99

Kenrick v Lawrence (1890) L.R. 25, Q.B.D. 99 was a seminal English case on the nature of copyright. In it the court establishes the extent for which copyright protection is given for a work and at which point it crosses the line from "expression", which is protected, to "idea", which is not.

A company held the copyright in a drawing of a hand, holding a pencil, and drawing a check-mark into a box. The drawing was used on voter cards to help the illiterate in voting. A rival company produced a card with a similar but not identical drawing of a hand drawing a check-mark in a box. They were sued for copyright infringement.

The Court mused on how detailed and accurate an imitator must be to constitute copyright infringement. The Court characterized the plaintiff claim as a claim to the subject matter itself, The defendant claimed, on the other hand, that only an exact reproduction could be protected. The Court took a middle ground, ruling that the greater the labour and skill invested into the work the broader the protection will be granted, while simpler works will receive narrower protection.

It seems to me, therefore, that although every drawing of whatever kind may be entitled to registration, the degree and kind of protection given must vary greatly with the character of the drawing, and that with such a drawing as we are dealing with the copyright must be confined to that which is special to the individual drawing over and above the idea...there are scarcely more ways that one of drawing a pencil or the hand that holds it. If the particular arrangement of square, cross, hand, or pencil be relied upon it is nothing more than a claim of copyright for the subject, which in my opinion cannot possibly be supported.
