= John v Anon =

John v Anon [c. 1290] BL. Add. 31826, fol. 169 is a very early common law case and shows the very early development of trust law, although the decision itself is not precedent setting. The significance of the case is rather that it records a detailed view of the proceedings when one went into chancery to purchase a writ. This case was very early in the common law era being heard only ten years after Edward II set up the division of various courts in the curia regis.

== The facts of the case ==
A particular tenement was granted to two men and to "the heirs engendered of their two bodies". The issue was that both men survived their children and grand children, so that their great grandchildren sought an estate. The Kings Council found for the defendant in this case.
