= Eaton v Allen =

Royal Coat of Arms of the United Kingdom

Eaton v Allen is an early and precedent setting court case in the area of defamation.

The court found that in defamation the mere intent without an act is not punishable.

The court found that the defendant's statement, "He is a brabler [sic], and a quarreller, for he gave his champion counsel to make a deed of gift of his goods, to kill me, and then to fly out of the country, but God preserved me", was nondefamatory.

The court also held it was non actionable to accuse a man of an impossible crime.
