= Ealdred v High Sheriff of Yorkshire =

Ealdred v Malet was a court case of early English law between Ealdred (the archbishop of York) and William Malet (the High Sheriff of Yorkshire) that occurred circa 1068. Ealdred was seeking the return of lands taken by the sherriff during the Conquest.

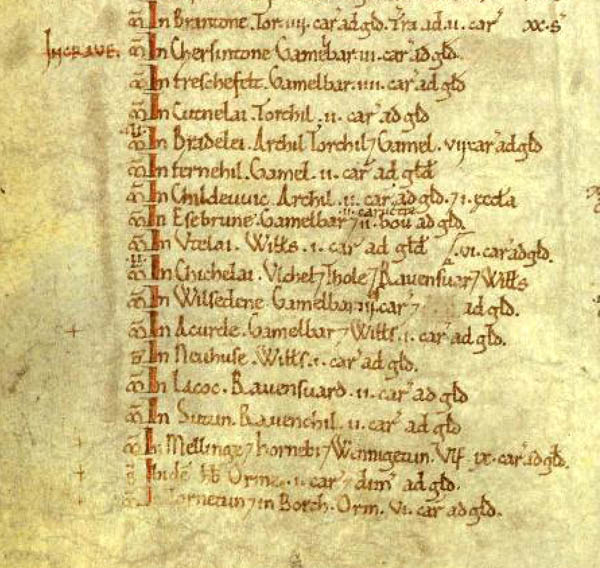
Domesday Book folio 301v.

As a viceroy of William, Ealdred already had the kings ear so in keeping with the mille of the time, the plaint (the plaintiff's statement in writing) was more informal than would be expected under the Common Law that developed under William's grandson. The goods were returned and the High Sheriff of Yorkshire chastened.

This court case is important as it can be viewed as a part of a large collection of pleadings against a process of Normanization that within a decade saw 64 per cent of land in England consolidated into the hands of just 150 individuals, and many of the nobility deprived of their estates.
