= Fulbert of Falaise =

Maternal grandfather of William the Conqueror

Fulbert of Falaise (fl. 11th century) was a Chamberlain of the Duke of Normandy and the maternal grandfather of William the Conqueror.

Little direct testimony survives of Fulbert. Early 12th century additions made by Norman chronicler Orderic Vitalis to the Gesta Normannorum Ducum report that William the Conqueror was born at Falaise, in Normandy, to an extramarital relationship between Robert I, Duke of Normandy and Herleva, daughter of Fulbert, the one-time Duke's Chamberlain (cubicularii ducis), an office to which he was likely appointed after William's birth. Orderic reports the birth of William as occurring at Falaise, presumed to be Herleva's native town, apparently from a relationship formed during the siege in 1026–1027.

Elsewhere, Orderic provides a more enigmatic description of William's ancestry. In an anecdote relating to the siege of Alençon (1051–1052), he reported that local residents had been mutilated by William after they called him a pelliciarius (pelterer), because his mother's kinsmen had been pollinctores, a term that seems not to have been clearly understood by French poets writing as early as the late 12th century, who translated it differently. Apparently based on this passage, Wace called Fulbert a tanner/skinner/furrier, while Benoît de Sainte-Maure referred to him as a tailor. In part due to flawed transcripts of Orderic dating from the 17th century, later historians often referred to Fulbert as a tanner, and several recent scholars have assigned him this traditional occupation, but Elisabeth van Houts has suggested an alternative translation of pollinctores, that Herleva's family had been embalmers or those who laid out bodies for burial.

Indirect evidence makes it unlikely Fulbert occupied such a lowly social status as a mere tanner, but rather was a member of the burgher class. His daughter Herleva was accepted by the Count of Flanders as a proper guardian for his own daughter, something unlikely were she born to a tradesman, while similarly the actions of two apparent sons of Fulbert in attesting documents for their underage nephew suggests a higher social status than a tradesman's sons would hold. Perhaps linking Orderic's two additions, contemporary practice made the chamberlain the court official responsible for overseeing burials, allowing the possibility that the Alençon episode was an allusion to William's grandfather being Chamberlain.

In addition to the well-documented daughter, Herleva, Fulbert apparently had two sons, Osbern or Osborn and Walter, named as 'uncles' of William the Conqueror but not among the well-documented siblings of his father Duke Robert. In an episode related by Orderic Vitalis, Walter is said to have once spirited away his nephew to hide him in a poor villager's cottage when the boy-duke was in danger of assassination. This Walter may in turn be the Walter of Falaise whose son William de Moulins was given holdings in Normandy similar to those received by known kinsmen of Duke William.
