= Mouse's case =

Landmark 1608 English law judgment

- Court: Court of King's Bench (England)
- Citation: (1572) 12 Co. Rep. 63, 77 ER 1341

Mouse's Case (1608) is a landmark English law judgment. The matter helped establish the defence of necessity in tort.

A ferryman was carrying forty-seven people, including one named Mouse, when a storm threatened the barge off Gravesend. Another passenger threw the cargo overboard to save the barge. Mouse's casket included £113 inside and he sued the passenger for its loss. The court found that in cases of necessity, any one may act to save lives and there is no liability to them, although there may be liability against the ferryman. It was, however, still incumbent on the ferryman to contribute to the reimburse of the loss.
