= Herleva =

Mother of William the Conqueror (c. 1005–1050)

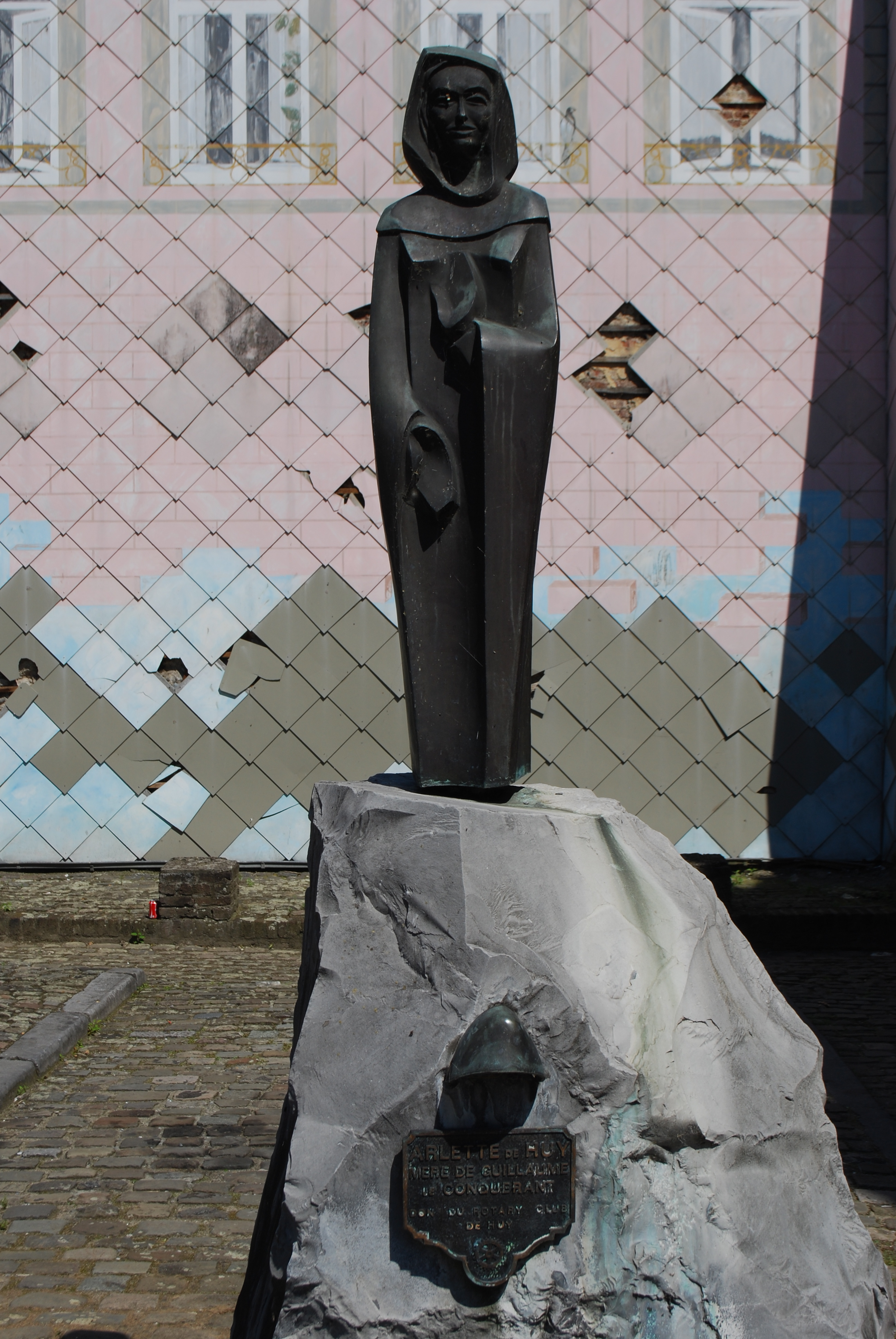
- Statue in Huy
- Born: c. 1005; Falaise, Duchy of Normandy, France
- Died: c. 1050 (aged about 45); Normandy
- Burial place: Grestain Abbey
- Spouse: Herluin de Conteville
- Partner: Robert I, Duke of Normandy
- Children: 5, including William the Conqueror, Odo of Bayeux and Robert, Count of Mortain
- Parents: Fulbert of Falaise (father); Doda (mother)

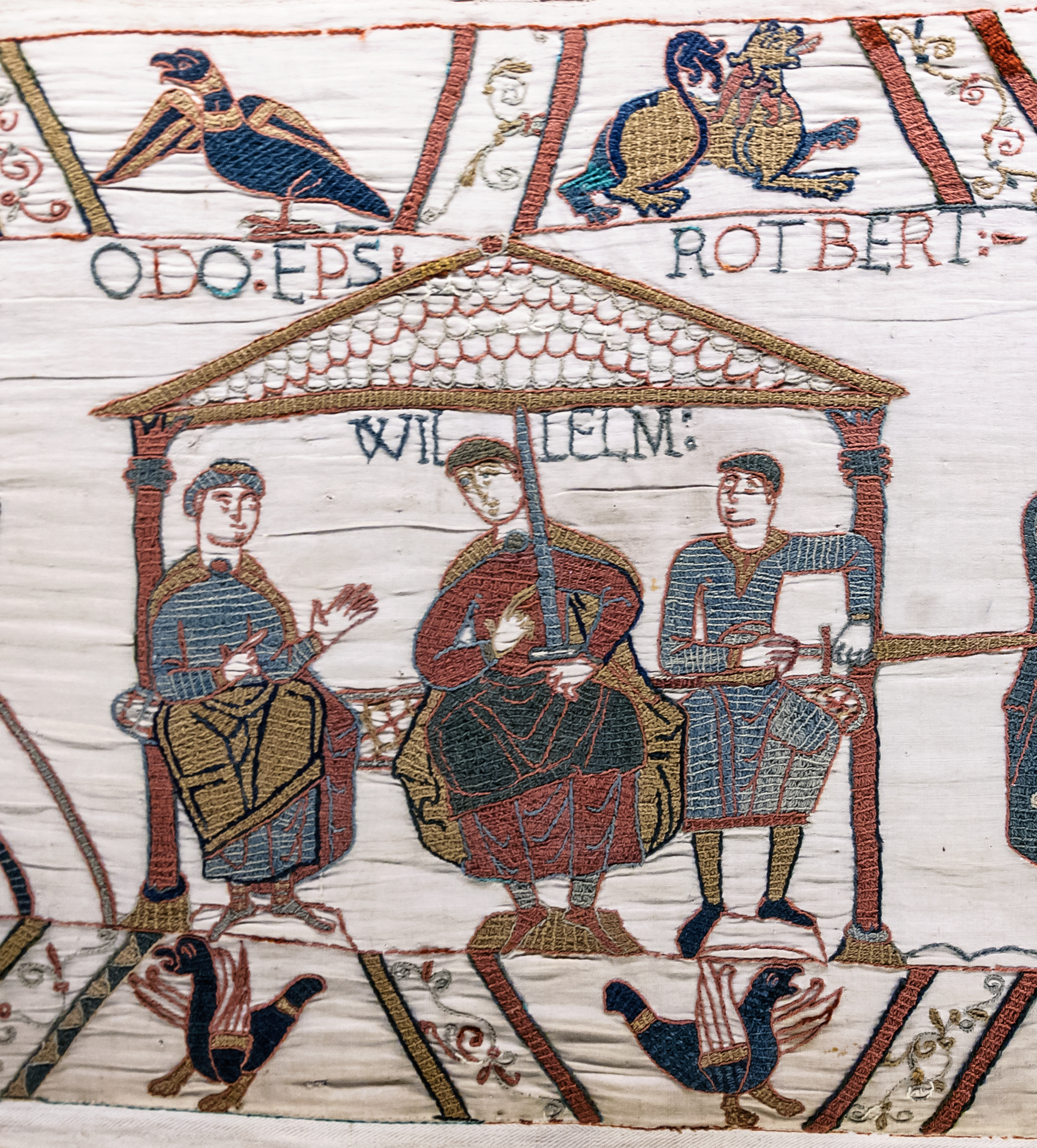
The three sons of Herleva of Falaise: William, Duke of Normandy, in the centre, Odo, the bishop of Bayeux, on the left and Robert, Count of Mortain, on the right (Bayeux Tapestry, 1070s)

Herleva (Note: Also known as Herleve, Arlette, Arletta, Arlotte, Arlotta, Arlot, Arlott and Harlette. Herleve is from the Old Danish / Old Norse names Herlef / Hærlæif, "warrior love relic", found on the Ingvar runestones. The forms in -ette, -otte are French pet names. It is etymologically unrelated to harlot.) (c. 1005 – c. 1050) was an 11th-century Norman woman known for having been the mother of William the Conqueror, born to an extramarital relationship with Robert I, Duke of Normandy, and also of William's prominent half-brothers Odo of Bayeux and Robert, Count of Mortain, born to Herleva's marriage to Herluin de Conteville.

== Life ==
Herleva's background and the circumstances of William's birth are shrouded in mystery. The written evidence dates from a generation or two later, and is not entirely consistent, but of all the Norman chroniclers only the Tours chronicler and William of Malmesbury, the latter thought to have simply copied the Tours source, assert that William's parents were subsequently joined in marriage. (Note: Tours chronicle: "Dux Robertus, nato dicto Guillelmo, in isto eodem anno matrem pueri, quam defloraverat, duxit in uxorem." (When the said William had been born, in that same year Duke Robert took as his wife the boy's mother, whom he had deflowered.)) According to Edward Augustus Freeman, the Tours chronicler's version cannot be true, because if Herleva married the Duke, then William's birth would have been legitimized, and thus he would not have been known as William the Bastard (Note: He was regularly described as bastardus (bastard) in non-Norman contemporary sources.) by his contemporaries.

The earliest source to refer to Herleva's origin is the early-12th-century additions made by Norman chronicler Orderic Vitalis to the Gesta Normannorum Ducum, where Herleva's father is named as Fulbert, who would become the Duke's Chamberlain (cubicularii ducis). Orderic reports the birth of William as occurring at Falaise, in Normandy, presumed to be Herleva's native town, apparently during 1026/7.

In a separate addition to the Gesta, Orderic relates an anecdote that has given rise to Fulbert being characterized with more humble origins, as a tanner. During his siege of Alençon, the townspeople are said to have called William peliciarius (pelterer) because his mother's kinsmen had been pollinctors. The latter is a rarely-used word, and two late-12th century poets, Wace and Benoît de Sainte-Maure, translate it differently, as parmentier (skinner/furrier/tanner) and peletier (tailor), respectively. An alternative suggested reading of pollinctors would see Fulbert as an embalmer, apothecary, or a person who laid out corpses for burial, the latter perhaps in turn an allusion to the court official who supervised that process, the chamberlain. Indirect evidence suggests that Herleva's father was not a lowly tanner but, rather, a member of the burgher class. Her brothers appear in a later document as attestors for an under-age William. Also, the Count of Flanders accepted Herleva as a proper guardian for his own daughter. Both of these would have been nearly impossible had Herleva's father only been a mere tanner, which would place his social standing little above that of a peasant.

According to one legend, her relationship with Robert began when he saw Herleva from the roof of his castle tower. The walkway on the roof still looks down on the dyeing trenches cut into stone in the courtyard below, which can be seen to this day from the tower ramparts above. The traditional way of dyeing leather or garments was to trample barefoot on the garments which were awash in the liquid dye in these trenches. Herleva, legend goes, seeing the Duke on his ramparts above, raised her skirts perhaps a bit more than necessary in order to attract the Duke's eye. The latter was immediately smitten and ordered her brought in (as was customary for any woman that caught the Duke's eye) through the back door. Herleva refused, saying she would only enter the Duke's castle on horseback through the front gate, and not as an ordinary commoner. The Duke, filled with lust, could only agree. In a few days, Herleva, dressed in the finest her father could provide, and sitting on a white horse, rode proudly through the front gate, her head held high. This gave Herleva a semi-official status as the Duke's concubine. She later gave birth to his son, William, in 1027 or 1028.

=== Marriage to Herluin de Conteville ===
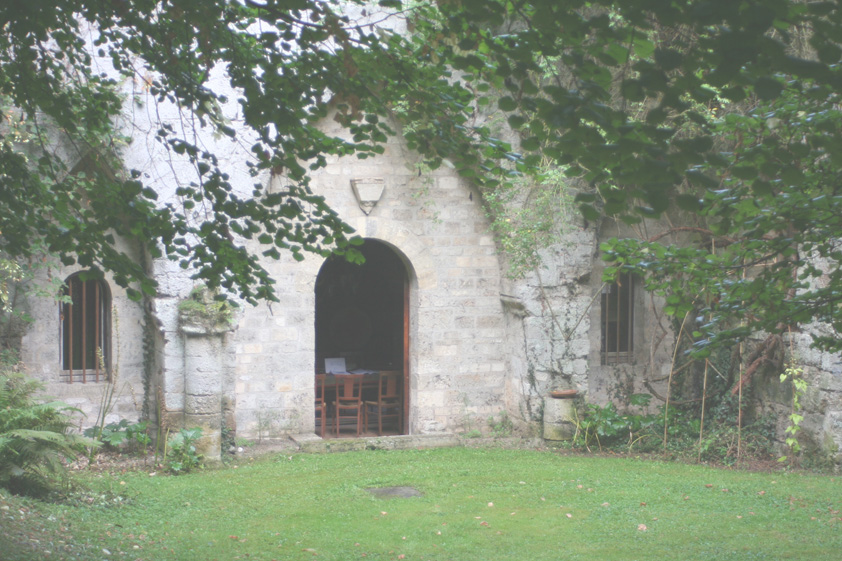
13th-century façade of the Abbey of Grestain, which was founded in 1050 by Herluin and Herleva

Herleva later married Herluin de Conteville in 1031. Some accounts maintain that Robert always loved her, but the gap in their social status made marriage impossible, so, to give her a good life, he married her off to one of his favourite noblemen.

From her marriage to Herluin she had two sons: Odo, who later became Bishop of Bayeux, and Robert, who became Count of Mortain. Both became prominent during William's reign. They also had at least two daughters: Emma, who married Richard le Goz, Viscount of Avranches, and a daughter of unknown name who married William, lord of la Ferté-Macé.

== Death ==
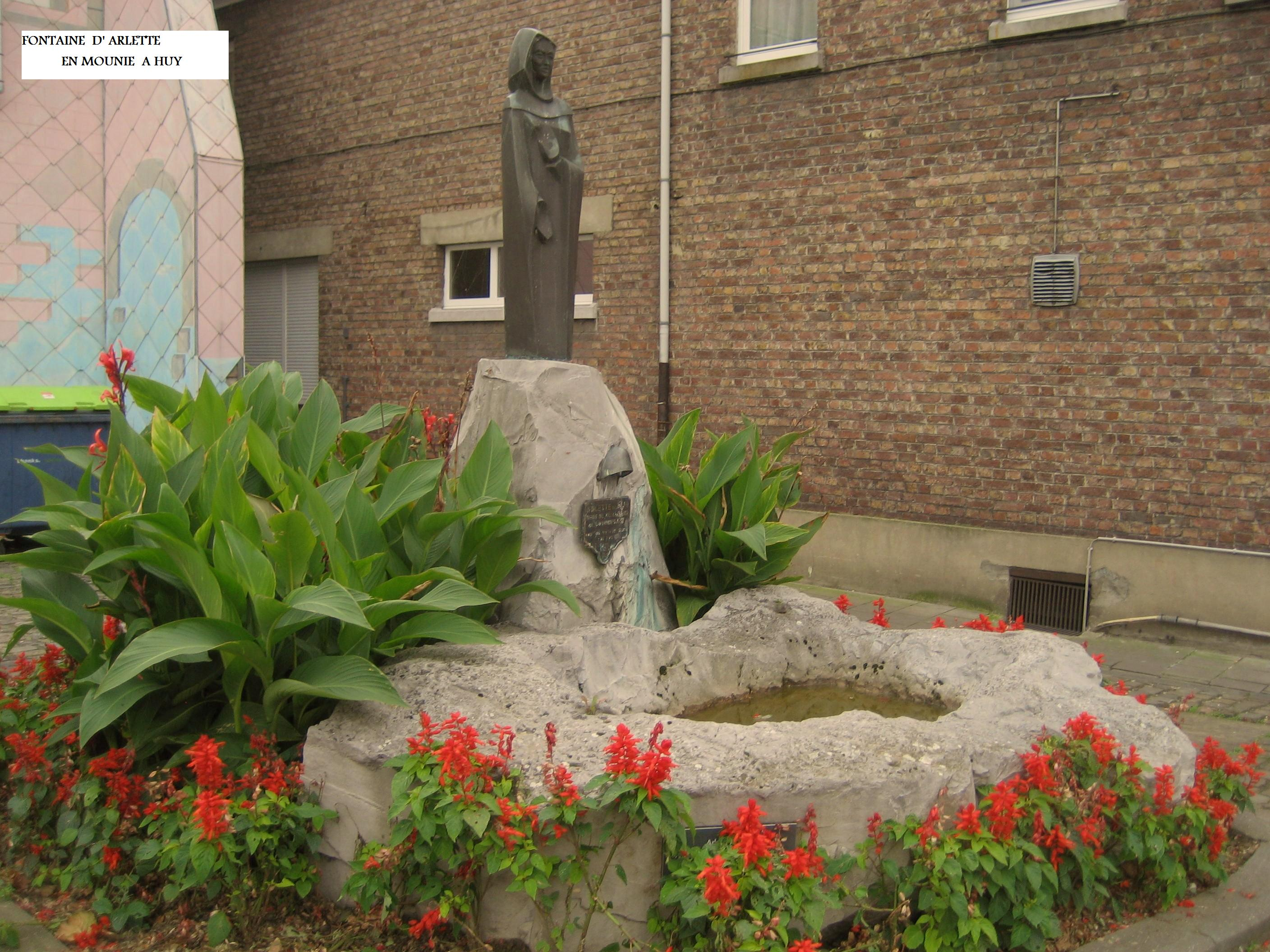
Statue of Arlette in Huy, Belgium, where the mother of William the Conqueror is considered a child of the country

According to Robert of Torigni, Herleva was buried at the abbey of Grestain, which was founded by Herluin and their son Robert around 1050. This would put Herleva in her forties around the time of her death. (Note: David C. Douglas suggests that Herleva probably died before Herluin founded the abbey because her name does not appear on the list of benefactors, whereas the name of Herluin's second wife, Fredesendis, does.)
