= Haxey's case =

UK legal case

Haxey's case (1397) Rotuli Parliamentorum (iii) 434, is a UK constitutional law case that established the right to free speech within Parliament.

== Facts ==
In January 1397, Sir Thomas Haxey presented a petition to Parliament, criticising the costs of King Richard II of England's household. The king was affronted and, with the collusion of Thomas Arundel, insisted that Haxey be punished for treason. Haxey was deprived of his title and his possessions. However, the king went on to pardon Haxey, and it has been suggested that the case was deliberately orchestrated to criminalize criticism of the king.

== Judgment ==
On deposing Richard in 1399, Henry IV of England successfully petitioned Parliament to reverse its judgment against Haxey as "…against the law and custom which had been before in Parliament."
