= Odo of Bayeux =

Bishop of Bayeux and half-brother of William the Conqueror (died 1097)

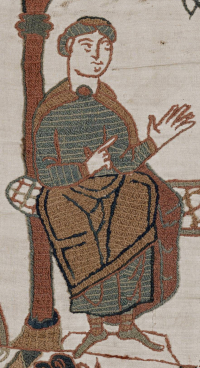
- Odo as seen on the Bayeux Tapestry
- Died: 1097; Palermo
- Title: Earl of Kent; Bishop of Bayeux
- Parents: Herluin de Conteville (father); Herleva (mother)
- Relatives: Robert of Mortain (brother); William the Conqueror (maternal half-brother); Adelaide of Normandy (possible maternal half-sister)

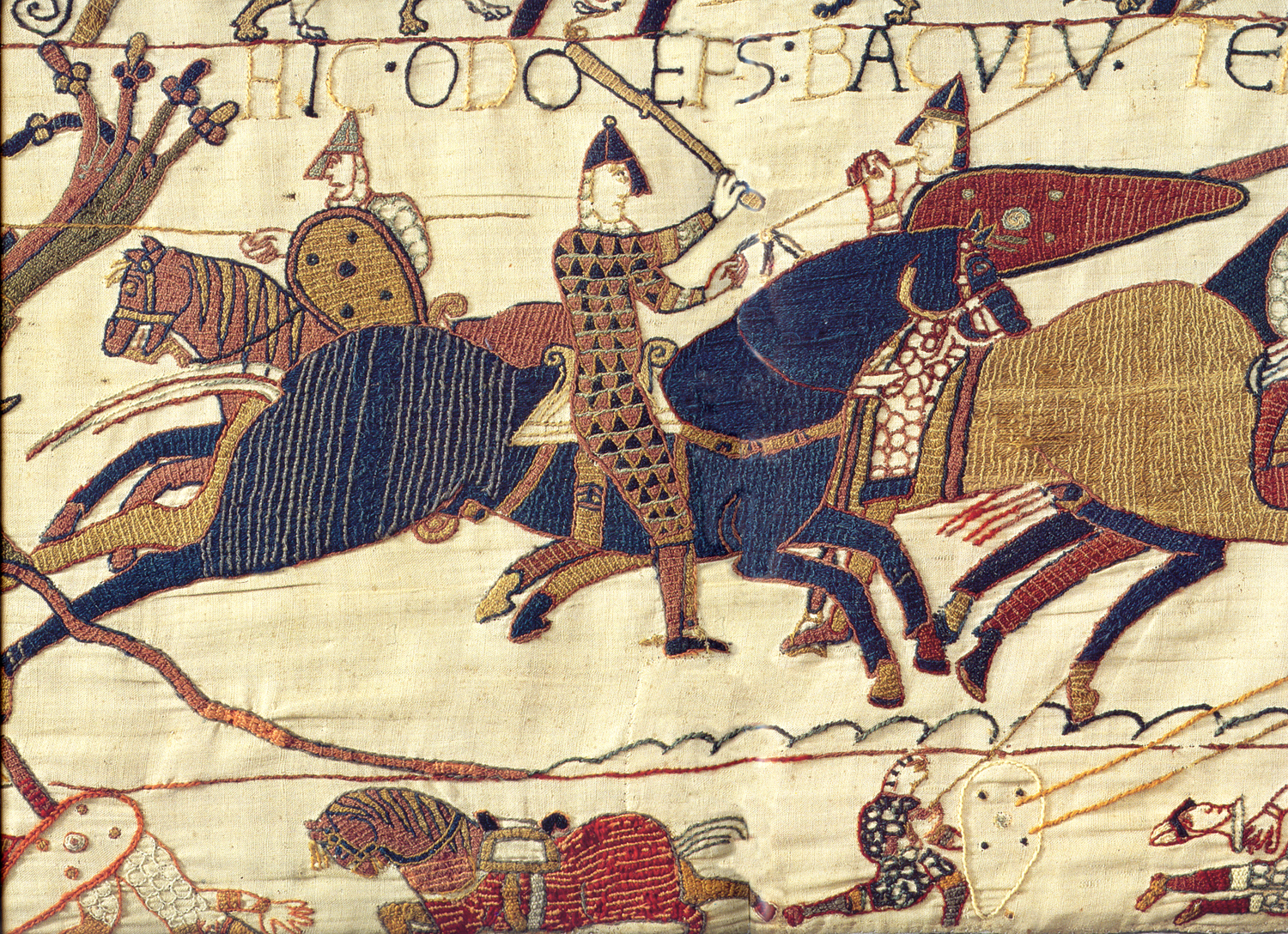
Scene in the Bayeux Tapestry showing Odo rallying Duke William's troops during the Battle of Hastings in 1066. Latin tituli above: HIC ODO EP[ISCOPU]S BACULU[M] TENENS CONFORTAT PUEROS ("Here Bishop Odo, holding a club, gives strength to the boys"). Duke William is also shown wielding a club during the battle in another scene.

Odo of Bayeux (died 1097) was a Norman nobleman who was a bishop of Bayeux in Normandy and was made Earl of Kent in England following the Norman Conquest. He was the maternal half-brother of duke, and later king, William the Conqueror, and was, for a time, William's primary administrator in the Kingdom of England, although he was eventually tried for defrauding William's government. It is likely Odo commissioned the Bayeux Tapestry, a large tableau of the Norman Conquest, perhaps to present to his brother William. He later fell out with his brother over Odo's support for military adventures in Italy. William, on his deathbed, freed Odo. Odo died in Palermo, Sicily, on the way to crusade.

== Early life ==
Odo was the son of William the Conqueror's mother Herleva and Herluin de Conteville. Count Robert of Mortain was his elder brother. There is uncertainty about his birth date. Some historians have suggested he was born around 1035. Odo took clerical vows in 1049 and in the same year Duke William made his half brother bishop of Bayeux, but after the reforming Council of Reims. It has been suggested that his birth was as early as 1030, making him about nineteen rather than fourteen at the time although this was still below the canonical requirement for a bishop to be aged at least thirty.

== Norman Conquest and after ==
Although Odo was an ordained Christian cleric, he is best known as a warrior and statesman, participating in the Council of Lillebonne. He funded ships for the Norman invasion of England and is one of the very few proven companions of William the Conqueror known to have fought at the Battle of Hastings in 1066.

In 1067, Odo became Earl of Kent, and for some years he was a trusted royal minister. On some occasions when William was absent (back in Normandy), he served as regent of England, and at times he led the royal forces against rebellions (e.g. the Revolt of the Earls): the precise sphere of his powers is not certain. There are also other occasions when he accompanied William back to Normandy.

During this time Odo acquired vast estates in England, larger in extent than anyone except the king: he had land in twenty-three counties, primarily in the south east and in East Anglia.

== Bayeux Tapestry ==
The rebuilding of Bayeux Cathedral which had started under his predecessor after it had burned in 1046 was completed in 1080. To coincide with the consecration of the almost-complete cathedral in 1077, the Bayeux Tapestry, created in Canterbury, was likely first installed and displayed inside the cathedral following the ceremony.

The tapestry appears to labour the point that he did not actually fight, that is to say shed blood, at Hastings, but rather encouraged the troops from the rear. The annotation above his image translated into English reads "Here Odo the bishop holding a club strengthens the boys". It has been suggested that his clerical status forbade him from using a sword, though this is doubtful: the club was a common weapon and used often by leadership including by Duke William himself, depicted in the same part of the tapestry. However other chroniclers in both the eleventh and twelfth century wrote that he carried a baton or mace. Odo was accompanied by the carrier of his crozier, named William, and a retinue of servants and members of his household.

== Trial, imprisonment, and rebellion ==
In 1076, at the trial of Penenden Heath, Odo was tried in front of a large and senior assembly over the course of three days at Penenden Heath in Kent for defrauding the Crown and the Diocese of Canterbury. At the conclusion of the trial he was forced to return a number of properties and his assets were re-apportioned.

In 1082, Odo was suddenly disgraced and imprisoned, although there are competing explanations with chroniclers such as Wace proposing domestic reasons such as repression or embezzlement. Chroniclers writing a generation later claimed he planned a military expedition to Italy trying to take the King's vassals without his knowledge. and desired to make himself pope during the Investiture Controversy while Pope Gregory VII was in severe difficulty in his conflict with Henry IV, Holy Roman Emperor, and the position of pope was in contention. When William was informed he crossed the channel to confront Odo, although there is evidence that Odo was arrested some time after William landed. It was reported that due to Odo's power none of the magnates were prepared to condemn him and none of the sergeants were prepared to arrest him, and William had to do both. Odo apparently protested that as a bishop only the Pope could take this action and William replied that he was being arrested as an Earl.

Whatever the reason for his arrest, Odo spent the next five years in prison in William's stronghold of Rouen and his English estates were taken back by the king, as was his office as Earl of Kent. Odo was not deposed as Bishop of Bayeux. On his deathbed in 1087, King William I was reluctantly persuaded by his half-brother, Robert, Count of Mortain, to release Odo. After the king's death, Odo returned to England. William's eldest son, Robert Curthose, had been made duke of Normandy, while Robert's brother William Rufus had received the throne of England. The bishop supported Robert Curthose's claim to England. The Rebellion of 1088 failed and William Rufus permitted Odo to leave the kingdom. Afterwards, Odo remained in the service of Robert in Normandy.

Odo joined the First Crusade as part of his nephew Robert's army that was bound for Jerusalem, but died on the way whilst visiting Palermo in January or February 1097. He was buried in Palermo Cathedral.

== Sources ==
- Bates, David (1975). "The Character and Career of Odo, Bishop of Bayeux (1049/50–1097)". Speculum. 50: 1–20. JSTOR 2856509.
- Bates, David (September 2004). "Odo, earl of Kent (d. 1097)". Oxford Dictionary of National Biography. Oxford Dictionary of National Biography (online ed.). Oxford University Press. doi:10.1093/ref:odnb/20543. (Subscription, Wikipedia Library access or UK public library membership required.)
- Dean, Sidney E. (2013). "Brother in Arms: Odo, Bishop of Bayeux, Earl of Kent". Medieval Warfare. 3 (2): 9–13. JSTOR 48578212.
- Ireland, William Henry (1829). England's Topographer: or A New and Complete History of the County of Kent. London: G. Virtue.
- Morris, Marc (2012). The Norman Conquest: The Battle of Hastings and the Fall of Anglo-Saxon England. New York: Random House. ISBN 978-1-4481-3602-5.

Peerage of England
Vacant Norman conquest Title last held by Leofwine Godwinson; As Anglo-Saxon earl	Earl of Kent; 1067–1088	Vacant Title forfeit Title next held by William of Ypres

Preceded by Possibly William Peverel: Confirmed until 14 October 1066 Bertram Ashburnham	Constable of Dover Castle; December 1066 or January 1067 – 1082	Succeeded by Vacant until 1084: John de Fiennes
