= List of governors-general of Australia =

Flag of the governor-general of Australia

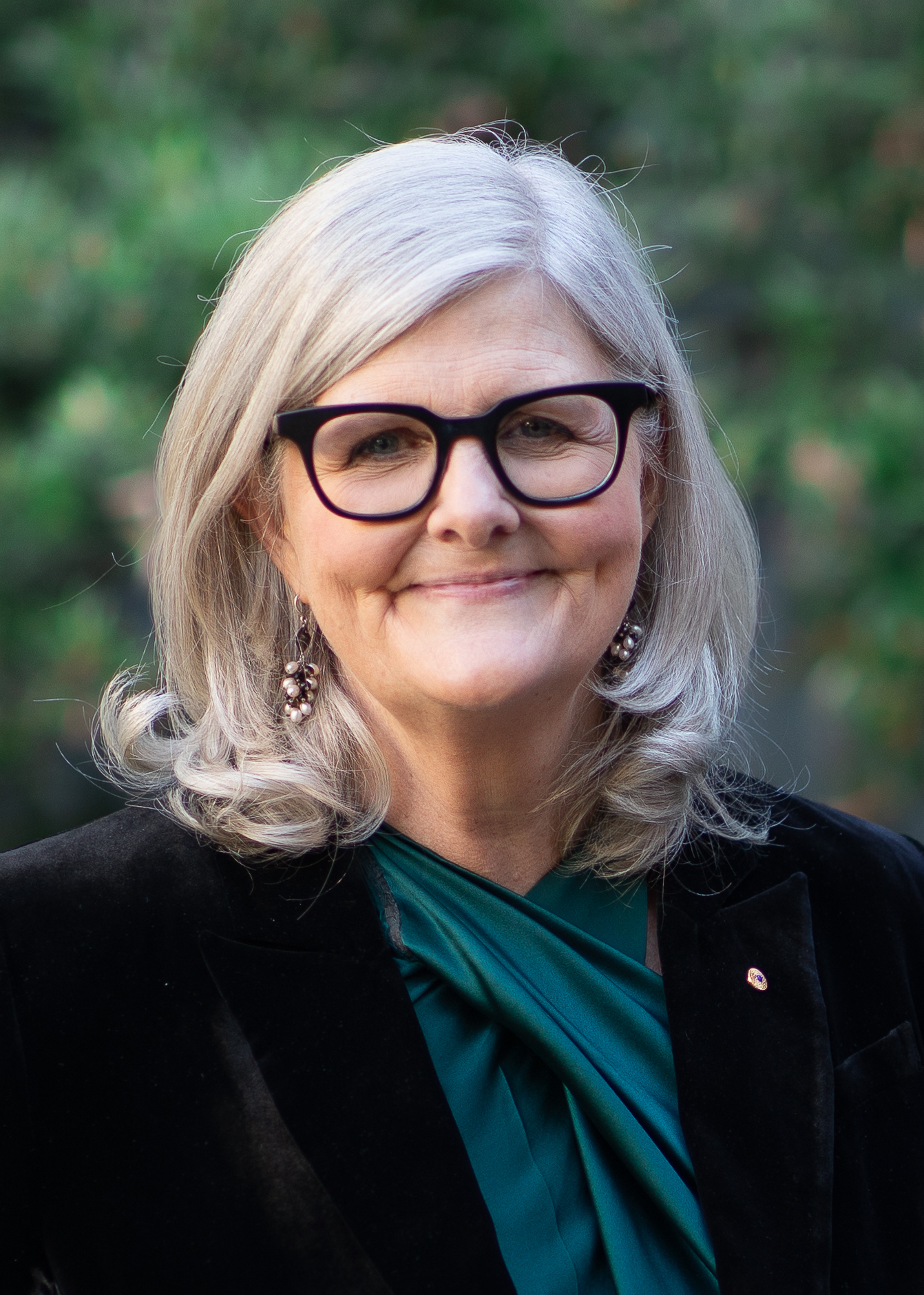
Sam Mostyn is the current and 28th governor-general of Australia since 2024.

The governor-general of Australia is the federal representative of the Australian monarch (currently Charles III). The position came into being on 29 October 1900 with the establishment of the first Commonwealth office, just prior to the adoption of the new national constitution and has been held by 28 people since then. Because governors-general are appointed at His Majesty's pleasure, there is no fixed term, but governors-general are usually given a 5-year term.

== Background ==
For the first two decades after federation, governors-general were selected solely by the British government. The monarch was consulted on the decision into the 1930s. The first four governors-general were peers; Sir Ronald Munro Ferguson (appointed 1914) was the first commoner to hold the position, although he was also later elevated to the peerage. In 1920, Billy Hughes became the first prime minister to be consulted over the governor-generalship. Stanley Bruce (1925) and Joseph Lyons (1935) either asked for or were given a list of suitable candidates to choose from.

James Scullin (1930) became the first prime minister of Australia to exercise complete discretion in the appointment; his nomination of Sir Isaac Isaacs made Australia the first Dominion to have a native-born governor-general. In 1945, John Curtin nominated Prince Henry, Duke of Gloucester, to the post. Henry was the first and only royal officeholder to take up the office — in October 1938, Prince George, Duke of Kent had been announced as successor to Lord Gowrie with effect from November 1939, but on 11 September 1939, the Duke's appointment was postponed due to the outbreak of the Second World War. Prince George died in 1942 and thus his appointment never eventuated, instead Lord Gowrie continued in office in Australia until 1945, creating a still-unsurpassed record term of over 9 years. A second Australian (William McKell) was appointed in 1947; he was followed by three more Britons, each chosen by Sir Robert Menzies. Menzies's fourth nomination was Richard Casey, who took office in 1965; he and all subsequent governors-general have been Australian citizens. All Australian states except South Australia and Tasmania have provided at least one appointee (although the latter of these provided an Administrator of the Commonwealth for several months in 2003). The first female governor-general, Quentin Bryce, took office in 2008.

== List of officeholders ==
| No. | Portrait | Name (Birth–Death) | Term of office | | | Monarch Reign | Prime Minister Term of office | Ref. |
| No. | Portrait | Name (Birth–Death) | Took office | Left office | Time in office | Monarch Reign | Prime Minister Term of office | Ref. |
|---|---|---|---|---|---|---|---|---|
| 1 | | John Hope; 7th Earl of Hopetoun (1860–1908) | 1 January 1901 (Note: Queen Victoria appointed Lord Hopetoun as Australia's first governor-general on 14 July 1900 and signed this document, legally establishing the office, on 29 October 1900. However, it was not until 1 January 1901 that he took the oath of office at the inauguration ceremony.) | 17 July 1902 (Note: Hopetoun left for England on 17 July 1902. Lord Tennyson, the governor of South Australia, was appointed Administrator of the Government until formally taking over the governor-generalship on 9 January 1903.) | 1 year, 197 days | Victoria (1837–1901) | Edmund Barton (1901–1903) | |
| 1 | | John Hope; 7th Earl of Hopetoun (1860–1908) | 1 January 1901 | 17 July 1902 | 1 year, 197 days | Edward VII (1901–1910) | Edmund Barton (1901–1903) | |
| 2 | | Hallam Tennyson; 2nd Baron Tennyson (1852–1928) | 9 January 1903 | 21 January 1904 | 1 year, 12 days | Edward VII (1901–1910) | Edmund Barton (1901–1903) | |
| 2 | | Hallam Tennyson; 2nd Baron Tennyson (1852–1928) | 9 January 1903 | 21 January 1904 | 1 year, 12 days | Edward VII (1901–1910) | Alfred Deakin (1903–1904) | |
| 3 | | Henry Northcote; 1st Baron Northcote (1846–1911) | 21 January 1904 | 9 September 1908 | 4 years, 232 days | Edward VII (1901–1910) | Alfred Deakin (1903–1904) | |
| 3 | | Henry Northcote; 1st Baron Northcote (1846–1911) | 21 January 1904 | 9 September 1908 | 4 years, 232 days | Edward VII (1901–1910) | Chris Watson (1904) | |
| 3 | | Henry Northcote; 1st Baron Northcote (1846–1911) | 21 January 1904 | 9 September 1908 | 4 years, 232 days | Edward VII (1901–1910) | George Reid (1904–1905) | |
| 3 | | Henry Northcote; 1st Baron Northcote (1846–1911) | 21 January 1904 | 9 September 1908 | 4 years, 232 days | Edward VII (1901–1910) | Alfred Deakin (1905–1908) | |
| 4 | | William Ward; 2nd Earl of Dudley (1867–1932) | 9 September 1908 | 31 July 1911 | 2 years, 325 days | Edward VII (1901–1910) | Alfred Deakin (1905–1908) | |
| 4 | | William Ward; 2nd Earl of Dudley (1867–1932) | 9 September 1908 | 31 July 1911 | 2 years, 325 days | Edward VII (1901–1910) | Andrew Fisher (1908–1909) | |
| 4 | | William Ward; 2nd Earl of Dudley (1867–1932) | 9 September 1908 | 31 July 1911 | 2 years, 325 days | Edward VII (1901–1910) | Alfred Deakin (1909–1910) | |
| 4 | | William Ward; 2nd Earl of Dudley (1867–1932) | 9 September 1908 | 31 July 1911 | 2 years, 325 days | Edward VII (1901–1910) | Andrew Fisher (1910–1913) | |
| 4 | | William Ward; 2nd Earl of Dudley (1867–1932) | 9 September 1908 | 31 July 1911 | 2 years, 325 days | George V (1910–1936) | Andrew Fisher (1910–1913) | |
| 5 | | Thomas Denman; 3rd Baron Denman (1874–1954) | 31 July 1911 | 18 May 1914 | 2 years, 291 days | George V (1910–1936) | Andrew Fisher (1910–1913) | |
| 5 | | Thomas Denman; 3rd Baron Denman (1874–1954) | 31 July 1911 | 18 May 1914 | 2 years, 291 days | George V (1910–1936) | Joseph Cook (1913–1914) | |
| 6 | | Sir Ronald Munro Ferguson (1860–1934) | 18 May 1914 | 6 October 1920 | 6 years, 141 days | George V (1910–1936) | Joseph Cook (1913–1914) | |
| 6 | | Sir Ronald Munro Ferguson (1860–1934) | 18 May 1914 | 6 October 1920 | 6 years, 141 days | George V (1910–1936) | Andrew Fisher (1914–1915) | |
| 6 | | Sir Ronald Munro Ferguson (1860–1934) | 18 May 1914 | 6 October 1920 | 6 years, 141 days | George V (1910–1936) | Billy Hughes (1915–1923) | |
| 7 | | Henry Forster; 1st Baron Forster (1866–1936) | 6 October 1920 | 8 October 1925 | 5 years, 2 days | George V (1910–1936) | Billy Hughes (1915–1923) | |
| 7 | | Henry Forster; 1st Baron Forster (1866–1936) | 6 October 1920 | 8 October 1925 | 5 years, 2 days | George V (1910–1936) | Stanley Bruce (1923–1929) | |
| 8 | | John Baird; 1st Baron Stonehaven (1874–1941) | 8 October 1925 | 2 October 1930 (Note: Stonehaven left for England on 2 October 1930. Arthur Somers-Cocks, 6th Baron Somers, the Governor of Victoria, was appointed Administrator of the Government until Sir Isaac Isaacs took over the governor-generalship on 21 January 1931.) | 4 years, 359 days | George V (1910–1936) | Stanley Bruce (1923–1929) | |
| 8 | | John Baird; 1st Baron Stonehaven (1874–1941) | 8 October 1925 | 2 October 1930 | 4 years, 359 days | George V (1910–1936) | James Scullin (1929–1932) | |
| 9 | | Sir Isaac Isaacs (1855–1948) | 21 January 1931 | 23 January 1936 | 5 years, 2 days | George V (1910–1936) | James Scullin (1929–1932) | |
| 9 | | Sir Isaac Isaacs (1855–1948) | 21 January 1931 | 23 January 1936 | 5 years, 2 days | George V (1910–1936) | Joseph Lyons (1932–1939) | |
| 9 | | Sir Isaac Isaacs (1855–1948) | 21 January 1931 | 23 January 1936 | 5 years, 2 days | Edward VIII (1936) | Joseph Lyons (1932–1939) | |
| 10 | | Brigadier-General; Alexander Hore-Ruthven; 1st Baron Gowrie (1872–1955) | 23 January 1936 | 30 January 1945 | 9 years, 7 days | Edward VIII (1936) | Joseph Lyons (1932–1939) | |
| 10 | | Brigadier-General; Alexander Hore-Ruthven; 1st Baron Gowrie (1872–1955) | 23 January 1936 | 30 January 1945 | 9 years, 7 days | George VI (1936–1952) | Joseph Lyons (1932–1939) | |
| 10 | | Brigadier-General; Alexander Hore-Ruthven; 1st Baron Gowrie (1872–1955) | 23 January 1936 | 30 January 1945 | 9 years, 7 days | George VI (1936–1952) | Earle Page (1939) | |
| 10 | | Brigadier-General; Alexander Hore-Ruthven; 1st Baron Gowrie (1872–1955) | 23 January 1936 | 30 January 1945 | 9 years, 7 days | George VI (1936–1952) | Robert Menzies (1939–1941) | |
| 10 | | Brigadier-General; Alexander Hore-Ruthven; 1st Baron Gowrie (1872–1955) | 23 January 1936 | 30 January 1945 | 9 years, 7 days | George VI (1936–1952) | Arthur Fadden (1941) | |
| 10 | | Brigadier-General; Alexander Hore-Ruthven; 1st Baron Gowrie (1872–1955) | 23 January 1936 | 30 January 1945 | 9 years, 7 days | George VI (1936–1952) | John Curtin (1941–1945) | |
| 11 | | Prince Henry; Duke of Gloucester (1900–1974) | 30 January 1945 | 11 March 1947 | 2 years, 40 days | George VI (1936–1952) | John Curtin (1941–1945) | |
| 11 | | Prince Henry; Duke of Gloucester (1900–1974) | 30 January 1945 | 11 March 1947 | 2 years, 40 days | George VI (1936–1952) | Frank Forde (1945) | |
| 11 | | Prince Henry; Duke of Gloucester (1900–1974) | 30 January 1945 | 11 March 1947 | 2 years, 40 days | George VI (1936–1952) | Ben Chifley (1945–1949) | |
| 12 | | Sir William McKell (1891–1985) | 11 March 1947 | 8 May 1953 | 6 years, 58 days | George VI (1936–1952) | Ben Chifley (1945–1949) | |
| 12 | | Sir William McKell (1891–1985) | 11 March 1947 | 8 May 1953 | 6 years, 58 days | George VI (1936–1952) | Robert Menzies (1949–1966) | |
| 12 | | Sir William McKell (1891–1985) | 11 March 1947 | 8 May 1953 | 6 years, 58 days | Elizabeth II (1952–2022) | Robert Menzies (1949–1966) | |
| 13 | | Field Marshal; Sir William Slim (1891–1970) | 8 May 1953 | 2 February 1960 | 6 years, 270 days | Elizabeth II (1952–2022) | Robert Menzies (1949–1966) | |
| 14 | | William Morrison; 1st Viscount Dunrossil (1893–1961) | 2 February 1960 | 3 February 1961 (Note: Dunrossil died in office on 3 February 1961. Sir Dallas Brooks, the governor of Victoria, was appointed Administrator of the Government until Lord De L'Isle took over the governor-generalship on 3 August 1961.) | 1 year, 1 day | Elizabeth II (1952–2022) | Robert Menzies (1949–1966) | |
| 15 | | William Sidney; 1st Viscount De L'Isle (1909–1991) | 3 August 1961 | 7 May 1965 | 3 years, 277 days | Elizabeth II (1952–2022) | Robert Menzies (1949–1966) | |
| 16 | | Richard Casey; Baron Casey (1890–1976) | 7 May 1965 | 30 April 1969 | 3 years, 358 days | Elizabeth II (1952–2022) | Robert Menzies (1949–1966) | |
| 16 | | Richard Casey; Baron Casey (1890–1976) | 7 May 1965 | 30 April 1969 | 3 years, 358 days | Elizabeth II (1952–2022) | Harold Holt (1966–1967) | |
| 16 | | Richard Casey; Baron Casey (1890–1976) | 7 May 1965 | 30 April 1969 | 3 years, 358 days | Elizabeth II (1952–2022) | John McEwen (1967–1968) | |
| 16 | | Richard Casey; Baron Casey (1890–1976) | 7 May 1965 | 30 April 1969 | 3 years, 358 days | Elizabeth II (1952–2022) | John Gorton (1968–1971) | |
| 17 | | Sir Paul Hasluck (1905–1993) | 30 April 1969 | 11 July 1974 | 5 years, 72 days | Elizabeth II (1952–2022) | John Gorton (1968–1971) | |
| 17 | | Sir Paul Hasluck (1905–1993) | 30 April 1969 | 11 July 1974 | 5 years, 72 days | Elizabeth II (1952–2022) | William McMahon (1971–1972) | |
| 17 | | Sir Paul Hasluck (1905–1993) | 30 April 1969 | 11 July 1974 | 5 years, 72 days | Elizabeth II (1952–2022) | Gough Whitlam (1972–1975) | |
| 18 | | Sir John Kerr (1914–1991) | 11 July 1974 | 8 December 1977 | 3 years, 150 days | Elizabeth II (1952–2022) | Gough Whitlam (1972–1975) | |
| 18 | | Sir John Kerr (1914–1991) | 11 July 1974 | 8 December 1977 | 3 years, 150 days | Elizabeth II (1952–2022) | Malcolm Fraser (1975–1983) | |
| 19 | | Sir Zelman Cowen (1919–2011) | 8 December 1977 | 29 July 1982 | 4 years, 233 days | Elizabeth II (1952–2022) | Malcolm Fraser (1975–1983) | |
| 20 | | Sir Ninian Stephen (1923–2017) | 29 July 1982 | 16 February 1989 | 6 years, 202 days | Elizabeth II (1952–2022) | Malcolm Fraser (1975–1983) | |
| 20 | | Sir Ninian Stephen (1923–2017) | 29 July 1982 | 16 February 1989 | 6 years, 202 days | Elizabeth II (1952–2022) | Bob Hawke (1983–1991) | |
| 21 | | Bill Hayden (1933–2023) | 16 February 1989 | 16 February 1996 | 7 years | Elizabeth II (1952–2022) | Bob Hawke (1983–1991) | |
| 21 | | Bill Hayden (1933–2023) | 16 February 1989 | 16 February 1996 | 7 years | Elizabeth II (1952–2022) | Paul Keating (1991–1996) | |
| 22 | | Sir William Deane (born 1931) | 16 February 1996 | 29 June 2001 | 5 years, 133 days | Elizabeth II (1952–2022) | Paul Keating (1991–1996) | |
| 22 | | Sir William Deane (born 1931) | 16 February 1996 | 29 June 2001 | 5 years, 133 days | Elizabeth II (1952–2022) | John Howard (1996–2007) | |
| 23 | | Peter Hollingworth (1935–2026) | 29 June 2001 | 28 May 2003 (Note: Hollingworth resigned on 28 May 2003. Sir Guy Green, the governor of Tasmania, was appointed Administrator of the Government until Michael Jeffery took over the governor-generalship on 11 August 2003.) | 1 year, 333 days | Elizabeth II (1952–2022) | John Howard (1996–2007) | |
| 24 | | Major General; Michael Jeffery (1937–2020) | 11 August 2003 | 5 September 2008 | 5 years, 25 days | Elizabeth II (1952–2022) | John Howard (1996–2007) | |
| 24 | | Major General; Michael Jeffery (1937–2020) | 11 August 2003 | 5 September 2008 | 5 years, 25 days | Elizabeth II (1952–2022) | Kevin Rudd (2007–2010) | |
| 25 | | Dame Quentin Bryce (born 1942) | 5 September 2008 | 28 March 2014 | 5 years, 204 days | Elizabeth II (1952–2022) | Kevin Rudd (2007–2010) | |
| 25 | | Dame Quentin Bryce (born 1942) | 5 September 2008 | 28 March 2014 | 5 years, 204 days | Elizabeth II (1952–2022) | Julia Gillard (2010–2013) | |
| 25 | | Dame Quentin Bryce (born 1942) | 5 September 2008 | 28 March 2014 | 5 years, 204 days | Elizabeth II (1952–2022) | Kevin Rudd (2013) | |
| 25 | | Dame Quentin Bryce (born 1942) | 5 September 2008 | 28 March 2014 | 5 years, 204 days | Elizabeth II (1952–2022) | Tony Abbott (2013–2015) | |
| 26 | | General; Sir Peter Cosgrove (born 1947) | 28 March 2014 | 1 July 2019 | 5 years, 95 days | Elizabeth II (1952–2022) | Tony Abbott (2013–2015) | |
| 26 | | General; Sir Peter Cosgrove (born 1947) | 28 March 2014 | 1 July 2019 | 5 years, 95 days | Elizabeth II (1952–2022) | Malcolm Turnbull (2015–2018) | |
| 26 | | General; Sir Peter Cosgrove (born 1947) | 28 March 2014 | 1 July 2019 | 5 years, 95 days | Elizabeth II (1952–2022) | Scott Morrison (2018–2022) | |
| 27 | | General; David Hurley (born 1953) | 1 July 2019 | 1 July 2024 | 5 years | Elizabeth II (1952–2022) | Scott Morrison (2018–2022) | |
| 27 | | General; David Hurley (born 1953) | 1 July 2019 | 1 July 2024 | 5 years | Elizabeth II (1952–2022) | Anthony Albanese (since 2022) | |
| 27 | | General; David Hurley (born 1953) | 1 July 2019 | 1 July 2024 | 5 years | Charles III (since 2022) | Anthony Albanese (since 2022) | |
| 28 | | Sam Mostyn (born 1965) | 1 July 2024 | Incumbent | 2 years, 44 days | Charles III (since 2022) | Anthony Albanese (since 2022) | |

== Timeline ==
This is a graphical lifespan timeline of the governors-general of Australia. They are listed in order of first assuming office.

The following chart lists governors-general by lifespan (living governors-general on the green line), with the years outside of their governor-generalship in beige.

The following chart shows governors-general by their age (living governors-general in green), with the years of their governor-generalship in blue.

== See also ==
- History of Australia
- Constitutional history of Australia
- Administrators of the Commonwealth of Australia
- Governors of the Australian states
- British Empire
- Governor-general (links to other countries which have governors-general)
