= List of Australian state governors =

Lists of Australian state governors cover the governors of the Australian states. The governors are the viceroys of the Australian monarch. They perform constitutional and ceremonial functions at the state level.

== Lists by state ==
- List of governors of New South Wales
- List of governors of Queensland
- List of governors of South Australia
- List of governors of Tasmania
- List of governors of Victoria
- List of governors of Western Australia
