= List of female state governors in Australia =

This is a list of women who served as governors of states and territories of Australia.

As of January 2020, ten women have served or are serving as the governor of an Australian state. The governors are the representatives of Australia's monarch in each of Australia's six states. The governors are the nominal chief executives of the states, performing the same constitutional and ceremonial functions at the state level as does the Governor-General of Australia at the national or federal level. The state governors are not subject to the constitutional authority of the governor-general, but are directly responsible to the monarch.

Two women have served as Administrator of the Northern Territory, an official appointed by the Governor-General of Australia to represent the government of the Commonwealth in the Northern Territory who performs functions similar to those of a state governor. However, the Administrator is not the direct representative of the Monarch in the Territory as territories are not sovereign in the same way as states.

The first female governor in Australia was Dame Roma Mitchell in South Australia in 1991. To date, Australia has had two female Governor-general, Dame Quentin Bryce (2008-2014), who previously served as Governor of Queensland, and Sam Mostyn, in office since July 2024.

Since 1 February 2023, all state governors excluding Western Australia (5 in total) are female, which is unprecedented in Australian history.

== List of female state governors ==
Incumbent

Portrait	Name	State	Term start	Term end	Duration	Reference
	The Honourable Dame Roma Mitchell AC, DBE, CVO, QC	31st Governor of South Australia	6 February 1991	21 July 1996	5 years, 166 days	
	The Honourable Leneen Forde AC	22nd Governor of Queensland	29 July 1992	29 July 1997	5 years, 0 days	
	Professor The Honourable Dame Marie Bashir AD, CVO	37th Governor of New South Wales	1 March 2001	1 October 2014	13 years, 214 days	
	The Honourable Marjorie Jackson-Nelson AC, CVO, MBE	33rd Governor of South Australia	3 November 2001	31 July 2007	5 years, 270 days	
	The Honourable Dame Quentin Bryce AD, CVO	24th Governor of Queensland	29 July 2003	29 July 2008	5 years, 0 days	
	The Honourable Penelope Wensley AC	25th Governor of Queensland	29 July 2008	29 July 2014	6 years, 0 days	
	The Honourable Sally Thomas AC	18th Administrator of the Northern Territory	1 October 2011	10 November 2014	3 years, 40 days	
	The Honourable Kerry Sanderson AC CVO	32nd Governor of Western Australia	20 October 2014	1 May 2018	3 years, 193 days	
	Professor The Honourable Kate Warner AC	29th Governor of Tasmania	10 December 2014	9 June 2021	6 years, 181 days	
	Her Excellency The Honourable Linda Dessau AC	29th Governor of Victoria	1 July 2015	30 June 2023	7 years, 364 days	
	Her Honour The Honourable Vicki O'Halloran AO	20th Administrator of the Northern Territory	1 October 2017	30 January 2023	5 years, 121 days	
	Her Excellency The Honourable Margaret Beazley AC, QC	39th Governor of New South Wales	2 May 2019	Incumbent	7 years, 84 days	
	Her Excellency The Honourable Barbara Baker AC	30th Governor of Tasmania	16 June 2021	Incumbent	5 years, 39 days	
	Her Excellency The Honourable Frances Adamson AC	36th Governor of South Australia	7 October 2021	Incumbent	4 years, 291 days	
	Her Excellency The Honourable Jeannette Young PSM	27th Governor of Queensland	1 November 2021	Incumbent	4 years, 266 days	
	Her Excellency The Honourable Margaret Gardner	30th Governor of Victoria	9 August 2023	Incumbent	2 years, 350 days	

== See also ==
- Women and government in Australia
