= Governors of the Australian states =

Each Australian state has a governor to represent Australia's monarch within it. The governors are the nominal chief executives of the states, performing the same constitutional and ceremonial functions at the state level as does the governor-general of Australia at the national or federal level. In practice, with notable exceptions the governors are generally required by convention to act on the advice of the state premiers or the other members of a state's cabinet.

Australia's state governors are not subject to the constitutional authority of the governor-general, but are direct representatives of the monarch. This means, for example, that the governor-general may not issue pardons or commutations of sentence for any state offences, or issue any state honours.

== Origins ==
The office of governor ("governor in chief" was an early title) is the oldest constitutional office in Australia. The title was first used with the governor of New South Wales, and dates back to 1788 to the day on which the area (which is now the city of Sydney) became the first British settlement in Australia. Each of the subsequent five states in Australia was also founded as a British colony, and a governor was appointed by the British government to exercise executive authority over the colony. The first governors of the colonies, and their dates of appointment, are as follows:

- New South Wales: Captain Arthur Phillip (7 February 1788)
- Western Australia: Captain James Stirling (6 February 1832)
- South Australia: Captain John Hindmarsh (28 December 1836)
- Tasmania: Sir Henry Fox Young (8 January 1855)
- Victoria: Sir Charles Hotham (22 May 1855)
- Queensland: Sir George Bowen (10 December 1859)

Only in New South Wales and South Australia was the date of the appointment of the first governor the actual date of the colony's foundation. The settlement which became Queensland was founded in 1824, but was not separated from New South Wales until 1859. In Tasmania, Victoria and Western Australia executive authority was exercised by a lieutenant-governor for some years before the first governor was appointed; Tasmania was founded in 1804, Western Australia in 1828 and Victoria in 1835.

New South Wales and Tasmania (which was known as Van Diemen's Land until 1855) were founded as penal colonies, and their governors (lieutenant-governors in Tasmania) exercised more or less absolute authority. Tasmania in particular was run as a virtual prison camp in its early years. The governors were also commanders-in-chief, and the troops under their command were the real basis of their authority.

From the 1820s, however, the increasing number of free settlers in the colonies led to a process of constitutional reform which gradually reduced the powers of the governors. New South Wales was given its first legislative body, the New South Wales Legislative Council, in 1825. Victoria, South Australia and Western Australia, which were not founded as penal settlements, moved rapidly towards constitutional government after their establishment.

== Federation ==
When the six colonies federated to form the Commonwealth of Australia in 1901, there were some suggestions that the position of state governor should be abolished or that its appointment be made by the governor-general as is done in Canada. However, the states insisted on retaining their separate links to the Crown, a concept that can be compared to the American system of separate sovereignty for state and federal governments. The states were concerned that Commonwealth-appointed governors might be used to do the federal government's bidding, up to and including use of a governor's reserve powers to dismiss a recalcitrant state government. To ensure that state governments would be free from such extra-constitutional intervention or coercion, state governors continued to be appointed by the monarch on the advice of the colonial secretary in London, usually after an informal consultation with the state government.

The post of governor was again called into question during the Depression of the 1930s, when the cost of maintaining six vice-regal establishments (as well as a governor-general in Canberra) drew criticism from the labour movement and others. During this period some states (notably Western Australia) left the position unfilled as an economy measure for some years, and the vice-regal functions were filled by the state chief justices with the title of administrator. But no state attempted to abolish the post of governor, and this could not have been done at this time without the consent of the Crown (acting on the advice of the British government).

The political role of the governor became a matter of controversy in 1932 when the governor of New South Wales, Sir Philip Game, used his reserve power to dismiss the premier, Jack Lang, on the grounds that Lang was acting illegally. All governors at this time were British, and most were from the upper classes and political conservatives, and Labor governments always suspected that they had an enemy in Government House. Most governors, however, tried to act impartially, and some were genuinely popular.

From the 1940s the states, particularly those with Labor governments, began to appoint Australians to the post of governor. The first Australian governors of each of the states, and their dates of appointment, were:

- New South Wales: Sir John Northcott (1 August 1946)
- Queensland: Sir John Lavarack (1 October 1946)
- Western Australia: Sir James Mitchell (5 October 1948)
- South Australia: Sir James Harrison (4 December 1968)
- Tasmania: Sir Stanley Burbury (5 December 1973)
- Victoria: Sir Henry Winneke (3 June 1974)

The first colonies were penal settlements and the early colonial governors were military officers who ruled under martial law. Once the governors' role moved from the executive to the ceremonial, most governors were drawn from the ranks of retired officers. Although a few members of the peerage served as governors (the most prominent being Earl Beauchamp in New South Wales), the Australian colonial capitals were small towns and considered not grand enough to attract senior members of the British aristocracy. Even when Australians replaced Britons as governors, most continued to be retired Army, Navy or Air Force officers until the 1970s.

The last non-Australian governor of an Australian state was Rear Admiral Sir Richard Trowbridge, who was governor of Western Australia from 1980 to 1983. Davis McCaughey, born in Northern Ireland, was not an Australian citizen at the time his appointment as governor of Victoria was announced in 1985, but was a long-time resident of Australia and took up citizenship before commencing his term in 1986.

From the 1960s the governors continued to be appointed by the monarch of the United Kingdom, acting on the advice of the British foreign and Commonwealth secretary (who replaced the colonial secretary). While usually acting on the recommendation of the state premier, the role of the British government was more than nominal. In 1975 the British government refused to accept premier Sir Joh Bjelke-Petersen's request that Sir Colin Hannah's term as Queensland governor be extended due to Hannah's impartial public comments on the Whitlam government. It was not until 1986, with the passage of the Australia Acts through the state, Australian and British parliaments, that governors became appointed by the monarch of Australia on the direct advice of the relevant premier.

== The Australia Acts 1986 ==
Although the Commonwealth of Australia became largely sovereign in external and federal affairs over a period beginning with the Imperial Conference of 1923 and the adoption of the Statute of Westminster in 1942, the states remained colonial dependencies of Britain, subject to the authority of the British government and Imperial Parliament. State laws were still invalid if they conflicted with British laws due to the Colonial Laws Validity Act 1865. Additionally, state governors continued to be appointed by the queen of the United Kingdom (not the legally distinct queen of Australia) on the advice of the British foreign secretary. Generally, the premier of each state recommended a prospective governor to the foreign secretary, who almost always acted in accordance with that recommendation. However, in 1976 the foreign secretary refused to advise Queen Elizabeth II to extend the term of Sir Colin Hannah as governor, as recommended by Queensland premier Sir Joh Bjelke-Petersen, on the grounds of the governor's partisan comments on the federal Whitlam government.

In 1978, the Parliament of New South Wales passed the Constitutional Powers (New South Wales) Act, requesting that the Commonwealth Parliament legislate to address the constitutional anomaly of the United Kingdom Government's role in the constitutional affairs of the state. Eventually, identical Australia Acts were passed by the Commonwealth Parliament and the Parliament of the United Kingdom in 1986, thus removing what remaining authority London had over affairs in Canberra. Under section 7 of these Acts, the monarch now receives advice on the appointment and termination of appointments of state governors from the relevant state premier.

== Role of the governors ==
State governor's rank insignia

The role of state governor in modern times is broken down into constitutional, ceremonial and social responsibilities. Regarding constitutional practices, in most cases the governor observes the convention to act on the advice of the state's cabinet (and/or premier). Nevertheless, the state governors, like the governor-general, retain the full panoply of the reserve powers of the Crown. This has been shown on two recent occasions.

In 1987 the governor of Queensland, Sir Walter Campbell, refused to accept the advice of the National Party premier, Joh Bjelke-Petersen, to dismiss five of his ministers and call fresh elections. Campbell believed that Bjelke-Petersen had lost the confidence of his own party and was behaving irrationally. He was also reluctant to call an election for a legislature that was barely a year old, and felt that the situation was a political rather than a constitutional matter. Bjelke-Petersen subsequently resigned.

In 1989 the governor of Tasmania, Sir Phillip Bennett, refused to grant a fresh dissolution to the Liberal premier, Robin Gray, after Gray lost his majority in the recent election. Although no one party had a majority in the new House of Assembly, Bennett had already been assured that the Tasmanian Greens would support a minority Labor government under Michael Field. Bennett thus took the view that Gray no longer had enough support to govern and could not advise him to call a second election. Gray then resigned; Bennett then commissioned Field as premier.

In the event of a governor-general's death, incapacity, removal, resignation or absence overseas, each of the state governors has a dormant commission to become the administrator of the Commonwealth, that is, to take on the governor-general's duties until he returns from overseas or a new appointment is made. The convention is that the longest-serving state governor who is available is the one to assume the administration of the government of the Commonwealth. When Peter Hollingworth resigned in May 2003, Sir Guy Green, Governor of Tasmania, took on that role, serving until Major-General Michael Jeffery took office in August 2003.

== Lieutenant-governors and administrators ==
A lieutenant-governor takes on the responsibilities of a governor when that post is vacant or when the governor is out of the state or unable to act. In some states the lieutenant governor is also the chief justice. An administrator takes on those duties if both the governor and lieutenant-governor are not able to act for the above reasons.

== Backgrounds of governors ==
In 1976, South Australia appointed Sir Douglas Nicholls as the first (and, to date, the only) Aboriginal governor of an Australian state. Governors of non-Anglo-Australian background have been appointed in recent years. These include Ken Michael (Greek; Western Australia), Sir James Gobbo (Italian; Victoria), David de Kretser (Sri Lankan/Ceylonese; Victoria), Dame Marie Bashir (Lebanese; New South Wales), Alex Chernov (Russian: Victoria), and Hieu Van Le (Vietnamese; South Australia). Sir Matthew Nathan, Governor of Queensland from 1920 to 1925, was Australia's only Jewish governor until the appointment of Linda Dessau as Governor of Victoria in 2015.

South Australia was also the first state to appoint a woman as governor, when Dame Roma Mitchell took office in 1991. With the appointment of Jeannette Young on 1 November 2021, Queensland currently has four female governors, more than any other state. Queensland is also the first state to have had two female governors in succession (Penelope Wensley succeeded Quentin Bryce), followed by Tasmania (Kate Warner in 2014 and Barbara Baker in 2021) and then Victoria in 2023. South Australia now has three female governors following the appointment of Frances Adamson who was sworn in on 7 October 2021. With the appointment of Margaret Gardner who was sworn in on 9 August 2023; New South Wales, Tasmania and Victoria will have had two each whilst Western Australia has only one so far. The Northern Territory, the only mainland territory to have an administrator, has had two female administrators (Sally Thomas and Vicki O'Halloran). Since 2021, every state governor apart from that of Western Australia has been a woman.

John Landy, a former governor of Victoria, and Marjorie Jackson-Nelson, a former governor of South Australia, are former Australian Olympic medallists.

== Contemporary changes and prospects ==
The Northern Territory received self-government on 1 July 1978 under its own administrator appointed by the governor-general. The Commonwealth prime minister, not the Chief Minister of the Northern Territory, advises the governor-general on the appointment of the administrator.

In the lead up to the 1999 republican referendum, state governments were required to consider state links to the Crown and thus the validity of appointing the governor through the monarch. At a constitutional convention in Gladstone, Queensland, the states indicated that, if the referendum was successful, governors should be appointed by the parliament, although agreement on the exact method of appointment was not reached. As the referendum failed, no state altered the appointment method.

== Current state and territory governors ==
=== Current state governors ===
Name	Portrait	Title	Term
Margaret Beazley		Governor of New South Wales	2 May 2019 (7 years, 183 days)
Frances Adamson		Governor of South Australia	7 October 2021 (5 years, 25 days)
Chris Dawson		Governor of Western Australia	15 July 2022 (4 years, 109 days)
Margaret Gardner		(Victoria (state)) Governor of Victoria	9 August 2023 (3 years, 84 days)
Caroline Wells		Governor of Tasmania	17 June 2026 (137 days)
Thomas Bradley		Governor of Queensland	1 November 2026 (0 days)

=== Current administrators of the territories ===
Name	Portrait	Region	Term	Title
Farzian Zainal		Christmas Island; Cocos (Keeling) Islands	19 June 2023 (3 years, 135 days)	Administrator of Australian Indian Ocean Territories
David Connolly		Northern Territory	27 February 2026 (247 days)	Administrator of the Northern Territory
Fiona McKergow		Norfolk Island	1 June 2026 (153 days)	Administrator of Norfolk Island

== See also ==
- Governor-General of Australia
- Lieutenant governor (Canada)
