= Dormant commission =

Commission that could be activated if a particular event happens

A dormant commission is a commission in a Commonwealth realm that lies dormant or sleeping until a particular event triggers it. A commission in this case means an appointment to a particular government office, which the reigning monarch of the nation typically makes, directed to a particular person, giving that person the ability and duty to exercise the powers of that office—or, in other words, 'commissioning' them into a role or an office. Dormant commissions may be structured such that they become effective not at issuance, but rather as from the moment of the occurrence of a stated trigger event (e.g. a state's Governor dies). In this way, vacancies in important offices can be quickly (even prospectively) corrected, and continuity of government can be secured, by a combination of legal contingency planning, backstop/replacement officeholders, and seamless continuation of capacity.

== Examples ==
=== Australia ===
In Australia, Section 4 of the Constitution allows the King to appoint an Administrator to carry out the role of Governor-General when there is a vacancy (eg the previous governor-general has resigned, been injured, or their ability to exercise the powers of the office impaired). The Governors of the Australian states, by convention, are given dormant commissions to act as Administrator of the Commonwealth in the absence of a Governor-General. By convention, the longest-serving state governor exercises the dormant commission, allowing an assumption of office to commence immediately whenever a vacancy occurs and for so long as it exists. For example, when Peter Hollingworth stood aside as Governor-General in May 2003, Tasmanian Governor Sir Guy Green was appointed Administrator until Hollingworth's permanent replacement (Major-General Michael Jeffery) was appointed and sworn in several months later. The Australian government can advise the monarch to revoke any Governor's dormant commission—so long as that commission is in right of the Commonwealth, for example as Administrator of the Commonwealth. For example, the dormant commission of Sir Colin Hannah, the then Governor of Queensland, was revoked in 1975 after he made party-political statements that the federal government of the time considered inconsistent with potential future service as Administrator of the Commonwealth. Proposed constitutional amendments to enact a republic (voted down in 1999) made "the longest-serving State Governor available" an Acting President in the event of vacancy or incapacitation.

=== Canada ===
In Canada, the Chief Justice has a dormant commission to act as Administrator of the Government of Canada in the absence of the Governor General of Canada.

=== Fiji ===
In Fiji under the 2013 Constitution of Fiji, the Chief Justice of Fiji has a dormant commission to act as President of Fiji when it is vacant or when the President is either absent or ill. His powers include those that were held by the Vice-President of Fiji from 1990 to 2013, when the position of Vice-President was abolished.

=== Ireland ===
Under the Constitution of Ireland, the Cathaoirleach (chairperson of the Seanad Éireann), Ceann Comhairle (chairperson of the Dáil Éireann) and Chief Justice of Ireland hold a dormant commission to act as President of Ireland when the office is vacant or temporarily absent.

=== New Zealand ===
In New Zealand, all judges hold a dormant commission to act as Administrator of the Government in the absence of the Governor-General of New Zealand, in order of seniority. The Chief Justice of New Zealand is first in line to use this commission, and does so on a regular basis when the Governor-General is overseas or otherwise occupied. If she was unavailable, it would pass to the Supreme Court Justice with the highest seniority, then Court of Appeal, High Court, and finally the longest-serving District Court Judge.

=== South Africa ===
In the Union of South Africa, a dormant commission was held by the Chief Justice of South Africa when the position of Governor-General of South Africa was vacant. This was the case between 1943 and 1945, when Nicolaas Jacobus de Wet was installed, and in 1959 and 1961, when L. C. Steyn was installed.

In South Africa between 1961 and 1984, the South African Constitution of 1961 gave a dormant commission for the President of the Senate of South Africa to be invoked as Acting State President of South Africa when there was a vacancy in the office of State President; which was often the case between the year 1967 and 1979.

=== United Kingdom ===
Historically, a dormant commission was often given in relation to a military command. During the Crimean War, for example, Sir George Cathcart held a dormant commission to take command of the British Army in Crimea if Lord Raglan should be killed or disabled.

In the British Virgin Islands, the Deputy Governor of the British Virgin Islands has a dormant commission to act as Governor of the British Virgin Islands when there is either a vacancy or when the Governor is either ill or temporarily absent from the British Virgin Islands. Other British Overseas Territories also have Deputy Governors, who also hold dormant commissions as well for the same reasons.
