= Peter Underwood =

Australian jurist and Governor of Tasmania (1937–2014)

The Honourable Peter Underwood AC
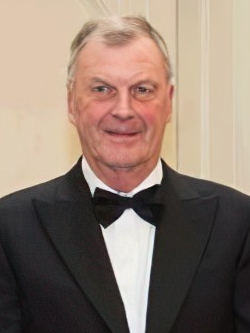
- Underwood in 2012

27th Governor of Tasmania
- In office 2 April 2008 – 7 July 2014
- Monarch: Elizabeth II
- Premier: Paul Lennon (2008); David Bartlett (2008–11); Lara Giddings (2011–14); Will Hodgman (2014)
- Preceded by: William Cox
- Succeeded by: Kate Warner

Personal details
- Born: Peter George Underwood; 10 October 1937 United Kingdom
- Died: 7 July 2014 (aged 76) Hobart, Tasmania
- Citizenship: Australian
- Spouse: Frances Underwood
- Education: University of Tasmania
- Awards: Companion of the Order of Australia

Military service
- Allegiance: Australia
- Branch/service: Royal Australian Navy
- Rank: Sub-Lieutenant

Peter George Underwood, AC (10 October 1937 – 7 July 2014) was an Australian jurist and the Governor of Tasmania from 2008 until his death in 2014. He was the Chief Justice of Tasmania from 2004 to 2008, having been a judge of the Supreme Court of Tasmania from 1984.

== Early life and legal career ==
Underwood was born on 10 October 1937 in the United Kingdom, and emigrated to Australia in 1950. He served in the Royal Australian Navy first as a National Serviceman and then in the Reserve as a sub-lieutenant. He graduated from the University of Tasmania in 1960, and practised law in Hobart for the law firm Murdoch, Clarke, Cosgrove and Drake. He was a distinguished trial advocate for over twenty years. He was appointed a Judge of the Supreme Court in August 1984.

Underwood managed and taught postgraduate courses in advocacy and Supreme Court practice through the University of Tasmania's Centre for Legal Practice, and continued to teach advocacy in all states of Australia with the Advocacy Institute of Australia. He also taught for The College of Law (UK) in Hong Kong and London.

Underwood had a special interest in the reform of civil procedure. He pioneered case management in Tasmania in 1989 and was instrumental in the development and use of technology as an aid to judicial work.

Underwood also served as chairman of the executive committee of the board of governors of the Friends' School from 1989 to 1994, and was chairman of the Tasmanian Symphony Orchestra Board from 1997 to 2006.

In 2001, Underwood was awarded an honorary Doctor of Laws degree in recognition of his services to legal education, the arts and the administration of justice. In June 2002 Underwood was made an Officer of the Order of Australia.

Underwood was appointed to the office of Chief Justice of Tasmania on 2 December 2004. He was a deputy president of the Australian Defence Force Disciplinary Appeal Tribunal and was the President of the Australian Institute of Judicial Administration from 2002 to September 2004.

== Governor of Tasmania ==
On 3 March 2008, Premier Paul Lennon announced the appointment of Underwood as the next Governor of Tasmania, and he was sworn in on 2 April 2008. On 8 June 2009, he was made a Companion of the Order of Australia.

When the 2010 state election resulted in a hung parliament with both the Liberals and Labor on 10 seats, Lennon's successor as premier, David Bartlett, advised Underwood to commission Opposition Leader Will Hodgman as premier, as the Liberals had won a narrow plurality of the popular vote. Before the election, Bartlett had contended that whoever won the most votes should form government. However, after talks with both Bartlett and Hodgman, Underwood recommissioned Bartlett. In a detailed statement announcing his decision, Underwood noted that Hodgman had not approached the Greens for support before the writs were returned, and Bartlett had not promised a minimum period of support to a Hodgman minority government. He also concluded that Bartlett's promise to give up power was not relevant, since the decision to invite a person to form government was solely within the governor's prerogative. Since Bartlett still held his commission as premier, Underwood was of the view that Bartlett was obliged to test the support for his government on the floor of the House of Assembly. This was per longstanding Westminster convention that the incumbent premier/prime minister has the first opportunity to form a government if no party has a majority.

On 24 September 2012, Underwood's term was extended to 1 April 2016.

=== Anzac Day speech ===
On 25 April 2014, speaking in his capacity as governor at an Anzac Day service at the Hobart Cenotaph, Underwood warned against "glorifying war with descriptions of the mythical tall, lean, bronzed and laconic ANZAC." He called for the 2014 centenary of the First World War to be declared "the Year of Peace" and for Australia to establish "a centre for the study of peace, conflict and war". Alternatively, he said, "some of the millions of dollars that will be spent on the 'Anzac Festival'" should be diverted to "support for the University of Sydney's Centre for Peace and Conflict Studies."

The speech led to scathing reactions from the national media, with columnist Andrew Bolt declaring in an editorial he was "not fit to be Governor of Tasmania". A week earlier, the out-going president of RSL Tasmania had hailed the speech as "the best he had heard in his life" however his replacement told the media RSL Tasmania was considering rescinding Underwood's invitation to speak during the centenary Anzac day ceremonies in 2015. He died before they took any such action.

== Death ==
Underwood died in office on 7 July 2014. He underwent an operation in early June to remove a kidney tumour, and had returned to work in late June, but suffered a setback a day later.

Legal offices
Preceded by William Cox	Chief Justice of Tasmania; 2004–2008	Succeeded by Ewan Crawford
Government offices
Preceded by William Cox	Governor of Tasmania; 2008–2014	Succeeded by Kate Warner
