= William Cox (governor) =

Australian judge (born 1936)

The Honourable William Cox AC, RFD, ED, KC

26th Governor of Tasmania
- In office 15 December 2004 – 2 April 2008
- Monarch: Elizabeth II
- Premier: Paul Lennon
- Preceded by: Richard Butler
- Succeeded by: Peter Underwood

Personal details
- Born: 1 April 1936 (age 90) Hobart, Tasmania
- Spouse: Jocelyn Cox
- Civilian awards: Companion of the Order of Australia

Military service
- Allegiance: Australia
- Branch/service: Australian Army Reserve
- Unit: Royal Tasmania Regiment
- Battles/wars: Vietnam War
- Military awards: Reserve Force Decoration; Efficiency Decoration

William John Ellis Cox, AC, RFD, ED, KC (born 1 April 1936) is an Australian judge who was Governor of Tasmania from 15 December 2004 to 2 April 2008, prior to which he was the state's Chief Justice and Lieutenant Governor.

== Early life ==
Born in Hobart to William Ellis Cox (d. 1970) and Alice Mary Mulcahy Cox (d. 1983), William John Ellis Cox was educated at St. Virgil's College, Hobart, Xavier College, Melbourne and the University of Tasmania. He graduated from the University of Tasmania with a Bachelor of Arts and a Bachelor of Laws in 1960 and was admitted to the Bar in the Supreme Court of Tasmania in March 1960. He was appointed a magistrate in 1976, and became a Queen's Counsel in 1978, during his term as the State's Crown Advocate (equivalent to Director of Public Prosecutions).

== Career ==
Cox was appointed to the Supreme Court of Tasmania in 1982, and was the state's Chief Justice from 1995 until 2004. He was appointed Lieutenant-Governor of Tasmania in 1996. In 1999, Cox was made a Companion of the Order of Australia (AC). He already held the Reserve Force Decoration (RFD) and the Army's Efficiency Decoration (ED) for service in the Royal Tasmania Regiment, which included a brief deployment to Vietnam.

Cox's most high-profile court case was that of Martin Bryant, who shot dead 35 people at Port Arthur on 28 April 1996 and was brought before Cox for his trial six months later. Bryant admitted all 35 murders on 8 November and Cox sentenced him to life imprisonment fourteen days later, recommending that Bryant should stay in prison until he dies.

== Governor of Tasmania ==
In August 2004, Cox was appointed to administer the Government of Tasmania upon the resignation of Richard Butler and, in November the Premier, Paul Lennon, announced that he had advised the Queen to appoint Cox as Governor of Tasmania. Cox is only the second Tasmanian-born governor in the state's history. The first was Sir Guy Green.

During his term, Cox was the Honorary Colonel of the Royal Tasmania Regiment and Honorary Air Commodore of the RAAF No. 29 (City of Hobart) Squadron.

Cox was succeeded as Governor on 2 April 2008 by Peter Underwood, Chief Justice of Tasmania.

In November 2015, Cox was appointed to conduct the first five yearly review into the Tasmanian Integrity Commission.

== Family ==
Cox and his wife Jocelyn have three children,Madeline Cox, William Cox (Ellis), Thomas Cox .

Government offices
Preceded by Richard Butler	Governor of Tasmania; 2004–2008	Succeeded by Peter Underwood
Legal offices
Preceded by Guy Green	Chief Justice of Tasmania; 1995–2004	Succeeded by Peter Underwood
