= Richard Butler (diplomat) =

Australian diplomat (born 1942)

Richard Butler AC

25th Governor of Tasmania
- In office 3 October 2003 – 9 August 2004
- Monarch: Elizabeth II
- Lieutenant: William Cox
- Preceded by: Sir Guy Green
- Succeeded by: William Cox

Personal details
- Born: 13 May 1942 (age 84) Coolah, New South Wales, Australia
- Spouses: Susan Ryan (m. 1963–1972) Barbara Evans (before 2003) Dr Jennifer Grey (m. 2003)
- Education: University of Sydney; Australian National University
- Occupation: Government official

Richard William Butler, AC (born 13 May 1942) is a retired Australian public servant, United Nations weapons inspector, and a former Governor of Tasmania.

== Early life and career ==
Butler was born in Coolah in rural New South Wales. He grew up in Sydney and was educated at Randwick Boys High School, the University of Sydney and the Australian National University, Canberra. He married Susan Ryan in 1963 and they had a son and a daughter; they divorced in 1972.

Butler joined the Australian Department of External Affairs in 1965, and served in a number of postings until 1975, when he resigned to become Principal Private Secretary to the Leader of the Opposition, Gough Whitlam, who had recently been dismissed as prime minister.

In 1983 the next Australian Labor Party Prime Minister, Bob Hawke, appointed him as Australia's Permanent Representative on Disarmament to the United Nations in Geneva. He was next appointed Australian Ambassador to Thailand, and played a major part in the Cambodian peace settlement, working closely with then Foreign Minister Gareth Evans. He was Australian Ambassador to the United Nations from 1992 to 1997. His term was ended by the new Foreign Minister Alexander Downer, after Butler's intensive lobbying had failed to win Australia a seat on the Security Council in 1996. In a 2000 memoir The Greatest Threat, Butler acknowledged that his "high-energy, high-visibility activities ... had served as a distraction and clearly alienated some nations whose votes we might otherwise have won".

Butler is currently a Global Diplomat in Residence and Clinical Professor at the Center for Global Affairs at the New York University School of Continuing and Professional Studies; and is also a professor at the School of International Affairs at Penn State University in State College.

== Butler at UNSCOM ==
In 1997 Butler was appointed Chairman of the United Nations Special Commission (UNSCOM), the UN weapons inspection organisation in Iraq, in succession to Rolf Ekéus. In this role he antagonised both the Iraqi regime and the United States, and was frequently described as arrogant and aggressive. UN Secretary-General Kofi Annan rebuked him for using "undiplomatic" language about then Iraqi ruler Saddam Hussein.

While at UNSCOM Butler frequently argued that Saddam had undisclosed weapons of mass destruction. In a 1999 speech he said:

... following Iraq's expulsion from Kuwait, it became clear that the Saddam Hussein government had created a range and quality of weapons of mass destruction that was truly alarming. Iraq had also acquired a very considerable long-range missile force to deliver those weapons. There was also concern about Iraq's nuclear weapons program, which through the International Atomic Energy Agency, we now know was advanced. It was for these reasons that the Security Council imposed very heavy, very strict requirements upon Iraq for the destruction, removal or rendering harmless of those weapons, and all of that to be done under international supervision.

He also accused Iraq of actively concealing its weapons and obstructing UNSCOM's work:

Iraq never kept its side of the bargain by: not making honest disclosure statements of its prohibited weapons and weapons capability; unilaterally destroying weapons in order to ensure that the Commission would never know the full nature and scope of what it had held and this, under circumstances where the law required that all destruction be conducted under international supervision; and, through the pursuit of an active policy and practice of concealing weapons and proscribed components from the Commission.

In a 1999 interview he said:

I like to refer to the existence of the "anti-UNSCOM industry." They have an enormous bureaucracy, established for the purpose of defeating UNSCOM, run by a high government committee, with a government ministry, called the National Monitoring Directorate. I mean, Tariq Aziz directs this. And there's no question that for every person we would put into the field, they would have ten. I mean, I wonder whether it's not the second largest industry in Iraq, after the oil industry. I mean, it's a very big show. They have been extremely active in seeking to defeat our work. That's been a big problem for us.

In 1998 Iraq accused Butler and other UNSCOM officials of acting as spies for the United States, but the UNSCOM weapons inspectors were not expelled from the country by Iraq as has often been reported (and as George W. Bush alleged in his infamous "axis of evil" speech). Rather, according to Butler himself in his book Saddam Defiant (2000), it was U.S. Ambassador Peter Burleigh, acting on instructions from Washington, who suggested Butler pull his team from Iraq in order to protect them from the forthcoming U.S. and British airstrikes. A number of media reports in the United States suggested that there was some substance to the spying allegations and to the charge that he was tailoring UNSCOM's findings to suit the United States.

Eric Fournier, a French diplomat who served as Butler's deputy at UNSCOM in 1998, told an Australian journalist, Christopher Kremmer, that the US bombing of Iraq in 1998—which made the UNSCOM mission untenable—occurred "because Richard Butler reported that the Iraqis had not cooperated with inspections, even though more than three hundred had taken place in a few weeks and only a handful had been a problem. Three out of three hundred did not go perfectly smoothly...the report, drafted like that, was a good excuse for some members of the Security Council to take action". According to Fournier, by the time of the bombing, UNSCOM had been able to destroy all of Iraq's mobile launchers for the Al-Hussein modified Scud missiles, 73 of Iraq's 75 chemical & biological warheads, and 817 of Iraq's 819 imported operational missiles with a proscribed range of over 500 kilometres. Fournier also told Kremmer that Butler at one point sounded positive about closing the disarmament issue. But then he received a call from the state department who weren't happy with a positive outcome in Iraq.

Both The Washington Post and The Boston Globe, citing anonymous sources, said that Butler had known of and co-operated with a US electronic eavesdropping operation that allowed intelligence agents to monitor military communications in Iraq. This was confirmed by UNSCOM insider Rod Barton on Australian television in February 2005. This intelligence was used to target US air attacks on Iraq.

Butler admitted that foreign intelligence agencies were being used to locate Iraqi WMD but denied allegations that he colluded with the U.S. to access Saddam Hussein's private channel via "piggybacking" UNSCOM. He also stated that foreign intelligence activities decreased during 1998. He was publicly supported by Kofi Annan, but Annan was reported to be privately seeking Butler's resignation, which occurred a few months later. After leaving UNSCOM in 1999 Butler was a Diplomat-in-Residence at the Council of Foreign Relations.

During the 2003 invasion of Iraq, Butler, despite his earlier criticism of Saddam Hussein, opposed the US-led invasion and Australian participation in it. In July 2003 he called for the resignations of Prime Minister John Howard and Foreign Minister Alexander Downer, who he said had misled the Australian people over the war.

== Governor of Tasmania ==
=== Appointment ===
In August 2003 the Labor Premier of Tasmania, Jim Bacon, announced the appointment of Butler as Governor of Tasmania. He was sworn in on 3 October. His appointment was criticised on the grounds that he was not Tasmanian by either birth or association, that he was too closely identified with the Labor Party, and that he was a republican, and thus not a suitable person to represent the Queen of Australia, Elizabeth II, in Tasmania.

The Melbourne daily The Age wrote:

The Sydney-born Mr Butler – who has visited 90 countries and lived in 20 – has hardly spent any time in Tasmania at all. Tenuous though his links to the state may be, it is not his "outsider" status that is at issue. More to the point is that Mr Butler is an avowed, indeed, a vociferous republican. In a state where the role of Queen's representative is taken seriously, that may lead to a degree of suspicion among Her Majesty's more loyal subjects.

Butler sought to ease such fears by saying: "I will give no gratuitous offence to any monarchist. It would be pointless and offensive to do so. The day will come when the next part of the Australian story will be told, but in the meantime we get on with our story today and the process of building and making Tasmania grow."

He added: "I hope my international knowledge, my contacts, my experience in the global environment will enable me to make a contribution to the growing international awareness of Tasmania."

He married Jennifer Grey, his third wife, the day after he was sworn in as governor and commenced his term by leaving for a three-week overseas honeymoon. His explanation for the choice of day was that it was also the day after his divorce from Barbara Evans which had only become absolute on the same day he was sworn in as governor.

=== Controversy ===
Criticisms of various kinds continued thereafter. When Butler broke with established vice-regal convention against public comment on domestic and international affairs, Premier Paul Lennon (who had replaced Jim Bacon in February 2004), specifically requested him to refrain from doing so.

In August 2004, the Tasmanian Liberal Opposition Leader, Rene Hidding, withdrew his support for Butler, and a federal Labor Member of Parliament, Harry Quick, also criticised him. In the same week, three long-serving staff members at Government House resigned amid claims of difficulties in working with Butler and his wife.

These departures occurred while Butler was once again on leave, this time for two weeks, during which time he made three public appearances in performances of Aaron Copland's Lincoln Portrait (a work for speaker and orchestra) with the Sydney Symphony Orchestra. Reporters tried to speak to Butler while on his way to rehearsals of this work, but were told to leave him and his wife alone as they were "on holiday". He was nevertheless billed for the performance as "The Hon Richard Butler, Governor of Tasmania".

When asked for his view of the growing public controversy about Butler's performance and behaviour as governor, Prime Minister John Howard said he would not comment on a matter reserved for state authorities, but he nevertheless made the point, repeatedly, that "this was not my appointment".

=== Resignation ===
On 9 August 2004, after a three-hour meeting with Lennon, Butler announced his resignation, citing a desire to end a "malicious campaign" against him and his wife. Lennon said Butler had dealt with the situation "with honour" and that the decision to resign was "courageous and statesman-like".

Butler's supporters held he had been hounded from office by monarchists and the Murdoch press; the Murdoch-owned Hobart newspaper The Mercury having run a series of articles critical of Butler's performance in the lead-up to his resignation. These aired such matters as his lengthy honeymoon, his alleged inability to get on with staff, and his allegedly arrogant and patronising manner.

On 5 August The Mercury carried an article reporting the University of Tasmania political scientist Richard Herr as saying that "recent goings-on at Government House appeared inconsistent with legislation attached to the office of Governor." Some of the matters raised included an alleged breach of protocol with the welcome of the Botswanan High Commissioner and a luncheon given for him, at which Jennifer Butler officiated. The point was made that the spouse of a governor has no status in their own right during the governor's absence, and that this function should have been hosted by the Lieutenant-Governor, the Chief Justice of the Supreme Court of Tasmania, the Hon William Cox.

Upon Butler's resignation, William Cox was appointed acting governor. He was appointed Governor of Tasmania later that year.

The day after Butler's resignation, Lennon said that he had offered Butler an ex gratia payment of A$650,000 in compensation for the loss of four years' expected income from the remainder of his five-year term. This payment, which was not constitutionally required, was widely criticised in the press and by the Tasmanian Opposition. Both the Prime Minister, John Howard and the federal Opposition Leader, Mark Latham, were critical of the payment, which Latham described as "sickening."

The Butler fallout resurfaced briefly in September 2005 following the release of Latham's diaries. Latham had earlier resigned as Federal ALP leader in January of that year amid acrimonious circumstances with his ALP colleagues. His diaries claimed that Lennon had discussed with him Butler's payout despite being publicly critical about it. Latham also wrote that Butler as Tasmania's governor was drunk at the 2004 Danish royal wedding and it cost him his job.

Opposition Leader Rene Hidding questioned Lennon in Parliament about Latham's claims on the payout. Lennon dismissed what Latham wrote in his diaries saying that they are "a tirade of invective and abuse levelled at everybody and anybody who had anything to do with Mark Latham. The man has no credibility. Anything he says or writes has no credibility."

== Honours ==
Butler was appointed a Member of the Order of Australia (AM) in the 1988 Australia Day Honours, "In recognition of service to international peace and disarmament".

On 5 September 2003, while Governor-designate of Tasmania, Butler was promoted to Companion of the Order of Australia (AC).

== Bibliography ==
- The Greatest Threat: Iraq, Weapons of Mass Destruction, and the Crisis of Global Security (ISBN 1-58648-039-1).
- Fatal Choice: Nuclear Weapons and the Illusion of Missile Defense (ISBN 0-8133-4097-7)
- Saddam Defiant: The Threat of Weapons of Mass Destruction, and the Crisis of Global Security (UK Version Publisher: Weidenfeld & Nicolson, 25 May 2000. ISBN 0-297-64600-1)

Government offices
Preceded by Sir Guy Green	Governor of Tasmania; 2003–2004	Succeeded by William Cox
Diplomatic posts
Preceded by Richard Smith	Australian Ambassador to Thailand; 1989–1992	Succeeded by John McCarthy
New title	Permanent Representative of Australia to the Conference on Disarmament; 1983–1989	Succeeded by David Reese
Preceded by Peter Wilenski	Permanent Representative of Australia to the United Nations; 1992–1996	Succeeded by Penelope Wensley
