= Dallas Brooks =

British military commander (1896–1966)

General Sir Dallas Brooks GCMG KCB KCVO DSO KStJ
- Sir Dallas Brooks

Administrator of the Commonwealth
- In office 3 February 1961 – 3 August 1961
- Monarch: Elizabeth II
- Preceded by: The Viscount Dunrossil (as Governor-General)
- Succeeded by: The Viscount De L'Isle (as Governor-General)

19th Governor of Victoria
- In office 18 October 1949 – 7 May 1963
- Monarchs: George VI (1949–52); Elizabeth II (1952–63)
- Preceded by: Sir Winston Dugan
- Succeeded by: Sir Rohan Delacombe

Personal details
- Born: 22 August 1896 Cambridge, Cambridgeshire, England
- Died: 22 March 1966 (aged 69) Frankston, Victoria, Australia
- Spouse: Muriel Violet Turner Laing

Military service
- Allegiance: United Kingdom
- Branch/service: Royal Marines
- Years of service: 1914–1949
- Rank: General
- Commands: Commandant General Royal Marines (1946–49); Political Warfare Executive (1943–46)
- Battles/wars: First World War; Second World War
- Awards: Knight Grand Cross of the Order of St Michael and St George; Knight Commander of the Order of the Bath; Knight Commander of the Royal Victorian Order; Companion of the Distinguished Service Order; Knight of the Order of St John; Mentioned in Despatches (2); Croix de guerre (France)

Reginald Brooks
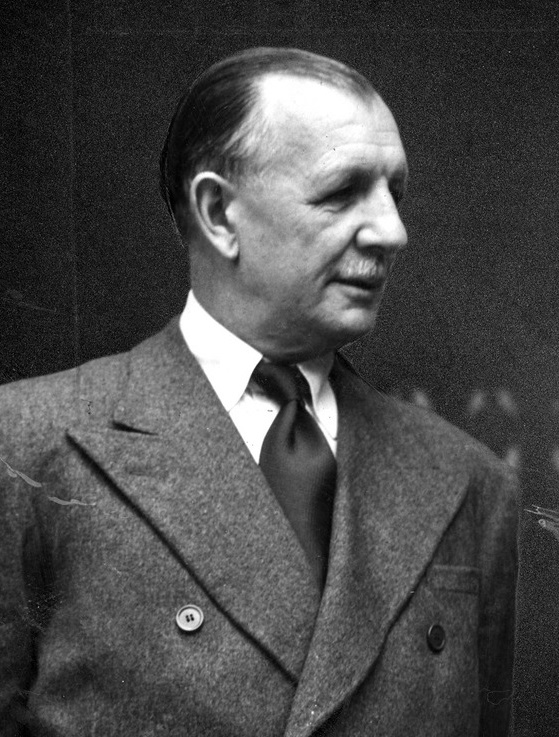

Cricket information
- Batting: Right-handed
- Bowling: Right-arm medium

Domestic team information
- Years: Team
- 1919–1921: Hampshire

Career statistics
Competition	FC
Matches	29
Runs scored	1,070
Batting average	20.57
100s/50s	2/3
Top score	143
Balls bowled	1,942
Wickets	38
Bowling average	28.73
5 wickets in innings	1
10 wickets in match	–
Best bowling	8/90
Catches/stumpings	15/–
- Source: Cricinfo, 1 February 2010

General Sir Reginald Alexander Dallas Brooks, GCMG, KCB, KCVO, DSO, KStJ (22 August 1896 – 22 March 1966) was a British military commander who went on to become the 19th and longest-serving governor of Victoria, Australia.

== Early life ==
Brooks was born on 22 August 1896 at Cambridge, Cambridgeshire, son of Dallas George Brooks and Violet Ruth Brooks, née Shepherd. He was the only son and had three sisters.

Brooks was educated at Dover College and joined the Royal Marines in 1914. During the First World War he was severely wounded during the Gallipoli landings in 1915. He took part in the Zeebrugge Raid in 1918, for which he was appointed a Companion of the Distinguished Service Order. The citation for the award appeared in The Edinburgh Gazette in July 1918 and reads as follows:

He imbued his men with the highest degree of devotion to duty. The manner in which the howitzer, in its exposed position on the quarter deck, was used under his personal direction was very fine.

== Cricketing career ==
Upon returning from war, Brooks made his first-class debut for the Royal Navy against Cambridge University in 1919 as a right-handed batsman who bowled right-arm medium. The same season he made his debut for Hampshire against Surrey in the County Championship. Brooks represented Hampshire eight times in the 1919, making his maiden first-class century against Gloucestershire with a score of 107.

Brooks represented Hampshire in nine first-class matches between 1919 and 1921, with his final first-class appearance for the county coming against Middlesex. He scored 244 runs for Hampshire at a batting average of 16.26, with one century and one half century and a high score of 107.

In 1920, Brooks made his second first-class century, this time for the Royal Navy against the Army, which gave him his highest first-class score of 143. He played as an all-rounder for the Royal Navy, a role he did not fill at Hampshire.

In all, Brooks represented the Royal Navy in sixteen first-class matches, with his final appearance for them coming against the Royal Air Force in 1929. In his sixteen matches for the Royal Navy, Brooks scored 690 runs at a batting average of 23.00, with one century and two half centuries and a highest score of 143. With the ball, he took 38 wickets at a bowling average of 27.63, with one five-wicket haul, which gave him his career-best figures of 8/90.

Additionally, Brooks represented the Combined Services with four first-class matches.

== Military career ==
Brooks, who on 1 October 1932 was promoted to major, graduated from the Royal Navy Staff College in 1934, and from 1943 served as Director-General (Military) of the Political Warfare Executive. In 1946, he was appointed Commandant General Royal Marines in the rank of lieutenant general. He was promoted to general in 1948, knighted that year, and retired in May 1949.

== Governor of Victoria ==
Brooks was appointed Governor of Victoria by Premier Thomas Hollway and served from 1949 to 1963. During his term as governor, he acted as Administrator of the Commonwealth three times. He served in this capacity for almost seven months after the governor-general, Viscount Dunrossil, suddenly died in office in 1961 after serving only one year. Brooks was in effect acting governor-general until the appointment of the Viscount De L'Isle.

Brooks served the state for over 13 years, becoming Victoria's longest-serving governor. After his term ended in 1963, he chose to remain in Australia in retirement. He built a house in Frankston and died there three years later.

His wife, Muriel Violet Turner Brooks, née Laing, whom he married on 3 December 1924, was important in the social life of Melbourne. Invariably referred to as Lady Brooks, she was made a Commander of the Order of St John of Jerusalem in 1951 in recognition of her support for that organisation. She was patron of the Victorian Diabetic Association and president of the Victorian Red Cross Association.

== Freemasonry ==
Brooks was Grand Master of the United Grand Lodge of Victoria of Freemasons from 1951 to 1963. He was Victoria's longest-serving Grand Master, and he is the only governor of any Australian state initiated to the craft while serving as governor. Brooks had expressed a desire to become a freemason while in England but he had also stated that he preferred to become initiated in Australia. He met with the Grand Master of Victoria and notified him. He was initiated in the Clarke Lodge No. 98 on 6 February 1950 and was passed and raised within two months. He became Worshipful Master of the Lodge only five months after his initiation and he was elected Grand Master of the Grand Lodge of Victoria the following year.

== Legacy ==
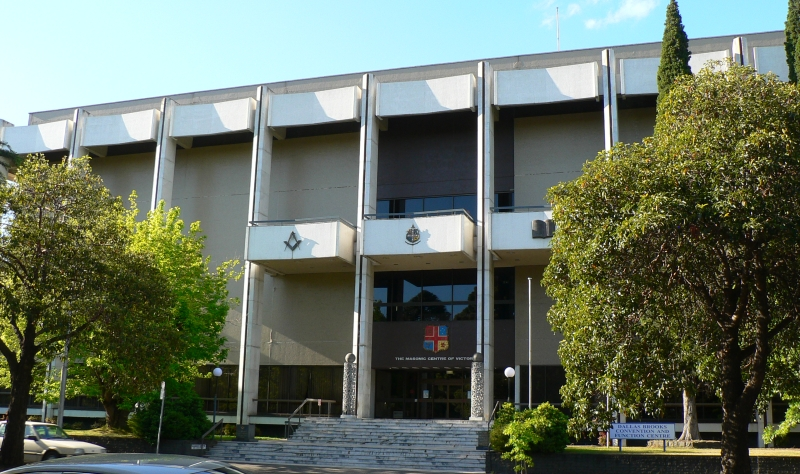
Dallas Brooks Hall, East Melbourne

In 1969, the United Grand Lodge of Victoria built a concert hall in East Melbourne. The hall was renamed in 1993 from the Dallas Brooks Hall to the Dallas Brooks Centre and was a major events venue in Melbourne until 2016 when it was demolished to build an apartment complex.

The Melbourne suburb of Dallas was named after Sir Dallas, as well as Dallas Brooks Drive in Kings Domain. The official residence of the governor of Victoria, Government House, is located on the corner of Birdwood Avenue and Dallas Brooks Drive.

Brooks was the grandfather of journalist and television presenter Jennifer Byrne.

Members of the organisation of Scouts Australia, Sir Dallas Brooks Rover Crew, also adopted the name of the General.

Military offices
Preceded by Sir Thomas Hunton	Commandant General Royal Marines; 1946–1949	Succeeded by Sir Leslie Hollis
Government offices
Preceded by Sir Winston Dugan	Governor of Victoria; 1949–1963	Succeeded by Sir Rohan Delacombe
Masonic offices
Preceded by Richard Rowe	Grand Master of the United Grand Lodge of Victoria; 1951–1963	Succeeded by Eric Hughes
