= Phillip Bennett =

Australian Army officer and Governor of Tasmania (1928–2023)

General Sir Phillip Bennett AC, KBE, DSO
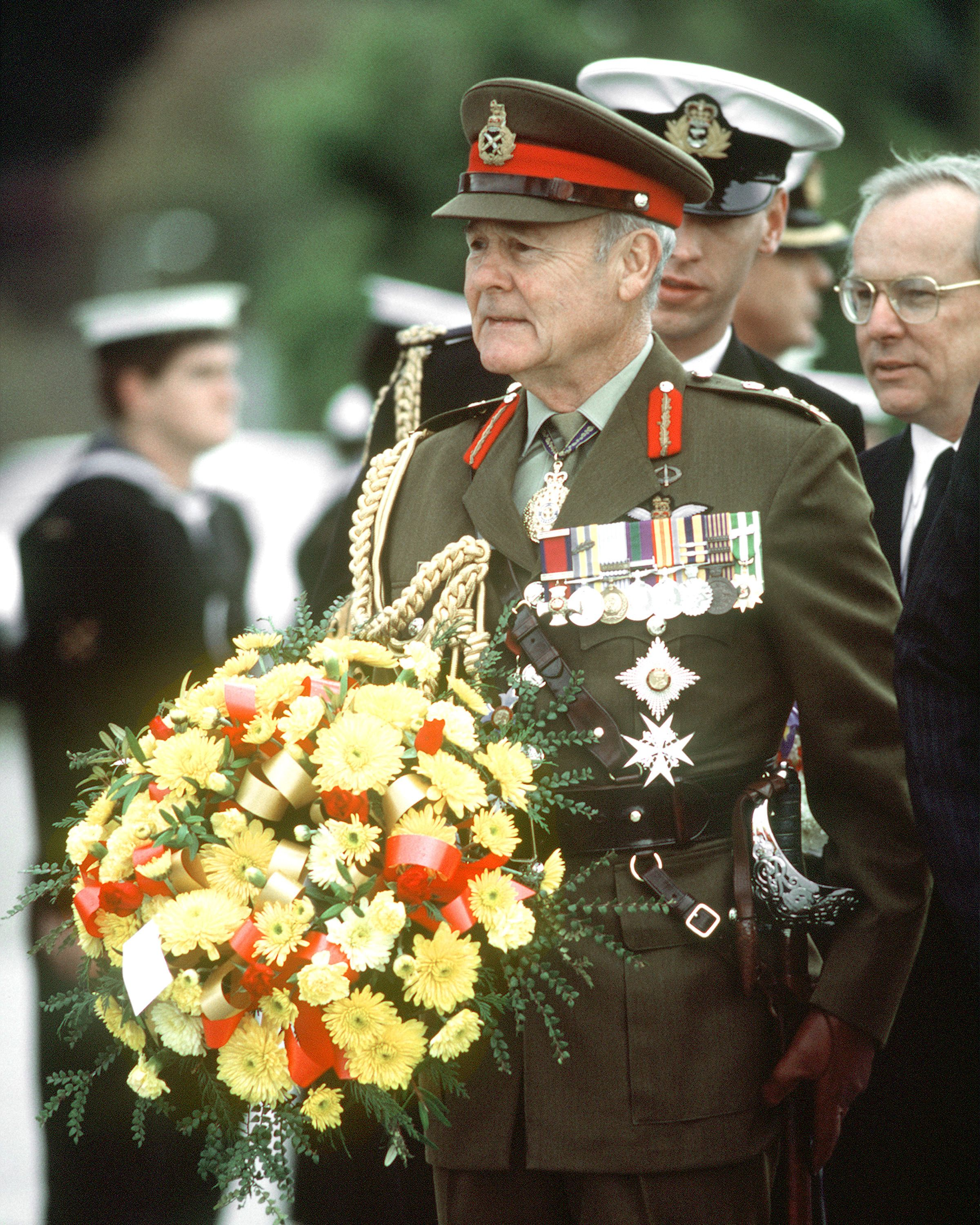
- Bennett in 1992

23rd Governor of Tasmania
- In office 19 October 1987 – 2 October 1995
- Monarch: Elizabeth II
- Premier: Robin Gray; Michael Field; Ray Groom
- Preceded by: Sir James Plimsoll
- Succeeded by: Sir Guy Green

Personal details
- Born: 27 December 1928 Perth, Western Australia, Australia
- Died: 1 August 2023 (aged 94)
- Spouse(s): Margaret, Lady Bennett
- Occupation: Soldier

Military service
- Allegiance: Australia
- Branch/service: Australian Army
- Years of service: 1946–1987
- Rank: General
- Commands: Chief of the Defence Force (1984–87); Chief of General Staff (1982–84); 1st Division (1977–79); 1st Battalion, Royal Australian Regiment (1967–69); 2nd Commando Company (1958–61)
- Battles/wars: Korean War; Malayan Emergency; Vietnam War; Battle of Coral–Balmoral
- Awards: Companion of the Order of Australia; Knight Commander of the Order of the British Empire; Distinguished Service Order; Knight of the Order of St John; Mentioned in Despatches; Commander of the Legion of Merit (United States)

General Sir Phillip Harvey Bennett, AC, KBE, DSO (27 December 1928 – 1 August 2023) was a senior officer of the Australian Army who served as Chief of the Australian Defence Force from 1984 to 1987, and later as Governor of Tasmania from 1987 to 1995.

== Early life ==
Bennett was born in Perth, Western Australia, and educated at Perth Modern School and the Royal Military College, Duntroon, from which he graduated as a lieutenant on 14 December 1948. With 13 other new officers, he was posted in March 1949 to 67 Infantry Battalion, The Australian Regiment, then in the British Commonwealth Occupation Force, Japan.

== Military career ==
Bennett served in Japan until September 1950 and then embarked with the 3rd Battalion, Royal Australian Regiment for Korea where he served for a year during which he was wounded in action on 14 October 1950, remaining on duty, and Mentioned in Despatches in 1951. He served again for 12 months in Korea from 1 September 1952 as Senior Instructor, then Chief Instructor, with the 25th Canadian Infantry Brigade Junior NCO School while posted as Tactics Instructor at the School of Infantry in Seymour, Victoria.

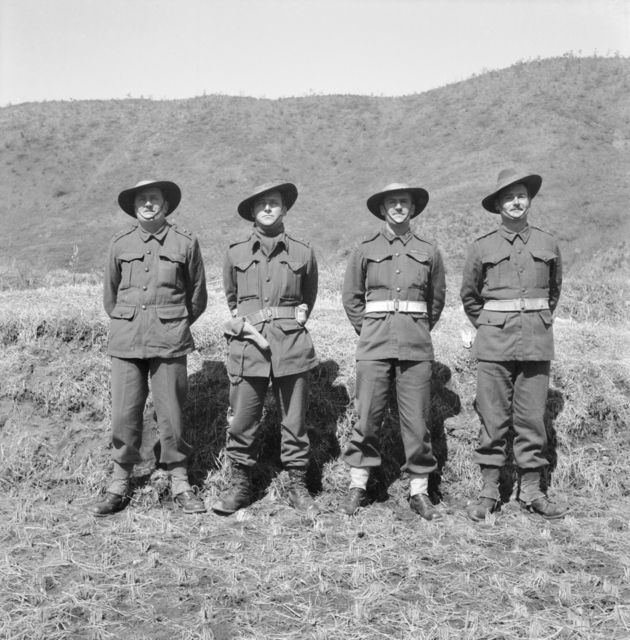
Four officers of Support Company, 3rd Battalion, Royal Australian Regiment in Korea, C. March 1951 – Lieutenant Kevin Innes-Kerr; Lieutenant C. Evans; Major Archer Paterson Denness MC; Captain P.H. Bennett

On his return to Australia in 1953, Bennett became the adjutant of the 1st Battalion, Pacific Islands Regiment in PNG. In 1954, he was adjutant with the 16th Infantry Battalion (CMF), and in 1956, Staff Captain A in HQ Western Command. In 1957–58, he served in the United Kingdom with the Royal Marine Commandos and saw duty in Malta, and operational service in Cyprus. He then served as OC 2nd Commando Company from July 1958 to June 1961, and after attending the Australian Staff College, became the Senior Instructor, then Chief Instructor, at Officer Cadet School, Portsea from 1962 to 1965. He was then posted until 10 July 1967 to Army HQ which had moved to Canberra in the early 1960s from Melbourne.

Bennett then commanded the 1st Battalion, Royal Australian Regiment, where he was a key commander in the Battle of Coral–Balmoral. This battle was the largest unit-level action of the Vietnam War for the Australians and today the battle is considered one of the most famous actions fought by the Australian Army during the war. For his service in Vietnam in 1968–69, Bennett was awarded the Distinguished Service Order. On return from UK Joint service training in 1971 he became Colonel Coordination in the office of Chief of the General Staff and in April 1974 was promoted to brigadier, Chief of Staff at HQ Field Force Command in Sydney until December 1975.

Bennett attended senior officer training at the Australian Staff College first long course in 1960–61, Joint Services Staff College in the UK as a student then exchange instructor 1969–71, and then the Royal College of Defence Studies in the UK in 1976. He commanded the 1st Division 1977–79, became Assistant Chief of Defence Staff 1979–82, Chief of the General Staff 1982–84 and Chief of the Defence Force in 1984 (the position having been changed from Chief of the Defence Staff). He retired from the Army in April 1987.

== Governor of Tasmania ==
During his period as governor, Bennett was called on to be the adjudicator of a sensitive constitutional problem following the 1989 Tasmanian state election. The Liberal Government of Premier Robin Gray had suffered a two-seat swing, leaving it one seat short of a majority. The opposition Labor Party led by Michael Field then garnered the support of the five Green members of the House of Assembly for a minority government in what was known as the Labor-Green Accord.

Gray refused to resign immediately, intending to stay in office until defeated in the House. When defeated on a no-confidence motion, he canvassed asking Bennett to dissolve the legislature and call new elections. Under normal circumstances, Bennett would have been bound by convention to honour this request. However, Bennett indicated he would be unlikely to accept such advice. He believed that Gray was no longer in a position to govern, and therefore had lost the right to ask for a dissolution. He'd also been privately assured before the formal accord was signed that the Greens would back a Labor government. Gray was thus forced to resign, and Bennett commissioned Field as premier.

Bennett on several occasions also became Administrator of the Commonwealth during overseas visits by the then Governor-General, Bill Hayden.

== Retirement ==
After retiring from the governorship, Bennett served as inaugural chairman of the Australian War Memorial Foundation. He was the Patron of the 2 Commando Association (now the Australian Commando Association Victoria) from 1985, Patron of The St John Ambulance in the ACT from 1996, and a president of the Order of Australia Association (elected National President of the Order of Australian Association in March 1997). He was also the inaugural National Patron of the Royal Australian Regiment Association.

A biography of Bennett's life, The Last Knight by Robert Lowry, was published in 2011.

== Death ==
Sir Philip Bennett died on 1 August 2023, at the age of 94.

== Awards and honours ==
Parachutist Badge

Bennett was appointed a Companion of the Distinguished Service Order (DSO) in 1969 for service as commanding officer of the 1st Battalion, Royal Australian Regiment in Vietnam. Bennett was made an Officer in the Military Division of the Order of Australia (AO) in 1981, a Knight Commander in the Military Division of the Order of the British Empire (KBE) in 1982, and was promoted to Companion of the Order of Australia (AC) in 1985.

Bennett was Mentioned in Despatches for; 'During the period, 9 November 1950 to June 1951, this officer performed the duty of mortar platoon commander through that period. His support of battalion attacks was of the highest order etc.'

In 1983, he was made a Commander of the US Legion of Merit, and in 1985, was awarded the South Korean Order of National Security Merit. He was awarded an Honorary LLD (NSW) in October 1995 for his contribution to military education and the Australian Defence Force Academy. He was made a Knight of St John in 1988 and awarded the degree of Doctor of Laws, honoris causa, by the University of Tasmania in 1992. He was awarded the Centenary Medal in 2001.

Military offices
New title Position replaced Chief of Defence Force Staff	Chief of the Defence Force; 1984–1987	Succeeded by General Peter Gration
Preceded by Air Chief Marshal Sir Neville McNamara	Chief of Defence Force Staff; April – October 1984	Position replaced by Chief of the Defence Force
Preceded by Lieutenant General Sir Donald Dunstan	Chief of General Staff; 1982–1984	Succeeded by Lieutenant General Peter Gration
Preceded by Major General Bruce McDonald	Commander 1st Division; 1977–1979	Succeeded by Major General John Kelly
Government offices
Preceded by Sir James Plimsoll	Governor of Tasmania; 1987–1994	Succeeded by Sir Guy Green
