= Kate Warner =

Former Governor of Tasmania

Professor the Honourable Kate Warner AC FAAL
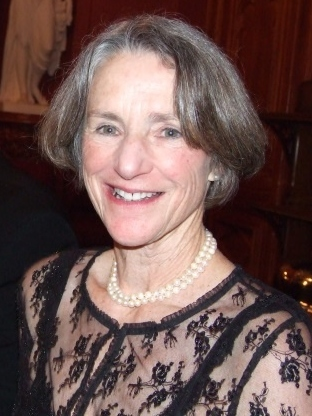
- Warner in 2016

28th Governor of Tasmania
- In office 10 December 2014 – 16 June 2021
- Monarch: Elizabeth II
- Premier: Will Hodgman; Peter Gutwein
- Lieutenant: Alan Blow
- Preceded by: Peter Underwood
- Succeeded by: Barbara Baker

Personal details
- Born: Catherine Ann Friend; 14 July 1948 (age 78) Hobart, Tasmania
- Spouse: Richard Warner (m. 1971)
- Education: Bachelor of Laws (Honours); Master of Laws
- Alma mater: St Michael's Collegiate School; University of Tasmania
- Profession: Legal academic
- Warner's voice recorded September 2018

Catherine Ann Warner AC FAAL (born 14 July 1948) is an Australian lawyer and legal academic who was the 28th Governor of Tasmania from 2014 to 2021.

== Early life and education ==
Warner was born Catherine Ann Friend in Hobart, Tasmania, and attended St Michael's Collegiate School and the University of Tasmania, where she graduated with a Bachelor of Laws with Honours on 15 April 1970, and with a Master of Laws by research thesis on 7 December 1978. Her master's thesis focused on "Presentence Psychiatric Reports in Tasmania".

== Legal and academic career ==
After graduation, Warner worked as Associate to the Chief Justice of Tasmania, Sir Stanley Burbury, at the Supreme Court of Tasmania and was admitted as a barrister and solicitor in 1971. Following completion of her master's thesis in 1978, she commenced her lengthy career as an academic at the University of Tasmania Law School. She was promoted to Lecturer in 1981, to Senior Lecturer in 1989, Associate Professor in 1993, and Professor in 1996.

In 1992, Warner was appointed dean of the Faculty of Law and later was appointed head of the School of Law (the first woman to hold these positions at the University of Tasmania). She was promoted to professor in 1996 and in 2002 was appointed as foundation director of the Tasmania Law Reform Institute.

Warner was awarded the Allen Austin Bartholomew Award for the best article in the Australian and New Zealand Journal of Criminology in each year from 2004 to 2007.

Warner is an internationally recognised expert in the fields of criminal law, criminology and sentencing and has taught, researched and published in these areas for 30 years.

== Governor of Tasmania ==
On 10 November 2014, the Premier of Tasmania, Will Hodgman, announced that Warner would be appointed as the 28th governor of Tasmania, after the death in office of Peter Underwood. She was sworn in on 10 December 2014. On 26 September 2019, Hodgman announced that the Queen had approved his request to extend Warner's term by a year, ending 19 December 2020. On 24 June 2020, Premier Peter Gutwein announced that the Queen had approved his request to extend Warner's term by six months, ending 9 June 2021.

== Personal life ==
On 13 January 2019, it was announced that Warner had been diagnosed with non-Hodgkin lymphoma.

== Honours ==
Viceregal styles of Kate Warner (2014–2021)
- Reference style: Her Excellency the Honourable
- Spoken style: Your Excellency

Orders

- 26 January 2014: Member of the Order of Australia (AM) for services to law.
- (United Kingdom) 2014: Dame of the Order of St John (DStJ)
- 26 January 2017: Companion of the Order of Australia (AC) for eminent service to the people of Tasmania through leading contributions to the legal community, particularly to law reform, to higher education as an academic, researcher and publisher, and as a supporter of the arts, and environmental and social justice initiatives.

Medals

- (Australia) 1 January 2001: Centenary Medal

Organisation

- 2012: Distinguished Service Medal by the University of Tasmania
- (Tasmania) 2012: Biennial Achievement Award by Tasmanian Women Lawyers Association

=== Appointments ===
Fellowships

- (Australia) 2007: Foundation Fellow of the Australian Academy of Law
- (United Kingdom) 2009: Fellow of All Souls College, Oxford
- (United Kingdom) 2014: Deputy Prior of the Order of St John
- (Australia) 2015: Honorary Fellow of Jane Franklin Hall, University of Tasmania
- (Australia) 2017: Fellow of the Australian and New Zealand Society of Criminology

Government offices
Preceded by Peter Underwood	Governor of Tasmania; 2014–2021	Succeeded by Barbara Baker
