= Administrator (Australia) =

Australian government official

In Australia, the title Administrator, or more fully Administrator of the Government, has several uses. In each case, the Administrator fulfills constitutional and ceremonial roles in the Australian political system, on a caretaker basis.

While they have independent agency, administrators are generally bound by convention to act on the advice of the first minister and the Executive Council.

== Administrator of the Commonwealth ==
Section four of the Australian Constitution provides that:

The provisions of this Constitution relating to the Governor-General extend and apply to the Governor-General for the time being, or such person as the Queen may appoint to administer the Government of the Commonwealth; but no such person shall be entitled to receive any salary from the Commonwealth in respect of any other office during his administration of the Government of the Commonwealth.

Administrator of the Commonwealth of Australia
- Coat of Arms of Australia
- Viceregal
- Style: Their Excellency
- Appointer: Monarch of Australia; on the advice of the Prime Minister
- Term length: At His Majesty's pleasure

Accordingly, an Administrator assumes the administration of the government when the Governor-General dies, resigns or is absent from Australia. The administrator is styled either Administrator of the Commonwealth or, less commonly, Administrator of the Government of the Commonwealth. By convention, each of the state governors holds a dormant commission from the sovereign (currently Charles III) to act as administrator and the commission is taken up by the longest-serving governor who is in Australia, able, and willing to act. In the event that an Administrator died in office, was required to leave the country, or was otherwise unable to discharge their office, the next-longest serving state governor would become Administrator.

There have been four separate occasions during which a governor of one of the states has administered the government of the Commonwealth for an extended period due to unforeseen circumstances:

- 17 July 1902 – 9 January 1903; Hallam Tennyson, 2nd Baron Tennyson, Governor of South Australia since April 1899, was appointed by Edward VII to the office after the sudden resignation of the Earl of Hopetoun. After several months as Administrator, Baron Tennyson was appointed to the office of Governor-General permanently, which is to date the only occasion on which this has occurred.
- 2 October 1930 – 21 January 1931; Arthur Somers-Cocks, 6th Baron Somers, who had been the Governor of Victoria since June 1926, became Administrator by dormant commission after the term of The Viscount Stonehaven expired and he left Australia. Sir Isaac Isaacs, the Chief Justice of Australia since April 1930, was appointed to the position permanently from January 1931. Lord Somers retired as Governor of Victoria later that year.
- 3 February 1961 – 3 August 1961; General Sir Dallas Brooks, Governor of Victoria since October 1949, ascended to the position by the power of his dormant commission after the death of The Viscount Dunrossil. Lord De L'Isle was appointed as Governor-General a few months later in August 1961. Brooks retired as Governor of Victoria in May 1963.
- 28 May 2003 – 11 August 2003; After Peter Hollingworth announced his resignation and his commission was withdrawn by Elizabeth II, Sir Guy Green, who had been Governor of Tasmania since October 1995, assumed the position by dormant commission. Prime Minister John Howard announced his replacement, Michael Jeffery, in mid-2003, and he took office in August. Green retired as Governor of Tasmania later that year.

On 11 May 2003, the letters patent commissioning the Governor-General were amended to enable Peter Hollingworth to stand aside as Governor-General following a controversy about his past handling of child abuse allegations, and Tasmanian Governor Sir Guy Green was appointed Administrator until Hollingworth's permanent replacement (Major General Michael Jeffery) took office on 8 August 2003.

The present longest serving state governor is Margaret Beazley who has been Governor of New South Wales since 2 May 2019.

Former Governor-General Sir Peter Cosgrove was specially commissioned to act as Administrator of the Government of the Commonwealth of Australia in May 2023, when Governor-General David Hurley and all state Governors were simultaneously absent from the Commonwealth to attend the Coronation of Charles III and Camilla. When the Governor-General attended the state funeral of Elizabeth II the previous year, Governor of Victoria Linda Dessau acted as Administrator.

An Administrator is styled Their Excellency while in office.

== Administrator of a state ==
In the Australian states, when the governor dies, resigns or is absent, the lieutenant-governor (appointed by the governor on the advice of the state premier) performs the official duties of the governor as administrator until a new governor is appointed. In the absence of both a governor and lieutenant-governor, the chief of the state's supreme court or the next most senior puisne judge, traditionally holding, ex officio, the position of lieutenant-governor, assumes their position as head of the executive until a governor is appointed. In 2001, the Constitution of Queensland was amended to restore the office of lieutenant-governor in that state.

== Administrator of a territory ==
Unlike the Australian states, each of which is a possession of the Crown in its own right and which therefore possesses a governor directly representing the King, all Australian territories are possessions of the Crown in right of the Commonwealth of Australia and the sole direct representative of the Crown therefore remains the Commonwealth Governor-General. Unlike the states, the territories fall within the exclusive legislative and administrative competence of the Commonwealth. In respect of several territories the Governor-General is represented in the territory by an Administrator appointed to administer the territory on his or her behalf. In those territories with an Administrator, the Administrator can be considered the indirect representative of the King in the territory.

=== Northern Territory ===
In the Northern Territory, which is not a state and does not have a Governor, but which is self-governing with its own legislature and executive, the role of the Crown is filled by an Administrator of the Northern Territory appointed by the Governor-General-in-Council—that is, the Governor-General acting on the formal advice of the Federal Executive Council—on the recommendation of the Chief Minister of the Northern Territory, in accordance with the provisions of the Northern Territory (Self-Government) Act 1978 (Cth).

=== Australian Capital Territory ===
The Australian Capital Territory (ACT) does not have an Administrator. As in all other Australian territories, the Governor-General of the Commonwealth remains the direct constitutional representative of the monarch in the Territory; however, pursuant to the provisions of the Australian Capital Territory (Self-Government) Act 1988 (Cth) there is a Territory Executive consisting of the Chief Minister of the Australian Capital Territory and any other Ministers admitted by them to the Executive. The Crown is therefore represented by the Governor-General of Australia in the Government of the ACT. However, reserve powers analogous to those vested in a State Governor are vested by the Act in the Federal Minister for Territories, who may, for example, dissolve the ACT Assembly in cases of corruption or deadlock.

=== Other Australian territories ===
As well as the internal and largely self-governing territories of the Northern Territory and the Australian Capital Territory, Australia also possesses (or lays claim to—since Australia's Antarctic claims are not universally recognised) seven external territories, each of which falls within the sphere of influence of the Commonwealth and is administered by the Commonwealth Government. Three of these, Norfolk Island (which enjoys a large degree of autonomy), the Territory of Cocos (Keeling) Islands and the Territory of Christmas Island have permanent populations and also have an Administrator appointed by the Governor-General-in-Council to administer the territory on their behalf. The remaining four external territories, the Australian Antarctic Territory, the Coral Sea Islands Territory, the Territory of Ashmore Reef and Cartier Island, and the Territory of Heard and McDonald Islands have no permanent population and do not have an Administrator as such but are administered directly by the Commonwealth Government, currently under the auspices of the Department of Agriculture, Water and the Environment (Australian Antarctic Territory) and the Department of Infrastructure, Transport, Regional Development, Communications and the Arts (other territories).

In addition to the two self-governing internal territories and Australia's seven external territories, there is also the internal territory of Jervis Bay. Prior to ACT Self-Government in 1989, what is now the Jervis Bay Territory constituted part of the Australian Capital Territory. Upon ACT Self-Government it became a separate territory located on the Australian mainland; for the most part it is populated with Defence Force personnel. The territory does not have an Administrator and is administered directly by the Commonwealth Government.

== Administrator of a local government area ==
In Australia, local government areas are the third tier of government in Australia administered by the states and territories, and in cases where the state government has been obliged to dismiss or suspend the operations of local government in an area, an Administrator is appointed to take the place of the elected mayor and councillors. In New South Wales, with 132 local government authorities in 2016, the powers of an Administrator are set out in Chapter 9, Part 2, Division 6 (Appointment of administrator), sections 255–259, of the Local Government Act 1993. Prominent recent examples of NSW councils being operated by administrators include: Port Macquarie-Hastings Council (2008–2012), City of Wollongong (2008–2012), Tweed Shire (2005–2008), Warringah Council (1965–1967, 1985–1987, 2003–2008), Wingecarribee Shire Council (2021–2024) and Central Coast Council (2020–2024). Tasmanian Huon Valley Council was placed in administration from 2016 until 2018.
