= Stanley Burbury =

Australian judge and governor (1909–1995)

The Honourable Sir Stanley Burbury KCMG, KCVO, KBE, QC

21st Governor of Tasmania
- In office 5 December 1973 – 1 October 1982
- Monarch: Elizabeth II
- Premier: Eric Reece; Bill Neilson; Doug Lowe; Harry Holgate
- Preceded by: Sir Edric Bastyan
- Succeeded by: Sir James Plimsoll

Chief Justice of Tasmania
- In office 28 August 1956 – 29 October 1973
- Preceded by: Sir John Morris
- Succeeded by: Sir Guy Green

Personal details
- Born: 3 December 1909 Perth, Western Australia, Australia
- Died: 24 April 1995 (aged 85) Hobart, Tasmania, Australia
- Spouse: Pearl Barren (m. 1934)
- Education: University of Tasmania
- Profession: Lawyer

Sir Stanley Charles Burbury, KCMG, KCVO, KBE (3 December 1909 – 24 April 1995) was an Australian judge. He served as Chief Justice of Tasmania from 1956 to 1973 and as Governor of Tasmania from 1973 to 1982, the state's first Australian-born governor.

== Early life ==
Burbury was born on 3 December 1909 in Perth, Western Australia. He was the only child of Mary Agatha (née Cunningham) and Daniel Charles Burbury. His father, born in Tasmania, was employed as a metallurgist at the Perth Mint.

Burbury's mother died two months after his birth and he was returned to Tasmania to be raised by his aunt Ada Mary Lakin in Hobart. He contracted poliomyelitis at a young age, leaving him with a lifelong limp. He completed his secondary education at The Hutchins School in Hobart, where he was a prize-winning student. He went on to study law at the University of Tasmania, graduating Bachelor of Laws in 1932.

== Legal career ==
Burbury was admitted to practice law in 1933 and joined the firm of Simmons, Wolfhagen, Simmons, and Walch. He was admitted to partnership in 1937, before establishing his own firm Burbury and Dixon in 1944. He was appointed King's Counsel in 1950 and the following year led a royal commission into Tasmania's apple and pear industry.

In 1952, Burbury was appointed solicitor-general by the state government. He was a vice-warden of the University of Tasmania's senate from 1948 to 1955 and was involved in the controversial dismissal of philosophy professor Sydney Sparkes Orr on morality grounds.

=== Chief Justice of Tasmania ===
In 1956, Premier Robert Cosgrove nominated Burbury to succeed John Morris as Chief Justice of Tasmania. One of his first notable cases was Hursey v Waterside Workers' Federation (1958), where he ruled in favour of two wharf labourers who had failed to pay a compulsory levy to the Waterside Workers' Federation. His decision was overruled on appeal to the High Court the following year.

In 1967 Burbury was appointed by the federal government to lead a second royal commission into the Melbourne–Voyager collision. Outside of the court he also served as president of the National Heart Foundation of Australia from 1967 to 1973.

== Governor of Tasmania ==
Burbury was appointed as Tasmania's first Australian-born governor in 1973. While in office as chief justice, he had previously spent several periods as administrator of the government during gaps between appointments. In that role he granted Eric Reece an early dissolution and called the 1959 Tasmanian state election.

In 1978, Burbury's initial five-year term was extended by three years. During the Franklin Dam controversy, which saw Harry Holgate's ALP government forced into minority after the defection of former premier Doug Lowe to the crossbench, he was petitioned by a majority of the Tasmanian House of Assembly for an early recall of parliament. He rejected the petition after consultation with Holgate on the grounds that the situation could "only be resolved by constitutional procedures on the floor of the House".

== Personal life ==
In 1934, Burbury married Pearl Barren; the couple had no children. They retired to Kingston after his term as governor ended. He died on 24 April 1995 at Calvary Hospital, Hobart, aged 85.

== Honours ==
Burbury was created a Knight Commander of the Order of the British Empire (KBE) in the 1958 New Year Honours.

On 20 April 1977, during the 1977 Royal Visit, Queen Elizabeth II made Burbury a Knight Commander of the Royal Victorian Order (KCVO).

On 28 August 1981 Burbury was made a Knight Commander of the Order of St Michael and St George (KCMG).

== Legacy ==
The impoundment that was created by Hydro Tasmania on the King River on the West Coast of Tasmania, is called Lake Burbury.

The University of Tasmania has a lecture theatre named after Stanley Burbury.

Burbury Close, a street in Barton in the Australian Capital Territory is named after Stanley Burbury.

Legal offices
| Preceded by Sir John Morris | Chief Justice of Tasmania; 1956–1973 | Succeeded by Guy Green |
Government offices
| Preceded by Lieutenant General Sir Edric Bastyan | Governor of Tasmania; 1973–1982 | Succeeded by Sir James Plimsoll |
