= Guy Green (judge) =

Australian judge and Governor of Tasmania (1937–2025)

The Honourable Sir Guy Green AC KBE CVO

Administrator of the Commonwealth
- In office 28 May 2003 – 11 August 2003
- Monarch: Elizabeth II
- Preceded by: Peter Hollingworth (as Governor-General)
- Succeeded by: Michael Jeffery (as Governor-General)

24th Governor of Tasmania
- In office 2 October 1995 – 3 October 2003
- Monarch: Elizabeth II
- Premier: Ray Groom; Tony Rundle; Jim Bacon
- Preceded by: Sir Phillip Bennett
- Succeeded by: Richard Butler

Chief Justice of Tasmania
- In office 30 October 1973 – 1 September 1995
- Preceded by: Stanley Burbury
- Succeeded by: William Cox

Personal details
- Born: 26 July 1937 Launceston, Tasmania, Australia
- Died: 22 July 2025 (aged 87) Hobart, Tasmania, Australia
- Spouse: Rosslyn Green
- Children: 4
- Education: University of Tasmania
- Occupation: Lawyer, judge

Sir Guy Stephen Montague Green, AC, KBE, CVO (26 July 1937 – 22 July 2025) was an Australian judge who served as the Governor of Tasmania from 1995 to 2003. He was the first Tasmanian-born governor of the state, although not the first Australian-born.

== Early life and career ==
Guy Green was born in Launceston, Tasmania, and attended the Launceston Church Grammar School. He studied law at the University of Tasmania's Hobart Campus, graduating with honours in 1960. He was Chief Justice of Tasmania from 1973 until 1995, the culmination of a distinguished career in law in Tasmania, which saw him serve as a magistrate from 1971 to 1973.

Green was also heavily involved in the University of Tasmania, serving as chancellor before his appointment as governor on 2 October 1995. He was awarded an honorary Doctor of Laws by the university in 1996. Sir Guy was also chancellor of the Australian Priory of the Order of St John of Jerusalem before assuming Vice-Regal office. Green was the first Tasmanian-born governor of the state.

On 11 May 2003, the Governor-General, Peter Hollingworth, stood aside following a controversy about his past handling of child abuse allegations. Green, the longest-serving state governor, was appointed Administrator of the Commonwealth, or in effect acting governor-general. Hollingworth later announced that he would not be returning to the position. Green served as administrator until Michael Jeffery took office in August 2003. He retired afterwards and was replaced as Tasmanian governor by Richard Butler.

Green was made a Knight Commander of the Order of the British Empire in 1982, appointed a Companion of the Order of Australia in 1994, and appointed a Commander of the Royal Victorian Order during Queen Elizabeth II's visit to Tasmania in 2000. He was awarded the Centenary Medal in 2001.

On retiring from the governorship, Green continued to contribute to Tasmania, as Chairman of the Board of Trustees of the Tasmanian Museum and Art Gallery (2003-2015, TMAG), and Chairman of the Board of the 10 Days on the Island festival. For being a 'stalwart champion of the natural sciences, particularly taxonomy' while Chairman of TMAG, Green had a species of lichen named after him (Ramboldia Greeniana).

Green served as Tasmania's Honorary Antarctic Ambassador from June 2005 to April 2022. On retirement from the post, Green was appointed Tasmania's Antarctic Patron.

Green was a member (1975–1980) of the Australian Board of The Duke of Edinburgh's International Award and during this period was the Tasmanian chairman for the Award.

== Death ==
Green died from a short illness in Hobart, Tasmania, on 22 July 2025, at the age of 87.

== Honours, awards and styles ==
- Guy Green (1939–1973)
- The Hon. Mr Justice Green (1973–1982)
- The Hon. Sir Guy Green, KBE (1982–1994)
- The Hon. Sir Guy Green, AC, KBE (1994–1995)
- His Excellency the Hon. Sir Guy Green, AC, KBE, 24th Governor of Tasmania (1995–2000)
- His Excellency the Hon. Sir Guy Green, AC, KBE, CVO, 24th Governor of Tasmania (2000–2003)
- The Hon. Sir Guy Green, AC, KBE, CVO (2003–2025)

Companion of the Order of Australia (AC)	1994
Knight Commander of the Order of the British Empire (KBE)	1982
Commander of the Royal Victorian Order (CVO)	2000
Centenary Medal	2001

Legal offices
Preceded by Sir Stanley Burbury	Chief Justice of Tasmania; 1973–1995	Succeeded by William Cox
Government offices
Preceded by Sir Phillip Bennett	Governor of Tasmania; 1995–2003	Succeeded by Richard Butler
