= Governor of Tasmania =

Vice-regal representative of the monarch in Tasmania

- Flag of the Governor
- Incumbent; Caroline Wells since 17 June 2026
- Viceregal
- Style: Her Excellency The Honourable
- Residence: Government House, Hobart
- Appointer: Monarch; on the advice of the premier
- Term length: At His Majesty's pleasure; (typically 5 years)
- Formation: 8 January 1855
- First holder: Sir Henry Fox Young
- Website: govhouse.tas.gov.au

The governor of Tasmania is the representative in the Australian state of Tasmania of the monarch, currently King Charles III. The incumbent governor is Caroline Wells, who has been in the role since 17 June 2026. The official residence of the governor is Government House located in the Queens Domain in Hobart. The governor's primary task is to perform the sovereign's constitutional duties on their behalf.

The position has its origins in the positions of commandant and lieutenant-governor in the colonial administration of Van Diemen's Land. The territory was separated from the Colony of New South Wales in 1825 and the title "governor" was used from 1855, the same year in which it adopted its current name. In accordance with the conventions of the Westminster system of parliamentary government, the governor now almost always acts on the advice of the head of the elected government, the premier of Tasmania.

Tasmania retained British-born governors longer than most other states. The first Australian-born governor was Sir Stanley Burbury (appointed 1973) and the first Tasmanian-born governor was Sir Guy Green (appointed 1995). Since Burbury, all Tasmanian governors have been Australian-born, except for Peter Underwood who was born in Britain but immigrated to Australia when a teenager.

== Role ==
The responsibilities of the Governor of Tasmania include:

- dissolving or proroguing the Parliament of Tasmania
- issuing writs for Tasmanian elections and elections for Tasmanian Senators
- appointing the Premier and other state Ministers
- assenting to Bills, issuing regulations and other proclamations
- presiding over meetings of the Executive Council
- appointing judges, royal commissioners, and individuals to statutory boards and to tribunals.

Although not a responsibility of the office of Governor of Tasmania, governors of Tasmania are - like all Governors of the Australian states - normally given a dormant commission to administer the government of the Commonwealth of Australia in the absence from Australia, or the death, incapacity or removal from office of the Governor-General by the Sovereign.

== Titles ==
Since December 2014, the incumbent and all future Tasmanian governors have been entitled to be styled as Their Excellency The Honourable while in office and styled The Honourable after retirement.

== Governor's personal flag ==
The personal flag of the governor of Tasmania is the same design as the British Blue Ensign with the Union Flag at the upper left quarter. On the right side, the state badge of Tasmania, consisting of a white disk with a red lion passant, is surmounted by St. Edward's Crown. The flag was adopted in 1977.

If the standard is flying at Government House, on a vehicle or vessel, or at an event, this indicates that the governor is present.

Past and present flags of the governor

1875–1876

1876–1977

1977–present

== Divided in two ==
Between 1804 and 1813, Van Diemen's Land was divided along the 42nd parallel, and the two sections governed as separate lieutenant-governorships under the governor of New South Wales. Collins was the only officially appointed lieutenant-governor—upon his death in 1810, the government in Hobart Town was administered, by the Commandants at Hobart Town (Lord, Murray and Geils). The northern settlement at Port Dalrymple (now George Town) was administered by four commandants until the settlements were merged to form the single colony under the governorship of Thomas Davey in 1813.

=== Lieutenant-governors and commandants in the south ===
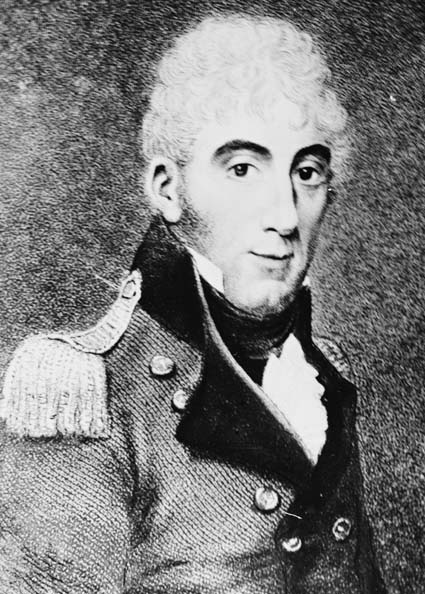
No.	Lieutenant-governor	From	To
1	Colonel David Collins	1804	1810
2	Lieutenant Edward Lord (Commandant at Hobart Town)	March 1810	July 1810
3	Captain John Murray (Commandant at Hobart Town)	1810	1812
4	Lieutenant-Colonel Andrew Geils (Commandant at Hobart Town)	1812	1813

=== Commandants in the north ===
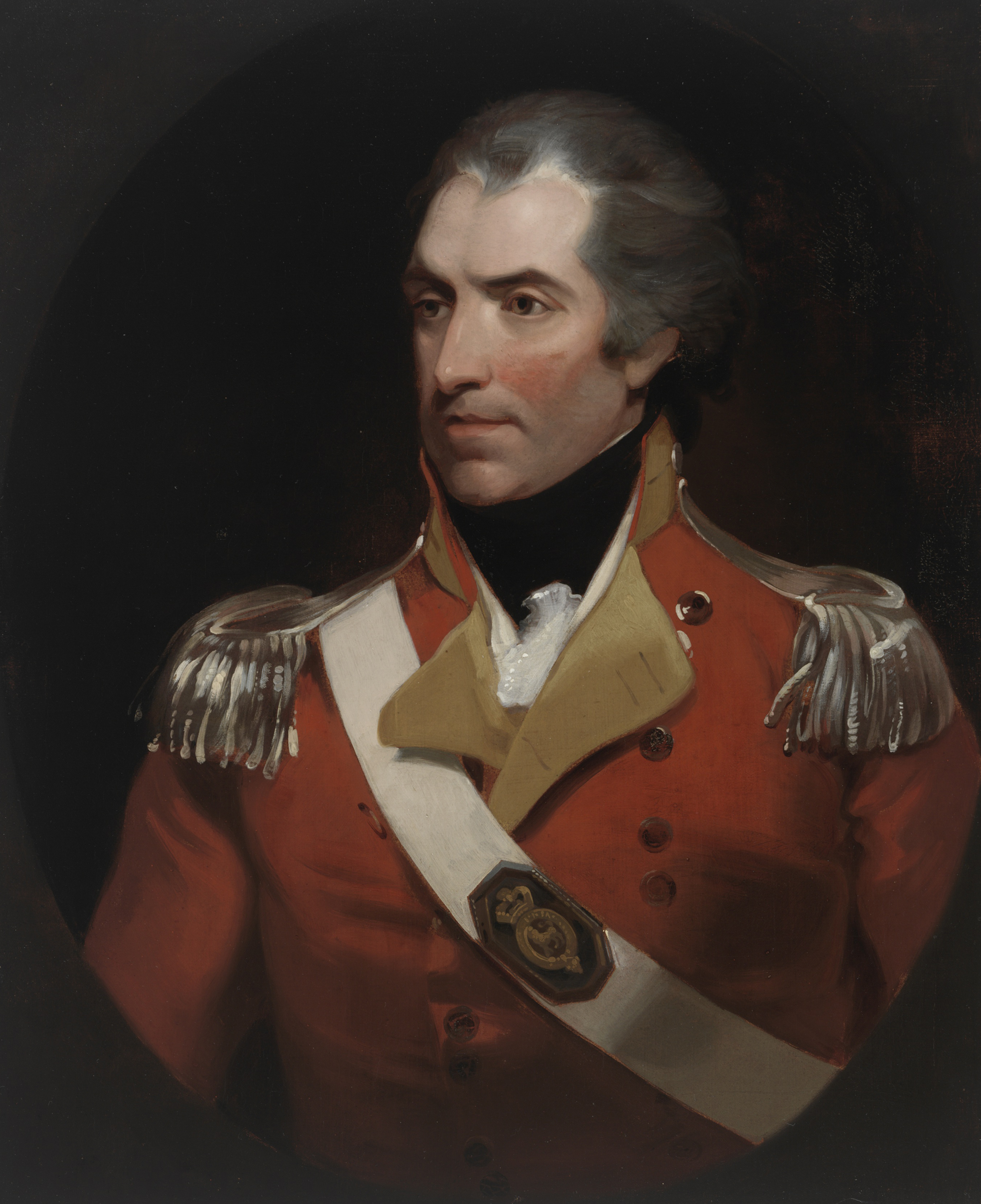
No.	Commandant at Port Dalrymple	From	To
1	Colonel William Paterson	1804	1808
2	Captain John Brabyn	1808	1810
3	Major George Alexander Gordon	1810	1812
4	Captain John Ritchie	1812	1812

== List of governors of Tasmania ==
=== Lieutenant-governors ===
The colony was called Van Diemen's Land until 1856.

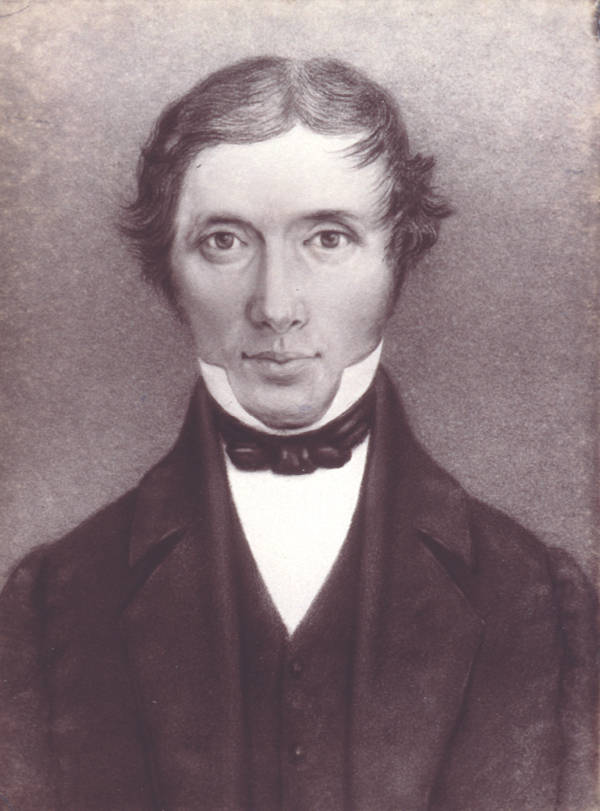
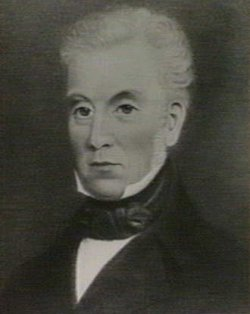
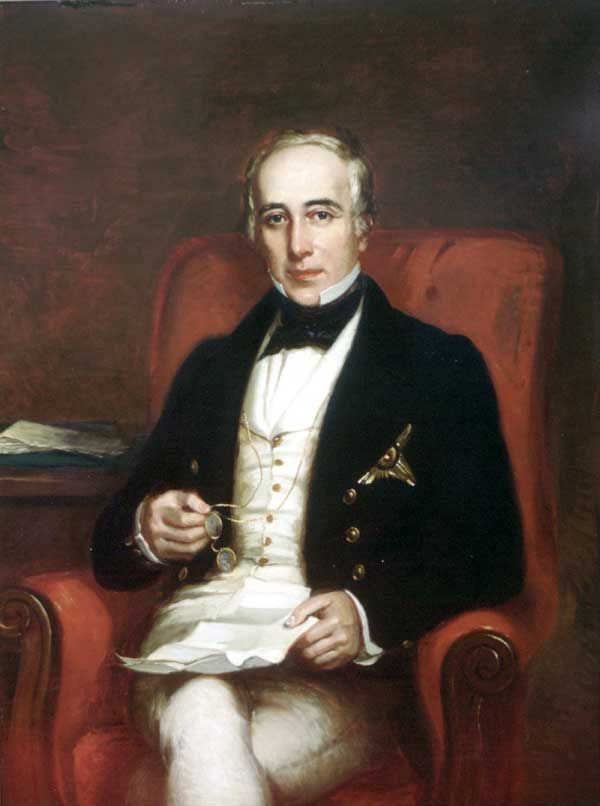
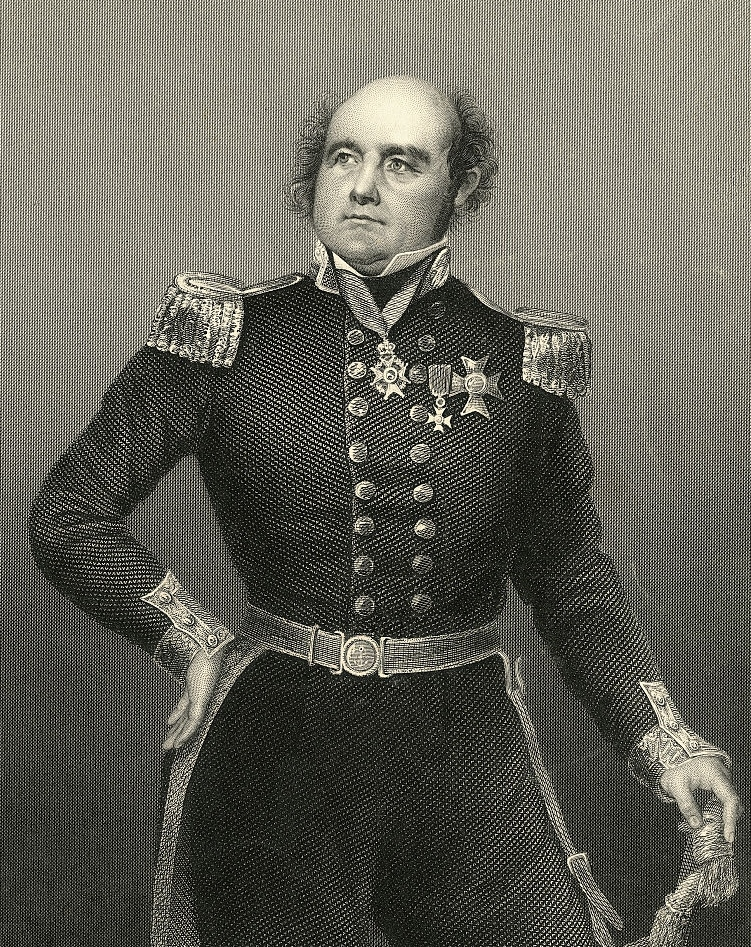
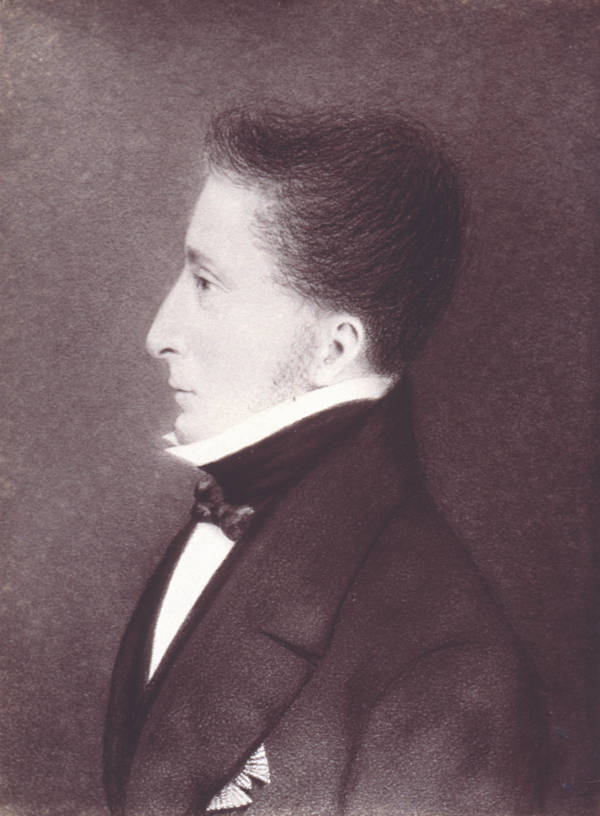
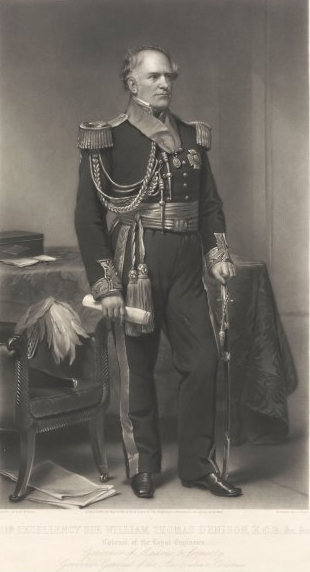
No.	Lieutenant-governor	From	To
1	Colonel Thomas Davey	4 February 1813	9 March 1817
2	Colonel William Sorell	9 March 1817	14 May 1824
3	Sir George Arthur	14 May 1824	29 October 1836
4	Sir John Franklin	5 January 1837	21 August 1843
5	Sir John Eardley-Wilmot, 1st Baronet	21 August 1843	13 October 1846
6	Sir William Denison	25 January 1847	8 January 1855

=== Governor-in-chief ===
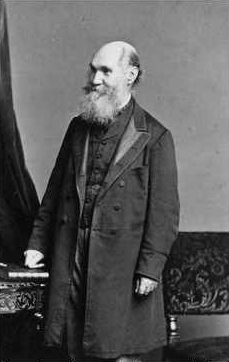
No.	Governor	From	To
1	Sir Henry Young	8 January 1855	10 December 1861

=== Governors ===
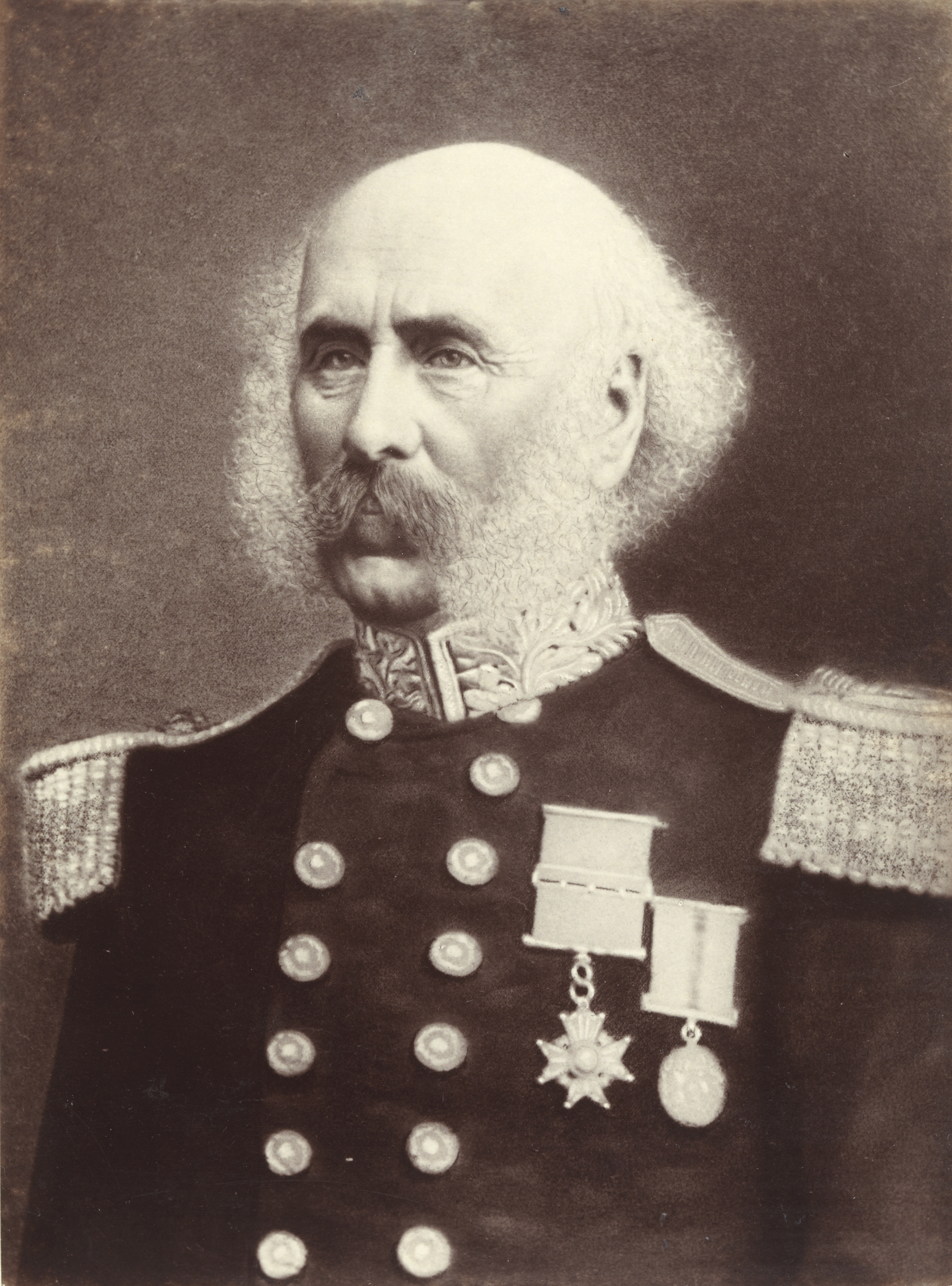
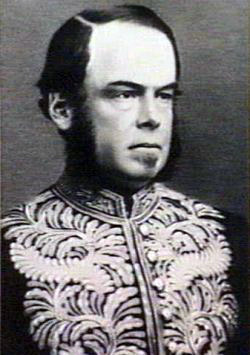
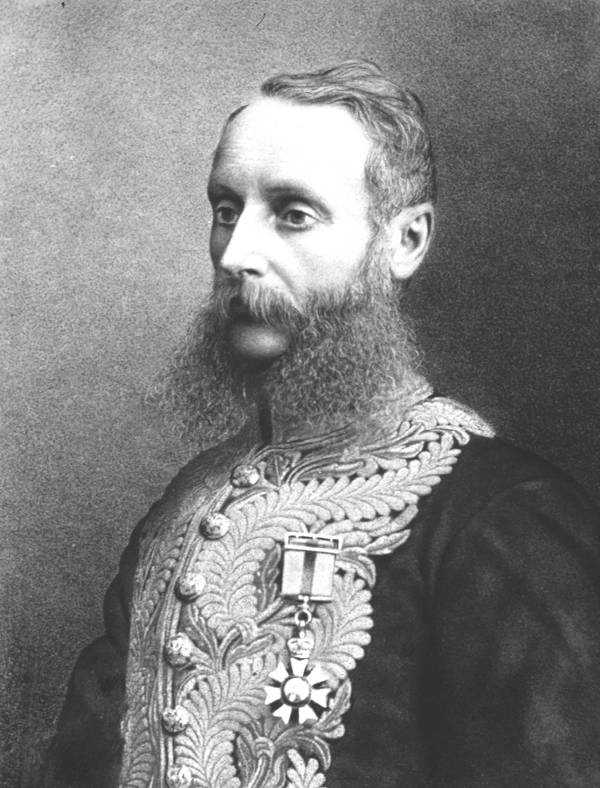
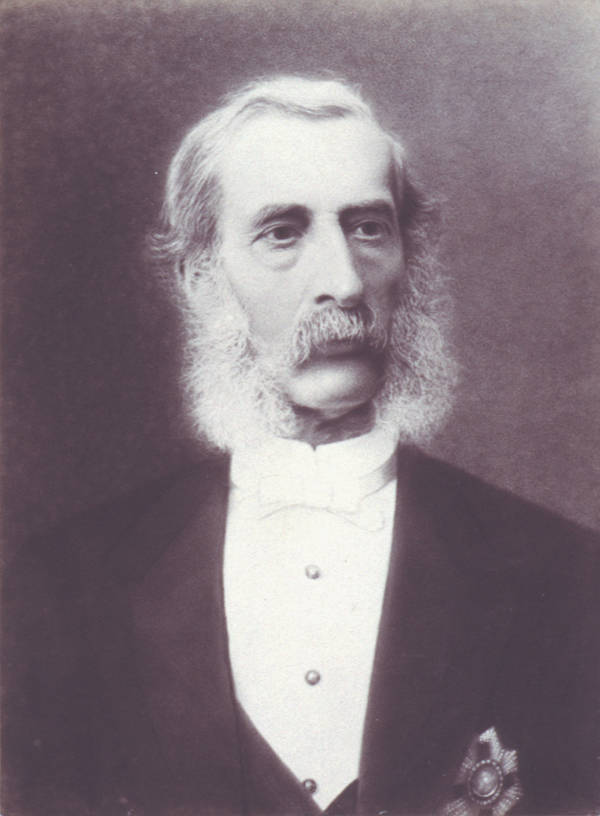
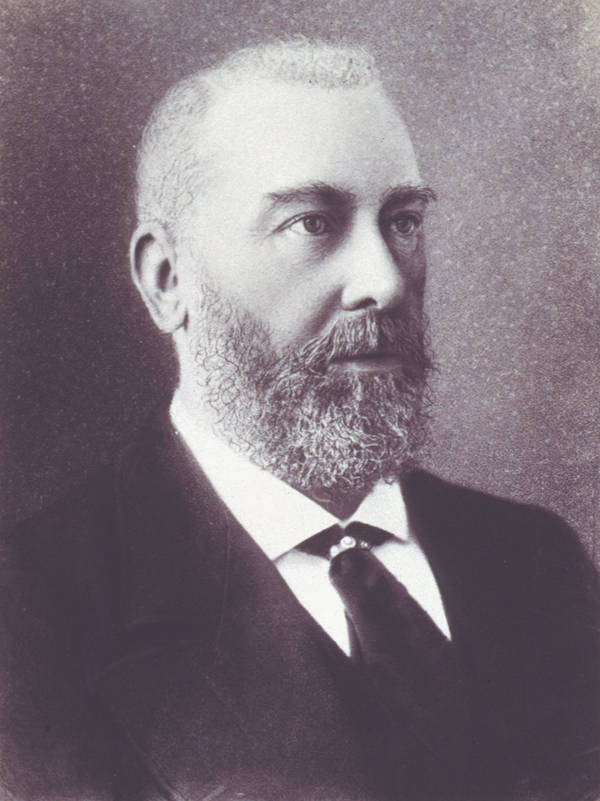
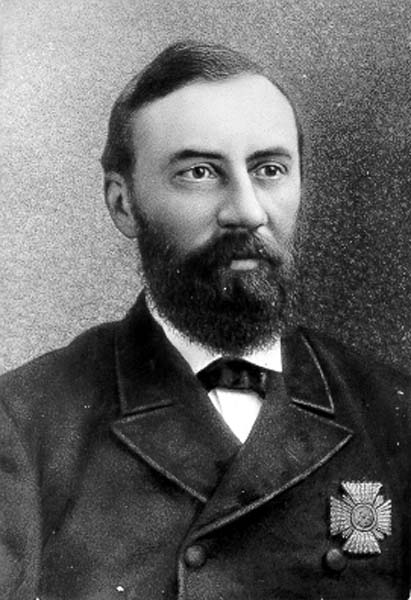
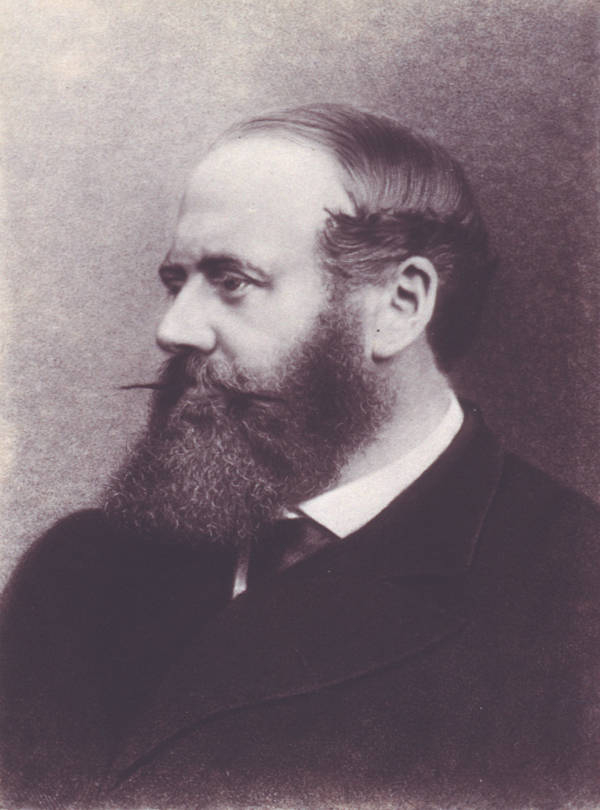
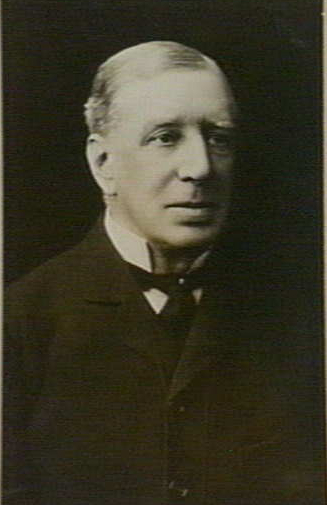
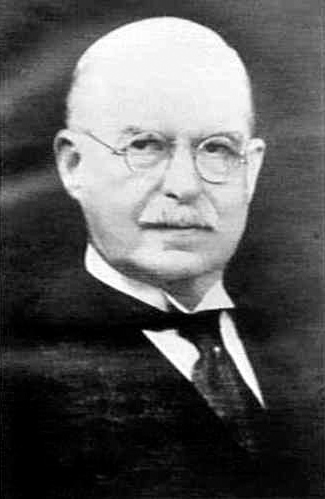
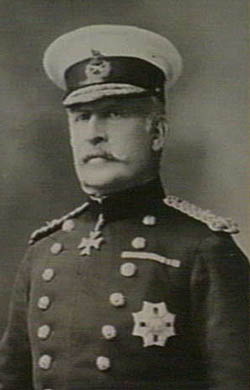
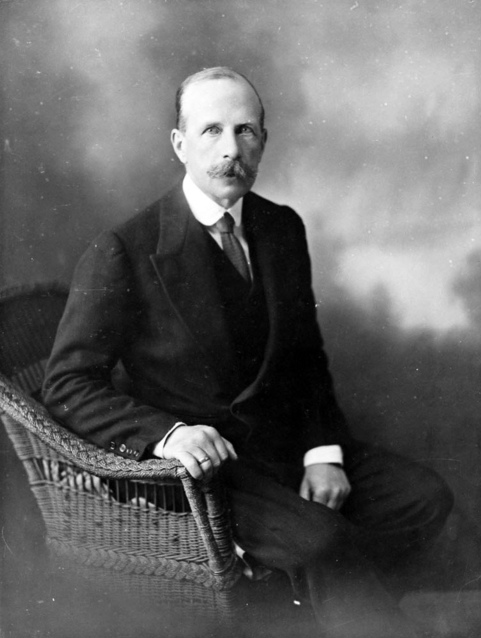
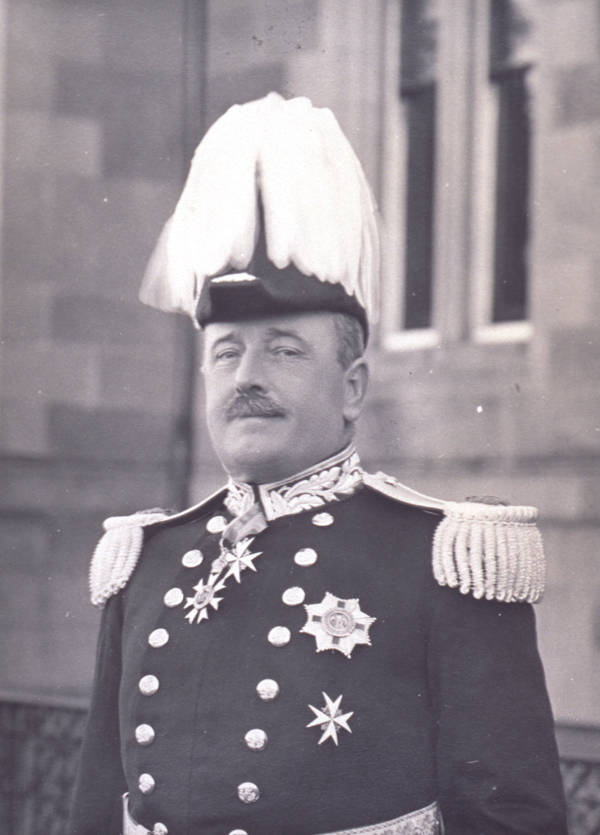
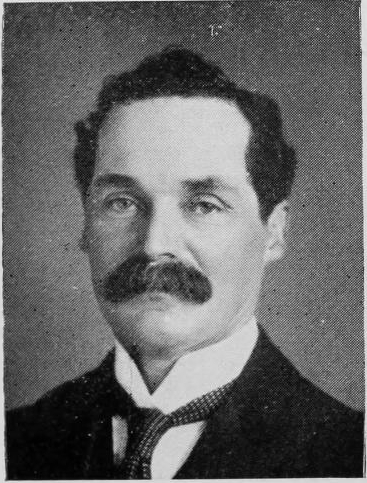
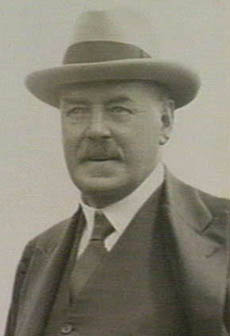
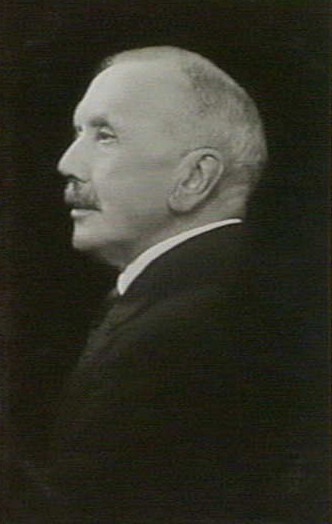
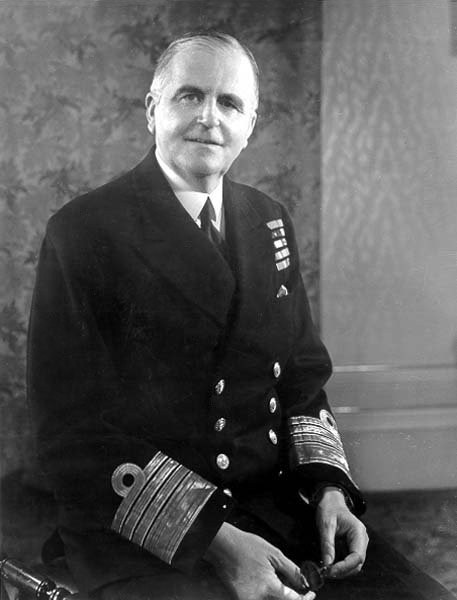
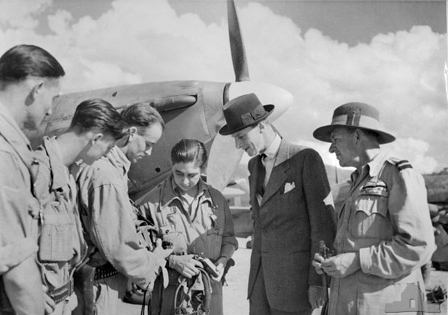
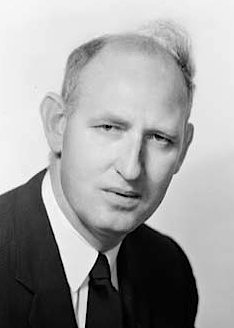
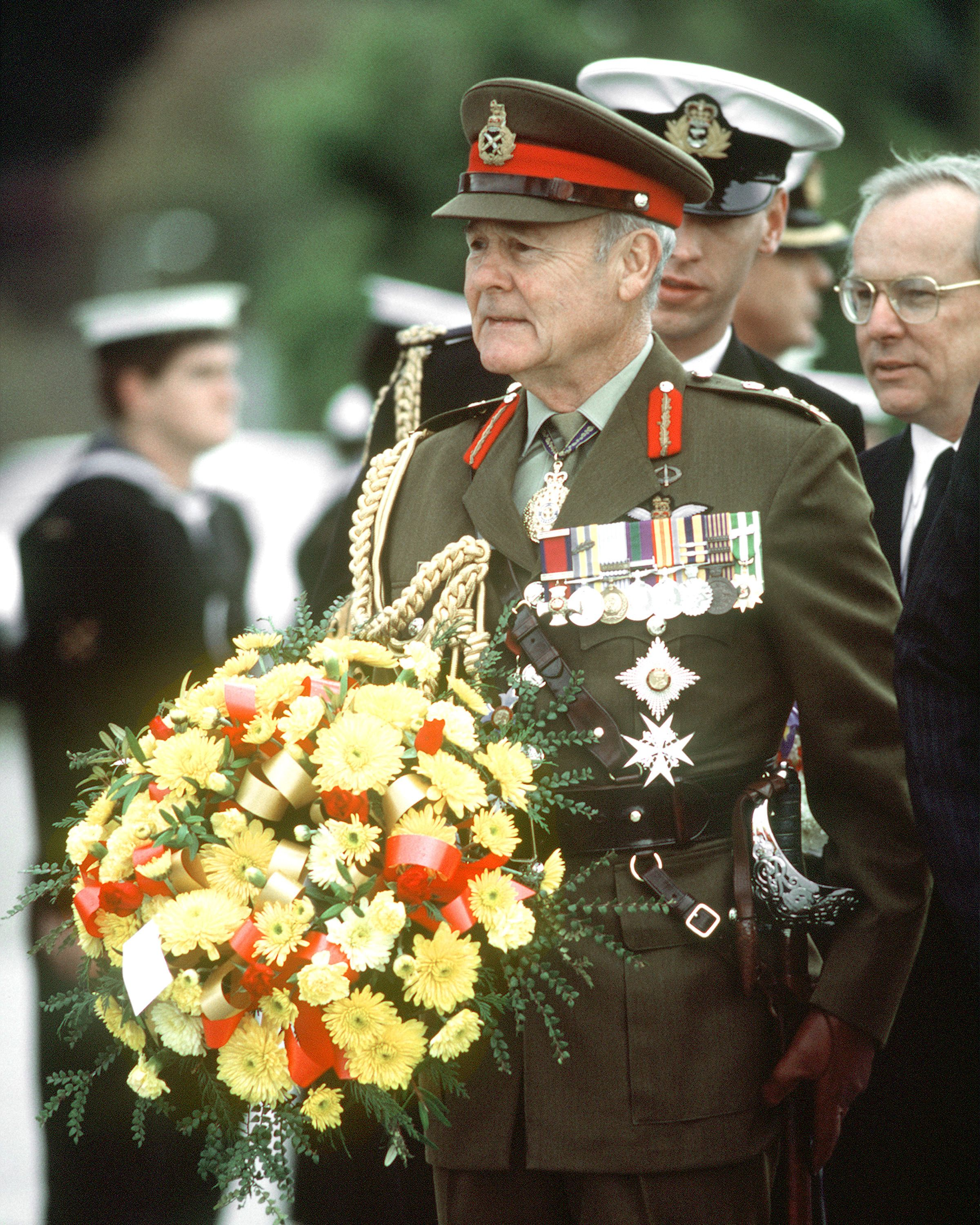
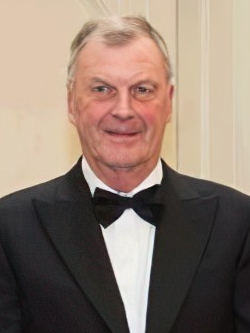
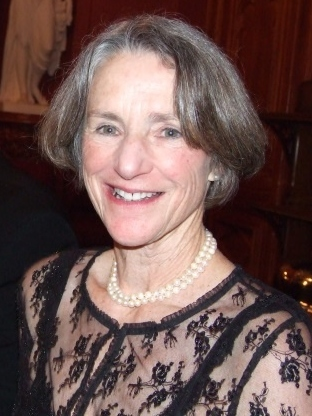
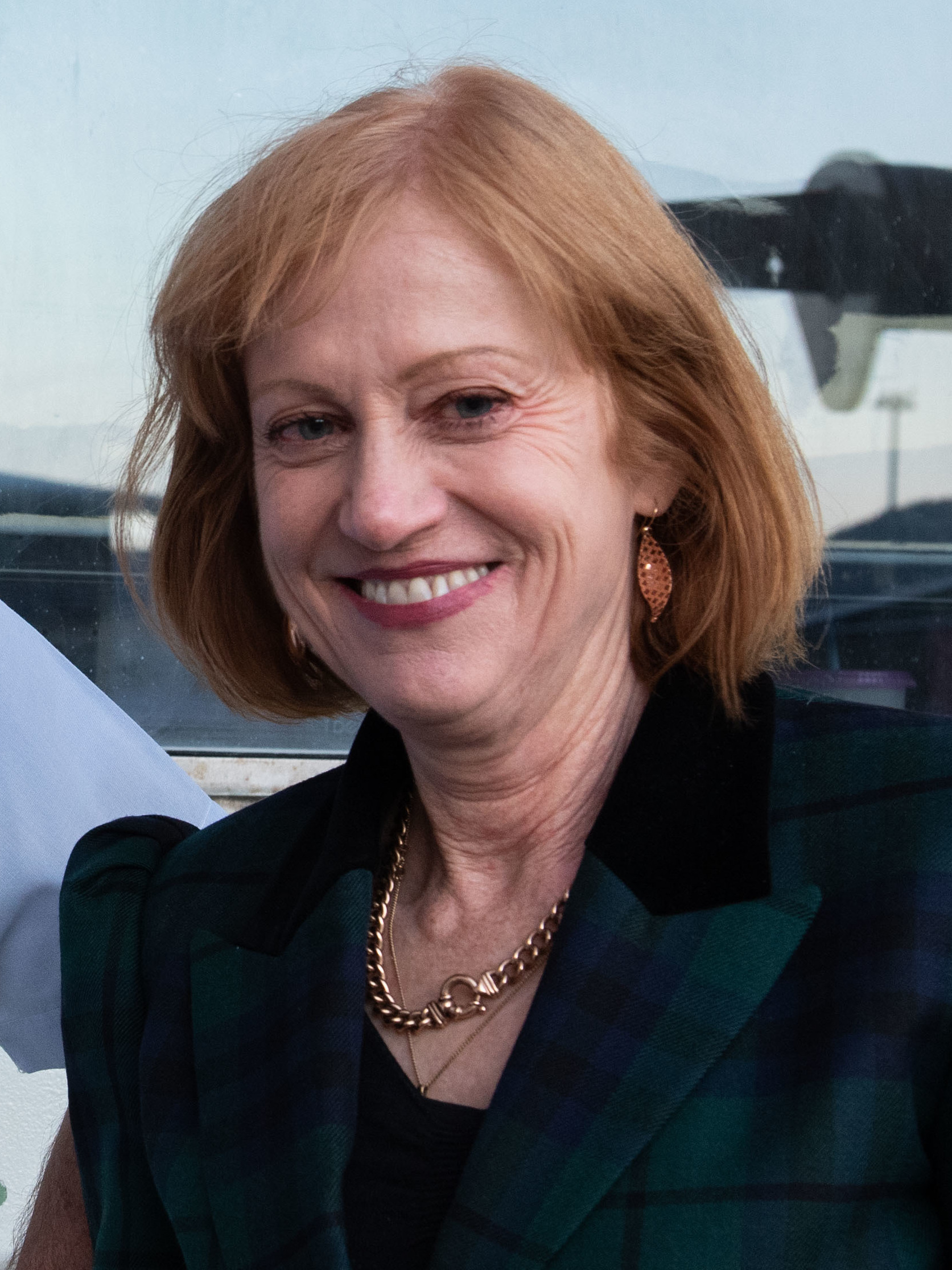
No.	Governor	From	To
1	Colonel Sir Thomas Browne	11 December 1862	30 December 1868
2	Sir Charles Du Cane	15 January 1869	30 November 1874
3	Sir Frederick Weld	13 January 1875	5 April 1880
4	Sir John Henry Lefroy (acting)	21 October 1880	7 December 1881
5	Major Sir George Strahan	7 December 1881	28 October 1886
6	Sir Robert Hamilton	11 March 1887	30 November 1892
7	Jenico Preston, 14th Viscount Gormanston	8 August 1893	14 August 1900
8	Captain Sir Arthur Havelock	8 November 1901	16 April 1904
9	Sir Gerald Strickland	28 October 1904	20 May 1909
10	Major-General Sir Harry Barron	16 September 1909	3 March 1913
11	Sir William Ellison-Macartney	4 June 1913	31 March 1917
12	Sir Francis Newdegate	30 March 1917	22 February 1920
13	Sir William Allardyce	16 April 1920	27 January 1922
14	Sir James O'Grady	23 December 1924	23 December 1930
15	Sir Ernest Clark	4 August 1933	4 August 1945
16	Admiral Sir Hugh Binney	24 December 1945	8 May 1951
17	Sir Ronald Cross, 1st Baronet	22 August 1951	4 June 1958
18	Thomas Corbett, 2nd Baron Rowallan	21 October 1959	25 March 1963
19	Lieutenant-General Sir Charles Gairdner	24 September 1963	11 July 1968
20	Lieutenant-General Sir Edric Bastyan	2 December 1968	1 December 1973
21	Sir Stanley Burbury	5 December 1973	1 October 1982
22	Sir James Plimsoll	1 October 1982	8 May 1987
23	General Sir Phillip Bennett	19 October 1987	2 October 1995
24	Sir Guy Green	2 October 1995	3 October 2003
25	Richard Butler	3 October 2003	9 August 2004
26	William Cox	15 December 2004	2 April 2008
27	Peter Underwood	2 April 2008	7 July 2014
28	Professor Kate Warner	10 December 2014	9 June 2021
29	Barbara Baker	16 June 2021	15 June 2026
30	Caroline Wells	17 June 2026	Incumbent

== Sources ==
- Governors and Lieutenant Governors of Tasmania
- Parliamentary Library – Governors of Tasmania
