= List of University of Bristol people =

This is a list of University of Bristol people, including a brief description of their notability. This list includes not just former students but persons who are or have been associated with the university, including former academics, Chancellors, and recipients of honorary degrees.

== Staff and academics ==
- Mike Ashfold, Emeritus Professor of Chemistry
- Sir Michael Berry, physicist and Royal Society Research Professor
- Michael Benton Professor of Vertebrate Palaeontology
- Robert Bickers, Professor of History
- Selig Brodetsky (1888–1954), mathematician, President of the Hebrew University of Jerusalem
- Henry Chilver, Baron Chilver, engineer and Vice-Chancellor of Cranfield University
- Dave Cliff, computer scientist
- Beryl May Dent, mathematical physicist
- Philip Donoghue, professor of palaeobiology
- Stephen Eichhorn, materials scientist
- Esther Eidinow, professor of ancient history
- Tim Elliott, professor of isotope geochemistry
- Peter Flach, computer scientist
- Mike Fraser, Professor of Human-computer interaction
- Jean Golding, Emeritus Professor of Paediatric and Perinatal Epidemiology
- Simon Hall, chemist
- Christopher Hawkesworth, Professor of Isotope Geochemistry
- Mark Horton, Senior Teaching Fellow, British maritime and historical archaeologist
- Ronald Hutton, historian
- Richard Huxtable, Professor of Medical Ethics and Law
- Katharine Cashman, Professor of Volcanology
- Ursula King, Professor Emeritus of Theology and Religious Studies
- Martin Kuball, Professor of Physics, Director of Centre for Device Thermography and Reliability
- David May, Professor of Computer Science
- Nevill Mott, Nobel laureate, Physics
- Jeremy O'Brien, physicist
- Sandu Popescu, Professor of Physics
- Cecil Frank Powell, Nobel laureate, Physics
- Sir William Ramsay, Nobel laureate, Chemistry
- John Rarity, Professor of Optical Communication Systems
- Nigel Smart, cryptographer
- Samir Okasha, philosopher
- Winifred Shapland, first Registrar of a British University

== Alumni ==
=== Government and politics ===
==== United Kingdom ====
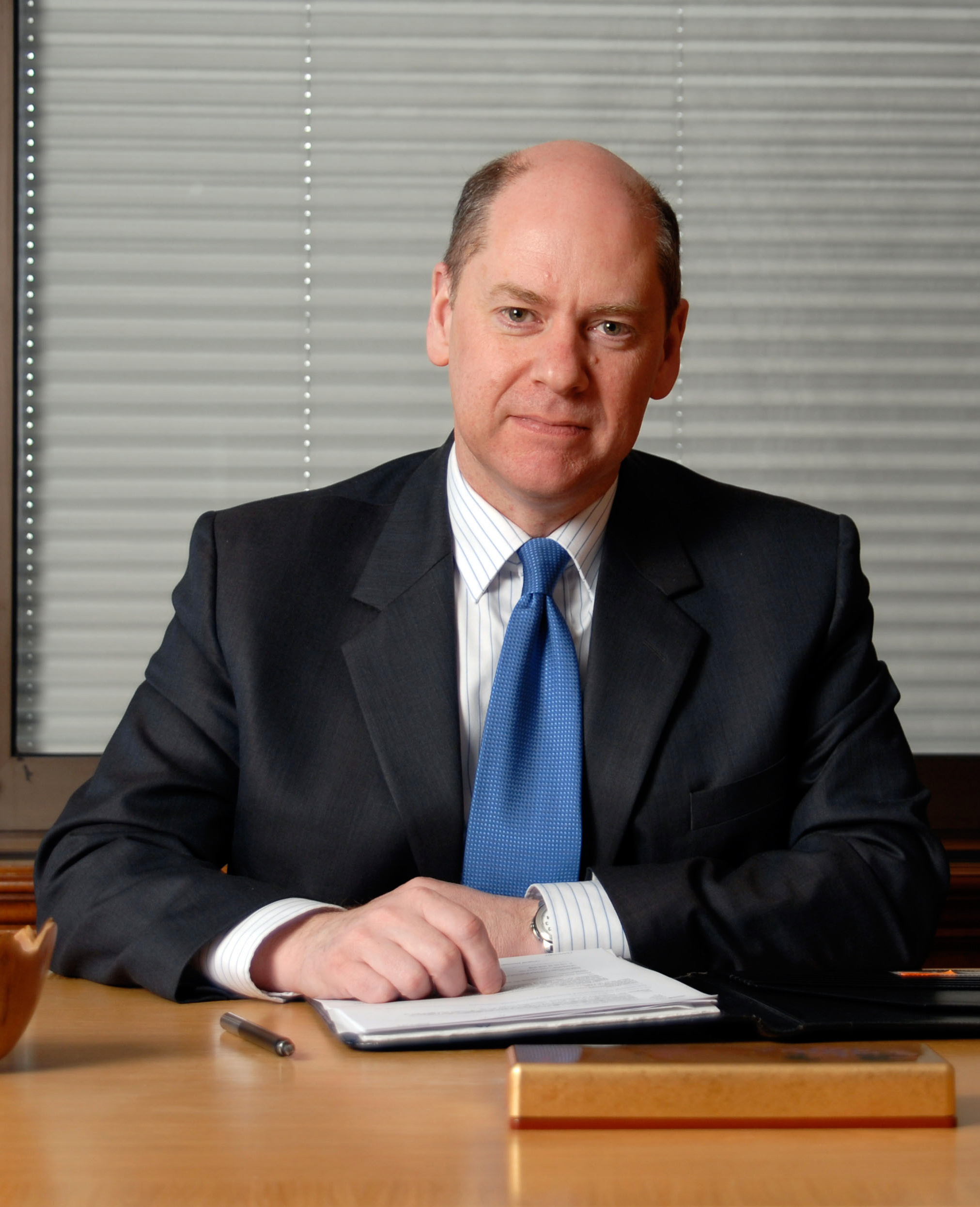
Jonathan Evans, former Head of MI5

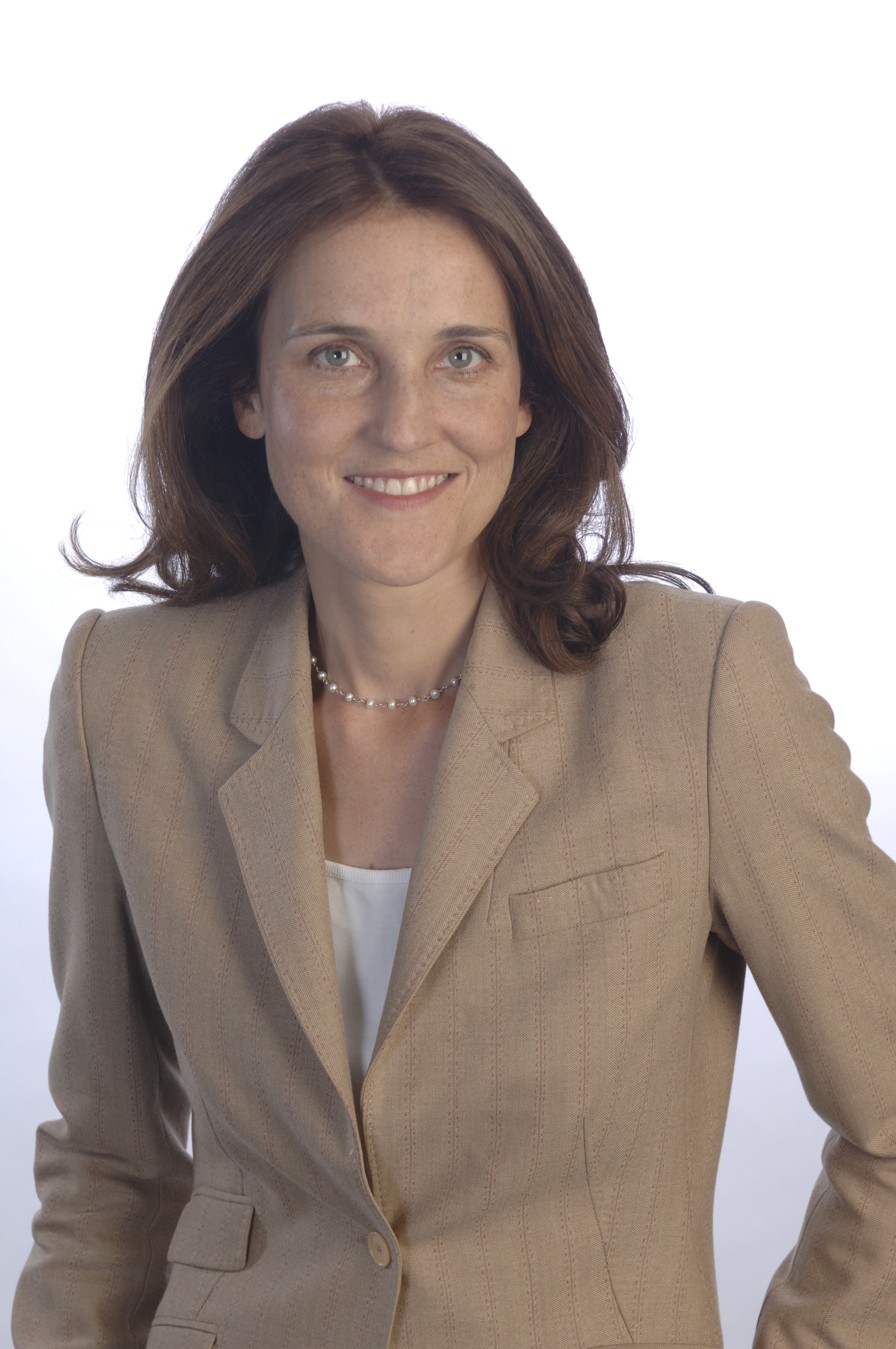
Theresa Villiers, Conservative MP

- Joyce Anelay, Baroness Anelay of St Johns, Minister of State at the Department for Exiting the European Union, Government's Chief Whip (2010-2014)
- John Biggs, British Labour and Co-operative Party politician and the current Mayor of Tower Hamlets
- Paul Boateng, Former Labour MP
- Charles Bowman, 690th Lord Mayor of the City of London
- Carolyn Browne, British Ambassador to Kazakhstan, former British Ambassador to Azerbaijan
- Jaya Chakrabarti, British data scientist, CEO, and public figure
- Sir Winston Churchill, British politician and two times Prime Minister (Chancellor of the university)
- Derek Clark, Former UKIP MEP
- Michael Cocks, Former Labour Chief Whip; life peer
- Kathryn Colvin, British Diplomat
- Stephen Crabb, Conservative MP
- Thangam Debbonaire, Labour MP
- Sir Liam Donaldson, Former Chief Medical Officer of the United Kingdom Government
- Sir Peter Estlin, 691st Lord Mayor of London
- Sir Jonathan Evans, Head of MI5
- George Ferguson, British politician, first elected Mayor of Bristol
- Paul Flowers, English politician, former Labour councillor in Rochdale, Non-executive chairman of The Co-operative Bank
- Mark Francois, Conservative MP
- David Hunt, Baron Hunt of the Wirral. Conservative politician and cabinet minister
- Susan Elan Jones, former Labour MP
- David Kidney, former Labour MP
- Bob Marshall-Andrews, former Labour MP
- Stephen Morgan, Labour MP
- Andrew Murrison, Conservative MP
- Sheila Noakes, Baroness Noakes, Conservative politician, life peer; former corporate executive
- Lembit Öpik, former Liberal Democrat MP
- Andrew Patrick, British High Commissioner to Sri Lanka, former British Ambassador to Myanmar
- Polly Payne, Joint Chief Executive of the Office for Students
- Dan Poulter, Labour MP
- Dawn Primarolo, former Labour MP
- Vivien Stern, Baroness Stern, politician, life peer
- Tom Tugendhat, Conservative MP
- Theresa Villiers, Conservative MP; Secretary of State for Northern Ireland
- Stephen Williams, former Liberal Democrat MP
- Chris Woodhead, columnist; former Chief Inspector of Schools

==== International ====
- Hun Manet, Prime Minister of Cambodia and Vice-President of the Cambodian People's Party
- Anna Maria Anders, Former Ambassador of the Republic of Poland to Italy
- Gaositwe K.T. Chiepe, Former Minister for Foreign Affairs of Botswana
- Nkosazana Dlamini-Zuma, Minister of Foreign Affairs of South Africa
- Manuel Esquivel, former Prime Minister of Belize
- Letsie III of Lesotho, King of Lesotho
- Dame Pearlette Louisy, Governor General of St.Lucia
- Danny Montano, President of the Senate of Trinidad and Tobago
- Joseph Muscat, former Prime Minister of Malta
- George W. Odlum, Minister of Foreign Affairs of St. Lucia
- Patrick Kwame Kusi Quaidoo, Member of the Ghana Parliament
- Robert Victor Evan Wong, Member of British Guiana Executive and Legislative Councils; businessman; rancher
- Kai Whittaker, member of the German Parliament
- Alvin Yeung, Member of Hong Kong Legislative Council

=== The Law ===
- Alexander Cameron, English Barrister
- Eve Cornwell, YouTuber and former lawyer
- Sir Richard Field, English High Court Judge, Academic of University of British Columbia, University of Hong Kong, McGill University
- Louisa Ghevaert, British family law lawyer
- Brenda Hale, Baroness Hale of Richmond, English judge and first woman to be appointed as the President of the Supreme Court of the United Kingdom, Chancellor of university (2004–2016)
- Sir Stephen Laws, British lawyer and civil servant who served as the First Parliamentary Counsel (2006–2012)
- Victoria Sharp, English Lady Justice of Appeal and Vice-President of the Queen's Bench Division
- Kathryn Thirlwall, English Lady Justice of Appeal and Deputy Senior Presiding Judge

=== Academia ===
- Percy Anstey, economist
- Janette Atkinson, psychologist and academic
- Dame Glynis Breakwell, psychologist, Vice-Chancellor of the University of Bath
- Linda Colley, British historian, currently at Princeton University
- Robin Dunbar, anthropologist and evolutionary psychologist, Professor of Experimental Psychology at the University of Oxford
- Adrian Franklin, Professor of Sociology, University of Tasmania
- Dame Julia Goodfellow, Vice-Chancellor of the University of Kent
- Elaine Graham, Professor of Social and Pastoral Theology, University of Manchester
- Brian Hayden, Professor of Physical Chemistry within Chemistry at the University of Southampton
- Irving Hexham, Professor of Religious Studies, University of Calgary
- Syed Hamid Hussain, Professor of Chemistry at Bacha Khan University
- Bill MacMillan, Vice-Chancellor of the University of East Anglia
- David Maguire, Vice-Chancellor of the University of East Anglia
- Michael McClelland, Professor of Microbiology and Genetics at the University of California, Irvine
- Stephen McKay, academic and Professor of Social Research at the University of Lincoln
- John Metcalf, editor of Canadian Notes and Queries
- David Miller, Professor of Political Sociology; employment terminated October 2021
- Nancy Millis, Chancellor of La Trobe University, Australia
- Eliahu Nissim (born 1933), Israeli Professor of Aeronautical Engineering; President of the Open University of Israel
- Charles Wang Wai Ng, civil engineer and academic, Hong Kong University of Science and Technology
- David William Rhind, Vice-Chancellor of City University, London
- Brian Rotman, author (with G. T. Kneebone) of Theory of Sets and Transfinite Numbers
- George Stanley Rushbrooke, Theoretical physicist
- Ian Shapiro, Sterling Professor of Political Science, Yale University
- Marcantonio M. Spada, Emeritus Professor of Addictive Behaviours and Mental Health, London South Bank University
- Alastair Summerlee, President of the University of Guelph, Canada
- Richard Sykes, Rector of Imperial College; formerly Chairman of GlaxoSmithKline
- Paul Thompson, Chair of the British Council

=== Literature ===
- Nicky Arscott, poet
- Joan Barton, poet
- Jamie Bulloch, translator
- Angela Carter, author
- Julia Donaldson, author
- Elena Forbes, novelist
- David Gibbins, author
- David Greig, playwright
- Sarah Kane, playwright
- Laura Wade, playwright
- Joanna Kavenna, novelist
- Andrew Karpati Kennedy, author and literary critic
- Dick King-Smith, author
- J. M. G. Le Clézio, Nobel laureate, author
- Kate Long, author
- Duncan McNair, author
- Deborah Moggach, author
- Julie Myerson, novelist
- David Nicholls, novelist, screenwriter
- Alex Norris author, cartoonist
- Harold Pinter, Nobel laureate, playwright
- Mark Ravenhill, playwright
- Arnold Ridley, playwright
- Mary Watson, author

=== Economics and business ===
- Andrew Stewart Mackenzie, CEO of BHP Billiton
- Alison Cooper, CEO of Imperial Tobacco
- Ben Elliot, founder of Quintessentially
- Sahar Hashemi, founded Coffee Republic
- Emma Ingilby, Lady Ingilby, businesswoman and co-owner of Ripley Castle
- John James, businessman and philanthropist
- Ruth Lea, Baroness Lea of Lymm, economist
- Alfred Marshall, Noted Economist & Real Architect of Micro-Economics
- Stephen Page, CEO of Faber and Faber
- Nazir Razak, Chairman of CIMB Group
- Sinan Mohammed Rida al-Shibibi

=== Journalism ===
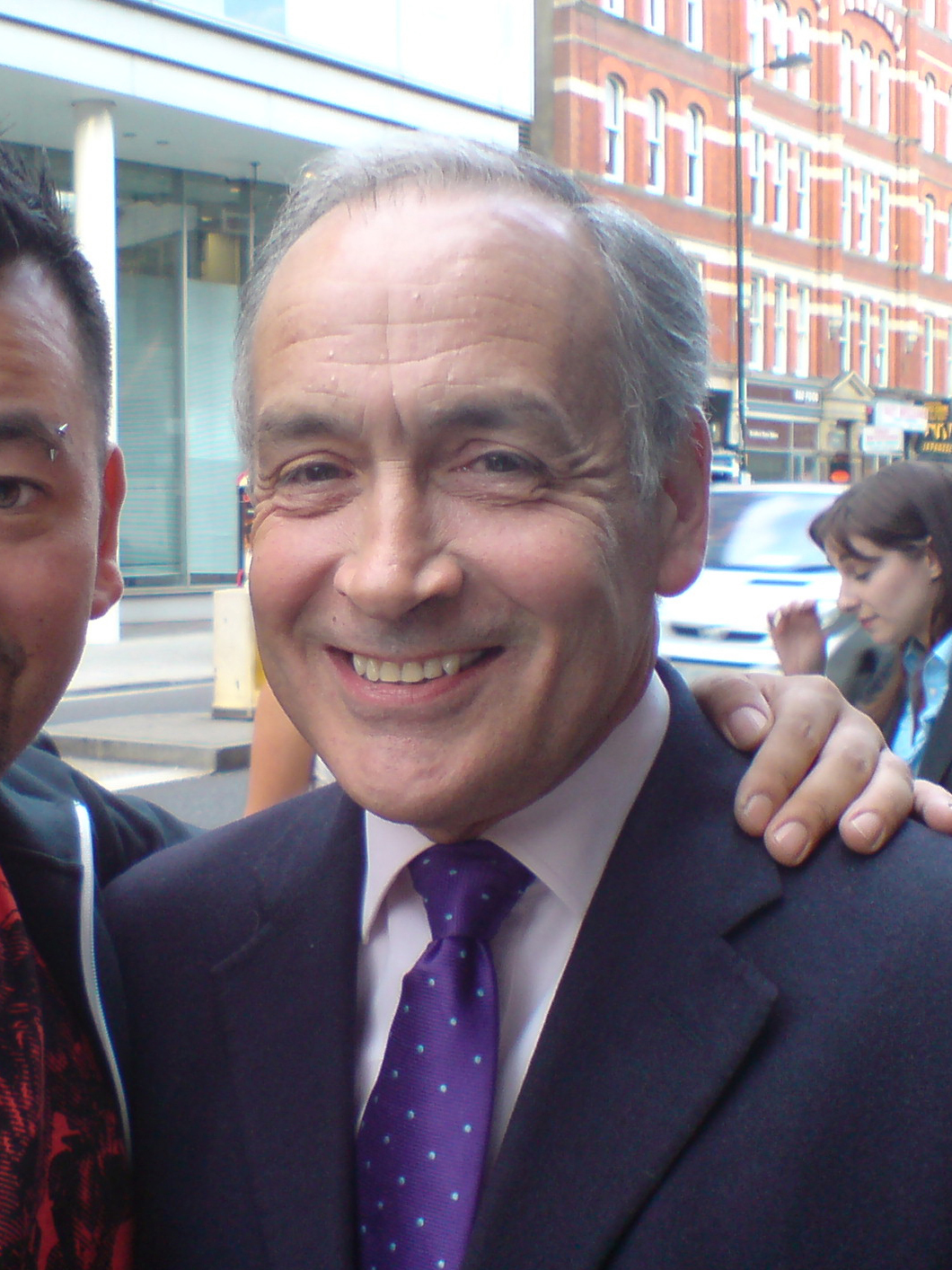
Alastair Stewart, TV journalist

- Katya Adler, BBC journalist
- Craig Brown, journalist, humorous author
- Michael Cox, sports journalist
- Tony Gallagher, Editor-in-chief of The Sun. Formerly editor at The Daily Telegraph and joint deputy editor of the Daily Mail
- Kate Gerbeau, television journalist
- Misha Glenny, newspaper journalist; BBC radio journalist
- Nik Gowing, BBC News anchor
- Will Hutton, newspaper columnist; former Editor-in-Chief of The Observer
- James Landale, BBC journalist; founder of Bristol's student newspaper Epigram
- Peter Thal Larsen, Global Editor, Reuters Breakingviews
- William Lewis, journalist; Editor of The Daily Telegraph
- Jemima Khan, journalist
- Sheena McDonald, television journalist
- Lucrezia Millarini, journalist and newscaster for ITV News
- Sarah Montague, presenter of the Today programme
- Krissi Murison, deputy editor of The Sunday Times, former editor, NME
- Susanna Reid, television journalist
- Caroline St John-Brooks, newspaper journalist
- Alastair Stewart, television journalist
- Dominic Waghorn, television journalist
- Julie Welch, sports journalist, screenwriter
- Jim White, newspaper journalist

=== Science ===
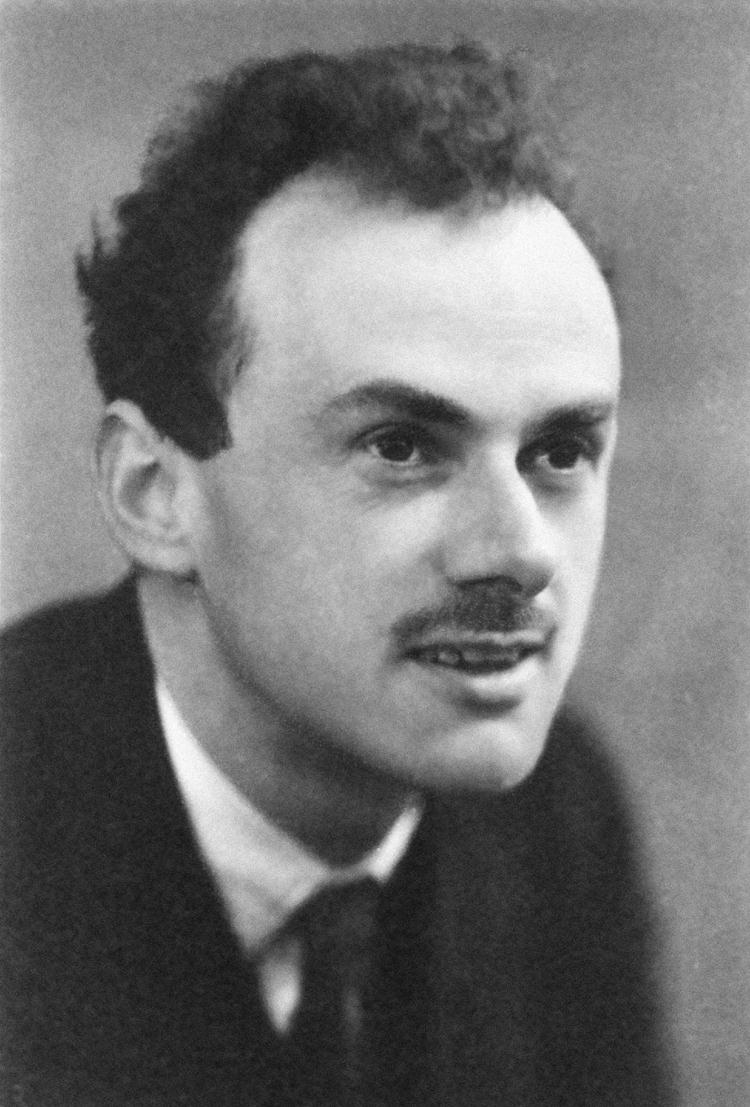
Paul Dirac, one of the founders of quantum mechanics

- Tom Avery, explorer
- David Bohm, physicist
- Philip Campbell, editor-in-chief, Nature
- Henry Chilver, Baron Chilver, engineer and Vice-Chancellor of Cranfield University
- Max Delbrück, Nobel laureate, Medicine
- Keith Devlin, logician
- Paul Dirac, Nobel laureate, Physics
- Peter Dunn, paediatrician
- Klaus Fuchs, physicist; Soviet spy
- Suzi Gage, psychologist, science blogger
- Kun Huang, physicist
- Judith Kingston, paediatrician
- Rob Leslie-Carter, engineer
- Chris MacMahon, mechanical engineer
- Jenny Nelson, Professor of Physics at Imperial College London
- Michael O'Keeffe, Nobel laureate, Chemistry
- Debby Reynolds, Chief Veterinary Officer for the UK
- Dame Julia Slingo, Chief Scientist at the Met Office
- Millicent Taylor, chemist who petitioned the Chemical Society
- Geoffrey Tovey, serologist who founded the UK Transplant service
- Linda Tyfield, clinical scientist and Fellow of the Royal College of Pathologists
- James Barrington-Brown, aerospace engineer and founder of NewSpace Systems
- Greet Van den Berghe, Dutch physician and intensive care researcher.

=== TV, film, radio and theatre ===
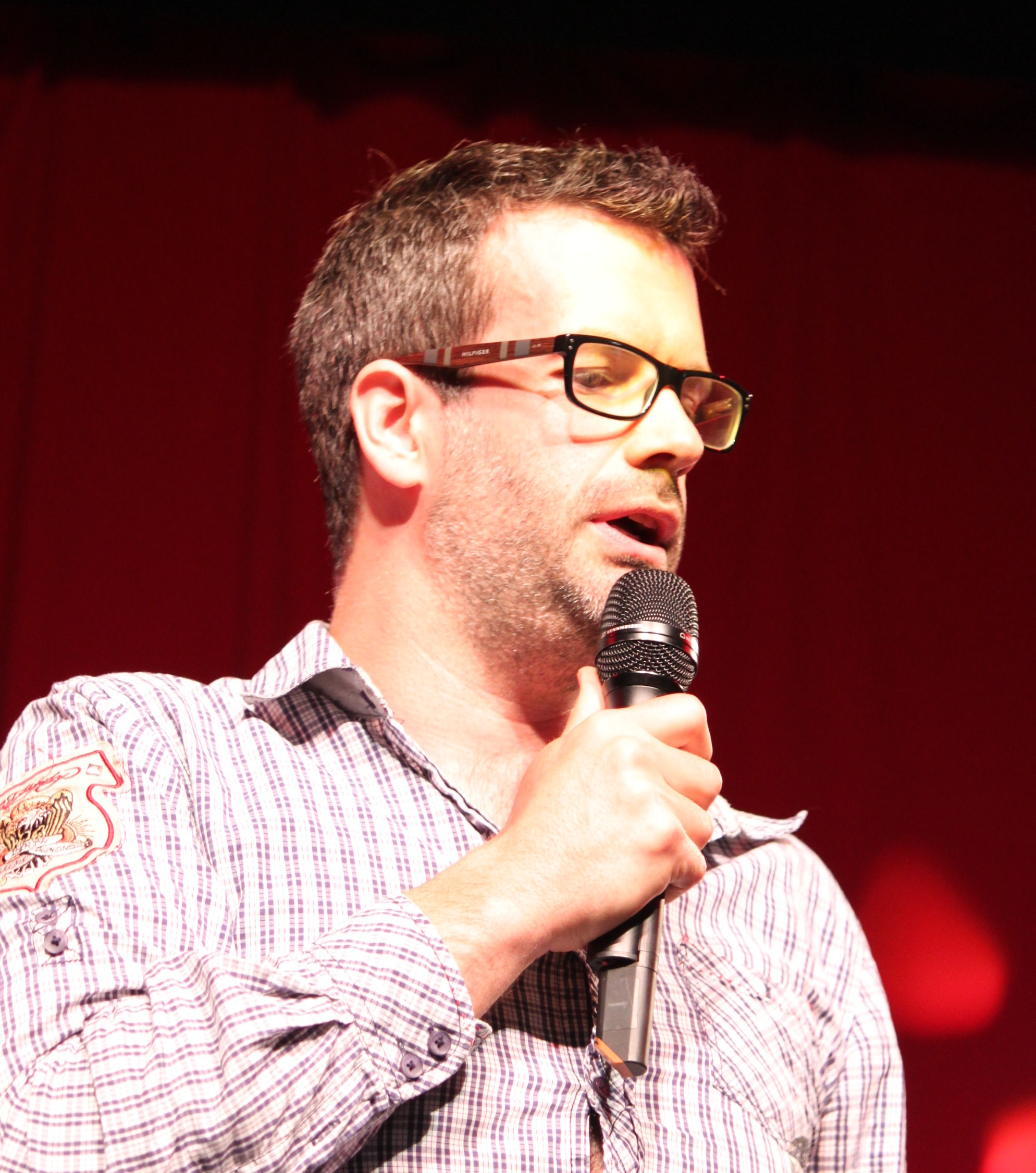
Marcus Brigstocke, comedian and satirist

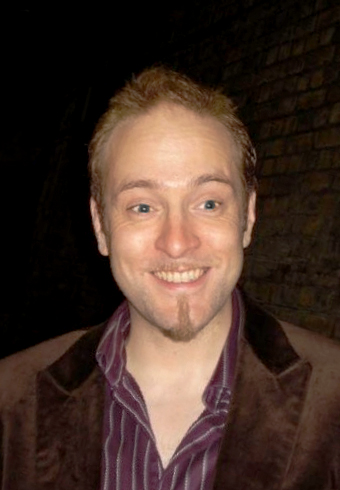
Derren Brown, illusionist

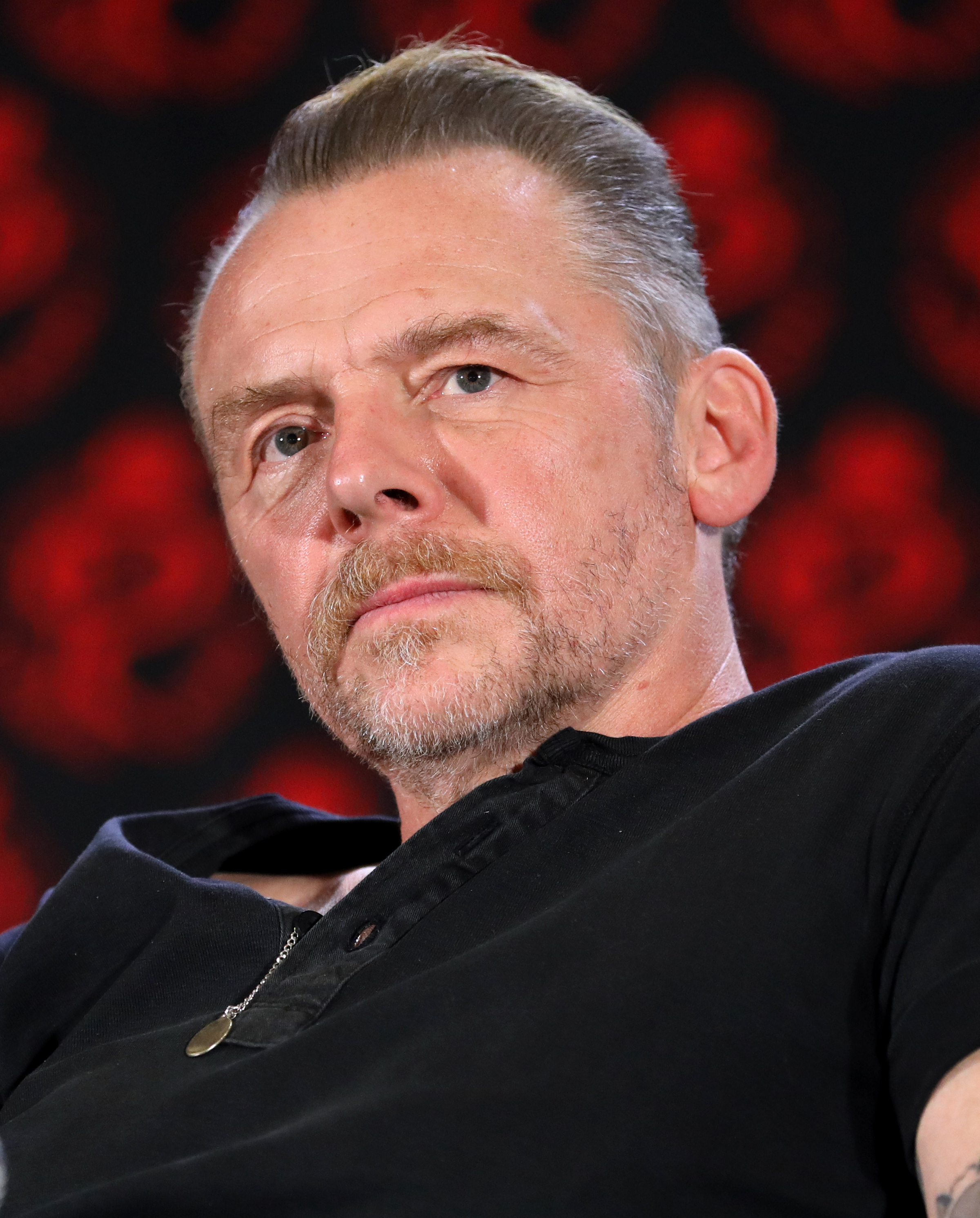
Simon Pegg, actor and writer

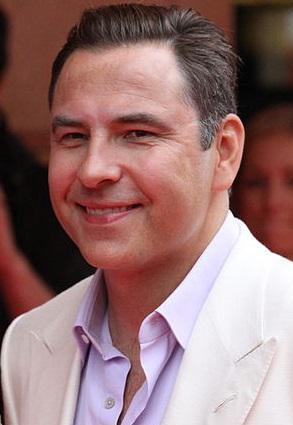
David Walliams, comedian
- Joe Alwyn, actor
- Joe Armstrong, actor
- Charlotte Attenborough, actress
- David Bamber, actor
- Marcus Brigstocke, comedian
- Jeremy Brock, actor, director
- Derren Brown, psychological illusionist
- Pippa Cleary, West End Composer and Lyricist
- Neil Cole, comedian, broadcaster
- Alex Cox, director
- Jamie Demetriou, comedian, actor and writer
- Natasia Demetriou, comedian, actress and writer
- Dominik Diamond, television presenter
- Gregory Doran, theatre director
- Graham Eatough, theatre director
- Kevin Elyot, playwright, screenwriter and actor
- Judy Finnigan, television presenter
- Emma Freud, broadcaster
- Gigguk, Youtuber
- Caroline Goodall, actress
- David Greig, playwright
- Julian Hector, former head of the BBC Natural History Unit
- Jason Isaacs, actor
- Philip Jackson, actor
- Sue Jones-Davies, actress, singer, politician
- Chris Langham, comedian
- Sue Lawley, television presenter
- Steve Leonard, television veterinarian/presenter
- Matt Lucas, comedian
- Pearl Mackie, actress
- Maddie Moate, BAFTA-winning television presenter
- Charlotte Moore, television executive
- Chris Morris, comedian, satirist
- Iain Morris, comedy writer
- Simon Pegg, comedy writer, actor
- Tim Pigott-Smith, actor
- Simon Pusey, entrepreneur and television presenter
- David Rappaport, actor
- Mark Ravenhill, playwright
- Advolly Richmond, television presenter
- Arnold Ridley, actor and playwright
- Charlotte Ritchie, actress, singer
- Pennant Roberts, television director and producer
- Andrew Ruhemann, founder of double Academy Award-winning Passion Pictures
- Fin Taylor, comedian
- Luke Thompson, actor
- Charlotte Uhlenbroek, television presenter
- Paul Unwin, director, writer
- Laura Wade, playwright
- David Walliams, comedian
- Matthew Warchus, director
- Emily Watson, Oscar-nominated actress
- Peter Webber, film and television director and producer
- Michael Winterbottom, filmmaker
- Grace Wyndham Goldie, BBC producer and executive

=== Sports ===
- Dave Attwood, England rugby union player
- Kyran Bracken, England rugby union player
- Sara Campbell, freediver
- Megan Carter Davies, 2022 world champion in Orienteering
- Jean-Pierre Escalettes, President, French Football Federation
- Thady Gosden, racehorse trainer
- Alex King, rugby union player (ASM Clermont Auvergne)
- Josh Lewsey, England international in rugby union
- Jake Meyer, climber
- Iain Percy, double Olympic gold medalist, sailing
- David Tanner, performance director, British Rowing
- Ed Woodward, former CEO of Manchester United

=== Music ===
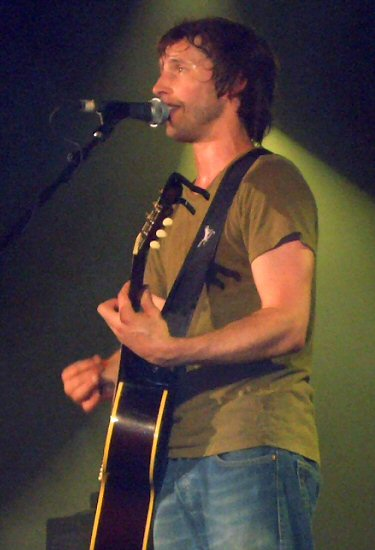
Musician James Blunt

- James Blunt, musician, singer-songwriter
- Kerensa Briggs, composer
- Hugh Cornwell, lead singer of The Stranglers
- Julian Grant, classical music composer
- Jamie Lidell, musician and soul singer, signed to Warp Records
- Will Todd, classical and jazz composer; jazz pianist
- Harriet Wheeler, musician, singer for The Sundays
- Jonathan Whitehead, film and television composer
- Shygirl, singer, DJ, rapper

=== Others ===
- Roly Bain, clown-priest
- Mark Hewitt, potter
- Rob Munro, Bishop of Ebbsfleet
- Mary Talbot, naval officer who served as Director of the Women's Royal Naval Service
- Malcolm Wood, British-Chinese entrepreneur and restaurateur

== See also ==
- Category:Alumni of the University of Bristol
