= Kim Baumeler =

Australian lawyer

Kim Lara Baumeler
- Occupation: Barrister
- Years active: 1993–present

Kim Baumeler is an Australian barrister, based in Hobart, Tasmania.

Baumeler graduated BA-LLB from the University of Tasmania in 1992, was admitted to practice in 1993 and became a partner with Butler McIntyre and Butler in 2004. In 2014 she became a barrister and currently practices from Liverpool Chambers. She is a member of the Sentencing Advisory Council, and is a member of the Tasmanian Law Reform Institute.

In 2010, Baumeler defended Rodney Gene Crosswell during sentencing proceedings for a notorious case in which Crosswell had fired upon Tasmania Police officer Holly Dillon, during which Dillon told the court that wearing a police uniform makes her feel like a target. Crosswell later received 10 1/2 years' imprisonment, cumulative on a sentence that he was already serving.

In 2012, Baumeler defended ABC television personality Andy Muirhead on charges related to his possession of child pornography. At his sentencing hearing, Baumeler told the court that in 2005 Muirhead had become well known throughout Australia as the host of the popular ABC television program, The Collectors, and he continued in that role until his arrest in 2010, bringing to an end his high-profile occupations. Muirhead received 7 months jail, but only had to serve 4 months.

In 2016, amid enormous public outcry, Baumeler took on the case of a youth defendant charged with the culpable homicide of Sarah Paino in a car crash at the intersections of Argyle and Davey streets in the Hobart central business district. The youth, who had been travelling at speeds up to 200 km/h (120 mph), was sentenced to 5 years' imprisonment, and the case resulted in the so-called "Sarah Paino’s Law", involving amendments to the Police Offences Act 1935 expanding police powers and more severe sentences in relation to evading drivers.

In 2016, Baumeler defended Marcus Paul Wilson who had been indicted for rape. Wilson was convicted and was sentenced to 5 years’ imprisonment. A later appeal was unsuccessful.

In 2018, Baumeler defended Russell John Nowoczynski at trial. The prosecution argued that Nowoczynski had deliberately murdered a David Crow, striking him to the head 12 times, taking his jacket, and leaving him in freezing temperatures. Nowozcynski was later found guilty of murder, and sentenced to 22 years' imprisonment, without parole for 13 years and 6 months by Chief Justice Alan Blow. He subsequently appealed against the non-parole period, but the Court of Criminal Appeal rejected the appeal conducted by Baumeler, with Justice Stephen Estcourt describing it as "insufficiently argued".

In 2019, Baumeler successfully defended an inpatient of the Northwest Regional Hospital Spencer Clinic who had been charged with rape and sexual assault. Baumeler argued that the complainant's evidence was a "total fabrication", "saying the alleged bathroom assault was highly improbable as the ward was very busy, with people coming and going, and very vigilant nurses".

Baumeler has contributed to ongoing public debates in the area of sentencing for murder, telling ABC News in 2019 in relation to the murder of Bradley Breward by Mark Rodney Jones that "life in jail for violent murderers was not the right answer", and that "Previously we had life imprisonment for murder, but people were still getting out on parole and you were genuinely seeing that people were only serving about 10 years for a sentence of murder."
