= Jure Zupan =

Slovene physicist and chemist

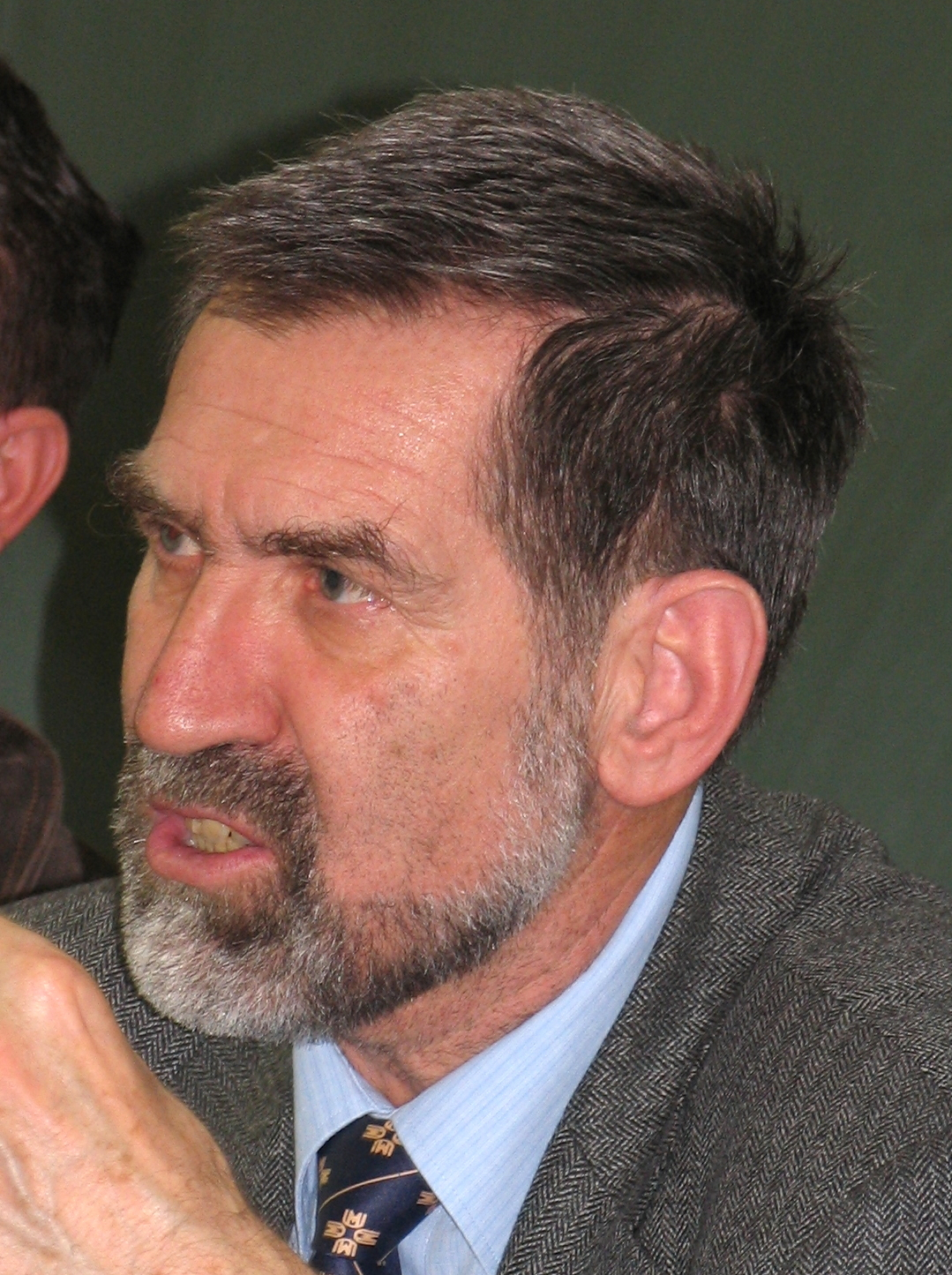
Jure Zupan

Jure Zupan is a Slovenian physicist and founder of chemometrics research in Slovenia, known for his work in applications and development of artificial neural networks in chemistry.

== Life ==
Zupan was born in Ljubljana, Slovenia in 1943. He studied physics at the University of Ljubljana and graduated in 1966. He obtained his PhD in Chemistry in 1972. He did his first research on the magnetic properties of solids at the Josef Stefan Institute, Ljubljana (1963–1973). In 1974, he has joined National Institute of Chemistry in Ljubljana to work on Computerized Databases, Chemometrics, and Artificial Intelligence. He did his postdoctoral research at ETH Zürich (1975) and at NIH, Bethesda (1978).

== Work ==
Since 1985 he is a Full professor at the University of Ljubljana. He was Visiting Professor at the Arizona State University in Tempe, USA (1982), at the Vrije Universiteit Brussel, Belgium (1988), for 3 consecutive years (each year for three months) at the Technical University of Munich, Germany (1990–1992), and at the University Rovira i Virgili, Tarragona, Spain (1995). After 1988 his research focused to the field of Artificial Neural Networks. He is now mostly interested in the multidimensional data representation and context extraction from large assembles of multidimensional data. He is member of the European Academy of Science (Salzburg) and member of the Engineering Academy of Slovenia.

== Selected publications ==
Zupan is author and editor of 10 books and monographs and has co-authored more than 200 articles. With Johann Gasteiger he co-authored Neural Networks in Chemistry and Drug Design. The book received more than 500 citations and was nominated the book of the month in 1993.

== Political career ==
- Minister for Science and Higher Education of the Republic of Slovenia
