= Mike Fraser =

Mike Fraser may refer to:

- Mike Fraser (record producer), Canadian record producer, engineer, and mixer
- Mike Fraser (referee) (born 1980), New Zealand rugby union referee
- Mike Fraser (computer scientist) (born 1975), British computer scientist

== See also ==
- Michael Fraser (disambiguation)
