= Roman Jerala =

Slovenian biochemist and synthetic biologist

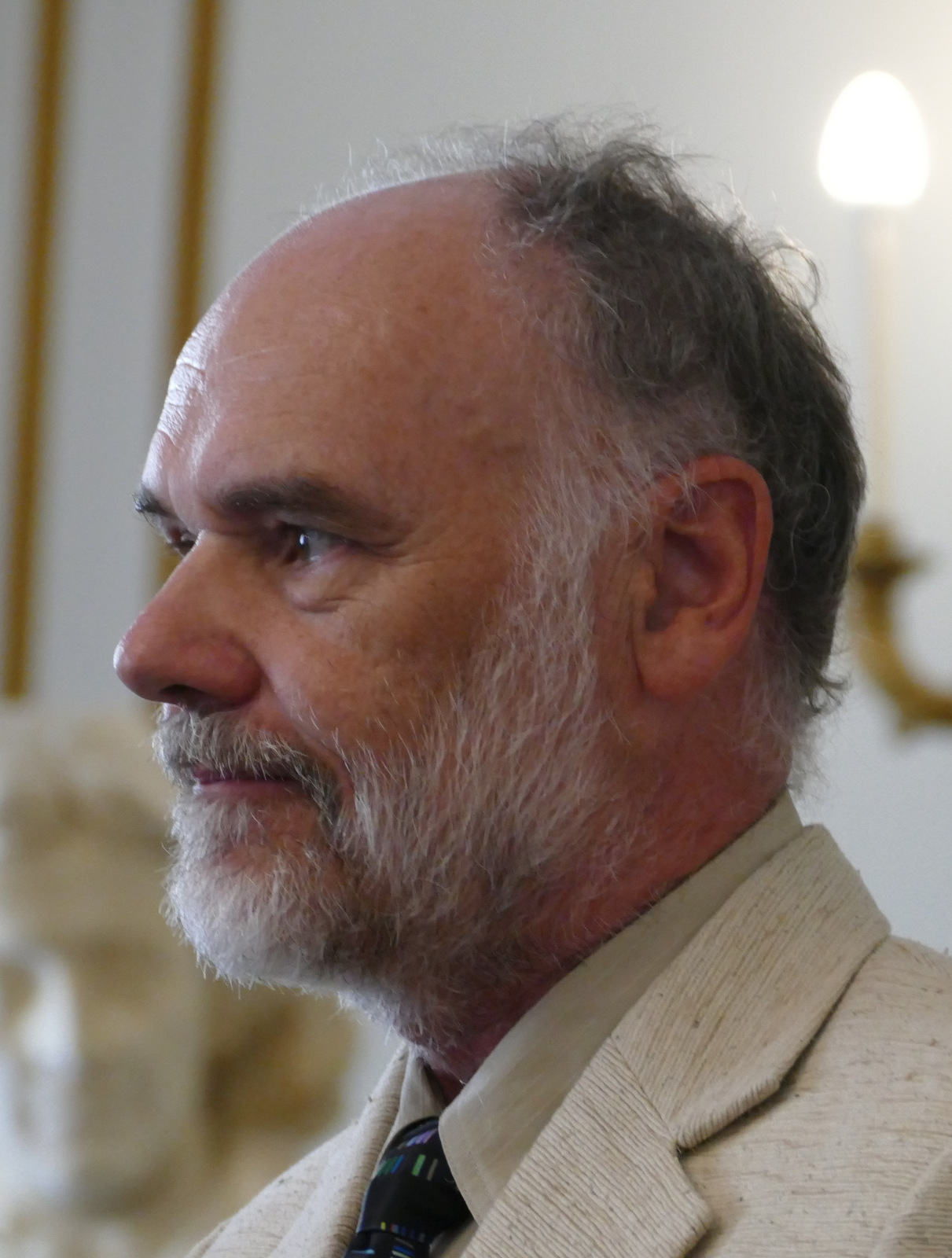
- Born: 1962 (age 63–64); Jesenice, People's Republic of Slovenia, FPR Yugoslavia (now Slovenia)
- Education: University of Ljubljana
- Scientific career
- Fields: synthetic biologist

Roman Jerala (born 1962) is a Slovenian biochemist and synthetic biologist, internationally best known as the leader of Slovenian teams that won the Grand prize at the International Genetically Engineered Machine competition several times.

== Life ==
Jerala was born in Jesenice, a town in then People's Republic of Slovenia, FPR Yugoslavia. He completed his undergraduate studies and received a PhD at the University of Ljubljana. He was a postdoc at University of Virginia, Charlottesville, USA, in academic year 1994/1995.

He is now employed at the National Institute of Chemistry in Ljubljana, Slovenia, as the head of its Department of Synthetic Biology and Immunology and a full professor at the Faculty of Chemistry and Chemical technology, University of Ljubljana. Since 2009, he is synthetic biology project director at the Centre of Excellence EN-FIST.

Jerala was elected a member of the Academia Europaea in 2017, EMBO in 2017 and to the Slovenian Academy of Arts and Sciences SAZU in 2019.

== Research ==
In 2013, Nature Chemical Biology published an article about Jerala's achievement that paves a path to designing and producing completely new protein shapes using reprogrammed bacteria by synthesizing protein that folds itself into a tetrahedron — a pyramid with a triangular base measuring just 5 nanometres along each edge - which can be used as container for delivering drugs on the nanoscale. Genetically modified Escherichia coli bacteria were drafted in to synthesize the protein.

Dek Woolfson, a biochemist from Centre for Nanoscience and Quantum Information, UK, described this kind of engineering with the following words:

This type of assembly has been achieved before using DNA, but it has always been assumed that it would be much harder to do this with proteins because there is no straightforward code that relates sequence to structure, as there is with DNA.

Jerala's team is trying to double the size of the coiled coils in the tetrahedron, and made other shapes, such as prisms and bipyramids.

== Awards ==
- 1991 Boris Kidrič Slovenian state award for science
- 2006 Grand Prize for the best project at the iGEM competition at MIT (team leader)
- 2007 finalist, Gold Medal, Best project in Health and Medicine at the iGEM competition at MIT (team leader)
- 2007 Prometheus of Science award by the Slovenian Science Foundation
- 2008 Grand prize winner at iGEM competition at MIT, Gold Medal, Best project in Health and Medicine (team leader)
- 2009 Pregl award by the National institute of chemistry for outstanding scientific achievements
- 2009 Zois award for outstanding scientific achievements (the highest national scientific award)
- 2011 Lapanje Award by the Slovenian Biochemical Society
- 2010 Grand prize winner at iGEM competition at MIT, Best project in New Application Area, Best Engineered BioBrick (team leader)
- 2014 Medal for Services awarded by the President of the Republic of Slovenia for scientific and high school education achievements
- 2015 Elected as a Member of the International Academy of Mathematical Chemistry
- 2018 ERC Advanced Grant MaCChines
- 2021 Science Promoter of 2020 by the Slovenian Science Foundation
- 2021 Nominated among the 10 Slovenian personalities of the year by the national newspaper Delo
- 2021 Grand Pregl Award by the National institute of Chemistry
- 2021 Datta prize by the Federation of European BIochemocal Societies FEBS

== In media ==
In 2011, Jerala was interviewed in Evening Guest talk show, aired by Slovenian National TV and hosted by Sandi Čolnik, one of the most recognizable Slovenian TV personalities. He has been very active during Covid19 pandemic in media promoting scientific information on the virus and vaccination.
