= List of honorary graduates of the University of Bristol =

List of notable people who have received an honorary degree from the University of Bristol.

== 2020s ==
Name	Degree	Year	Ref.
David Olusoga	Doctor of Laws	2025	
Rosemary Fowler	Doctor of Science	2024	

== See also ==
- List of University of Bristol people
