= Andre Gingrich =

Austrian ethnologist and anthropologist (born 1952)

- Born: 12 September 1952; Vienna, Austria
- Citizenship: Austrian
- Occupation: Anthropologist

Andre Gingrich (born 12 September 1952) is an Austrian ethnologist and anthropologist, member of the Austrian Academy of Sciences, director of the Institute for Social Anthropology of the Austrian Academy of Sciences, and retired professor at the University of Vienna.

== Biography ==
Andre Gingrich since 1998 to 2017 has been a full professor at the Institute of Cultural and Social Anthropology at the University of Vienna. Since 2003, he is director of the Institute of Social Anthropology of the Austrian Academy of Sciences (ÖAW).

He obtained both his doctoral degree (1979) in social anthropology (together with studies in sociology, Arabic, and Middle Eastern history) and his habilitation (1990) at Vienna University.

His research interests include anthropology and history of south-western Arabia (Saudi Arabia and Yemen), theories and methods in anthropology, the history of anthropology, personal identity, gender studies, ethnicity theory, paradox, globalization, nationalism, practice and experience of ethnographic fieldwork and intercultural and comparative analyzes of Arabic sources in ethnological and historical interpretation.

He was the head of the research project Wittgenstein 2000 – Local Identities and Local Impacts (Wittgenstein 2000 – lokale Identitäten und überlokale Einflüsse).

He is a foreign member of the Royal Swedish Academy of Sciences (since 2007), full member of the Austrian Academy of Sciences, and member of the Board of the Austrian Orient Society Hammer-Purgstall. He is editorial board member for peer-reviewed journals: Ethnos (Sweden) and Focaal (Netherlands); an advisory board member at the Max Planck Institute for Social Anthropology (Halle/G) and for the Frobenius Institute at the JW Goethe University Frankfurt.

Gingrich holds US and Austrian dual citizenship. He is married and has two children.

== Works (selection) ==
- Südwestarabische Sternenkalender. Eine ethnologische Studie zu Struktur, Kontext und regionalem Vergleich des tribalen Agrarkalenders der Munebbih im Jemen. Wiener Beiträge zur Ethnologie und Anthropologie Bd. 7, Wien: WUV, 1994.
- Erkundungen. Themen der ethnologischen Forschung. Wien-Köln-Weimar: Böhlau, 1999.
- Grammars of Identity/Alterity: A Structural Approach (edited by, with Gerd Baumann). London: Berghahn, 2004.
- One Discipline, Four Ways: British, German, French, and American Anthropology (with Fredrik Barth, Robert Parkin & Sydel Silverman). The Halle Lectures. Chicago: University of Chicago Press, 2005.
- Neo-nationalism in Europe and Beyond. Perspectives from Social Anthropology (edited by, with Marcus Banks). Berghahn Books, 2006.
- Kulturen und Kriege: Transnationale Perspektiven der Anthropologie (with Thomas Fillitz & Lutz Musner). Freiburg i. Br.: Rombach, 2007.
- Anthropology in Motion. Encounters with Current Trajectories of Scholarship from Austria (edited by), 2021.
- Völkerkunde zur NS-Zeit aus Wien (1938–1945). Institutionen, Biographien und Praktiken in Netzwerken (edited by, with Peter Rohrbacher), 2021.

Source.

== Awards ==
- Wittgenstein Award, 2000
- Preis der Stadt Wien für Geisteswissenschaften, 2015

Source.
