= Gordon Brown (television presenter) =

Australian television presenter

- Born: 1949 or 1950; Glasgow, Scotland
- Died: 10 May 2024; Hobart
- Occupations: Antique dealer and television presenter
- Employer: Australian Broadcasting Corporation
- Television: Collectors

Gordon Brown was a Scottish–Australian antique dealer, and presenter of several television programs about antiques and collecting.

Born in Glasgow, Scotland, Brown began collecting and selling antiques in Edinburgh at the age of 19. He travelled to Australia, living in Perth and eventually settling in Hobart, Tasmania, where he owns an antique shop.

With his friend Charles Wooley, Brown produced a television pilot for an antique series, which was commissioned for eight episodes by Peter Meakin at the Nine Network. However, before the series went into production, Meakin moved to the Seven Network. Brown instead presented a segment called "The Tartan Treasure Hunter" for A Current Affair.

In 2005, Brown was hired by the ABC to present a segment called "Roving Eye" on the new series Collectors, as well as acting on the show's panel as an expert on Georgian and Victorian antiques.

Collectors was cancelled in 2011, and Brown presented the second series of Auction Room, replacing William McInnes.
