= Zofija Mazej Kukovič =

Slovene politician (born 1955)

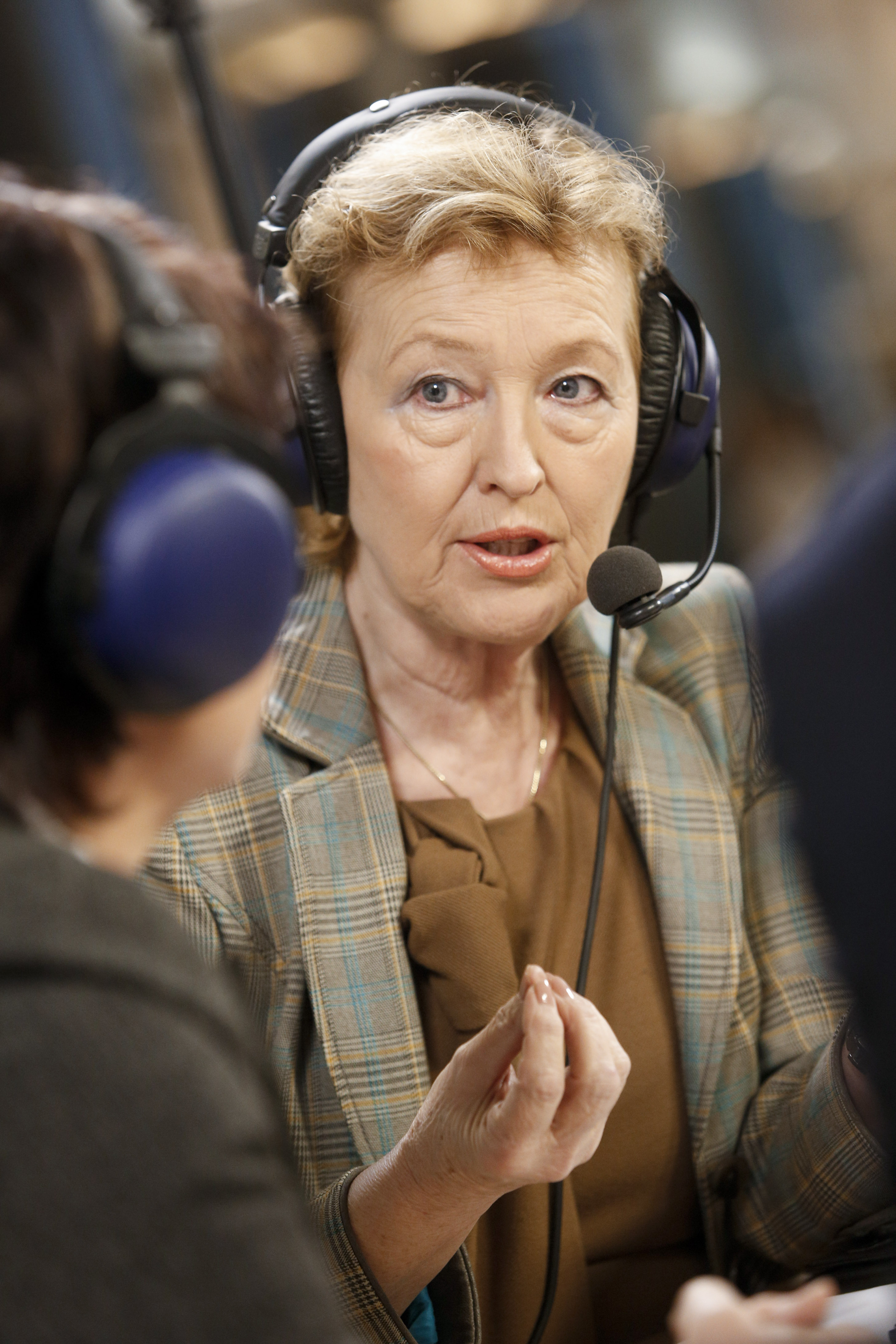
- Born: 14 May 1955 (age 71); Črna na Koroškem
- Education: University of Maribor et al
- Occupations: electrical engineer,businessperson, politician, minister
- Known for: Minister of Health 2007-8
- Political party: Slovenian Democratic Party

Zofija Mazej Kukovič (born 14 May 1955) is a Slovenian electrical engineer who became a manager and a politician. She was the minister of health 2007–8 before she was a member of the European Parliament for the Slovenian Democratic Party.

== Life ==
Kukovič was born in Črna na Koroškem in 1955. She studied informatics and later electronics at the University of Maribor. She later passed an MBA after a year's study at the Faculty of Management in Brdo pri Kranju. She speaks English, Croatian and Serbian.

In 1992 she was working for the ESO company when it divided into two halves. She led the part that became the ESO Montaža company which was heading for bankruptcy. She turned the company around and into profit.

Kukovič led the company Esotech until 3 July 2007. She served as the minister of health until 2008 after she joined the 8th Government of Slovenia in October 2007 following a reshuffle caused by the resignation of three of Janez Janša's ministers. Her appointment was agreed by eight of the members of parliament on the health committee despite her lack of experience in health. One member voted against.

She went on to eventually become a member of the European Parliament. In the 2009 European parliament elections, she was third choice on the Slovenian Democratic Party's electoral list. The party, however, only won two seats, but after the Lisbon Treaty was agreed, Kukovič became eligible to take up an additional eighth seat in the European Parliament allocated to Slovenia. She finally became an MEP on 8 December 2011, serving until the end of the term in 2014. In early 2014 she was one of four European Members of Parliament who were invited to debate issues around the right to vote by Euronat. The debate in Slovenian was intended to increase voter participation in the forthcoming elections.
