= Michael Fraser =

Michael Fraser may refer to:

- Michael Fraser (footballer) (born 1983), Scottish football goalkeeper
- Michael Fraser (basketball) (born 1984), Canadian basketball player
- Michael Fraser, Baron Fraser of Kilmorack (1915–1996), British Conservative Party political administrator

== See also ==
- Mike Fraser (disambiguation)
