= Auction Room =

- Genre: Reality
- Presented by: William McInnes (series 1); Gordon Brown (series 2)
- Country of origin: Australia
- Original language: English
- No. of seasons: 2
- No. of episodes: 20

Production
- Production location: Tasmania
- Running time: 30 minutes

Original release
- Network: ABC1
- Release: 15 April – 9 December 2012

Auction Room is an Australian reality-television series, hosted by William McInnes and produced and aired by the Australian Broadcasting Corporation. The show premiered on Sunday 15 April 2012 at 6 pm, and was renewed for a second series which was broadcast from 7 October to 9 December 2012. Former Collectors panellist Gordon Brown was the presenter for the second series, replacing McInnes.
