= Claudia Chan Shaw =

Australian fashion designer and television presenter

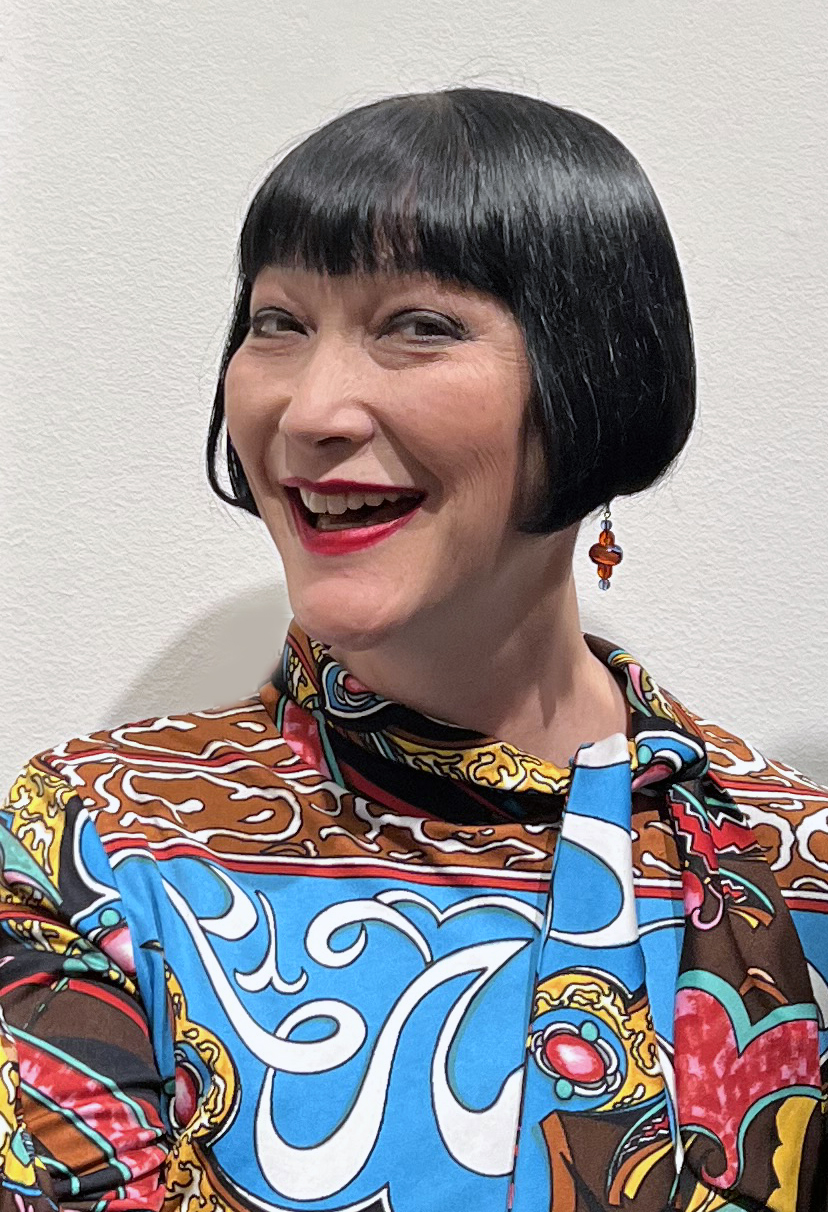
Claudia Chan Shaw, Salon des Refusés exhibition, 2023

Claudia Chan Shaw is an Australian-born fashion designer and television presenter of Chinese ancestry.

== Early life ==
She was born in Annandale in the inner western suburbs of Sydney, studied at Fort Street High School, and visual communications design at Sydney College of the Arts and export marketing at Monash University. Her mother, Vivian Chan Shaw, designed and produced knitwear, and Claudia used her training to establish an export market for her mother's eponymous clothing label. They currently work as design and retail partners operating a knitwear boutique in Sydney's Queen Victoria Building.

Chan Shaw had appeared on the Australian Broadcasting Corporation's (ABC) series Collectors as a guest in 2008, showcasing her collection of tin space toys and toy robots. When panellist Nicolle Warren left the show, Chan Shaw was asked to replace her and appeared in her first episode as a panellist on 14 February 2010.

Chan Shaw has been the subject of a number of portraits that have been painted as entries in the Archibald Prize. In 2023 she was painted by two artists, Sally Ryan and John Klein, with Ryan's portrait being selected for the Archibald Prize and Klein's portrait being selected for the Archibald Prize Salon des Refusés.

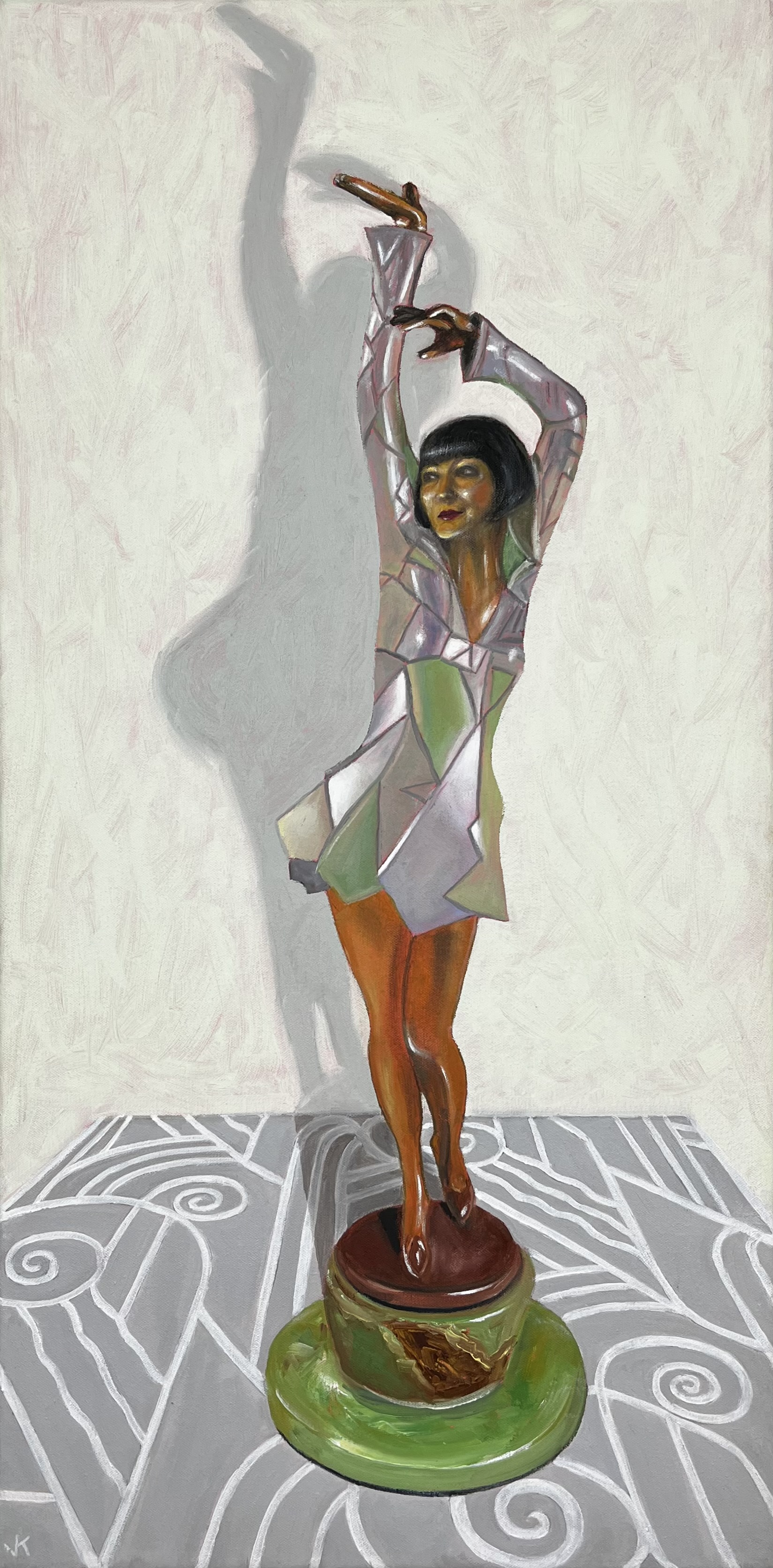
'Deco Goddess' portrait of Chan Shaw by Australian artist John Klein, Archibald Prize Salon des Refusés, 2023
