= Chris McMahon (academic) =

British mechanical engineer (born 1955)

Christopher Alan McMahon
- Born: 30 June 1955 (age 71); Clevedon, England
- Occupations: Mechanical engineer, academic and design researcher

Christopher Alan McMahon is a British mechanical engineer, academic and a researcher. He is a retired professor of engineering design and serves as senior research fellow and senior associate teacher at the University of Bristol.

McMahon has published two editions of a textbook on computer-aided design and manufacture, and authored a number of research papers focusing on engineering design and computer-aided design, especially concerning the application of computers to the management of information and uncertainty in design and design automation.

== Education and early career ==
McMahon graduated in mechanical engineering from the University of Bristol in 1978; prior to working in the railway and then automotive industries.

== Academic career ==
McMahon joined the University of Bristol as a lecturer in 1984, and worked there until 2002, when he joined the University of Bath. He was promoted to professor of engineering design in 2005, becoming director of Bath's Integrated Design and Manufacturing Research Centre. In 2012 he returned to the University of Bristol as professor of engineering design. In 2017 and 2018 he worked in the Department of Mechanical Engineering of the Technical University of Denmark.

== Research ==
McMahon's research interests include engineering design and computer-aided design, focusing on the application of computers to the management of information and uncertainty in design and design automation. He has carried out research in knowledge and information management for complex long-lived engineering products and systems, in information requirements of engineering designers and in systems to support their information organization and access. He has also researched in annotation in design, risk and uncertainty management in design, in component durability and reliability, and in eco-design and design for remanufacturing. The majority of his work has been carried out in conjunction with industry.

His research on computer aided design and manufacture (CADCAM) includes the introduction of a general purpose ontology-driven annotation approach for recording view-point dependent information in CAD, and work on the use of parametric and associative CAD systems to support the complex and lengthy design activities in the automotive industry.

He and his colleagues conducted in order to examine the barriers to improving information management in engineering companies, and to develop a set of core issues to inform their long term planning of information systems strategy. In a 2006 paper, hen proposed an information accessing framework using computational classification technologies. He also presented the use of multiple document structure views using decomposition schemes. His proposed framework combines automatic fragment extraction, markup technologies, document structure study and faceted classification for retrieving specific document fragment.

McMahon has made a number of observations on the diversity of design research, applying his experience in information management to the categorization of design research activities. He has also published influential review papers on knowledge management in engineering design, noting the broad division between personalisation and codification approaches, and on informatics in engineering design.

== Professional activities ==
McMahon is associated as an editorial board member with various journals including Research in Engineering Design, Journal of Engineering Design, Advanced Engineering Informatics, International Journal of PLM, AIEDAM and She Ji: Journal of Design, Economics and Innovation. In 2005, he joined the Board of Management of the Design Society and served as its president from 2011 to 2013. He is a Fellow of the Institution of Mechanical Engineers.

Together with Jimmie Browne of the National University of Ireland, Galway, in 1992 McMahon published a textbook on computer-aided design and manufacture CADCAM From Principles to Practice (second edition, 1998).

In 2020, McMahon published a translation of Philippe Bihouix's book, The Age of Low Tech: Towards a Technologically Sustainable Civilization.

== Bibliography ==
=== Books ===
- CADCAM: From Principles to Practice (1993) ISBN 978-0201565027
- CADCAM: Principles, Practice and Manufacturing Management (2nd Edition) (1998) ISBN 978-0201178197
- The Age of Low Tech: Towards a Technologically Sustainable Civilization (2020) ISBN 978-1529213270

=== Selected articles ===
- King, Andrew M.; Burgess, Stuart C.; Ijomah, Winnie; McMahon, Chris A. (October 2006). "Reducing waste: repair, recondition, remanufacture or recycle?". Sustainable Development. 14 (4): 257–267. doi:10.1002/sd.271.
- Kaymaz, Irfan; McMahon, Chris A. (January 2005). "A response surface method based on weighted regression for structural reliability analysis". Probabilistic Engineering Mechanics. 20 (1): 11–17. doi:10.1016/j.probengmech.2004.05.005.
- McMahon, Chris; Lowe, Alistair; Culley, Steve (August 2004). "Knowledge management in engineering design: personalization and codification". Journal of Engineering Design. 15 (4): 307–325. doi:10.1080/09544820410001697154. S2CID 109792303.
- Li, W. D.; McMahon, C. A. (January 2007). "A simulated annealing-based optimization approach for integrated process planning and scheduling" (PDF). International Journal of Computer Integrated Manufacturing. 20 (1): 80–95. doi:10.1080/09511920600667366. S2CID 205628276.
