= Louisa Ghevaert =

British family law and fertility solicitor

Louisa Maria Ghevaert
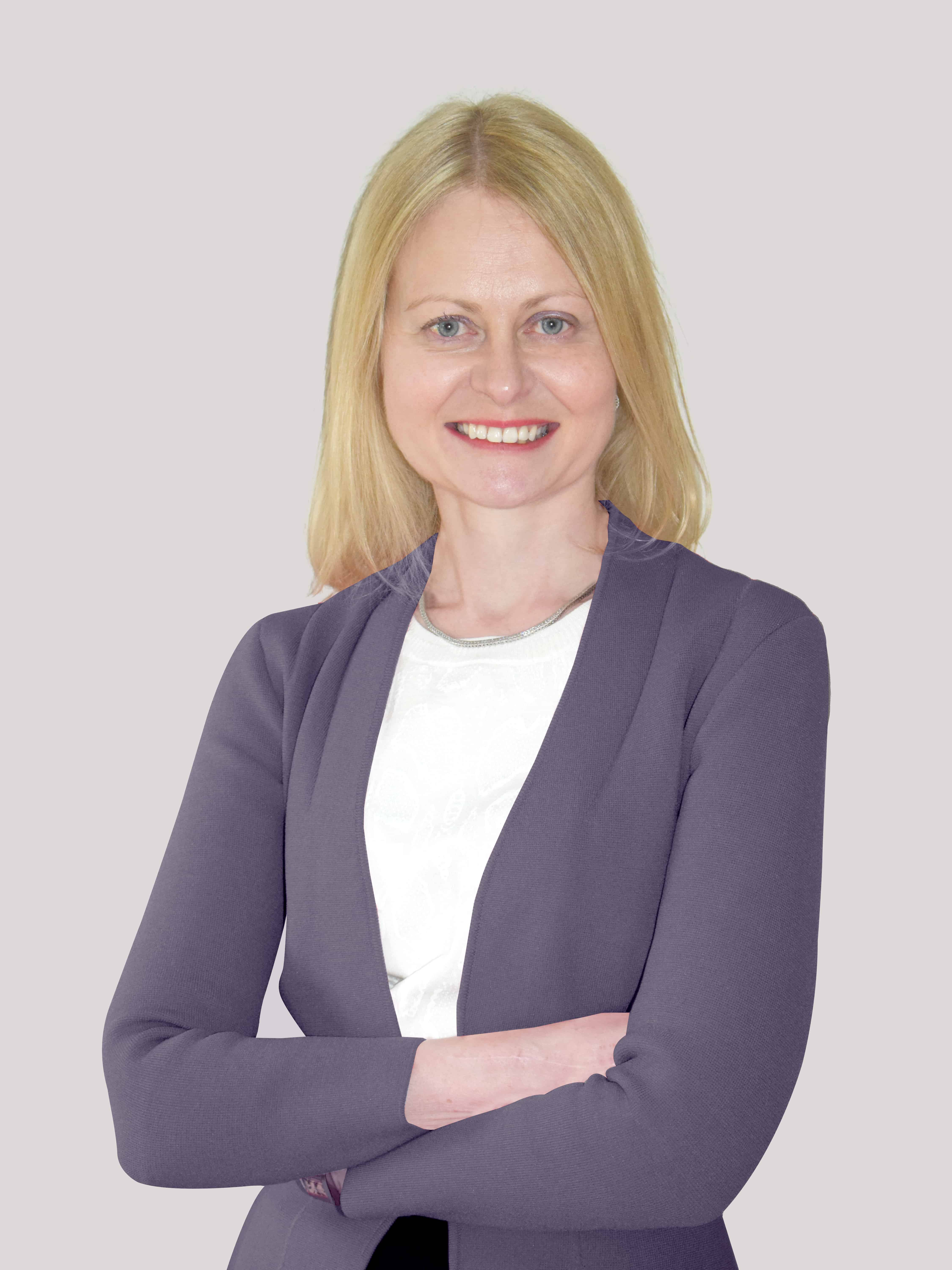
- Citizenship: British
- Occupation: Solicitor
- Years active: 2000- present
- Organization: Louisa Ghevaert Associates
- Known for: Family law; Surrogacy law; Donor conception; Posthumous conception
- Website: Official profile

Louisa Maria Ghevaert (born September 1974) is a solicitor of the Senior Courts of England and Wales. Ghevaert specialises in fertility, surrogacy, donor conception, posthumous conception, adoption and family law.

== Education ==
Louisa Ghevaert read BA Degree in History (Hons) at the University of Bristol, before undertaking the Common Professional Entrance (CPE) and the Legal Practice Course (LPC) at the College of Law in Guildford.

== Career ==
They have worked on several landmark legal cases for changes and improvements to fertility, children law, and family law for families in the UK. She is the founder of specialist fertility and family law firm Louisa Ghevaert Associates.

In 2008, Ghevaert acted for British intended parents in Re X and Y (foreign surrogacy) [2008] EWHC 3030 (Fam), being the first case in UK legal history to test the law for British parents conceiving through an international commercial surrogacy arrangement in Ukraine.

In 2009 Ghevaert acted for Melanie and Robert Gladwin saving their frozen embryos from destruction, following which the Department of Health issued a change to embryo storage law in the UK for surrogate pregnancies, for which she was named The Times Lawyer of the Week.

In 2010, Ghevaert acted for British intended parents who conceived a child with a US surrogate in Re L (a minor) [2010] EWHC 3146 (Fam). The ruling resulted in a precedent that the welfare of the child is decisive over the public policy ban of commercial surrogacy except in the clearest cases of abuse of public policy. The national media covered the outcome. The case set a precedent that the welfare of the child is decisive over the public policy ban on commercial surrogacy except in the clearest cases of abuse of public policy.

Ghevaert acted for Donna and Dean Marshall in 2011, helping them win a rare legal battle for IVF funding on the NHS against their local hospital authority. In 2012, she acted for Andrea Heywood, who aged 24 was denied NHS funding for IVF by her local hospital authority for being too young. In 2014, Ghevaert acted for the intended father in a UK surrogacy dispute about a child's care and parentage in JP v LP & Ors [2014] EWHC 595 (Fam). The legal ruling highlighted the risks of informal agreements and established a legal framework for cases where criteria for a parental order cannot be met following marital breakdown and divorce.

From 2014 to 2018, Ghevaert was a member of the cross-organizational Surrogacy UK Working Party on Surrogacy Law Reform and contributor to the report on surrogacy in the UK Myth busting and reform (2015). This informed parliamentary debate on surrogacy law reform and policy in The House of Lords in 2016 and subsequent work on reform of surrogacy law in the UK. She was part of the wife's legal team in Y v A (2018), a first-of-its kind legal ruling from the Court of Protection to extract and store sperm from a fatally injured man for use in posthumous fertility treatment. Ghevaert was awarded a place on The Lawyer Hot 100 List 2018 for her legal work on cases regarding the family, fertility and medical sectors. They described her "as an influential figure when it comes to ensuring fertility laws are fit for purpose in the 21st century".

Through 2018, 2019 and 2020, Ghevaert's expert legal evidence in the Court of Appeal and the Supreme Court resulted in further legal rulings for a woman rendered infertile following a delay in detecting cancer in smear tests and biopsies, enabling for the first time recovery of damages for commercial surrogacy, donor conception and fertility treatment in the US, XX v Whittington Hospital NHS Trust [2018] EWCA Civ 2832 and Whittington Hospital NHS Trust v XX [2020] UKSC 14.

From 2017 to 2022, Ghevaert was an expert member of the Egg Donation in the UK, Belgium and Spain: an Interdisciplinary Study (EDNA) Stakeholder Advisory Group led by Professor Nicky Hudson at the Centre for Reproduction Research (CRR) at De Montfort University in collaboration with the Bioethics Institute Ghent, in Belgium and the Consejo Superior Investigaciones Científicas (CSIC) in Spain. The EDNA study was funded by the Economic & Social Research Council and looked at the future landscape of egg donation policy, practices and governance in the UK, Belgium and Spain.

== Publications ==
Ghevaert is a specialist contributor on surrogacy law in practitioner reference book The International Family Law Practice. She also contributed to the book Legal and Regulatory Risks to Patients: The UK Context.

== See also ==
- List of University of Bristol people
