= Adrian Franklin =

British-Australian sociologist and television presenter

- Born: Canterbury, Kent, England

Academic background
- Education: University of Kent; University of Bristol

Academic work
- Discipline: Social anthropology, sociology, cultural studies
- Institutions: University of South Australia; University of Tasmania; University of Oslo; University of Bristol Adelaide University

Adrian S. Franklin is a British social anthropologist and writer. He had held professorial position in the UK, Europe and Australia. He is currently Adjunct Research Professor at Adelaide University

== Early life and education ==
Adrian S. Franklin was born in 1955 in Canterbury, England. He attended Simon Langton Grammar School and read social anthropology and sociology at the University of Kent.

He holds a Master of Arts in social anthropology from the University of Kent, and was awarded his PhD from the University of Bristol in 1989 for his thesis "Privatism, the Home and Working Class Culture".

== Career ==
Franklin has been appointed to professorial roles at Bristol University, the University of Tasmania, the University of Oslo's (the Institute for Social Anthropology)He was appointed professor at the University of South Australia (UniSA) in 2017 and Adelaide University in 2006.

His research interests include the changing nature of contemporary social bonds; loneliness and belonging; art museums and art publics; art tourism and tourism theory; culture-led urban regeneration, urban anthropology, animal studies; more-than-human studies,

== Other activities ==
Franklin was a panellist and later co-host on the ABC Television series Collectors 2004 -2011. Series 1, 2, 3, 4, 5, 6, 7. (total of 256 Episodes).

== Recognition ==
Recent highlight include:

August 2024 Named on Stanford University's 2024 World's Top 2% Scientists ranking. August 2024 data-update for "Updated science-wide author databases of standardized citation indicators" - Elsevier BV (digitalcommonsdata.com).

July 2023 Invited Guest Keynote Speaker to a One-Day Symposium on Studies of Contemporary Ritual at the Centre for Performance Studies and Studies in Religion at the new Chau Chak Wing Museum, University of Sydney. for 27 October 2023.

Appointed to Australian Research Council's College of Experts 2023-2027.

Contributing author to book awarded the Prize for Best Arts Anthology of the Year (2021): The Australian Art Field: Practices, Policies, Institutions. (Tony Bennett et al, London: Routledge (2020). Awarded by the Art Association of Australia and New Zealand). My chapter: 'Mona and the political-cultural economy of independent galleries'.

Commissioned to deliver the Sir William Dobell Annual Art Lecture 2020, School of Art and Design, Australian National University, Canberra, November 25, 2020. [Zoom presentation and written text (7800 words)]. Title: 'Upping the Anti-museum: Museums, Covid-19 and its Aftermath'.

My book Anti-Museum (2020), was included in Charles Saumarez Smith's [Former Director of National Gallery, National Portrait Gallery, Director of Research, Victoria and Albert Museum and CEO of Royal Academy] best 5 art museum books in the world. https://fivebooks.com/best-books/the-art-museum-charles-saumarez-smith/

Visiting Professor, Institute for Culture and Society, Western Sydney University 2019.

Author, Best Illustrated Book 2015, The Making of MONA, Penguin 2015.

VC's 2012 Award for Excellence in Community Engagement, UTAS

Visiting Professor of Sociology, University of Exeter, 2011.

UniJobs Lecturer of the Year Nominee, 2010

Distinguished Visiting Professor, Department of Sociology, University of Auckland, 2009.

Elected Member of the Association of Social Anthropologists of the Commonwealth, UK. (Elected 1990)

== Books ==
- Housing Finance and the Housing Market in Bristol, London: Joseph Rowntree Foundation, 1990. (with G. Bramley, W. Bartlett and C. Lambert), (145 pp).
- Experts, Landlords and Tenants: The Private Rented Sector in Bristol (Policy Press 1992)
- New homes for home owners. London: HMSO. 1993. (with Forrest, RS., Murie, A., Gordon, D., Burton, PA., Doogan, KJ) (147pp).1993
- Home from Home - Refugees in Tasmania. Canberra: Department of Immigration and Multicultural Affairs, AGPS. 1997. (with Roberta Julian and Bruce Felmingham)
- Animals and Modern Cultures: A Sociology of Human–Animal Relations in Modernity (Sage 1999)
- Nature and Social Theory (Sage, 2002)
- Tourism (Sage, 2003)
- Animal Nation: The True Story of Animals and Australia (University of New South Wales Press, 2007)
- A Collectors Year (New South 2008)
- Collecting the 20th Century (University of New South Wales Press/Powerhouse Museum, 2009)
- City Life (Sage, 2010)
- Retro: A Guide to the Mid-Twentieth Century Design Revival (Bloomsbury, 2013)
- The Making of MONA (Penguin, 2014)
- Tom Moore - Abundant Wonder. Wakefield Press (about glass artist Tom Moore; with Lisa Slade and Mark Thomson, 2020)
- Anti-museum (Routledge, 2020)
- The Routledge International Handbook of More-than-Human Studies (editor; 2024)

Book Chapters

‘Art tourism revisited: Gatherings Around Vibrant Matter’, in Carina Ren and Gunnar Thór Jóhannesson (Eds.) Research Handbook on Tourism Theory; Edward Elgar Publishing 2026. ISBN 978-1-0353-4251-8

‘Art Tourism’ in Timothy Dallen (ed.) Comprehensive Foundations of Tourism. Elsevier 2026. doi:10.1016/B978-0-443-27698-9.00068-4 2026

‘Entangling Early: Rebuilding Passion for Natural and Cultural Terroir for Post-Covid, Low-Carbon Societies’, in Felicity Picken and Emma Waterton (Eds.) Shores,Surfaces and Depths: Oceanic Cultures of Tourism and Leisure. Routledge; 2024.

‘The Separation’ for Adrian Franklin (Ed.) The Routledge International Handbook of The More-than Human Studies. 2023 (14,125 words)

‘The More than-Human City’ for Adrian Franklin (Ed.) The Routledge International Handbook of The More-than Human Studies. 2023. 8,000 words.

‘Walking into the Future with Bruno Latour’ for Adrian Franklin (Ed.) The Routledge International Handbook of The More-than Human Studies. 2023. (12,922 words)

'Zoos' in C. Rojek and G. Ritzer (Eds.) 'Blackwell Encyclopaedia of Sociology.' Oxford: Blackwell. 2023

‘Loneliness - The Decline of Cultural and Everyday Sources of Belonging in Contemporary Societies’ in Michael Hviid Jacobsen (Ed.) Emotions in culture and everyday life - Conceptual, theoretical and empirical explorations. London: Routledge. 2022.

‘Urbanizing’ in Steve Matthewman, Bruce Curtis, David Mayeda (Eds.) Being Sociological, London: Macmillan 2021

‘Mona and the political-cultural economy of independent galleries’ in Tony Bennett, Deborah Stevenson, Fred Myers and Tamara Winikoff (eds.) The Australian Art Field: Practices, Policies, Institutions. London: Routledge. (2020).

‘Loneliness and Love in Late-Modernity: Sites of Tension and Resistance’in Roger Patulny (ed.) Emotions in Late Modernity, London: Routledge [with Barbara Barbosa Neves (UniMelb) and Nicholas Hookway (UTAS)] 2019.

‘Feral Tourism’, in Bryan Grimwood, Kellee Caton, Lisa Cooke, and David Fennell (Eds.) New Moral NaturesTourism.LondoRoutledge [with Thomas Colas, Ecoles Normales Superior, Paris]. 2018

‘Far from the Madding Crowd: Big Cats on Dartmoor and in Dorset’ in Samantha Hurn (Ed.) Anthropology and CryptozoologyResearching Encounters with Mysterious Creatures. London: Routledge. 2017.

‘The MONA Effect: Building Culture into Cities’, in Andrew Hoyne (Ed.) The Power of Place. Sydney: Hoyne. 2017:186-199.

‘Ecosystem and Landscape: Strategies for the Anthropocene’ in Human Animal Research Network Eds [Boyd, Chrulew, Degeling, Mrva-Montoya, Probyn-Rapsey, Wadiwel], Life in the Anthropocene. Sydney: Sydney University Press. 2015.

‘The Adored and the Abhorrent: Nationalism and Feral Cats in England and Australia’ in G. Marvin and S. McHugh (Eds) Routledge Handbook of Human-Animal Studies, London: Routledge, 2014.

‘Tourist Studies’ in Adey, P. Bissell, D Hannam, K., Merriman K. and Sheller, M. (eds) Handbook of Mobilities. London: Routledge. 2014

‘The Entomological Passion: Human-Insect Relations and Representations in English Flyfishing’ The Management of Insects in Recreation and Tourism. Cambridge, UK: University of Cambridge Press. 2013.

‘Viewing Nature Politically’ in The Routledge Handbook of Tourism and the Natural Environment, Andrew Holden and Dave Fennell (Editors). London: Routledge. 2013.

‘The Choreography of a Mobile World: Tourism Orderings’ for René van der Duim, Gunnar Thór Jóhannesson & Carina Ren (Eds) Actor Network Theory and Tourism. Ontologies, Methodologies and Performances. London: Routledge. 2012.

‘Burning Cities: A Post-humanist Account of Australians and Eucalypts’, in Stuart Elden (Ed.) Environment and Planning. Sage: London. 2012.

‘Ethnography and Housing Studies’ in Richard Hobbs (ed.) Ethnography in Context. London: Sage. 2011:25-57.

‘The Ethics of Second-hand Consumption’ in T. Lewis and E Potter (eds), Ethical Consumption, London: Routledge, pp. 156-168. (2011).

‘An Improper Nature? ‘Species Cleansing’ in Australia’ in Human and Other Animals: Critical Perspectives, Bob Carter and Nickie Charles (Eds.). London: Palgrave Macmillan. 2011: 195-216.

‘The Tourism Syndrome: An Interview with Zygmunt Bauman’, in, Marina Sorbello and Antje Weitzel (ed), Transient Spaces: The Tourist Syndrome. Berlin: Argobooks. 8–15. 2010.

‘The Sociology of Tourism’ in T. Jamal and M. Robinson (Eds.) Handbook of Tourism Studies, London: Sage. 2009.

‘A Choreography of Fire: A Posthumanist Account of Australians and Forests’ in Andrew Pickering and Keith Guzik (Eds.) The Mangle in Practice: Science, Society and Becoming. Durham, NC: Duke University Press. pp: 17 – 45 2008.

‘The ‘Animal Question’ and the Consumption of Wildlife’ in Brent Lovelock (Ed.) Consumptive Wildlife Tourism - Hunting, Shooting and Sport Fishing. London: Routledge. pp386-403. 2008.

‘Plant Geographies’ in R. Kitchin and N. Thrift (Eds.) International Encyclopedia of Human Geography. London: Elsevier. 2008: 200-203.

‘Ethnography and Housing Studies Revisited’ in Paul J. Maginn; Matthew Tonts; and Susan M. Thompson (Eds) Qualitative Housing Analysis: An International Perspective. Bingley, UK: Emerald Press. 2008: 271-289.

‘The problem with tourism theory’ in Irena Ateljevic, Nigel Morgan, Annette Pritchard and Candice Harris (eds.) The Critical Turn in Tourism Studies: Innovative Research Methodologies. London: Elsevier. 2007 pp. 131-148.

‘Companion Animals: From Modernity to Postmodernity’, in R.Wilkie and D. Inglis (Eds.) Animals and Society: Critical Concepts in the Social Sciences. London: Routledge. 2007.

‘Tourism’ in Rojek, C., Shaw, S. and Veal, T. Handbook of Leisure Studies. London: Palgrave MacMillan. pp 386-403. 2006

Society and biology’ in G. Ritzer (Ed.) 'Blackwell Encyclopaedia of the Sociology.' Oxford: Blackwell. 2006.

‘Posthumanism’ in G. Ritzer (Ed.) 'Blackwell Encyclopaedia of the Sociology.' Oxford: Blackwell. 2006.

‘Nature’ in G. Ritzer (Ed.) 'Blackwell Encyclopaedia of the Sociology.' Oxford: Blackwell. 2006.

‘Human-animal relations’ in G. Ritzer (Ed.) 'Blackwell Encyclopaedia of the Sociology.' Oxford: Blackwell. 2006.

‘Zoos’ in G. Ritzer (Ed.) 'Blackwell Encyclopaedia of the Sociology.' Oxford: Blackwell. 2006.

‘Jazz’ in G. Ritzer (Ed.) 'Blackwell Encyclopaedia of the Sociology.' Oxford: Blackwell. 2006.

‘Cultural Reproduction’ in G. Ritzer (Ed.) 'Blackwell Encyclopaedia of the Sociology.' Oxford: Blackwell. 2006.

‘Elite culture’ in G. Ritzer (Ed.) 'Blackwell Encyclopaedia of the Sociology.' Oxford: Blackwell. 2006.

‘Soap Operas’ in G. Ritzer (Ed.) 'Blackwell Encyclopaedia of Sociology. Oxford: Blackwell. 2006.

'On Fox hunting and Angling: Norbert Elias and the Sportisation Process' in S. Mennell and E. Dunning (Eds.) Norbert Elias. Sage Masters of Modern Social Theory. London: Sage: 213-236. 2003.

‘Consuming Retro and Design through Collecting’, in Alison Anderson, Kevin Meethan and Steve Miles (Eds.) The Changing Consumer. London: Routledge (2001).

‘Animals and Postmaterialism: An Anomaly for Inglehart’, in J. Pudsey (ed.) Sociological Signs and Sights. Adelaide: Flinders University Press. 2000. [with Bob White and Bruce Tranter]

Review of Tales of the City: A Study of Narrative and Urban Life by Ruth Finnegan [Cambridge University Press] in Urban Studies, 36(13) 2426-2428 1999.

'Family networks, reciprocity and housing wealth', in R. Forrest and A. Murie (eds.) Housing and Wealth in Comparative Perspective, London: Routledge. 231-260. 1995

'Variations in marital relations and the implications for women's experience of the home - evidence from contemporary working class areas in Accrington, Consett and Cheltenham', T. Putnam (ed.) Household Choices, London: Futures Publications. 1991: 57-65.

Journal Articles

Franklin, A.S (2026) ‘The archetypal tourist gaze? Art and the history of tourism’ for Tourism and Arts, Journal of Tourism and Art, Webinar 8 June. Rita Baleiro, Kate Torkington & Alexandra Gonçalves (Editors)

Franklin, A.S. (2023). Carnival Relocated? Popular Culture and the Carnivalesque in Colonial Van Diemen’s Land (Tasmania). Cultural and Social History, 20(5), 661-683. [Q1 History].

Franklin, A.S and Tranter, B. (2022) ‘Places of belonging, loneliness and lockdown, Thesis Eleven: Critical Theory and Historical Sociology. In special issue on Place, Textures and Atmospherics. 172(1):150-165.

Franklin, A.S., Lee, B. and Rentschler, R. (2022) ‘The Adelaide Festival and the Development of Arts in Adelaide’, Journal of Urban Affairs Q1

Michelle Duffy, Caroline Scarles, Tim Edensor and Gordon Waitt and Franklin, A.S. (2021) ‘Twenty Years on: Reflections on the Journeys Travelled and Future Directions for Tourist Studies’, Tourist Studies 20(1) March.

Franklin, A.S. and Tranter, B. (2021) ‘Loneliness and the cultural, spatial, temporal and generational bases of belonging’, Australian Journal of Psychology.

Franklin, A.S. (2019) Where “Art Meets Life”: Assessing the Impact of Dark Mofo, A New Mid-Winter Festival in Australia, Journal of Festive Studies, Vol. 1, No. 1, Spring, 106–127. https://doi.org/10.33823/jfs.2019.1.1.27

Franklin, A.S., Bruce Tranter Roger Patulny; Barbara Barbosa Neves, Nicholas Hookway and Katrina Jaworski (2019) 'Towards an understanding of loneliness among Australian men: Gender cultures, embodied expression and the social bases of belonging. Journal of Sociology, 55(1), 124–143. 1https://doi.org/10.1177/1440783318777309

Franklin, A.S. (2018) ‘Art Tourism: A New Field for Tourist Studies’, Tourist Studies 18(4): 399-416.

Franklin, A.S. (2018) ‘‘Aimless and Absurd Wanderings’? Children at the Museum of Old and New Art (Mona)’, Museum and Society, 16(1):28-40. (With Michelle Sansom, University of Tasmania). https://journals.le.ac.uk/ojs1/index.php/mas/article/view/2679

Kate Booth, Justin O’Connor Adrian Franklin and Nikos Papastergiadis (2017) A Museum (but not as we know it)…’ Visitor Studies http://dx.doi.org/10.1080/10645578.2017.1297121 2017.

Franklin, A.S. (2017) The More-Than-Human City’, The Sociological Review, 65(2): pp202-217. Q1 , https://doi.org/10.1111/1467-954X.12396

Franklin, A.S. and Nikos Papastergiadis (2017). Engaging with the anti-museum? Visitors to the Museum of Old and New Art. Journal of Sociology, 53(3), 670–686. https://doi.org/10.1177/1440783317712866

Franklin, A.S. (2016) ‘Journeys to the Guggenheim Museum Bilbao: Towards a Revised Bilbao Effect.’ Annals of Tourism Research vol. 59, issue C, pages 79-92 .

Franklin, A.S. (2015).‘Miffy and Me: Developing an Ethnographic approach to the Study of Companion Animals and Human Loneliness’, Animal Studies Journal, 4 (2) pp. 78-115.

Franklin, A.S (2014) ‘On why we dig the beach: Tracing the subjects and objects of the bucket and spade for a relational materialist theory of the beach’, Tourist Studies: An International Journal pp. online. doi:10.1177/1468797614536331 ISSN 1468-7976

Franklin, A.S and Picken, F. (2014)‘The Changing Nature of Beach Tourism for Low Carbon Societies: The Australian Case’, The International Journal of Climate Change: Impacts and Responses, 4(3): 1835-1856.

Franklin, A.S (2012) ‘A Lonely Society? Loneliness and Liquid Modernity in Australia’, Australian Journal of Social Issues, 47 (1) pp. 11-28.

Franklin, A.S (2012) ‘Dingos in the Dock’, New Scientist, Reed-Elsevier, 2852: 28-29. 15 February.

Franklin, A.S (2011). 'Performing Acclimatisation: The Agency of Trout in Postcolonial Australia’ Ethnos 76(1):19-40. March

Franklin, A.S and Tranter, B. (2011)‘Housing, loneliness and health’, Australian Housing and Urban Research Institute Final Report No. 164, pp. 1-30. ISSN 1834-7223

Franklin, A.S (2010) ‘Aboriginalia: Souvenir wares and the Aboriginalisation of Australian Identity’ Tourist Studies 10(3) 195-208.

Franklin, A.S (2011) Editor of Special Issue: ‘Contemporary Tourist Studies in Australia’ for Tourist Studies vo10 (3) pp 195-283.

Franklin, AS, (2009) ‘On Loneliness’, Geografiska Annaler: Series B, Human Geography, 91 (4) pp. 343-354. ISSN 0435-3684.

Franklin, A.S (2008) ‘The Tourism Ordering: Taking Tourism More Seriously as an Ordering of a Global World’ Civilisations: Revue International d’Anthropologie et de Sciences Humaine. 57 (1-2):25-39.

Franklin, A.S (2008) ‘Relating to Birds in Postcolonial Australia’ Kunapipi: Journal of Postcolonial Writing and Culture 29(2): 102-141.

Franklin, A.S,, Donna Haraway; Max Travers and Mike Emmison (2007) ‘Investigating the therapeutic benefits of dogs’, with Donna Haraway, Max Travers and Mike Emmison, Qualitative Sociology Research Vol. III :42-58.

Franklin, A.S, (2007) ‘Human-animal relations in Australia: an overview of results from the first national survey and follow-up case studies 2000-2004. Animals and Society. Vol 15: 7-27 2007.

Franklin, A.S, (2006) ‘Beware the dog: A posthumanist approach to housing’ Housing, Theory and Society 23(3):137-156.

Franklin, A.S, (2006) ‘Burning Cities: A Posthumanist Account of Australians and Eucalypts’ Environment and Planning D: Society and Space 24(4):555-576

Franklin, A.S, (2006) ‘The [In]Humanity of the Wilderness Photo’ Australian Humanities Review, 28, April: 1-16.

Franklin, A.S, (2004) ‘Tourism as an ordering’, Tourist Studies, 4 (3) pp. 277-301.

Franklin, A.S, (2003) ‘‘The Tourist Syndrome’: an Interview with Zygmunt Bauman’, Tourist Studies, 3 (2):205-17 .

Franklin, A.S, (2002) Review Article J. Germov and L. Williams (eds), The Social Appetite: A Sociology of Food and Nutrition: Oxford University Press. Journal of Sociology 37(1): 99-103.

Franklin, A.S, (2002) ‘Human-Animal Relations in Australia: The Unique Case of Tasmania?’ Tasmanian Social Issues 4(1): 2002:2-3.

Franklin, A.S, Bob White and Bruce Tranter (2001) ‘Explaining Support for Animal Rights: A Comparison of Two Recent Approaches to Humans, Nonhuman Animals, and Postmodernity’, Society and Animals, 9 (2) 127-144.

Franklin, A.S, (2001)‘The Performance of Museums and World Fairs: an Interview with Barbara Kirshenblatt-Gimblett’ Tourist Studies, 1 (3): 1-22.

Franklin, (A.S,2001) ‘Neo-Darwinian Leisures: the Body and Nature in Modernity’, Body and Society, Vol 7(2): 57-76.

Franklin, A.S and Mike Craig) (2001) ‘The Trouble with Tourism and Travel Theory?’ Tourist Studies, 1 (1): 5-22.

Franklin, A.S, and Bob White (2001) ‘Animals and Modernity: Changing Human-Animal Relations 1945 -1998’ Journal of Sociology, 37 (3): 219-238,

Franklin, A.S, and John Urry (2001) ‘The Tourist Gaze and Beyond: An Interview with John Urry´ Tourist Studies, 1 (2):115-131.

Franklin, A.S, 1998) ‘Naturalizing Sports: Hunting and Angling in Modern Environments’, International Review for the Sociology of Sport, 33 (1): 355-366.

Franklin, A.S, 1997) 'An Unpopular Food? The Distaste for Fish and the Decline of Fish Consumption in Britain’, Food and Foodways, 7(4): 227-264..

Franklin, A.S,(1996) 'Australian Hunting and Angling Sports and the Changing Nature of Human-Animal relations in Australia', Australian and New Zealand Journal of Sociology. 32(3), 39-56.

Franklin, A.S,(1996) 'On Fox hunting and Angling: Norbert Elias and the Sportisation Process', Journal of Historical Sociology, 9(4): 432-456.

Franklin, A.S, (1990) 'Ethnography and Housing Studies', Housing Studies, 5 (2): 92-111.

Franklin, A.S, (1990) 'Housing Finance in Bristol', with G. Bramley, C. Lambert & W. Bartlett (all University of Bristol), Housing Research Findings, 20: 1-4. .

Franklin, A.S, (1989) 'Working class privatism and the home: an historical case study of Bedminster, Bristol', in Environment and Planning D: Society and Space, 7 (1): 93-113. 1
