= Andy Muirhead =

Australian former radio and television presenter

- Born: Andrew Robert Muirhead; 1975 (age 50–51); Sale, Victoria, Australia
- Occupations: Radio and television presenter, comedian, biologist
- Years active: 2004–2010

Andrew Robert Muirhead (born 1975) is an Australian former radio and television presenter for the Australian Broadcasting Corporation. He was the presenter of ABC Radio Hobart's breakfast program in Tasmania and also the presenter of the Collectors television program from 2005 to 2010. In 2012, he pleaded guilty to accessing child pornography and served four months of a five-month jail sentence.

== Career ==
Muirhead had worked in TV and radio since 2004 and had also performed comedy prior to the convictions. He represented Tasmania in the 2003 Raw Comedy National finals and had appeared at the Melbourne International Comedy Festival from 2004 prior to the convictions.

== Personal life ==
Muirhead was born in Sale, Victoria and moved to Hobart, Tasmania with his family. He graduated from the University of Tasmania in 1998. He worked as a biologist for a forestry company doing insect and mammal surveys while also doing stand-up comedy. He lived in Hobart with his long-term partner prior to the convictions.

=== Child pornography conviction ===
Andy Muirhead
- Status: Released after four months with remissions
- Conviction: Guilty
- Criminal charge: Access child pornography
- Penalty: Five months' imprisonment and good behaviour bond

In June 2010 he went on unpaid leave and production of Collectors was temporarily suspended when he was charged with one count of accessing child pornography. Production of Collectors resumed in July without Muirhead, and repeats of episodes featuring him were pulled from the ABC's schedule. He was bailed and pleaded not guilty in February 2011. The case was referred back to the Magistrates Court for 1 August 2011. The hearing on that day lasted only an hour rather than the expected two days and was adjourned again. Appearing in court again on 13 March 2012 he pleaded not guilty and the case was adjourned to 14 May 2012, then again to June 2012.

On 31 July 2012, represented by barrister Kim Baumeler, Muirhead pleaded guilty. He was remanded in custody by Ewan Crawford, Tasmanian Chief Justice. On 14 August 2012 the sentencing was adjourned until 7 September 2012, with Muirhead again remanded in custody. On 1 October he was sentenced to 19 months in prison. His sentence was subsequently reduced to five months and security of $5,000 for a three-year period of good behaviour. He was released after four months of the sentence following routine therapy and community service.

== Post conviction ==
A scandal involving the use of video material featuring Muirhead in New South Wales public schools occurred in 2019. A video featuring Muirhead presenting Collectors had been used as a teaching resource for an unknown number of distance education students across New South Wales and formed part of the material in the Year 10 History course that was sent out to distance education students studying through Camden Haven High School on the NSW mid-north coast. A spokesperson for the NSW Department of Education said the DVD of the episode had been withdrawn and other distance education centres that used the course material were made aware so that they no longer used it. The matter became public knowledge after a parent had reported the matter to the school and had spoken to the ABC; the parent reported that a teacher had told him the DVD had been used "for years".
