= Centre for Device Thermography and Reliability =

Research center in Bristol, England

- Established: 2001; 25 years ago
- Academic affiliations: University of Bristol
- Endowment: £2.6m(2012-13)
- Director: Martin Kuball
- Deputy Director: Michael Uren
- Academic staff: 18
- Administrative staff: 3
- Location: Bristol, England; 51°27′23″N 02°36′16″W
- Website: www.bristol.ac.uk/physics/research/cdtr

The Centre for Device Thermography and Reliability is a research facility at the University of Bristol, a research university located in Bristol, United Kingdom. Founded in 2001, by Professor Kuball the centre is engaged in thermal and reliability research of semiconductor devices, in particular for microwave and power electronic devices. It is housed in the H. H. Wills Physics Laboratory, a noted physics laboratory associated with the Physics department of the university. The centre is noted for developing an integrated Raman-IR thermography technique to probe self-heating in silicon, GaAs and other devices. This enables unique thermal analysis of semiconductor devices on a detailed level not possible before. These techniques are critical in understanding the reliability of Compound semiconductor devices applicable in power and microwave devices and in the long term as a viable replacement for Silicon devices as it approaches the end of scaling.

The institute gets funding from various government and private sector sources, such as European Space Agency and Engineering and Physical Sciences Research Council.

== Solid state device research ==
The H.H. Wills Physics Laboratory, named after Henry Herbert Wills, is the home of the department of Physics of the university. Former heads of department include Sir Charles Frank (crystal growth, liquid crystals) and Nobel Laureates C. F. Powell (whose discovery of the π meson marked the birth of modern particle physics), and Sir Nevill Mott. The Aharonov-Bohm effect and the Berry phase are also Bristol discoveries. The School carries out research in the fields of Astrophysics, Correlated Electron Systems, Micro and Nanostructural Materials, Nanophysics and Soft Matter, Particle Physics, Quantum Photonics and Theoretical Physics. The school is a principal stakeholder in the university's £11 million Centre for Nanoscience and Quantum Information and the £3 million Centre for Device Thermography and Reliability. The laboratory is one of the quietest laboratories in the world.

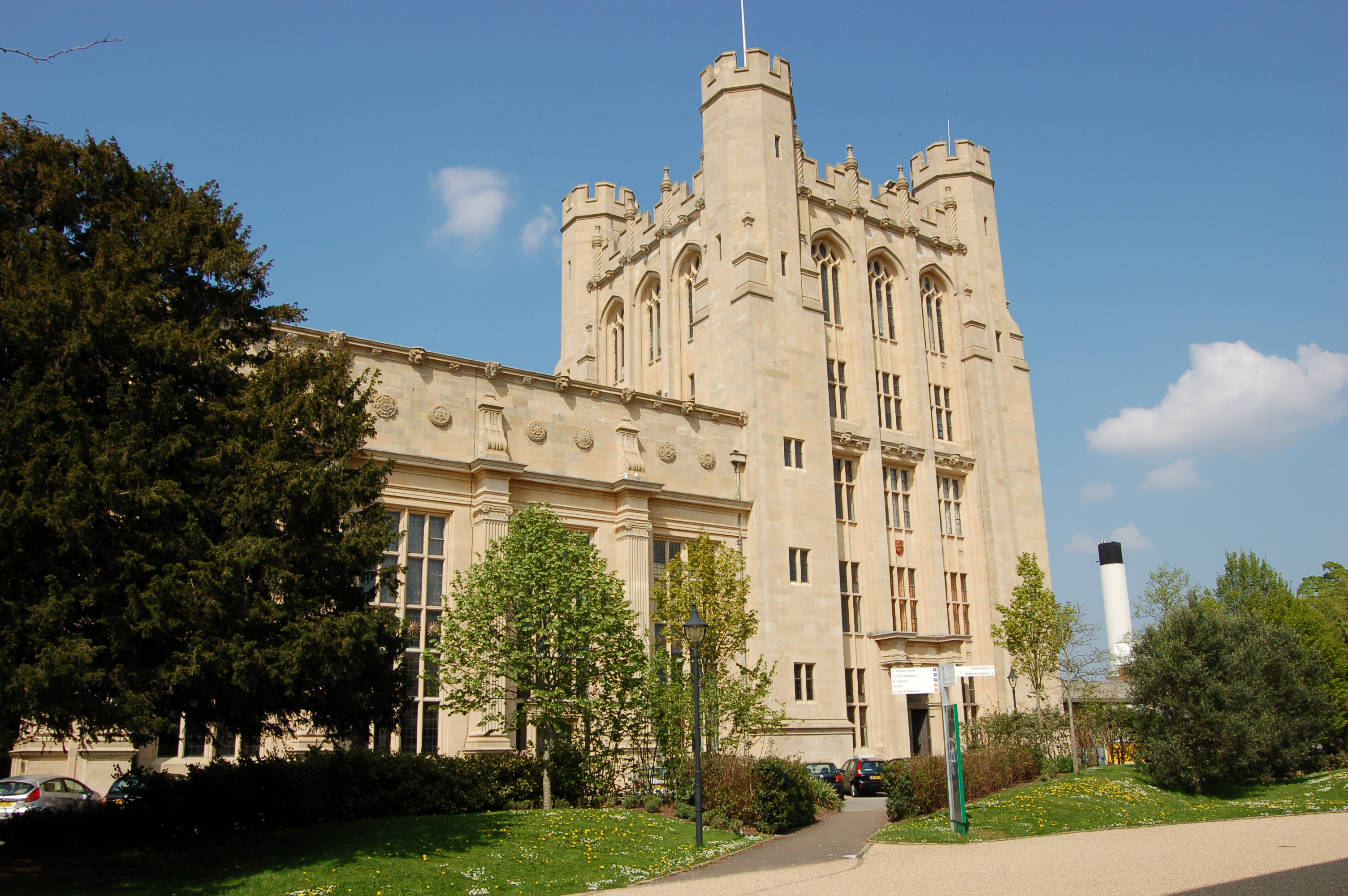
The CDTR is housed in the H. H. Wills Physics Laboratory

== Research ==
The centre carries out in research in the following areas.

- Microwave and Power electronic devices
- Thermal management research
- Electronic Device Performance and Reliability
- Device Simulation
