= Collectors (TV series) =

- Presented by: Andy Muirhead (2005–10); Claudia Chan Shaw (2010–11)
- Starring: Adrian Franklin; Claudia Chan Shaw; Gordon Brown; Justin Murphy; Niccole Warren; Lauren Carpenter
- Theme music composer: Tom Vincent
- Country of origin: Australia
- Original language: English
- No. of seasons: 6

Production
- Executive producers: Alison Black; Colin Grubb
- Production location: Tasmania
- Running time: 27 minutes

Original release
- Network: ABC1
- Release: 24 March 2005 – 23 September 2011

Collectors is an Australian television series that was shown at 8:00 pm on Friday on ABC1 and repeated at 6:00 pm on Monday on ABC2. It investigated a variety of collections from museums and private collectors. It was hosted by comedian Andy Muirhead, a former biologist, and featured a panel of experts: Sydney-based fashion designer Claudia Chan Shaw, antiques dealer and restorer Gordon Brown, and professor of sociology Adrian Franklin. The panel formerly included museum curator Niccole Warren and Lauren Carpenter. Past guests have included former Australian immigration minister Amanda Vanstone, former Australian federal opposition leader Kim Beazley, and musician Pete Cooper from The Porkers.

On 11 June 2010, it was reported that host Andy Muirhead had been charged with one count of accessing child pornography. Collectors was off-air for a month and Muirhead took unpaid leave during proceedings. The website for the show was also taken down temporarily. These actions have been criticised for giving an impression of guilt. It was announced the following week that the show would return without Muirhead in July. In October 2012, Muirhead was sentenced to 10 months in jail for child pornography offences after pleading guilty in July 2012.

Collectors returned on 9 July 2010 without Muirhead as host. Hosting duties were largely taken by Chan Shaw and repeats of the episodes of the show featuring Muirhead were pulled from programming schedules to be replaced with the new episodes.

In August 2011, the ABC announced that Collectors would be "rested" following a strategic review of the network's arts programming. The last episode in the series aired on 23 September, with the team behind the show producing a new program called Auction Room for 2012.

On 20 November 2012, the ABC announced that it would be closing its Tasmanian production unit. The managing director of the ABC, Mark Scott, stated, "Tasmania does not have the scale and market to justify the high fixed costs involved in maintaining an internal television production unit and associated labour and infrastructure". Collectors and Auction Room were confirmed to not be recommissioned.

== Segments ==
Each show was made up of a number of segments:

Under the Hammer
Former journalist and auction expert Justin Murphy journeys to auctions where he selects an object for the panel to bid on. The panelist who is closest to the eventual price wins the segment for the week. This has been replaced mostly with a similar segment in which the panelists buy items which are then sold on at auction, seeing who can get the least profit from them.
Passionate Collector
A passionate collector is profiled
Mystery Object
The panel is presented with an obscure object.
Roving Eye
Gordon Brown investigates antique furniture and other collectibles. This was discontinued in the 2009 series.
My Obsession
Profile of a collector with a specific focus on one kind of highly organised collection.
Show and Tell
Viewers send in photographs of objects and the panel identifies and values the object.
Collector Cam
Viewers send in videos detailing their collections. This is a competition and the winner's collection (voted by viewers) is displayed at the end of the year at the National Museum of Australia in Canberra. This segment was discontinued at the end of 2006.

Reports by various panel members on certain areas of collecting were also included in most episodes.
