= Greet Van den Berghe =

Dutch physician and researcher

- Born: 1960 (age 65–66)
- Education: KU Leuven
- Awards: FWO Excellence Prize (2015); International Excellence in Endocrinology Award (2020); European Medal (2021)
- Scientific career
- Fields: Intensive care medicine Endocrinology
- Workplaces: KU Leuven; UZ Leuven

Greet Van den Berghe (born 1960) is a Belgian physician and intensive care researcher. Since 2002 she has been the head of the Department of Intensive Care of the University Hospital of Leuven and head of the Laboratory of Intensive Care Medicine at the Faculty of Medicine, KU Leuven. Her research has focused on the endocrine and metabolic responses to critical illness, including blood-glucose control and nutritional support in intensive care.

== Biography ==
Born in 1960, Van den Berghe studied medicine at KU Leuven in Belgium and the University of Bristol in the UK and graduated in 1985. After 5 years of training, she received a board certification as Specialist in Anesthesiology and Resuscitation in 1989 and after an additional year of specialization she was board certified as "Intensive Care Specialist". In 1994, she completed a doctoral thesis on "Dopamine and Pituitary Hormones in Critical illness" and received the title of PhD.

Her main research focus has been endocrinology, metabolism and nutritional management of ICU patients. In 2001, she led a randomised study of surgical intensive-care patients which reported that intensive insulin therapy reduced morbidity and mortality. Her research group subsequently conducted studies on the timing of artificial nutrition in intensive care. She helped design the adult EPaNIC trial and was a co-author of its main report. The study found that delaying parenteral nutrition until the eighth day of intensive care was associated with faster recovery and fewer complications than beginning it earlier. She was also the senior author of the international PEPaNIC trial, which examined the same question in critically ill children. The trial reported that withholding parenteral nutrition during the first week of intensive care resulted in fewer new infections and shorter intensive-care stays than providing it early.

== Honours and awards ==
- Member of the Royal Academy of Medicine of Belgium (1999).
- Fellow of the Royal College of Physicians of Edinburgh (2011).
- Member of the German National Academy of Sciences Leopoldina (2013).
- Honorary member of the European Society of Intensive Care Medicine (2013).
- FWO Excellence Prize for Clinical Biomedical Sciences (2015).
- Elected member of Academia Europaea (2015).
- International Excellence in Endocrinology Award from the Endocrine Society (2020).
- European Medal from the Society for Endocrinology (2021).
