= Winifred Shapland =

First female Registrar of a British University

Winifred Shapland (centre) presentation of a bouquet on appointment as "England's first Lady Registrar of a University" at the Victoria Rooms, from the Horfield & Bishopston Record, 9 January 1931

Winifred Shapland (1886–1963) was the first female Registrar of a British University, and advocate for widening participation in higher education. In 1935 she described that "Bristol University women are excellent examples of the 'go-ahead spirit' of the female sex in every University in England." She was called a "pioneer in the world of higher education" in the Times Higher Educational.

== Life and career ==
Shapland was born in Bristol in 1886 and was educated at Colston's Girls' School. Her parents were Mary Rosa and William Tapp Shapland, of 139 Cumberland Road, freemason lodge master and traffic manager of the Bristol Docks; she had one sister and two brothers.

Shapland worked at the University of Bristol from 1909 until 1950. Her first role was as secretary to the institution's first Vice-Chancellor, Sir Isambard Owen. In 1928 she became Secretary to the University. In 1931 she was appointed University of Bristol Registrar, its most senior professional services role, a position she held for 20 years until her retirement. Her appointment as Registrar and being the first female Registrar of a British University were both described as "significant achievements."

Shapland received an honorary M.A. from the University in July 1939 to a "specially enthusiastic burst of applause"; it was noted she was still the only woman to be a Registrar at a British University at this point. She retired in July 1950 following 40 years service. 300 people attended her leaving presentation in the Great Hall where she was presented with funds from a subscription of 600 people from all over the world; a letter of thanks was read out from the chancellor, once and future Prime Minister Winston Churchill.

A contemporary obituary on 31 December 1963 said "of Miss Winifred Shapland the University has lost one of its best-known and most loyal servants." Her tribute read:

"She abhorred personal recognition and publicity but some thousands of students and staff of the University over the years visited her personally for advice and help, and men, and women in all walks of life in Bristol turned to her for information concerning matters far beyond the confines of the University. She presented a severe figure to the junior members of the University office and academic staff, but was insistent that the highest standards of work and conduct must be maintained."

Shapland's concise style was noted by a journalist reporting on her receipt of an honorary degree: "the recognition of fine service by Miss Winifred Shapland had given general satisfaction. This lady is respected by all associated with the University and by the journalist of Bristol too, because she invariably says 'Yes' or 'No' in a pleasant, courteous way to inquiries that have been made."

Shapland died in December 1963 at Clevedon.

== Legacy ==
Professor Judith Squires with Winifred Shapland (right) in 2019

In 2019 Shapland was named by the University of Bristol as one of 10 women who had "changed the institution – and, indeed, the world." University of Bristol Pro-Vice-Chancellor Professor Judith Squires said Shapland shaped the University into the institution it is now.
