= Martin Kuball =

German-born scientist

- Education: Max Planck Institute for Solid State Physics (PhD)
- Awards: Otto-Hahn-Award for Young Scientists (1995); He Bong Kim Award (2010); Royal Society Wolfson Research Merit Award (2015); TechWorks Group of the Year Award (2017); Royal Academy of Engineering Chair in Emerging Technologies (2020)
- Scientific career
- Fields: Wide-bandgap semiconductors including GaN, Ga_{2}O_{3}, and Diamond; Power electronic materials and devices; RF electronic materials and devices; Thermal management; Device reliability
- Workplaces: University of Bristol
- Thesis: Effects of Surfaces, Doping and Electrical Fields on the optical and electronic properties of GaAs (1995)
- Doctoral advisor: Manuel Cardona
- Website: www.bristol.ac.uk/physics/research/cdtr/

Martin Kuball is the chair of the Royal Academy of Engineering in Emerging Technologies, professor in physics at the University of Bristol, United Kingdom, and director of the Centre for Device Thermography and Reliability (CDTR).

== Education ==
Kuball received his Diplom from the University of Kaiserslautern, Germany and his PhD from the Max Planck Institute for Solid State Physics, Stuttgart, Germany, During his PhD he worked with Manuel Cardona. Prior to joining the University of Bristol he was Feodor Lynen Fellow of the Alexander von Humboldt Foundation at Brown University working with Arto Nurmikko.

== Career and research ==
Kuball is known for his research into thermal characterization and reliability of electronic materials and devices, with particular focus on wide-bandgap semiconductors, and RF and power electronic devices. He pioneered techniques such as Raman thermography, based on Raman spectroscopy, to determine temperature in devices with submicron spatial resolution and nanosecond time resolution, and numerous other techniques for the thermal and electrical characterization of materials and devices including for understanding device reliability. Raman Thermography was used by multiple companies to qualify GaN transistor technology for space applications. In 2019, he founded TherMap Solutions to commercialize techniques he developed and is presently its chief business officer.

He presently leads the £5M EPSRC Programme Grant GaN-DaME which develops GaN-on-Diamond technology for ultra high power RF devices, and the £2M EPSRC Platform grant MANGI which implements this technology for next generation internet applications.

== Awards and honours ==
In recognition for his achievements, Kuball was awarded a Royal Academy of Engineering chair in emerging technologies, was elevated to fellow of the Institute of Electrical and Electronics Engineers, of the Materials Research Society, of Society of Photo-Optical Instrumentation Engineers, Institution of Engineering and Technology and the Institute of Physics. Kuball has also won numerous awards including the Otto-Hahn-Award for Young Scientists in 1995, He Bong Kim Award in 2010, Royal Society Wolfson Award, in 2015, and TechWorks Group of the Year Award in 2017
