= Advanced Engineering Informatics =

Academic journal on digital applications in civil engineering

- Discipline: Engineering Informatics
- Language: English
- Edited by: Edward Huang and Nan Li

Publication details
- Former names: Artificial Intelligence in Engineering & International Journal for Artificial Intelligence in Engineering
- History: 1986–present
- Publisher: Elsevier
- Open access: Hybrid
- Impact factor: 9.9 (2024)

Standard abbreviations
- ISO 4: Adv. Eng. Inform.

Indexing
- ISSN: 0925-7535 (print); 1873-5320 (web)

Links
- Journal homepage; Online archive

Advanced Engineering Informatics is a peer-reviewed scientific journal published by Elsevier covering research on all aspects of advanced computing methods for engineering. The editors-in-chief are Edward Huang (Auburn University) and Nan Li (Tsinghua University). The journal was established in 1986 as the Artificial Intelligence in Engineering, with Kenneth J. MacCallum (Marine Technology Centre, Glasgow, UK) and Ram D. Sriram (MIT) as founding editors-in-chief. In 2002, the aims and scope of the journal were expanded, and the journal obtained its current name.

== Abstracting and indexing ==
The journal is abstracted and indexed in:

- CAB Abstracts
- Current Contents/Engineering, Computing & Technology
- EBSCO databases
- Ei Compendex
- Embase
- Inspec
- ProQuest databases
- PsycINFO
- Science Citation Index Expanded
- Scopus

According to the Journal Citation Reports, the journal has a 2023 impact factor of 9.9.
