= Linda Tyfield =

British molecular geneticist

Linda Tyfield FRCPath
- Born: 1946 (age 79–80)
- Occupation: Clinical scientist

Linda Buell Tyfield (born 1946) is a clinical scientist.

Tyfield was educated at Timmins High and Vocational School, then studied nutrition and biochemistry at the University of Toronto and later at the University of Bristol, then worked on the biochemistry of inherited metabolic disease at Southmead Hospital, where she rose to be a consultant clinical scientist and head of molecular genetics and then head of the department of molecular genetics.

She served as chair of the Clinical Molecular Genetics Society from 2000 to 2004 and on various government advisory committees.

She has been elected a Fellow of the Royal College of Pathologists (FRCPath).
