= James Barrington-Brown =

South African aerospace engineer (born1964)

- Born: 1964 (age 61–62); United Kingdom
- Citizenship: South African
- Education: University of Bristol
- Occupations: Aerospace engineer and Business executive
- Known for: Aerospace engineering
- Title: Co-founder at NewSpace Systems, NewCraft Aerospace, and Cape Constellation

James Barrington-Brown (born 1964) is a British-born South African aerospace engineer and entrepreneur. He is the founder and chairman of NewSpace Systems, a South African spacecraft components and subsystems manufacturer founded in 2013, which has offices in South Africa, the United Kingdom, the United States, and Netherlands.

Since 2025, Barrington-Brown is co-founder and Chief Revenue Officer at NewCraft Aerospace, an emerging South African commercial spacecraft manufacturer. And co-founder at Cape Constellation which functions as the collaborative physical ecosystem for early-stage African space technology companies.

In 2024, Barrington-Brown received the Innovator of the Year award in South Africa. He is a full Member of the International Academy of Astronautics. In 2019, he appeared among only 3 Africans recognized in the NewSpace People Top 200. He has authored and co-authored technical papers on spacecraft attitude determination and control, reaction wheel systems, and micro-vibration mitigation.

== Biography ==
James Barrington-Brown was born in 1964 in the United Kingdom. He completed his secondary education at St Edwards School, Oxford in 1983, and in 1986, he graduated with a Bachelor of Engineering in Electronics from the University of Bristol.

== Career ==
Barrington-Brown began his career in 1989 at Satellites International in the UK and held leadership roles in several aerospace companies, including Space Innovations, Analyticon, Nohmia Ltd., Satellite Services Ltd., and SSBV Space & Ground Systems. He also served as chairman of ASTOS, a UK aerospace trade association, from 2001 to 2013.

=== NewSpace Systems ===
In October 2013, Barrington-Brown founded NewSpace Systems, where he served as CEO until July 2024 before becoming global chairman. NewSpace Systems is a joint venture between South Africa's Space Commercial Services Holdings and the Dutch company SSBV Aerospace and Technology. Reportedly the company has a cleanroom facility in the Western Cape that adheres to European Space Agency manufacturing standards.

NewSpace Systems develops spacecraft components and subsystems, including control sensors and actuators for operational missions and satellite constellations. In 2024, the company had exports to over 33 countries across six continents. In March 2015, NewSpace acquired the assets of SSBV Space & Ground Systems Ltd. and became the sole supplier of their space product line. In 2019, he appeared among only 3 Africans recognized in the NewSpace People Top 200, ranking 171st.

=== Cape Constellation and NewCraft Aerospace ===
Following his departure from executive duties at NewSpace Systems in 2025, James Barrington-Brown with Yvette Barrington-Brown co-founded NewCraft Aerospace, an emerging South African commercial spacecraft manufacturer and Cape Constellation. Cape Constellation functions as the collaborative physical ecosystem for early-stage African space technology companies.

== Views ==
At the 2nd African Space Generation Workshop in 2018 in Mauritius, Barrington-Brown stated that he believed Africa could become "the next China in 20 or 30 years," citing its ability to adopt and accelerate existing technologies.

In a 2024 interview with Business Report, Barrington-Brown highlighted the role of business mentors in addressing the challenges faced by founders and described incubators as key environments for collaboration and accelerated growth among start-ups.

== Publications ==
Since 1999, Barrington-Brown has authored and co-authored technical papers on spacecraft attitude determination and control and micro-vibration mitigation among others. His publications also include contributions to reaction wheel design optimization and launch load prediction for soft-suspension systems.

== Recognition ==
- 2016: Pera award winner.
- 2018: FNB Business Innovation Awards finalists.
- 2019: He appeared among 3 Africans recognized in Newspace People top 200 Global leaders.
- 2024: He won Innovation of the Year Award by EOY South Africa.
- 2025: He became a full member of the International Academy of Astronautics (IAA) in Sydney.
