= Malcolm Wood =

British-Chinese entrepreneur and restaurateur

- Born: Taipei, Taiwan
- Education: University of Bristol
- Occupation: Restaurateur
- Known for: Co-founder of Maximal Concepts & Far North Productions
- Title: Managing Director

Malcolm Wood is a British-Chinese entrepreneur and restaurateur, in 2023, Wood was voted one of Asia's Most Influential People He is the Founder and Managing Director of Steelhead Group and Maximal Concepts, a restaurant and hospitality group best known for its flagship restaurant brand, Mott 32. He has been involved in documentary films about environmental issues, including A Plastic Ocean and The Last Glaciers.

== Early life and education ==
Wood was born in Taipei, Taiwan and is of Chinese and English heritage. He spent his early years in Taiwan, but lived in multiple places throughout his childhood, including Hong Kong, India, Italy, Canada, and London. He attended university at the University of Bristol in England, and has earned degrees in finance and financial law.

== Career ==
While still in university, he met Matt Reid, and the two formed a business partnership in hospitality which has spanned 20 years. A few years later, they founded Maximal Concepts in 2011. They opened their first restaurant under the Maximal Concepts umbrella, Blue Butcher, that year in Hong Kong. Through Maximal Concepts in 2014, Wood co-founded Mott 32, a Cantonese restaurant also based in Hong Kong. After winning Inside Festival's World Interior of the Year Award in 2014, the restaurant brand has since expanded with locations in Las Vegas ,Cebu, Dubai, Seoul, Bangkok, Vancouver, and Singapore, with a new venue opening in Toronto in April 2024. Around the world, Mott 32 has won multiple awards for its interiors and signature cuisine, often named as the best high-end Cantonese cuisine. As of 2024, the restaurant group has developed over 40 other brands, including Brick House, Limewood, Stockton, Sip Song and John Anthony.

He is passionate about sustainability and finding the balance between doing good and doing business and appears regularly on podcasts talking about business and sustainability. Dedicated to Environmentalism, in 2019, he was named a member of the United Nations Environment Programme's climate change awareness campaign, Mountain Heroes. He also sits on several conservationist boards including the Plastic Oceans Foundation and Hong Kong Shark Foundation. He is currently an athlete and brand ambassador for the apparel company, Arc'teryx, and watch company, Vacheron Constantin.

== Personal life ==
Wood is married to Sandra Wood and has two children.
