= National Institute of Chemistry =

Public research institute in Ljubljana, Slovenia

Coordinates: 46.0427°N 14.4936°E

Logo of the National Institute of Chemistry: Atoms

The National Institute of Chemistry (in Slovene: Kemijski Inštitut) in Ljubljana is the second largest natural sciences research institute in Slovenia (the country's largest being the Jožef Stefan Institute). Research at the National Institute is divided into two major fields: life sciences and materials science. Among its 11 departments, the Department of Materials Chemistry (D10) is the biggest department in the field of materials science.

== History ==
The institute was established in 1946 as part of the Slovenian Academy of Sciences and Arts with the purpose of developing technologies for processing coal into coke that was needed in the heavy industrialisation period of Slovenia's history after the Second World War.

In 1953 it was renamed the Boris Kidrič Institute of Chemistry in honour of the first president of the Slovenian socialist government, Boris Kidrič (1912–1953).

In 1956 the institute's first infrared spectrometer (a Perkin Elmer 21) was purchased, which made it possible to begin in-depth research in various fields of the Institute’s activities.

In 1992, following the country’s independence Slovenia's National Centre for High-resolution NMR Spectrometry (known as the NMR Centre) was established at the institute.

== Employees and equipment ==
The institute's ~460 employees, of which ~200 have PhD degrees, perform cutting edge research work using equipment such as a Karl Zeiss Supra 35 VP Electronic Microscope with EDX analysis, a high resolution powder x-ray diffractometer, an 800 MHz NMR spectrometer and a cryo-TEM microscope Glacios™; these are the only ones of their kind in Slovenia. The NMR spectrometer is the first of this kind of instrument to be found in the new member states of EU.

== Major achievements ==
One of the institute's major achievements of recent years is a 2013 synthetic protein that folds itself into a tetrahedron — a pyramid with a triangular base measuring just 5 nanometres along each edge - which can be used as container for delivering drugs on a nanoscopic scale. It was synthesized by Roman Jerala.
