= Institute for Social Anthropology =

Research institute based in Vienna, Austria

- Institut für Sozialanthropologie
- Predecessor: Ethnologische Kommission
- Formation: November 22, 1961
- Location: Vienna, Austria
- Leader: Stephan Kloos
- Parent organization: Austrian Academy of Sciences
- Staff: 32 (2021)
- Website: www.oeaw.ac.at/isa

The Institute for Social Anthropology (ISA; Institut für Sozialanthropologie) is a research institute of the Austrian Academy of Sciences (AAS) in Vienna, Austria.

== Tasks and Aims ==
The Institute for Social Anthropology is an Asia-specialized research institute at the AAS. Its long-term research focus lies on "Consensus and Conflict in Asia and the Eastern Mediterranean". Special emphasis is placed on transnational developments in Asia, such as regional integration and cooperation, transformations of family and kinship relations, as well as regional and internal migration.

ISA’s medium-term research program (2021-2023) is entitled “Uncertainties and Inequalities: Engaging with Asian Movements in the Present and Past ”. This research program directs ISA’s focus to Asian social, cultural, political and religious movements, as well as movements of people, knowledge, and objects in, through and from Asia. It further develops ISA’s previous research agenda between 2012 and 2020, which dealt with “crisis, mobility and transformation”. By emphasizing uncertainties and inequalities, which are powerfully connected with contemporary crises and movements (from environmental crises and pandemics to migration, economic development, and various religious and political movements), this research program covers some of socio-cultural anthropology’s core concerns. As critical guiding orientations, the key concepts of uncertainty, inequality, and movements are empirically applied in and across ISA’s three main regions of research: the Middle East, Tibetan/Mongolian regions and Central Asia, Southeast Asia and Islands of the Indian Ocean. They pertain to both contemporary and historic times, and carry particular potential for inter- and transdisciplinary collaboration in the humanities, social and life sciences.

Prof. Regina Bendix is the current chair of ISA’s Scientific Advisory Board for the term 2018-2021.

== History and Structure ==
The roots of the current Institute for Social Anthropology can be traced back to March 2, 1938, when the erstwhile Commissions for "Research on Illiterate Languages of Non-European Peoples" and for "Publishing Songs and Texts Recorded in Prisoner of War Camps" at the Austrian Academy of Sciences were merged into the new "Commission for Research on Primitive Cultures and Languages." As the Commission’s research focus increasingly turned to complex societies, in line with developments within anthropology at the time, it was renamed "Ethnological Commission" on November 22, 1961. In the years between 1955 and 1965, Prof. Robert Heine-Geldern established a focus on the region of Southeast Asia for the first time in the history of AAS.

From 1980 to 2000 Prof. Walter Dostal substantially expanded the already existing focus on Southeast Asia by two additional core fields – South-Western Arabia and Tibet. A second institutional merger took place under Prof. Walter Dostal on January 1, 1993, when the "Arabic Commission" was integrated into the Ethnological Commission, resulting both in an interdisciplinary approach that provided a strong foundation for research on intercultural relations, and in a special emphasis on language competency in its anthropological work.

As it became clear that the term "ethnos" did not adequately capture anthropology’s research focus on the human anymore, the Commission for Ethnology was renamed, on January 18, 1995, to "Commission for Social Anthropology." Since 1995, this socio-anthropological research approach follows an interdisciplinary program by conducting empirical and ethnographic investigations in connection with philological and historical analyses and intercultural comparative studies of socio-cultural phenomena. The award of the Wittgenstein prize to Prof. Andre Gingrich in the year 2000 marked the start of a new era at the Commission.

On January 1, 2007, the "Commission for Social Anthropology" was transformed into a Research Unit as part of the "Center for Studies in Asian Cultures and Social Anthropology," and awarded temporary institutional status as the "Institute for Social Anthropology" on January 1, 2010. Following a successful external evaluation, it was granted permanent status on September 15, 2011. In 2019, founding director Andre Gingrich retired, and Stephan Kloos took over as interim director.

Today, the Institute for Social Anthropology constitutes one of the Austrian Academy of Sciences’ flagship institutes in the humanities and social sciences, and counts among the top European research institutions in anthropology.

== Regional foci ==
ISA’s regional foci and expertise encompass: 1) the Islamic Middle East and North Africa, 2) primarily Buddhist Central Asia and the Tibetan language-speaking Himalayan regions, as well as 3) Southeast Asia and the islands of the Indian Ocean.

Researchers on the Middle East examine, inter alia, social transformations and conflicts of South-Western Arabia past and present and the memory of crimes against humanity among Kurdish people. In Central Asia, Tibet and the Himalayan region, staff carry out research on imperial-time and early Buddhist Tibet, Tibetan medicine, material culture, mobility, nomadism and memory. Ongoing projects in the region of Southeast Asia and the islands of the Indian Ocean range between the role of social media in religious practices, health-related tourism, the nexus of gender and economy in mainland Southeast Asia, environmental frictions, mobilities, and peace movements.

Methodologically, ISA pursues gender-sensitive ethnographic fieldwork carried out in local languages and systematic cross-cultural comparison in its analyses and interpretations of socio-cultural processes in the past and present.

== Events ==
Since 2002, ISA has co-organized the international Eric Wolf Lectures in collaboration with the Department of Social and Cultural Anthropology of the University of Vienna and the International Research Center for Cultural Studies (IFK). Every year, a prominent representative of the discipline is invited to hold a public lecture. Since 2004, the Eric Wolf Lectures are published in Current Anthropology.

About eight times a year, the institute organizes its ISA International Guest Lectures, for which ISA invites researchers from all relevant fields and well-established lecturers.

Every two years, ISA organizes an "International Anthropological Atelier" – a special workshop together with another European anthropological institute in order to share, discuss, and develop preliminary results of ongoing research. The outcomes of the workshop are published as an edited volume or a special focus section in a leading journal of the field.

ISA’s Research Forum is meant primarily as an internal forum for staff members of ISA or partner institutions to present new projects as well as the results of ongoing or already completed research.

Occasionally, ISA organizes or co-organizes domestic as well as international conferences and seminars on theoretical-methodological debates, special topics, or regional agendas. In 2004, ISA co-organized the 8th EASA Biennial Conference, in 2011 the GAA Conference 2011, and in 2015 the 8th EuroSEAS Conference as well as the 11th CHaGS Conference in Vienna.

== Publications ==
Since 1996, ISA publishes the book series "Veröffentlichungen zur Sozialanthropologie" ("Publications in Social Anthropology"). This series is available from the Austrian Academy of Sciences Press.

Since 2008, AAS Working Papers in Social Anthropology appear several times a year. This series is available online and open access on the institute’s homepage.

Another publication is the book series "Sammlung Eduard Glaser", which is also available from the Austrian Academy of Sciences Press.
