= Centre for Nanoscience and Quantum Information =

Research center in England

Centre for Nanoscience and Quantum Information @ The University of Bristol

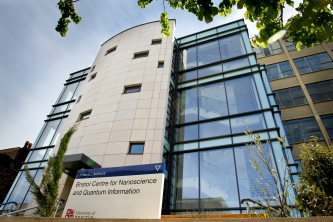
- Nickname: NSQI
- Established: 7 September 2009
- Research type: Basic; Applied; Unclassified
- Field of research: Nanotechnology; Nanomaterials; Nanotoxicology; Quantum information; Quantum optics
- Director: Prof. Meryn Miles, FRS
- Faculty: Science; Engineering; Medicine & Veterinary Science; Medicine and Dentistry
- Staff: 6
- Location: Bristol, England, UK; 51°27′32″N 02°36′6″W
- Affiliations: Bristol Centre for Functional Nanomaterials (BCFN) Doctoral Training Centre; California NanoSystems Institute (CNSI)
- Operating agency: University of Bristol
- Website: www.bristol.ac.uk/nsqi-centre/

The Centre for Nanoscience and Quantum Information (abbreviated NSQI) is a research center within the University of Bristol. The center opened in 2009 and was initially intended to serve multiple institutions; however, it was eventually absorbed into the School of Physics of the University of Bristol in 2016. The building was designed to provide a unique ultra-low-vibration research space, with some claims calling it "the quietest building in the world".

== The Building ==
=== Building layout ===
The building has four floors, housing the following facilities:

- The basement is for the most audio-sensitive experimental tasks. It houses seven low noise labs, two ultra-low noise labs, an anechoic chamber, a class 1000 cleanroom, and three prep labs.
- The ground floor houses Quantum Information labs, staff offices, a seminar room, and a foyer.
- The first floor houses offices for researchers, students and operations staff associated with QETLabs, the QE-CDT and affiliated quantum technologies groups.
- The second Floor houses a Quantum Engineering Technology lab, a main inter-disciplinary communal lab that includes a clean room area, several annex labs, and offices.
- The third floor is a maintenance floor, housing building infrastructure (water, electricity, steam, etc.).

=== Building design features ===
The building was designed by Architect Percy Thomas of Capita Architecture in 2004 and built by Willmott Dixon. The criteria set for the research space exceeded any standard vibration criterion curve, and required significant design and engineering solutions.

"The new Bristol Centre will serve as a commendable and viable construct for interdisciplinary research; its ultimate goal is to move to new shores and new territories."

Heinrich Rohrer, 2010, at the centre opening ceremony.

==== Low vibrations ====
The primary source of noise for researchers at the nanoscale is mechanical vibration. Activities within a building generate noise that can travel through the structure and vibrations created outside (such as from road traffic) can travel through the ground and enter the building. The following methods were employed to reduce vibration generation and penetration into the lab space:

- The main structure of the building is massive. It is built atop 2 meter thick concrete foundations and has thick concrete floors, measuring one-half meter of thickness.
- All plant machinery is housed on the third floor, as far from the low-noise lab space as possible.
- All services and plant machinery is suspended on springs, rubber pads or damper pads to reduce coupling between the mechanism and the building.
- All services are balanced to reduce turbulence within pipe and ductwork.
- All corridors are floating, separate from the main structure, stopping vibrations crossing the floor and major foot traffic from affecting the building.
- The lift shaft is decoupled from the building structure.
- The building is decoupled from the building next door.
- All services pass through a flexible hose coupling before entering the low noise labs.
- All Low noise labs have a seven tonne concrete isolation block set on damper pads, within the ground slab.
- Both ultra-low noise labs have either a 23-tonne or 27-tonne concrete isolation block supported by pneumatic rams. The block is T-shaped in cross-section, to keep the center of gravity lower (reducing wobble within the block). The block is surrounded by a floating floor to allow researchers to inhabit the room without disturbing their measuring equipment.
- Labs have an adjacent control room. Control equipment can be removed from the labs and installed in the neighboring control room. The control room has its own isolation block and is heavily soundproofed. Conduits allow cables to run between the labs, allowing experiments to be overseen from control rooms for their duration.

==== Soundproofing ====
Experimental rooms are far from the busy University precinct, dug underground and in an area that is not used for teaching or as thoroughfare routes. The thickness of the floor ensures that little sound penetrates across, and the walls between labs and doors of the labs are soundproof. Plant machinery being located on the top floor further reduces noise, and the services are tuned as precisely as possible to reduce any sounds from the water supply, chilled water system or air vents.

==== Low electrical noise ====
Many of the experiments in the center involve recording small electrical currents (as low as a few picoamps). External electrical noise disturbs the measurements. Each basement research lab is designed as a Faraday cage, and all service pipework changes to plastic before entering the lab. For the data network, optical fiber is used instead of copper cabling. All labs are also supplied with an independent earth contact and 'clean' power supply, the mains having been filtered by a 1:1 transformer.
