= Mike Fraser (computer scientist) =

British computer scientist

- Born: 1975 (age 50–51)
- Education: University of Nottingham
- Awards: FRSA
- Scientific career
- Fields: Computer science
- Workplaces: University of Bath; University of Bristol; University of Nottingham
- Website: www.cs.bris.ac.uk/~fraser/

Mike Fraser FRSA (born 1975) is a British computer scientist. He is Head of Computer Science at the University of Bristol.

== Life and career ==
Fraser was a student at University of Nottingham from 1993 until 1996 where he acquired his bachelor's degree in Computer Science. He also attained a PhD in Computer Science from the same institution during 1997 and 2000.

After graduating, he worked as a lecturer at the University of Nottingham from 2001 to 2004, before he moved to Bristol and became a senior lecturer at the University of Bristol from 2004.

In 2012, Fraser became a Professor of Human-computer interaction.

In 2019, he was made Head of Computer Science at the University of Bath , before returning to the University of Bristol in 2022.

Fraser's research is often based around his specialisation in Human-computer interaction.

His first PC was an Amstrad CPC 464.

== Awards and recognition ==
Fraser sits on the steering committee of the TEI conference series, was awarded a ‘best paper’ award at ACM CHI 2005, and is a Fellow of the Royal Society of Arts.
