= List of judges of the Supreme Court of Tasmania =

Tasmanian judiciary

Of the judges who have served on the Supreme Court of Tasmania as of 19 December 2017, including Chief Justices and Puisne Judges: 13 had previously served in the Parliament of Tasmania, Algernon Montagu, Thomas Horne, Valentine Fleming, Francis Smith, William Lambert Dobson, William Giblin, John Stokell Dodds, Robert Patten Adams, Andrew Inglis Clark, Herbert Nicholls, Norman Ewing, Richard Green and Merv Everett.

In addition, Norman Ewing and Merv Everett had previously served in the Australian Senate, while Alexander Macduff Baxter had previously served in the New South Wales Legislative Council.

John Pedder and Thomas Horne served in the Tasmanian Legislative Council while serving as judges, while Thomas Horne was elected to the Tasmanian House of Assembly after his judicial service.

Position	Name	Appointment commenced	Appointment ended	Term in office	Comments	Notes
Chief Justice	Sir John Pedder	4 March 1824	4 May 1854	30 years, 61 days		
Chief Justice	Sir Valentine Fleming	7 August 1854	31 December 1869	15 years, 146 days		
Chief Justice	Sir Francis Smith	8 August 1870	7 February 1885	14 years, 183 days		
Chief Justice	Sir William Lambert Dobson	7 February 1885	17 March 1898	13 years, 38 days		
Chief Justice	Sir John Stokell Dodds	29 October 1898	26 June 1914	15 years, 240 days		
Chief Justice	Sir Herbert Nicholls	1 July 1914	31 October 1937	23 years, 122 days		
Chief Justice	Sir Harold Crisp	21 December 1937	14 April 1940	2 years, 115 days		
Chief Justice	Sir John Morris	15 April 1940	3 July 1956	16 years, 79 days		
Chief Justice	Sir Stanley Burbury	28 August 1956	29 October 1973	17 years, 62 days		
Chief Justice	Sir Guy Green	30 October 1973	1 September 1995	21 years, 306 days		
Chief Justice	William Cox	4 September 1995	1 December 2004	9 years, 88 days		
Chief Justice	Peter Underwood	2 December 2004	28 March 2008	3 years, 117 days		
Chief Justice	Ewan Crawford	24 April 2008	7 April 2013	4 years, 348 days		
Chief Justice	Alan Blow	8 April 2013		13 years, 190 days		
Judge	Algernon Montagu	31 January 1833	31 December 1847	14 years, 334 days		
Judge	Thomas Horne	1 January 1848	1 November 1860	12 years, 305 days		
Judge	Sir Francis Smith	1 November 1860	7 February 1885	24 years, 98 days		
Judge	Sir William Lambert Dobson	8 August 1870	17 March 1898	27 years, 221 days		
Judge	William Giblin	7 February 1885	17 January 1887	1 year, 344 days		
Judge	Robert Patten Adams	14 March 1887	31 May 1898	11 years, 78 days		
Judge	Andrew Inglis Clark	1 June 1898	14 November 1907	9 years, 166 days		
Judge	John McIntyre	20 October 1898	30 June 1914	15 years, 253 days		
Judge	Sir Herbert Nicholls	1 January 1909	31 October 1937	28 years, 303 days		
Judge	Edward Dobbie	1 January 1914	28 August 1915	1 year, 239 days		
Judge	Sir Harold Crisp	1 August 1914	14 April 1940	25 years, 257 days		
Judge	Norman Ewing	23 September 1915	19 July 1928	12 years, 300 days		
Judge	Andrew Inglis Clark, Jr.	31 August 1928	20 February 1952	23 years, 173 days		
Judge	Wilfred Hutchins	1 November 1938	23 March 1950	11 years, 142 days		
Judge	Sir Richard Green	1 June 1950	19 March 1961	10 years, 291 days		
Judge	Marcus Gibson	2 May 1951	11 January 1968	16 years, 254 days		
Judge	Sir Peter Crisp	21 March 1952	1 March 1971	18 years, 345 days		
Judge	Sir George Crawford	10 November 1958	11 December 1981	23 years, 31 days		
Judge	William Ellis Cox	28 March 1961	15 March 1963	1 year, 352 days		
Judge	Frank Neasey	18 March 1963	13 September 1990	27 years, 179 days		
Judge	David Chambers	27 February 1968	24 September 1978	10 years, 209 days		
Judge	Robert Nettlefold	2 March 1971	15 May 1990	19 years, 74 days		
Judge	Henry Cosgrove	2 February 1977	23 September 1988	11 years, 234 days		
Judge	Merv Everett	7 November 1978	14 March 1984	5 years, 128 days		
Judge	Cecil Brettingham-Moore	21 March 1984	14 March 1986	1 year, 358 days		
Judge	William Cox	2 February 1982	1 December 2004	22 years, 303 days		
Judge	Peter Underwood	20 August 1984	28 March 2008	23 years, 221 days		
Judge	Christopher Wright	29 April 1986	7 March 2000	13 years, 313 days		
Judge	Ewan Crawford	5 October 1988	7 April 2013	24 years, 184 days		
Judge	Bill Zeeman	30 May 1990	10 March 1998	7 years, 284 days		
Judge	Pierre Slicer	3 June 1991	18 September 2009	18 years, 107 days		
Judge	Peter Evans	10 June 1998	7 June 2013	14 years, 362 days		
Judge	Alan Blow	13 June 2000		26 years, 124 days		
Judge	Shan Tennent	15 March 2005	3 November 2017	12 years, 233 days		
Judge	David Porter	26 May 2008	21 May 2016	7 years, 361 days		
Judge	Helen Wood	9 November 2009		16 years, 340 days		
Judge	Stephen Estcourt	8 April 2013		13 years, 190 days		
Judge	Robert Pearce	11 June 2013		13 years, 126 days		
Judge	Michael Brett	11 July 2016		10 years, 96 days		
Judge	Gregory Geason	16 November 2017	12 November 2024	8 years, 333 days	Resignation due to impending criminal charges.	
Judge	Tamara Jago	1 November 2021		4 years, 348 days		
Master	Joseph Hone	1824	1851	26–27 years		
Master	Cecil Brettingham-Moore	1960	20 March 1984	23–24 years	Appointed a judge	
Master	Richard Southee	1985	1999	13–14 years		
Master / Associate Judge (Note: On 1 March 2008 the title "Master" was changed to "Associate Judge")	Stephen Holt	6 September 1999	31 August 2023	23 years, 359 days		
Associate Judge	Michael Daly	29 April 2024		2 years, 169 days		

== See also ==
- Judiciary of Australia
