= Private timber reserve (Tasmania) =

A private timber reserve is an area of privately owned land, used or intended to be used, for growing timber within the Australian state of Tasmania.

Landowners can have their land declared as a Private Timber Reserve and protect their right to use private land to grow timber. Private land or freehold land refers to land registered under Torrens title. A landowner is the person(s) and/or legal entity registered on the Torrens Title.

Private Timber Reserves are unique, with no other State in Australia, or internationally, providing the land owner with protection of their rights to use their planted land, land they intend to plant or native forests areas, to grow timber.

Growing timber is long term investment with trees often taking decades to grow to maturity. Forest and tree owners need certainty that they will be able to harvest in the future. Securing the right to use land to grow timber provides some certainty that the owner will be able to harvest in the future.

In the Australian State of New South Wales, landowners can apply to have timber plantations authorised as 'complying plantations' and have a guaranteed right to harvest. This guarantee is only extended to plantation, not native forests or land intended to be planted.

== Extent ==
There are 1,094,000 hectares of private land in Tasmania covered by forest or plantation (841,000 hectares of native forests and 253,000 hectares of plantation) As June 2023, 429,094 hectares were declared as Private Timber Reserve.

The estimates for the area of private land covered by native forests or plantation, and areas declared as Private Timber Reserve may include areas not covered by trees. Such areas include; rocky areas, glades, firebreaks, roads, and swamps, and are found within boundaries of the forest or plantation owned by individual land owners. All estimates of forests area, and area of land declared as Private Timber Reserve, use a number of methodologies to calculate area.

The State of Tasmania has 3.706 million hectares of forests (3.362 million hectares of native forests, 0.331 million hectares of plantation and 0.33 million hectares of other forest) covering 54% of the State.

There are 27.1 million hectares of private forest in Australia (16% of forest area privately owned). Only 13.9% of the World's forest is privately owned.

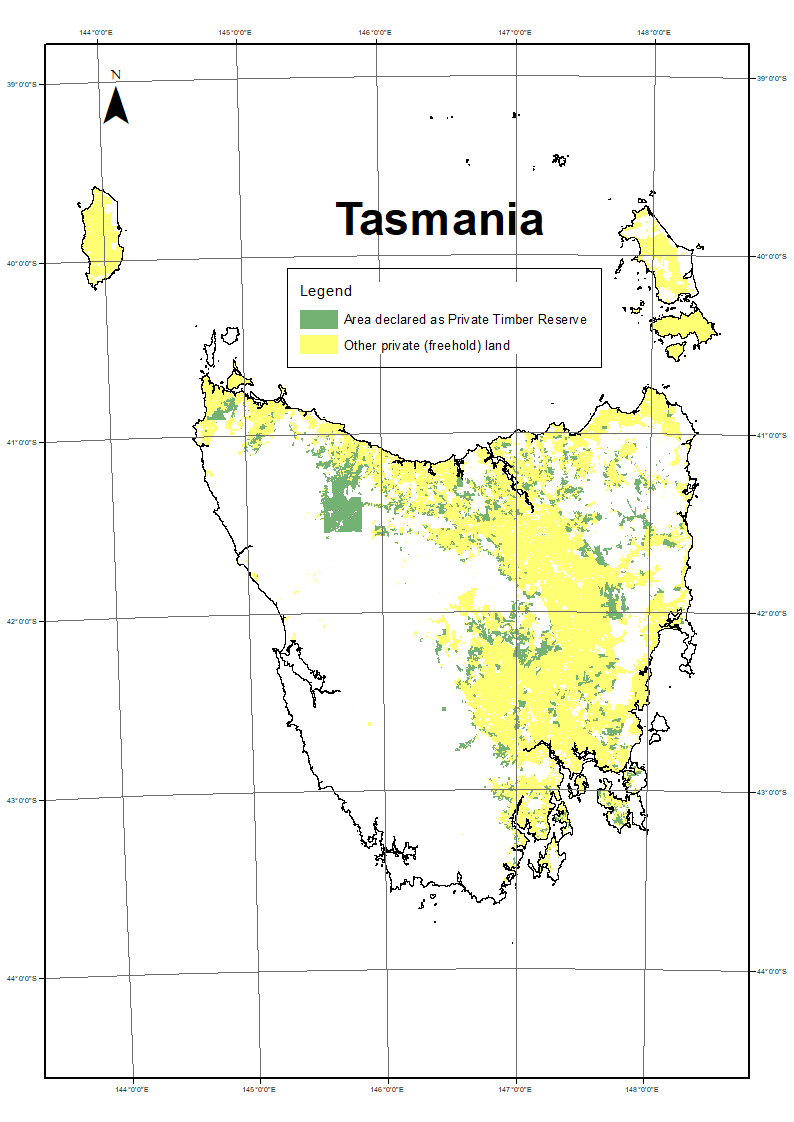
Location of Private Timber Reserves - as at November 2023

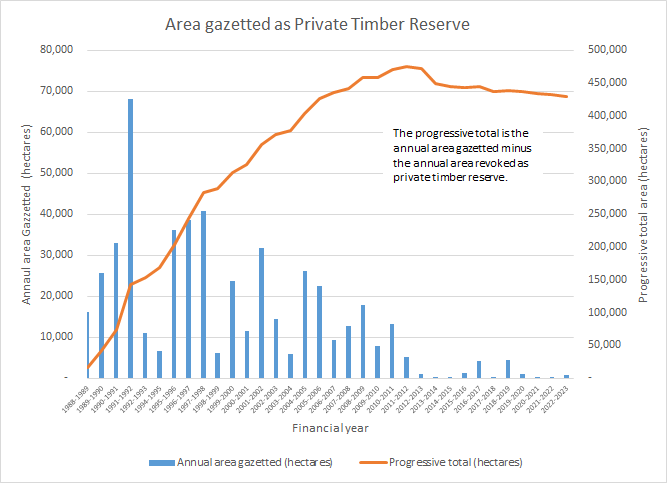
Area of land declared as a Private Timber Reserve in Tasmania, as at 30 June 2023

== Recent trends ==
The number of applications to declare land as a private timber reserve has declined considerably since 2012-2013. In 2011-2012, the progressive total for the area declared was 475,321 hectares. There is a continuing decline in the area of Private Timber Reserve 2011-2012 to 2022-2023 as the area revoked exceeds the area declared.

The reason for land owners to revoke the private timber reserve is reported as being;

Change to pasture-agriculture	67%
Harvest and no intent to replant	10%
Sale of property	9%
Forestry use discontinued	5%
Other land-use	4.5%
Conservation Covenant	4%
Other reasons	0.5%

The failure of forestry management investment schemes resulted in collapse of trust in investments in plantation on private land. Coupled with the impacts of the 2008 financial crisis there a major decline in the forest products markets.

The continuing decline post the 2008 financial crisis has not been studied.

== Legal definition ==
Private Timber Reserve is land that has been declared as a Private Timber Reserve under Section 11 of the Forests Practices Act 1985. The Act was passed by both Houses of the Tasmanian Government in 1985, and received Royal Assent 25 May 1985, with a commencement date of 2 November 1987 for Part II – Private Timber Reserves.

Land declared as a Private Timber Reserve is "used only for establishing forests, or growing or harvesting timber in accordance with the Forest Practices Code and such other activities which the Authority considers to be compatible with establishing forests, or growing or harvesting timber". The activities considered to be compatible are; apiary sites, education and scientific purposes, grazing under well established trees, hunting, nature based recreation.

The declaration of the Private Timber Reserve is registered on the land title as per Section 15 of the Forests Practices Act 1985 The declaration of the Private Timber Reserve remains with the title(s), despite changes in ownership, or until an application to revoke is submitted by the landowner and approved. A landowner can make an application to revoke all or part of the area declared as a Private Timber Reserve, at any time.

A Private Timber Reserve is an area of land, used or intended to be used, for growing timber. It could be an area of native forest, plantation (exotic and native species) or land intended to be used to grow timber. The land has to be capable of growing timber. The minimum area that can be declared a Private Timber Reserve is five hectares.

Timber means trunks and branches of trees, whether standing or not, and all wood. This definition includes the full range of wood products; all categories of saw logs, veneer logs, pulpwood and firewood.

=== Local planning schemes and private timber reserve declaration ===
Local planning schemes created under the Land Use Planning and Approval Act 1993 can not be used to zone an area, declared as a Private Timber Reserve, to make timber growing a prohibited activity or place conditions on the activity. On land declared a Private Timber Reserve, local government authority development applications for operations, subject to an approved Forest Practices Plan, are not required.

Consultation is still required under the Forest Practices Code with the local government authority when Forest Practices Plan are being prepared.

=== Applications ===
The process to declare an area a Private Timber Reserve is set out in the Part II of the Forest Practices Act 1985.

The landowner completes an application form, and informs anyone who has an interest in the land or the trees as per Section 5 of the application. Landowners can declare any part or all their land a Private Timber Reserves.

The application is in two parts, Part A to be completed by the Applicant (landowner) and Part B, completed by a person authorised by the Forests Practices Authority Board. Part B of the Application requires details on vegetation cover, and on any natural or cultural values on the area. A Private Timber Reserve can only be declared over an area where forestry activity can be undertaken in accordance with the Forest Practices Code.

Private Forests Tasmania assesses the application and makes a recommendation to the Board of the Forest Practices Authority that the Private Timber Reserve be granted, or not. Private Forest Tasmania has a delegation under the Forest Practices Act 1985 – Part II PRIVATE TIMBER RESERVES, from the Board of the Forest Practices Authority to accept, assess and make recommendations on applications to declare and revoke land as private timber reserve

The declaration of the land as a Private Timber Reserve is registered on the land title, and can be declared over a whole title or over part of a title.

Application fees apply. Section 5 (2)(d) Forests Practices Act 1985 requires that, "an application to declare land as a private timber reserve must be accompanied by a fee". Originally the cost per application was AUD$100 (prior to 1999) with a fee of AUD$350 introduced in 1999–2000. The fee increase followed an instruction from the Government that the fee should cover the costs of processing the application.

The application fee is subject to annual increase under the Fee Units Act 1997. An application to declare land as a Private Timber Reserve attracts 350 fee units. Currently the fee unit is AUD$1.78 for the period 2023-2024 plus the cost of registering the declaration on the land title.

The Crown Solicitor charges a fee to register the Private Timber Reserve on the land title, AUD$104.50 (including GST) if a Private Timber Reserve covers only full titles, and an additional AUD$104.50 (including GST) if a Private Timber Reserve covers part of the land title listed in the application as well.

=== Forest practices plans ===
Section 18(2)b of the Forest Practices Act 1985 states that a forests practices plan is to " contain, in the case of a private timber reserve, or where the owner of the land referred to in the plan wishes to restock the land with trees, specifications in connection with the restocking of the land with tree".

A forest practices plan can not be certified for an area declared as a Private Timber Reserve, unless the reforestation section of the plan contains restocking requirements.

=== Land tax ===
Under the Land Tax Act 2000 landowners in Tasmania are subject to annual land tax, based on land value.

If the land meets the definition of Primary Production Land or PPL classification applies to land as at 1 July in any year, then the owner of that land is not required to pay land tax for that land in that financial year. Land declared as a Private Timber Reserve under section 11 of the Forest Practices Act 1985 and advertised in the Tasmanian Government Gazette is eligible for PPL classification and no land tax is payable.

== Rationale ==
The 'Report of the Board of Inquiry into Private Forestry Development in Tasmania 1977' recommended that; "That statutory provisions be made for a 'dedication' scheme in relation to private land based broadly on the British scheme which has operated since 1947 and that direct financial assistance be provided by the Government within the framework of the scheme."

The Report authors recognised the need, and potential return to the industry and State, if assistance was provided to private forest owners. Such assistance was proposed to be provided to owner who had dedicated their land for forestry. Like the British scheme the aim was to encourage the proper management of native forests.

The Board also discussed the illogical distinctions drawn by finance companies between moneys available for clearing of forests and agriculture and for forestry. Investment funds for forestry were difficult to obtain. In summary, the need to secure investment in private forestry was recognised and the dedication of a private timber reserve was a key element to securing that investment, either from the government or the private sector.

=== Forest Practices Act (1985) ===
When the Bill for the Forest Practices Act was introduced into the Tasmanian Parliament in April 1985, the Minister for Forests, Robin Gray, referenced the Private Forestry Council recommendation to create the "concept of private timber reserve".

Part II provides for a concept of private timber reserves, a unique process to encourage private forestry. It will assist to develop an adequate private forest estate to help ensure that the forest-based industries have the necessary future resource. It provides an opportunity for a landowner to volunteer his forest for registration as a private timber reserve. This has the effect of ensuring that forestry is an approved long term land use in the event that a universal planning scheme covers the area and that he may therefore be assured of the opportunity to harvest his forest having grown it for many years. There is provision for compensation where a landowner is prevented from harvesting his timber when he intended to create a private timber reserve.

On the introduction of the Forest Practices Act 1985 amendments were made to sections 756 and 759 of the now repealed.

In the Local Government Act 1962 Section 756, provided local government with the power to terminate certain non-conforming uses under a planning scheme. If a use was terminated a landowner had to seek approval to use their land, even if the use of the land use had not changed. The Forest Practices Act 1985 amendment meant land declared as Private Timber Reserve was one land use where the power to terminate non-conforming uses did not apply. The other uses, where the power to terminate non-conforming uses does not apply, were; the site of a dwelling house or land used for agriculture, horticulture, viticulture, pasture, or similar purpose.

The 1985 amendment of Section 758 of the Local Government Act 1962, provided for the land declared as Private Timber Reserve to be treated as a lawful use of land. This meant that land used for forestry had same status as land used for agriculture.

These amendments were deemed necessary because the use of the land for forestry purposes is not obvious. It is relatively simple to recognise land used for housing and agriculture, and hence continuing use, because the land contains buildings or crops or livestock. The use of an area of forest, used for forestry purposes, is infrequent and the period between any activity may span decades.

=== Forest Practices Act & the 1993 Land Use Planning and Approvals Act ===
There was a need to ensure that 'continuing use' be recognised was also addressed in the new planning Act Land Use Planning and Approvals Act 1993 introduced in 1993.

Under the Land Use Planning and Approvals Act 1993 on land: where use has stopped for 2 years or more periods; or which has stopped for 2 or more periods which together total 2 years in any period of 3 years; or in the case of a use which is seasonal in nature, if the use does not take place for 2 years in succession; is subject to the operation of a planning scheme or interim order.

Forestry has a pattern of land use where there is activity when planted or regenerated occurs, and then years later when thinning or harvesting occurs. It is often not apparent that in the period between planting/regeneration and any harvest, the land is being used to grow timber. The direct reference to Private Timber Reserves was necessary otherwise the pattern of use of land for forestry, could have resulted in the land being subject to planning schemes and interim orders, without the fact the land was being used for forestry, and had been for decades, being recognised.

Land Use Planning and Approvals Act 1993 requires local government authorities to create planning schemes and zone land for uses. Areas of land were zoned for forestry use as a permitted use. Other areas of land where forestry occurred, but not zoned with forestry as a permitted used, required a development permit from the local government authority. These development permits do not provide any certainty that the land owner would be able to harvest the wood grown. Permits are usually issued for native forest harvest and regeneration, or to establish a plantation, but did not explicitly create the right to harvest at a latter date.

In Section 20 (7) of the Land Use Planning and Approvals Act 1993;

Nothing in any planning scheme or special planning order affects (a) forestry operations conducted on land declared as a private timber reserve under the Forest Practices Act 1985.

Section 20(7) also applies to mineral exploration, fishing and marine farming operations. Forestry, mineral exploration, fishing and marine farming are not subject to the provisions of planning schemes.

It is possible for a landowner to apply for a Private Timber Reserve, where under a local planning scheme forestry is a use permitted or where a permit is required. A Private Timber Reserves cannot be declared over an area where forestry is prohibited.

== Forest Practices Tribunal ==
Under Section 9 of the Forests Practices Act 1985 an appeal can be made to the Forest Practices Tribunal against a refusal to grant, or the granting of a Private Timber Reserve. Twenty eight appeals were lodged with the Tribunal, 7 were upheld and 21 dismissed.

In two Appeals, the Appellant offered no proof to the Tribunal hearing. In five other appeals the decision to refuse the application was upheld by the Tribunal. This refusal provided the applicant the opportunity to seek compensation under Section 16 of the Forests Practices Act 1985. Under Section 16, where a refusal of an application for a private timber reserve by the Tribunal, on grounds referred in Section 8 (2) (d) or (e), entitles the land owner to compensation for the value of the timber crop growing on the land.

The Meander Valley Council appealed to the Tribunal on nine occasions, and was successful on only one appeal (TASPFT 10 1997). The nine appeals include two appeals where no proof was provided to the Tribunal. In these two appeals the Council appealed to the Tribunal but provided no proof or submission to the Tribunal to support their appeal.

An additional three Tribunal hearings were held to consider costs. In two cases, the Tribunal directed each party pay their own cost and in one case costs were awarded to the Respondents.

The powers of the Forest Practices Tribunal, since July 2021, are vested in the Tasmanian Civil and Administrative Tribunal.

=== List of appeals to Forests Practices Tribunal ===
Citation	Date of decision	Appellant	Respondents	Upheld / dismissed	Notes
[1996] TASFPT 2.	2 October 1996	Break O'Day Council	Forest Practices Board and Glynd Management Pty Ltd	Dismissed	Reference number for declared Private Timber Reserve – PTR 0491
[1997] TASFPT 2.	7 May 1997	Meander Valley Council	Forest Practices Board	Dismissed	Application reference – BAR 527.
[1997] TASFPT 3.	15 May 1997	Meander Valley Council	SM White and Forest Practices Board	Dismissed	Application reference – WHI 767. No proof from the Appellant was tended.
[1997] TASFPT 4.	15 May 1997	Meander Valley Council	IH Swann and Forest Practices Board	Dismissed	Application reference – SWA 694. No proof from the Appellant was tended.
[1997] TASFPT 5.	11 June 1997	Break 0' Day Council	B & S Leatham	Dismissed	Application reference – FOR 588.
[1997] TASFPT 6.	12 August 1997	RT Tuson and Rex Tuson Pty Ltd	Forest Practices Board	Dismissed	Application reference – TUS 624. Appeal against refusal.
[1997] TASFPT 7.	10 September 1997	WJ Claridge	Forest Practices Board	Dismissed	Reference number for declared Private Timber Reserve – PTR 778. Appeal against refusal.
[1997] TASFPT 9,	16 October 1997	Beams Bros (Holdings) Pty Ltd	Forest Practices Board	Upheld	Reference number for declared Private Timber Reserve – PTR 676. Appeal against refusal.
[1997] TASFPT 10,	10 November 1997	Meander Valley Council	Forest Practices Board	Upheld	Application reference – AND 850.
[1998] TASFPT 2.	17 July 1998	PR McDonald	Forest Practices Board	Upheld	Reference number for declared Private Timber Reserve – PTR 925.
[1998] TASFPT 3.	13 August 1998	Glenorchy City Council	Forest Practices Board	Upheld	Application references – TAY 945a, 945b, 946a & 946b. Appeal against refusal. The decision of the Supreme Court of Tasmania dated 16 March 1998 found the Tribunal had no jurisdiction to declare a Private Timber Reserve on the land where approval to undertake forest operation was required.
[1998] TASFPT 4	1 October 1998	RK & DE Johns	Forest Practices Board	Dismissed	Application reference – JOH 955b. Appeal against refusal.
[1999] TASFPT 1	2 August 1999	Meander Valley Council	GM & EA Cubit, Forest Practices Board, Private Forests Tasmania and D & D Smith	Dismissed	Application reference – CUB 1003. Costs hearing.
[1999] TASFPT 3.	10 November 1999	GR & RA Linger	Forest Practices Board	Dismissed	Application reference – LIN 943. Appeal against refusal.
[2000] TASFPT 1.	19 January 2000	Meander Valley Council	Forest Practices Board	Dismissed	Reference number for declared Private Timber Reserve – PTR 1206. Costs hearing also held.
[2000] TASFPT 4.	7 September 2000	Meander Valley Council, J Hayward and Mrs P Finlay	Forest Practices Board & Alan James Andrews	Dismissed	Application reference – AND 850B.
[2000] TASFPT 5.	7 September 2000	Meander Valley Council and J Hayward	PR MacDonald	Dismissed	Application reference – MAC 1153.
[2000] TASFPT 6.	24 October 2000	G & T Brooks	J & K Burley	Dismissed	Application reference – BUR 1212.
[2002] TASFPT 2.	15 August 2002	S Carse, C Marriott and P & J Dolan	Forest Practices Board	Dismissed	Application reference – GUN 1368 & GUN 1363.
[2002] TASFPT 4.	20 December 2002	Armatos Pty Ltd	Forest Practices Board	Dismissed	Reference number for declared Private Timber Reserve – PTR 1419.
[2003] TASFPT 1.	10 October 2003	G J Louden and T D Tanner	Forest Practices Board	Dismissed	Application reference – ARN 1493.
[2004] TASFPT 1.	20 December 2004	C Flowers	Forest Practices Board	Dismissed	Reference number for declared Private Timber Reserve – PTR 1530. Appeal against refusal.
[2005] TASFPT 1.	2 February 2005	J&L Hayward	Forest Practices Board	Upheld	Application reference – AND 1372.
[2006] TASFPT 1.	31 January 2006	S Watson	Forest Practices Authority and GL Morgan	Dismissed	Reference number for declared Private Timber Reserve – PTR 1227.
[2006] TASFPT 3.	13 October 2006	Meander Valley Council, J & M Hawkes, N Hoffman, P A Elkin, J Leis, J King, and The Environment Association Joined	Forest Practices Authority and EE & IC Porter	Dismissed	Application reference – POR 1698. Costs hearing.
[2007] TASFPT 1.	24 October 2007	DW Clement obo TB O'Neill	Forest Practices Authority and RB Curran	Upheld	Reference number for declared Private Timber Reserve – PTR 1844.
[2009] TASFPT 1.	3 April 2009	A Ricketts	Tasmanian Plantation Pty Ltd and Forest Practices Authority	Upheld	Reference number for declared Private Timber Reserve – PTR 1893
[2009] TASFPT 2.	3 April 2009	DW Clement obo TB O'Neill	Forest Practices Authority and RB Curran	Upheld	Reference number for declared Private Timber Reserve – PTR 1844.

== Supreme Court ==
=== List of challenges to the Tasmanian Supreme Court ===
There have been a number of challenges to applications to declare areas as Private Timber Reserve lodged in the Tasmanian Supreme Court.

Citation	Appellant	Respondent	Judgement by	Hearing dates	Decision date	Issue	Decision
[2003] TASSC 60	HAYWARD, John & HAYWARD, Lynn	Forest Practices Tribunal & Private Forests Tasmania	Justice Slicer	4 February 16, 17 June 2003	22 July 2003	Judicial review of decision of Forest Practices Tribunal	Justice found Tribunal erred in approving application for private timber reserve
[2003] TASSC 102	HAYWARD, John & HAYWARD, Lynn	Forest Practices Tribunal & Private Forests Tasmania	Justice Slicer	11 September 2003	14 October 2003	Appeal against granting PTR 1372	Appeal upheld. Matter remitted to Forest Practices Tribunal.
[2004] TASSC 14	HAYWARD, John & HAYWARD, Lynn	Forest Practices Tribunal & Private Forests Tasmania	Justice Slicer	18, 19 June 2007	9 March 2004	Decision on costs in relation to [2003] TASSC 102	Costs awarded to Hayward.
[2007] TASSC 64	KING, John Michael	Forest Practices Tribunal	Justice Blow	18, 19 June 2007	22 August 2007	Appeal against granting PTR 1698	Appeal dismissed.
[2008] TASSC 1	KING, John Michael	Forest Practices Tribunal	Chief Justice Underwood, Justice Slicer, & Justice Tennent	31 October 2007	2 November 2007	Appeal against granting PTR 1698	Appeal dismissed.
[2008] TASSC 51	CURRAN, Robert	Forest Practices Tribunal	Justice Slicer	27 August 2008	5 September 2008	Appeal against granting PTR 1844	Appeal upheld. Matter remitted to Forest Practices Tribunal.

=== Justice Crawford decision (1998) ===
An application to declare an area a Private Timber Reserve was received in June 1997, and assessed as per the requirements the Act Section 8 (d) of the Forests Practices Act 1985 which sets the grounds for granting or refusing and application. The local government authority, the Meander Valley Council lodged an objection to the application as provided in the Section 7 of the Act Their ground for the objection was that forestry "would not be in the public interest" as allowed under Section 8 of the Act.

The Board of the Forest Practices Authority approved the application and the Meander Valley Council appealed the decision to the Forest Practices Tribunal under Section 9 of the Act.The Tribunal held a hearing on 13 October 1997, with the decision to dismiss the appeal delivered on 10 November 1997.

On 8 November 1997, the Meander Valley Planning Scheme 1995 came into effect and forestry become a prohibited activity on the land covered by the application. This meant on 8 November 1997, forestry was prohibited on the land and the decision of the Tribunal of 10 November was void. Under Section 8 (2) (d) of the Act refusal of an application is required if...

(d) by virtue of the operation of any Act, the owner of the land is prohibited from establishing forests, or growing or harvesting timber, on the land.

The planning scheme declaration on 8 November 1997 meant owner of the land was prohibited from establishing forests, or growing or harvesting timber, on the land.

In early February 1998, the Meander Valley Council registered an appeal against the decision of the Forest Practices Tribunal with the Tasmanian Supreme Court. The Crown did not contest the appeal as establishing forests, or growing or harvesting timber was prohibited on the land under the local planning scheme at 8 November 1997, two days before the Tribunal decision.

Justice Crawford on 16 March 1998 (M1 of 1998) concluded applications must be refused where forestry is a discretionary use and no permit has been issued, in addition to situations where forestry is prohibited use. The effect of this conclusion was that areas of land declared a Private Timber Reserve, where a permit was required to undertake forestry under a local planning scheme, "may now be held to be legally invalid".

==== Legal challenge ====
In June 1997, the Tasmanian Conservation Trust sought legal advice as to the implications of Justice Crawford's judgement. Their advice maintained that where a permit for forestry use is required under a planning scheme, and has not been obtained before the land was declared a Private Timber Reserve, the declaration of the private timber reserve was illegal.

The Board of Forest Practices Authority provided a brief statement on the issue for affected people. Private Forests Tasmania sent a letters to approximately 540 holders of Private Timber Reserves that may be affected, and all 149 current applicants (as at June 1997). All local government authorities were also informed of the position.

In July 1997, the Government announced it would pass legislation to validate private timber reserves (media release 15 July). The Opposition also expressed support for the proposal to validate private timber reserves.

The Tasmanian Conservation Trust applied to the Resource Management and Planning Appeal Tribunal on 8 September 1997, seeking to have all Private Timber Reserves declared after the introduction of the Land Use Planning and Approval Act 1993 to be revoked. Parties to the application were the Forest Practices Authority and Private Forests Tasmania, as respondents. A hearing was held 18 September 1997, when it was argued, and accepted, that land owners whose land had been declared as private timber reserve, post the introduction of the Land Use Planning and Approval Act 1993, should be informed of the proceedings. Private Forests Tasmania identified the land owners who could be affected by the Tribunal's decisions. A total of 980 applications, covering some 320,000 hectares, have been accepted to date (1997); with some 540 applications, involving 383 landowners, affected by any decision to revoke Private Timber Reserves approved after the introduction of Land Use Planning and Approvals Act 1993.

If successful, the Trust's application could have resulted in the majority of Private Timber Reserves, approved after the introduction of Land Use Planning and Approvals Act 1993 (9 November 1993) to be revoked. Some landowners may have had local government approval to undertake forestry activities prior to applying for a Private Timber Reserve, and hence would not be revoked. Of immediate concern was that Timber Harvesting Plans for areas declared as Private Timber Reserves, may be invalid, and may need local government planning permission. Any harvesting underway on Private Timber Reserves at the time, without planning permission, would have in breach of the provisions of the Land Use Planning and Approval Act 1993.

==== Legislative response ====
An amendment was made to Forest Practices Act 1985 whereby a requirement to obtain a permit to undertake forestry activities under the Land Use Planning and Approvals Act 1993 was deemed not to be a prohibition under Section 8 2(A) of the Forest Practices Act 1985.

In June 1999, Royal assent was given to the Forest Practices (Private Timber Reserves Validation) Act 1999. This Act validated Private Timber Reserves already declared.

=== Forests Practices Tribunal (2006) ===
An appeal against the approval of a Private Timber Applications from EE & IC Porter resulted in a hearing that heard evidence for 17 days There were six appellants Meander Valley Council, J & M Hawkes, N Hoofman, PA Elkin, J Lies, J King; The appellants were all "prescribed persons" under the Forest Practices Act Section 7(4) with three respondents; EE & IC Porter (landowners who submitted the application, and the Forests Practices Authority who approved the application. Other parties provided submissions to the appeal: Private Forests Tasmania, the Authority accepting and assessing the application; Gunns Ltd, a forestry company purchasing the wood from the landowner; The Environment Association, a local conservation group and Mr Lockhart, a local resident.

The Tribunal received 12 submissions in writing. These submissions often included expert advice and opinion from other parties. Each submission was then reviewed by all Appellants and Respondents, and submissions in reply lodged. In some cases, additional expert advice was included. During the hearing each party was then able cross examine witness, in particular expert witnesses, giving evidence. As result, in addition to the authors of the submissions from the Appellants and Respondents (12 persons), 17 persons were subject to cross examination.

==== Findings ====
The Tribunal dismissed the appeal and affirmed the decision of the Forest Practices Authority to approve the application.

During the hearing the appellants sought to have the decision of the Forest Practice Authority quashed because the application form for the Private Timber Reserve was not complete The Tribunal found this did not invalidate the application. The application process was changed by the Private Forests Tasmania, in conjunction with Forests Practices Authority, in 2006, and a two part application form was authorised.

This hearing is notable due to its length, and the extensive cross examination of witnesses. The Tribunal found:

284. The hearing of these appeals extended to some 17 days. Many hundreds of pages of submission were subsequently received from the parties. The length of cross examination of witnesses by many of the appellants and their representatives was a principal cause of this situation. The Tribunal, particularly because of the requirement of section 37(9)(c) that it conduct the proceedings with a little formality and technically, and with as much expedition as a proper consideration of the matter permits, ultimately limited the representative to cross examination of 60 minutes each per witness.

==== Appeal ====
An appellant, Mr King appealed the decision of the Tribunal to the Supreme Court pursuant to the Judicial Review Act 2000 Justice Alan Blow concluded that "No error of law on the part of the Tribunal", and dismissed the appeal.

King then lodged an appeal with the Full Court of the Supreme Court of Tasmania, where Chief Justice Underwood and Justices Slicer and Tennent unanimously dismissed his appeal.

== See also ==
- List of types of formally designated forests
