= Fabiano Cangelosi =

Australian lawyer (born 1987)

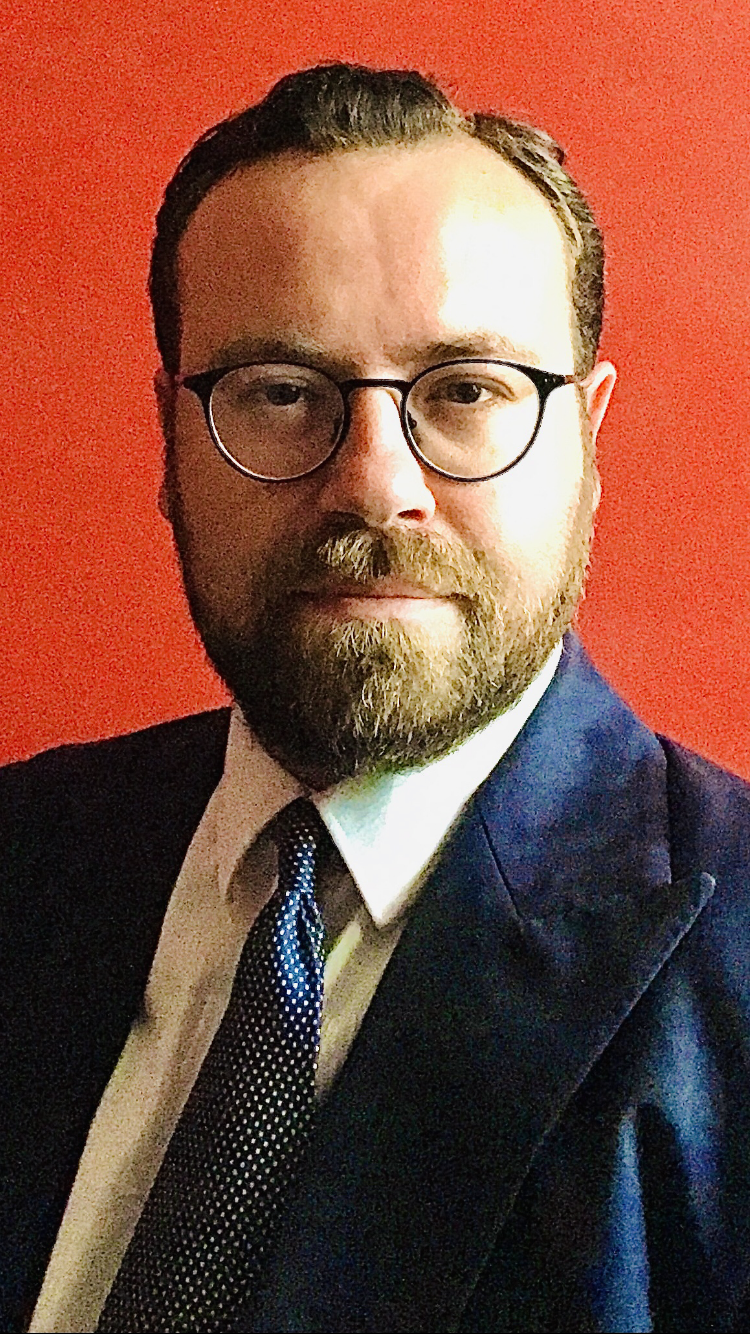
- Born: 21 February 1987 (age 39); Hobart, Tasmania, Australia
- Occupation: Barrister
- Years active: 2011–present
- Political party: Independent (since 2024); Labor (until 2024)

Fabiano Cangelosi (Italian: [faˈbjaːno kandʒeˈloːzi]; born 21 February 1987) is an Australian barrister and principal of The Cangelosi Firm, based in Hobart, Tasmania. Cangelosi has been involved in a number of high-profile cases, and was between 2018 and June 2020 the Tasmanian President and Director of the Australian Lawyers Alliance. Since August 2022, Cangelosi has been an occasional contributor to Crikey, writing on Tasmanian legal and political affairs.

== Education ==
Cangelosi graduated BA (hons) and BA-LLB (Hons LLB) from the University of Tasmania was admitted to practice in 2011, and practised at the Launceston firm Rae & Partners and the Hobart firm Simmons Wolfhagen until he was called to the bar in 2018.

== Cases ==
In 2016, Cangelosi appealed a decision of the Magistrates Court of Tasmania resulting in Supreme Court Justice Helen Wood ruling that a request given under the Police Offences Act 1935 for a person to state his or her name and address requires the police officer to make clear that the request is a legal requirement.

In 2017, Cangelosi represented several Chinese sailors who had been intercepted outside Australian territorial waters with over 100 kilograms of cocaine and towed to Hobart. Cangelosi alleged that his client had been denied an interpreter as a consequence an "extraordinary violation" of the man's rights had occurred.

In 2017, Cangelosi represented Meaghan Vass, a key witness in the ongoing controversy surrounding the murder of Bob Chappell by Susan Neill-Fraser. Vass had told Neill-Fraser's trial in 2010 that she had not gone aboard the yacht from which the deceased Bob Chappell had disappeared, but a statutory declaration made by her to the effect that she had been aboard the yacht and knew what had become of Bob Chappell had been supplied to police. During the hearing of the appeal it was alleged by the State of Tasmania that a former detective, Colin McLaren, had fabricated the statutory declaration and had come up with a plan to pay Vass $10,000 for adopting the declaration. It was also alleged that Neill-Fraser herself had attempted to cause Vass to sack Cangelosi, because Cangelosi was expected to ask Vass whether the statutory declaration was the product of coercion. The circumstances of his representation were themselves the subject of some controversy, with The Age reporting that Tasmania Police had informed Ms Vass’ lawyers that they want to interview her about perverting the course of justice in respect of the ongoing appellate proceedings launched by Neill-Fraser, and also wished to interview Cangelosi "about matters not subject to legal privilege, including when he was retained to act for Ms Vass, and by whom". Tasmania Police confirmed that correspondence in the possession of The Age was genuine, and Cangelosi declined to make any comment on the matter.

Also in 2017, Cangelosi conducted an unsuccessful appeal for Marco Daniel Rusterholz, convicted of the 2012 murders of Angela Hallam and Joshua Newman. The Court accepted that the circumstantial case against Rusterholz was not sufficiently strong to prove guilt beyond reasonable doubt, but found that the evidence of admissions made by Rusterholz to other persons, notwithstanding that they were persons potentially of very low credit, left the convictions as safe and reasonably open.

In 2019, Cangelosi represented convicted rapist and killer Jamie John Curtis after he was controversially granted parole, and then breached parole conditions by joining social media and dating services under a false name. At Curtis’ sentencing hearing, Cangelosi told the court that Curtis had "a late 1980s understanding of technology" and "a naive idea of what you can do with a mobile phone...He was born in 1955, jailed in 1986 and paroled last year. The result of that was that in 1986 when he went to jail, he knew of personal computers but he didn't have one...he had very limited use of a computer [in jail]. Emerging from jail he was essentially a person putting a foot into the 21st century with an understanding of technology from the 1980s." Cangelosi also told the court that the alias Curtis used was not created to avoid police detection, but rather because he was aware that he would be the target of unwanted attention because of his past crimes.

In 2020, Cangelosi represented Rebels Motorcycle Club State President Shaun Lee Kelly on a charge of evading police whilst riding a Harley Davidson. Magistrate Glenn Hay dismissed the charge, finding that police evidence of the events had been "highly fanciful, if not impossible."

Also in 2020, Cangelosi successfully argued a landmark case before the Full Court of the Supreme Court of Tasmania on behalf of Duc Van Nguyen, resulting in declarations not only shortening the period until Nguyen's parole eligibility by 15 months, but also likely shortening the sentences of other recidivist inmates serving multiple sentences with non-parole periods.

In 2022 Cangelosi argued that the Supreme Court of Tasmania should override the decision of a Coroner to refuse to hold an inquest into the notorious death by dangerous driving of Jari Wise, at the hands of his then-partner, Melissa Oates. The Supreme Court of Tasmania’s subsequent refusal to order that an inquest be held triggered the “extraordinary” intervention of Attorney-General Elise Archer, who directed that the inquest take place.

Also in 2022, Cangelosi successfully argued an appeal against conviction before the Court of Criminal Appeal of the Supreme Court of Tasmania for notorious prisoner Adrian Alwyn Pickett, with the court unanimously ruling that Pickett's conviction over a home invasion at Colebrook, Tasmania was unsafe. Pickett had been one of Tasmania's longest serving inmates, completing nearly 14 months of solitary confinement, for which he successfully sued the State of Tasmania in 2011.

In 2023, Cangelosi acted for Matthew John Davey in an appeal against conviction for the attempted murder of Davey’s partner, Nicole Evans. Cangelosi argued that the conviction should be quashed because “the evidence from the scene tended to support his client’s case”, that “there is a reasonable possibility that the applicant is an innocent person who has been convicted”, and that other evidence had resulted in a “tremendous unfair prejudice” despite being “of no assistance in determining the mechanism of the fire”. The appeal was refused.

In 2024, following the charging of Gregory Geason, a judge of the Supreme Court of Tasmania, with domestic violence offences including assault, it was reported that Tasmanian Attorney-General Guy Barnett was forced to withdraw a bill from the Parliament of Tasmania to establish an inquiry into Justice Geason’s conduct, after Cangelosi intervened, accusing Barnett of departing “from the convention by which the first law officer seeks to defend the judicial branch of government” by “prosecuting a political case”. Geason was subsequently tried and convicted of the assault of his former partner, with Deputy Chief Magistrate Susan Wakeling describing his evidence as “contrived”. During sentencing proceedings, Cangelosi sought a lenient sentence for Geason, saying that the judge had “lost everything… The destruction of his public image and professional life is total.” Geason was sentenced to 100 hours of community service and resigned as a judge.

In 2026, Cangelosi successfully defended the Salamanca Whisky Bar in one of the Tasmanian Magistrates Court’s longest running regulatory prosecutions for consumer law offences relating to allegations of substituting a fake version of a high-end local brand. The court had heard evidence of an attempted “undercover operation” involving Ron Goldschlager, Chairman of Sullivans Cove Distillery, and its distillers, Heather Tillot and Patrick Maguire, to obtain samples of whisky sold by the Salamanca Whisky Bar for chemical analysis. The court rejected the evidence from prosecution witnesses as “having significant issues with unreliability and credibility”.

== Political activity ==
=== Criticism of Tasmanian police ===
Cangelosi was critical in April 2018 of "Operation Saturate", a high-intensity policing strategy targeting low level crime committed by recidivist offenders, telling ABC News, "It puts a burden on the magistrates, it puts a burden on the courts, it puts a burden on the Legal Aid Commission, and it puts a burden on people who are being taken away from their homes, their jobs, their parents, their children, to sit in a cell for a few hours until the court eventually grants them bail." Tasmania Police Inspector John Ward responded to this, "I would also like those lawyers to ask those offenders they're representing to stop committing crime. It's as simple as that. We'd leave them alone then."

In response to an operation by Tasmania Police involving the "locking-down" of an entire suburb, amid criticism from the Tasmanian Greens of the policy, Cangelosi said "we hear Tasmania Police talk about increasingly sophisticated means of detecting crime and enforcing the law. Blockading a suburb is not a sophisticated way of detecting crime and enforcing the law.It is a brute force method and it is a waste of resources especially when we hear that all that has been detected is some very low level offending."

In August 2022, in the wake of revelations in the Supreme Court of Tasmania that Tasmania Police had illegally bugged a visiting room at Risdon Prison to record confidential and privileged communications between inmates and their lawyers, Cangelosi declared that “Tasmania Police engaged in a gross violation of confidential communications between inmates of Risdon Prison and their legal representatives”, and called for a “commission of inquiry into Tasmania Police practices in relation to seeking and executing warrants for the use of listening devices”.

=== Criticism of consorting laws ===
On 5 May 2018, following public consultation on laws designed to prohibit consorting amongst members of Outlaw Motorcycle Gangs, in an opinion piece published in The Mercury, Cangelosi argued:

After all, if a person does not agree with a law, democratic participation requires him or her to associate with others, and the people most likely to want to democratically agitate against a law are the people it directly affects. In the case of consorting laws, it is the democratic right of people who are or could be subject to consorting notices to associate with each other to bring about political opposition. The very existence of consorting laws tends to stifle the ability to exercise that democratic right to muster political opposition.

— Fabiano Cangelosi, An Attack on Freedom of Association, 8 May 2018

On ABC Radio on 22 May 2018, Cangelosi argued that the case had not yet been made that members of Outlaw Motorcycle Gangs were using gang structure to facilitate the commission of crime.

=== Public national sex offenders register ===
On 9 January 2019 Home Affairs Minister Peter Dutton announced support for a publicly searchable national register of sex offenders. In a heated debate, Cangelosi and Senator Derryn Hinch clashed first on ABC News over government support for Hinch's proposal for a national, publicly accessible database of sex-offenders. In a second debate on the same day Hinch's former radio station 3AW, Hinch remarked that "[Cangelosi] should get out in the real world. We’ve clashed before over this." Cangelosi told Hinch to look at available data and admonished Hinch for being unfamiliar with studies related to the success of such databases. Cangelosi discussed the issue further with Fran Kelly on 10 January 2019 on Radio National.

=== Other activities ===
When former Jihadist Muhammad Manwar Ali, due to attend the Dark and Dangerous Thoughts Symposium at Dark Mofo for a discussion with journalist Peter Greste, was refused a visa to enter Australia, Cangelosi was critical of the decision, remarking that it ran contrary to free speech.

On ABC Radio on 25 September 2019, in response to a proposal by Tasmanian Attorney-General Elise Archer to amend the Tasmanian Criminal Code to remove the defence of intoxication and to close a loophole allowing perpetrators of "one punch" incidents to escape punishment for causing death, Cangelosi remarked that the government "frighteningly does not understand the Criminal Code and does not understand the criminal law of Tasmania".

In response to measures taken by the Tasmanian government to COVID-19, Cangelosi publicly argued for a moratorium on prosecutions for minor drug offending, citing risk of prosecution as a reason for non-compliance with public health directives.

=== 2021 Tasmanian State Election ===
On 29 March 2021, Cangelosi was announced as one of the five candidates in the seat of Franklin for the Labor Party in the 2021 Tasmanian state election.

Cangelosi courted controversy during the campaign by denouncing two of his party's policies, writing that his party's position on poker machines “overstuffs the coffers of the Federal Group”, “maintains the monopolised flow of blood money”, and “unbalances unequal scales, committing the poor to financial devastation, the vulnerable to depression and suicide, and working families to fracture and ruin.” He also was embroiled in a controversy over his comments on social media following the murder of George Floyd that appeared to suggest that he supported the police abolition movement.

=== Election in the Legislative Council Division of Elwick ===
On 26 March 2024, it was announced that Cangelosi had sought Labor Party endorsement for the election due in the Tasmanian Legislative Council division of Elwick, insisting that he be endorsed without any reciprocal requirement to vote with the other Labor MPs.

On 28 March 2024, it was announced that Cangelosi had resigned from the Labor Party in order to contest the division as an independent, citing the Labor Party’s apparent refusal to attempt to govern in minority at the 2024 Tasmanian state election held on 23 March 2024, and its failure to endorse any person to contest the division for an election due on 4 May 2024.
