= Cangelosi =

Cangelosi is a surname. Notable people with the surname include:

- Fabiano Cangelosi (born 1987), Australian barrister
- John Cangelosi (born 1963), American baseball player
- Juan Cangelosi (born 1981), Argentine basketball player
- Pietro Cangelosi (born 1942), Italian politician
- Vincenzo Cangelosi (born 1963), Italian football coach and former goalkeeper
