= List of Tasmanian Supreme Court cases =

This is a select list of cases decided by the Supreme Court of Tasmania.

- Attorney General's Reference No. 1 of 1996, Re Weiderman [1998] TASSC 12, (1998) 7 Tas R 293, Court of Appeal: advisory opinion on the use of intoxication as a defence to criminal matters.
- R v Vallance [1960] TASStRp 12, (1960) Tas SR 51, Court of Appeal: voluntariness and intent in regards to crimes. Special leave to appeal was refused: Vallance v R [1961] HCA 42, (1961) 108 CLR 56.
- R v Bryant - 1996, Supreme Court - the sentencing of Martin Bryant

== See also ==
- Lists of case law
- Private timber reserve (Tasmania)
