= Lists of case law =

Lists of case law cover instances of case law, legal decisions in which the law was analyzed to resolve ambiguities for deciding current cases. They are organized alphabetically, by topic or by country.

== Alphabetical lists ==
These lists are pan-jurisdictional.

- R v Lawrence
- R v Smith

== By topic ==
- List of cases involving Lord Denning
- List of class-action lawsuits
- List of copyright case law
- List of environmental lawsuits
- List of gender equality lawsuits
- List of patent case law
- List of trademark case law

== By country ==
=== Australia ===
- List of Federal Court of Australia cases
- List of High Court of Australia cases
- List of Tasmanian Supreme Court cases
- List of Victorian Supreme Court cases

=== Bosnia and Herzegovina ===
- List of decisions of the Constitutional Court of Bosnia and Herzegovina

=== Canada ===
- List of Supreme Court of Canada cases

=== Commonwealth ===
- List of Judicial Committee of the Privy Council cases

=== International ===
- List of International Court of Justice cases

=== United Kingdom ===
- List of early landmark court cases
- List of landmark United Kingdom House of Lords cases
- List of United Kingdom House of Lords cases (post 1997)
- List of Scottish legal cases
- List of Supreme Court of Judicature cases

=== United States ===
- Lists of United States Supreme Court cases
- List of United States state supreme court cases
- List of United States courts of appeals cases
- United States case law topical index

== See also ==
- Lists of landmark court decisions
