= Michael Daly (judge) =

Australian judge

The Honourable Justice Michael Daly

Associate Judge of the Supreme Court of Tasmania
- Incumbent
- Assumed office 29 April 2024
- Preceded by: Stephen Holt

Personal details
- Born: Michael Daly
- Education: University of Tasmania
- Profession: Lawyer

Michael Daly is an Australian judge, who was appointed as an Associate Judge of the Supreme Court of Tasmania on 29 April 2024.

== Early life and education ==
Michael Daly graduated with a Bachelor of Laws from the University of Tasmania in 1992.

== Career ==
Daly began his legal career as a solicitor with Rae and Partners, where he worked from 1993 to 2000. During this period, he was actively involved in the Law Society of Tasmania and the Tasmanian Independent Bar.

In 2000, Daly transitioned to the Tasmanian Independent Bar, practicing in both criminal and civil jurisdictions. His judicial career commenced in 2007 when he was appointed as a temporary magistrate in the Magistrates Court of Tasmania, followed by a permanent appointment in 2008. In 2011, he ascended to the position of Deputy Chief Magistrate, a role he held until his appointment as Associate Judge.

== Appointment as associate judge ==
On 29 April 2024, Daly was sworn in as Associate Judge of the Supreme Court of Tasmania, succeeding Mr. Stephen Holt, who resigned in September 2023 after 24 years in the role. His appointment was celebrated during a ceremonial sitting of the Supreme Court in Hobart, attended by prominent figures including the governor of Tasmania and the Attorney-General and Minister for Justice, Guy Barnett.

== Contributions ==
Daly is noted for his leadership within the legal community and his pivotal role in developing the Youth Justice Division of the Magistrates Court. His efforts focused on enhancing specialist expertise, improving coordination of services, and fostering collaboration between government and non-government agencies.

Following an amendment to section 372 of the Criminal Code 1924, which took effect on 7 November 2023, Daly became the first Associate Judge of the Supreme Court to exercise jurisdiction over both criminal and civil matters, significantly contributing to the efficiency and case management of the Supreme Court.
