= David Porter =

David or Dave Porter may refer to:

== Politicians ==
- David Porter (British politician) (born 1948), Conservative member of parliament for Waveney, 1987–1997
- David Porter (Illinois politician), 19th century Illinois state representative
- David Porter (Ontario politician) (1849–1893), Ontario businessman and political figure
- David Porter (Nunavut politician), member of the Legislative Assembly of Nunavut
- David J. Porter (politician) (born 1956), Republican member of the Texas Railroad Commission
- David R. Porter (1788–1867), Pennsylvania politician
- Dave Porter (Norfolk Islander politician) (born 1954), leader of the Norfolk Liberals
- Dave Porter (Canadian politician), Canadian politician

== Military ==
- David Porter (naval officer) (1780–1843), United States Navy officer and ambassador
- David Dixon Porter (1813–1891), his son, American Civil War Navy officer
- David Dixon Porter (Medal of Honor) (1877–1944), officer in the Philippine–American War

== Sports ==
- David Porter (figure skater) (born 1949), Canadian ice dancing champion
- David Porter (sport shooter) (born 1953), Australian sport shooter
- Dave Porter (sportsman) (1946–2012), NCAA wrestler and football player

== Music ==
- David Porter (musician) (born 1941), American musician
- Dave Porter (composer), American composer

== Others ==
- David Porter (Australian judge), justice of the Supreme Court of Tasmania
- David Porter (bishop) (1906–1993), bishop of Aston in the Church of England
- David H. Porter (1935–2016), professor and past president of Skidmore College
- David J. Porter (judge) (born 1966), United States circuit judge
- David Richard Porter (1882–1973), figure in YMCA
- David Stewart Porter (1909–1989), U.S. federal judge
- Dave Porter (Home and Away), fictional character in TV series Home and Away

== See also ==
- David Porter Heap (1843–1910), American engineer
- David Porter McCorkle, Confederate Lieutenant in the American Civil War
