= Robert Pearce (judge) =

Australian judge

The Honourable Justice Robert William Pearce

Personal details
- Born: Robert William Pearce
- Education: University of Tasmania
- Profession: Lawyer

Robert William Pearce is an Australian judge, who was appointed as a judge of the Supreme Court of Tasmania in June 2013, and is the only member of the Court based in Launceston, Tasmania.

== Background ==
Pearce graduated Bachelor of Laws from the University of Tasmania in 1981.

== Judicial career ==
In 2009, Pearce was appointed a Magistrate, of the Magistrates Court of Tasmania.

After his appointment as a judge of the Supreme Court of Tasmania, in 2014, Pearce later presided over the trial of Marco Daniel Rusterholz for the 2012 murders of Angela Hallam and Joshua Newman. Pearce later convicted Rusterholz and sentenced him to 45 years’ imprisonment.
