= 2024–25 AC Perugia Calcio season =

Football club season

AC Perugia Calcio
2024–25 season
- Chairman: Javier Faroni
- Head coach: Alessandro Formisano (1st–11th); Lamberto Zauli (12th–27th); Vincenzo Cangelosi (28th–38th)
- Stadium: Stadio Renato Curi
- Serie C: 12th
- Coppa Italia Serie C: Round of 16
- Top goalscorer: League: Daniele Montevago (13); All: Daniele Montevago (13)
- Highest home attendance: 8,721
- Lowest home attendance: 726
- Average home league attendance: 4,215
- Biggest win: Perugia 4–0 Lucchese (6 October 2024)
- Biggest defeat: Perugia 1–4 Rimini (26 September 2024)
colours	colours

The 2024–25 season is the 121st in the history of Perugia and competes in Serie C, the third tier of Italian football.

== Squad ==
Note: Flags indicate national team as defined under FIFA eligibility rules; some limited exceptions apply. Players may hold more than one non-FIFA nationality.

No.	Pos.	Nation	Player
1	GK	ITA	Luca Gemello
21	GK	ITA	Marco Albertoni
3	DF	ITA	Raul Morichelli
5	DF	ITA	Gabriele Angella (captain)
13	DF	SWE	Peter Amoran
15	DF	ITA	Cristian Dell'Orco
44	DF	NED	Noah Lewis
67	DF	ITA	Matteo Plaia
91	DF	FRA	Mouhamed Souare
98	DF	ITA	Federico Giraudo
6	MF	ITA	Giovanni Giunti
16	MF	ITA	Paolo Bartolomei
18	MF	ITA	Luca Di Maggio

No.	Pos.	Nation	Player
19	MF	ISL	Adam Pálsson
20	MF	ITA	Federico Ricci
23	MF	ITA	Francesco Lisi
29	MF	ITA	Jérémie Broh
84	MF	LTU	Adrian Lickūnas
7	FW	ITA	Luca Bacchin
9	FW	ITA	Daniele Montevago
10	FW	BRA	Ryder Matos
11	FW	ITA	Alessandro Seghetti
17	FW	ITA	Andrea Cisco
30	FW	ITA	Giacomo Marconi
45	FW	SEN	Youssouph Cheikh Sylla

== Competitions ==
=== Overall record ===
Competition	First match	Last match	Starting round	Final position	Record							
Competition	First match	Last match	Starting round	Final position	Pld	W	D	L	GF	GA	GD	Win %
Serie C	1	38	Matchday 1	12th	38	10	12	16	40	45	−5	26.32
Coppa Italia Serie C	First round	Round of 16	First round	Round of 16	2	1	0	1	3	3	+0	50.00
Total					40	11	12	17	43	48	−5	27.50

Source: Competitions

=== Serie C ===
Group B

==== Results summary ====
Overall								Home						Away					
Pld	W	D	L	GF	GA	GD	Pts	W	D	L	GF	GA	GD	W	D	L	GF	GA	GD
38	10	12	16	40	45	−5	42	8	6	5	25	17	+8	2	6	11	15	28	−13

==== Results by round ====
Round	1	2	3	4	5	6	7	8	9	10	11	12	13	14	15	16	17	18	19	20	21	22	23	24	25	26	27	28	29	30	31	32	33	34	35	36	37	38
Ground	A	H	A	H	A	H	A	H	H	A	H	A	A	H	A	H	A	H	A	H	A	H	A	H	A	H	A	H	A	H	A	H	A	H	A	H	A	H
Result	W	D	L	D	D	L	D	W	L	W	L	L	D	D	L	W	D	W	L	W	D	L	D	L	W	D	L	W	D	W	L	D	L	W	D	L	W	D
Position																																						

A = Away; H = Home; W = Win; D = Draw; L = Loss

==== Matches ====
M	Date	Opponent	Venue	Score	Att.	Perugia Scorers
1	24 Aug 2024	Pianese	Away	3–3	1,467	Ricci, Polizzi, Montevago
2	30 Aug 2024	SPAL	Home	3–0	3,867	Torrasi, Montevago (2)
3	8 Sep 2024	Carpi	Away	0–2	1,007	
4	15 Sep 2024	Gubbio	Home	1–1	6,675	Mezzoni
5	23 Sep 2024	Pescara	Away	0–0	6,297	
6	26 Sep 2024	Rimini	Home	1–4	3,983	Cisco
7	30 Sep 2024	Vis Pesaro	Away	0–0	1,825	
8	6 Oct 2024	Lucchese	Home	4–0	4,290	Lisi (pen.), Ricci, Di Maggio, Mezzoni
9	12 Oct 2024	Virtus Entella	Home	0–1	4,476	
10	19 Oct 2024	Ascoli	Away	1–0	4,291	Montevago
11	27 Oct 2024	Milan Futuro	Home	0–2	5,085	
12	30 Oct 2024	Torres	Away	1–2	3,295	Lisi
13	3 Nov 2024	Legnago	Away	2–2	789	Montevago, Sylla
14	10 Nov 2024	Ternana	Home	0–0	8,721	
15	16 Nov 2024	Pineto	Away	1–3	800	Seghetti
16	22 Nov 2024	Arezzo	Home	2–0	4,242	Di Maggio, Montevago
17	1 Dec 2024	Sestri Levante	Away	2–2	726	Montevago, Torrasi
18	9 Dec 2024	Campobasso	Home	2–1	3,424	Seghetti (2)
19	15 Dec 2024	Pontedera	Away	1–2	769	Montevago
20	22 Dec 2024	Pianese	Home	1–0	3,210	Montevago
21	5 Jan 2025	SPAL	Away	1–1	5,420	Montevago
22	12 Jan 2025	Carpi	Home	0–1	3,350	
23	19 Jan 2025	Gubbio	Away	0–0	2,100	
24	26 Jan 2025	Pescara	Home	1–3	4,120	Seghetti
25	2 Feb 2025	Rimini	Away	1–0	3,150	Montevago
26	9 Feb 2025	Vis Pesaro	Home	0–0	3,280	
27	16 Feb 2025	Lucchese	Away	1–2	2,450	Sylla
28	23 Feb 2025	Virtus Entella	Away	1–0	1,850	Montevago
29	2 Mar 2025	Ascoli	Home	1–1	4,050	Marconi
30	9 Mar 2025	Milan Futuro	Away	1–0	950	Amoran
31	12 Mar 2025	Torres	Home	0–1	3,180	
32	16 Mar 2025	Legnago	Home	1–1	3,050	Montevago
33	23 Mar 2025	Ternana	Away	0–2	10,250	
34	30 Mar 2025	Pineto	Home	3–1	3,340	Seghetti, Montevago, Di Maggio
35	6 Apr 2025	Arezzo	Away	1–1	4,100	Sylla
36	13 Apr 2025	Sestri Levante	Home	1–2	3,210	Lisi
37	19 Apr 2025	Campobasso	Away	2–1	4,500	Sylla, Bartolomei
38	27 Apr 2025	Pontedera	Home	1–1	3,450	Seghetti

=== Coppa Italia Serie C ===
Round	Date	Opponent	Score	Att.	Perugia Scorers
First round	18 Aug 2024	Latina	2–1	1,320	Montevago, Angella
Round of 16	26 Nov 2024	Arezzo	1–2	950	Marconi
