= John Morris (judge) =

Australian judge and university chancellor

The Honourable Sir John Morris KCMG

8th Chief Justice of Tasmania
- In office 15 April 1940 – 3 July 1956
- Preceded by: Sir Harold Crisp
- Succeeded by: Stanley Burbury

Personal details
- Born: 24 December 1902 Hawthorn, Victoria, Australia
- Died: 3 July 1956 (aged 53) Hobart, Tasmania, Australia
- Spouse: Mary Louisa McDermott
- Education: University of Melbourne
- Profession: Judge, barrister

Sir John Demetrius Morris KCMG (24 December 1902 – 3 July 1956) was an Australian jurist, who was Chief Justice of Tasmania from 1940 until his death in office in 1956.

== Early life and education ==
Morris was born on 24 December 1902 in Hawthorn, Victoria. He was the son of Margaret Jane (née Smith) and James Demetrius Morris; his father was a public servant from New Zealand. His paternal grandfather Christoforos Moros was born on the Greek island of Poros and emigrated to Australia during the Victorian gold rush; he subsequently anglicised his name to Christopher Morris and became a successful businessman.

Morris was educated at St Patrick's College, East Melbourne, and then studied arts and law at the University of Melbourne.

== Legal career ==
On 7 November 1927, Morris was admitted to the Victorian Bar. In October 1930, he and his new wife, Mary McDermott, moved to Hobart, where Morris was admitted to the Tasmanian Bar. He joined the law firm of Albert Ogilvie, later becoming a partner in the firm with Ogilvie and Nick McKenna, which was renamed Ogilvie, McKenna & Morris in 1931. Morris eventually handled most of the firm's case work when Ogilvie and McKenna shifted their focus to political aspirations, and he left the partnership in 1938 to establish his own legal practice.

In July 1939, the Premier of Tasmania, Edmund Dwyer-Gray appointed Morris to the Supreme Court of Tasmania as acting Chief Justice while Sir Harold Crisp was on long service leave pending his retirement. With Crisp's term concluded in April 1940, Morris was sworn in as Chief Justice on 15 April. He was made Knight Bachelor on 1 January 1943, and upgraded to Knight Commander of the Order of St Michael and St George (KCMG) in 1952. As Chief Justice, Morris oversaw the 1947 case of corruption charges against the Premier, Robert Cosgrove, in which Cosgrove was acquitted of all charges and resumed the premiership in February 1948.

== Academic role ==
On 25 February 1944, Morris was appointed as Chancellor of the University of Tasmania. As Chancellor, he was considered to have improved conditions at the economically disadvantaged institution. In 1952, he appointed Sydney Sparkes Orr as chair of philosophy. In 1954, the university's staff association called for Morris to resign, after he was accused of dominating the council after he overrode the professorial board's refusal to admit a student who had not matriculated with a mathematics subject—the student was Christopher Koch, who later became a well-known author. A royal commission was held in 1955, which recognised Morris' contribution to the university, but criticised him. The strain of these conflicts and criticism exacerbated Morris' already poor health due to over-exertion, and he died from a coronary occlusion at his desk in the Supreme Court chambers on 3 July 1956, aged 53.

Legal offices
Preceded by Sir Harold Crisp	Chief Justice of Tasmania; 1940–1956	Succeeded by Stanley Burbury
Academic offices
Preceded by William Stops	Chancellor of the University of Tasmania; 1944–1956	Succeeded by Henry Baker
