= Valentine Fleming (judge) =

Australian politician

Sir Valentine Fleming KC (13 November 1809 – 25 October 1884) was an English Australian judge, Solicitor-General, Attorney-General and public servant, who was Chief Justice of Van Diemen's Land (now Tasmania)

== Biography ==
Fleming was born in Ashby-de-la-Zouch, Leicestershire, England, the second son of Captain Valentine Fleming of Tuam, County Galway and his wife Catherine, a daughter of John Hunter Gowan II. Fleming was educated at Bangor and Trinity College, Dublin, graduating with honours in 1834. He was called to the bar at Gray's Inn on 21 January 1838.

In 1841 Fleming was appointed commissioner of insolvent debtors, Hobart Town, Van Diemen's Land. He became Solicitor-General in 1844, Attorney-General in 1848, an official member of the Legislative Council in 1851 and Chief Justice of the Supreme Court of Van Diemen's Land in 1854. He was knighted in 1856 and retired on a pension of £1000 a year at the end of 1869, but was acting Chief Justice in the absence from Tasmania of his successor from 1872 to 1874. From March to May 1874 Fleming administered the Tasmanian government.

He built a home in Hobart in 1846 that was subsequently occupied by Sir William Lambert Dobson, Chief Justice 1885-1898.

He died near Reigate, England on 25 October 1884. He married twice: once to Elizabeth Oke, daughter of Charles Buckland, and second to Fanny Maria, daughter of William Seccombe, who survived him.

Legal offices
Preceded by Sir John Pedder	Chief Justice of Van Diemen's Land; 1854-1869	Succeeded by Sir Francis Smith
