= Harold Crisp =

Australian judge

Sir Harold Crisp

7th Chief Justice of Tasmania
- In office 21 December 1937 – 14 April 1940
- Preceded by: Sir Herbert Nicholls
- Succeeded by: John Morris

Personal details
- Born: 27 July 1874 Hobart, Tasmania, Australia
- Died: 12 May 1942 (aged 67) Double Bay, New South Wales, Australia
- Spouse: Harriette Page
- Profession: Judge, barrister

Sir Harold Crisp (27 July 1874 – 12 May 1942) was an Australian judge of the Supreme Court of Tasmania from 1914 and Chief Justice of Tasmania from 1937 until his retirement in 1940.

Crisp was born in Hobart, Tasmania in 1874. His father, David Crisp, was a well-known lawyer in Hobart, and Harold served articles with his father before his admission as a practitioner of the Supreme Court on 16 April 1896. Upon his admission to the bar, he joined his father's firm. He moved to the town of Zeehan on Tasmania's west coast where he practised for several years before returning to Hobart to join his father as a partner in the firm Crisp & Crisp.

In 1914, on his 40th birthday, Crisp accepted an appointment as a puisne judge of the Supreme Court and took his seat on the bench on 2 August. When Chief Justice Sir Herbert Nicholls retired on 31 October 1937, Crisp served as acting Chief Justice until he was officially appointed on 21 December. On 9 June 1938, Crisp was made Knight Bachelor. In May 1939, Crisp announced his retirement due to ill health, applying to take nine months of long service leave from July before the completion of his term in April 1940. After a farewell function on 14 July 1939, Crisp left for Sydney. He died at his home in the Sydney suburb of Double Bay on 12 May 1942.

Legal offices
Preceded by Sir Herbert Nicholls	Chief Justice of Tasmania; 1937–1940	Succeeded by John Morris
