= Helen Wood (judge) =

Female judge in Tasmania, Australia

The Honourable Justice Helen Wood

Judge of the Supreme Court of Tasmania
- Incumbent
- Assumed office 9 November 2009

Magistrates Court of Tasmania
- In office 1994–2009

Personal details
- Born: Helen Lambert Hobart, Tasmania
- Education: University of Tasmania BA/LLB (1985)
- Occupation: Judge, lawyer

Helen Wood is a puisne judge of the Supreme Court of Tasmania who was appointed in November 2009. Wood is the senior puisne judge of the Supreme Court and is only the second female judge appointed to the Court, the first being Shan Tennent. Prior to her appointment to the Supreme Court, Wood had been a magistrate of the Magistrates Court of Tasmania. Appointed to the Magistrates Court in 1994, Wood was Tasmania's first female magistrate.
