= Caroline Wells =

Australian governor of Tasmania

Her Excellency the Honourable Caroline Wells AC

30th Governor of Tasmania
- Incumbent
- Assumed office 17 June 2026
- Monarch: Charles III
- Premier: Jeremy Rockliff
- Lieutenant Governor: Chris Shanahan
- Preceded by: Barbara Baker

Personal details
- Education: The Friends School
- Alma mater: University of Tasmania (BN); Deakin University (MBA)
- Profession: Registered nurse

Caroline Wells is the governor of Tasmania, succeeding Barbara Baker on 17 June 2026. She was announced as the governor-designate by premier Jeremy Rockliff in May 2026. She is Tasmania's third consecutive female governor.

Wells is a graduate of the University of Tasmania and Deakin University as well as a member of the Australian Institute of Company Directors. She was chairwoman of the Royal Flying Doctor Service Tasmania, and was a member on the premier's Health and Wellbeing Advisory Council. Her partner is Dr Rob Walters, RFD, a general practitioner and leading advocate for men’s health. Walters was travelling doctor for Prime Minister Julia Gillard when she undertook official overseas travel.

In 2026, Wells was appointed as a Companion of the Order of Australia (AC) for "eminent service to the community through health governance roles, to aged care, to nursing and as the 30th Governor appointed in Tasmania"

Government offices
Preceded by Barbara Baker	Governor of Tasmania; 2026–present	Incumbent
