= Barbara Baker =

Governor of Tasmania 2021-2026

The Honourable Barbara Baker AC
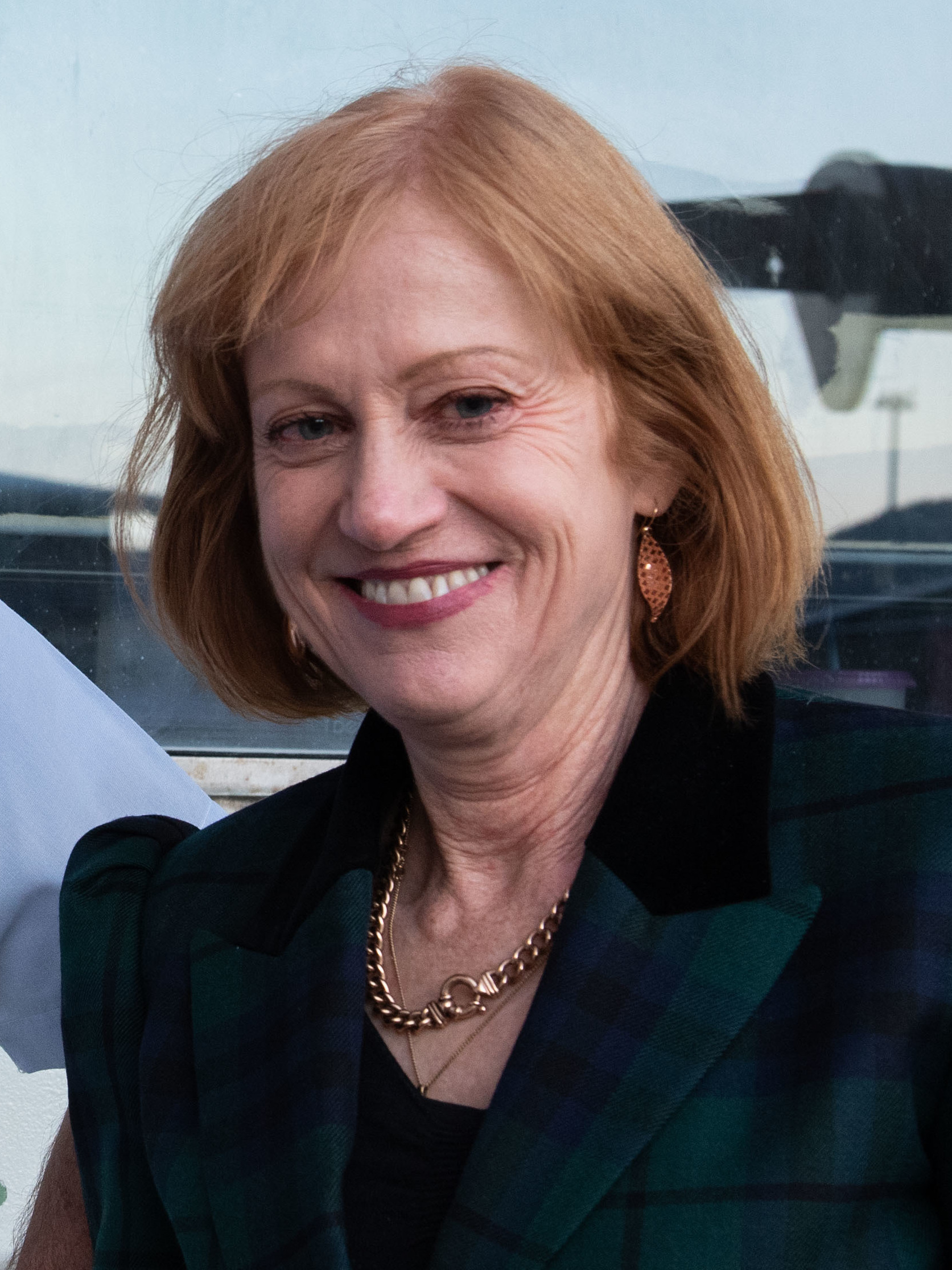
- Baker in 2022

29th Governor of Tasmania
- In office 16 June 2021 – 15 June 2026
- Monarchs: Elizabeth II; Charles III
- Premier: Peter Gutwein; Jeremy Rockliff
- Lieutenant Governor: Alan Blow (2021–24); Christopher Shanahan (2025–present)
- Preceded by: Kate Warner
- Succeeded by: Caroline Wells

Judge of the Federal Circuit Court
- In office 27 October 2008 – 31 January 2021

Personal details
- Born: Barbara Avalon Baker; 31 March 1958 (age 68) Hobart, Tasmania
- Spouse: Don Chalmers
- Parents: Bob Baker (father); Alison Burton (mother)
- Education: University of Tasmania
- Profession: Lawyer; Judge

Barbara Avalon Baker (born 31 March 1958) is an Australian barrister and former judge, who was the 29th governor of Tasmania from June 2021 to June 2026. She served on the Federal Circuit Court of Australia from 2008 to 2021. Baker was succeeded as governor by Caroline Wells on 17 June 2026.

== Early life ==
Baker was born on 31 March 1958 in Hobart, Tasmania, and raised in Sandy Bay. Her parents were Alison Burton, a tennis player, and Bob Baker, a lawyer who became a Liberal member of the Tasmanian Parliament. Baker studied arts and law at the University of Tasmania, graduating in 1980 (BA, LLB). She represented Tasmania in tennis and field hockey at under-18 level.

== Career ==
Baker was admitted to the legal profession in 1983. She joined Simmons Wolfhagen as a solicitor and later worked for the Office of the Solicitor-General. In 1993 she became the first female partner at Murdoch Clarke. As a lawyer Baker "specialised in family law and relationship matters". She served on the executive of the Law Society of Tasmania (1995–1996) and as president of the Family Law Practitioners' Association (2002).

In 2008, Baker was appointed to the Federal Magistrates Court of Australia, the first Tasmanian woman to serve on the court. In 2013 the court was renamed the Federal Circuit Court and its members received the title "judge" rather than magistrate. She retired from the judiciary in January 2021 and returned to practise as a barrister at Burbury Chambers.

== Governor of Tasmania ==
In May 2021, Premier Peter Gutwein announced that Baker would succeed Kate Warner as governor of Tasmania with effect from 16 June. She stated that she would "focus on gender equality and family violence issues in the community", as well as encouraging participation in sport and acting as a role model for young lawyers. She also said that her personal views on the monarchy or republicanism were not relevant to the position.

In the 2021 Queen's Birthday Honours she was appointed a Companion of the Order of Australia.

== Personal life ==
Baker is married to Don Chalmers AO, an emeritus professor of law at the University of Tasmania, and has two daughters.

Baker captained Tasmania in indoor hockey. She was also an accomplished real tennis player, winning the singles and doubles events of the 1998 Australian Open.

Government offices
Preceded by Kate Warner	Governor of Tasmania; 2021–2026	Succeeded by Caroline Wells
