= Pierre Slicer =

Australian judge

Pierre Slicer AO

Judge of the Supreme Court of Tasmania
- In office 3 June 1991 – 18 September 2009
- Preceded by: Frank Neasey
- Succeeded by: Helen Wood

Personal details
- Born: 2 December 1943 (age 82) Sydney, Australia
- Party: Labor (to 1969); Communist (1969–?)
- Education: University of Tasmania

Pierre Slicer AO (born 2 December 1943) is an Australian judge and former political activist. He was a judge of the Supreme Court of Tasmania from 1991 to 2009 and a judge of the Supreme Court of Samoa from 2010 to 2014. He was previously state secretary of the Communist Party of Australia from 1974 to 1979.

== Early life ==
Slicer was born in Sydney on 2 December 1943. His father was an American serviceman who fought in the Philippines during World War II, while his mother was an Australian woman from Dover, Tasmania.

Slicer moved to Tasmania at a young age with his mother, attending St Mary's College and St Virgil's College in Hobart. He subsequently studied law at the University of Tasmania and was president of the Tasmanian University Student Association in 1965.

== Politics and activism ==
Slicer joined the Australian Labor Party (ALP) as a young man, but resigned his membership in 1969 and instead joined the Communist Party of Australia (CPA). In 1974 he was elected state secretary of the Communist Party in place of Max Bound. He also served on the party's national committee and in 1976 toured Italy, Romania and Yugoslavia with a CPA delegation. He resigned as state secretary in 1979, attributed to health reasons, and later left the party after losing his enthusiasm for the movement.

During the late 1960s and early 1970s, Slicer was a leader of the Vietnam Moratorium movement in Devonport. He was a founding member and legal adviser to the Tasmanian Aboriginal Legal Service, also serving as counsel to the Tasmanian Wilderness Society and the Salamanca Campaign for gay rights. During the Franklin Dam controversy he was jailed for three weeks for his involvement in anti-dam protests.

== Legal career ==
=== Tasmania ===
Slicer was admitted to practise law in Tasmania in 1966. He was a member of the Tasmanian Law Reform Commission from 1974 to 1977. As one of the few criminal barristers in north-west Tasmania he was involved in a diverse range of cases and appeared in his first murder trial in his late twenties. He notably represented CSIRO scientist Rory Jack Thompson in the trial for the murder and dismemberment of his wife in 1984.

In 1991, Slicer was appointed as a justice of the Supreme Court of Tasmania. He retired in 2009 as the senior puisne judge of the court, but in 2017 was reappointed as an acting judge to help clear a backlog of cases.

=== Samoa ===
Slicer spent three weeks in Samoa in 2006, as an independent judge on cases relating to the 2006 Samoan general election. After retiring from the Supreme Court of Tasmania, he served on the Supreme Court of Samoa from 2010 to 2014, including as a judge of the Court of Appeal. He was given the honorary chiefly rank of matai and adopted the Samoan-language name of Lautalatoa.
