= David Porter (Australian judge) =

Australian judge and legal academic

David James Porter AM KC is an adjunct professor in the School of Law, University of Tasmania, and a former judge of the Supreme Court of Tasmania having served as a judge of that Court from 2008 to 2016, then as an acting judge from 2017 to 2025 in both full time and part time capacities at various times. During his time as a judge, Porter served as the Administrator of the State for short periods during the Governor’s absence.

== Education and legal career ==
Porter graduated from UTAS in 1975 and was admitted to practice in Tasmania in 1978. His early years in practice were spent employed in private practice in a Launceston, becoming a partner in a firm in 1983. He was made managing partner of that firm in 1989. Porter was made Queens Counsel in 1995 after going to the Independent Bar in 1992. He appeared in all courts in Tasmania including the Federal and Family Courts, in the Supreme Court and Court of Appeal of Victoria, the Supreme Court of NSW and in the High Court. At the time of his appointment he was practising as a barrister from chambers in Hobart, and was the editor of the Tasmanian Reports (from 1994) and the chair of the Tasmanian Medical Complaints Tribunal (from 2000).

Both as a solicitor advocate and a barrister, Porter was involved in many high profile and contentious cases. Of particlar note among these is his appearance for a person of primary interest in the 1991 Royal Commission into the Attempted Bribery of an MP. Porter also appeared for the family of the deceased at a lengthy inquest and subsequent Supreme Court proceedings, in relation to a highly publicised police shooting. In the years leading up to his appointment as a judge, Porter had extended his practice to Victoria. One matter in which he was briefed was a test case brought against a State orphanage and the State of Victoria. The case involved historic allegations of sexual and physical abuse, and Porter appeared for the orphanage. The claims were ultimately settled at mediation in which he was involved.

Porter was very active in various professional bodies. He was President of the Tasmanian Bar Association from 1987 to 1989 (later the Litigation Committee of the Law Society) and President of the Law Society of Tasmania in 1992. In 1995 he was invited by the then President of the Australian Bar Association to represent the Tasmanian Independent Bar (now the Tasmanian Bar Association Inc) on the ABA. He did so from 1995 to 2002. He was President of the Australian Bar Association in 2000, the first Tasmanian to hold that position, and served as Treasurer until 2002. He also has a long history of involvement with legal education. In particular, he was the Director of the Tasmanian Legal Practice Course from 1996 to 1999, having been acting director in 1994 and deputy director in 1994 and 1995. He was a member of the Board of Legal Education from 1993 to 1996, being Chair of that Board from 2008 to 2021, and also a member of the national Legal Admissions Consultative Committee from 2008 to 2021.

== Judicial career ==
Porter was appointed a judge of the Supreme Court of Tasmania in 2008. He served as a judge until May 2016 when he resigned. He was then appointed a part time acting judge of that Court in February 2017. Porter was very active in that role and his appointment was extended several times. In February 2024 he was appointed a full time acting judge of the Court with effect until 30 June 2025. In March 2025, he was again appointed on a part time basis until 31 December 2025.

== Personal life and honours ==
Porter is a qualified advocacy teacher and has been active in that role from 1990 to date. A highlight of that role was his involvement in an Australian Bar Association teaching trip to Bangladesh in 1999. Outside the law, Porter has been president of the Northern Tasmania Football Association and a director of Crimestoppers. He married Anne Dart in July 2003.

In the 2021 Queen's Birthday Honours Porter was appointed a Member of the Order of Australia for "significant service to the law, and to the judiciary, in Tasmania".

== Publications ==
'Legal Practice: A Career in Conflict' (2017) 36 University of Tasmania Law Review 87.

Kate Warner & David Porter, Sentencing in Tasmania (3rd ed, Federation Press, 2026).

== See also ==
- List of Judges of the Supreme Court of Tasmania
