= John Pedder =

Australian politician

Sir John Lewes Pedder (10 February 1784 – 24 March 1859) was an English Australian judge, politician and grazier, he was the first Chief Justice of Van Diemen's Land (now Tasmania).

== Early life ==
Pedder was born in London, the eldest son of John Pedder, a barrister. Pedder junior was educated at Charterhouse and the Middle Temple from 1818 where he was called to the bar in 1820. Then he entered Trinity Hall, Cambridge, graduating LL.B. in 1822.

== Career ==
Pedder was appointed Chief Justice of Van Diemen's Land on 18 August 1823. Pedder sailed in the Hibernia, arriving in Hobart with his wife Maria, a daughter of Lieutenant-Colonel Everett, on 15 March 1824. Also on the ship were Joseph Gellibrand, the first Attorney-General of Van Dieman's land and Saxe Bannister, the first Attorney-General of New South Wales. Trial by jury was a contentious issue in the colonies of New South Wales and Van Diemen's Land and each were immediately involved. John Bigge conducted an inquiry from 1819 to 1821 into the colonies of NSW and Van Diemen's Land. Bigge's 1823 report on judicial establishments recommended against trial by a civilian jury, and the House of Commons had narrowly defeated a proposal that juries be introduced for criminal trials, prior to passing the New South Wales Act 1823 which prescribed military juries for criminal trials before the Supreme Court and that convicts could be tried summarily. Nothing was said of the procedure before courts of quarter sessions. Both Gellibrand and Bannister were of the opinion that courts of quarter sessions could not try free persons without juries. On 24 May 1824 Gellibrand in his inaugural address to the Supreme Court, spoke of trial by jury as being "one of the greatest boons conferred by the legislature upon this colony".

The issue of trial by jury was first argued before the newly established Supreme Court of New South Wales and Chief Justice Forbes held that civilian juries were required for Court of Quarter Sessions. Despite his initial address, Gellibrand subsequently vacillated in his views. In July 1825 the issue came before the Supreme Court of Van Diemen's Land, with the Second Law officer of the Crown, Solicitor-General Alfred Stephen, seeking an order requiring juries to be assembled while Gellibrand as the 1st Law Officer opposed it. Pedder, in a long and weighty judgment took a different view to Forbes, holding that the right to trial by civilian jury was taken away by section 19 of the New South Wales Act 1823.

== Legacy ==
Lake Pedder in south-west Tasmania was named after him.

Legal offices
New title	Chief Justice of Van Dieman's Land; 1824-1854	Succeeded by Sir Valentine Fleming
