= Shan Tennent =

Australian judge

The Honourable Justice Shan Eve Tennent

Judge of the Supreme Court of Tasmania
- In office 15 March 2005 – 3 November 2017

Personal details
- Born: 1952 (age 73–74) Brisbane, Queensland, Australia
- Education: University of Queensland
- Occupation: Judge, lawyer

Shan Eve Tennent (born 1952) is a former Australian judge. She was a Judge of the Supreme Court of Tasmania between March 2005 and October 2017, and was the first woman to be appointed to the Court.

Tennent studied law at the University of Queensland, subsequently moving to Tasmania in 1977. She practised law in Hobart, specialising in family law cases, and worked as a partner at Hobart firm Page Seager for fifteen years. In 1998 she was appointed as both a magistrate and a coroner, leading to her high-profile 2001 inquest into prisoner deaths in custody at Risdon Prison, the state's largest prison. The subsequent report resulted in a number of sackings, and ultimately led to the decision to completely rebuild the prison.

Tennent was appointed to the Supreme Court of Tasmania on 15 March 2005 by Governor William Cox, making her the first woman to sit on the court in its 180-year history. Tennent retired with effect on 3 November 2017. In March 2019 Tennent was inducted into the Tasmanian Honour Roll of Women for "service to justice and human rights".
