= Stephen Estcourt =

Australian judge (born 1953)

The Honourable Justice Stephen Estcourt AM
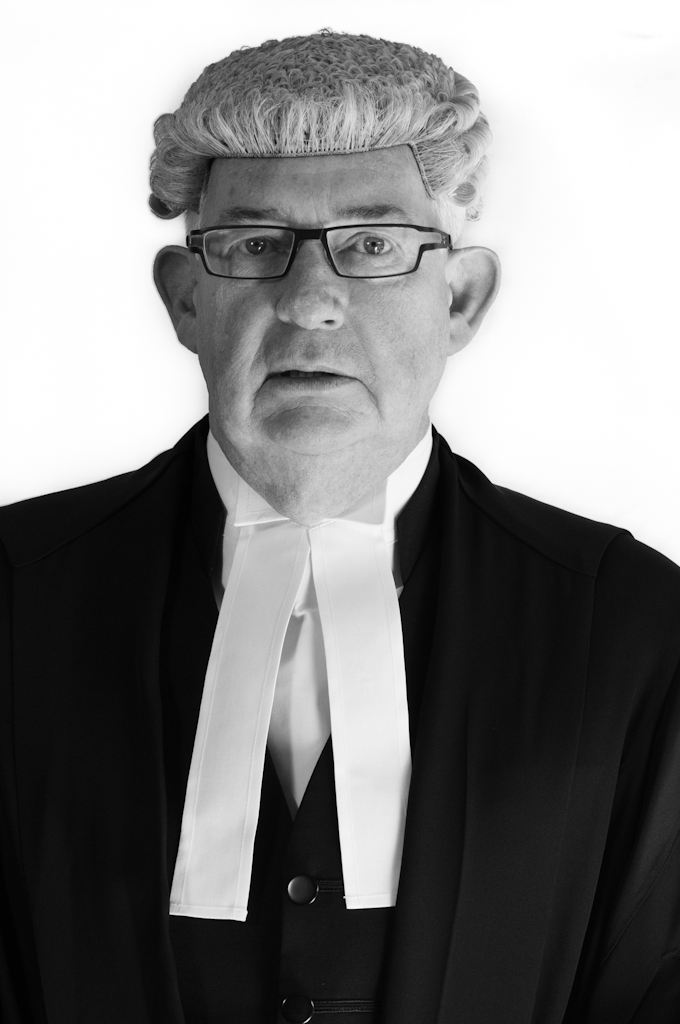
- Born: 20 March 1953 (age 73); Hobart, Tasmania
- Education: University of Tasmania
- Occupation: Lawyer
- Spouse: Mary Estcourt (m. 1976)

Stephen Peter Estcourt AM (born 20 March 1953 in Hobart, Tasmania) is an Australian judge, who has been Puisne Judge of the Supreme Court of Tasmania since April 2013. From 2004 to 2013, he maintained barristers' chambers in Hobart and Melbourne, dividing his time between the two.

== Education ==
Estcourt was educated at New Town High School and Elizabeth Matriculation College and graduated with a Bachelor of Laws degree with Honours from the University of Tasmania in 1974.

== Career ==
After 15 years as a barrister and solicitor with the firm of Archer Bushby in Launceston, Estcourt was appointed as a magistrate in 1990 sitting in Hobart. Estcourt left the Court in 1994 to establish the Resource Management and Planning Appeal Tribunal for the Tasmanian Government. After 2 years as the inaugural chair of that body he resigned to join the Tasmanian Independent Bar in late 1995.

Estcourt "took silk" in 1998 and as Queen's Counsel practiced extensively in the civil and criminal jurisdictions of the Supreme Court of Tasmania and in the Federal and High Courts of Australia. Estcourt was President of the Law Society of Tasmania in 1988 and between 2003 and 2007 was President of the Tasmanian Independent Bar. In 2006 he was elected President of the Australian Bar Association, a position he held until January 2008. Estcourt signed the Victorian Bar Roll in September 2004. By the end of 2011, Estcourt was a Fellow of the Australian Academy of Law.

In 2001 Estcourt was appointed part-time Deputy President of the Commonwealth Administrative Appeals Tribunal and sat all over Australia hearing chiefly visa refusal and deportation cases. He left the AAT in 2004 as a result of philosophical objections to Attorney General Philip Ruddock's apparent oversight and appointment practices.

In September 2011, Estcourt was cited in Australian Parliament by the Prime Minister of Australia in response to a question from the member for Stirling and by the Minister for Immigration and Citizenship in response to a question from the member for McEwen relating to asylum seekers.

In March 2013, the Attorney-General of Tasmania, Brian Wightman, announced Estcourt's appointment as a Puisne Judge of the Supreme Court of Tasmania.

In November 2017, the Governor of Tasmania presided over the swearing in of Estcourt as one of the Administrators of the Government of Tasmania.

In 2022, Estcourt was appointed as a Judge of the Court of Appeal of the Kingdom of Tonga.

== Cases ==
He had a pro bono ethic, and was involved in a number of significant public interest cases in Hobart, Melbourne and in Brisbane, among them Commonwealth of Australia v Wood, Sok v Minister for Immigration, Minister for Immigration v X, and QAAA v Minister for Immigration.

These also included a rarely permitted intervention in the High Court of Australia on behalf of the UNHCR as amicus curiae in Minister for Immigration v QAAH. In 2009 he was engaged pro bono from Melbourne as senior counsel in litigation against the Tasmanian Government over conditions in the Behavioural Management Unit in Tasmania's Risdon Prison.

Estcourt was President of the ABA during the infamous arrest and detention of Gold Coast doctor Mohammed Haneef and famously said when informed by The Sydney Morning Herald of Immigration Minister Andrew's cancellation of Haneef's visa after a Brisbane magistrate had granted him bail "He can't do that", an opinion ultimately shared by the full Federal Court of Australia.

Among his more notable cases Estcourt acted for the Tasmanian Deputy Premier Bryan Green in his criminal trial on charges under the Criminal Code arising from the granting of a monopoly to the Tasmanian building industry regulator. Estcourt's involvement in that trial led to an allegation that he had entered into an illegal bargain with the Tasmanian Government to be appointed the Solicitor General for Tasmania in exchange for acting for Green without fee. That rumour was judicially debunked by Justice Evans in State of Tasmania v Johnston, but prior to that the Hobart Mercury newspaper falsely reported that Estcourt had declined to be interviewed about the matter by Tasmania Police. He sued the Mercury and its reporter Sue Neales for defamation and the settlement in Estcourt's favour involved what was at the time the largest judgement for damages for defamation in Tasmanian legal history, as well as fulsome official and personal apologies from the editor.

In 2022, Estcourt was one of the four judges who heard the appeals relating to the 2021 Tongan general election.

== Personal life ==
Estcourt married Mary McDevitt in 1976. In 2010, he co-organised a multicultural festival, World Party Tas. The event was repeated in 2012 and the Tasmanian Premier, Ms Lara Giddings, congratulated him on his involvement. In 2011, Estcourt was a Tasmanian State Finalist for the Australian of the Year awards.

In the Australian Queen's Birthday Honours in 2018, it was announced that Estcourt had been made a member of the Order of Australia for "significant service to the judiciary as a Judge of the Supreme Court of Tasmania, to legal education, and to professional law societies".
