= Chris Shanahan =

Tasmanian judge (born 1960)

The Honourable Chris Shanahan SC

15th Chief Justice of Tasmania
- Incumbent
- Assumed office 20 January 2025
- Nominated by: Jeremy Rockliff
- Governor: Barbara Baker; Himself (acting); Caroline Wells
- Preceded by: Alan Blow

Lieutenant-Governor of Tasmania
- Incumbent
- Assumed office 20 January 2025
- Premier: Jeremy Rockliff
- Governor: Barbara Baker; Himself (acting); Caroline Wells
- Preceded by: Alan Blow

Governor of Tasmania
- Acting
- In office 15 June 2026 – 17 June 2026
- Premier: Jeremy Rockliff
- Preceded by: Barbara Baker
- Succeeded by: Caroline Wells

Personal details
- Born: 26 September 1960 (age 65) Sydney, New South Wales
- Education: Aquinas College, Perth, University of Western Australia, University of Sydney & University of New South Wales

Christopher Patrick Shanahan (born 18 September 1960) is the Chief Justice of the Supreme Court of Tasmania, an office he assumed on 20 January 2025, his appointment as chief justice and as lieutenant-Governor of Tasmania having been announced on 2 December 2024. Before his appointment, his Honour was a Senior Counsel in the State of Western Australia, who accepted briefs primarily in the areas of superior court appeals, equity and administrative law.

== Early life and education ==
He was educated at Aquinas College, Perth, University of Western Australia, University of Sydney and the University of New South Wales. He completed his articles with Jackson MacDonald in 1983. He was admitted to practice in Western Australia in 1984, New South Wales in 1989 and the High Court of Australia in 1990.

== Career ==
From 1990-91 he was a Senior Officer to the Department of Prime Minister and Cabinet. During 1993, he joined the Western Australian Bar Association and continued to work as a barrister. He was responsible for the development of the Bar Readers' Course, which was presented in 2004 by the Western Australian Bar Association.

During his career at the Bar, his Honour taught at Macquarie University in Sydney, lectured at Murdoch University in Perth and in Ethics and Professional Responsibility with the Law Society of Western Australia.

In 2004, he was appointed Senior Counsel in the State of Western Australia. During 2005, he was appointed acting commissioner of the Corruption and Crime Commission in Western Australia.

On 2 December 2024, it was announced that Mr Shanahan would be appointed to the role of Chief Justice of the Supreme Court of Tasmania and he was sworn in to that office, and as lieutenant-governor of Tasmania, on 20 January 2025.
