= Alan Blow =

Australian judge (born 1949)

The Honourable Alan Blow AO
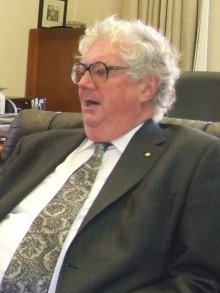
- Blow in 2016

14th Chief Justice of Tasmania
- In office 8 April 2013 – 2 December 2024
- Governor: Peter Underwood; Kate Warner; Barbara Baker
- Preceded by: Ewan Crawford
- Succeeded by: Chris Shanahan

Lieutenant-Governor of Tasmania
- In office 8 April 2013 – 2 December 2024
- Governor: Peter Underwood; Kate Warner; Barbara Baker

Personal details
- Born: Alan Michael Blow; 2 December 1949 (age 76) Sydney, Australia
- Education: University of Sydney
- Profession: Barrister

Alan Michael Blow AO (born 3 December 1949) is an Australian judge who was Chief Justice of Tasmania from 2013 to 2024. He currently holds appointment as an Acting Judge of the Supreme Court of the Northern Territory.

After graduating from the University of Sydney with Bachelor of Arts and Bachelor of Laws degrees, he practised as a barrister in civil litigation, criminal and family law, before being appointed as a judge of the Supreme Court of Tasmania in 2000. He was also a long time lecturer in Supreme Court Advocacy at the University of Tasmania's Centre for Legal Studies, teaching postgraduate legal practice students.

In 2009, Blow presided over the trial of Susan Neill-Fraser for the murder of Bob Chappell. He sentenced Neill-Fraser to 26 years’ imprisonment. The sentence was later reduced to 23 years’ imprisonment.

On 8 April 2013, Blow was appointed Chief Justice of Tasmania, replacing Ewan Crawford who had reached the mandatory retirement age of 72.

In 2018, Blow was appointed Officer of the Order of Australia for "distinguished service to the judiciary and to the law, particularly as Chief Justice of the Supreme Court of Tasmania, to legal education and professional standards, and to the community".

In December 2021, Blow would have reached compulsory retirement age of 72 for a Tasmanian Supreme Court Justice. However Tasmanian Parliament had extended the compulsory retirement age to 75 at Blow's request.

In December 2023, Blow came under criticism for a “grossly inappropriate” text message to Justice Gregory Geason, suggesting that he could resign to stop a parliament-led disciplinary process “going further”. Blow declined to make any public comment.

On 1 January 2025, Blow was appointed as an Acting Judge of the Supreme Court of the Northern Territory.

Legal offices
Preceded by Ewan Crawford	Chief Justice of Tasmania; 2013–2024	Succeeded by Chris Shanahan
