= United States case law topical index =

USA Legal Index

This is an organized index of United States Supreme Court articles on Wikipedia. Topics are listed alphabetically. If a topic has a sub-topic, the subtopic is listed under the main topic (e.g. Establishment Clause is listed under F as a sub-topic of First Amendment, rather than E).

== E ==
Ex Post Facto Clause

- Calder v. Bull, 3 U.S. 386 (1798)

== F ==
Fourth Amendment

- Search and Seizure Clause
  - Ex Parte Bollman, 8 U.S. 75 (1807)

== H ==
Habeas corpus

- Ex Parte Bollman, 8 U.S. 75 (1807)

== J ==
Judicial Review

- Hylton v. United States, 3 U.S. 171 (1796)
- Marbury v. Madison, 5 U.S. 137 (1803)

Jurisdiction

- Federal Question
  - State vs. Citizens of another State
    - Chisholm v. Georgia, 2 U.S. 419 (1793)

== S ==
Sovereign Immunity

- Chisholm v. Georgia, 2 U.S. 419 (1793)

== T ==
Taxing power

- Hylton v. United States, 3 U.S. 171 (1796)
