= Vincenzo Cangelosi =

Italian football manager (born 1963)

Personal information
- Date of birth: 12 October 1963 (age 63)
- Place of birth: Palermo, Italy
- Position: Goalkeeper

Team information
- Current team: Perugia (head coach)

Senior career*
Years	Team	Apps	(Gls)
1981–1983	Palermo	0	(0)
1984–1985	Kroton	4	(0)
1986–1987	Foggia	2	(0)
1987–1988	Siracusa	2	(0)

Managerial career
- 2022–2024: Casertana
- 2025: Perugia
- * Club domestic league appearances and goals

Vincenzo Cangelosi (born 12 October 1963) is an Italian football coach and former goalkeeper.

== Playing career ==
A goalkeeper who took his first steps as a youth player for his hometown club Palermo, Cangelosi had a minor career in the Italian leagues for teams such as Kroton, Foggia and Siracusa.

== Coaching career ==
In 1989, Cangelosi retired from active football to join his former youth coach Zdeněk Zeman, who he knows since the age of 11, as his assistant at Foggia.

Since then, Cangelosi consistently worked as Zeman's deputy for over 30 years, until his third coaching stint at Foggia in 2022.

In December 2022, at 59 years of age, Cangelosi took on his first head coaching role, being appointed in charge of Serie D club Casertana. Under his tenure, Casertana finished the season in third place in the Group G, later winning the playoff tournament and successively being readmitted to Serie C to fill a vacancy. He left Casertana by the end of the season after guiding the club to a fourth place in the league table.

On 19 February 2025, Cangelosi was hired as the new head coach of Serie C club Perugia, replacing Lamberto Zauli. He was sacked on 21 September 2025, after a negative start to the 2025–26 Serie C season.
