= Chief Justice of Tasmania =

Chief Justice of Supreme Court of Tasmania
- Royal Arms used by the Supreme Court of Tasmania
- Incumbent; Chris Shanahan since 20 January 2025
- Supreme Court of Tasmania
- Style: Chief Justice (informal); Your Honour (within court); The Honorable (formal, if sworn of the Tasmanian Executive Council)
- Status: Chief justice
- Member of: Judiciary of the State of Tasmania
- Seat: Tasmanian Supreme Court Building, Hobart
- Nominator: Attorney-General of Tasmania
- Appointer: The governor of Tasmania; with Executive Council and Cabinet deliberation
- Term length: None; Mandatory retirement at 75 years of age
- Constituting instrument: The Supreme Court Act 1887
- Formation: 1887

The chief justice of the Supreme Court of Tasmania is the senior judge of the Supreme Court of Tasmania, and the highest ranking judicial officer in the Australian state of Tasmania. The chief justice is both the judicial head of the Supreme Court as well as the administrative head, responsible for arranging the business of the court and establishing its rules and procedures. The current chief justice is Chris Shanahan, whose appointment was announced in 2024 by the Tasmanian Attorney-General. Justice Shanahan, who succeeded Alan Blow, who had been Chief Justice since 2013, assumed office on 20 January 2025.

Due to an age limit changed at the request of Chief Justice Blow, the incumbent chief justice must retire upon reaching the age of 75.

The chief justice also holds the role of lieutenant governor of Tasmania.

== List of chief justices of Tasmania ==
Name	Term as Chief Justice
Sir John Pedder	4 March 1824 – 4 May 1854
Sir Valentine Fleming	7 August 1854 – 31 December 1869
Sir Francis Smith	8 August 1870 – 7 February 1885
Sir William Lambert Dobson	7 February 1885 – 17 March 1898
Sir John Stokell Dodds	29 October 1898 – 26 June 1914
Sir Herbert Nicholls	1 July 1914 – 31 October 1937
Sir Harold Crisp	21 December 1937 – 14 April 1940
Sir John Morris	15 April 1940 – 3 July 1956
Sir Stanley Burbury	28 August 1956 – 29 October 1973
Sir Guy Green	30 October 1973 – 1 September 1995
William Cox	4 September 1995 – 1 December 2004
Peter Underwood	2 December 2004 – 28 March 2008
Ewan Crawford	24 April 2008 – 7 April 2013
Alan Blow	8 April 2013 – 2 December 2024
Chris Shanahan	20 January 2025 – present

== See also ==
- Judiciary of Australia
- Supreme Court of Tasmania
