= Ewan Crawford =

Australian judge

The Honourable Ewan Crawford AC

13th Chief Justice of Tasmania
- In office 24 April 2008 – 8 April 2013
- Preceded by: Peter Underwood
- Succeeded by: Alan Blow

Judge of the Supreme Court of Tasmania
- In office 1988–2013

Personal details
- Born: 8 April 1941 Launceston, Tasmania, Australia
- Died: 5 September 2023 Launceston, Tasmania, Australia

Ewan Charles Crawford, AC (born 8 April 1941) is an Australian judge and former Chief Justice of Tasmania.

== Early life ==
Crawford was born in Launceston to parents Sir George and Lady Crawford. He went to Launceston Church Grammar School.

He became a student of law in 1959 and worked as an Associate to Sir George Crawford.

== Career ==
He graduated from University of Tasmania on 12 May 1964 with a Bachelor of Laws with Honours. He was employed by Douglas and Collins, Barristers and Solicitors, in Launceston as a barrister and solicitor. At his swearing-in, he related that he had to send away his first client so that he could ask somebody to help him with his advice. He then gave the wrong advice to his second client, and had to call him back to set it straight. He took a year off in 1965 to travel overseas and returned as an employed solicitor in 1966. In 1968 he was made a partner of the firm. In that same year he married Robyn on 18 May, and they now have two sons and a daughter.

He was a Council Member of the Law Society of Tasmania between 1972 and 1984. He became President of the Law Society for 1979–1980. He was also involved in the Northern Regional Law Society, State Standing Committee for Legal Assistance and the Northern Area Legal Assistance Committee.

In 1988 Crawford was appointed as a judge of Tasmania's Supreme Court. He was appointed to the Council of the University of Tasmania from 1991 until 2001. He was a Member of the Board of Legal Education from 1997 until 2008, and a Member of the Law Admissions Consultative Committee from 1995 until 2008.

In 2002 Crawford was made a Fellow of the University of Tasmania.

It was announced on 8 April 2008 that Crawford was to be appointed Chief Justice following the appointment of Peter Underwood as Governor of Tasmania. His swearing in ceremony was held on 24 April 2008.

He was the first Chief Justice in Australia to have done away with the red and white robes and long ceremonial wigs in the Supreme Court. saying "Personally I feel they're out of date and unnecessary".

He retired as Chief Justice in April 2013 and also as Tasmania's Lieutenant Governor.

Legal offices
Preceded by Peter Underwood	Chief Justice of Tasmania; 2008–2013	Succeeded by Alan Blow
