= Magistrates Court of Tasmania =

Lowest court in Tasmania, Australia

- Arms of the Magistrates Court

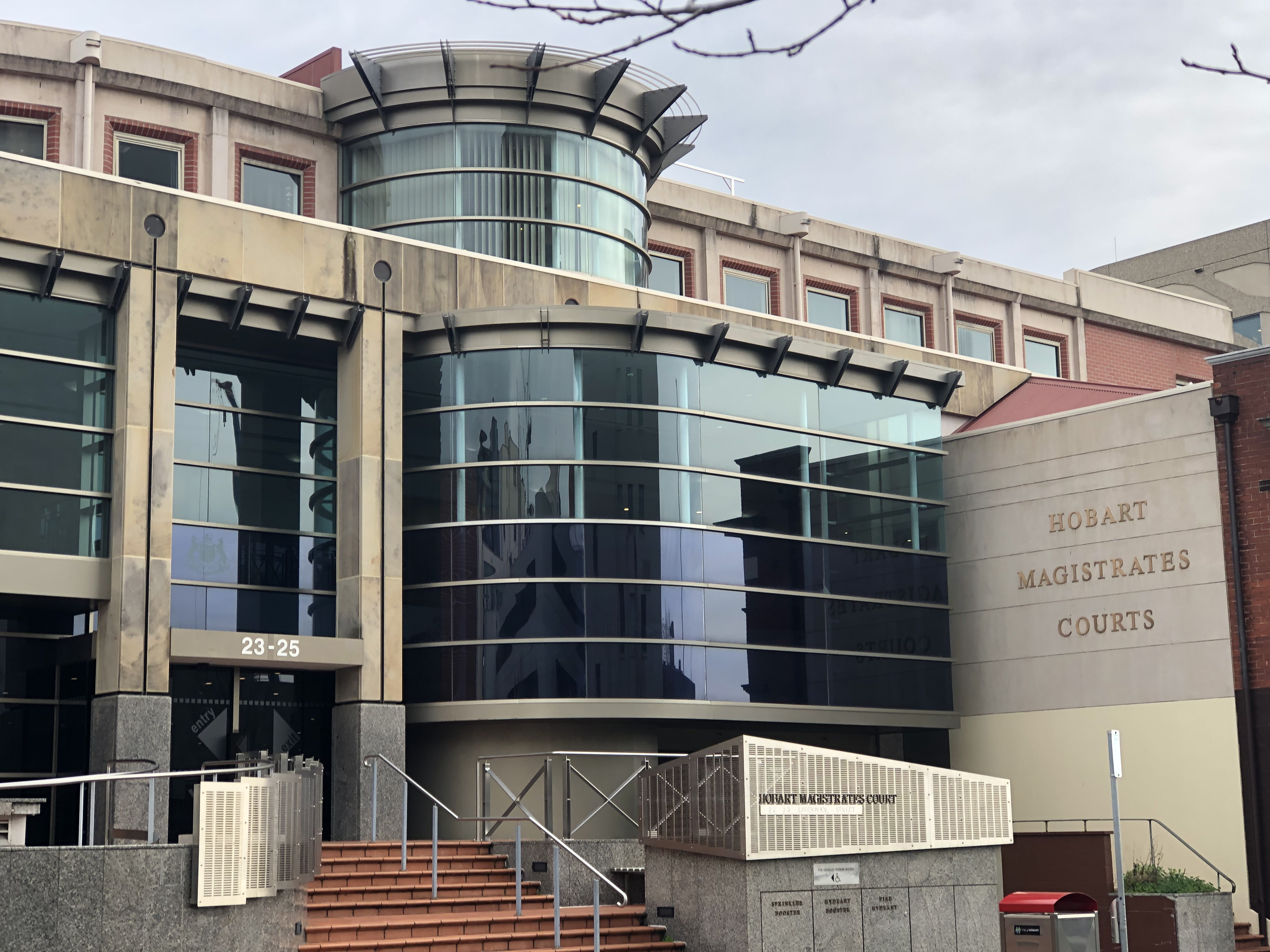
- Hobart Magistrates Courts
- Interactive map of Magistrates Court of Tasmania
- 42.879198°S 147.329429°E
- Jurisdiction: Tasmania
- Location: Hobart, Devonport, Burnie and Launceston
- Coordinates: 42.879198°S 147.329429°E
- Composition method: Vice-regal appointment unpon Premier's nomination, following advice of the Attorney General and the Executive Council.
- Authorised by: Parliament of Tasmania via the: Magistrates Court Act 1987 (TAS)
- Appeals to: Supreme Court of Tasmania
- Judge term length: Mandatory retirement by age of 75
- Number of positions: 17
- Website: www.magistratescourt.tas.gov.au

Chief Magistrate
- Currently: Catherine J Geason
- Since: 24 October 2016

Deputy Chief Magistrate
- Currently: K J Stanton

The Magistrates Court of Tasmania is the main day-to-day court in the Australian state of Tasmania and exists in accordance with the laws handed down by the Tasmanian Parliament. The Court is an inferior court to the Supreme Court of Tasmania and, in terms of the Australian court hierarchy, is at the bottom level. The Court hears more than 30,000 cases every year.

== Jurisdiction of the court ==
The Court has jurisdiction in a number of areas, including less serious criminal matters, civil claims involving less than $50,000 or where the parties consent, certain administrative appeals, child protection, youth justice, and coronial matters.

The majority of the Court's workload is in less serious (or "summary") offences; the Court also has jurisdiction over serious (or "indictable") crimes where the value of the property involved, or the nature of the crime, means that the matter may be heard by the Magistrates Court of Tasmania according to Tasmanian law. Criminal matters in the Magistrates Court are generally heard by a single magistrate sitting alone and do not involve a jury.

Serious criminal matters are heard by the Supreme Court of Tasmania after having been "committed" to the Supreme Court by the Magistrates' Court. This committal no longer involves an examination of whether or not the defendant has a case to answer but is normally a formal procedural step.

The Court also deals with civil disputes involving property valued at less than $50,000. Disputes involving $5,000 or less are heard by the Court's Civil Division as a minor civil claim.

Appeals from the Magistrates' Court of Tasmania in all matters are to a single judge of the Supreme Court of Tasmania.

== Structure of the court ==
The Magistrates' Court of Tasmania operates from four courthouses in Tasmania, located in Burnie, Devonport, Launceston and Hobart. All of these courthouses operate on a full-time basis and provide circuit courts to more regional and remote parts of the state of Tasmania.

The current list of magistrates of the Magistrates' Court of Tasmania are:

=== Burnie Courthouse ===
- Magistrate L Topfer
- Magistrate K Edwards

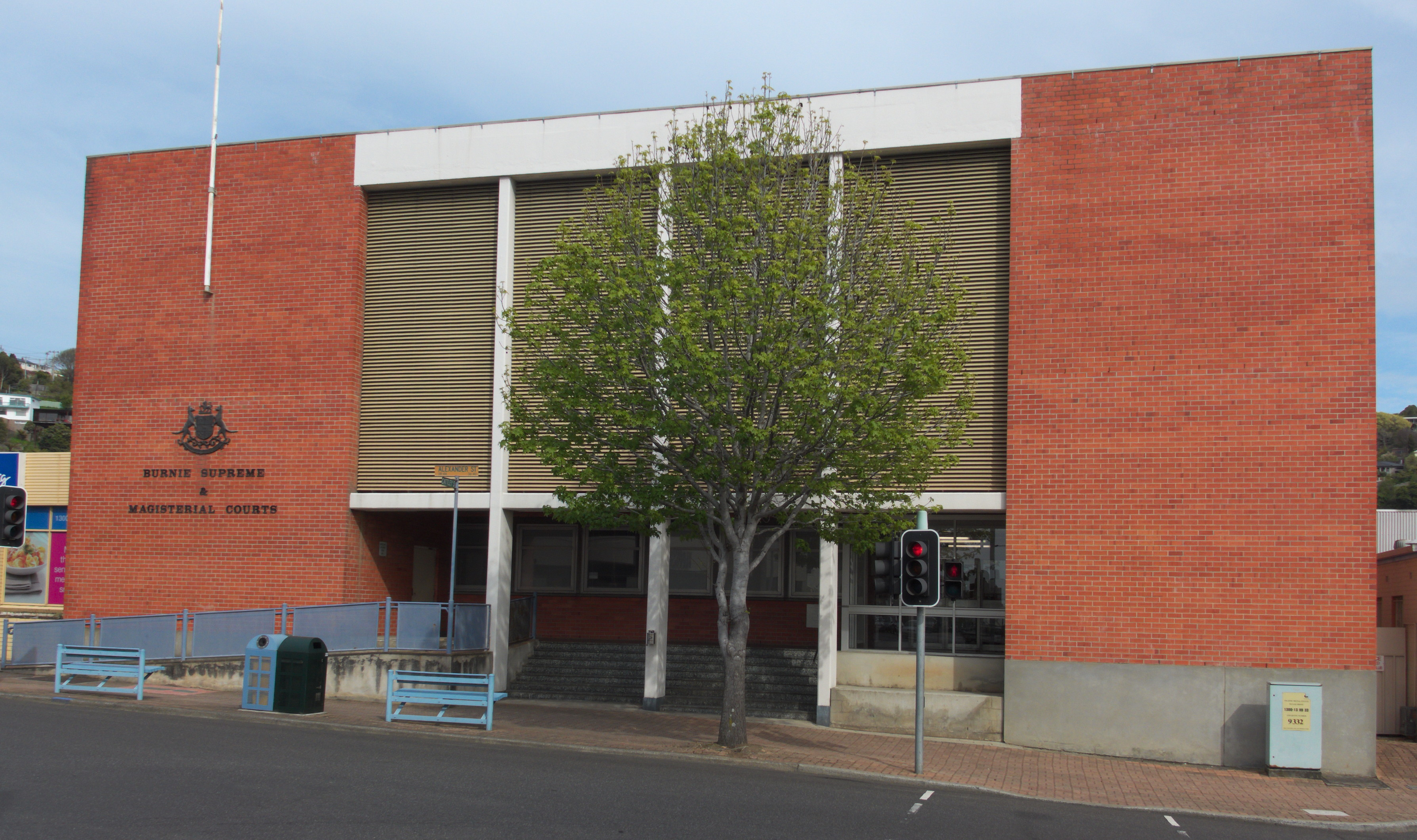
Burnie Supreme & Magisterial Courts

=== Devonport Courthouse ===
- Magistrate E Hughes
- Magistrate D R Fairley

=== Hobart Courthouse ===
- Chief Magistrate C J Geason
- Magistrate O McTaggart
- Magistrate C P Webster
- Magistrate R J Marron
- Magistrate A R McKee
- Magistrate R B Webster
- Magistrate J G Hartnett
- Magistrate M Duvnjak
- Magistrate L Mackey
- Magistrate M S Wilson

=== Launceston Courthouse ===
- Deputy Chief Magistrate K J Stanton
- Magistrate S J N Brown
- Magistrate S E Cure
- Magistrate E Hughes

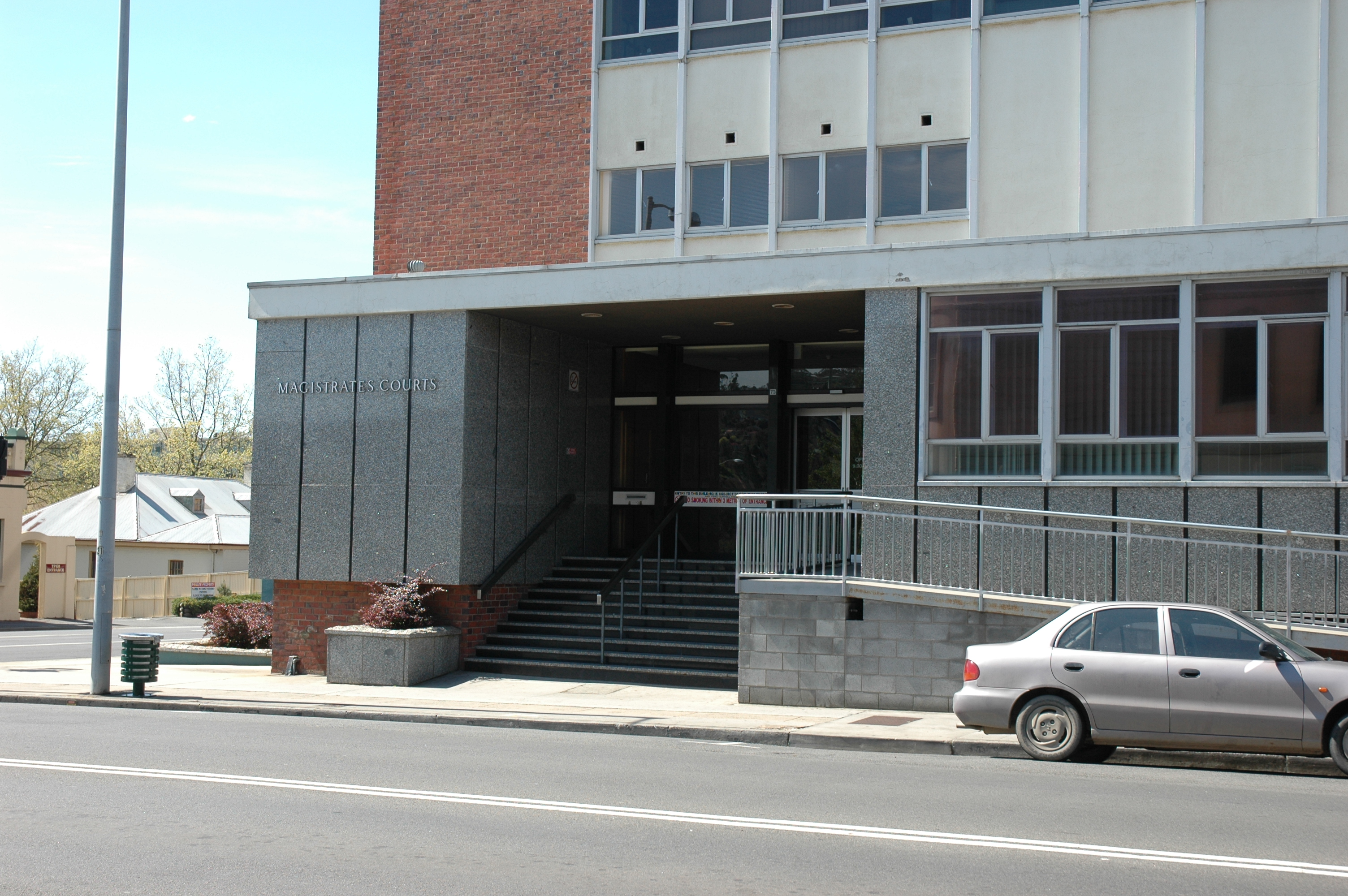
Launceston Magistrates Courts
