= Supreme Court of Tasmania =

Court in the Australian state of Tasmania

- The Royal Arms used by the Supreme Court of Tasmania

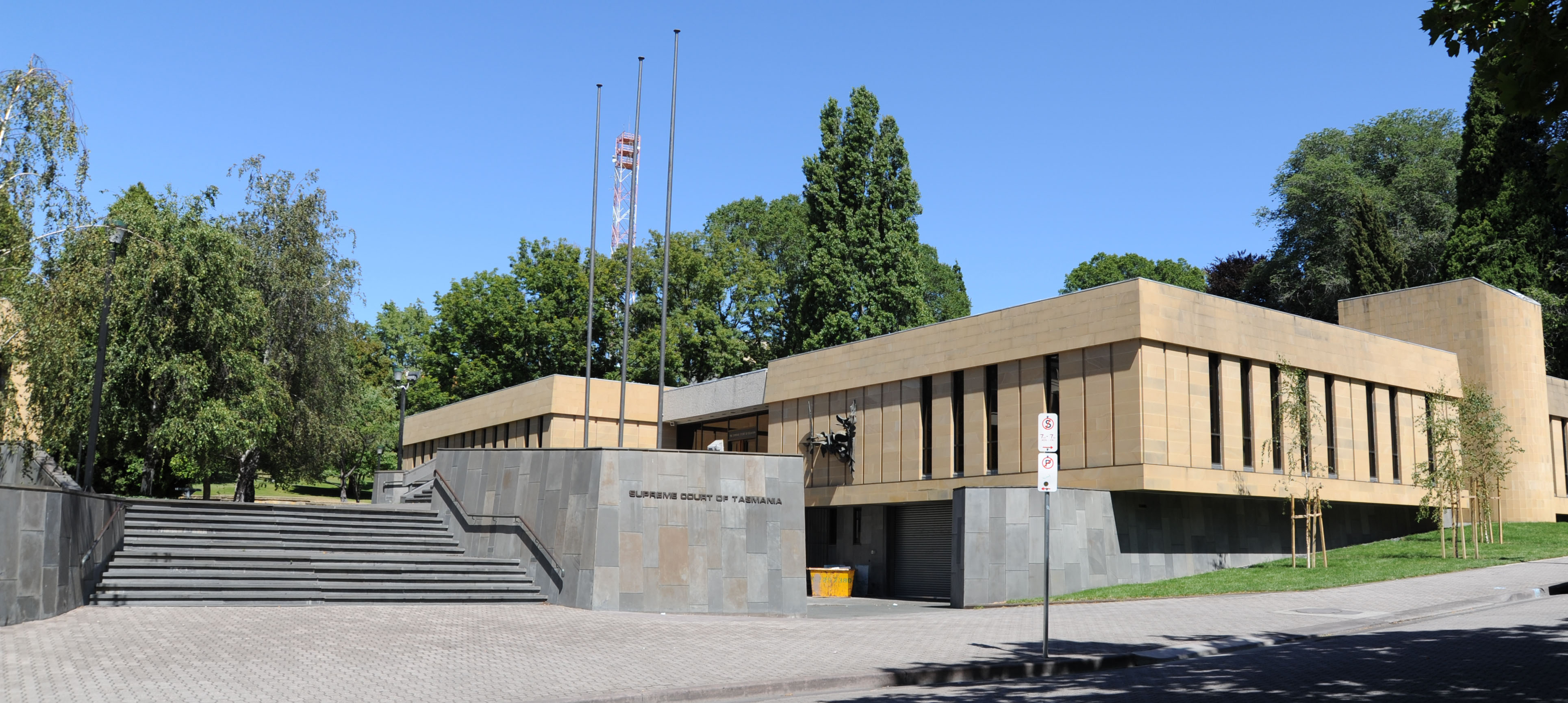
- Supreme Court of Tasmania building, Hobart
- Interactive map of Supreme Court of Tasmania
- 42°53′10″S 147°19′46″E
- Established: 10 May 1824
- Jurisdiction: Tasmania
- Location: Hobart
- Coordinates: 42°53′10″S 147°19′46″E
- Composition method: Vice-regal appointment upon Premier's nomination, following advice of the Attorney General and the Cabinet
- Authorised by: Parliament of Tasmania via the: Supreme Court Act 1959 (Tas)
- Appeals to: High Court of Australia
- Appeals from: Magistrates' Court of Tasmania
- Judge term length: Mandatory retirement by age of 75
- Number of positions: 7
- Website: supremecourt.tas.gov.au

Chief Justice of Tasmania
- Currently: Chris Shanahan
- Since: 20 January 2025

The Supreme Court of Tasmania is the highest State court in the Australian State of Tasmania. Together with the Magistrates Court, it forms the judiciary in Tasmania. In the Australian court hierarchy, the Supreme Court of Tasmania is in the middle level, with both an appellate jurisdiction over lower Tasmanian courts, with its own decisions being subject to appeal to the High Court of Australia. The Court has unlimited jurisdiction over Tasmanian civil matters and exclusive jurisdiction over Tasmanian criminal matters.

The ordinary sittings of the Court occur in Hobart, Launceston and Burnie in Tasmania. The Court's Appeal division sits only in Hobart.

== History ==
The Supreme Court of Van Diemen's Land (as Tasmania was then known) was established by letters patent of 13 October 1823 and commenced activities on 10 May 1824. The court is the oldest supreme court in Australia and predates the Supreme Court of New South Wales, if only by a period of just ten days. The supreme courts of Tasmania and New South Wales were initiated through the New South Wales Act 1823 (4 Geo. 4. c. 96), and this gave those courts jurisdiction over New Zealand. Sir John Pedder, after whom Lake Pedder is named, was the first Chief Justice of the court.

The first counsel to appear before the court was Joseph Tice Gellibrand, who was appointed Tasmania's first Attorney-General, and took his oaths on the first day of the new Court. The first case before the court was the trial of William Tibbs, who was found guilty and sentenced for manslaughter, receiving three years transportation.

Dorothy Shea, the court's librarian between 1988 and 2016, discovered that the court had the original copies of a large amount of Tasmanian legislation, dating back to 1833. Shea led the project to restore and relocate the legislation to the Tasmanian Archive and Heritage Office; the project was finished in just after Shea's death in 2024.

== Jurisdiction ==
It has unlimited jurisdiction within the state in civil matters and hears the most serious criminal matters. It is around the middle of the Australian court hierarchy. The Supreme Court consists of a Trial Division (also known as Original Jurisdiction) and an Appeal Division (or Appellate Jurisdiction). When sitting in its appellate jurisdiction in civil matters it is the "Full Court"; for criminal matters it is the "Tasmanian Court of Criminal Appeal".

Appeals from the Appeal Division of the Court are to the High Court of Australia. It was previously possible to appeal decisions of the Court of Appeal or the Court of Criminal Appeal (both parts of the Appeal Division) to the Judicial Committee of the Privy Council in London, but this ceased in 1986 when the Parliament of Australia passed the Australia Act 1986, which terminated all such appeals to the Privy Council from Australian courts, except for those cases pending at that time.

Civil matters involving consent orders, or for disputes involving less than $50,000, are dealt with by the Magistrates Court except in exceptional circumstances.

The Court receives appeals from Magistrate Courts in Tasmania in both criminal and civil matters. Committal proceedings, which are used in criminal matters to establish whether there is sufficient evidence against an accused person to warrant the time and expense of a trial, were abolished in Tasmania in 2000 with the amendment of the Justices Act 1959 (Tas). The Justices Act 1959 now provides that where there has been a plea of not guilty by an accused, there must be an order committing them for trial in the Supreme Court.

Unlike some other Australian states, Tasmania does not have an intermediate court division between the Supreme Court and the Magistrates Courts (such as a "District Court" or a "County Court").

== Composition ==
The Supreme Court of Tasmania is composed of up to seven judges appointed by the Governor on the advice of the Executive Council, a body of senior ministers including the state Premier. As of 15 July 2024, the judges of the Supreme Court of Tasmania are: The Associate Judge, a lower-ranking judicial officer previously called the Master, has responsibility for largely procedural matters in civil and criminal proceedings, and for some work in assessing the damages (amounts claimable) in civil proceedings.

Justices of the Supreme Court
Justice	Position	Commenced
Chief Justice	Chris Shanahan	2025
Justice	Helen Wood	2009
Justice	Stephen Estcourt	2013
Justice	Robert Pearce	2013
Justice	Michael Brett	2016
Justice	Tamara Jago	2021
Justice	Kate Cuthbertson	2025
Associate Justice	Michael Daly	2024

== Facilities ==
=== Building ===
The Hobart Supreme Court Complex is located on Salamanca Place in Hobart. The Supreme Court Complex was designed in 1972 by architect Peter Partridge of the Tasmanian Government's Public Works Department. Built in stages, the Criminal Court was opened in March 1975 and the Civil Courts and Registry opened in 1980. In 2010 the building was awarded the 25 Year Award for Enduring Architecture by Australian Institute of Architects, and in 2023 it was entered onto the Tasmanian Heritage Register on a permanent basis.

== Circuit court buildings ==
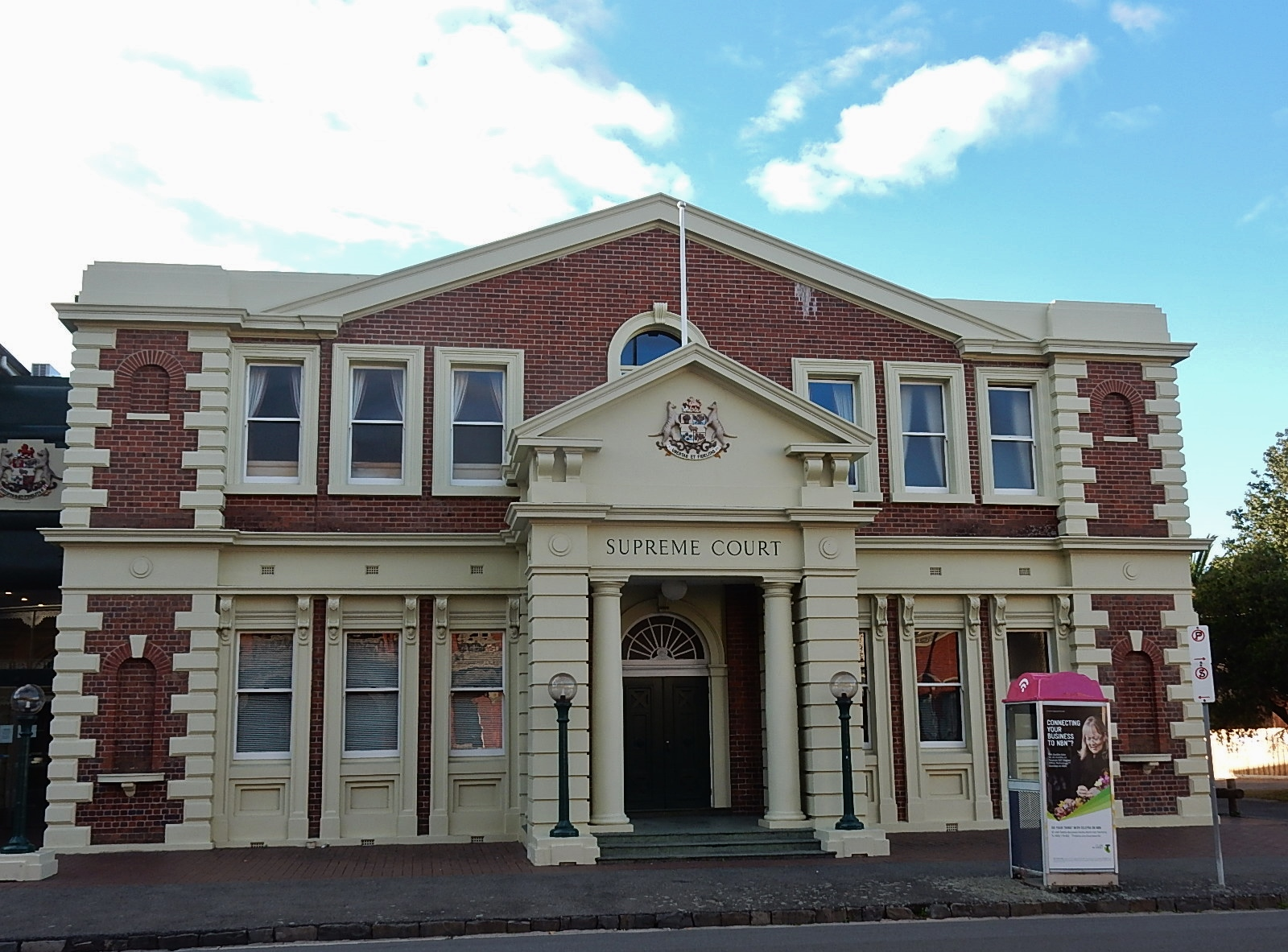
Launceston Supreme Court

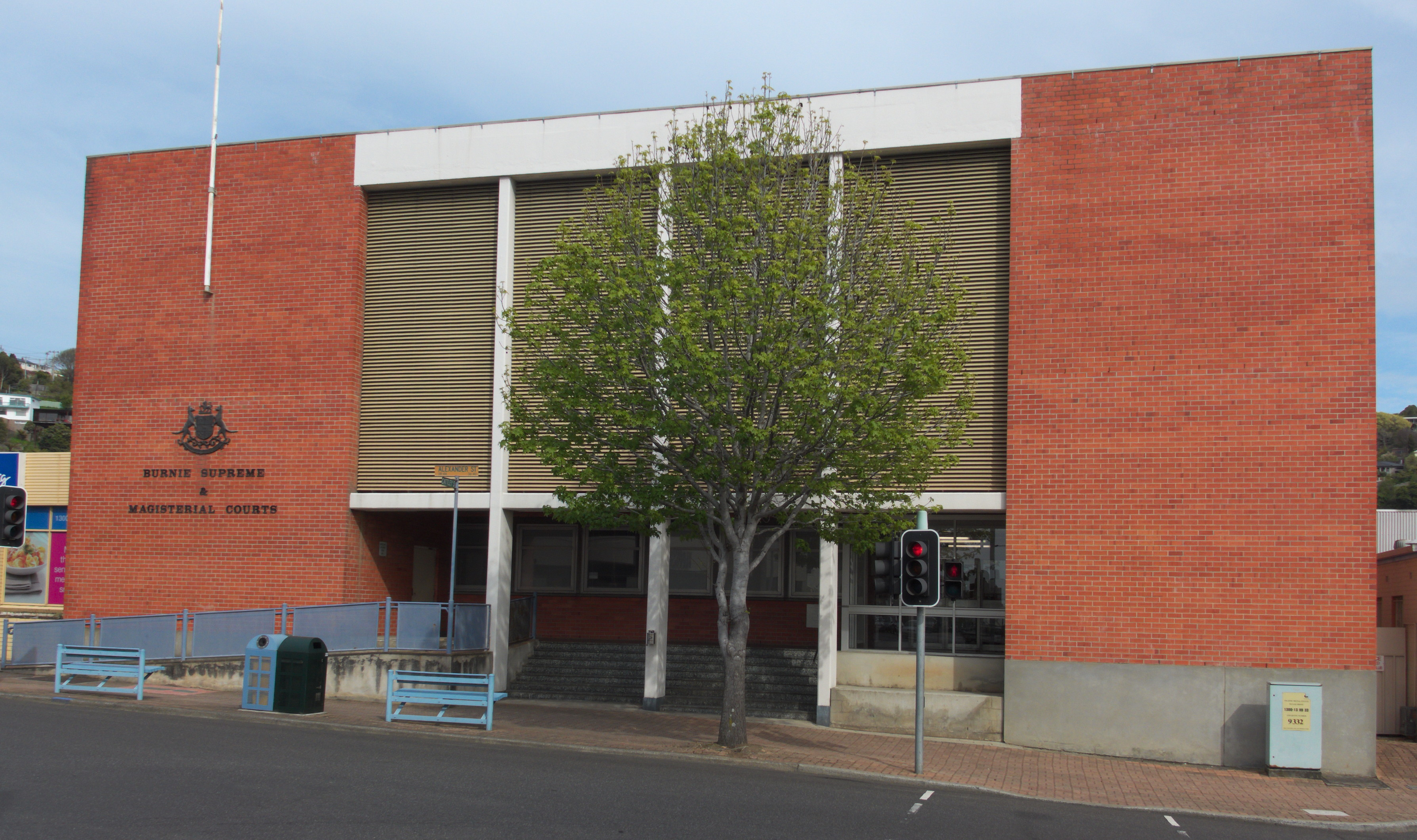
Burnie Supreme & Magisterial Courts

== See also ==
- Judiciary of Australia
- List of Judges of the Supreme Court of Tasmania
- List of Tasmanian Supreme Court cases
