= Members of the Tasmanian House of Assembly, 1872–1877 =

This is a list of members of the Tasmanian House of Assembly between the 1872 and the 1877 colonial elections.

Name	District	Years in office
John Balfe^{[X]}^{[13]}	South Launceston; West Hobart	1857–1872; 1874–1880
William Belbin	South Hobart	1871–1891
Charles Bromby^{[12]}	Central Launceston	1876–1878; 1881–1882
Nicholas John Brown^{[7]}	Cumberland	1875–1903
Henry Butler	Brighton	1856–1862; 1866–1885
James Castley^{[X]}	South Launceston	1872–1874
Thomas Chapman	East Hobart	1856–1864; 1866–1873
Alexander Clerke^{[5]}	Ringwood	1857–1860; 1862–1863; 1872–1874
James Cox^{[4]}	North Launceston	1872–1874; 1880–1882
Andrew Crawford^{[11]}	West Devon	1876–1877
James Dooley	East Devon	1872–1891
Sir Adye Douglas	Fingal	1856–1857; 1862–1884
Philip Fysh^{[2]}	East Hobart	1873–1878; 1894–1898
Robert Gayer^{[10]}	Queenborough	1876–1878
William Gellibrand^{[5]}	Ringwood	1871–1872; 1874–1886
William Giblin	Central Hobart	1869–1885
George Gilmore^{[8]}^{[12]}	Central Launceston	1875–1876; 1877–1878
James Gray^{[13]}	West Hobart	1872–1877; 1882–1889
James Gunn	Sorell	1872–1882
Samuel Henry	Deloraine	1872–1880
William Hodgson	Richmond	1861–1881
Frederick Houghton^{[11]}	Norfolk Plains	1859–1861; 1872–1876
Frederick Innes^{[1]}^{[3]}^{[4]}	Selby; North Launceston	1856–1862; 1872–1877
John Alexander Jackson^{[10]}	Queenborough	1871–1876
George Keach	Campbell Town	1870–1882
Henry Lette^{[8]}	Central Launceston	1862–1875; 1877–1892
David Lewis	Clarence	1864–1882
Charles Meredith^{[11]}	West Devon; Norfolk Plains	1856–1879
John Millar^{[6]}	Westbury	1871–1874
John Mitchell	Glamorgan	1871–1880
William Moore	Wellington	1871–1877
David Murray	Selby	1873–1877
Sir Robert Officer	Glenorchy	1856–1877
Christopher O'Reilly	Kingborough	1871–1882; 1906–1909
Alfred Pillinger^{[9]}	Oatlands	1876–1899
Thomas Reibey^{[6]}	Westbury	1874–1903
Alexander Riddoch	New Norfolk	1872–1882
George Salier	North Hobart	1866–1869; 1870–1886
James Scott	George Town	1869–1877; 1878–1884
James Reid Scott	Selby	1866–1872
John Swan^{[7]}	Cumberland	1863–1875
Samuel Tulloch^{[13]}	South Launceston	1877–1878
John Whitehead	Morven	1869–1880
George Wilson^{[9]}	Oatlands	1871–1876
Russell Young	Franklin	1871; 1872–1877

== Notes ==
^{1} In November 1872, James Reid Scott, the member for Selby, resigned. Frederick Innes, the Premier of Tasmania, was elected unopposed on 18 November 1872.
^{2} In July 1873, Thomas Chapman, the member for East Hobart, resigned. Philip Fysh was elected unopposed on 12 August 1873.
^{3} In November 1873, Frederick Innes, the member for Selby, resigned. David Murray won the resulting by-election on 16 December 1873.
^{4} In February 1874, James Cox, the member for North Launceston, resigned. Frederick Innes was elected unopposed on 31 March 1874.
^{5} In April 1874, Alexander Clerke, the member for Ringwood, resigned. William Gellibrand was elected unopposed on 15 May 1874.
^{6} In April 1874, John Millar, the member for Westbury, resigned. Thomas Reibey was elected unopposed on 23 May 1874.
^{7} In January 1875, John Swan, the member for Cumberland, resigned. Nicholas John Brown won the resulting by-election on 29 January 1875.
^{8} In April 1875, Henry Lette, the member for Central Launceston, resigned. George Gilmore was elected unopposed on 21 May 1875.
^{9} In June 1876, George Wilson, the member for Oatlands, resigned. Alfred Pillinger won the resulting by-election on 17 July 1876.
^{10} In June 1876, John Alexander Jackson, the member for Queenborough, resigned. Robert Gayer won the resulting by-election on 21 July 1876.
^{11} On 20 July 1876, Charles Meredith was appointed to the Ministry. He was therefore required to resign and contest a ministerial by-election. However, his nomination was ruled informal, and on 3 August 1876, the seat was declared for the only candidate, Andrew Crawford. Meredith was not without a seat for long, however—Frederick Houghton, the member for Norfolk Plains, resigned, and on 24 August 1876, Meredith was elected unopposed to that seat.
^{12} On 20 July 1876, George Gilmore was appointed to the Ministry. He was therefore required to resign and contest a ministerial by-election, at which he was defeated on 3 August 1876 by Charles Bromby.
^{13} In March 1877, James Gray, the member for West Hobart, resigned. John Balfe won the resulting by-election on 18 April 1877. Balfe, in running for the seat, had vacated his South Launceston seat, which was filled at the 27 April 1877 by-election by Samuel Tulloch.

== Sources ==
- Newman, Terry (1994). Representation of the Tasmanian People. Tasmanian Parliamentary Library. ISBN 0-7246-4147-5.
- Parliament of Tasmania (2006). The Parliament of Tasmania from 1856
