= Members of the Tasmanian House of Assembly, 1877–1882 =

This is a list of members of the Tasmanian House of Assembly between the 1877 elections and the 1882 elections.

Name	District	Years in office
John Balfe^{[11]}	West Hobart	1857–1872; 1874–1880
William Belbin	South Hobart	1871–1891
Edward Braddon^{[7]}	West Devon	1879–1888; 1893–1901
Charles Bromby	Norfolk Plains^{[3]} Richmond^{[12]}	1876–1878; 1881–1882
Nicholas John Brown	Cumberland	1875–1903
William Burgess^{[11]}	West Hobart	1881–1891; 1916–1917
Henry Butler	Brighton	1856–1862; 1866–1885
Andrew Inglis Clark^{[3]}	Norfolk Plains	1878–1882; 1887–1898
Audley Coote^{[6]}	George Town	1879–1886
James Cox^{[9]}	Morven	1872–1874; 1880–1882
Edward Crowther^{[4]}	Queenborough	1878–1912
Alfred Dobson	Glenorchy	1877–1887
John Dodds^{[5]}	East Hobart	1878–1887
James Dooley	East Devon	1872–1891
Sir Adye Douglas	Fingal	1856–1857; 1862–1884
Philip Fysh^{[5]}	East Hobart	1873–1878; 1894–1898
Robert Gayer^{[4]}	Queenborough	1876–1878
William Gellibrand	Ringwood	1871–1872; 1874–1886
William Giblin^{[1]}	Wellington	1869–1885
George Gilmore^{[6]}	George Town	1875–1876; 1877–1878
James Gunn	Sorell	1872–1882
William Hart	Central Launceston	1877–1885
Samuel Henry^{[8]}	Deloraine	1872–1880
William Hodgson	Richmond	1861–1881
Thomas Just	Selby	1877–1882
George Keach	Campbell Town	1870–1882
Henry Lamb	Clarence	1877–1886
Henry Lette	North Launceston	1862–1875; 1877–1892
David Lewis	Central Hobart	1864–1882
John Lyne^{[10]}	Glamorgan	1880–1893
Charles Meredith^{[7]}	West Devon	1856–1879
John Mitchell	Glamorgan	1871–1880
William Moore^{[1]}	Wellington	1871–1877
Christopher O'Reilly	Kingborough	1871–1882; 1906–1909
Alfred Pillinger	Oatlands	1876–1899
Thomas Reibey	Westbury	1874–1903
Alexander Riddoch	New Norfolk	1872–1882
Joseph Risby	Franklin	1877–1882
George Salier	North Hobart	1866–1869; 1870–1886
James Scott^{[2]}	South Launceston	1869–1877; 1878–1884
William Sleigh^{[8]}	Deloraine	1880–1882
Samuel Tulloch^{[2]}	South Launceston	1877–1878
John Whitehead^{[9]}	Morven	1869–1880

== Notes ==
^{1} In August 1877, William Moore, the member for Wellington, resigned to successfully contest the Mersey seat in the Legislative Council. William Giblin, the immediate former member for Central Hobart, the resulting by-election on 28 August 1877.
^{2} In July 1878, Samuel Tulloch, the member for South Launceston, resigned. James Scott, the former member for George Town, won the resulting by-election on 22 July 1878.
^{3} In July 1878, Charles Bromby, the member for Norfolk Plains, resigned. Andrew Inglis Clark won the resulting by-election on 26 July 1878.
^{4} In November 1878, Robert Gayer, the member for Queenborough, resigned. Edward Crowther won the resulting by-election on 26 November 1878.
^{5} In November 1878, Philip Fysh, the member for East Hobart, resigned. John Dodds won the resulting by-election on 26 November 1878.
^{6} In December 1878, George Gilmore, the member for George Town, resigned. Audley Coote won the resulting by-election on 11 January 1879.
^{7} In June 1879, Charles Meredith, the member for West Devon, resigned. Edward Braddon won the resulting by-election on 31 July 1879.
^{8} In April 1880, Samuel Henry, the member for Deloraine, resigned. William Sleigh won the resulting by-election on 24 April 1880.
^{9} In May 1880, John Whitehead, the member for Deloraine, resigned. James Cox won the resulting by-election on 27 May 1880.
^{10} On 16 November 1880, John Mitchell, the member for Glamorgan, died. John Lyne won the resulting by-election on 8 December 1880.
^{11} On 13 December 1880, John Balfe, the member for West Hobart, died. William Burgess won the resulting by-election on 5 January 1881.
^{12} In June 1881, William Hodgson, the member for Richmond, resigned to contest the Pembroke seat in the Legislative Council. Charles Bromby won the resulting by-election on 16 July 1881.

== Sources ==
- Parliament of Tasmania (2006). The Parliament of Tasmania from 1856
