= Members of the Tasmanian House of Assembly, 1882–1886 =

This is a list of members of the Tasmanian House of Assembly between the 1882 elections and the 1886 election.

Name	Affiliation^{[X]}	District	Years in office
William Henry Archer	Ministerial	Norfolk Plains	1882–1886
William Belbin	Ministerial	South Hobart	1871–1891
Stafford Bird	Ministerial	Franklin	1882–1903; 1904–1909
Edward Braddon	Opposition	West Devon	1879–1888; 1893–1901
William Brock^{[8]}	Ministerial	Richmond	1882–1885
Nicholas John Brown	Ministerial	Cumberland	1875–1903
William Brown^{[1]}	Opposition	Campbell Town	1882–1889; 1893–1903
William Burgess^{[4]}	Ministerial	West Hobart	1881–1891; 1916–1917
Henry Butler^{[9]}	Independent	Brighton	1856–1862; 1866–1885
Audley Coote	Opposition	George Town	1879–1886
Edward Crowther	Opposition	Queenborough	1878–1912
John Davies^{[3]}		Fingal	1884–1913
Alfred Dobson	Ministerial	Glenorchy	1877–1887
John Dodds^{[4]}	Ministerial	East Hobart	1878–1887
James Dooley	Opposition	East Devon	1872–1891
Sir Adye Douglas^{[3]}	Ministerial	Fingal	1856–1857; 1862–1884
John Falkiner	Ministerial	Morven	1882–1891
William Gellibrand	Ministerial	Ringwood	1871–1872; 1874–1886
William Giblin^{[7]}	Ministerial	Wellington	1869–1885
James Gray	Opposition	Sorell	1872–1877; 1882–1889
Charles Grubb^{[6]}	Ministerial	Selby	1882–1885
William Guesdon	Ministerial	Central Hobart	1882–1886
William Hart^{[10]}	Ministerial	Central Launceston	1877–1885
William Hartnoll^{[5]}	Ministerial	South Launceston	1884–1902
George Keach^{[1]}	Ministerial	Campbell Town	1870–1882
Henry Lamb	Ministerial	Clarence	1877–1886
Henry Lette	Opposition	North Launceston	1862–1875; 1877–1892
Alfred Lord^{[9]}		Brighton	1885–1886
Richard Lucas^{[2]}		Kingborough	1883–1887
John Lyne	Ministerial	Glamorgan	1880–1893
Christopher O'Reilly^{[2]}	Ministerial	Kingborough	1871–1882; 1906–1909
Alfred Pillinger	Opposition	Oatlands	1876–1899
Thomas Reibey	Opposition	Westbury	1874–1903
Henry Rooke	Ministerial	Deloraine	1882–1886
George Salier	Ministerial	North Hobart	1866–1869; 1870–1886
James Scott^{[5]}	Opposition	South Launceston	1869–1877; 1878–1884
Ebenezer Shoobridge	Ministerial	New Norfolk	1882–1886
William Sidebottom^{[6]}		Selby	1885–1893
James Norton Smith^{[7]}		Wellington	1885–1886
George Stokell^{[8]}	Ministerial	Richmond	1885–1886

== Notes ==
^{X} The affiliations listed are as reported in The Mercury on 3 June 1882.
^{1} At the 1882 election, George Keach, the member for Campbell Town, was re-elected, but was declared not to have been duly elected. William Brown won a subsequent by-election on 28 July 1882.
^{2} On 1 December 1882, one of the two members for Kingborough, Christopher O'Reilly, resigned. Richard Lucas won the resulting by-election on 20 January 1883.
^{3} On 15 August 1884, Sir Adye Douglas, the member for Fingal, became Premier and Chief Secretary. As such he was required to resign and contest a ministerial by-election, however he opted to contest the recently vacated Legislative Council division of South Esk, which he won on 21 August 1884. At the close of nominations on 27 August 1884 for the by-election called to select his successor in Fingal, John Davies was elected unopposed.
^{[4]} Two other members were required to resign on 15 August 1884 and contest ministerial by-elections; they were both re-elected unopposed a week later.
^{5} On 15 October 1884, the member for South Launceston, James Scott, died. William Hartnoll won the resulting by-election on 12 November 1884.
^{6} In February 1885, the member for Selby, Charles Grubb, resigned. William Sidebottom won the resulting by-election on 25 February 1885.
^{7} On 11 February 1885, the member for Wellington and former Premier William Giblin resigned. James Norton Smith won the resulting by-election on 2 March 1885.
^{8} In July 1885, the member for Richmond, William Brock, resigned. George Stokell won the resulting by-election on 1 August 1885.
^{9} On 22 August 1885, the member for Brighton, Henry Butler, died. Alfred Lord won the resulting by-election on 16 September 1885.
^{10} In December 1885, the member for Central Launceston, William Hart, resigned to contest the Legislative Council division of Launceston, which he won on 21 December 1885. No election was held to replace him and the Assembly seat was abolished at the following election.

== Sources ==
- Parliament of Tasmania (2006). The Parliament of Tasmania from 1856
