= Members of the Tasmanian House of Assembly, 1891–1893 =

This is a list of members of the Tasmanian House of Assembly between the 1891 election and the 1893 election.

Party affiliations were relatively loose during the period. In the table below, "Ministerial" relates to supporters of Philip Fysh, who served as Premier of Tasmania until 17 August 1892, and "Opposition" refers to a number of other groups, several of which supported Henry Dobson who became Premier after this time.

Name	Party	District	Years in office
Peter Barrett	Opposition	North Launceston	1886–1897
William Bennett	Opposition/Independent	Campbell Town	1889–1893; 1903–1909
Stafford Bird	Ministerial	Franklin	1882–1903; 1904–1909
Nicholas John Brown	Opposition	Cumberland	1875–1903
William Burgess^{[2]}	Opposition	West Hobart	1881–1891; 1916–1917
Daniel Burke^{[7]}	Opposition	Cressy	1893–1903
Andrew Inglis Clark	Ministerial	South Hobart	1878–1882; 1887–1898
Harry Conway	Ministerial/Independent	George Town	1886–1893
Alfred Crisp	Ministerial/Opposition	North Hobart	1886–1900
Edward Crowther	Ministerial/Independent	Kingborough	1878–1912
John Davies	Opposition	Fingal	1884–1913
Thomas Dillon^{[1]}	Ministerial	Brighton	1891
Henry Dobson^{[1]}	Opposition	Brighton	1891–1900
Henry Dumaresq	Ministerial/Opposition	Longford	1886–1903
Charles Featherstone^{[6]}	Ministerial	Sorell	1889–1893
Charles Fenton (senior)	Opposition	Wellington	1886–1897
Alexander Fowler^{[5]}	Independent	North Launceston	1893; 1897–1901
Edward Giblin	Independent	South Hobart	1891–1893
Henry Gill	Ministerial/Independent	Kingborough	1887–1897
John Hamilton	Ministerial/Independent	Glenorchy	1887–1903
John Hart	Ministerial/Opposition	Deloraine	1886–1893
William Hartnoll^{[3]}	Opposition	South Launceston	1884–1902
Samuel Hawkes	Ministerial	Ringarooma	1886–1893
John Henry^{[3]}	Opposition	East Devon	1891–1897
George Hiddlestone	Opposition	West Hobart	1891–1897
George Leatham	Ministerial	New Norfolk	1891–1903; 1906–1909
Henry Lette^{[4]}	Independent	North Launceston	1862–1875; 1877–1892
Elliott Lewis^{[3]}	Opposition	Richmond	1886–1903; 1909–1922
John Lyne	Opposition	Glamorgan	1880–1893
John McCall	Independent	West Devon	1888–1893; 1901–1909
Charles Mackenzie	Opposition	Wellington	1886–1909
Edward Mulcahy^{[2]}	Ministerial	West Hobart	1891–1903; 1910–1919
Henry Murray	Opposition	East Devon	1891–1900; 1902–1909
Alfred Pillinger	Ministerial	Oatlands	1876–1899
Thomas Reibey	Ministerial	Westbury	1874–1903
Windle St Hill	Ministerial/Independent	North Hobart	1886–1893
David Scott^{[4]}^{[5]}	Independent	North Launceston	1886–1891; 1892–1893
William Sidebottom	Opposition	Selby	1885–1893
John von Stieglitz	Independent	Evandale	1891–1903
Edmund Henry Sutton^{[7]}	Ministerial	Cressy	1886–1893
Samuel Sutton	Opposition	South Launceston	1891–1897; 1901–1903
Joseph Woollnough^{[6]}	Ministerial	Sorell	1893–1903

== Notes ==
^{1} On 25 July 1891, the election of the Ministerial member for Brighton, Thomas Dillon, was declared void under the Electoral Act 1890 following a petition by the unsuccessful candidate and incumbent member, Henry Mugliston, alleging Dillon had engaged in corrupt practices and bribery during the campaign. Henry Dobson, the Opposition candidate, won the resulting by-election on 12 August 1891.
^{2} In August 1891, William Burgess, one of the two members for West Hobart, resigned. Edward Mulcahy won the resulting by-election on 19 August 1891.
^{3} On 17 August 1892, following the fall of the Fysh government, Henry Dobson was invited to form a government which included three Assembly members. These members were therefore required to resign and contest ministerial by-elections. On 26 August 1892, all of them were returned unopposed.
^{4} On 5 August 1892, Henry Lette, one of the two members for North Launceston, died. David Scott won the resulting by-election on 9 September 1892.
^{5} On 11 January 1893, just four months into his term, David Scott, one of the two members for North Launceston, died. Alexander Fowler won the resulting by-election on 31 January 1893.
^{6} In March 1893, Charles Featherstone, the member for Sorell, was disqualified due to bankruptcy. Joseph Woollnough won the resulting by-election on 18 April 1893.
^{7} On 24 April 1893, Edmund Henry Sutton, the member for Cressy, died. Daniel Burke won the resulting by-election on 16 May 1893.

== Sources ==
- Hughes, Colin A.; Graham, B. D. (1976). Voting for the South Australian, Western Australian and Tasmanian Lower Houses, 1890-1964. Canberra: Australian National University. ISBN 0-7081-1334-6.
- Parliament of Tasmania (2006). The Parliament of Tasmania from 1956
