= Members of the Tasmanian House of Assembly, 1886–1891 =

This is a list of members of the Tasmanian House of Assembly between the 1886 election and the 1891 election.

Name	District	Years in office
Peter Barrett	North Launceston	1886–1897
William Belbin	South Hobart	1871–1891
William Bennett^{[8]}	Campbell Town	1889–1893; 1903–1909
Stafford Bird^{[4]}	Franklin	1882–1903; 1904–1909
Edward Braddon^{[4]}^{[6]}	West Devon	1879–1888; 1893–1901
Nicholas John Brown	Cumberland	1875–1903
William Brown^{[8]}	Campbell Town	1882–1889; 1893–1903
William Burgess	West Hobart	1881–1891; 1916–1917
Andrew Inglis Clark^{[2]}^{[4]}	South Hobart	1878–1882; 1887–1898
Harry Conway	George Town	1886–1893
Alfred Crisp	North Hobart	1886–1900
Edward Crowther	Kingborough	1878–1912
John Davies	Fingal	1884–1913
Alfred Dobson^{[5]}	Glenorchy	1877–1887
John Dodds^{[2]}	South Hobart	1878–1887
James Dooley^{[10]}	East Devon	1872–1891
Henry Dumaresq	Longford	1886–1903
John Falkiner	Evandale	1882–1891
Charles Featherstone^{[7]}	Sorell	1889–1893
Charles Fenton (senior)	Wellington	1886–1897
George Fitzgerald	West Hobart	1886–1891
Henry Gill^{[3]}	Kingborough	1887–1897
James Gray^{[7]}	Sorell	1872–1877; 1882–1889
John Hamilton^{[5]}	Glenorchy	1887–1903
John Hart	Deloraine	1886–1893
William Hartnoll	South Launceston	1884–1902
Samuel Hawkes	Ringarooma	1886–1893
George Huston^{[9]}	New Norfolk	1886–1890
George Leatham^{[9]}	New Norfolk	1891–1903; 1906–1909
Henry Lette	North Launceston	1862–1875; 1877–1892
Elliott Lewis	Richmond	1886–1903; 1909–1922
Richard Lucas^{[3]}	Kingborough	1883–1887
John Lyne	Glamorgan	1880–1893
John McCall^{[6]}	West Devon	1888–1893; 1901–1909
Charles Mackenzie	Wellington	1886–1909
Henry Mugliston	Brighton	1886–1891
Henry Murray^{[10]}	East Devon	1891–1900; 1902–1909
Alfred Pillinger^{[5]}	Oatlands	1876–1899
Thomas Reibey	Westbury	1874–1903
Windle St Hill	North Hobart	1886–1893
David Scott	South Launceston	1886–1891; 1892–1893
William Sidebottom	Selby	1885–1893
Edmund Henry Sutton	Cressy	1886–1893
Arthur Young	East Devon	1886–1891

== Notes ==
^{1} Significant changes to seats occurred at the 1886 election, with several old seats abolished and a net gain of four seats.
^{2} In February 1887, the Attorney-General and member for one of the two South Hobart seats, John Dodds, resigned. Andrew Inglis Clark won the resulting by-election on 4 March 1887.
^{3} On 15 February 1887, Richard Lucas, one of the two members for Kingborough, was appointed Attorney-General in James Agnew's Ministry. He was therefore required to resign and contest a ministerial by-election in his seat. On 15 March 1887, an Opposition candidate, Henry Gill, defeated Lucas at the by-election. The Agnew ministry subsequently fell and Philip Fysh was invited to form a government, which took office on 29 March 1887.
^{4} Following the Fysh ministry's appointment on 29 March 1887, the new ministers were required to resign and contest ministerial by-elections. All were returned unopposed a week later.
^{5} In May 1887, the member for Glenorchy, Alfred Dobson, resigned. John Hamilton won the resulting by-election on 20 June 1887.
^{6} On 29 October 1888, the member for West Devon and Minister for Lands and Works, Edward Braddon, resigned to take up the role of Agent-General for Tasmania in London. John McCall won the resulting by-election on 12 November 1888. Alfred Pillinger replaced Braddon in the Ministry and was returned unopposed at a ministerial by-election on 6 November 1888.
^{7} On 21 January 1889, the member for Sorell, James Gray, died. Charles Featherstone won the resulting by-election on 11 February 1889.
^{8} On 1 April 1889, the member for Campbell Town, William Brown, resigned. William Bennett won the resulting by-election on 30 April 1889.
^{9} On 18 December 1890, the member for New Norfolk, George Huston, died. George Leatham won the resulting by-election on 13 January 1891.
^{10} On 5 February 1891, one of the two members for East Devon, James Dooley, died. Henry Murray won the resulting by-election held later in the month.

== Sources ==
- Hughes, Colin A.; Graham, B. D. (1976). Voting for the South Australian, Western Australian and Tasmanian Lower Houses, 1890-1964. Canberra: Australian National University. ISBN 0-7081-1334-6.
- Parliament of Tasmania (2006). The Parliament of Tasmania from 1856
