= Members of the Tasmanian House of Assembly, 1871–1872 =

This is a list of members of the Tasmanian House of Assembly between the 1871 elections and the 1872 elections.

Name	District	Years in office
Basil Archer^{[2]}	Ringwood	1871–1872
John Balfe^{[1]}	West Hobart	1857–1872; 1874–1880
William Belbin	South Hobart	1871–1891
Henry Butler	Brighton	1856–1862; 1866–1885
Thomas Chapman	East Hobart	1856–1864; 1866–1873
James Cox^{[3]}	North Launceston	1872–1874; 1880–1882
John Davies^{[4]}	Franklin	1861; 1862–1872
Adye Douglas	Norfolk Plains	1856–1857; 1862–1884
William Gellibrand	Fingal	1871–1872; 1874–1886
William Giblin	Central Hobart	1869–1885
James Gray^{[1]}	West Hobart	1872–1877; 1882–1889
Thomas Gregson	Richmond	1856–1872
William Hodgson	Sorell	1861–1881
Frederick Houghton^{[2]}	Ringwood	1859–1861; 1872–1876
John Alexander Jackson	Queenborough	1871–1876
George Keach	Campbell Town	1870–1882
Henry Lette	Central Launceston	1862–1875; 1877–1892
David Lewis	Clarence	1864–1882
Charles Meredith	West Devon	1856–1879
John Millar	Westbury	1871–1874
John Mitchell	Glamorgan	1871–1880
William Moore	Wellington	1871–1877
Sir Robert Officer	Glenorchy	1856–1877
Christopher O'Reilly	Kingborough	1871–1882; 1906–1909
Charles Rocher^{[3]}	North Launceston	1870–1872
Adolphus Rooke	East Devon	1856–1862; 1868–1869; 1871–1872
James Scott	George Town	1869–1877; 1878–1884
James Reid Scott	Selby	1866–1872
George Salier	North Hobart	1866–1869; 1870–1886
William Sharland	New Norfolk	1861–1872
Samuel Shorey	Deloraine	1871–1872
John Swan	Cumberland	1863–1875
Thomas Thomas	South Launceston	1871–1872
John Whitehead	Morven	1869–1880
George Wilson	Oatlands	1871–1876
Russell Young^{[4]}	Franklin	1871; 1872–1877

== Notes ==
^{1} In January 1872, John Balfe, the member for West Hobart, resigned. James Gray won the resulting by-election on 6 February 1872.
^{2} In March 1872, Basil Archer, the member for Ringwood, resigned. Frederick Houghton won the resulting by-election on 25 April 1872.
^{3} In May 1872, Charles Rocher, the member for North Launceston, resigned. James Cox won the resulting by-election on 28 June 1872.
^{4} On 11 June 1872, John Davies, the member for Franklin, died. Russell Young was elected unopposed on 4 July 1872.

== Sources ==
- Newman, Terry (1994). Representation of the Tasmanian People. Tasmanian Parliamentary Library. ISBN 0-7246-4147-5.
- Parliament of Tasmania (2006). The Parliament of Tasmania from 1856
