= Members of the Tasmanian House of Assembly, 1893–1897 =

This is a list of members of the Tasmanian House of Assembly between the 1893 election and the 1897 election.

Party affiliations were relatively loose during the period. In the table below, "Ministerial" relates to supporters of Henry Dobson, who served as Premier of Tasmania until 14 April 1894, and "Liberal" refers to an opposition group which came to support Sir Edward Braddon, who served as Premier for the rest of the term.

Name	Party	District	Years in office
Frank Archer	Ministerial/Liberal	Selby	1893–1902
Peter Barrett	Ministerial	North Launceston	1886–1897
Jonathan Best^{[4]}	Liberal	Deloraine	1894–1897; 1899–1912; 1913
Stafford Bird	Opposition/Independent	Franklin	1882–1903; 1904–1909
Sir Edward Braddon	Liberal	West Devon	1879–1888; 1893–1901
John Bradley	Independent/Liberal	South Hobart	1893–1900
Nicholas John Brown^{[1]}	Ministerial	Cumberland	1875–1903
William Brown	Opposition/Independent	Campbell Town	1882–1889; 1893–1903
Daniel Burke	Ministerial	Cressy	1893–1903
Norman Cameron^{[4]}	Independent	Deloraine	1893–1894; 1897–1899; 1912–1913; 1925–1928
Andrew Inglis Clark^{[3]}	Liberal	South Hobart	1878–1882; 1887–1898
Alfred Crisp	Ministerial/Liberal	North Hobart	1886–1900
Edward Crowther	Independent/Liberal	Kingborough	1878–1912
John Davies	Ministerial/Independent	Fingal	1884–1913
Henry Dobson	Ministerial	Brighton	1891–1900
Henry Dumaresq	Ministerial/Liberal	Longford	1886–1903
Charles Fenton Sr.	Independent	Wellington	1886–1897
Sir Philip Fysh^{[3]}	Liberal	North Hobart	1873–1878; 1894–1898
Henry Gill	Independent	Kingborough	1887–1897
George Gilmore	Ministerial	George Town	1893–1900; 1903–1906
John Hamilton	Independent/Liberal	Glenorchy	1887–1903
William Hartnoll	Ministerial	South Launceston	1884–1902
John Henry	Ministerial	East Devon	1891–1897
George Hiddlestone	Opposition/Independent	West Hobart	1891–1897
George Leatham	Liberal	New Norfolk	1891–1903; 1906–1909
Elliott Lewis	Ministerial	Richmond	1886–1903; 1909–1922
Allan MacDonald	Independent	North Launceston	1893–1897
Charles Mackenzie	Ministerial	Wellington	1886–1909
William McWilliams	Liberal	Ringarooma	1893–1900
Edward Miles	Independent/Liberal	Glamorgan	1883–1899; 1900
Edward Mulcahy	Liberal	West Hobart	1891–1903; 1910–1919
Henry Murray	Ministerial	East Devon	1891–1900; 1902–1909
Frederick William Piesse^{[3]}	Liberal	North Hobart	1893–1894
Alfred Pillinger	Liberal	Oatlands	1876–1899
Thomas Reibey	Liberal	Westbury	1874–1903
John von Stieglitz	Ministerial	Evandale	1891–1903
Samuel Sutton	Ministerial	South Launceston	1891–1897; 1901–1903
Don Urquhart^{[1]}^{[2]}	Liberal	Montagu	1894–1903; 1906–1909
Joseph Woollnough	Ministerial	Sorell	1893–1903

== Notes ==
^{1} In December 1893, the election of the Independent member for Cumberland, Don Urquhart, who had won the seat from incumbent member Nicholas John Brown by 12 votes, was declared void. At the close of nominations for the resulting by-election on 24 February 1894, Brown was re-elected unopposed.
^{2} The seat of Montagu was created after the election, and a by-election was held on 2 March 1894 to choose a member for the seat. Don Urquhart won the by-election.
^{3} On 14 April 1894, following the fall of the Dobson government, Edward Braddon was invited to form a government. These members were therefore required to resign and contest ministerial by-elections. Additionally, Sir Philip Fysh opted to transfer from his Legislative Council seat to contest a North Hobart vacancy created by the resignation of Frederick William Piesse from the House. On 24 April 1894, Fysh and Andrew Inglis Clark were returned unopposed, whilst Alfred Pillinger was returned six days later in a contested election. Piesse, meanwhile, ran for and won the Council vacancy caused by Fysh's resignation from that House in a by-election on 8 May 1894.
^{4} In May 1894, Norman Cameron, the Independent member for Deloraine, resigned and recontested his seat in a by-election. He was defeated by Liberal candidate Jonathan Best on 25 May 1894.

== Sources ==
- Hughes, Colin A.; Graham, B. D. (1976). Voting for the South Australian, Western Australian and Tasmanian Lower Houses, 1890-1964. Canberra: Australian National University. ISBN 0-7081-1334-6.
- Parliament of Tasmania (2006). The Parliament of Tasmania from 1956
