= Members of the Tasmanian House of Assembly, 1903–1906 =

This is a list of members of the Tasmanian House of Assembly between the 2 April 1903 election and the 29 March 1906 election.

The Hare-Clark system being trialled in Hobart and Launceston came to an end at the 1903 election, and several seats in the rural region between the two centres either merged or changed substantially. Possibly the most significant result was the failure of the Premier of Tasmania, Elliott Lewis, to win a seat—formerly the member for abolished Richmond, he ran for the new Central Hobart seat, and was beaten by Herbert Nicholls, an opposition backbencher with only two years' parliamentary experience, by a substantial margin. The election also saw an increased participation by the fledgling Labor Party, which won four of the six seats it contested, all of which were in mining areas of the state. Future Labor premier John Earle was beaten in Waratah by four votes, whilst future federal MHR Jens Jensen and senator James Long also commenced their parliamentary careers.

Name	Party	District	Years in office
Charles Allen	Liberal	Westbury	1903–1909
William Batchelor	Liberal/Independent	North Launceston	1903–1906
William Bennett	Liberal/Ministerial	Cambria	1889–1893; 1903–1909
Jonathan Best	Liberal/Independent	Deloraine	1894–1897; 1899–1912; 1913
Stafford Bird^{[5]}	Ministerial	South Hobart	1882–1903; 1904–1909
Frank Bond	Liberal/Ministerial	East Hobart	1903–1906; 1909–1921
George Brettingham-Moore	Liberal	West Hobart	1903–1909
Julian Brown	Ministerial/Independent	New Norfolk	1903–1906
Nicholas John Brown^{[2]}	Ministerial	Cumberland	1875–1903
William Brownell	Liberal/Ministerial	Franklin	1903–1909
George Burns	Labor	Queenstown	1903–1906
Edward Crowther	Ministerial	Queenborough	1878–1912
John George Davies	Independent	Fingal	1884–1913
Henry Dumaresq^{[1]}	Ministerial	Longford	1886–1903
Henry Dumbleton	Independent/Ministerial	Devonport	1903–1906
John Evans	Ministerial	Kingborough	1897–1937
John Gibson	Liberal/Independent	North Esk	1903–1906
George Gilmore	Liberal/Ministerial	Waratah	1893–1900; 1903–1906
Alexander Hean	Liberal/Ministerial	Sorell	1903–1913; 1916–1925
Thomas Hodgman	Liberal/Ministerial	Monmouth	1900–1912
John Hope	Ministerial	Kentish	1900–1911
Jens Jensen	Labor	George Town	1903–1910; 1922–1925; 1928–1934
William Lamerton	Labor/Ind.Labor	Zeehan	1903–1906
James Long^{[4]}	Labor	Lyell	1903–1910
Carmichael Lyne	Liberal	Ringarooma	1900–1906
Sir John McCall	Liberal	West Devon	1888–1893; 1901–1909
Charles Mackenzie	Ministerial	Wellington	1886–1909
Henry Murray	Liberal	Latrobe	1891–1900; 1902–1909
Herbert Nicholls	Liberal	Central Hobart	1900–1909
Robert Patterson^{[5]}	Ministerial	South Hobart	1900–1904
Herbert Payne	Liberal	Burnie	1903–1920
William Propsting	Liberal	North Hobart	1899–1905
Frederick Rattle	Liberal/Ministerial	Glenorchy	1903–1912
Matthew Robinson^{[3]}	Liberal/Independent	West Launceston	1903–1906
Robert Sadler	Liberal	Central Launceston	1900–1912; 1913–1922
David Storrer^{[3]}	Liberal	West Launceston	1902–1903
Charles Stewart	Liberal/Ministerial	East Launceston	1903–1909
John Wood^{[2]}	Ministerial	Cumberland	1903–1909
Alfred Youl^{[1]}	Ministerial	Longford	1903–1909

== Notes ==
^{1} On 12 May 1903, the Ministerial member for Longford, Henry Dumaresq, resigned. Ministerial candidate Alfred Youl was elected unopposed.
^{2} On 22 September 1903, the Ministerial member for Cumberland and Speaker of the House, Nicholas John Brown, died. Ministerial candidate John Wood won the resulting by-election on 9 October 1903.
^{3} In November 1903, the Liberal member for West Launceston, David Storrer, resigned to contest the Federal seat of Bass against William Hartnoll, who Storrer had replaced in the Assembly the previous year. Liberal candidate Matthew Robinson won the resulting by-election on 10 December 1903.
^{4} In July 1904, the Labor member for Lyell, James Long, resigned. He was returned unopposed on 13 July 1904.
^{5} In July 1904, the Ministerial member for South Hobart, Robert Patterson, resigned. Ministerial candidate Stafford Bird won the resulting by-election on 30 July 1904.

== Sources ==
- Hughes, Colin A.; Graham, B. D. (1976). Voting for the South Australian, Western Australian and Tasmanian Lower Houses, 1890-1964. Canberra: Australian National University. ISBN 0-7081-1334-6.
- Parliament of Tasmania (2006). The Parliament of Tasmania from 1856
