= Members of the Tasmanian House of Assembly =

Following are lists of members of the Tasmanian House of Assembly:

- 1856–1861
- 1861–1862
- 1862–1866
- 1866–1871
- 1871–1872
- 1872–1877
- 1877–1882
- 1882–1886
- 1886–1891
- 1891–1893
- 1893–1897
- 1897–1900
- 1900–1903
- 1903–1906
- 1906–1909
- 1909–1912
- 1912–1913
- 1913–1916
- 1916–1919
- 1919–1922
- 1922–1925
- 1925–1928
- 1928–1931
- 1931–1934
- 1934–1937
- 1937–1941
- 1941–1946
- 1946–1948
- 1948–1950
- 1950–1955
- 1955–1956
- 1956–1959
- 1959–1964
- 1964–1969
- 1969–1972
- 1972–1976
- 1976–1979
- 1979–1982
- 1982–1986
- 1986–1989
- 1989–1992
- 1992–1996
- 1996–1998
- 1998–2002
- 2002–2006
- 2006–2010
- 2010–2014
- 2014–2018
- 2018–2021
- 2021–2024
- 2024–2025
- 2025–2029
