= Bromby =

Bromby is a surname. Notable people with the surname include:

- Charles Bromby (1814–1907), Anglican bishop of Tasmania
- Charles Hamilton Bromby (1843–1904), Attorney-General of Tasmania, son of the bishop
- Henry Bromby (1840–1911), Dean of Hobart, son of the bishop
- John Edward Bromby (1809–1889), Australian schoolmaster, brother of the bishop
- Leigh Bromby (born 1980), English footballer
- Oliver Bromby (born 1998), English sprinter
- Peter Bromby (born 1964), Bermudian sailor

== See also ==
- Brøndby Municipality
