= William Burbury =

Australian politician

Member of the Tasmanian House of Assembly for Oatlands
- In office 19 May 1899 – 2 April 1903
- Preceded by: Alfred Pillinger
- Succeeded by: Seat abolished

Personal details
- Born: William Burbury; 11 February 1836 Oatlands, Van Diemen's Land
- Died: 20 November 1905 (aged 69) Hobart, Tasmania

William Burbury (11 February 1836 – 20 November 1905) was an Australian politician.

Burbury was born in Oatlands, Van Diemen's Land. In 1899 he was elected to the Tasmanian House of Assembly, representing the seat of Oatlands. He served until his seat was abolished in 1903. He died in 1905 in Hobart.

Tasmanian House of Assembly
Preceded by Alfred Pillinger	Member for Oatlands; 1899–1903	Seat abolished
