= George Hiddlestone =

Australian politician

Member of the Tasmanian House of Assembly for West Hobart
- In office 22 May 1891 – January 1897 Serving with Edward Mulcahy
- Preceded by: William Burgess/George Fitzgerald
- Succeeded by: Seat abolished

Personal details
- Born: 30 December 1834 West Tarring, Sussex
- Died: 23 June 1912 (aged 77) Hobart, Tasmania

George Hiddlestone (30 December 1834 – 23 June 1912) was an Australian politician.

Hiddlestone was born in West Tarring in Sussex in 1834. In 1891 he was elected to the Tasmanian House of Assembly, representing the seat of West Hobart. He served until he was defeated contesting Hobart in 1897. He died in 1912 in Hobart.

Tasmanian House of Assembly
Preceded by William Burgess; George Fitzgerald	Member for West Hobart; 1891–1897; Served alongside: Edward Mulcahy	Abolished
