= Premier of Tasmania =

Head of government of Tasmania

- Tasmanian coat of arms

- Flag of Tasmania

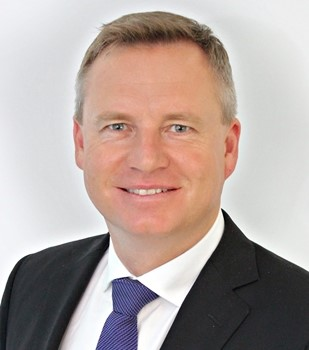
- Incumbent; Jeremy Rockliff since 8 April 2022
- Department of Premier and Cabinet
- Style: The Honourable (formal); Premier (informal)
- Status: Head of government
- Member of: Parliament; National Cabinet; Cabinet; Executive Council
- Reports to: Parliament
- Seat: Executive Building; 15 Murray Street, Hobart
- Appointer: Governor of Tasmania; by convention, based on appointee's ability to command confidence in the House of Assembly
- Term length: At the governor's pleasure; contingent on the premier's ability to command confidence in the lower house of Parliament
- Constituting instrument: None (constitutional convention)
- Formation: 1 November 1856
- First holder: William Champ
- Deputy: Deputy Premier of Tasmania
- Salary: A$301,397
- Website: www.premier.tas.gov.au

The premier of Tasmania is the head of government of the Australian state of Tasmania. The premier is the leader of the cabinet of Tasmania, and nominates its ministers for appointment by the governor. The premier is appointed by the governor based on the premier's ability to command confidence within the House of Assembly. To this end, the governor usually appoints the leader of the party or coalition that controls a majority of seats in the House of Assembly. However, due to Tasmania's electoral system and tendency to elect minority governments, the governor can appoint a premier on the expectation that confidence is tested in parliament.

Since 8 April 2022, the premier of Tasmania has been Jeremy Rockliff, leader of the Liberal Party, which holds 14 of the 35 seats in the House of Assembly. Due to Rockliff not holding a majority since 2023, he has had to negotiate with crossbenchers to form a government. Since the 2024 state election, he has been supported intermittently by the Jacqui Lambie Network, the Greens, the SFF and various independents, including David O'Byrne whom Rockliff offered a ministerial position to. The current cabinet Rockliff leads is the third Rockliff ministry.

The premier of Tasmania is the lowest-paid Australian premier, and the second-lowest paid head of government nationwide. Incumbent premier Jeremy Rockliff turned down a 22% pay rise in 2025.

== List of premiers of Tasmania ==
Formal political parties did not emerge in Tasmania until the 1900s. In the late 19th century, the House of Assembly divided into two broad groupings: a conservative bloc associated with the "old established families of the island", led by Elliott Lewis and Henry Dobson, and a liberal bloc (with radical elements) led by Philip Fysh and Edward Braddon.

The current convention of appointing the premier from the House of Assembly did not develop until the late 19th century, with eight premiers appointed from the Legislative Council (the last being Philip Fysh from 1887 to 1892).

No.	Portrait	Name Electoral division (Birth–death)	Election	Term of office			Political party	Monarch
No.	Portrait	Name Electoral division (Birth–death)	Election	Term start	Term end	Time in office	Political party	Monarch
1		William Champ; MHA for Launceston (1808–1892)	1856	1 November 1856	26 February 1857	117 days	Independent	Victoria (1837–1901); Governor: Sir Henry Young (1855–1861); Sir Thomas Browne (1862–1868); Sir Charles Du Cane (1869–1874); Sir Frederick Weld (1875–1880); Sir John Henry Lefroy (1880–1881); Sir George Strahan (1881–1886); Sir Robert Hamilton (1887–1892); The Viscount Gormanston (1893–1900)
2		Thomas Gregson; MHA for Richmond (1796–1874)	—	26 February 1857	25 April 1857	58 days	Independent	Victoria (1837–1901); Governor: Sir Henry Young (1855–1861); Sir Thomas Browne (1862–1868); Sir Charles Du Cane (1869–1874); Sir Frederick Weld (1875–1880); Sir John Henry Lefroy (1880–1881); Sir George Strahan (1881–1886); Sir Robert Hamilton (1887–1892); The Viscount Gormanston (1893–1900)
3		William Weston; MHA for Ringwood (1804–1888)	—	25 April 1857	12 May 1857	17 days	Independent	Victoria (1837–1901); Governor: Sir Henry Young (1855–1861); Sir Thomas Browne (1862–1868); Sir Charles Du Cane (1869–1874); Sir Frederick Weld (1875–1880); Sir John Henry Lefroy (1880–1881); Sir George Strahan (1881–1886); Sir Robert Hamilton (1887–1892); The Viscount Gormanston (1893–1900)
4		Francis Smith; MHA for Fingal (1819–1909)	—	12 May 1857	1 November 1860	3 years, 173 days	Independent	Victoria (1837–1901); Governor: Sir Henry Young (1855–1861); Sir Thomas Browne (1862–1868); Sir Charles Du Cane (1869–1874); Sir Frederick Weld (1875–1880); Sir John Henry Lefroy (1880–1881); Sir George Strahan (1881–1886); Sir Robert Hamilton (1887–1892); The Viscount Gormanston (1893–1900)
(3)		William Weston; MLC for Longford (1804–1888)	—	1 November 1860	2 August 1861	274 days	Independent	Victoria (1837–1901); Governor: Sir Henry Young (1855–1861); Sir Thomas Browne (1862–1868); Sir Charles Du Cane (1869–1874); Sir Frederick Weld (1875–1880); Sir John Henry Lefroy (1880–1881); Sir George Strahan (1881–1886); Sir Robert Hamilton (1887–1892); The Viscount Gormanston (1893–1900)
5		Thomas Chapman; MHA for Queensborough (until 1862); MHA for Campbell Town (from 1862) (1815–1884)	1861	2 August 1861	20 January 1863	1 year, 171 days	Independent	Victoria (1837–1901); Governor: Sir Henry Young (1855–1861); Sir Thomas Browne (1862–1868); Sir Charles Du Cane (1869–1874); Sir Frederick Weld (1875–1880); Sir John Henry Lefroy (1880–1881); Sir George Strahan (1881–1886); Sir Robert Hamilton (1887–1892); The Viscount Gormanston (1893–1900)
6		James Whyte; MLC for Pembroke (1820–1882)	1862	20 January 1863	24 November 1866	3 years, 308 days	Independent	Victoria (1837–1901); Governor: Sir Henry Young (1855–1861); Sir Thomas Browne (1862–1868); Sir Charles Du Cane (1869–1874); Sir Frederick Weld (1875–1880); Sir John Henry Lefroy (1880–1881); Sir George Strahan (1881–1886); Sir Robert Hamilton (1887–1892); The Viscount Gormanston (1893–1900)
7		Sir Richard Dry; MLC for Tamar (1815–1869)	1866	24 November 1866	1 August 1869 (†)	2 years, 250 days	Independent	Victoria (1837–1901); Governor: Sir Henry Young (1855–1861); Sir Thomas Browne (1862–1868); Sir Charles Du Cane (1869–1874); Sir Frederick Weld (1875–1880); Sir John Henry Lefroy (1880–1881); Sir George Strahan (1881–1886); Sir Robert Hamilton (1887–1892); The Viscount Gormanston (1893–1900)
8		James Milne Wilson; MLC for Hobart (1812–1880)	—	4 August 1869	4 November 1872	3 years, 92 days	Independent	Victoria (1837–1901); Governor: Sir Henry Young (1855–1861); Sir Thomas Browne (1862–1868); Sir Charles Du Cane (1869–1874); Sir Frederick Weld (1875–1880); Sir John Henry Lefroy (1880–1881); Sir George Strahan (1881–1886); Sir Robert Hamilton (1887–1892); The Viscount Gormanston (1893–1900)
8		James Milne Wilson; MLC for Hobart (1812–1880)	1871	4 August 1869	4 November 1872	3 years, 92 days	Independent	Victoria (1837–1901); Governor: Sir Henry Young (1855–1861); Sir Thomas Browne (1862–1868); Sir Charles Du Cane (1869–1874); Sir Frederick Weld (1875–1880); Sir John Henry Lefroy (1880–1881); Sir George Strahan (1881–1886); Sir Robert Hamilton (1887–1892); The Viscount Gormanston (1893–1900)
9		Frederick Innes; MHA for Selby (1816–1882)	1872	4 November 1872	4 August 1873	273 days	Independent	Victoria (1837–1901); Governor: Sir Henry Young (1855–1861); Sir Thomas Browne (1862–1868); Sir Charles Du Cane (1869–1874); Sir Frederick Weld (1875–1880); Sir John Henry Lefroy (1880–1881); Sir George Strahan (1881–1886); Sir Robert Hamilton (1887–1892); The Viscount Gormanston (1893–1900)
10		Alfred Kennerley; MLC for Hobart (1810–1897)	—	4 August 1873	20 July 1876	2 years, 351 days	Independent	Victoria (1837–1901); Governor: Sir Henry Young (1855–1861); Sir Thomas Browne (1862–1868); Sir Charles Du Cane (1869–1874); Sir Frederick Weld (1875–1880); Sir John Henry Lefroy (1880–1881); Sir George Strahan (1881–1886); Sir Robert Hamilton (1887–1892); The Viscount Gormanston (1893–1900)
11		Thomas Reibey; MHA for Westbury (1821–1912)	—	20 July 1876	9 August 1877	1 year, 20 days	Independent	Victoria (1837–1901); Governor: Sir Henry Young (1855–1861); Sir Thomas Browne (1862–1868); Sir Charles Du Cane (1869–1874); Sir Frederick Weld (1875–1880); Sir John Henry Lefroy (1880–1881); Sir George Strahan (1881–1886); Sir Robert Hamilton (1887–1892); The Viscount Gormanston (1893–1900)
12		Philip Fysh; MHA for East Hobart (1835–1919)	1877	9 August 1877	5 March 1878	208 days	Independent	Victoria (1837–1901); Governor: Sir Henry Young (1855–1861); Sir Thomas Browne (1862–1868); Sir Charles Du Cane (1869–1874); Sir Frederick Weld (1875–1880); Sir John Henry Lefroy (1880–1881); Sir George Strahan (1881–1886); Sir Robert Hamilton (1887–1892); The Viscount Gormanston (1893–1900)
13		William Giblin; MHA for Wellington (1840–1887)	—	5 March 1878	20 December 1878	290 days	Independent	Victoria (1837–1901); Governor: Sir Henry Young (1855–1861); Sir Thomas Browne (1862–1868); Sir Charles Du Cane (1869–1874); Sir Frederick Weld (1875–1880); Sir John Henry Lefroy (1880–1881); Sir George Strahan (1881–1886); Sir Robert Hamilton (1887–1892); The Viscount Gormanston (1893–1900)
14		William Crowther; MHA for Queensborough (1817–1885)	—	20 December 1878	30 October 1879	314 days	Independent	Victoria (1837–1901); Governor: Sir Henry Young (1855–1861); Sir Thomas Browne (1862–1868); Sir Charles Du Cane (1869–1874); Sir Frederick Weld (1875–1880); Sir John Henry Lefroy (1880–1881); Sir George Strahan (1881–1886); Sir Robert Hamilton (1887–1892); The Viscount Gormanston (1893–1900)
(13)		William Giblin; MHA for Wellington (1840–1887)	—	30 October 1879	15 August 1884	4 years, 290 days	Independent	Victoria (1837–1901); Governor: Sir Henry Young (1855–1861); Sir Thomas Browne (1862–1868); Sir Charles Du Cane (1869–1874); Sir Frederick Weld (1875–1880); Sir John Henry Lefroy (1880–1881); Sir George Strahan (1881–1886); Sir Robert Hamilton (1887–1892); The Viscount Gormanston (1893–1900)
(13)		William Giblin; MHA for Wellington (1840–1887)	1882	30 October 1879	15 August 1884	4 years, 290 days	Independent	Victoria (1837–1901); Governor: Sir Henry Young (1855–1861); Sir Thomas Browne (1862–1868); Sir Charles Du Cane (1869–1874); Sir Frederick Weld (1875–1880); Sir John Henry Lefroy (1880–1881); Sir George Strahan (1881–1886); Sir Robert Hamilton (1887–1892); The Viscount Gormanston (1893–1900)
15		Adye Douglas; MLC for South Esk (1815–1906)	—	15 August 1884	8 March 1886	1 year, 205 days	Independent	Victoria (1837–1901); Governor: Sir Henry Young (1855–1861); Sir Thomas Browne (1862–1868); Sir Charles Du Cane (1869–1874); Sir Frederick Weld (1875–1880); Sir John Henry Lefroy (1880–1881); Sir George Strahan (1881–1886); Sir Robert Hamilton (1887–1892); The Viscount Gormanston (1893–1900)
16		James Agnew; MLC for Macquarie (1815–1901)	—	8 March 1886	29 March 1887	1 year, 21 days	Independent	Victoria (1837–1901); Governor: Sir Henry Young (1855–1861); Sir Thomas Browne (1862–1868); Sir Charles Du Cane (1869–1874); Sir Frederick Weld (1875–1880); Sir John Henry Lefroy (1880–1881); Sir George Strahan (1881–1886); Sir Robert Hamilton (1887–1892); The Viscount Gormanston (1893–1900)
16		James Agnew; MLC for Macquarie (1815–1901)	1886	8 March 1886	29 March 1887	1 year, 21 days	Independent	Victoria (1837–1901); Governor: Sir Henry Young (1855–1861); Sir Thomas Browne (1862–1868); Sir Charles Du Cane (1869–1874); Sir Frederick Weld (1875–1880); Sir John Henry Lefroy (1880–1881); Sir George Strahan (1881–1886); Sir Robert Hamilton (1887–1892); The Viscount Gormanston (1893–1900)
(12)		Philip Fysh; MLC for Buckingham (1835–1919)	—	29 March 1887	27 August 1892	5 years, 141 days	Liberal	Victoria (1837–1901); Governor: Sir Henry Young (1855–1861); Sir Thomas Browne (1862–1868); Sir Charles Du Cane (1869–1874); Sir Frederick Weld (1875–1880); Sir John Henry Lefroy (1880–1881); Sir George Strahan (1881–1886); Sir Robert Hamilton (1887–1892); The Viscount Gormanston (1893–1900)
(12)		Philip Fysh; MLC for Buckingham (1835–1919)	1891	29 March 1887	27 August 1892	5 years, 141 days	Liberal	Victoria (1837–1901); Governor: Sir Henry Young (1855–1861); Sir Thomas Browne (1862–1868); Sir Charles Du Cane (1869–1874); Sir Frederick Weld (1875–1880); Sir John Henry Lefroy (1880–1881); Sir George Strahan (1881–1886); Sir Robert Hamilton (1887–1892); The Viscount Gormanston (1893–1900)
17		Henry Dobson; MHA for Brighton (1841–1918)	—	27 August 1892	14 April 1894	1 year, 240 days	Conservative	Victoria (1837–1901); Governor: Sir Henry Young (1855–1861); Sir Thomas Browne (1862–1868); Sir Charles Du Cane (1869–1874); Sir Frederick Weld (1875–1880); Sir John Henry Lefroy (1880–1881); Sir George Strahan (1881–1886); Sir Robert Hamilton (1887–1892); The Viscount Gormanston (1893–1900)
17		Henry Dobson; MHA for Brighton (1841–1918)	1893	27 August 1892	14 April 1894	1 year, 240 days	Conservative	Victoria (1837–1901); Governor: Sir Henry Young (1855–1861); Sir Thomas Browne (1862–1868); Sir Charles Du Cane (1869–1874); Sir Frederick Weld (1875–1880); Sir John Henry Lefroy (1880–1881); Sir George Strahan (1881–1886); Sir Robert Hamilton (1887–1892); The Viscount Gormanston (1893–1900)
18		Sir Edward Braddon; MHA for West Devon (1829–1904)	—	14 April 1894	12 October 1899	5 years, 181 days	Liberal	Victoria (1837–1901); Governor: Sir Henry Young (1855–1861); Sir Thomas Browne (1862–1868); Sir Charles Du Cane (1869–1874); Sir Frederick Weld (1875–1880); Sir John Henry Lefroy (1880–1881); Sir George Strahan (1881–1886); Sir Robert Hamilton (1887–1892); The Viscount Gormanston (1893–1900)
18		Sir Edward Braddon; MHA for West Devon (1829–1904)	1897	14 April 1894	12 October 1899	5 years, 181 days	Liberal	Victoria (1837–1901); Governor: Sir Henry Young (1855–1861); Sir Thomas Browne (1862–1868); Sir Charles Du Cane (1869–1874); Sir Frederick Weld (1875–1880); Sir John Henry Lefroy (1880–1881); Sir George Strahan (1881–1886); Sir Robert Hamilton (1887–1892); The Viscount Gormanston (1893–1900)
19		Sir Elliott Lewis; MHA for Richmond (1858–1935)	—	12 October 1899	9 April 1903	3 years, 179 days	Conservative	Victoria (1837–1901); Governor: Sir Henry Young (1855–1861); Sir Thomas Browne (1862–1868); Sir Charles Du Cane (1869–1874); Sir Frederick Weld (1875–1880); Sir John Henry Lefroy (1880–1881); Sir George Strahan (1881–1886); Sir Robert Hamilton (1887–1892); The Viscount Gormanston (1893–1900)
19		Sir Elliott Lewis; MHA for Richmond (1858–1935)	1900	12 October 1899	9 April 1903	3 years, 179 days	Conservative	Victoria (1837–1901); Governor: Sir Henry Young (1855–1861); Sir Thomas Browne (1862–1868); Sir Charles Du Cane (1869–1874); Sir Frederick Weld (1875–1880); Sir John Henry Lefroy (1880–1881); Sir George Strahan (1881–1886); Sir Robert Hamilton (1887–1892); The Viscount Gormanston (1893–1900)
19		Sir Elliott Lewis; MHA for Richmond (1858–1935)	1900	12 October 1899	9 April 1903	3 years, 179 days	Conservative	Edward VII (1901–1910); Governor: Sir Arthur Havelock (1901–1904); Sir Gerald Strickland (1904–1909); Sir Harry Barron (from 1909)
20		William Propsting; MHA for North Hobart (1861–1937)	1903	9 April 1903	12 July 1904	1 year, 94 days	Liberal Democrat	Edward VII (1901–1910); Governor: Sir Arthur Havelock (1901–1904); Sir Gerald Strickland (1904–1909); Sir Harry Barron (from 1909)
21		John Evans; MHA for Kingborough (until 1909); MHA for Franklin (from 1909) (1855–1943)	—	12 July 1904	19 June 1909	4 years, 342 days	Anti-Socialist	Edward VII (1901–1910); Governor: Sir Arthur Havelock (1901–1904); Sir Gerald Strickland (1904–1909); Sir Harry Barron (from 1909)
21		John Evans; MHA for Kingborough (until 1909); MHA for Franklin (from 1909) (1855–1943)	1906	12 July 1904	19 June 1909	4 years, 342 days	Anti-Socialist	Edward VII (1901–1910); Governor: Sir Arthur Havelock (1901–1904); Sir Gerald Strickland (1904–1909); Sir Harry Barron (from 1909)
21		John Evans; MHA for Kingborough (until 1909); MHA for Franklin (from 1909) (1855–1943)	1909	12 July 1904	19 June 1909	4 years, 342 days	Anti-Socialist	Edward VII (1901–1910); Governor: Sir Arthur Havelock (1901–1904); Sir Gerald Strickland (1904–1909); Sir Harry Barron (from 1909)
(19)		Sir Elliott Lewis; MHA for Denison (1858–1935)	—	19 June 1909	20 October 1909	123 days	Liberal League	Edward VII (1901–1910); Governor: Sir Arthur Havelock (1901–1904); Sir Gerald Strickland (1904–1909); Sir Harry Barron (from 1909)
22		John Earle; MHA for Franklin (1865–1932)	—	20 October 1909	27 October 1909	7 days	Labor	Edward VII (1901–1910); Governor: Sir Arthur Havelock (1901–1904); Sir Gerald Strickland (1904–1909); Sir Harry Barron (from 1909)
(19)		Sir Elliott Lewis; MHA for Denison (1858–1935)	—	27 October 1909	14 June 1912	2 years, 231 days	Liberal League	Edward VII (1901–1910); Governor: Sir Arthur Havelock (1901–1904); Sir Gerald Strickland (1904–1909); Sir Harry Barron (from 1909)
(19)		Sir Elliott Lewis; MHA for Denison (1858–1935)	—	27 October 1909	14 June 1912	2 years, 231 days	Liberal League	George V (1910–1936); Governor: Sir Harry Barron (until 1913); Sir William Ellison-Macartney (1913–1917); Sir Francis Newdegate (1917–1920); Sir William Allardyce (1920–1922); Sir James O'Grady (1924–1930); Sir Ernest Clark (from 1933)
(19)		Sir Elliott Lewis; MHA for Denison (1858–1935)	1912	27 October 1909	14 June 1912	2 years, 231 days	Liberal League	George V (1910–1936); Governor: Sir Harry Barron (until 1913); Sir William Ellison-Macartney (1913–1917); Sir Francis Newdegate (1917–1920); Sir William Allardyce (1920–1922); Sir James O'Grady (1924–1930); Sir Ernest Clark (from 1933)
23		Albert Solomon; MHA for Bass (1876–1914)	—	14 June 1912	6 April 1914	1 year, 296 days	Liberal League	George V (1910–1936); Governor: Sir Harry Barron (until 1913); Sir William Ellison-Macartney (1913–1917); Sir Francis Newdegate (1917–1920); Sir William Allardyce (1920–1922); Sir James O'Grady (1924–1930); Sir Ernest Clark (from 1933)
23		Albert Solomon; MHA for Bass (1876–1914)	1913	14 June 1912	6 April 1914	1 year, 296 days	Liberal League	George V (1910–1936); Governor: Sir Harry Barron (until 1913); Sir William Ellison-Macartney (1913–1917); Sir Francis Newdegate (1917–1920); Sir William Allardyce (1920–1922); Sir James O'Grady (1924–1930); Sir Ernest Clark (from 1933)
(22)		John Earle; MHA for Franklin (1865–1932)	—	6 April 1914	15 April 1916	2 years, 9 days	Labor	George V (1910–1936); Governor: Sir Harry Barron (until 1913); Sir William Ellison-Macartney (1913–1917); Sir Francis Newdegate (1917–1920); Sir William Allardyce (1920–1922); Sir James O'Grady (1924–1930); Sir Ernest Clark (from 1933)
24		Sir Walter Lee; MHA for Wilmot (1874–1963)	1916	15 April 1916	12 August 1922	6 years, 119 days	Liberal League (until 1917)	George V (1910–1936); Governor: Sir Harry Barron (until 1913); Sir William Ellison-Macartney (1913–1917); Sir Francis Newdegate (1917–1920); Sir William Allardyce (1920–1922); Sir James O'Grady (1924–1930); Sir Ernest Clark (from 1933)
		Sir Walter Lee; MHA for Wilmot (1874–1963)	1916	15 April 1916	12 August 1922	6 years, 119 days	Nationalist	George V (1910–1936); Governor: Sir Harry Barron (until 1913); Sir William Ellison-Macartney (1913–1917); Sir Francis Newdegate (1917–1920); Sir William Allardyce (1920–1922); Sir James O'Grady (1924–1930); Sir Ernest Clark (from 1933)
		Sir Walter Lee; MHA for Wilmot (1874–1963)	1919	15 April 1916	12 August 1922	6 years, 119 days	Nationalist	George V (1910–1936); Governor: Sir Harry Barron (until 1913); Sir William Ellison-Macartney (1913–1917); Sir Francis Newdegate (1917–1920); Sir William Allardyce (1920–1922); Sir James O'Grady (1924–1930); Sir Ernest Clark (from 1933)
		Sir Walter Lee; MHA for Wilmot (1874–1963)	1922	15 April 1916	12 August 1922	6 years, 119 days	Nationalist	George V (1910–1936); Governor: Sir Harry Barron (until 1913); Sir William Ellison-Macartney (1913–1917); Sir Francis Newdegate (1917–1920); Sir William Allardyce (1920–1922); Sir James O'Grady (1924–1930); Sir Ernest Clark (from 1933)
25		John Hayes; MHA for Bass (1868–1956)	—	12 August 1922	14 August 1923	1 year, 2 days	Nationalist	George V (1910–1936); Governor: Sir Harry Barron (until 1913); Sir William Ellison-Macartney (1913–1917); Sir Francis Newdegate (1917–1920); Sir William Allardyce (1920–1922); Sir James O'Grady (1924–1930); Sir Ernest Clark (from 1933)
(24)		Sir Walter Lee; MHA for Wilmot (1874–1963)	—	14 August 1923	25 October 1923	1 year, 72 days	Nationalist	George V (1910–1936); Governor: Sir Harry Barron (until 1913); Sir William Ellison-Macartney (1913–1917); Sir Francis Newdegate (1917–1920); Sir William Allardyce (1920–1922); Sir James O'Grady (1924–1930); Sir Ernest Clark (from 1933)
26		Joseph Lyons; MHA for Wilmot (1879–1939)	—	25 October 1923	15 June 1928	4 years, 234 days	Labor	George V (1910–1936); Governor: Sir Harry Barron (until 1913); Sir William Ellison-Macartney (1913–1917); Sir Francis Newdegate (1917–1920); Sir William Allardyce (1920–1922); Sir James O'Grady (1924–1930); Sir Ernest Clark (from 1933)
26		Joseph Lyons; MHA for Wilmot (1879–1939)	1925	25 October 1923	15 June 1928	4 years, 234 days	Labor	George V (1910–1936); Governor: Sir Harry Barron (until 1913); Sir William Ellison-Macartney (1913–1917); Sir Francis Newdegate (1917–1920); Sir William Allardyce (1920–1922); Sir James O'Grady (1924–1930); Sir Ernest Clark (from 1933)
27		John McPhee; MHA for Denison (1878–1952)	1928	15 June 1928	15 March 1934	5 years, 273 days	Nationalist	George V (1910–1936); Governor: Sir Harry Barron (until 1913); Sir William Ellison-Macartney (1913–1917); Sir Francis Newdegate (1917–1920); Sir William Allardyce (1920–1922); Sir James O'Grady (1924–1930); Sir Ernest Clark (from 1933)
27		John McPhee; MHA for Denison (1878–1952)	1931	15 June 1928	15 March 1934	5 years, 273 days	Nationalist	George V (1910–1936); Governor: Sir Harry Barron (until 1913); Sir William Ellison-Macartney (1913–1917); Sir Francis Newdegate (1917–1920); Sir William Allardyce (1920–1922); Sir James O'Grady (1924–1930); Sir Ernest Clark (from 1933)
(24)		Sir Walter Lee; MHA for Wilmot (1874–1963)	—	15 March 1934	22 June 1934	99 days	Nationalist	George V (1910–1936); Governor: Sir Harry Barron (until 1913); Sir William Ellison-Macartney (1913–1917); Sir Francis Newdegate (1917–1920); Sir William Allardyce (1920–1922); Sir James O'Grady (1924–1930); Sir Ernest Clark (from 1933)
28		Albert Ogilvie; MHA for Franklin (1890–1939)	1934	22 June 1934	10 June 1939 (†)	4 years, 353 days	Labor	George V (1910–1936); Governor: Sir Harry Barron (until 1913); Sir William Ellison-Macartney (1913–1917); Sir Francis Newdegate (1917–1920); Sir William Allardyce (1920–1922); Sir James O'Grady (1924–1930); Sir Ernest Clark (from 1933)
28		Albert Ogilvie; MHA for Franklin (1890–1939)	1934	22 June 1934	10 June 1939 (†)	4 years, 353 days	Labor	Edward VIII (1936); Governor: Sir Ernest Clark
28		Albert Ogilvie; MHA for Franklin (1890–1939)	1934	22 June 1934	10 June 1939 (†)	4 years, 353 days	Labor	George VI (1936–1952); Governor: Sir Ernest Clark (until 1945); Sir Hugh Binney (1945–1951); Sir Ronald Cross (from 1951)
28		Albert Ogilvie; MHA for Franklin (1890–1939)	1937	22 June 1934	10 June 1939 (†)	4 years, 353 days	Labor	George VI (1936–1952); Governor: Sir Ernest Clark (until 1945); Sir Hugh Binney (1945–1951); Sir Ronald Cross (from 1951)
29		Edmund Dwyer-Gray; MHA for Denison (1870–1945)	—	11 June 1939	18 December 1939	190 days	Labor	George VI (1936–1952); Governor: Sir Ernest Clark (until 1945); Sir Hugh Binney (1945–1951); Sir Ronald Cross (from 1951)
30		Robert Cosgrove; MHA for Denison (1884–1969)	—	18 December 1939	18 December 1947	8 years, 0 days	Labor	George VI (1936–1952); Governor: Sir Ernest Clark (until 1945); Sir Hugh Binney (1945–1951); Sir Ronald Cross (from 1951)
30		Robert Cosgrove; MHA for Denison (1884–1969)	1941	18 December 1939	18 December 1947	8 years, 0 days	Labor	George VI (1936–1952); Governor: Sir Ernest Clark (until 1945); Sir Hugh Binney (1945–1951); Sir Ronald Cross (from 1951)
30		Robert Cosgrove; MHA for Denison (1884–1969)	1946	18 December 1939	18 December 1947	8 years, 0 days	Labor	George VI (1936–1952); Governor: Sir Ernest Clark (until 1945); Sir Hugh Binney (1945–1951); Sir Ronald Cross (from 1951)
31		Edward Brooker; MHA for Franklin (1891–1948)	—	18 December 1947	25 February 1948	69 days	Labor	George VI (1936–1952); Governor: Sir Ernest Clark (until 1945); Sir Hugh Binney (1945–1951); Sir Ronald Cross (from 1951)
(30)		Robert Cosgrove; MHA for Denison (1884–1969)	—	25 February 1948	26 August 1958	10 years, 182 days	Labor	George VI (1936–1952); Governor: Sir Ernest Clark (until 1945); Sir Hugh Binney (1945–1951); Sir Ronald Cross (from 1951)
(30)		Robert Cosgrove; MHA for Denison (1884–1969)	1948	25 February 1948	26 August 1958	10 years, 182 days	Labor	George VI (1936–1952); Governor: Sir Ernest Clark (until 1945); Sir Hugh Binney (1945–1951); Sir Ronald Cross (from 1951)
(30)		Robert Cosgrove; MHA for Denison (1884–1969)	1950	25 February 1948	26 August 1958	10 years, 182 days	Labor	George VI (1936–1952); Governor: Sir Ernest Clark (until 1945); Sir Hugh Binney (1945–1951); Sir Ronald Cross (from 1951)
(30)		Robert Cosgrove; MHA for Denison (1884–1969)	1950	25 February 1948	26 August 1958	10 years, 182 days	Labor	Elizabeth II (1952–2022); Governor: Sir Ronald Cross (until 1958); The Lord Rowallan (1959–1963); Sir Charles Gairdner (1963–1968); Sir Edric Bastyan (1968–1973); Sir Stanley Burbury (1973–1982); Sir James Plimsoll (1982–1987); Sir Phillip Bennett (1987–1995); Sir Guy Green (1995–2003); Richard Butler (2003–2004); William Cox (2004–2008); Peter Underwood (2008–2014); Kate Warner (2014–2021); Barbara Baker (from 2021)
(30)		Robert Cosgrove; MHA for Denison (1884–1969)	1955	25 February 1948	26 August 1958	10 years, 182 days	Labor	Elizabeth II (1952–2022); Governor: Sir Ronald Cross (until 1958); The Lord Rowallan (1959–1963); Sir Charles Gairdner (1963–1968); Sir Edric Bastyan (1968–1973); Sir Stanley Burbury (1973–1982); Sir James Plimsoll (1982–1987); Sir Phillip Bennett (1987–1995); Sir Guy Green (1995–2003); Richard Butler (2003–2004); William Cox (2004–2008); Peter Underwood (2008–2014); Kate Warner (2014–2021); Barbara Baker (from 2021)
(30)		Robert Cosgrove; MHA for Denison (1884–1969)	1956	25 February 1948	26 August 1958	10 years, 182 days	Labor	Elizabeth II (1952–2022); Governor: Sir Ronald Cross (until 1958); The Lord Rowallan (1959–1963); Sir Charles Gairdner (1963–1968); Sir Edric Bastyan (1968–1973); Sir Stanley Burbury (1973–1982); Sir James Plimsoll (1982–1987); Sir Phillip Bennett (1987–1995); Sir Guy Green (1995–2003); Richard Butler (2003–2004); William Cox (2004–2008); Peter Underwood (2008–2014); Kate Warner (2014–2021); Barbara Baker (from 2021)
32		Eric Reece; MHA for Braddon (1909–1999)	—	26 August 1958	26 May 1969	10 years, 273 days	Labor	Elizabeth II (1952–2022); Governor: Sir Ronald Cross (until 1958); The Lord Rowallan (1959–1963); Sir Charles Gairdner (1963–1968); Sir Edric Bastyan (1968–1973); Sir Stanley Burbury (1973–1982); Sir James Plimsoll (1982–1987); Sir Phillip Bennett (1987–1995); Sir Guy Green (1995–2003); Richard Butler (2003–2004); William Cox (2004–2008); Peter Underwood (2008–2014); Kate Warner (2014–2021); Barbara Baker (from 2021)
32		Eric Reece; MHA for Braddon (1909–1999)	1959	26 August 1958	26 May 1969	10 years, 273 days	Labor	Elizabeth II (1952–2022); Governor: Sir Ronald Cross (until 1958); The Lord Rowallan (1959–1963); Sir Charles Gairdner (1963–1968); Sir Edric Bastyan (1968–1973); Sir Stanley Burbury (1973–1982); Sir James Plimsoll (1982–1987); Sir Phillip Bennett (1987–1995); Sir Guy Green (1995–2003); Richard Butler (2003–2004); William Cox (2004–2008); Peter Underwood (2008–2014); Kate Warner (2014–2021); Barbara Baker (from 2021)
32		Eric Reece; MHA for Braddon (1909–1999)	1964	26 August 1958	26 May 1969	10 years, 273 days	Labor	Elizabeth II (1952–2022); Governor: Sir Ronald Cross (until 1958); The Lord Rowallan (1959–1963); Sir Charles Gairdner (1963–1968); Sir Edric Bastyan (1968–1973); Sir Stanley Burbury (1973–1982); Sir James Plimsoll (1982–1987); Sir Phillip Bennett (1987–1995); Sir Guy Green (1995–2003); Richard Butler (2003–2004); William Cox (2004–2008); Peter Underwood (2008–2014); Kate Warner (2014–2021); Barbara Baker (from 2021)
33		Angus Bethune; MHA for Wilmot (1908–2004)	1969	26 May 1969	3 May 1972	2 years, 343 days	Liberal	Elizabeth II (1952–2022); Governor: Sir Ronald Cross (until 1958); The Lord Rowallan (1959–1963); Sir Charles Gairdner (1963–1968); Sir Edric Bastyan (1968–1973); Sir Stanley Burbury (1973–1982); Sir James Plimsoll (1982–1987); Sir Phillip Bennett (1987–1995); Sir Guy Green (1995–2003); Richard Butler (2003–2004); William Cox (2004–2008); Peter Underwood (2008–2014); Kate Warner (2014–2021); Barbara Baker (from 2021)
(32)		Eric Reece; MHA for Braddon (1909–1999)	1972	3 May 1972	31 March 1975	2 years, 332 days	Labor	Elizabeth II (1952–2022); Governor: Sir Ronald Cross (until 1958); The Lord Rowallan (1959–1963); Sir Charles Gairdner (1963–1968); Sir Edric Bastyan (1968–1973); Sir Stanley Burbury (1973–1982); Sir James Plimsoll (1982–1987); Sir Phillip Bennett (1987–1995); Sir Guy Green (1995–2003); Richard Butler (2003–2004); William Cox (2004–2008); Peter Underwood (2008–2014); Kate Warner (2014–2021); Barbara Baker (from 2021)
34		Bill Neilson; MHA for Franklin (1925–1989)	—	31 March 1975	1 December 1977	2 years, 245 days	Labor	Elizabeth II (1952–2022); Governor: Sir Ronald Cross (until 1958); The Lord Rowallan (1959–1963); Sir Charles Gairdner (1963–1968); Sir Edric Bastyan (1968–1973); Sir Stanley Burbury (1973–1982); Sir James Plimsoll (1982–1987); Sir Phillip Bennett (1987–1995); Sir Guy Green (1995–2003); Richard Butler (2003–2004); William Cox (2004–2008); Peter Underwood (2008–2014); Kate Warner (2014–2021); Barbara Baker (from 2021)
34		Bill Neilson; MHA for Franklin (1925–1989)	1976	31 March 1975	1 December 1977	2 years, 245 days	Labor	Elizabeth II (1952–2022); Governor: Sir Ronald Cross (until 1958); The Lord Rowallan (1959–1963); Sir Charles Gairdner (1963–1968); Sir Edric Bastyan (1968–1973); Sir Stanley Burbury (1973–1982); Sir James Plimsoll (1982–1987); Sir Phillip Bennett (1987–1995); Sir Guy Green (1995–2003); Richard Butler (2003–2004); William Cox (2004–2008); Peter Underwood (2008–2014); Kate Warner (2014–2021); Barbara Baker (from 2021)
35		Doug Lowe; MHA for Franklin (born 1942)	—	1 December 1977	11 November 1981	3 years, 345 days	Labor	Elizabeth II (1952–2022); Governor: Sir Ronald Cross (until 1958); The Lord Rowallan (1959–1963); Sir Charles Gairdner (1963–1968); Sir Edric Bastyan (1968–1973); Sir Stanley Burbury (1973–1982); Sir James Plimsoll (1982–1987); Sir Phillip Bennett (1987–1995); Sir Guy Green (1995–2003); Richard Butler (2003–2004); William Cox (2004–2008); Peter Underwood (2008–2014); Kate Warner (2014–2021); Barbara Baker (from 2021)
35		Doug Lowe; MHA for Franklin (born 1942)	1979	1 December 1977	11 November 1981	3 years, 345 days	Labor	Elizabeth II (1952–2022); Governor: Sir Ronald Cross (until 1958); The Lord Rowallan (1959–1963); Sir Charles Gairdner (1963–1968); Sir Edric Bastyan (1968–1973); Sir Stanley Burbury (1973–1982); Sir James Plimsoll (1982–1987); Sir Phillip Bennett (1987–1995); Sir Guy Green (1995–2003); Richard Butler (2003–2004); William Cox (2004–2008); Peter Underwood (2008–2014); Kate Warner (2014–2021); Barbara Baker (from 2021)
36		Harry Holgate; MHA for Bass (1933–1997)		11 November 1981	26 May 1982	196 days	Labor	Elizabeth II (1952–2022); Governor: Sir Ronald Cross (until 1958); The Lord Rowallan (1959–1963); Sir Charles Gairdner (1963–1968); Sir Edric Bastyan (1968–1973); Sir Stanley Burbury (1973–1982); Sir James Plimsoll (1982–1987); Sir Phillip Bennett (1987–1995); Sir Guy Green (1995–2003); Richard Butler (2003–2004); William Cox (2004–2008); Peter Underwood (2008–2014); Kate Warner (2014–2021); Barbara Baker (from 2021)
37		Robin Gray; MHA for Wilmot (until 1984); MHA for Lyons (from 1984) (born 1940)	1982	26 May 1982	29 June 1989	7 years, 34 days	Liberal	Elizabeth II (1952–2022); Governor: Sir Ronald Cross (until 1958); The Lord Rowallan (1959–1963); Sir Charles Gairdner (1963–1968); Sir Edric Bastyan (1968–1973); Sir Stanley Burbury (1973–1982); Sir James Plimsoll (1982–1987); Sir Phillip Bennett (1987–1995); Sir Guy Green (1995–2003); Richard Butler (2003–2004); William Cox (2004–2008); Peter Underwood (2008–2014); Kate Warner (2014–2021); Barbara Baker (from 2021)
37		Robin Gray; MHA for Wilmot (until 1984); MHA for Lyons (from 1984) (born 1940)	1986	26 May 1982	29 June 1989	7 years, 34 days	Liberal	Elizabeth II (1952–2022); Governor: Sir Ronald Cross (until 1958); The Lord Rowallan (1959–1963); Sir Charles Gairdner (1963–1968); Sir Edric Bastyan (1968–1973); Sir Stanley Burbury (1973–1982); Sir James Plimsoll (1982–1987); Sir Phillip Bennett (1987–1995); Sir Guy Green (1995–2003); Richard Butler (2003–2004); William Cox (2004–2008); Peter Underwood (2008–2014); Kate Warner (2014–2021); Barbara Baker (from 2021)
38		Michael Field; MHA for Braddon (born 1948)	1989	29 June 1989	17 February 1992	2 years, 233 days	Labor	Elizabeth II (1952–2022); Governor: Sir Ronald Cross (until 1958); The Lord Rowallan (1959–1963); Sir Charles Gairdner (1963–1968); Sir Edric Bastyan (1968–1973); Sir Stanley Burbury (1973–1982); Sir James Plimsoll (1982–1987); Sir Phillip Bennett (1987–1995); Sir Guy Green (1995–2003); Richard Butler (2003–2004); William Cox (2004–2008); Peter Underwood (2008–2014); Kate Warner (2014–2021); Barbara Baker (from 2021)
39		Ray Groom; MHA for Denison (born 1944)	1992	17 February 1992	18 March 1996	4 years, 30 days	Liberal	Elizabeth II (1952–2022); Governor: Sir Ronald Cross (until 1958); The Lord Rowallan (1959–1963); Sir Charles Gairdner (1963–1968); Sir Edric Bastyan (1968–1973); Sir Stanley Burbury (1973–1982); Sir James Plimsoll (1982–1987); Sir Phillip Bennett (1987–1995); Sir Guy Green (1995–2003); Richard Butler (2003–2004); William Cox (2004–2008); Peter Underwood (2008–2014); Kate Warner (2014–2021); Barbara Baker (from 2021)
39		Ray Groom; MHA for Denison (born 1944)	1996	17 February 1992	18 March 1996	4 years, 30 days	Liberal	Elizabeth II (1952–2022); Governor: Sir Ronald Cross (until 1958); The Lord Rowallan (1959–1963); Sir Charles Gairdner (1963–1968); Sir Edric Bastyan (1968–1973); Sir Stanley Burbury (1973–1982); Sir James Plimsoll (1982–1987); Sir Phillip Bennett (1987–1995); Sir Guy Green (1995–2003); Richard Butler (2003–2004); William Cox (2004–2008); Peter Underwood (2008–2014); Kate Warner (2014–2021); Barbara Baker (from 2021)
40		Tony Rundle; MHA for Braddon (1939–2025)	—	18 March 1996	14 September 1998	2 years, 180 days	Liberal	Elizabeth II (1952–2022); Governor: Sir Ronald Cross (until 1958); The Lord Rowallan (1959–1963); Sir Charles Gairdner (1963–1968); Sir Edric Bastyan (1968–1973); Sir Stanley Burbury (1973–1982); Sir James Plimsoll (1982–1987); Sir Phillip Bennett (1987–1995); Sir Guy Green (1995–2003); Richard Butler (2003–2004); William Cox (2004–2008); Peter Underwood (2008–2014); Kate Warner (2014–2021); Barbara Baker (from 2021)
41		Jim Bacon; MHA for Denison (1950–2004)	1998	14 September 1998	21 March 2004	5 years, 189 days	Labor	Elizabeth II (1952–2022); Governor: Sir Ronald Cross (until 1958); The Lord Rowallan (1959–1963); Sir Charles Gairdner (1963–1968); Sir Edric Bastyan (1968–1973); Sir Stanley Burbury (1973–1982); Sir James Plimsoll (1982–1987); Sir Phillip Bennett (1987–1995); Sir Guy Green (1995–2003); Richard Butler (2003–2004); William Cox (2004–2008); Peter Underwood (2008–2014); Kate Warner (2014–2021); Barbara Baker (from 2021)
41		Jim Bacon; MHA for Denison (1950–2004)	2002	14 September 1998	21 March 2004	5 years, 189 days	Labor	Elizabeth II (1952–2022); Governor: Sir Ronald Cross (until 1958); The Lord Rowallan (1959–1963); Sir Charles Gairdner (1963–1968); Sir Edric Bastyan (1968–1973); Sir Stanley Burbury (1973–1982); Sir James Plimsoll (1982–1987); Sir Phillip Bennett (1987–1995); Sir Guy Green (1995–2003); Richard Butler (2003–2004); William Cox (2004–2008); Peter Underwood (2008–2014); Kate Warner (2014–2021); Barbara Baker (from 2021)
42		Paul Lennon; MHA for Franklin (born 1955)	—	21 March 2004	26 May 2008	4 years, 66 days	Labor	Elizabeth II (1952–2022); Governor: Sir Ronald Cross (until 1958); The Lord Rowallan (1959–1963); Sir Charles Gairdner (1963–1968); Sir Edric Bastyan (1968–1973); Sir Stanley Burbury (1973–1982); Sir James Plimsoll (1982–1987); Sir Phillip Bennett (1987–1995); Sir Guy Green (1995–2003); Richard Butler (2003–2004); William Cox (2004–2008); Peter Underwood (2008–2014); Kate Warner (2014–2021); Barbara Baker (from 2021)
42		Paul Lennon; MHA for Franklin (born 1955)	2006	21 March 2004	26 May 2008	4 years, 66 days	Labor	Elizabeth II (1952–2022); Governor: Sir Ronald Cross (until 1958); The Lord Rowallan (1959–1963); Sir Charles Gairdner (1963–1968); Sir Edric Bastyan (1968–1973); Sir Stanley Burbury (1973–1982); Sir James Plimsoll (1982–1987); Sir Phillip Bennett (1987–1995); Sir Guy Green (1995–2003); Richard Butler (2003–2004); William Cox (2004–2008); Peter Underwood (2008–2014); Kate Warner (2014–2021); Barbara Baker (from 2021)
43		David Bartlett; MHA for Denison (born 1968)	—	26 May 2008	24 January 2011	2 years, 243 days	Labor	Elizabeth II (1952–2022); Governor: Sir Ronald Cross (until 1958); The Lord Rowallan (1959–1963); Sir Charles Gairdner (1963–1968); Sir Edric Bastyan (1968–1973); Sir Stanley Burbury (1973–1982); Sir James Plimsoll (1982–1987); Sir Phillip Bennett (1987–1995); Sir Guy Green (1995–2003); Richard Butler (2003–2004); William Cox (2004–2008); Peter Underwood (2008–2014); Kate Warner (2014–2021); Barbara Baker (from 2021)
43		David Bartlett; MHA for Denison (born 1968)	2010	26 May 2008	24 January 2011	2 years, 243 days	Labor	Elizabeth II (1952–2022); Governor: Sir Ronald Cross (until 1958); The Lord Rowallan (1959–1963); Sir Charles Gairdner (1963–1968); Sir Edric Bastyan (1968–1973); Sir Stanley Burbury (1973–1982); Sir James Plimsoll (1982–1987); Sir Phillip Bennett (1987–1995); Sir Guy Green (1995–2003); Richard Butler (2003–2004); William Cox (2004–2008); Peter Underwood (2008–2014); Kate Warner (2014–2021); Barbara Baker (from 2021)
44		Lara Giddings; MHA for Franklin (born 1972)	—	24 January 2011	31 March 2014	3 years, 66 days	Labor	Elizabeth II (1952–2022); Governor: Sir Ronald Cross (until 1958); The Lord Rowallan (1959–1963); Sir Charles Gairdner (1963–1968); Sir Edric Bastyan (1968–1973); Sir Stanley Burbury (1973–1982); Sir James Plimsoll (1982–1987); Sir Phillip Bennett (1987–1995); Sir Guy Green (1995–2003); Richard Butler (2003–2004); William Cox (2004–2008); Peter Underwood (2008–2014); Kate Warner (2014–2021); Barbara Baker (from 2021)
45		Will Hodgman; MHA for Franklin (born 1969)	2014	31 March 2014	20 January 2020	5 years, 295 days	Liberal	Elizabeth II (1952–2022); Governor: Sir Ronald Cross (until 1958); The Lord Rowallan (1959–1963); Sir Charles Gairdner (1963–1968); Sir Edric Bastyan (1968–1973); Sir Stanley Burbury (1973–1982); Sir James Plimsoll (1982–1987); Sir Phillip Bennett (1987–1995); Sir Guy Green (1995–2003); Richard Butler (2003–2004); William Cox (2004–2008); Peter Underwood (2008–2014); Kate Warner (2014–2021); Barbara Baker (from 2021)
45		Will Hodgman; MHA for Franklin (born 1969)	2018	31 March 2014	20 January 2020	5 years, 295 days	Liberal	Elizabeth II (1952–2022); Governor: Sir Ronald Cross (until 1958); The Lord Rowallan (1959–1963); Sir Charles Gairdner (1963–1968); Sir Edric Bastyan (1968–1973); Sir Stanley Burbury (1973–1982); Sir James Plimsoll (1982–1987); Sir Phillip Bennett (1987–1995); Sir Guy Green (1995–2003); Richard Butler (2003–2004); William Cox (2004–2008); Peter Underwood (2008–2014); Kate Warner (2014–2021); Barbara Baker (from 2021)
46		Peter Gutwein; MHA for Bass (born 1964)	—	20 January 2020	8 April 2022	2 years, 78 days	Liberal	Elizabeth II (1952–2022); Governor: Sir Ronald Cross (until 1958); The Lord Rowallan (1959–1963); Sir Charles Gairdner (1963–1968); Sir Edric Bastyan (1968–1973); Sir Stanley Burbury (1973–1982); Sir James Plimsoll (1982–1987); Sir Phillip Bennett (1987–1995); Sir Guy Green (1995–2003); Richard Butler (2003–2004); William Cox (2004–2008); Peter Underwood (2008–2014); Kate Warner (2014–2021); Barbara Baker (from 2021)
46		Peter Gutwein; MHA for Bass (born 1964)	2021	20 January 2020	8 April 2022	2 years, 78 days	Liberal	Elizabeth II (1952–2022); Governor: Sir Ronald Cross (until 1958); The Lord Rowallan (1959–1963); Sir Charles Gairdner (1963–1968); Sir Edric Bastyan (1968–1973); Sir Stanley Burbury (1973–1982); Sir James Plimsoll (1982–1987); Sir Phillip Bennett (1987–1995); Sir Guy Green (1995–2003); Richard Butler (2003–2004); William Cox (2004–2008); Peter Underwood (2008–2014); Kate Warner (2014–2021); Barbara Baker (from 2021)
47		Jeremy Rockliff; MHA for Braddon (born 1970)	—	8 April 2022	Incumbent	4 years, 194 days	Liberal	Elizabeth II (1952–2022); Governor: Sir Ronald Cross (until 1958); The Lord Rowallan (1959–1963); Sir Charles Gairdner (1963–1968); Sir Edric Bastyan (1968–1973); Sir Stanley Burbury (1973–1982); Sir James Plimsoll (1982–1987); Sir Phillip Bennett (1987–1995); Sir Guy Green (1995–2003); Richard Butler (2003–2004); William Cox (2004–2008); Peter Underwood (2008–2014); Kate Warner (2014–2021); Barbara Baker (from 2021)
47		Jeremy Rockliff; MHA for Braddon (born 1970)	2024	8 April 2022	Incumbent	4 years, 194 days	Liberal	Charles III (2022–present); Governor: Barbara Baker
47		Jeremy Rockliff; MHA for Braddon (born 1970)	2025	8 April 2022	Incumbent	4 years, 194 days	Liberal	Charles III (2022–present); Governor: Barbara Baker

== See also ==
- List of premiers of Tasmania by time in office
- Leader of the Opposition (Tasmania)
- Governors of Tasmania
