= Henry Gill (Australian politician) =

Australian politician

Member of the Tasmanian House of Assembly for Kingborough
- In office 15 March 1887 – January 1897 Serving with Edward Crowther
- Preceded by: Richard Lucas
- Succeeded by: Seat abolished

Personal details
- Born: Henry Horatio Gill; October 1840 New Norfolk, Tasmania
- Died: 4 March 1914 (aged 73) Hobart, Tasmania

Henry Horatio Gill (October 1840 – 4 March 1914) was an Australian politician.

Gill was born in New Norfolk in Van Diemen's Land in 1840. In 1887 he was elected to the Tasmanian House of Assembly, representing the seat of Kingborough. He served until 1897. He died in 1912 in Hobart.

Tasmanian House of Assembly
Preceded by Richard Lucas	Member for Kingborough; 1887–1897; Served alongside: Edward Crowther	Abolished
