= John Edward Bromby =

John Edward Bromby (23 May 1809 – 4 March 1889) was an Australian schoolmaster and Anglican cleric.

Bromby was born in Hull, England, the son of the Reverend John Healey Bromby and his wife Jane, née Amis. His brother was Charles Henry Bromby, later Bishop of Tasmania. Bromby was educated at Hull Grammar School and Uppingham. He was elected a fellow of St John's College.

Bromby was ordained deacon in 1834 and priest in 1836. He was appointed second master at Bristol College (Note: This Bristol College was a short-lived entity, which operated 1831–1841. Its first principal was J. H. Jerrard, succeeded by Bromby, and lastly, for a few months, Dr J. Booth.) in 1836.
