= John Alexander Jackson (Tasmanian politician) =

Australian politician

John Alexander Jackson B.A., (c. 1844 – 18 February 1889) was a politician in colonial Tasmania, Attorney-General of Tasmania 1872 to 1873.

Jackson was the youngest son of John Alexander Jackson, an architect in Tasmania, was educated at Queen's College, Oxford, and entered as a student at the Middle Temple in November 1864, being called to the bar in June 1868. He subsequently returned to Tasmania, and was admitted to the bar of that colony, practising at Hobart.

Jackson was member of the Tasmanian House of Assembly for the Electoral district of Queenborough from 8 September 1871 until resigning in July 1876. Jackson was Attorney-General in the Frederick Innes ministry from November 1872 to August 1873, and died on 18 February 1889, aged forty-five years.
