= George Fitzgerald (politician) =

Australian politician

George Parker Fitzgerald (13 February 1843 – 28 March 1917), was a merchant and politician in colonial Tasmania, member of the Executive Council of Tasmania.

Fitzgerald was born in Hobart, son of James FitzGerald (or Fitzgerald), superintendent in the Hobart General Hospital, and his wife Eleanor, née Scott.

Caricature by David Low

Fitzgerald was educated at The Hutchins School and after some experience in Hobart, moved to Sydney at 19 years of age. While in Sydney he married Mary Love on 28 November 1863; they had ten children together. After Mary's death on 3 May 1881 Fitzgerald returned to Hobart, there he established an agency for Robert Gray & Co., wholesale merchants. In 1886, Fitzgerald purchased Gray's business, and converted the warehouses into FitzGerald's, which would go on to become the largest retailer in Tasmania.

Fitzgerald represented of West Hobart in the Tasmanian House of Assembly from 26 July 1886 to 22 May 1891. He was appointed a member of the Philip Fysh Ministry, with a seat in the Executive Council, without office, in October 1888. He was chairman of the Board of Technical Education, and of the Chamber of Commerce, Hobart.

Fitzgerald died on 28 March 1917 in Hobart, leaving an estate of over £10,000 to his wife, four sons and two daughters. He was buried privately at Cornelian Bay Cemetery.
