= William Brown (Tasmanian politician) =

Australian politician

William Henry Thomas Brown (14 August 1840 – 21 July 1926) was an Australian politician and sailor. He was a member of the Tasmanian House of Assembly from 1882 to 1889 and from 1893 to 1893, both times representing the electorate of Campbell Town.

Brown was born in Hobart, the son of a businessman and Mary nee Rock, and was educated at the high school there, but left school at twelve to become a sailor. He worked on a boat owned by his father, Pet, trading between Australia and Mauritius. He became a ship's master at nineteen, captaining the India, trading between Australia and New Zealand, before returning to his old ship and route. In 1856, he broke the record for a journey from Melbourne to the English Channel in the clipper Heather Bell, which reportedly remained unbeaten at the time of his death. In 1862, in the Thomas Brown, he came to public attention when he brought the news of the death of Albert, Prince Consort from Mauritius before the ordinary mail from Britain had arrived in Australia.

In 1882 he was elected to the Tasmanian House of Assembly as the member for Campbell Town. He retired in 1889 to take up the position of Conservator of Forests. In this capacity, he proposed a reforesting program, but was not supported. In 1892, he resigned his government role and was re-elected to his old seat in 1893. He was re-elected several times, but was defeated in 1903 for the new seat of Cambria after Campbell Town was abolished in a redistribution. He nominated to contest Queensborough at the 1906 state election, before withdrawing and unexpectedly contesting the 1906 federal election in Denison as an independent instead; he was met with a dismissive public response and lost his deposit.

In 1913, he was captaining the Rachel Cohen, which made an unsuccessful attempt to resupply the Australasian Antarctic Expedition at Macquarie Island. He was still sailing as late as 1916, when he was chief officer on the cargo ship Dart. In 1920, Brown was involved in an oil-drilling venture on Bruny Island. In later years, Brown served as a justice of the peace, and was a made a life member of the Hobart Working Men's Association in 1923. He died in Hobart in 1926 and was buried at Cornelian Bay Cemetery. He was twice married, in 1863 and 1879, with eight children from his first marriage and four children from his second.
