= Edmund Henry Sutton =

Australian politician

Member of the Tasmanian House of Assembly for Cressy
- In office 26 July 1886 – 24 April 1893
- Preceded by: New seat
- Succeeded by: Daniel Burke

Personal details
- Born: Edmund Henry Sutton; 27 July 1838 Launceston, Van Diemen's Land
- Died: 24 April 1893 (aged 54) Launceston, Tasmania

Edmund Henry Sutton (27 July 1838 – 24 April 1893) was an Australian politician.

Sutton was born in Launceston in Tasmania in 1838. In 1886 he was elected to the Tasmanian House of Assembly, representing the seat of Cressy. He served until his death in Launceston in 1893.

Tasmanian House of Assembly
New seat	Member for Cressy; 1886–1893	Succeeded by Daniel Burke
