= James Reid Scott =

Australian politician

James Reid Scott (1 April 1839 – 25 August 1877) was an explorer and colonial Tasmanian politician, member of the Tasmanian House of Assembly and later the Tasmanian Legislative Council, he was also Colonial Secretary of Tasmania.

Scott was the elder son of Thomas Scott, a former Assistant Surveyor-General of Tasmania, and his wife Ann, née Reid. Scott was born in Earlston, Berwickshire, Scotland or Gattonside, Melrose. Scott was educated as a surveyor, but never practised his profession. Scott made many exploring expeditions in the western and north-east districts of Tasmania, and did valuable work in mapping the Western Highlands of the colony. Accounts of some of his explorations appear in the Transactions of the Royal Society of Tasmania for the years 1872 and 1875.

Scott represented the district of Selby in the House of Assembly from October 1866 to November 1872. On accepting office as Colonial Secretary in the Frederick Innes Ministry on 4 November 1872, he resigned his seat in the Assembly, and was elected to the Legislative Council for the Electoral division of South Esk. He held the office of Colonial Secretary until the retirement of the Innes Ministry on 4 August 1873. Scott died at Hobart on 25 August 1877.
