= Daniel Burke (Australian politician) =

Australian politician

Member of the Tasmanian House of Assembly for Cressy
- In office 16 May 1893 – 2 April 1903
- Preceded by: Edmund Sutton
- Succeeded by: Seat abolished

Personal details
- Born: Daniel Burke; 26 June 1827 Thurles, County Tipperary, Ireland
- Died: 13 August 1927 (aged 100) Moltema, Tasmania

Daniel Burke (26 June 1827 – 13 August 1927) was an Australian politician.

Burke was born in Thurles in County Tipperary in 1827. In 1893 he won a by-election for the Tasmanian House of Assembly seat of Cressy following Edmund Sutton's death. He served until the abolition of his seat in 1903. He died in 1927 in Moltema.

Tasmanian House of Assembly
| Preceded by Edmund Sutton | Member for Cressy; 1893–1903 | Seat abolished |
