= Electoral district of Cambria =

Former electoral district of Tasmania

The electoral district of Cambria was a single-member electoral district of the Tasmanian House of Assembly. It centred on the town of Campbell Town in the Midlands region of Tasmania between Hobart and Launceston.

The seat was created in a redistribution ahead of the 1903 state election, largely replacing the seat of Campbell Town, and was abolished when the Tasmanian parliament adopted the Hare-Clark electoral model in 1909. It had a single member during its existence, William Bennett.

== Members for Cambria ==
Member	Term
William Bennett	1903–1909
