= Electoral district of Longford =

Former Tasmanian House of Assembly electoral district

The Electoral district of Longford was a single-member electoral district of the Tasmanian House of Assembly. It centred on the town of Longford near Tasmania's second city, Launceston.

The seat was created in a redistribution ahead of the 1886 election, largely replacing the seat of Norfolk Plains, and was abolished when the Tasmanian parliament adopted the Hare-Clark electoral model in 1909.

== Members for Longford ==
Member	Term
Henry Dumaresq	1886–1903
Alfred Youl	1903–1909
