= Charles Hamilton Bromby =

Australian politician

Charles Bromby

Attorney-General of Tasmania
- In office 20 July 1876 – 9 August 1877
- Preceded by: William Giblin
- Succeeded by: William Giblin

Personal details
- Born: Charles Hamilton Bromby; 17 July 1843 Cheltenham, Gloucestershire, England
- Died: 24 July 1904 (aged 61) London, England
- Spouse: Mary Ellen Hensman
- Education: St Edmund Hall, Oxford
- Profession: Barrister

Charles Hamilton Bromby (17 July 1843 – 24 July 1904), BA LCL was an Attorney-General in the colonial Tasmanian government.

== Early life ==
Bromby was the second son of Right Rev. Charles Henry Bromby, Bishop of Tasmania, by Mary Anne, eldest daughter of the late William Hulme Bodley, of Brighton, Sussex. He was born at Cheltenham, Gloucestershire, on 17 July 1843, and educated at Cheltenham College and St Edmund Hall, Oxford, where he graduated.

== Legal and political career ==
He entered as a student of the Inner Temple on 7 June 1864, and was called to the bar on 18 November 1867. He emigrated to Tasmania, where he arrived in December 1874, and was M.H.A. for Central Launceston from 1876 to 1877, for Norfolk Plains from 1877 to 1878, and subsequently for Richmond. Bromby was Attorney-General in Reibey's Ministry, and a member of the Executive Council from 20 July 1876, to 9 August 1877. He was admitted a member of the bar of New South Wales in 1881; before returning to England, and practising as a barrister in London and on the North-Eastern Circuit. He edited Spike's Law of Master and Servant, 3rd edition.

Bromby was a supporter of Irish home rule and attended the Irish Race Convention in 1896.

== Personal life ==
Bromby married Mary Ellen Hensman. He died 24 July 1904, in St Marylebone, London, England.
