= Richard Lucas (Australian politician) =

Australian politician

Richard James Lucas (1 November 1837 – 17 July 1916) was a politician in colonial Tasmania.

Lucas was born at Kingston, Browns River, Tasmania and was educated at the school of the Rev. John Burrows of Brighton, Tasmania, and was admitted a solicitor of the Supreme Court of Tasmania, 2 August 1865. Lucas was elected member of the Tasmanian House of Assembly for Kingborough on 20 January 1883, and again in 1886. Lucas accepted office without portfolio in the James Wilson Agnew Ministry on 25 February 1887, but failed to secure re-election, and the Ministry resigned on 29 March 1887.

Lucas died in Hobart, Tasmania on 17 July 1916.
