= Charles Bromby =

Anglican bishop of Tasmania

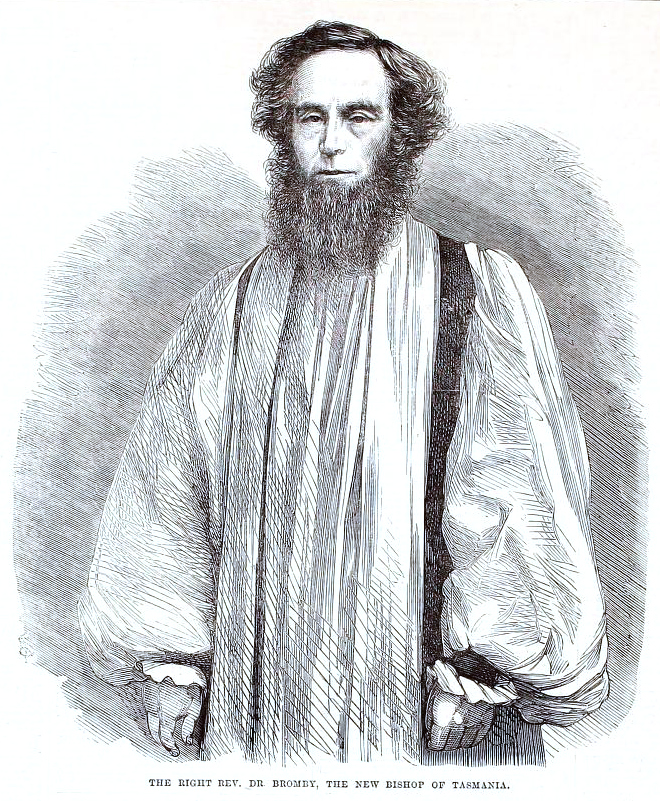

Charles Henry Bromby (11 July 1814 – 14 April 1907) was the Anglican Bishop of Tasmania from 1864 to 1882.

== Early life ==
Bromby was the second son of John Healey Bromby (a priest) and brother of John Edward Bromby. He was born in Hull, England.

== Career ==
Bromby was made deacon in Lichfield in 1838 and served as curate at Chesterfield from 1838 to 1839; and was ordained priest in 1839 in York and was headmaster of Stepney Grammar School from 1839.

Bromby returned to England and became rector of Shrawardine-cum-Montford (1882–1887), and assistant-bishop of Lichfield (1882–1891).

== Legacy ==
His second son Charles Hamilton was in the Tasmanian government. The Tasmanian synod founded a studentship in Bromby's memory in 1910.

Anglican Communion titles
Preceded by Francis Nixon	Bishop of Tasmania; 1864–1882	Succeeded by Daniel Sandford
