= Electoral district of Norfolk Plains =

Former Tasmanian House of Assembly electoral district

The Electoral district of Norfolk Plains was a single-member electoral district of the Tasmanian House of Assembly. It was based near the town of Longford to the south of Launceston, Tasmania's second city, and also included the towns of Carrick and Perth.

The seat was created ahead of the Assembly's first election held in 1856, and was abolished at the 1886 election, being replaced with the new Longford seat.

== Members for Norfolk Plains ==
Member	Term
John Gregson	1856–1859
John Archer	1859–1861
William Dodery	1861–1870
Charles Rocher	1870–1871
Adye Douglas	1871–1872
Frederick Houghton	1872–1876
Charles Meredith	1876–1877
Charles Bromby	1877–1878
Andrew Inglis Clark	1878–1882
William Henry Archer	1882–1886
