= John Balfe =

Australian politician

John Donnellan Balfe (1816 – 13 December 1880) was an Australian politician, member of the Tasmanian House of Assembly.

== Early life ==
Balfe was the son of James Balfe and Sara Sutherland his wife, daughter of the last Lord Duffus, was born at Sallybrook, Drumcondra, Ireland. He was educated at Clongowes Wood College, near Dublin, conducted by Jesuits, where he received a good classical education. After leaving college he joined the Life Guards, and was stationed at Windsor for two years. He was one of those detailed to escort the Queen on her marriage from Windsor Castle to Buckingham Palace.

Balfe took an active part in the political affairs of Ireland, and became a prominent member of the Repeal Association under O'Connell. He was one of the declaimers at Conciliation Hall, and warmly advocated the redress of Irish grievances. He was also identified with the Irish confederation, but withdrew from the party on finding their schemes were wild and visionary, and could not be attained without a general rising of the peasantry. He was author of a number of letters on the Landlord and Tenant question published in the Dublin Evening Post and signed "An Irish Farmer," and also contributed to a Liverpool journal under the name of "Peter Carroll, Stonemason." In 1850 he married Mary, daughter of Terence O'Reilly of Ballybeg.

== Australia ==
Shortly after marriage, Balfe emigrated to Tasmania bringing letters of introduction from the Lord Lieutenant of Ireland to Governor William Denison. Shortly after his arrival was appointed Assistant Comptroller General of Convicts. After three years he resigned his office, and went to reside on his location at Lisadern, near Port Cygnet, Huon River. He brought himself into notice as the writer of letters signed "Bill Shingle," which called attention to the wants of the Huon district, and also as the author of a series of letters signed "Dion," in opposition to the aims of the Australasian Anti-Transportation League. On the introduction of responsible government in 1856, he was elected a member of the House of Assembly for the Franklin district. He retained his seat in the Assembly, with the exception of one session, until his death, a period of twenty-four years, representing successively [Franklin, South Launceston, and West Hobart.

== Legacy ==
Balfe's speeches were marked by considerable power of humorous satire, and his ability and force as a debater made him for many years a prominent figure in Tasmanian politics. He was at various periods editor of several Tasmanian newspapers. He died at Hobart on 13 December 1880. An account of his trial for assaulting Mr. T. G. Gregson was published in Tasmania in 1863.
