= Electoral district of Cressy =

Former electoral district of the Tasmanian House of Assembly

The electoral district of Cressy was a single-member electoral district of the Tasmanian House of Assembly. It centred on the town of Cressy to the south west of Launceston.

The seat was created ahead of the 1886 election out of the eastern section of the abolished seat of Ringwood, and was abolished at the 1903 election.

== Members for Cressy ==
Member	Term
Edmund Henry Sutton	1886–1893
Daniel Burke	1893–1903
