= George Keach =

Australian politician

Member of the Tasmanian House of Assembly for Campbell Town
- In office 10 March 1870 – May 1882
- Preceded by: William Dobson
- Succeeded by: William Brown

Personal details
- Born: George William Keach; 12 July 1824 England
- Died: 10 February 1893 (aged 68) Ross, Tasmania

George William Keach (12 July 1824 – 10 February 1893) was an Australian politician.

Keach was born in England in 1824. In 1870 he was elected to the Tasmanian House of Assembly, representing the seat of Campbell Town. He served until 1882, when his re-election was invalidated. He died in 1893 in Ross.

Tasmanian House of Assembly
Preceded by William Dobson	Member for Campbell Town; 1870–1882	Succeeded by William Brown
