= William Bennett (Australian politician) =

Australian politician

William Henry Bennett (29 January 1843 – 20 August 1929) was an Australian politician.

He was born in Launceston. In 1889 he was elected to the Tasmanian House of Assembly as the member for Campbell Town. He was defeated in 1893, but returned in 1903 as the member for Cambria. In 1909, with the introduction of proportional representation, he ran for Franklin but was defeated. He died in Ross in 1929.
