= Electoral district of Central Launceston =

Former electoral district of Tasmania (1871–1886)

The electoral district of Central Launceston, sometimes referred to as Launceston Central, was a single-member electoral district of the Tasmanian House of Assembly. It was based in the centre of Launceston, Tasmania's second city, and its inner suburbs.

The seat had two separate existences. It was initially created ahead of the 1871 election and abolished at the 1886 election. It was then recreated ahead of the 1903 election, and was abolished when the Tasmanian parliament adopted the Hare-Clark electoral model in 1909.

== Members for Central Launceston ==
First incarnation (1871–1886)
Member	Term
Henry Lette	1871–1875
George Gilmore	1875–1876
Charles Bromby	1876–1877
William Hart	1877–1885
(Vacant)	1885–1886
Second incarnation (1903–1909)
Member	Term
Robert Sadler	1903–1909
