= Christopher O'Reilly =

Australian politician

Hon. Christopher O'Reilly, K.S.G., (1835 – 11 January 1910) was a politician in colonial Tasmania.

O'Reilly was member for Kingborough in the Tasmanian House of Assembly from 28 September 1871 to December 1882. He was later member for Ringarooma in the Assembly from 29 March 1906 to 30 April 1909.

O'Reilly was Minister of Lands and Works in Tasmania from August 1876 to August 1877, in the Reibey Ministry, and was sworn of the Executive Council on the former date.

O'Reilly held the same portfolio in the Crowther and Giblin Ministries from Dec. 1878 to Dec. 1882, when he resigned and accepted the appointment of Stipendiary Magistrate at Scottsdale. Mr. O'Reilly was created a Knight of St. Gregory by Pope Leo XIII. On 4 May 1909, O'Reilly was elected to the Tasmanian Legislative Council for South Esk as an independent, holding that position until his death.

Tasmanian Legislative Council
Preceded by Robert Scott	Member for South Esk; 1909–1910	Succeeded by Arthur Loone
