= James Scott (Australian politician) =

Australian politician

Member of the Tasmanian House of Assembly for George Town
- In office 9 July 1869 – June 1877
- Preceded by: William Barnes
- Succeeded by: George Gilmore

Member of the Tasmanian House of Assembly for South Launceston
- In office 16 July 1878 – 15 October 1884
- Preceded by: Samuel Tulloch
- Succeeded by: William Hartnoll

Personal details
- Born: 1810 Earlston, Berwickshire
- Died: 15 October 1884 (aged 73–74) Launceston, Tasmania

James Scott (1810 – 15 October 1884) was an Australian politician.

Scott was born in Earlston, Berwickshire, in Scotland in 1810. In 1869 he was elected to the Tasmanian House of Assembly, representing the seat of George Town. He served until 1877, and was then elected for South Launceston in 1878, serving until his death in Launceston in 1884.

Tasmanian House of Assembly
Preceded by William Barnes	Member for George Town; 1869–1877	Succeeded by George Gilmore
Preceded by Samuel Tulloch	Member for South Launceston; 1878–1884	Succeeded by William Hartnoll
