= Henry Dumaresq =

Tasmanian cricketer and politician

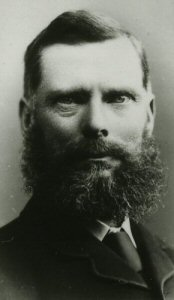

Member for Longford
- In office 26 July 1886 – 12 May 1903
- Preceded by: New seat
- Succeeded by: Alfred Youl

Personal details
- Born: Henry Rowland Gascoigne Dumaresq; 20 February 1839 Longford, Van Diemen's Land
- Died: 31 October 1924 (aged 85) Ulverstone, Tasmania, Australia
- Cricket career

Cricket information
- Batting: Left-handed

Domestic team information
- Years: Team
- 1868: Tasmania
- Source: Cricinfo, 7 January 2016

Henry Rowland Gascoigne Dumaresq (20 February 1839 – 31 October 1924) was an Australian politician who represented the electoral district of Longford in the Tasmanian House of Assembly between 1886 and 1903. He was elected to the Tasmanian House of Assembly on 26 July 1886 and resigned on 12 May 1903.

He was the son of Edward Dumaresq (1802–1906), who had migrated to Van Dieman's Land (Tasmania), in 1825, around the time that his brother-in-law Ralph Darling became Governor of New South Wales. He was the nephew of Henry Dumaresq (1792–1838) and William Dumaresq (1793–1868). It is likely that he was named after his uncle, who had died in the year before Dumaresq was born.

Dumaresq also played one first-class cricket match for Tasmania in 1868, almost twenty years before he entered parliament.

== See also ==
- List of Tasmanian representative cricketers

Tasmanian House of Assembly
New title	Member for Longford; 1886–1903	Succeeded by Alfred Youl
