= Henry Butler (politician) =

Australian politician

Henry Butler (16 or 17 November 1821 – 22 August 1885), was a surgeon and politician in colonial Tasmania.

Butler was the third son of Gamaliel Butler, solicitor, and was born in Cornhill, London, England. In 1823 the family emigrated to Van Diemen's Land (later renamed Tasmania). Butler was educated in England, and chose medicine as his profession, becoming a member of the Royal College of Surgeons in 1843, and in 1849 a fellow of that college. After studying at some of the hospitals on the Continent, he returned to Tasmania, and began the practice of his profession in Hobart.

Butler contested the seat of Brighton in the old unicameral Tasmanian Legislative Council without success in 1851, however he was elected in 1854. On the introduction of free institutions in September 1856 he entered the new Tasmanian House of Assembly (lower house) as member for Brighton, holding the seat, apart from the period from November 1862 to October 1866, until his death. In August 1869 Butler became a member of the James Wilson Ministry without portfolio. In the following October he was appointed Minister of Lands and Works, a position which he held till November 1872, when he resigned with his colleagues. He succeeded Sir Robert Officer as Speaker of the Tasmanian House of Assembly in April 1877, and having been twice re-elected in the interval, resigned in July 1885. Dr. Butler took a prominent part in educational matters. In 1853 he was appointed a member of the Central Board of Education for the colony. In 1856, when two boards were appointed, he became Chairman of the Southern Board. In 1863, shortly after the amalgamation of the two boards, he was appointed Chairman of the Central Board in succession to William Nairn. Butler had the role of Surveyor General of Tasmania (as Minister of Lands) from 1869 to 1872. As chairman he administered the educational system of the colony with ability and success until the abolition of the Board of Education in 1884 and the transference of the control of the education department to a Minister directly responsible to Parliament. Dr. Butler married Catherine Smith, daughter of Thomas Smith, of Glen Rock, Sydney. He died at Hobart on 22 August 1885.

Political offices
| Preceded by Robert Officer | Speaker of the Tasmanian House of Assembly; 1877–1885 | Succeeded by Alfred Dobson |
