= William Burgess (politician) =

Australian politician

William Henry Burgess (21 May 1847 – 1 May 1917) was an Australian politician and businessman. Burgess was born in Hobart and was educated at the High School, Hobart, and at Horton College, Ross.

He began his career as a grocer but believing the administration needed improvement he stood as a City of Hobart alderman in 1876, winning the election. He became Mayor of Hobart in 1879 and in 1881 he stood for parliament, being elected House of Assembly member for West Hobart. He became Treasurer of Tasmania from 1884 to March 1887 under Premier Adye Douglas and James Agnew. Burgess, who was the recognised Leader of the Opposition to the Philip Fysh Ministry, was a captain unattached in the Tasmanian Defence Force. He was one of the Tasmanian delegates to the Federation Convention held in Sydney in 1891. In August 1891, owing to the stoppage of the Bank of Van Diemen's Land, with the management of which he was identified, Burgess resigned his seat in the Executive Council and in Parliament and his position as Leader of the Opposition.

In July 1909, Burgess chaired the meeting in Launceston that created the Tasmanian Liberal League, the state's first enduring anti-socialist organisation.

In 1916 Burgess made a return to Tasmanian politics, winning election to the multi-member seat of Denison as a Liberal; however, he died the following year in Hobart.
