= Electoral district of East Hobart =

Former Tasmanian House of Assembly electoral district

The electoral district of East Hobart, sometimes referred to as Hobart East, was an electoral district of the Tasmanian House of Assembly. It was based in Tasmania's capital city, Hobart and was historically difficult to find.

The seat was created as a single-member seat ahead of the 1871 election following the dissolution of the multi-member Hobart Town seat. It was temporarily abolished at the 1886 election when neighbouring seats absorbed its area and became two-member seats.

The seat was then recreated as a single-member seat at the 1903 election and remained East Hobart when the Tasmanian parliament adopted the Hare-Clark electoral model for the entire state in 1909.

== Members for East Hobart ==
First incarnation: 1871–1886

Member	Term
Thomas Chapman	1871–1873
Philip Fysh	1873–1878
John Stokell Dodds	1878–1886

Second incarnation: 1903–1909

Member	Party	Term
Frank Bond	Opposition	1903–1906
William Jarvis	Independent	1906–1909
