= Electoral district of Queensborough =

Former electoral district of Tasmania

The electoral district of Queensborough was an electoral district of the Tasmanian House of Assembly. It was based in the southern suburbs of Tasmania's capital city, Hobart, in particular Sandy Bay, and surrounding districts such as Cascades, Taroona and Kingston.

The seat was created as a single-member seat ahead of the Assembly's first election held in 1856. It was abolished at the 1886 election when neighbouring Kingborough became a two-member seat.

The seat was then recreated as a single-member seat at the 1897 election and was abolished when the Tasmanian parliament adopted the Hare-Clark electoral model for the entire state in 1909.

== Members for Queenborough ==
First incarnation: 1856–1886

Member	Term
Duncan McPherson	1856–1861
Thomas Chapman	1861–1862
Robert Walker	1862–1871
John Alexander Jackson	1871–1876
Robert Gayer	1876–1878
Edward Crowther	1878–1886

Second incarnation: 1897–1909

Member	Party	Term
Edward Crowther	Ministerial	1897–1909
