= Electoral district of Oatlands =

Former electoral district of the Tasmanian House of Assembly, Australia

The electoral district of Oatlands was a single-member electoral district of the Tasmanian House of Assembly. Its population centre was the town of Oatlands to the north of Hobart.

The seat was created ahead of the Assembly's first election held in 1856, and was abolished at the 1903 election, when it was merged with the neighbouring seats of Campbell Town and the northern part of Glamorgan into the new district of Cambria.

== Members for Oatlands ==
Member	Term
Henry Anstey	1856–1859
James MacLanachan	1859–1862
James Lord	1862–1871
George Wilson	1871–1876
Alfred Pillinger	1876–1899
William Burbury	1899–1903
