= Edward Crowther (politician) =

Australian politician

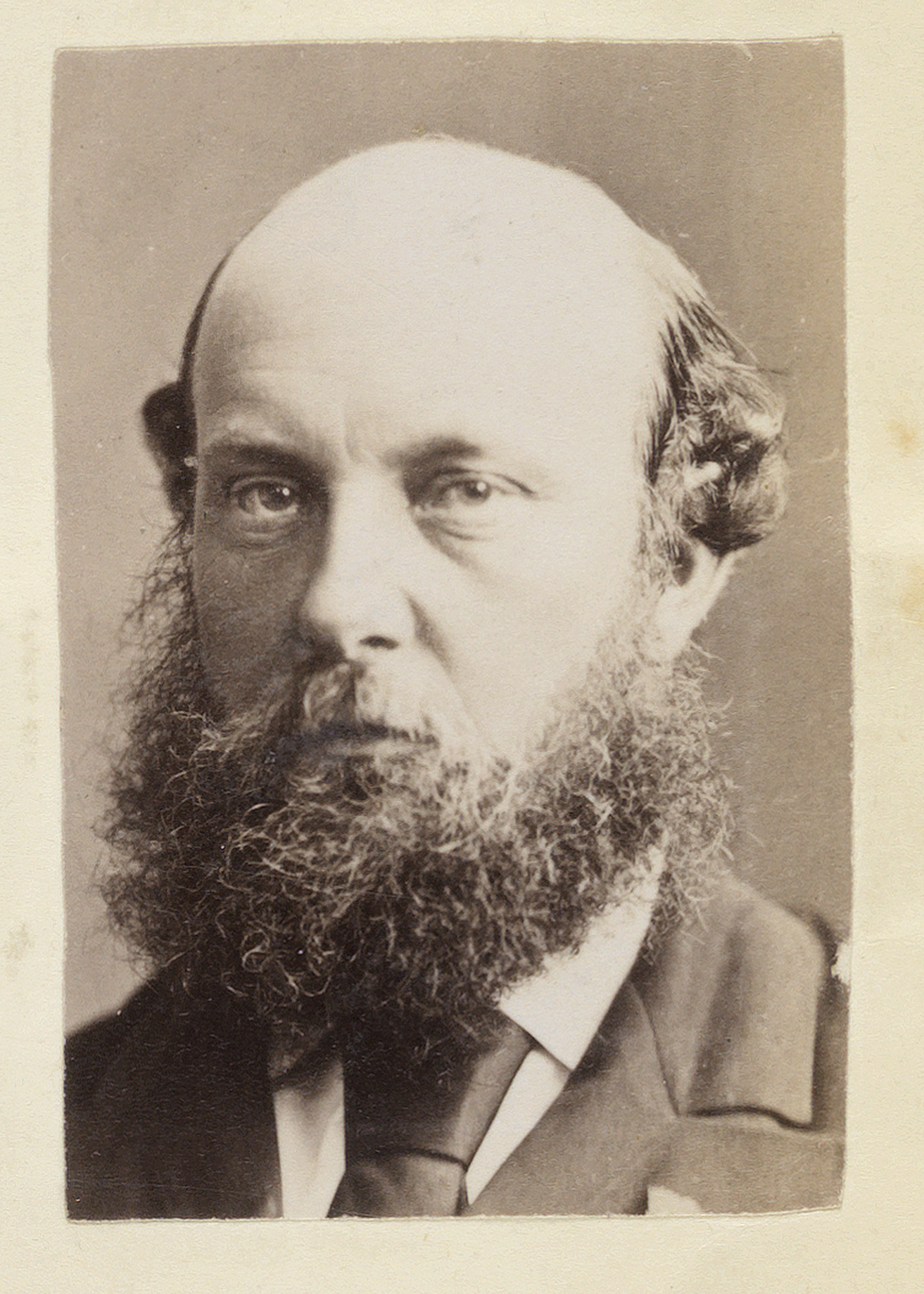
Crowther c. 1894

Edward Lodewyk Crowther (3 October 1843 – 9 August 1931) was an Australian politician.

He was born in Hobart. His father, William Crowther, was Premier of Tasmania from 1878 to 1879. In 1878 Edward Crowther was elected to the Tasmanian House of Assembly as the member for Queenborough. He was one of two members for Kingborough from 1886 to 1897 when the seat of Queenborough was incorporated into it; Queenborough was restored in 1897 and Crowther remained its member. With the introduction of proportional representation in 1909 he was elected to the seat of Denison as an Anti-Socialist. He retired in 1912 and died in 1931 in Oyster Cove.
