= Charles Meredith (politician) =

Australian politician

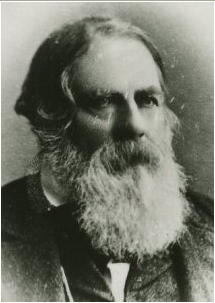
Charles Meredith

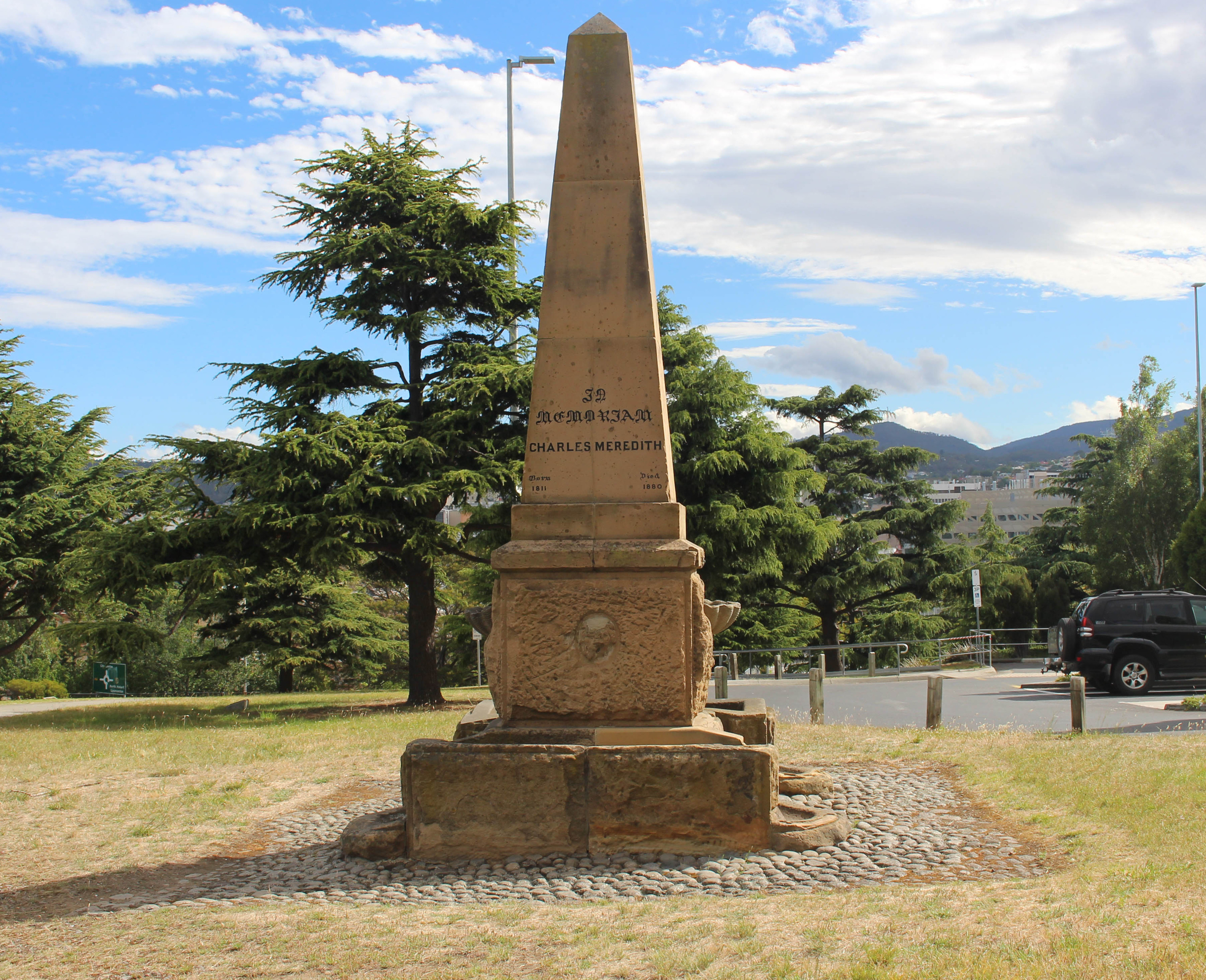
Charles Meredith monument in Hobart, Tasmania

Charles Meredith (29 May 1811 – 2 March 1880) was an Australian grazier and politician. He served as Tasmanian Colonial Treasurer for several years in the mid-to-late 19th century.

== Life ==
They sailed for Sydney in the Letitia and arrived in September. While Charles inspected sheep stations on the Murrumbidgee River, Louisa stayed at Bathurst. After a few weeks in Sydney, they moved to suburban Homebush. Meredith then returned to Tasmania. In 1843, he was made a police magistrate at Port Sorell in the north-west.
