= Electoral district of South Launceston =

Former electoral district of Tasmania

The electoral district of South Launceston, sometimes referred to as Launceston South, was an electoral district of the Tasmanian House of Assembly. It was based in Tasmania's second city, Launceston, and the surrounding rural area.

The seat was created as a single-member seat ahead of the 1871 election following the dissolution of the multi-member Launceston seat. In 1886, it became a two-member seat, and at the 1897 election, it was abolished when the Launceston seat was recreated under a trial of the Hare-Clark model.

== Members for South Launceston ==
Single member: 1871–1886

Member	Term
Thomas Thomas	1871–1872
James Castley	1872–1874
John Balfe	1874–1877
Samuel Tulloch	1877–1878
James Scott	1878–1884
William Hartnoll	1884–1886

Two member: 1886–1897

Member 1	Term	Member 2	Term
David Scott	1886–1891	William Hartnoll	1886–1897
Samuel Sutton	1891–1897	William Hartnoll	1886–1897
