= Electoral district of West Hobart =

Former electoral district of the Tasmanian House of Assembly (1871–1897)

West Hobart Tasmania—House of Assembly
- State: Tasmania
- Dates current: 1871–1897, 1903–1909
- Demographic: Urban

The electoral district of West Hobart, sometimes referred to as Hobart West, was an electoral district of the Tasmanian House of Assembly. It was based in Tasmania's capital city, Hobart.

The seat was created as a single-member seat ahead of the 1871 election following the dissolution of the multi-member Hobart Town seat. In 1886, it became a two-member seat, and at the 1897 election, it was abolished when the seat of Hobart was created under a trial of the Hare-Clark model.

The seat was then recreated as a single-member seat at the 1903 election and was abolished when the Tasmanian parliament adopted the Hare-Clark electoral model for the entire state in 1909.

== Members for West Hobart ==
First incarnation: 1871–1897
Member	Term		
John Balfe	1871–1872		
James Gray	1872–1877		
John Balfe	1877–1880		
William Burgess	1881–1891	Two members: 1886–1897	
William Burgess	1881–1891	George Fitzgerald	1886–1891
George Hiddlestone	1891–1897	Edward Mulcahy	1891–1897

Second incarnation: 1903–1909
Member	Party	Term
George Brettingham-Moore	Opposition	1903–1909
