= Electoral district of Kingborough =

Former Tasmanian House of Assembly electoral district

The electoral district of Kingborough was an electoral district of the Tasmanian House of Assembly. It was based in the region to the immediate south of Tasmania's capital city, Hobart, and included the Huon Valley towns of Cygnet, Huonville, Kettering, Margate and Sandfly.

The seat was created as a single-member seat ahead of the Assembly's first election held in 1856. In 1886, it became a two-member seat and absorbed the neighbouring seat of Queenborough, whose member, Edward Crowther, was to win one of the seats at each of the three elections held under this system. At the 1897 election, Queenborough was recreated and Kingborough returned to being a single-member seat. It was abolished when the Tasmanian parliament adopted the Hare-Clark electoral model for the entire state in 1909.

== Members for Kingborough ==
Single member 1856–1886
Member	Term		
Alfred Nicholas	1856–1859		
Frederick Lipscombe	1859–1861		
John Perkins	1861–1866		
Charles Meredith	1866–1871		
Christopher O'Reilly	1871–1883		
Richard Lucas	1883–1886		
Two members 1886–1897
Richard Lucas	1886–1887	Edward Crowther	1886–1897
Henry Gill	1887–1897	Edward Crowther	1886–1897

Single-member 1897–1909
Member	Party	Term
John Evans	Ministerial	1897–1909
