= Electoral district of Westbury =

Former electoral district of the Tasmanian House of Assembly

The Electoral district of Westbury was a single-member electoral district of the Tasmanian House of Assembly. It centred on the town of Westbury near Tasmania's second city of Launceston.

The seat was created ahead of the Assembly's first election held in 1856, and was abolished when the Tasmanian parliament adopted the Hare-Clark electoral model in 1909. By far its longest-serving member was Thomas Reibey, who served as Premier of Tasmania from 20 July 1876 until 9 August 1877 and Speaker of the House from 12 July 1887 to 30 April 1891.

== Members for Westbury ==
| Member | Term |
|---|---|
| Thomas Field | 1856–1862 |
| Adye Douglas | 1862–1871 |
| John Millar | 1871–1874 |
| Thomas Reibey | 1874–1903 |
| Charles Allen | 1903–1909 |
