= Nicholas John Brown =

Australian politician

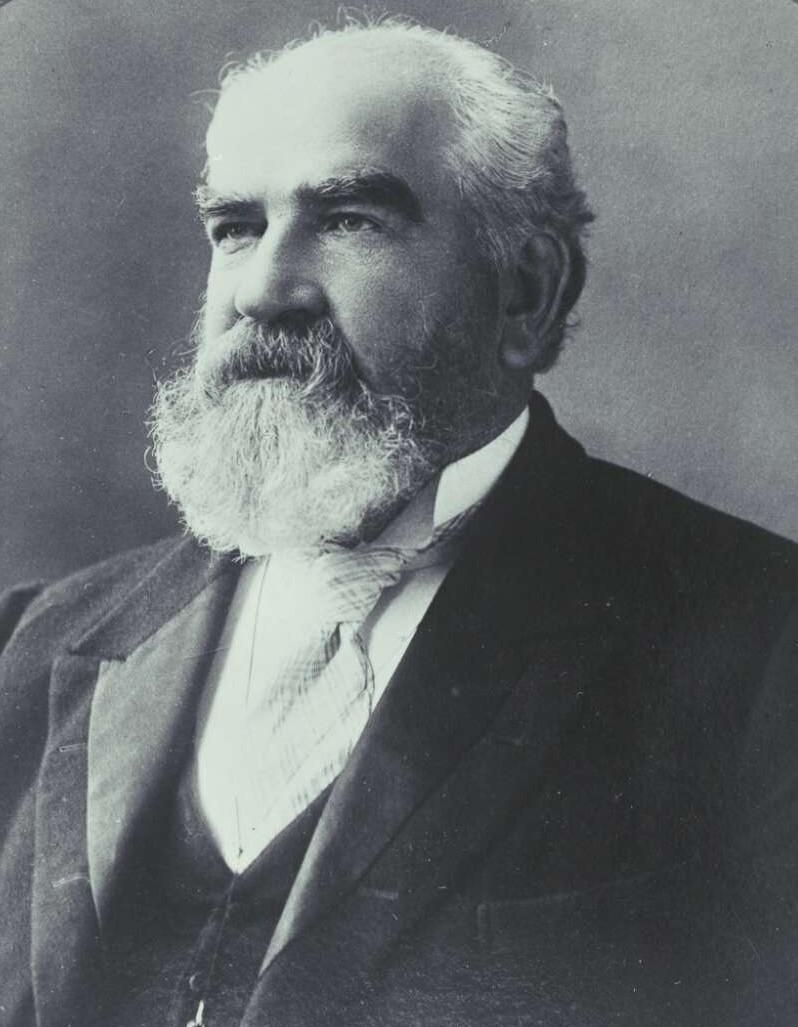
Brown at the 1898 Australasian Federal Convention.

Nicholas John Brown (9 October 1838 – 22 September 1903) was a pastoralist and politician in colonial Tasmania, a Speaker of the Tasmanian House of Assembly.

Brown was the son of Richard Brown, was born at Hobart and educated at the Hutchins School, Hobart, and later engaged in pastoral pursuits.

Brown was a member for the Cumberland District in the Tasmanian House of Assembly from January 1875. He was Minister of Lands and Works in the first Philip Fysh Ministry from August 1877 to December 1878, and held the same post in the William Giblin Ministry from December 1882 to August 1884, and in the Douglas and Agnew Ministries from that date till March 1887. Mr. Brown was one of the representatives of Tasmania at the Sydney Convention of 1883, at which the draft of the Federal Council Bill was agreed to. In March 1886 he was appointed one of the Tasmanian representatives in the Federal Council; but when the Fysh Ministry came into power he was objected to as a political opponent, and has not since taken his seat. In March 1891 Brown was one of the representatives of Tasmania at the Sydney Federation Convention. In July 1891 he was elected Speaker of the House of Assembly in succession to Thomas Reibey, a position he held until December 1893, and again from March 1897 until his death on 22 September 1903.
