= Alfred Pillinger =

Australian politician

The Honourable Alfred Thomas Pillinger
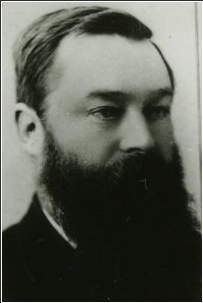

Minister of Lands and Works Tasmania
- In office October 1888 – August 1892
- Preceded by: Edward Braddon
- Constituency: Oatlands

Personal details
- Born: 1839 Antill Ponds, Van Diemen's Land
- Died: 6 May 1899 (aged 59–60) Hobart, Tasmania, Australia
- Spouse: Georgina née Nichols

Hon. Alfred Thomas Pillinger (1839 – 6 May 1899) was a landowner and politician in colonial Tasmania, Minister of Lands and Works 1888 to 1892.

Pillinger was born in Antill Ponds, near Oatlands, Van Diemen's Land (later renamed Tasmania), the son of James Pillinger and his wife Sophia, née Peters. He was educated at private schools and Horton College in Ross, Tasmania.

Pilliger was a member for Oatlands in the Tasmanian House of Assembly from 17 July 1876 until his death. In October 1888 he joined the Philip Fysh Government as Minister of Lands and Works, in succession to Edward Braddon. In August 1892 Pillinger resigned with his colleagues in the Fysh Ministry. Pillinger died in Hobart, Tasmania.
