= Electoral district of West Devon =

Former electoral district of the Tasmanian House of Assembly

The electoral district of West Devon was a single-member electoral district of the Tasmanian House of Assembly. It was based in the region surrounding the northern coastal town of Devonport.

The seat was created in a redistribution ahead of the 1871 election from part of the Devon electorate, and was abolished when the Tasmanian parliament adopted the Hare-Clark electoral model in 1909.

== Members for West Devon ==
| Member | Term |
|---|---|
| Charles Meredith | 1871–1876 |
| Andrew Crawford | 1876–1877 |
| Sir Edward Braddon | 1879–1888 |
| Sir John McCall | 1888–1893 |
| Sir Edward Braddon | 1893–1901 |
| Sir John McCall | 1901–1909 |
