= Electoral district of Cumberland (Tasmania) =

Former Tasmanian House of Assembly electoral district

The electoral district of Cumberland was a single-member electoral district of the Tasmanian House of Assembly. It was based in central Tasmania in towns such as Bothwell, Hamilton and Ouse, and until 1894 included much of the West Coast before the mining districts of Zeehan and Queenstown became large enough to require their own seats.

The seat was created ahead of the Assembly's first election held in 1856, and was abolished when the Tasmanian parliament adopted the Hare-Clark electoral model in 1909. Some controversy existed over the 1893 election result, as a redistribution still awaiting royal assent had not been carried out due to the snap election and the sitting member and Speaker of the House, Nicholas John Brown, lost the seat to Don Urquhart, a Zeehan solicitor. The Supreme Court ultimately resolved the matter in Brown's favour, and a new seat, Montagu, was created which Urquhart stood for and won.

== Members for Cumberland ==
Member	Term
Thomas Gellibrand	1856–1861
Frederick Synnott	1861–1862
John Sharland	1862–1865
William Sibley	1865–1871
John Swan	1871–1875
Nicholas John Brown	1875–1903
John Wood	1903–1909
