= Electoral district of Campbell Town =

Former Tasmanian House of Assembly electoral district

The electoral district of Campbell Town was a single-member electoral district of the Tasmanian House of Assembly. It centred on the towns of Campbell Town and Ross in the Midlands region of Tasmania between Hobart and Launceston.

The seat was created ahead of the Assembly's first election held in 1856, and was abolished at the 1903 election, when it was merged with neighbouring Oatlands and the northern part of Glamorgan into the new district of Cambria.

== Members for Campbell Town ==
Member	Term
William Race Allison	1856–1862
Thomas Chapman	1862–1864
William Lambert Dobson	1864–1870
George Keach	1870–1882
William Brown	1882–1889
William Bennett	1889–1893
William Brown	1893–1903
