= Hare–Clark electoral system =

Proportional-representation voting system

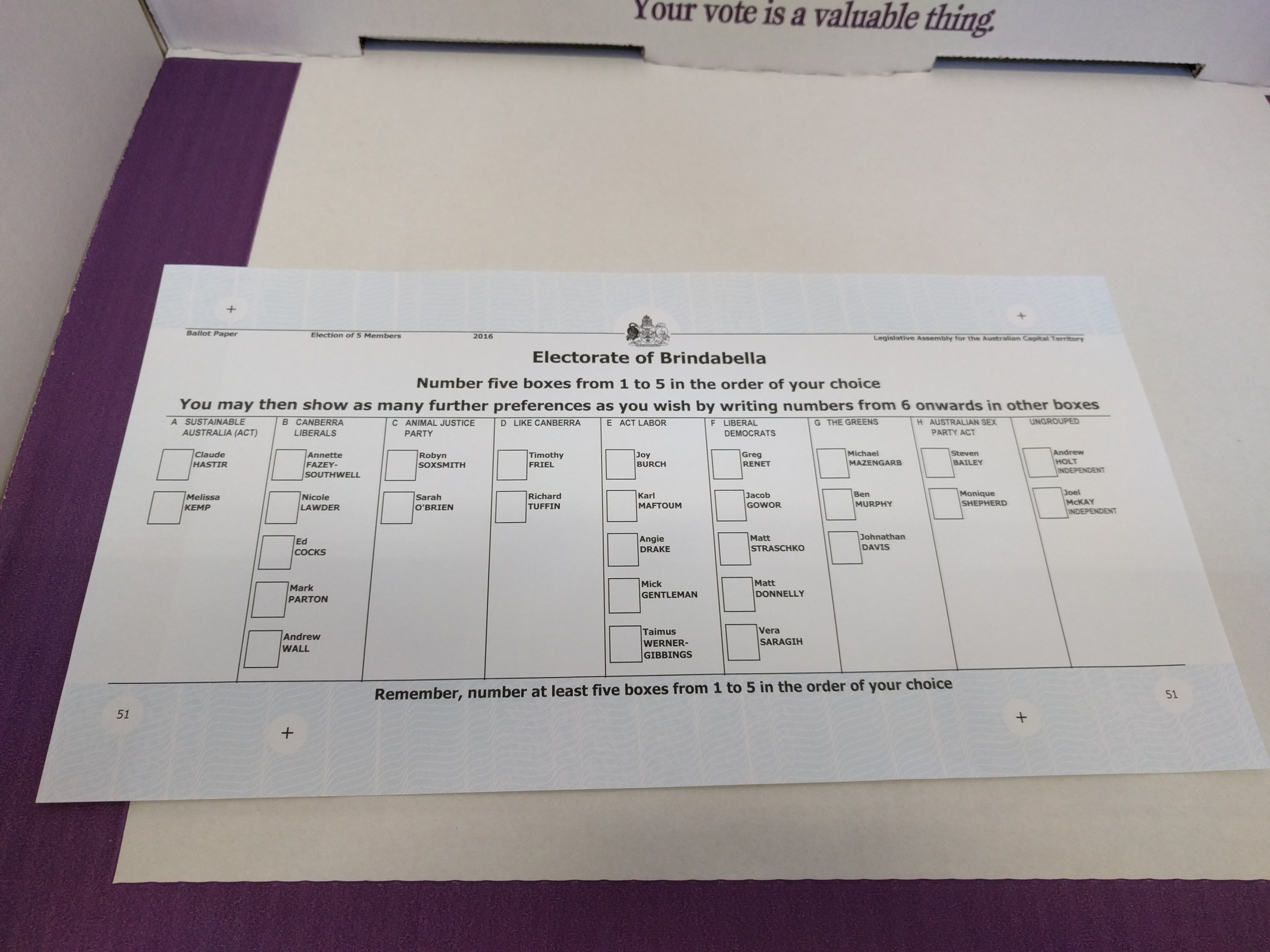
A Hare-Clark ballot paper for the electorate of Brindabella in the 2016 Australian Capital Territory election

Hare–Clark is a type of single transferable vote electoral system of proportional representation used for elections in Tasmania and the Australian Capital Territory. With its use in 1909, it was one of the first uses of the Gregory method for transfers of winner's surplus votes.

The name is derived from the names of English barrister Thomas Hare, the original inventor of single transferable voting, and Attorney-General of Tasmania Andrew Inglis Clark, who introduced a modified form to Tasmania in 1896.

== History ==
Thomas Hare (1806–1891) is generally credited with the conception of the single transferable vote, while Andrew Inglis Clark (1848–1907) introduced the system to Tasmania with a modified counting method.

"The specific modification introduced by Mr. A.I. Clark, Attorney-General for Tasmania, is the provision devised by him for eliminating the element of chance in the selection and distribution of quota-excesses or surplus transfer votes." The provision described as "Clark's own" was the Gregory method (later also adopted for the 1925 election of the Irish Senate), to transfer all votes to 'next order of preference' (the next usable marked preference), rather than a random sample.

In 1896, after several failed attempts, Clark succeeded in having a system of proportional representation adopted by the Tasmanian Parliament. It was accepted only on a trial basis in the two main cities, Hobart (to elect 6 MPs) and Launceston (to elect 4 MPs). This first 'Hare-Clark system', as it was immediately known, was renewed annually until suspended in 1902. Clark, never in robust health, died at his home 'Rosebank' in Battery Point on 14 November 1907, just as the adoption of permanent proportional representation struggled through Parliament and over a year before it was used for the first time throughout Tasmania in the 1909 Tasmanian state election. Districts were used (not state-wide districting), and district magnitude was five in each district - each district elected five members.

Hare-Clark has been used continuously for Tasmanian state elections since 1909 for the House of Assembly. (Tasmania's Legislative Council is elected by Instant-runoff voting, the same system as is used to elect members of the Australian House of Representatives.)

In the 1901 Australian federal election, the Hare-Clark system was used to elect 5 members for the Division of Tasmania, as the Federal voting rules were determined by the State.

The Hare-Clark System was implemented to elect the New South Wales Legislative Assembly in the 1920 elections. However Jack Lang changed the electoral system back to first past the post in single member electorates prior to the 1927 state election.

The Hare-Clark System has been used to elect the Australian Capital Territory Legislative Assembly since 1992.

=== Evolution ===
Features of Hare-Clark have evolved over time. Until 1942, candidates were listed in alphabetic order rather than grouped together by party. Robson Rotation, where the order candidates appeared on ballot papers is randomised, was introduced in 1980. This had the effect of reducing any advantage a candidate had by appearing at the top of a party list, so as to eliminate any influence of donkey votes.

As well, district magnitude (the number of seats used in districts) has changed since 1896.

== Counting ==
After a candidate reaches a quota and is elected, all of their ballot papers are redistributed to elect additional candidates based on the voters' next preferences indicated on each ballot paper. The redistributed votes have a reduced transfer value, which is determined by the relationship of the number of surplus votes received by the previously elected candidate compared to the total votes they hold.

In a round that starts with no candidate holding un-transferred surplus votes, the candidate with the fewest votes is eliminated, and their preferences are transferred at full value to the next usable preference marked on each ballot. Ballot papers with non-transferable votes are set aside during this process.

The process of conducting the vote count in Hare-Clark and Australian Senate style systems is largely similar, with only minor differences. Prior to the 2016 Australian federal election, group voting tickets were used for Senate elections. This allowed parties to determine the order in which preferences would be distributed to other candidates. This option for voters to have their preferences determined by group voting tickets is still in use in Victoria. In contrast, under Hare-Clark, preferences are always explicitly determined by individual voters, and there is no "above the line" voting option.

=== Counting method with example ===
1. Initial count

Any invalid votes are excluded (e.g. no boxes marked) and then the first preferences from each ballot paper are tallied.

They are allocated to marked candidate.

Example:

Of the total 10,500 votes cast by the electorate, 500 are invalid.
There are 10,000 valid votes remaining.

Each candidate's total is announced.

2. Determining the quota

The total count of valid votes is used to calculate the quota of votes required for a candidate to be declared elected (the Droop quota).

$\mbox{quota to be elected} = \left({{\rm \mbox{total valid votes}} \over {\rm \mbox{number of vacancies}}+1}\right) + 1$

Example:

There are 10,000 valid votes and 3 vacancies to be filled.

$$\mbox{quota to be elected} = \left({{\rm \mbox{10,000}} \over {\rm \mbox{3}}+1}\right) + 1 = 2,501$$

The quota to be elected is 2,501 votes.

3. Declaring candidates elected

Candidates who have more than the required quota of votes are declared elected. If there are still vacancies remaining, any surplus votes are distributed as outlined in 4 below.

The count is complete if there are no remaining vacancies.

Example:

Candidate PLATYPUS receives 3,000 first preference votes, and is more than the quota of 2,501.
Candidate PLATYPUS is declared elected.

4. Candidates with surplus votes

The number of votes in excess of the quota is a surplus of votes. The number of surplus votes is used to determine the transfer value of distributed preferences from the candidate.

4a. The transfer value is determined

$$\mbox{transfer value} = \left({{\rm \mbox{surplus votes}} \over {\rm \mbox{last votes received}}}\right)$$

Example:

Candidate PLATYPUS has 3,000 first preference votes, which is a 499 surplus above the quota.

$$\mbox{transfer value} = \left({{\rm \mbox{499}} \over {\rm \mbox{3,000}}}\right) = 0.166$$

The transfer value from PLATYPUS is 0.166.

4b. Distribution of preferences

The preferences from the elected candidate are tallied using all of their ballot papers, and is distributed at the rate of the transfer value.

$$\mbox{value of distributed preferences} = \mbox{number of preferences} * \mbox{transfer value}$$

Example:

Of the 3,000 first preference votes for Candidate PLATYPUS, 1,000 had Candidate WOMBAT as second preference. WOMBAT receives these votes but at the value of the transfer rate.

$$\mbox{1,000 * 0.166} = 166$$

Candidate WOMBAT has 166 added to their total. To put it another way - the proportion of PLATYPUS voters who second preferenced WOMBAT multiplied by PLATYPUS' surplus votes equals the number of votes that are added to WOMBAT's old votes.

4c. Counting the new totals

The new candidate totals are counted (return to 3).

Any candidate exceeding quota through these transfers is declared elect and those surplus votes transferred as well. However this time only the transfer that gave the candidate quota is used as basis for the transfer value, such as 199/300 where the surplus votes number 199 and the last transfer is 300.

When all surpluses have been transferred and if there are still vacant seats remaining, the count proceeds to 5.

The count is complete if there are no remaining vacancies.

5. Remaining candidates have not reached the quota

When there are still vacancies, but all the remaining candidates are equal to or less than the quota, the candidate with the lowest current vote is excluded. The preferences of the excluded candidate is then distributed (based on next usable marked preference), at full value, and new candidate totals are counted (return to 3).

The count is complete if the number of candidates remaining is the same as remaining vacancies, at which time the remaining candidates are declared elected.

== See also ==
- Hare quota
