= Members of the Tasmanian House of Assembly, 1861–1862 =

This is a list of members of the Tasmanian House of Assembly between the 1861 elections and the 1862 elections.

Name	District	Years in office
Edward Abbott	Clarence	1856–1864
Robert Adams^{[2]}	Hobart Town	1859–1866
William Race Allison	Campbell Town	1856–1865
William Archer^{[5]}	Devon	1860–1862; 1866–1868
John Balfe	Franklin	1857–1872; 1874–1880
Henry Butler	Brighton	1856–1862; 1866–1885
Thomas Chapman	Queenborough	1856–1864; 1866–1873
John Crookes	Launceston	1857–1862; 1866
John Davies^{[1]}^{[5]}	Hobart Town; Devon	1861; 1862–1871
William Lambert Dobson	Hobart Town	1861–1862; 1864–1870
William Dodery	Norfolk Plains	1861–1870
Adye Douglas^{[4]}	Westbury	1856–1857; 1862–1884
Henry Dowling	Launceston	1861–1862
Thomas Field^{[4]}	Westbury	1856–1862
James Grant	Fingal	1861–1863
Thomas Gregson	Richmond	1856–1872
Charles Henty	George Town	1856–1862
Samuel Hill^{[2]}	Hobart Town	1861
William Hodgson	Sorell	1861–1881
Thomas Horne	Hobart Town	1861–1866
Frederick Innes	Morven	1856–1862; 1872–1877
Robert Kermode	Ringwood	1857–1859; 1861–1862
Douglas Kilburn^{[3]}	Hobart Town	1861–1862
James MacLanachan	Oatlands	1859–1862
Charles Meredith^{[1]}	Hobart Town	1856–1879
John Meredith	Glamorgan	1861–1863; 1865–1871
Maxwell Miller^{[3]}	Hobart Town	1856–1861; 1862–1864
Robert Miller	Launceston	1861–1867
Sir Robert Officer	Glenorchy	1856–1877
John Perkins	Kingborough	1861–1866
Adolphus Rooke	Deloraine	1856–1862; 1868–1869; 1871–1872
William Sharland	New Norfolk	1861–1872
Isaac Sherwin	Selby	1860–1866
Frederick Synnott	Cumberland	1861–1862

^{1} In October 1861, John Davies, one of the five members for Hobart Town, resigned. Charles Meredith won the resulting by-election on 28 October 1861.
^{2} On 23 October 1861, Samuel Hill, one of the five members for Hobart Town, died. Robert Adams won the resulting by-election on 4 November 1861.
^{3} In April 1862, Douglas Kilburn, one of the five members for Hobart Town, resigned. Maxwell Miller won the resulting by-election on 28 May 1862.
^{4} In April 1862, Thomas Field, the member for Westbury, resigned. Adye Douglas was elected unopposed on 30 May 1862.
^{5} In May 1862, William Archer, the member for Devon, resigned. John Davies was elected unopposed on 25 June 1862.

== Sources ==
- Newman, Terry (1994). Representation of the Tasmanian People. Tasmanian Parliamentary Library. ISBN 0-7246-4147-5.
- Parliament of Tasmania (2020). The Parliament of Tasmania from 1856
