= Members of the Tasmanian House of Assembly, 1862–1866 =

This is a list of members of the Tasmanian House of Assembly between the 1862 elections and the 1866 elections.

Name	District	Years in office
Edward Abbott^{[4]}	Clarence	1856–1864
Robert Adams	Hobart Town	1859–1866
William Race Allison^{[9]}	Hobart Town	1856–1865
John Balfe	Franklin	1857–1872; 1874–1880
Charles Cansdell^{[9]}	Hobart Town	1865–1866; 1867–1869
Thomas Chapman^{[6]}	Campbell Town	1856–1864; 1866–1873
Alexander Clerke^{[3]}	Ringwood	1857–1860; 1862–1863; 1872–1874
John Davies	Devon	1861; 1862–1871
Charles Degraves^{[5]}	Hobart Town	1864–1866
William Lambert Dobson^{[6]}	Campbell Town	1861–1862; 1864–1870
William Dodery	Norfolk Plains	1861–1870
Adye Douglas	Westbury	1856–1857; 1862–1884
Charles Grant^{[1]}	Deloraine	1863–1866
James Grant^{[2]}	Fingal	1861–1863
Thomas Gregson	Richmond	1856–1872
D'Arcy Haggitt^{[5]}	Hobart Town	1862–1864
John Hayes	Brighton	1862–1866
William Hodgson	Sorell	1861–1881
Alfred Horne^{[3]}^{[8]}	Ringwood	1863–1865
Thomas Horne	Hobart Town	1861–1866
Thomas John Knight^{[10]}	George Town	1862–1865
Henry Lette	Launceston	1862–1875; 1877–1892
David Lewis^{[4]}	Clarence	1864–1882
James Lord	Oatlands	1862–1871
John Lord^{[5]}	Hobart Town	1864–1871
Charles Meredith^{[M1]}	Glamorgan	1856–1879
John Meredith^{[1]}^{[8]}	Deloraine; Ringwood	1861–1863; 1865–1871
Maxwell Miller^{[5]}	Hobart Town	1856–1861; 1862–1864
Robert Byron Miller^{[M1]}	Launceston	1861–1867
D'Arcy Murray	Launceston	1862–1866
Sir Robert Officer	Glenorchy	1856–1877
John Perkins	Kingborough	1861–1866
Alexander Rose	Morven	1862–1866
John Scott^{[10]}	George Town	1865–1871
John Sharland^{[7]}	Cumberland	1862–1865
William Sharland	New Norfolk	1861–1872
Isaac Sherwin	Selby	1860–1866
William Sibley^{[7]}	Cumberland	1865–1871
John Swan^{[2]}	Fingal	1863–1875
Robert Walker	Queenborough	1862–1871

== Notes ==
^{M1} On 20 January 1863, James Whyte became Premier of Tasmania and appointed Charles Meredith and Robert Byron Miller to the Ministry. They were therefore required to resign and contest ministerial by-elections, at which they were both returned on 5 February 1863.
^{1} In March 1863, John Meredith, the member for Deloraine, resigned. Charles Grant won the resulting by-election on 18 May 1863.
^{2} In June 1863, James Grant, the member for Fingal, resigned. John Swan won the resulting by-election on 28 July 1863.
^{3} In September 1863, Alexander Clerke, the member for Ringwood, resigned. Alfred Horne won the resulting by-election on 24 November 1863.
^{4} In January 1864, Edward Abbott, the member for Clarence, resigned to successfully contest the Legislative Council division of Cambridge. David Lewis won the resulting by-election on 24 February 1864.
^{5} In May 1864, D'Arcy Haggitt and Maxwell Miller, both members of the five-member seat of Hobart Town, resigned. Miller had resigned to take up the role of Clerk-Assistant and Librarian of the Parliament of Tasmania. They were replaced on 1 June 1864 at a by-election by Charles Degraves and John Lord.
^{6} In May 1864, Thomas Chapman, the member for Campbell Town, resigned on account of personal bankruptcy. William Lambert Dobson was elected unopposed on 21 June 1864.
^{7} In May 1865, John Sharland, the member for Cumberland, resigned. William Sibley won the resulting by-election on 7 June 1865.
^{8} In May 1865, Alfred Horne, the member for Ringwood, resigned. At the resulting by-election on 26 June 1865, John Meredith was returned unopposed.
^{9} On 26 September 1865, William Race Allison, one of the five members for Hobart Town, died. Charles Cansdell won the resulting by-election on 17 October 1865.
^{10} In October 1865, Thomas Knight, the member for George Town, resigned. John Scott won the resulting by-election on 14 November 1865.

== Sources ==
- Newman, Terry (1994). Representation of the Tasmanian People. Tasmanian Parliamentary Library. ISBN 0-7246-4147-5.
- Parliament of Tasmania (2020). The Parliament of Tasmania from 1856
