= Members of the Tasmanian House of Assembly, 1866–1871 =

This is a list of members of the Tasmanian House of Assembly between the 1866 elections and the 1871 elections.

Name	District	Years in office
Robert Archer^{[7]}	Ringwood	1869–1871
William Archer^{[3]}	Deloraine	1860–1862; 1866–1868
John Balfe	Franklin	1857–1872; 1874–1880
William Barnes^{[8]}	George Town	1866–1869
Hugh Barrett^{[12]}	Hobart Town	1866–1871
Henry Butler^{[M2]}	Brighton	1856–1862; 1866–1885
Charles Cansdell^{[2]}^{[5]}	Hobart Town	1865–1866; 1867–1869
Thomas Chapman^{[M1]}	Hobart Town	1856–1864; 1866–1873
Henry Cook^{[5]}	Hobart Town	1869–1871
John Crookes^{[M1]}	Launceston	1857–1862; 1866
William Crowther^{[1]}	Hobart Town	1866
John Davies	Devon	1861; 1862–1871
William Lambert Dobson^{[M1]}^{[9]}	Campbell Town	1861–1862; 1864–1870
William Dodery^{[10]}	Norfolk Plains	1861–1870
Adye Douglas	Westbury	1856–1857; 1862–1884
Henry Douglas^{[3]}	Deloraine	1869–1871
William Giblin^{[4]}^{[M3]}	Hobart Town	1869–1885
George Gibson^{[7]}	Ringwood	1866–1869
John Gleadow^{[6]}	Morven	1866–1869
Thomas Gregson	Richmond	1856–1872
William Hodgson	Sorell	1861–1881
George Keach^{[9]}	Campbell Town	1870–1882
Henry Lette	Launceston	1862–1875; 1877–1892
David Lewis	Clarence	1864–1882
James Lord	Oatlands	1862–1871
John Lord^{[M1]}	Hobart Town	1864–1871
Charles Meredith	Kingborough	1856–1879
John Meredith^{[13]}	Glamorgan	1861–1863; 1865–1871
Robert Byron Miller^{[2]}	Hobart Town	1861–1867
Sir Robert Officer	Glenorchy	1856–1877
Josiah Pratt^{[1]}^{[11]}	Hobart Town	1867–1870
Charles Rocher^{[10]}	Norfolk Plains	1870–1872
James Scott^{[8]}	George Town	1869–1877; 1878–1884
James Reid Scott	Selby	1866–1872
George Salier^{[4]}^{[11]}	Hobart Town	1866–1869; 1870–1886
John Scott	Launceston	1865–1871
William Sharland	New Norfolk	1861–1872
Edward Shaw^{[13]}	Glamorgan	1871
William Sibley	Cumberland	1865–1871
John Swan^{[2]}	Fingal	1863–1875
Robert Walker	Queenborough	1862–1871
John Whitehead^{[6]}	Morven	1869–1880
Russell Young^{[12]}	Hobart Town	1871; 1872–1877

== Notes ==
^{1} In December 1866, William Crowther, one of the five members for Hobart Town, resigned. Josiah Pratt won the resulting by-election on 2 January 1867.
^{2} In July 1867, Robert Byron Miller, one of the five members for Hobart Town, resigned. Charles Cansdell won the resulting by-election on 19 August 1867.
^{3} In January 1869, William Archer, the member for Deloraine, resigned. Henry Douglas was elected unopposed on 12 February 1869.
^{4} In February 1869, George Salier, one of the five members for Hobart Town, resigned. William Giblin won the resulting by-election on 24 March 1869.
^{5} In May 1869, Charles Cansdell, one of the five members for Hobart Town, resigned. Henry Cook won the resulting by-election on 22 June 1869.
^{6} In June 1869, John Gleadow, the member for Morven, resigned. John Whitehead was elected unopposed on 1 July 1869.
^{7} In June 1869, George Gibson, the member for Ringwood, resigned. Robert Archer won the resulting by-election on 6 July 1869.
^{8} In June 1869, William Barnes, the member for George Town, resigned. James Scott was elected unopposed on 15 July 1869.
^{9} In February 1870, William Lambert Dobson, the member for Campbell Town, resigned. George Keach won the resulting by-election on 10 March 1870.
^{10} In July 1870, William Dodery, the member for Norfolk Plains, resigned. Charles Rocher won the resulting by-election on 8 August 1870.
^{11} In October 1870, Josiah Pratt, one of the five members for Hobart Town, resigned. George Salier won the resulting by-election on 28 November 1870.
^{12} On 26 January 1871, Hugh Barrett, one of the five members for Hobart Town, died. Russell Young won the resulting by-election on 27 February 1871.
^{13} In March 1871, John Meredith, the member for Glamorgan, resigned. Edward Shaw won the resulting by-election on 11 April 1871.

Ministerial by-elections

^{M1} On 24 November 1866, William Lambert Dobson was appointed to the Ministry by the new Premier of Tasmania, Richard Dry, and was therefore required to resign and contest a ministerial by-election, at which he was returned unopposed on 4 December 1866. Not so fortunate was Colonial Treasurer Thomas Chapman, one of the five members for Hobart Town, who was defeated by John Lord on 3 December 1866. John Crookes resigned his Launceston seat, which Chapman won at the resulting by-election on 31 December 1866.
^{M2} On 27 October 1869, James Milne Wilson appointed Henry Butler to the Ministry. He was returned unopposed at the resulting ministerial by-election on 8 November 1869.
^{M3} On 5 February 1870, James Milne Wilson appointed William Giblin to the Ministry. He was returned unopposed at the resulting ministerial by-election on 14 February 1870.

== Sources ==
- Newman, Terry (1994). Representation of the Tasmanian People. Tasmanian Parliamentary Library. ISBN 0-7246-4147-5.
- Parliament of Tasmania (2020). The Parliament of Tasmania from 1856
