= Members of the Tasmanian Legislative Council, 1885–1891 =

This is a list of members of the Tasmanian Legislative Council between 1885 and 1891. Terms of the Legislative Council did not coincide with Legislative Assembly elections, and members served six-year terms, with a number of members facing election each year.

== Elections ==
Date	Electorates
4 May 1885	Cambridge; Hobart (1)
? May 1886	Hobart (1); Launceston (1); North Esk
? May 1887	Hobart (1); Meander; Pembroke
8 May 1888	Huon; Launceston (1); Mersey
7 May 1889	Derwent; Tamar; Westmorland
6 May 1890	Buckingham; Macquarie; South Esk

== Members ==
Name	Division	Years in office	Elected
Hon Dr James Agnew^{[7]}	Jordan; Macquarie^{[2]}	1877–1881; 1884–1887	1884
Hon James Aikenhead^{[3]}	Tamar	1870–1885	1882
Hon Donald Cameron	North Esk	1868–1886	1880
Hon Audley Coote^{[5]}	Tamar	1886–1895	1889
Hon William Crosby	Hobart	1885–1909	1885
Hon William Dodery	Longford; Westmorland^{[2]}	1877–1907	1889
Hon Adye Douglas^{[4]}^{[9]}	South Esk; Launceston	1855–1856; 1884–1886; 1890–1904	1885
Hon Philip Fysh	Buckingham	1866–1869; 1870–1873; 1884–1894	1890
Hon Walter Gellibrand	Derwent	1871–1901	1889
Hon James Gibson^{[4]}	South Esk	1886–1899	1890
Hon Frederick Grubb	Meander	1879–1911	1887
Hon William Hart^{[3]}	Launceston	1885–1904	1888
Hon William Hodgson^{[10]}	Pembroke	1881–1891	1887
Hon Henry Lamb^{[10]}	Pembroke	1891–1899	b/e
Hon Alfred Lord^{[8]}	Cambridge	1890–1897	1891
Hon John Lord^{[8]}	Cambridge	1873–1890	1885
Hon John Hair McCall	Mersey	1888–1901	1888
Hon Alexander McGregor	Hobart	1880–1896	1886
Hon William Moore^{[1]}	Mersey; Russell	1877–1909	1885
Hon Alfred Page^{[7]}	Macquarie	1887–1909	1890
Hon Henry Rooke	North Esk	1886–1901	1886
Hon George Salier^{[6]}	Hobart	1886–1892	1887
Hon John Scott^{[5]}^{[9]}	Tamar; Launceston^{[2]}	1880–1890	1885
Hon Dr Thomas Smart^{[6]}	Hobart	1881–1886	1881
Hon James Smith^{[1]}	Mersey	1885–1888	b/e
Hon John Watchorn	Huon	1882–1905	1888

== Notes ==
^{1} On 20 November 1885, following the creation of the seat of Russell in north-western Tasmania, William Moore, the member for Mersey, transferred to the seat. His old seat was filled by James Smith.
^{2} In December 1885, a redistribution of the Council occurred.

- The Longford division was renamed Westmorland. The member for Longford, William Dodery, was unaffected.
- The Jordan division was abolished and largely recreated as Macquarie; the member for Jordan, James Agnew, was required to stand for an extraordinary election on 18 February 1886, at which he was reelected.
- A new two-member division of Launceston was created while Tamar changed from a two-member to a single-member division.

^{3} When the second seat in Tamar was abolished, the incumbent, James Aikenhead, retired. At the resulting Launceston by-election on 21 December 1895, William Hart was elected.
^{4} In February 1886, Adye Douglas, the member for South Esk, resigned. James Gibson won the resulting by-election on 26 March 1886.
^{5} An extraordinary election for the second Launceston seat was declared for 13 July 1886. Tamar MHA John Scott resigned to contest it, and hence by-elections for both Tamar and Launceston were required. Scott was elected in Launceston, whilst Audley Coote was elected in Tamar.
^{6} In January 1886, Thomas Smart, one of the three members for Hobart, resigned. George Salier won the resulting by-election on 8 February 1886.
^{7} Shortly after his Government's defeat on 29 March 1887, the Premier of Tasmania and member for Macquarie, James Agnew, retired from politics. Alfred Page won the resulting by-election on 26 July 1887.
^{8} On 13 January 1890, John Lord, the member for Cambridge, died. Alfred Lord was elected unopposed on 29 January 1890.
^{9} On 3 June 1890, John Scott, one of the two members for Launceston, died. Sir Adye Douglas was elected unopposed on 17 June 1890.
^{10} On 19 March 1891, William Hodgson, the member for Pembroke, died. Henry Lamb won the resulting by-election on 14 April 1891.

== Sources ==
- Hughes, Colin A.; Aitkin, Don (1986). Voting for the Australian State Upper Houses, 1890-1984. Canberra: Australian National University. ISBN 0-9097-7918-X.
- Parliament of Tasmania (2006). The Parliament of Tasmania from 1856
