= George Salier =

Australian politician

Member of the Tasmanian House of Assembly for Hobart Town
- In office 27 October 1866 – March 1869
- Preceded by: Adams/Cansdell/Degraves/Horne/Lord
- Succeeded by: William Giblin
- In office November 1870 – September 1871
- Preceded by: Josiah Pratt
- Succeeded by: Abolished

Member of the Tasmanian House of Assembly for North Hobart
- In office 6 September 1871 – February 1886
- Preceded by: New seat
- Succeeded by: Alfred Crisp/Windle St Hill

Member of the Tasmanian Legislative Council for Hobart
- In office 8 February 1886 – 11 June 1892
- Preceded by: Thomas Smart
- Succeeded by: Charles Grant

Personal details
- Born: 1813
- Died: 11 June 1892 (aged 78–79) Hobart, Tasmania

George Salier (1813 – 11 June 1892) was an Australian politician.

Salier was born in 1813. He arrived in Tasmania in 1839 and went on to be a prominent merchant, shipowner and whaler.

He owned four ships that made 30 whaling voyages from Hobart between 1868 and 1888.

In 1866 he was elected to the Tasmanian House of Assembly, representing the seat of Hobart Town. He resigned in 1869, was re-elected in 1870 and transferred to the new seat of North Hobart in 1871. In 1886 he moved to the Tasmanian Legislative Council, representing the seat of Hobart until his death in Hobart in 1892.

Tasmanian House of Assembly
Preceded by Robert Adams; Charles Cansdell; Charles Degraves; Thomas Horne; John Lord	Member for Hobart Town; 1866–1869; Served alongside: Barrett, Chapman/Lord, Crowther/Pratt, Miller/Cansdell	Succeeded by William Giblin
Preceded by Josiah Pratt	Member for Hobart Town; 1870–1871; Served alongside: Barrett/Young, Cook, Giblin, Lord	Abolished
New seat	Member for North Hobart; 1871–1886	Succeeded by Alfred Crisp; Windle St Hill
Tasmanian Legislative Council
Preceded by Thomas Smart	Member for Hobart; 1886–1892; Served alongside: Crosby, McGregor	Succeeded by Charles Grant
