= Electoral district of Hobart Town =

Former electoral district of the Tasmanian House of Assembly

The electoral district of Hobart Town was a multi-member electoral district of the Tasmanian House of Assembly. It was based in Tasmania's capital city, Hobart, and its suburbs.

The seat was created as a five-member seat ahead of the Assembly's first election held in 1856, and was abolished at the 1871 election, when it was divided up into the seats of Central, East, North, South and West Hobart.

The seat was later recombined in 1897 as the seat of Hobart.

== Members for Hobart Town ==
Member 1	Term	Member 2	Term	Member 3	Term	Member 4	Term	Member 5	Term
Thomas Chapman	1856–1861	Maxwell Miller	1856–1861	Francis Smith	1856–1857	Robert Nutt	1856–1859	James Dunn	1856–1861
Thomas Chapman	1856–1861	Maxwell Miller	1856–1861	William Boys	1857–1861	Robert Adams	1859–1861	James Dunn	1856–1861
John Davies	1861–1861	William Dobson	1861–1862	Thomas Horne	1861–1866	Samuel Hill	1861–1861	Douglas Kilburn	1861–1862
Charles Meredith	1861–1862	William Dobson	1861–1862	Thomas Horne	1861–1866	Robert Adams	1861–1866	Douglas Kilburn	1861–1862
William Race Allison	1862–1865	Maxwell Miller	1862–1864	Thomas Horne	1861–1866	Robert Adams	1861–1866	D'Arcy Haggitt	1862–1864
Charles Cansdell	1865–1866	Charles Degraves	1864–1866	Thomas Horne	1861–1866	Robert Adams	1861–1866	John Lord	1864–1866
William Crowther	1866–1866	Thomas Chapman	1866–1866	Robert Miller	1866–1867	Hugh Barrett	1866–1871	George Salier	1866–1869
Josiah Pratt	1867–1870	John Lord	1867–1871	Charles Cansdell	1867–1869	Hugh Barrett	1866–1871	George Salier	1866–1869
George Salier	1870–1871	John Lord	1867–1871	Henry Cook	1869–1871	Russell Young	1871–1871	William Giblin	1869–1871
