= Attorney General Dobson =

Attorney General Dobson may refer to:

- Alfred Dobson (Australian politician) (1849–1908), Attorney-General of Tasmania
- William Lambert Dobson (1833–1898), Attorney-General of Tasmania
