= John Hamilton (Tasmanian politician) =

Australian politician

Member of the Tasmanian House of Assembly for Glenorchy
- In office 20 June 1887 – 2 April 1903
- Preceded by: Alfred Dobson
- Succeeded by: Frederick Rattle

Personal details
- Born: John Hamilton; 11 July 1834 Hobart, Van Diemen's Land
- Died: 17 August 1924 (aged 90) Hobart, Tasmania
- Domestic partner: Ellen Morgan (m. 1861)

John Hamilton (11 July 1834 – 17 August 1924) was an Australian politician.

Hamilton was born in Hobart in 1834, to William Hamilton and Mary Anne Wilson, who had arrived in Van Diemen's Land from Ireland in 1832. He studied at The Hutchins School before being apprenticed to a merchant. He later established his own business, John Hamilton & Co. In 1887 he was elected to the Tasmanian House of Assembly, representing the seat of Glenorchy. He served until his defeat in 1903. He died in 1924 in Hobart.

Tasmanian House of Assembly
Preceded by Alfred Dobson	Member for Glenorchy; 1887–1903	Succeeded by Frederick Rattle
