= Attorney-General of Tasmania =

Chief law officer for the state of Tasmania, Australia

- Tasmanian Coat of arms

- Flag of Tasmania

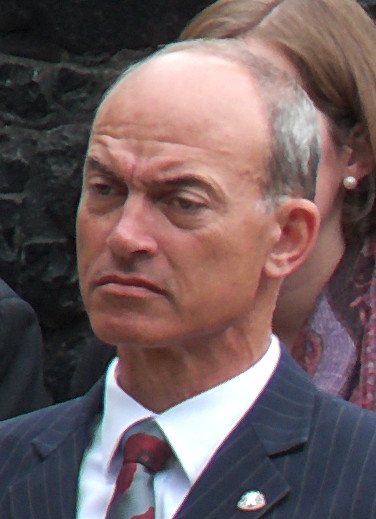
- Incumbent; Guy Barnett since 2 October 2023
- Department of Justice
- Style: The Honourable
- Member of: Parliament; Cabinet; Executive Council
- Reports to: Premier of Tasmania
- Seat: Executive Building; 15 Murray Street, Hobart
- Nominator: Premier of Tasmania
- Appointer: Governor of Tasmania; on the advice of the premier
- Term length: At the governor's pleasure
- Formation: 1 August 1823
- First holder: Joseph Gellibrand
- Website: www.justice.tas.gov.au

The attorney general of Tasmania, known simply as the attorney general, is a minister in the Government of Tasmania who has responsibility for the administration of justice in Tasmania, Australia. In addition, the attorney general is one of the Law Officers of the Crown. The attorney-general serves as the chief legal and constitutional adviser of the Crown and Government of Tasmania. The position is not directly elected, and instead is chosen by the premier and appointed by the governor.

The office was created by warrant on 1 August 1823 for the colony of Van Diemen's Land, which was renamed Tasmania in 1856. The inaugural holder Joseph Gellibrand was sworn in to the post on 7 May 1824.

The current attorney-general of Tasmania, since 2 October 2023, is Guy Barnett of the Liberal Party.

== List of attorneys-general of Tasmania ==
=== Under direct rule, 1830–1856 ===
Ordinal	Attorney General	Term begin	Term end
1	Joseph Gellibrand	1824	1826
–	Joseph Hone (acting)	1826	1828
2	Algernon Montagu	1830	1833
–	Thomas Macdowell (acting)	1833	1834
3	Alfred Stephen	1834	1839
4	Edward Macdowell	1839	1842
5	Thomas Welsh	1842	1843
6	Thomas Horne (acting until 1844)	1843	1848
7	Valentine Fleming	1848	1854
8	Francis Smith	1854	1856

=== Under responsible government, 1856–present ===
Ordinal	Attorney General	Party	Term begin	Term end
1	Francis Smith	Not a member of Legislative Council	1 November 1856	26 February 1857
2	John Gregson	Prior to formal political parties	26 February 1857	25 April 1857
–	Francis Smith	Prior to formal political parties	25 April 1857	1 November 1860
3	Thomas John Knight	Prior to formal political parties	1 November 1860	4 February 1861
4	William Lambert Dobson	Prior to formal political parties	5 February 1861	20 January 1863
5	Robert Byron Miller	Prior to formal political parties	20 January 1863	24 November 1866
–	William Lambert Dobson	Prior to formal political parties	24 November 1866	5 February 1870
6	William Giblin	Prior to formal political parties	5 February 1870	4 November 1872
7	John Alexander Jackson	Prior to formal political parties	4 November 1872	4 April 1873
–	William Giblin	Prior to formal political parties	4 August 1873	20 July 1876
8	Charles Hamilton Bromby	Prior to formal political parties	20 July 1876	9 August 1877
–	William Giblin	Prior to formal political parties	9 August 1877	13 August 1877
9	Alfred Dobson	Prior to formal political parties	13 August 1877	10 December 1878
10	John Stokell Dodds	Prior to formal political parties	20 December 1878	1 December 1881
–	William Giblin	Prior to formal political parties	1 December 1881	5 August 1884
–	John Stokell Dodds	Prior to formal political parties	15 August 1884	15 February 1887
11	Richard Lucas	Prior to formal political parties	25 February 1887	29 March 1887
12	Andrew Inglis Clark	Prior to formal political parties	30 March 1887	17 August 1892
13	Elliott Lewis	Prior to formal political parties	17 August 1892	14 April 1894
–	Andrew Inglis Clark	Prior to formal political parties	14 April 1894	23 October 1897
14	Don Urquhart	Prior to formal political parties	10 November 1897	12 October 1899
–	Elliott Lewis	Independent Conservative	12 October 1899	8 April 1903
15	Herbert Nicholls	Independent	9 April 1903	11 June 1904
16	William Propsting	Liberal Democratic	1 May 1906	19 June 1909
17	Albert Solomon	Liberal	19 June 1909	20 October 1909
18	John Earle	Labor	20 October 1909	27 October 1909
–	Albert Solomon	Liberal	27 October 1909	6 February 1914
–	John Earle	Labor	6 April 1916	14 April 1916
–	William Propsting	Liberal Democratic	15 April 1916	14 August 1923
19	Alexander Hean	Nationalist	14 August 1923	25 October 1923
20	Albert Ogilvie	Labor	25 October 1923	15 June 1928
21	Henry Baker	Nationalist	15 June 1928	22 June 1934
22	Eric Ogilvie	Labor	22 June 1934	19 August 1940
22	James McDonald	Labor	August 1940	December 1946
23	Roy Fagan	Labor	10 December 1946	19 July 1958
24	Bill Neilson	Labor	22 July 1958	28 October 1958
25	Eric Reece	Labor	28 October 1958	12 May 1959
–	Roy Fagan	Labor	12 May 1959	26 May 1969
26	Max Bingham	Liberal	26 May 1969	3 May 1972
27	Merv Everett	Labor	3 May 1972	1 August 1972
–	Eric Reece	Labor	2 August 1972	21 August 1972
–	Merv Everett	Labor	21 August 1974	12 April 1974
–	Bill Neilson	Labor	12 April 1974	31 March 1975
29	Brian Kirkwall Miller	Labor	31 March 1974	26 May 1982
–	Max Bingham	Liberal	27 May 1982	13 June 1984
30	Geoff Pearsall	Liberal	14 June 1984	19 February 1986
31	John Bennett	Liberal	19 February 1986	29 June 1989
32	Peter Patmore	Labor	3 July 1989	17 February 1992
33	Ray Groom	Liberal	17 February 1992	18 February 1992
34	Ron Cornish	Liberal	18 February 1992	18 March 1996
35	Sue Napier	Liberal	18 March 1996	21 March 1996
–	Ray Groom	Liberal	21 March 1996	14 September 1998
36	Paul Lennon	Labor	14 September 1998	18 September 1998
–	Peter Patmore	Labor	18 September 1998	20 July 2002
37	Judy Jackson	Labor	9 August 2002	5 April 2006
38	Steve Kons	Labor	5 April 2006	12 February 2008
39	David Llewellyn	Labor	12 February 2008	17 September 2008
40	Lara Giddings	Labor	17 September 2008	24 January 2011
41	David Bartlett	Labor	24 January 2011	13 May 2011
42	Brian Wightman	Labor	13 May 2011	31 March 2014
43	Vanessa Goodwin	Liberal	31 March 2014	2 October 2017
44	Will Hodgman	Liberal	2 October 2017	21 March 2018
45	Elise Archer	Liberal	21 March 2018	28 September 2023
46	Guy Barnett	Liberal	2 October 2023	Present

== See also ==
- Justice ministry
- Government of Tasmania
