= Thomas Smart =

Thomas Smart may refer to:

- Thomas Smart (New South Wales politician) (1810–1881), colonial treasurer in the 1860s
- Thomas Smart (Tasmanian politician) (1816–1896), member of the Tasmanian Legislative Council in the 1880s
