= Henry Rooke =

Australian politician

Hon. Henry Isidore Joachim Raphael Rooke (1841 – 28 November 1901), was a colonial merchant and politician in the colony of Tasmania.

== Early life ==
Rooke was born in Spain in 1841, the son of Colonel Benjamin Henry Rooke of the English Legion, who fought all through the Carlist war. His father also was in the Imperial service, and served in the Spanish army. His mother, Maria del Carmen Rooke, was of Spanish extraction. He was educated in London, and came to Tasmania with his parents when 16 years of age. After spending some years in the country he went to Launceston, and started business as merchant and importer, one of the principals of the firm of Rooke and Maddox.

== Political career ==
Rooke entered the Tasmanian House of Assembly as the member for Deloraine on 25 May 1882, and in 1896 was returned for North Esk in the Tasmanian Legislative Council in July, 1886 which he held until his death having been re-elected each time without opposition. For a short period he held office as Chief Secretary from 1–29 March 1887 in James Agnew's Administration. It is reported that he contributed materially towards brightening the debates by animated speeches, largely commingled of shrewdness, grasp of facts, and a caustic wit that had nothing spiteful about it. He was a member of the Executive Council, a magistrate of the territory, and visiting justice of the Gaol at Launceston. He was connected with local sporting institutions, was a steward of the Tasmanian Turf Club, and president of a number of athletic clubs He had always taken a deep interest in the volunteer movement, held the long service medal and was captain and paymaster of the Launceston Rifle Corp.

== Family and death ==
Rooke married twice, firstly to Maria Louisa Ferguson, in 1880, and secondly, in 1892, to his cousin Emma Rooke, daughter of Adolphus Rooke. He died on 28 November 1901, in Launceston.

Tasmanian House of Assembly
Preceded by William Sleigh	Member for Deloraine; 1882–1886	Succeeded by John Hart
Tasmanian Legislative Council
Preceded by Donald Cameron	Member for North Esk; 1886–1901	Abolished
