= Alfred Douglas (disambiguation) =

Lord Alfred Douglas was a writer.

Alfred Douglas may also refer to:

- Alfred Douglas (cricketer) (1872–1938), Australian cricketer
- Alfred Douglas (footballer) (1899–?), English football winger

== See also ==
- Alfred Douglas-Hamilton
