= Electoral district of North Hobart =

Colonial electoral district of Tasmania (1871–1897)

The electoral district of North Hobart, sometimes referred to as Hobart North, was an electoral district of the Tasmanian House of Assembly. It was based in Tasmania's capital city, Hobart.

The seat was created as a single-member seat ahead of the 1871 election following the dissolution of the multi-member Hobart Town seat. In 1886, it became a two-member seat, and at the 1897 election, it was abolished when the seat of Hobart was created under a trial of the Hare-Clark model.

The seat was then recreated as a single-member seat at the 1903 election and was abolished when the Tasmanian parliament adopted the Hare-Clark electoral model for the entire state in 1909.

== Members for North Hobart ==
First incarnation: 1871–1897

Member 1	Term	Member 2	Term
George Salier	1871–1886		
Alfred Crisp	1886–1897	Windle St Hill	1886–1893
Alfred Crisp	1886–1897	Frederick William Piesse	1893–1894
Alfred Crisp	1886–1897	Sir Philip Fysh	1894–1897

Second incarnation: 1903–1909

Member	Party	Term
William Propsting	Opposition	1903–1906
Walter Woods	Labor	1906–1909
