= Thomas John Knight =

English politician (born 1804)

Thomas John Knight QC (1 November 1804 – 25 April 1870) was an English politician who served as Solicitor-General and Attorney-General of Tasmania He also represented the electorate of Huon in the Legislative Council of Tasmania and the electorate of George Town in the Tasmanian House of Assembly.

Knight was born in Birlingham, Worcestershire, England and earned a Master of Arts at the University of Cambridge. He died while on leave from home in Richmond, England. He was married to Margaret Kingston who died on 16 August 1899 in their home at Battery Point, after being a widow for nearly 30 years. Together they had two known children, Amelia Elizabeth and Henry Palmer.
