= William Douglas (cricketer, born 1848) =

New Zealand cricketer

Personal information
- Born: 6 June 1848; Longford, Van Diemen's Land
- Died: 7 September 1887 (aged 39); Gore, Southland, New Zealand
- Relatives: Adye Douglas (uncle)

Domestic team information
- Years: Team
- 1878/79: Otago
- Only FC: 10 February 1879 Otago v Canterbury
- Source: CricketArchive, 8 May 2016

William Douglas (6 June 1848 – 7 September 1887) was a New Zealand cricketer. He played one first-class match for Otago during the 1878–79 season.

Douglas was born at Longford in what was at that point still Van Diemen's Land in 1848 and was educated at Horton College on the island. His father, Roddam Douglas, was born in England at Fareham in Hampshire in 1817 and his uncle, Adye Douglas was Premier of the Colony of Tasmania. Douglas is known to have played cricket in Tasmania towards the end of the 1860s, and both his father and brother, Onslow Douglas, also played cricket in the colony.

A leading member of Albion Cricket Club in Dunedin, and later captain of Gore Cricket Club, Douglas played for Otago against a touring Australian side in January 1878 and made his only first-class appearance during the following season in a provincial representative match against Canterbury―the only match played in New Zealand during the season which is considered to hold first-class status. He was out first ball in both of his innings, recording a king pair.

Douglas had moved to New Zealand during the 1870s, initially working for the government Railway Department. He was the agent and later manager for the New Zealand Loan and Mercantile Agency Company at Gore in the Southland Region of New Zealand from 1882. He died there in 1887 from syncope aged 39, leaving a wife and a daughter.
