= Osborne Douglas =

Australian cricketer

Personal information
- Full name: Osborne Henry Douglas
- Born: 14 March 1880; Launceston, Tasmania, Australia
- Died: 24 April 1918 (aged 38); Albert, France
- Batting: Left-handed
- Role: Batsman
- Relatives: Adye Douglas (father)

Domestic team information
- Years: Team
- 1898–1905: Tasmania
- Source: Cricinfo, 16 January 2016

Osborne Henry Douglas (14 March 1880 – 24 April 1918) was an Australian cricketer. He was killed in action during World War I.

Douglas was born in Launceston, the son of Sir Adye Douglas, who was Premier of Tasmania from 1884 to 1886. He was educated at The Hutchins School in Hobart before attending the University of Tasmania, where he graduated with a law degree. He practised as a solicitor in Melbourne before buying a practice in Nhill, in western Victoria, in 1909. He took part in the life of the town to such an extent that he "was a member of every institution and sporting club in Nhill", and on top of his private practice he was appointed shire solicitor.

A left-handed batsman, strong in defence, Douglas played seven first-class matches for Tasmania between 1898 and 1905. His highest score was 59 against the touring English team in 1903–04, when he added 202 for the first wicket with John Savigny after Tasmania had trailed by 212 runs on the first innings.

Douglas enlisted for the war in 1916. He was wounded in 1917 and spent time in hospital before returning to the front, where he was killed in action at Dernancourt in April 1918, aged 38.

== See also ==
- List of cricketers who were killed during military service
