= William Edward Kilburn =

English photographer

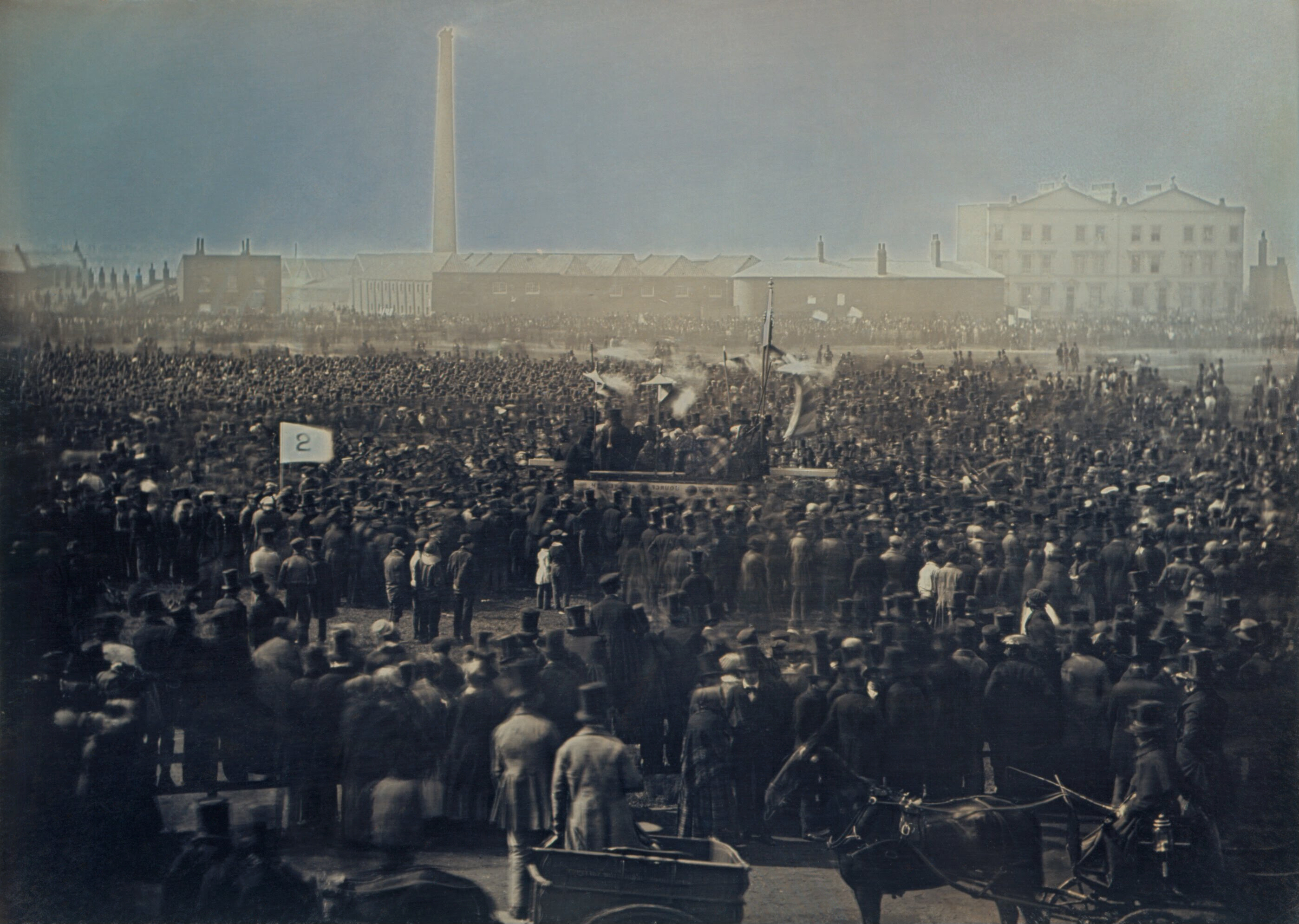
The Great Chartist Meeting on Kennington Common, London in 1848 by William Edward Kilburn

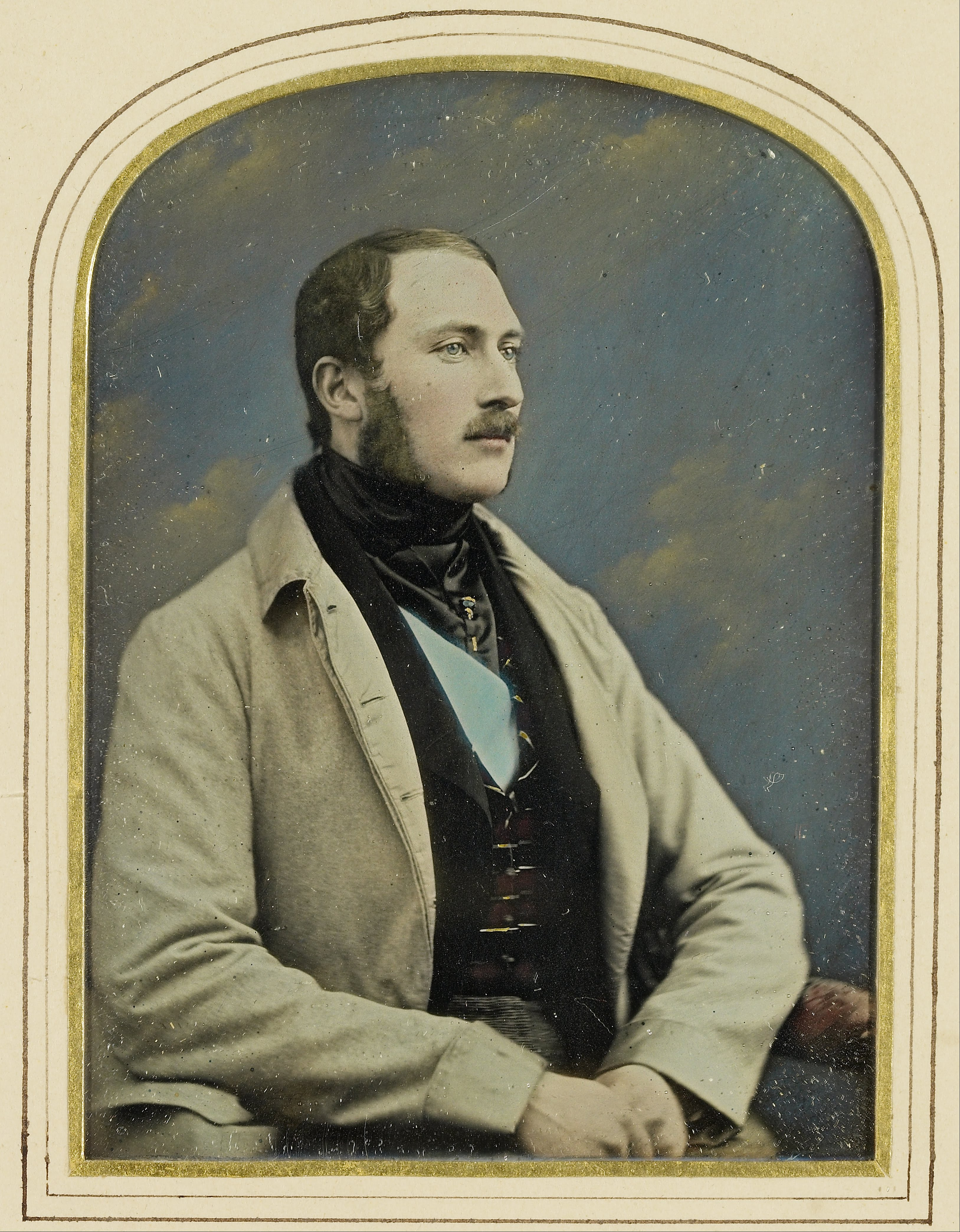
Prince Albert (1848) by Kilburn

William Edward Kilburn (28 November 1818 – 11 December 1891) was an English photographer, noted for his pictures of the British Royal family.

Kilburn photographed the large Chartist rally at Kennington Common on 10 April 1848; this was one of the earliest photographs of a large crowd scene. Kilburn's photograph of the Kennington Chartist rally was rediscovered in the British Royal Collection in the 1980s after being thought lost.

Kilburn's photographs of the event were appreciated by Prince Albert who appointed Kilburn "Photographist to Her Majesty and His Royal Highness Prince Albert". Kilburn made the first daguerreotype portraits of Queen Victoria and her family in April 1847.

Kilburn's studio was at 234 Regent Street, from where he produced his daguerreotypes.

Kilburn’s brother Douglas produced in Melbourne what are arguably the earliest daguerreotypes of Australian indigenous people.
