= John Hart (Tasmanian politician) =

Australian politician

Member of the Tasmanian House of Assembly for Deloraine
- In office 26 July 1886 – December 1893
- Preceded by: Henry Rooke
- Succeeded by: Norman Cameron

Personal details
- Born: 1826 London, England
- Died: 8 September 1896 (aged 69–70) Deloraine, Tasmania

John Hart (1829 – 8 September 1896) was an Australian politician.

Hart was born in London in 1826. In 1886 he was elected to the Tasmanian House of Assembly, representing the seat of Deloraine. He served until his defeat in 1893. He died in 1896 in Deloraine.

Tasmanian House of Assembly
Preceded by Henry Rooke	Member for Deloraine; 1886–1893	Succeeded by Norman Cameron
