= Electoral division of North Esk =

Former electoral district of Tasmania

The Electoral division of North Esk was an electoral division in the Tasmanian Legislative Council of Australia. It existed from 1855 to 1901, when it was abolished.

== Members ==
Member	Party	Period
John Wedge	Independent	1855–1860
William Gibson	Independent	1860–1864
Robert Kermode	Independent	1864–1868
Donald Cameron	Independent	1868–1886
Henry Rooke	Independent	1886–1901

== See also ==
- Tasmanian Legislative Council electoral divisions
