= Donald Cameron (Tasmanian politician) =

Australian politician

Donald Cameron (1 August 1814 – 1 November 1890) born in Fordoun, Scotland was a Tasmanian politician who held the Tasmanian Legislative Council seat of North Esk from 18 July 1868 to 13 July 1886.

He was the second son of Donald Cameron (1780–1857), a Scottish surgeon who was granted a 1,000 acres (400 ha) allotment near Launceston as an incentive to relocate in Van Diemens Land.

By 1840 he was virtually manager of this farm which his father had named 'Fordon'. From 1844 to 1848 he toured Europe and Great Britain and by the time he returned to Australia he had married Mary Isabella Morrison from Stirling. The farm prospered, allowing him to represent the area in the Tasmanian parliament. His wife survived him and continued to run the property for the next twenty three years.

He was father of Donald Norman Cameron (MHR for Tasmania 1901–1903, MHA 1904–1906) and Cyril St Clair Cameron (Senator for Tasmania 1901–1903) and grandfather of Donald Keith Cameron (MHA 1934–1937).

Tasmanian Legislative Council
Preceded by Robert Kermode	Member for North Esk; 1868–1886	Succeeded by Henry Rooke
