= Windle St Hill =

Australian politician

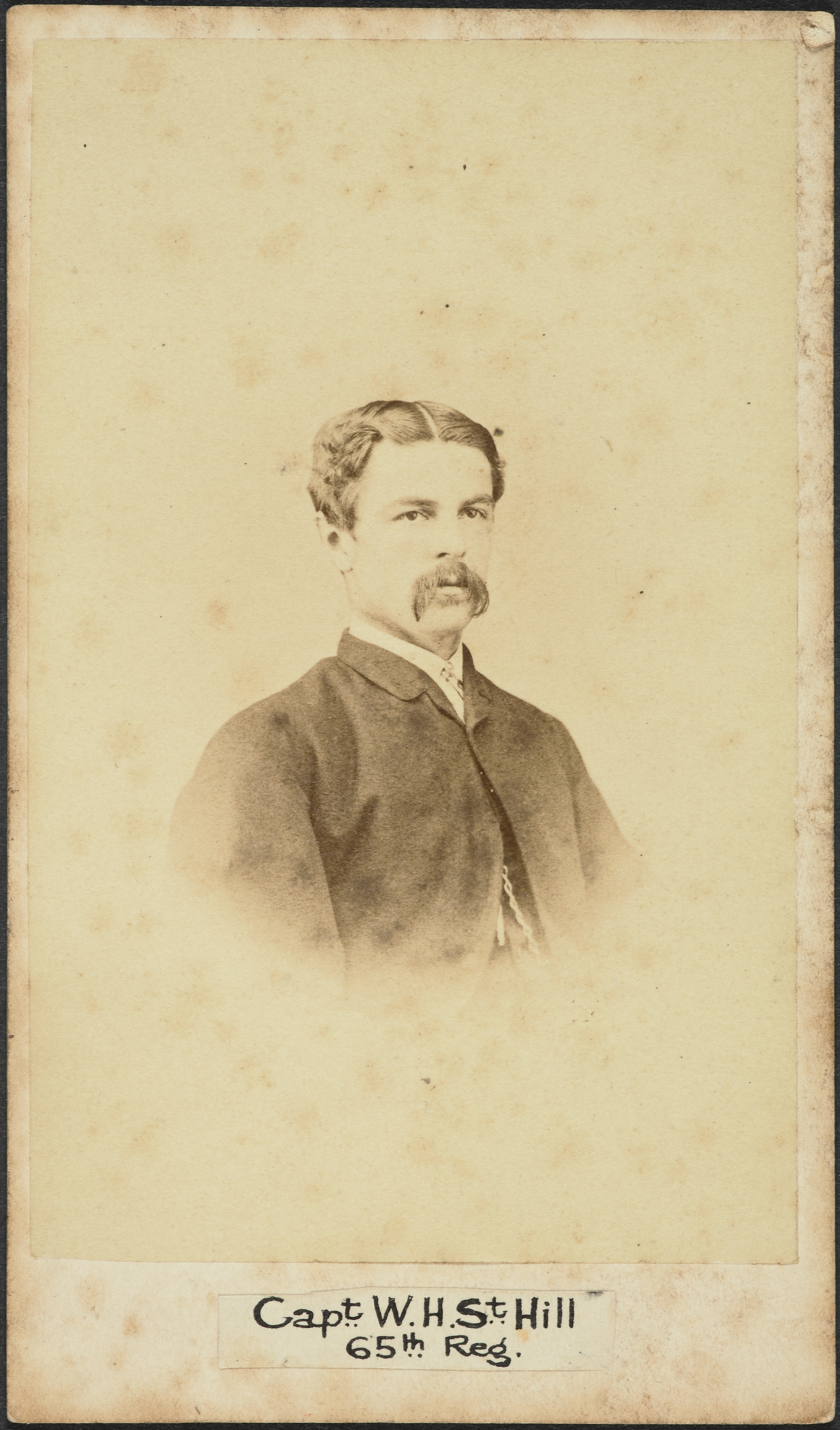
Captain Windle St Hill in New Zealand in 1860

Lieutenant-Colonel Windle Hill St. Hill (11 July 1839 – 31 May 1918) was an English army officer and politician in colonial Tasmania, member of the Tasmanian House of Assembly.

St Hill was born in Saint-Omer, France. St Hill entered the army in February 1858, became captain in June 1867, brevet lieut.-colonel in June 1876, and retired from the army (19th Foot) in August 1881. Colonel St. Hill served with distinction in the New Zealand Wars from 1860 to 1865, and for his gallant services was mentioned in despatches, received the war medal, and was promoted to brevet-major. He was private secretary to Sir Frederick Weld when Governor of Tasmania for two years, and was commandant of the local forces of that colony from June 1878 to May 1880. He was a member for North Hobart in the House of Assembly from July 1886 to December 1893. St Hill died in Hobart, Tasmania.
