= Alfred Dobson (politician) =

Australian politician

Sir Alfred Dobson CMG KC (18 August 1849 – 5 December 1908) was a Solicitor-General and Attorney-General of Tasmania.

== Early life ==
Dobson was the sixth son of John Dobson, of Hobart, Tasmania, solicitor and public notary, and previously of Gateshead, Durham, England, by his second wife Kate, daughter of the late Richard Willis, member of the Tasmanian Legislative Council. Dobson was full brother to Henry Dobson and half-brother to William Lambert Dobson, and Frank Dobson. Alfred Dobson was educated at The Hutchins School, Sandy Bay, Hobart and became a student of the Inner Temple on 20 April 1872, being called to the English bar on 26 January 1875.

== Career in Australia ==
Returning to Tasmania, Dobson was called to the bar there on 10 September 1875, and was a member of the Tasmanian House of Assembly from 14 June 1877 to May 1887. Mr. Dobson was Attorney-General in the Fysh Ministry from 13 August 1877 (when he was sworn of the Executive Council), to 20 December 1878, and was Speaker of the Tasmanian House of Assembly from 1 July 1885 to 29 May 1887, when he resigned his seat of Glenorchy on accepting appointment as the Solicitor-General.

Dobson was leader of the opposition 1883 to 1885 and Speaker from July 1885 to May 1887. In April 1901 Dobson became Agent-General for Tasmania in London, a position he held until his death from drowning in the English Channel on 5 December 1908. Shortly before his death, Dobson declined the position of judge of the Supreme Court of Tasmania.
