= William Collins (cricketer, born 1837) =

Australian cricketer

William Collins (9 December 1837 – 12 January 1876) was an Australian cricketer. He was a right-handed batsman who played for Tasmania. He was born and died in Launceston.

Collins made a single first-class appearance for the side, during the 1872–73 season, against Victoria. From the lower-middle order, he scored 2 runs in the first innings in which he batted, and 14 runs in the second.

== See also ==
- List of Tasmanian representative cricketers
