= Henry Lamb (politician) =

Australian politician

Member of the Tasmanian House of Assembly for Clarence
- In office 30 May 1877 – July 1886
- Preceded by: David Lewis
- Succeeded by: Abolished

Member of the Tasmanian Legislative Council for Pembroke
- In office 14 April 1891 – 2 May 1899
- Preceded by: William Hodgson
- Succeeded by: William Perkins

Personal details
- Born: 20 September 1835 Spring Cove, New South Wales, Australia
- Died: 13 January 1903 (aged 67) Bellerive, Tasmania, Australia

Henry Lamb (20 September 1835 – 13 January 1903) was an Australian politician.

Lamb was born in Spring Cove in Sydney in 1835. In 1877 he was elected to the Tasmanian House of Assembly, representing the seat of Clarence. He served the seat's abolition in 1886. In 1891 he was elected to the Tasmanian Legislative Council for Pembroke, where he served until 1899. He died in 1903 in Bellerive.

Tasmanian House of Assembly
Preceded by David Lewis	Member for Clarence; 1877–1886	Abolished
Tasmanian Legislative Council
Preceded by William Hodgson	Member for Pembroke; 1891–1899	Succeeded by William Perkins
