= Frederick Rattle =

Australian politician

Frederick Bowden Rattle (13 August 1869 – 13 August 1950) was an Australian politician.

He was born in Hobart and was an accountant and solicitor before entering politics. In 1903 he was elected to the Tasmanian House of Assembly as the member for Glenorchy. With the introduction of proportional representation in 1909 he successfully ran for the new seat of Denison as an Anti-Socialist. He left the House in 1912 and died in Hobart in 1950.
