= James Agnew =

Australian politician (1815–1901)

Sir James Agnew KCMG
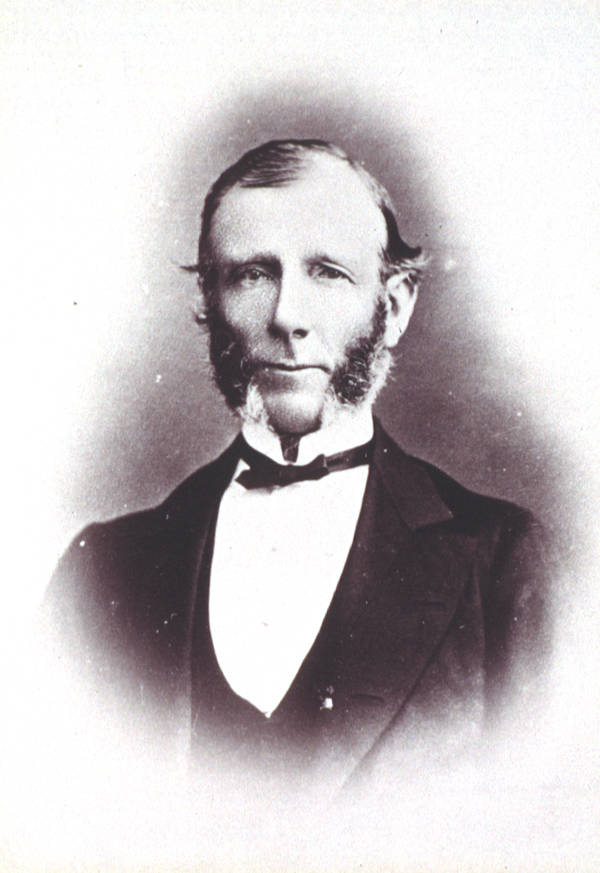

16th Premier of Tasmania
- In office 8 March 1886 – 29 March 1887
- Preceded by: Adye Douglas
- Succeeded by: Philip Fysh

Personal details
- Born: 2 October 1815 Ballyclare, County Antrim, Ireland, UK
- Died: 8 November 1901 (aged 86) Hobart, Tasmania, Australia
- Spouse(s): Louisa Mary Fraser; Blanche Legge

Sir James Willson Agnew KCMG (2 October 1815 – 8 November 1901) was an Irish-born Australian politician, who was Premier of Tasmania from 1886 to 1887.

== Arms ==
Coat of arms of James Agnew

Notes
Granted on 9 March 1891 by Sir John Bernard Burke, Ulster King of Arms.
Crest
On a wreath of the colours an eagle issuant rising and reguardant Proper charged on the breast with a trefoil as in the arms.
Escutcheon
Gules on a chevron between in chief two cinquefoils and in base a saltire couped Argent a trefoil slipped Vert.
Motto
Consilio Non Impeto

== See also ==
- Mennell, Philip (1892). "Agnew, Hon. James Wilson" . The Dictionary of Australasian Biography. London: Hutchinson & Co – via Wikisource.

== Sources ==
- Green, F. C. (1969). "Agnew, Sir James Willson (1815-1901)". Australian Dictionary of Biography. National Centre of Biography, Australian National University. ISBN 978-0-522-84459-7. ISSN 1833-7538. OCLC 70677943.
- Serle, Percival (1949). "Agnew, James". Dictionary of Australian Biography. Sydney: Angus & Robertson.
- "Sir James Willson Agnew". Members of the Parliament of Tasmania.
- Australian Encyclopædia (1912 - third edition revised 1927) published by Angus & Robertson Limited, Sydney (page 40)

Additional resources listed by Australian Dictionary of Biography:

- E. L. Piesse, The Foundation and Early Work of the Society: With Some Account of Earlier Institutions and Societies in Tasmania (Hobart, 1913); F. C. Green (ed), A Century of Responsible Government 1856-1956 (Hobart, 1956); Mercury (Hobart), 9, 11 November 1901; correspondence file under James Agnew (Archives Office of Tasmania).

Political offices
Preceded by Adye Douglas	Premier of Tasmania; 1886–1887	Succeeded by Philip Fysh
Tasmanian Legislative Council
Preceded by Alfred Kennerley	Member for Hobart; 1877–1881; Served alongside: Crowther, Wilson/McGregor	Succeeded by Thomas Smart
Preceded by James MacLanachan	Member for Jordan; 1884–1885	Abolished
New seat	Member for Macquarie; 1886–1887	Succeeded by Alfred Page
