= Electoral district of Fingal =

Former electoral district of the Tasmanian House of Assembly

The Electoral district of Fingal was a single-member electoral district of the Tasmanian House of Assembly. It was located in Fingal in Tasmania's east and also included the coastal towns of St Marys and St Helens, and inland districts such as Avoca and Mathinna.

The seat was created ahead of the Assembly's first election held in 1856, and was abolished when the Tasmanian parliament adopted the Hare-Clark electoral model in 1909.

== Members for Fingal ==
Member	Term
Frederick von Steiglitz	1856–1857
Francis Smith	1857–1860
Francis von Steiglitz	1860–1861
James Grant	1861–1863
John Swan	1863–1871
William Gellibrand	1871–1872
Sir Adye Douglas	1872–1884
John George Davies	1884–1909
