= William Race Allison =

Tasmanian landowner and politician

William Page Allison

Member of the Tasmanian Legislative Council
- In office April 1846 – 29 December 1855

Member of the House of Assembly for Campbell Town
- In office 16 September 1856 – 8 November 1862

Member of the House of Assembly for Hobart Town
- In office 7 November 1862 – 26 September 1865

Personal details
- Born: 1812 England
- Died: 26 September 1865 (aged 52–53) Tasmania

William Race Allison (1812-1865) was an Australian politician and landowner. He was a member of the Tasmanian Legislative Council from 1846 to 1855, the member for Campbell Town in the House of Assembly from 1856 to 1862, and the member for Hobart Town in the House of Assembly from 1862 to his death in 1865.
