= John George Davies =

Australian politician, newspaper proprietor and cricketer (1846–1913)

John Davies
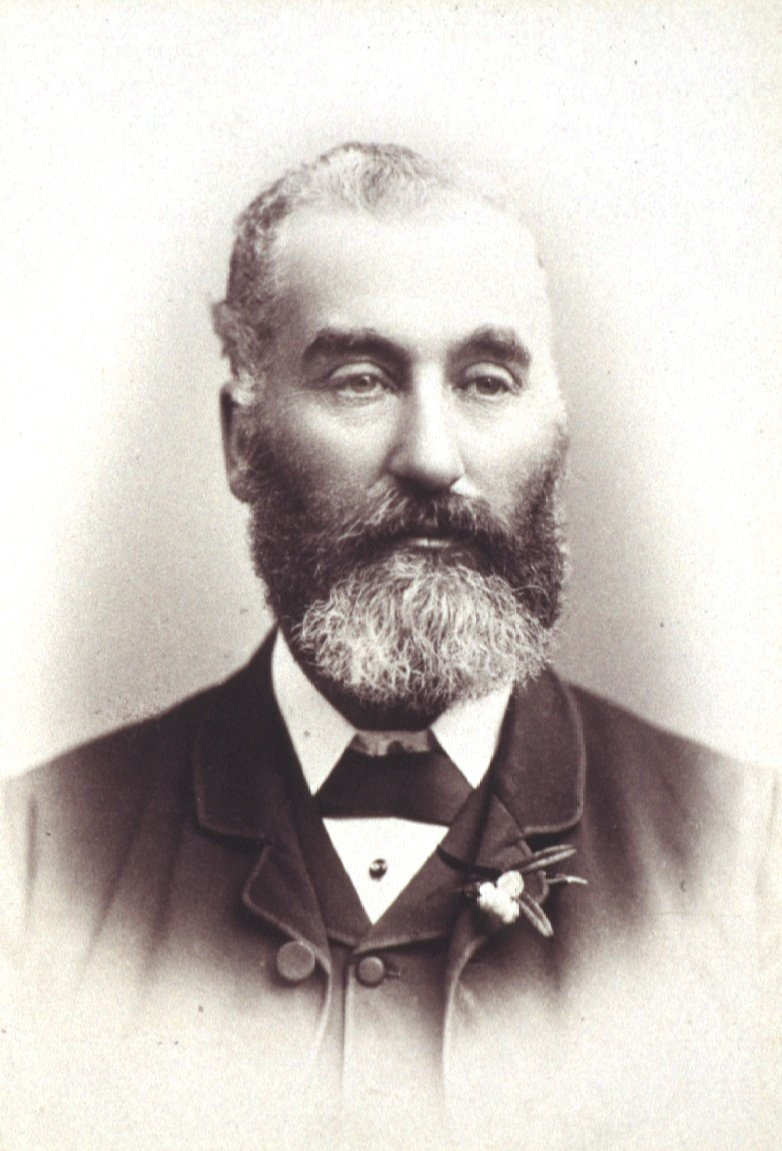

Personal information
- Full name: John George Davies
- Born: 17 February 1846; Melbourne, Victoria
- Died: 12 November 1913 (aged 67); New Town, Tasmania, Australia
- Batting: Left-handed
- Role: batsman/wicket keeper

Domestic team information
- Years: Team
- 1871 to 1884: Tasmania
- First-class debut: 24 February 1871 Tasmania v Victoria
- Last First-class: 25 February 1884 Tasmania v Canterbury

Career statistics
Competition	First-class
Matches	7
Runs scored	149
Batting average	10.64
100s/50s	0/0
Top score	42
Balls bowled	30
Wickets	3
Bowling average	6.33
5 wickets in innings	-
10 wickets in match	-
Best bowling	2/0
Catches/stumpings	8/3
- Source: CricketArchive, 13 May 2010

Sir John George Davies KCMG (17 February 1846 – 12 November 1913), generally known as (Sir) George Davies, was a Tasmanian politician, newspaper proprietor and first-class cricketer.

Davies' Jewish father John Snr. and grandfather had been transported to Australia as convicts and Davies was born in Melbourne to John Snr. and Elizabeth Davies (née Ellis) following Davies Snr's release.

The Davies family moved to Tasmania, where Davies Snr co-founded the Hobart Mercury and became a prominent citizen of Hobart, including serving in the Tasmanian House of Assembly.

Davies and his brother Charles were educated at Melbourne Grammar School and The Hutchins School in Hobart, where he showed great promise as a sportsman.

== Sporting career ==
Davies' cricketing skills led him to play against the touring H.H. Stephenson's English side in 1862, aged 16, scoring six. He continued to represent Tasmania in non-first-class matches throughout the 1860s.

Davies made his first-class cricket debut for Tasmania against Victoria at the Melbourne Cricket Ground on 24 February 1871. Davies captained Tasmania, opened the batting and kept wicket. He was the only batsman from either side to reach double figures in each innings.

Due to work pressures and the small number of matches Tasmania were involved in, Davies only played seven first-class matches. Four of those matches came when he captained a Tasmanian team on a tour of the South Island of New Zealand in February 1884. He made his highest score of 42 on that tour, against Canterbury in Christchurch. His best bowling figures were two wickets for no runs against South Australia in November 1877.

Davies' final first-class match was in New Zealand in 1884 but he continued to be heavily involved in cricket, founding the Southern Tasmanian Cricket Association and serving as a senior administrator for many years, writing on cricket for the Tasmanian Mail as well as umpiring, including one first-class match, Tasmania against Victoria in 1890.

Davies' final senior match was in February 1899, when, aged 52, he captained the Southern Tasmania Cricket Association against the touring New Zealanders. In a team including Test players Charles Eady and Kenny Burn, Davies made 65.

In recognition of his role in Tasmanian cricket, Davies was made an honorary life member of the Tasmanian Cricket Association in 1907, the name of the road leading to the entrance of the TCA Ground was named Davies Avenue in his honour and the Sir George Davies Memorial Cup is played for by year nine and ten high school cricketers in southern Tasmania.

Davies was also involved in other sports, including Australian rules football, where he served as a senior administrator, horse racing (as an owner) and rifle shooting, holding office in Tasmanian and National Rifle Associations for many years, culminating in his captaining of the Australian team which won the Kolapore Cup at Bisley, England, in 1902.

== Business career ==
After leaving school, Davies trained as a journalist at The Mercury, eventually becoming general manager. In 1871 Davies and his brother took over the company from their father and established The Mercury as Tasmania's preeminent newspaper and started the weekly Tasmanian Mail in 1877.

== Politics ==
Davies was elected as an alderman of Hobart City Council in 1883, and first served as mayor of Hobart in 1885. A justice of the peace, Davies served three terms as mayor before his retirement in 1901. He was in charge of the Tasmanian industrial court at the Melbourne Centennial Exhibition of 1888, and was honorary commissioner for Tasmania at the 1889 Paris Exhibition. Chief magistrate of Hobart in the 1890s, he was appointed first chairman of the Metropolitan Drainage Board in 1899 and was also for many years chairman of the Public Cemetery Trust and of the Hobart Licensing Bench.

Politically conservative, Davies was first elected to the Electoral district of Fingal in the Tasmanian House of Assembly on 27 August 1884, and was still serving in parliament at his death, switching to in the newly formed division of Denison in 1909.

In parliament, Davies was chairman of committees from 1892 to 1903 and Speaker from 1903 to his death in 1913.

He was appointed a Companion of the Order of St Michael and St George (CMG) on 15 May 1901, in recognition of his service as Mayor of the City of Hobart and in preparation of the royal visit by the Duke and Duchess of Cornwall and York (later King George V and Queen Mary) He was knighted as a Knight Commander of the Order of St Michael and St George (KCMG) on 25 June 1909 for his services as Speaker of the Tasmanian House of Assembly.

== Personal life ==
Davies married twice, the first to Sarah Ann Pearce on 27 January 1869 at St John's Church of England, New Town, with whom he had seven children. Following Sarah's death in 1888, Davies married Constance Charlotte Giblin (22 June 1854 – 2 December 1929), sister of William Giblin, on 19 November 1891 at New Town. Together they had two sons.

Davies was a leading member of Tasmanian society, becoming deputy grand master of Tasmanian Freemasons in 1896 and made past grand master in 1910, as well as being a member of the Royal Society of Tasmania and serving in the Tasmanian Rifle Regiment for over thirty years, reaching the rank of lieutenant-colonel.

Davies died of kidney disease on 12 November 1913 at New Town. He was buried alongside his brother at Cornelian Bay Cemetery.

== See also ==
- List of Tasmanian representative cricketers
