= Francis Smith (Australian politician) =

Australian politician

Sir Francis Smith
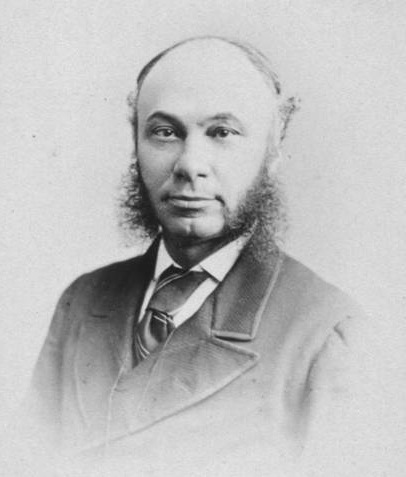

4th Premier of Tasmania
- In office 12 May 1857 – 1 November 1860
- Preceded by: William Weston
- Succeeded by: William Weston

Chief Justice of Tasmania
- In office 1870–1885
- Preceded by: Sir Valentine Fleming
- Succeeded by: Sir William Lambert Dobson

Personal details
- Born: 13 February 1819 Port-au-Prince, Haiti
- Died: 17 January 1909 (aged 89) London, England, UK
- Spouse: Sarah Giles
- Profession: Lawyer
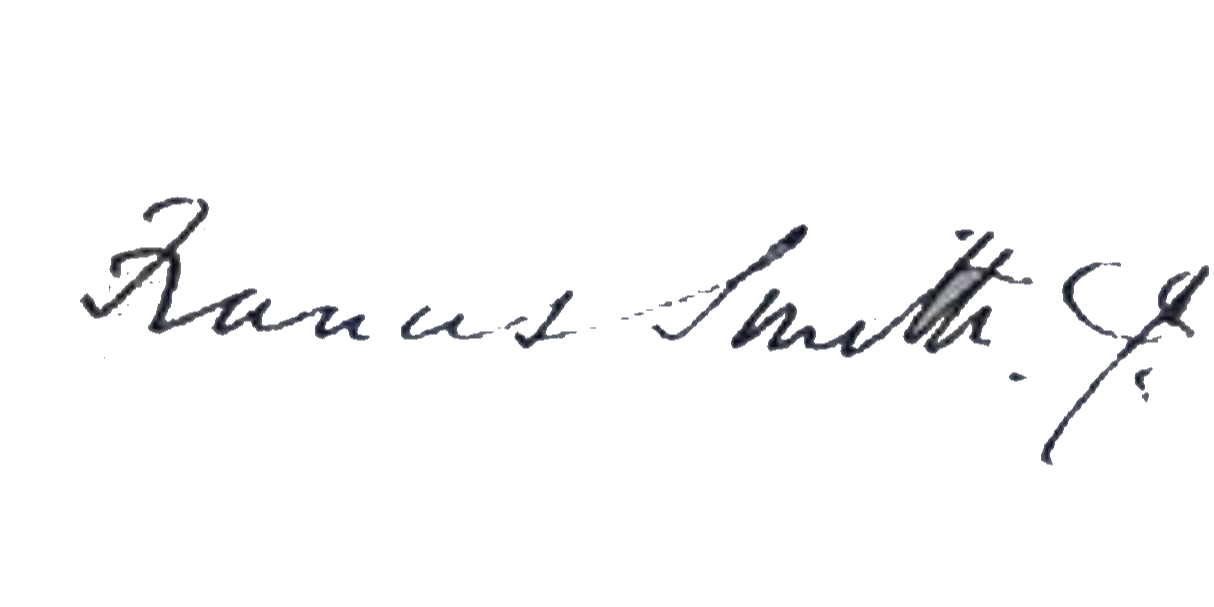
- Signature

Sir Francis Villeneuve Smith (13 February 1819 – 17 January 1909) was an Australian lawyer, judge and politician, who served as the fourth Premier of Tasmania from 12 May 1857 until 1 November 1860.

== Early life: West Indies ==
Smith was born in Port-au-Prince, Haiti. His mother, Marie Josephine Villeneuve (? – 4 December 1893), was of African descent but nothing more is known about her parents. Smith would acknowledge his mother's ancestry by adopting her surname in 1884.

While his mother was a resident of Port-au-Prince, his father was recorded as ‘Sir (sic) Francis Smith, foreign merchant in this town’. He ‘declared being the natural father of the child…’

Francis Smith senior (5 November 1787– 8 September 1855) was born in Nevis, the son of the ships’ carpenter Francis Smith (? – January 1790) and his common-law wife Amelia Brodbelt (? – May 1817). Described as a ‘mulatto’, in March 1765 Amelia Brodbelt had been freed from enslavement by Frances Brodbelt of Nevis. Frances was the unmarried sister of the Nevis planter James Brodbelt who was Amelia Brodbelt’s father. Throughout her life, Amelia was known as a ‘free coloured woman’.

== Early life: to Tasmania via England ==
By 1821 Francis Smith senior and his family were living at 26 Brunswick Place, Shoreditch, London. Francis was baptised on 24 September 1821 in the local church, St Leonard's. Before May 1824 the family moved to Lindfield, Sussex, where his father bought a farm which he sold prior to leaving for Australia.

The family arrived in Port Jackson, Sydney on 15 November 1828. After a brief stay in Sydney and then Hobart Francis Smith senior bought two large tracts of partially developed land north of Richmond in the Australian colony of Van Diemen’s Land (later called Tasmania) and became a farmer.

== Education and career ==
Smith grew up on his father’s estate, ‘Campania' in Tasmania but returned to England to further his education. In 1838 he began studying law at the Middle Temple and arts at University College London, graduating with a BA in 1840. He was called to the Bar on 27 May 1842 and in later life was a Bencher of his Inn from 1890 to 1898.

After returning to Tasmania, he was admitted to the Tasmanian Bar in October 1844. He became 'a barrister of some standing 'whose talent and legal knowledge have obtained for him a very large amount of practice'.

In 1851 he became a member of the Tasmanian Legislative Council and soon after became Solicitor-General, a role he served until 1854.

He was elected to the Tasmanian House of Assembly in 1856 and served as Attorney-General in William Champ's first ministry from 1 November 1856 until 26 February 1857. When William Weston's ministry (1857) collapsed, he proceeded to form his own with himself as Premier and Attorney-General. He held office for three years until 1860, becoming the first Premier of Tasmania to hold office for more than one year. In 1860 he was appointed to the Supreme Court bench, becoming Chief Justice in 1870. During his time as Chief Justice of the Supreme Court of Tasmania he displayed legal aptitude, producing well-reasoned judgments.

Smith was knighted in 1862.

On ending his distinguished legal and political career, he retired to England where he died on 17 January 1909 in Tunbridge Wells, Kent.

== Family ==
Smith married Sarah Giles on 26 August 1851. She was born about 1832 in Foxford, County Mayo, Ireland and died on 29 July 1909. She was the only child of the Reverend George Giles of Launceston. They had two sons and two daughters; only one of the sons has been identified:

o Francis George Villeneuve Smith (1854–1941), solicitor, left Tasmania for Sydney in 1883, on 2 July 1885 married Caroline (Lena) Anne Shadforth Stephen, only child of Mr M. H. Stephen, barrister-at-law.

o Kate Villeneuve Smith (c 1856 Tasmania - ?)

o Margaret Villeneuve Smith (c 1861 Tasmania - ?)

Political offices
Preceded by William Weston	Premier of Tasmania; 1857–1860	Succeeded by William Weston
Legal offices
Preceded by Sir Valentine Fleming	Chief Justice of Tasmania; 1870-1885	Succeeded by Sir William Dobson
