= Douglas Kilburn =

Australian photographer and daguerreotypist

Douglas Thomas Kilburn
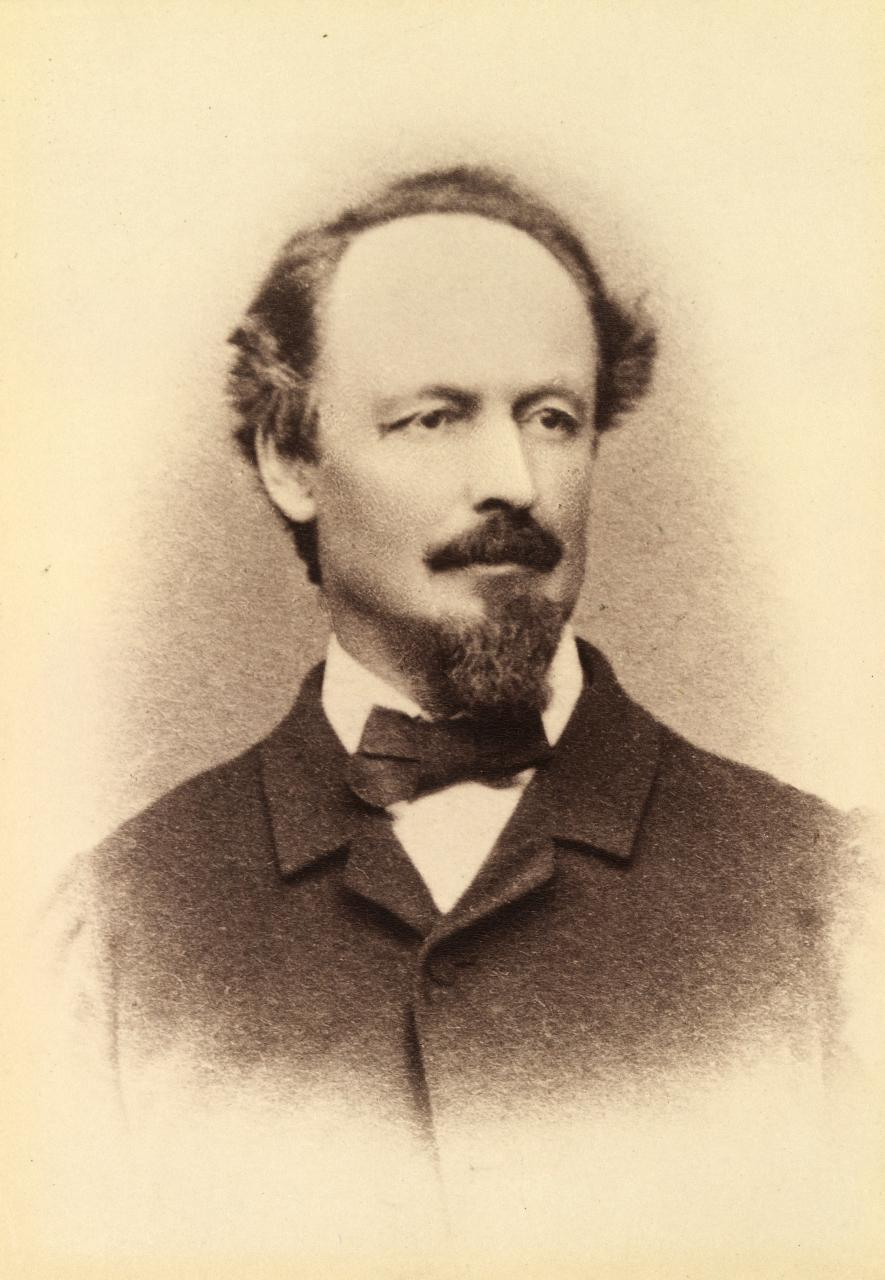
- Douglas Kilburn photographed in 1850
- Born: 1813; London, England
- Died: 10 March 1871 (aged 57–58); Hobart, Tasmania
- Education: autodidact
- Known for: Photography, Painting
- Spouse: Anna Maria (née Patterson)
- Awards: 1955: Honourable Mention, Exposition Universelle (1855), Paris

Douglas Thomas Kilburn (1811 or 1813–10 March 1871) was an English-born watercolour painter and professional daguerreotypist who operated in Melbourne 1847–49, producing some of the earliest portrait photographs of Indigenous Australians.

== Early life ==
Douglas was born in 1813 in London, the son of Catherine (née Ward) and Thomas Kilburn and trained as an artist. His younger brother William (1818–1891) was working as a professional photographer prior to 1846, and Prince Albert saw his 1848 photographs of a Chartist Rally, and commissioned him; thenceforth William promoted himself at his studio at 234 Regent Street London as ‘Photographist to Her Majesty and His Royal Highness Prince Albert’. He exhibited daguerreotypes at the 1851 Great Exhibition, but from 1856 used only collodion.

Douglas Kilburn meanwhile emigrated to Australia before 1847, where brother William supplied him with equipment and materials shipped from England. It is likely that they were supplying others also; the brothers set up a partnership as Custom House and Commission Agents which was dissolved by mutual consent in August 1848 after Douglas' establishment of a studio.

== In Australia ==
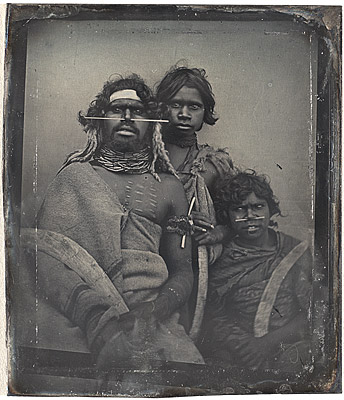
Douglas Kilburn (1847) South-east Australian Aboriginal man and two younger companions, Melbourne, daguerreotype, ¼ plate in Wharton case, 8.0 h x 6.8 w cm, National Gallery of Australia, purchased 2007, Accession no NGA 2007.81.122

=== Melbourne ===
In 1847 Kilburn advertised his services in Melbourne as preparing to; "take Likenesses by the Daguerreotype process as soon as the fine weather sets in. A room in a central part of the town will be fitted so as to soften the day-light, and thus protect sitters from the painful glare of the sunshine, and the publicity of an open courtyard."

=== Early photographs of indigenous people ===
Creating an indispensable historical record, around 1847-8 Kilburn, on his own undertaking made the earliest surviving daguerreotypes of "the curious race of Aborigines," as he was reported calling them; Boon Wurrung people of the Yalukit clan from around the Yarra River and Port Phillip Bay, and the township of Melbourne founded only 12 years before.

Kilburn's only possible rival in achieving this 'first' is Thomas Browne (1816-1870) Hobart publisher, lithographer and stationer who since 1846 made daguerreotype portraits at 31 Macquarie Street, Hobart as he advertised in the Hobart Colonial Times of 9 January 1849, and also toured the island making photographs. The date of Browne's photograph of a Tasmanian First Nations group Walter, Mary Ann and David Bruney, is sometime during the 1847–1855 governorship of William Denison, at either Government House cottage, New Norfolk, on 27 December 1847, or before 31 January 1848 in Hobart Town.

William Westgarth made engravings from Kilburn's daguerreotypes for his guide for prospective settlers, Australia Felix; Eugene von Guérard and John Skinner Prout also used the photographs, or engravings from them, as reference for paintings; they illustrated Nordisk Penning-Magazin in 1849; and through the efforts of Douglas' brother William which significantly expanded their audience, the Illustrated London News published engravings of them in its 26 January 1850 issue, accompanied by this account:

"It appears that Mr Kilburn, the brother of the eminent Photographer of Regent-street, has long resided in Australia, and felt anxious to portray the curious race of Aborigines by aid of the Daguerreotype. Mr. Kilburn had much difficulty in prevailing upon any individual to sit, from some superstitious fear that they possess, imagining that it would subject them to some misfortune. He lost no opportunity in persuading them, by small bribes, when they wandered into Port Phillip, usually for the purposes of begging: but, in return, they appeared always willing to render any assistance in chopping wood, &c. At length, Mr. Kilburn succeeded, and the result is here presented to the reader."

Four of the original daguerreotype plates from Kilburn's aboriginal portraits, out of perhaps ten, are known to have survived, three of them housed in the National Gallery of Victoria, and one in the National Gallery of Australia. They depict separate groups of men and of women as well as a man with two children, presumed to be a family group. Kilburn had to bribe and coerce them to pose in traditional possum-skin cloaks he kept for the purpose rather than the European clothes they were adopting.

Ennis regards this strategy as a sign of Kilburn's "grasp of [19th century] pictorial codes for representing indigenous people" serving to represent the "otherness of Aborigines - their bare skin, distinctive cicatrix and handmade weapons ...markers of primitiveness and difference," in service of the ideal of the 'noble savage'. Though Kilburn reported that they refused to pose again on seeing their images, the men, women and children appear proud and strong, natural and less fearful or hostile, than the indigenous in others' later photographs elsewhere, though in one picture the women depicted avert their gaze or close their eyes.

=== Reactions to the portraits of First Nations people ===
In the preface of his book Westgarth remarks on these images:

“The drawings of the aborigines are copied from some excellent daguerreotyped likenesses brought home by Mr. Robert Cunningham, late of Port Phillip, now of Glasgow, and kindly lent to me for the purpose. They are, I believe, the only productions of the sort as yet in this country, and afford of course a very accurate picture of the Australian natives”.

According to Professor Gil Pasternak of Photographic Cultures and Heritage at De Montfort, one anonymous contemporary reviewer of Westgarth's discussion of Australian Indigenous people wrote that it was "a disagreeable subject, because so soon as our curiosity is gratified, every philanthropic hope is destroyed by the conviction, forced upon us by the failure of repeated attempts, that the race is incapable of elevation." Brenda L. Croft provides a contemporary First Nations reaction in a vehement re-reading of Kilburn's photography, pointing in her essay Laying Ghosts to Rest, to;

"The younger man, [who] with his equally direct gaze at the viewer and the photographer, appears greatly amused by the whole scenario, exuding a confidence that belies the impending fate of thousands of his compatriots. Their gaze subverts the officially sanctioned opinion that these people were members of a race, of many nations, on the verge of extinction. The joke is on whom? This same gaze, the same stance, the same resistance is echoed in images of Indigenous people from every place and of every time."

Croft asks why the names of the collectors of these photographic "specimens," are known while the subjects' are not, leaving "an irrevocable sense of loss," and whether the photographed might have trusted the photographers, or even regarded them was friends. She answers for herself;

"I do not sense this as I refer to "their" images over and over, searching for something not already observed ... Re-reading the sparse details relating to the portraits, a heady combination of anger and grief almost overwhelms me. I want to know who they were, where they were from, what became of them. Their names should be invoked, although this acts against traditional cultural practice. These people deserve to be commemorated as the individuals, community members, and elders they were; not as disembodied, cut off from their traditions, their spirits never to rest."

=== Melbourne and Sydney studios ===
From May 1848, in Little Collins Street, Douglas Kilburn established Melbourne's first (according to Willis and Edmonds) or more likely second, daguerreotype studio after George Barron Goodman's in 1845. The Argus newspaper in July urged its readers to ...

"... pay a visit to the studio of Mr. Kilburn, in Little Collins-street, in order to witness the wonder working powers of his daguerreotype. Acting on the instructions received from his brother, the most distinguished photograptic artist of the day, Mr. Kilburn has carried the art to a perfection hitherto unknown here–the likenesses he produces being speakingly true, and quite devoid of that dull leaden aspect which seemed formerly to be inseparable from likenesses obtained by this process.

In 1849, having relocated to Sydney, Kilburn made hand-coloured portraits of European settlers which were hailed by the Sydney Morning Herald on 18 September 1849 as superior to any previously in Australia, particularly the application of colour bestowing "a verisimilitude and beauty which are quite delightful". Merchant Alexander Brodie Spark, brought his step-daughter Alicia Radford to his studio in January 1850 for a portrait to celebrate her 21st birthday.

=== Tasmania ===
Kilburn paid a brief visit to Britain, sailing on the trader Waterloo 10 February 1850, to visit his brother, advertising his purpose to study new developments in photography. There also he married Anna Maria (née Patterson) and the couple settled in Hobart, Tasmania where he delivered the first scientific publication on photography in Australia; on stereoscopy, at the Royal Society of Van Diemen's Land in 1853, and on calotype photography in 1855, proclaiming an altruistic interest in encouraging others to take it up, and that year, donated antique and foreign coins to the Society.

His calotype views of Hobart won him an Honorable Mention at the Paris 1855 Exposition Universelle. In October 1856 Kilburn created a sensation selling life sized ‘chromotypes.' Prosperous from his photography businesses, Kilburn purchased several properties in Hobart, paying £3500 (worth A$452,800.00 in 2021) for the Bowling Green Hotel, £1800 for a warehouse on the Old Wharf and shops in Elizabeth St, and £500 for an unfinished two-storey freestone building on New Wharf; bid for the Royal Victoria Theatre; and raced his yacht Phantom.

Kilburn was a jury foreman in cases of murder, rape of a child and burglary, became a Justice of the Peace and Magistrate in 1854, then entered politics that year and ran unsuccessfully in municipal elections before he became an MP in the Tasmanian parliament until 1862, in which role he advocated for the Hobart Town Artillery and was its paymaster, called for cancellation of the telegraph construction on the basis of cost, opposed pensions for public servants, as a landlord himself agitated about rises in water rates, and called for a tax on all vehicles. He retired from parliament to join the Melbourne Argus, returning to Tasmania on retirement in about 1870.

He died at Hobart Town on 10 March 1871, and was buried in St David's Park, Hobart's first cemetery, dating from1804. He was survived by his wife Anna Maria, two sons and two daughters.

== Exhibitions ==
- 1854: Tasmanian Contributions To The Paris Exposition. Exhibition Building, Hobart
- 1855: Calotype Views: Bank of Australasia, Macquarie Street Hobart Town with St. Joseph's Church in the distance; New Market Place, Hobart Town; Residence of D.T. Kilburn, Esq., Davey Street, Hobart Town; St. David's Church, Macquarie Street, Hobart Town; St. Joseph's Church, Macquarie Street, Hobart Town, with St. David's in the distance. Paris Universal Exhibition
- 1858: Aborigines (4 photographs). Art-Treasures Exhibition, Legislative Chamber, Hobart Town

== Collections ==
- Australian National Gallery
- National Gallery of Victoria

== Gallery ==
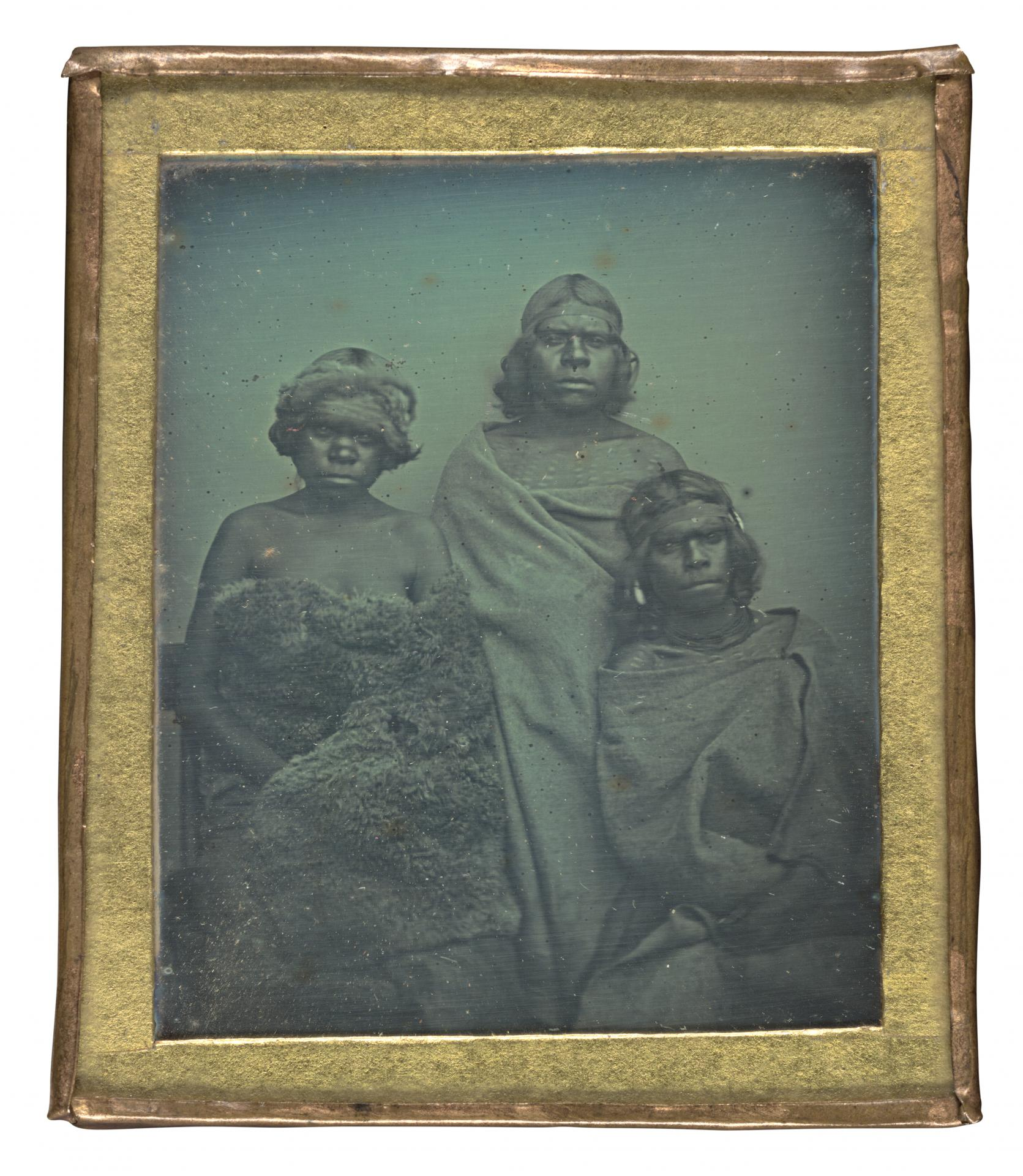
Douglas T. Kilbum British 1811–1871, worked in Australia from 1846 Group of Koori Women 1847 daguerreotype 7.5 x 6.5 cm National Gallery of Victoria, Melbourne Purchased, 1999 (2004.63)

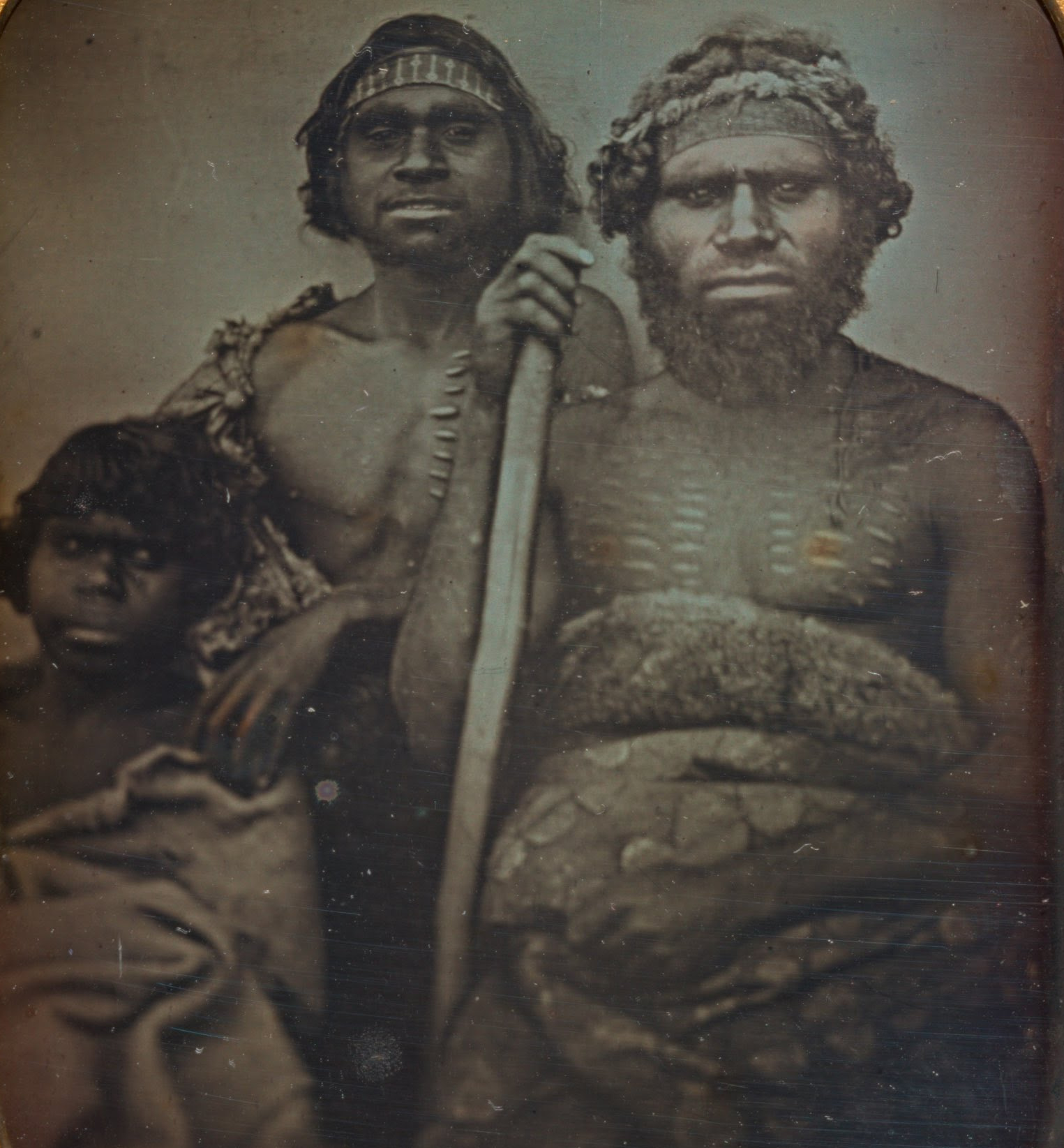
Douglas T. Kilburn (c. 1847) No title (Group of Koori men), daguerreotype in leather, wood, velvet, brass case (7.5 × 6.5 cm) (image) National Gallery of Victoria, Melbourne

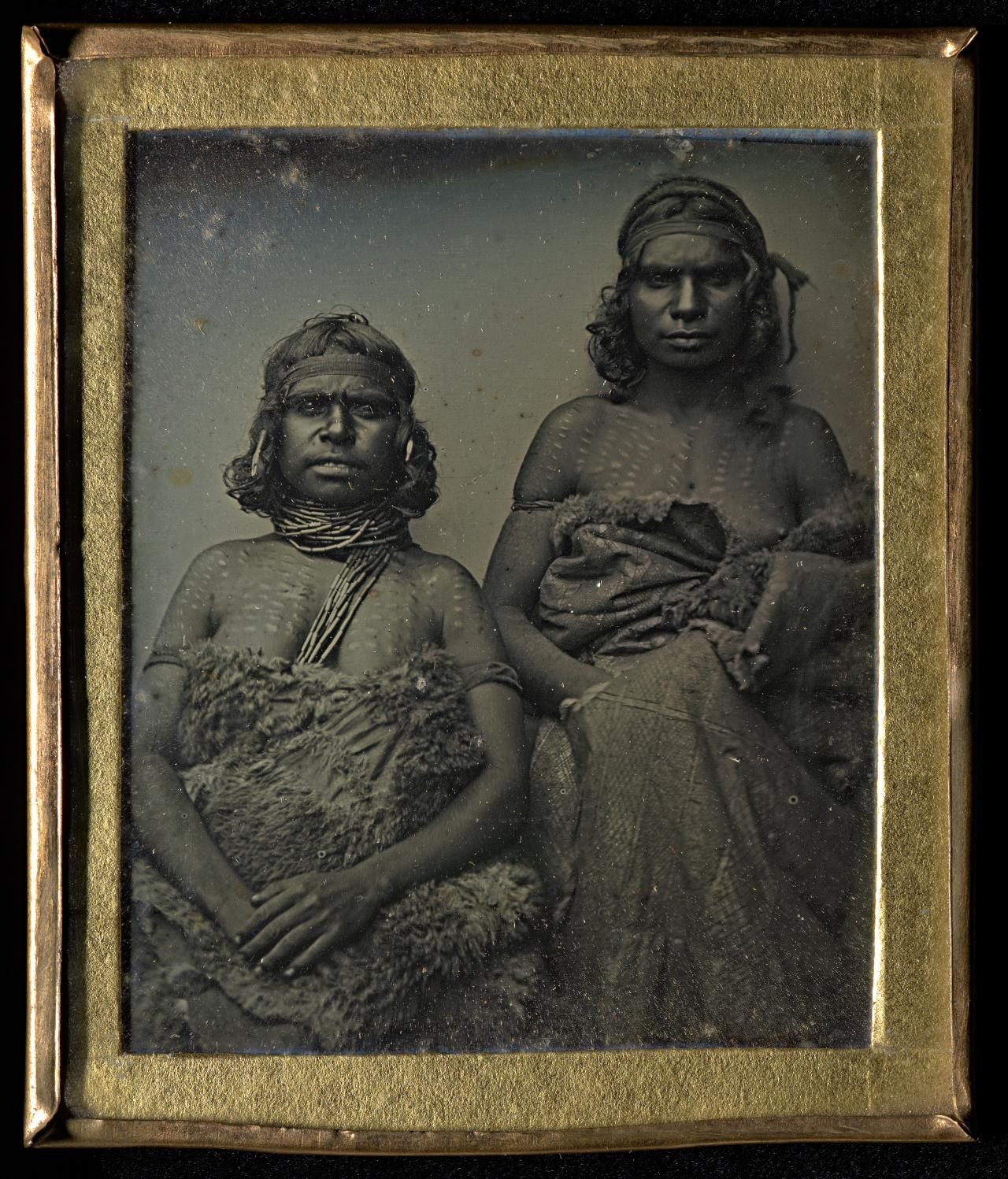
Douglas T. Kilburn (c. 1847) daguerreotype, 6.7 × 5.4 cm (image), in brass, glass, gold, velvet case Accession Number 2004.603 Australian Photography. National Gallery of Victoria, Melbourne Purchased, 2004
