= Electoral district of Devon =

Former Tasmanian House of Assembly electoral district (1856–1871)

The electoral district of Devon was a single-member electoral district of the Tasmanian House of Assembly. It was based in the north coastal and north-western regions of Tasmania, and its major town was Devonport.

The seat was created ahead of the Assembly's first election held in 1856, and was abolished at the 1871 election, being split into the electorates of Wellington, East Devon and West Devon.

== Members for Devon ==
Member	Term
James Gibson	1856–1860
William Archer	1860–1862
John Davies	1862–1871
