= William Crowther (Australian politician) =

Tasmanian politician (1817–1885)

Dr William Crowther FRCS
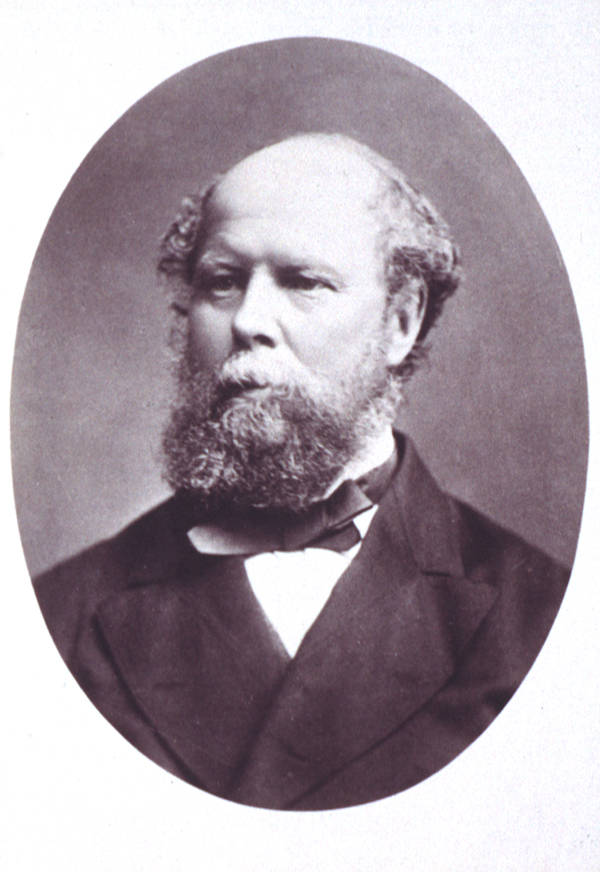
- Crowther photographed by John Watt Beattie

14th Premier of Tasmania
- In office 20 December 1878 – 29 October 1879
- Governor: Frederick Weld
- Preceded by: William Giblin
- Succeeded by: William Giblin

Member of the Tasmanian Legislative Council
- In office 22 March 1869 – 12 April 1885
- Preceded by: Philip Fysh
- Succeeded by: William Crosby
- Constituency: Hobart

Personal details
- Born: William Lodewyk Crowther; 15 April 1817 Haarlem, Netherlands
- Died: 12 April 1885 (aged 67) Hobart, Tasmania, Australia
- Spouse: Sarah Victoria Marie Louise Muller
- Profession: Surgeon

William Lodewyk Crowther FRCS (15 April 1817 − 12 April 1885) was a Tasmanian politician, who was Premier of Tasmania from 20 December 1878 to 29 October 1879.

His careers in medicine, politics, and business were overshadowed in modern times by his alleged role in the unsanctioned exhumation and decapitation of William Lanne's body. Lanne was believed to be the last "full-blooded" Aboriginal Tasmanian male and after the exhumation, his skull was sent by Crowther to the Royal College of Surgeons in London for preservation.

== Early life ==
Crowther was born on 15 April 1817 in Haarlem, Netherlands. He was the son of Sarah (née Pearson) and William Crowther, who was later a long-time resident surgeon of Hobart. The Crowthers moved to Van Diemen's Land (now Tasmania) in 1824.

Crowther was educated at Richard B. Claiborne's Grammar School in Longford, Tasmania in 1828. On his 120-mile (193 km) walks to and from school in holidays, Crowther developed a strong interest in natural history.

Crowther was subsequently apprenticed as an apothecarist in Hobart but without qualifications. After the death of his father in 1839, William Crowther continued his medical studies in England. He famously travelled from Hobart with a large collection of Tasmanian fauna, which included potoroos, black-faced wallabies, a pair of Tasmanian devils and 493 skins. This collection was sold to the Earl of Derby which allowed him to pay his fees at St Thomas's Hospital (M.R.C.S., L.R.C.P., 1841) and a year of study in Paris.

In 1842, William Crowther returned to Hobart and took over his father's former practice.

== Business interests ==
Crowther engaged in various commercial enterprises in Tasmania. He was a shipowner, had sawmills on the Huon River and shipped lumber from Tasmania to other Australian colonies and New Zealand. He sent ships to collect guano from islands in the Coral Sea and engaged in sealing and pelagic whaling from Hobart. Six vessels he owned made 44 whaling voyages from Hobart between 1854 and 1877.

== Removal of Indigenous remains ==
Crowther is noted for allegedly mutilating the remains of William Lanne, a Tasmanian Aboriginal man, in 1869. He was suspected of removing Lanne's skull and sending it to the Royal College of Surgeons in London. He was suspended from his role as honorary medical officer at the Hobart General Hospital over charges arising from this mutilation. An inquiry showed that two mutilations had taken place, the first at the Colonial Hospital, the other at the cemetery the night of the burial. Drs Crowther and G. Stokell, resident medical officer at the hospital, were suspected of the first, the Royal Society of Tasmania of the second. A petition with 48 pages of closely-packed signatures was sent to Governor (Sir) Charles Du Cane seeking annulment of Crowther's suspension, without success.

Crowther threatened violence when challenged about his actions by then Premier Alfred Kennerley in the Tasmanian Parliament in August 1873:

A fracas occurred outside the Council chamber, Hobart Town, a few nights ago. Mr. Crowther, member for Hobart Town, threatened his colleague, Mr. Kennerley, with personal violence, because of the latter's allusion to Mr. Crowther's alleged abstraction of the last aboriginal's head. Mr. Kennerley called the attention of the House to the circumstance, and Mr. Crowther was reprimanded.

— Nelson Examiner and New Zealand Chronicle, 15 August 1873

== Death and legacy ==
Crowther died in Hobart on 12 April 1885, three days before his 68th birthday. He was survived by his wife Victoria Marie Louise, daughter of General Muller, and their eight children. One of his sons, Edward Crowther, was a member of the Tasmanian parliament from 1878 to 1912.

In 1935 W. L. Crowther's face mask joined those of other eminent Australians in the gallery of the Institute of Anatomy in Canberra.

The W. L. Crowther Library was named in his memory, and presented to the State Library of Tasmania by his grandson Sir William Crowther (1887–1981), son of Edward, in 1964.

Despite a long life involving many other endeavours and achievements in his adopted home and abroad, according to historian Helen Patricia MacDonald, referring to the theft of Lanne's remains, "the events of 1869 came to define William Crowther's place in Tasmanian history".

=== Statue ===
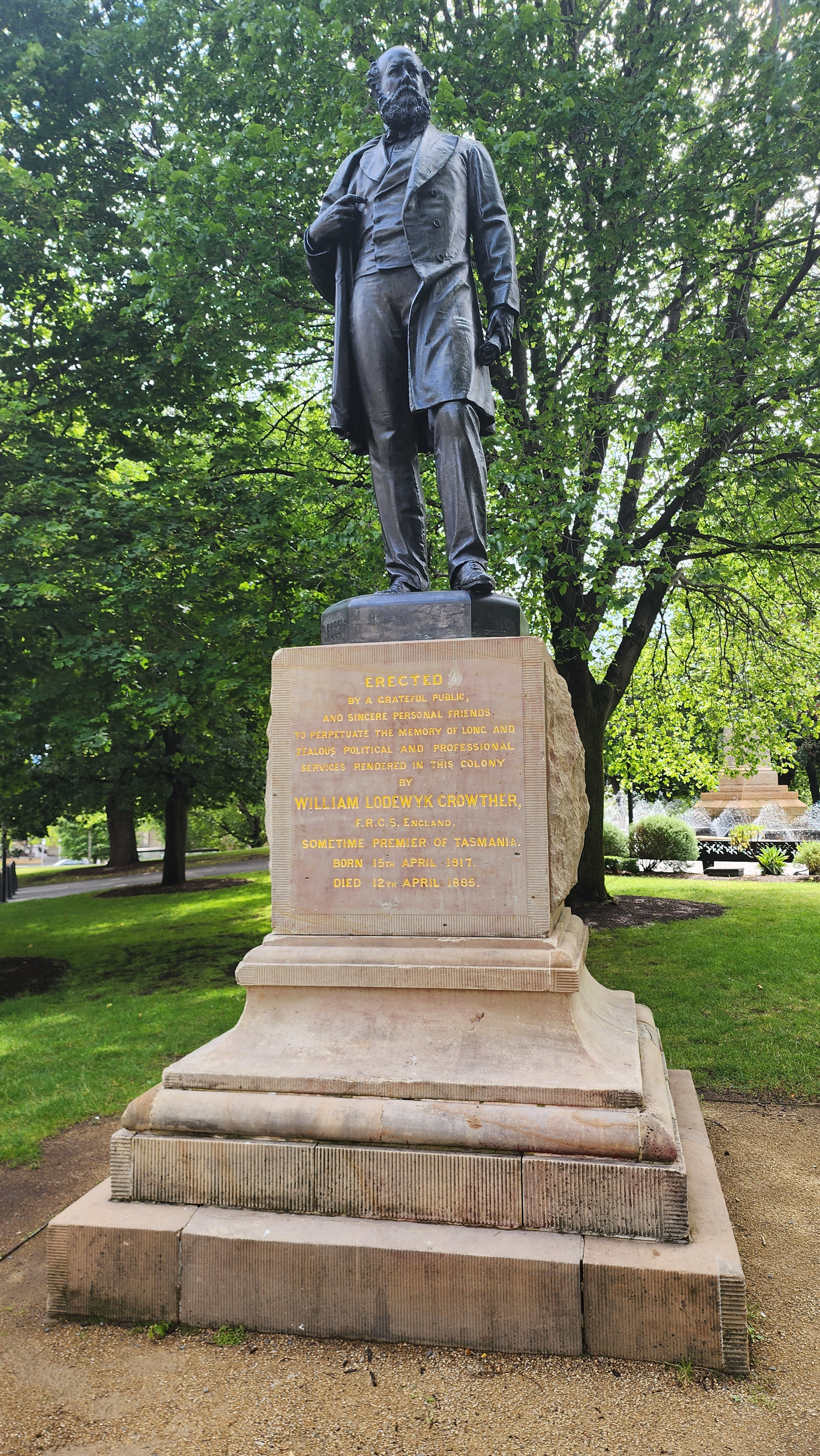
Statue of Crowther in Franklin Square, Hobart

A bronze statue of Crowther was erected in Franklin Square, Hobart, on 9 January 1889, funded by public subscription. The inscription reads:

Erected by a grateful public, and sincere personal friends

To perpetuate the memory of long and zealous political and professional services rendered in this Colony by William Lodewyck Crowther F.R.C.S. England
Sometime Premier of Tasmania
Born 15th April, 1817

Died 12th April, 1885

On 15 August 2022 the Hobart City Council voted 7 to 4 in favour of removing Crowther's statue from public display in Franklin Square, as an act of reconciliation. Lord Mayor, Anna Reynolds, said "[This] does not change history", adding that the records and stories remained unchanged; however, "We don't want to celebrate a time in our history when scientists and doctors wanted to prove theories of European superiority". She said that the statue would be conserved, and that preliminary discussions had been held with the Tasmanian Museum and Art Gallery about moving it there.

In the early hours of Wednesday 15 May 2024 Crowther's statue was toppled after a tool was used to cut through the legs. The incident was condemned by the Hobart City Council's chief executive as an act of vandalism. The plinth was spray painted with the graffiti "What goes around" and "decolonize". Tasmanian Aboriginal Centre (TAC) campaign manager Nala Mansell said the desecration of the statue reflected community attitudes that the statue should be removed.

The downing of the statue came a day after someone attempted to saw through the statue's ankles but stopped about two-thirds through.

Political offices
Preceded by William Giblin	Premier of Tasmania; 1878–1879	Succeeded by William Giblin
Tasmanian Legislative Council
Preceded by Philip Fysh	Member for Hobart; 1869–1885; Served alongside: Agnew/Smart, Wilson/McGregor	Succeeded by William Crosby
