= Adolphus Rooke =

Australian politician

Member of the Tasmanian House of Assembly
- In office 20 September 1856 – November 1862
- Preceded by: Seat created
- Succeeded by: John Meredith
- Constituency: Deloraine
- In office 18 June 1868 – January 1869
- Preceded by: William Archer
- Succeeded by: Henry Douglas
- Constituency: Deloraine
- In office 8 September 1871 – September 1872
- Preceded by: Seat created
- Succeeded by: James Monaghan Dooley
- Constituency: East Devon

Personal details
- Born: Adolphus Frederick Rooke; 27 April 1814 Hartford, Cheshire, England
- Died: 12 December 1881 (aged 67) Deloraine, Tasmania
- Occupation: Farmer, brewer

Adolphus Frederick Rooke (27 April 1814 – 12 December 1881) was an English-born settler in Van Diemen's Land (later Tasmania) who worked as a brewer and farmer, and was one of the first members elected to the Tasmanian House of Assembly in 1856.

Rooke was born in Hartford, Cheshire in England, and emigrated to the colony of Van Diemen's Land around 1836. Acquiring large land holdings in Deloraine, Rooke concentrated on agriculture, working as a farmer and a brewer. In 1856, he acted on his considerable interest in politics and nominated as a candidate for the first Tasmanian colonial elections. He was elected unopposed as the member for Deloraine, which he held until his retirement in November 1862. In June 1868, he won the seat again but resigned after several months in January 1869. He took a third and final tilt at politics in 1871, holding the seat of East Devon from September 1871 to September 1872.

After leaving politics, Rooke was active in a proposal to construct a railway from Launceston to Deloraine, and was appointed as a director of the project. He was also added to the magisterial roll of the colony in 1869.

Rooke died at the age of 67 at his residence, "The Retreat", near Deloraine on 12 December 1881. He had been paralysed for twelve months prior to his death due to a serious accident.
