= Maxwell Miller (politician) =

Australian politician

Maxwell Miller (1832 – 10 April 1867) was a journalist and politician in colonial Tasmania.

Miller was born in London, England, the third son of Robert Miller, a barrister, and his wife Jane Matilde, née Montmorini. He was educated at St. Paul's School, whence he went up with a scholarship to Worcester College, Oxford. Here he gained the Fitzgerald scholarship, which transferred him to Queen's College. In 1852, at the instance of his elder brother William, who had emigrated to Victoria, he sailed for Melbourne.

Soon after Miller's arrival in Melbourne, Dr. Charles Perry, the then Anglican Bishop of Melbourne, offered him the appointment of Secretary to the Diocese. This office he held until he obtained one of the two Inspectorships of Education for Victoria, the other Inspector being Hugh Childers. He resigned this office to become one of the sub-editors of the Argus newspaper, and shortly after his brother William and he received an invitation to conduct a newspaper in Hobart, which was being started in the Liberal interest. The Tasmanian Daily News was the result, a paper which, though creditable for its literary matter and effective as a political weapon, ended in heavy pecuniary loss after two or three years' existence.

On the introduction of responsible government in 1856, Mr. Miller was returned to the Tasmanian House of Assembly as a member for Hobart Town, and soon made his mark as a debater. In conjunction with Mr. (later Sir F.) Smith, he introduced the scheme of Superior Education and endowed Tasmanian scholarships, which remained in force in the colony for some twenty-five years until the recent establishment of the Tasmanian University. Mr. Miller held office without portfolio in the short-lived ministry of Thomas Gregson, from 26 February to April 1857.

In 1863 Mr. Miller resigned his seat, and accepted the appointment of assistant-clerk to the House, an office which he held until within a short time of his death, which took place at Hobart on 10 April 1867. Miller was a brother of Robert Byron Miller. He was the author of The Tasmanian House of Assembly: A Metrical Catalogue (Hobart, 1860), a trenchant political satire.
