= Alfred Douglas (cricketer) =

Australian cricketer

Personal information
- Born: 4 February 1872; Newstead, Tasmania, Australia
- Died: 9 June 1938 (aged 66); Melbourne, Australia

Domestic team information
- Years: Team
- 1893-1896: Tasmania
- Source: Cricinfo, 16 January 2016

Alfred Douglas (4 February 1872 – 9 June 1938) was an Australian cricketer. He played three first-class matches for Tasmania between 1893 and 1896. He also played in a match between Lord Sheffield's English team and Tasmania. He also played football.

== See also ==
- List of Tasmanian representative cricketers
