= Robert Patten Adams =

Australian politician

Robert Patten Adams (4 March 1831 – 24 February 1911), was a politician and puisne judge in Tasmania.

== Background ==
Adams was the third son of James White Adams, of Martock, Somerset, and Mary Anne Elizabeth his wife. He was born on 4 March 1831, and educated at Martock Grammar School and at King's College School, London. He entered the legal profession at the Middle Temple in April 1851, and was called to the bar on 1 May 1854.

Adams emigrated to Tasmania, and was called to the bar there on 25 September 1856. He subsequently became Chairman of Quarter Sessions and a Commissioner of the Court of Requests for the northern division of Tasmania.

== Politics ==
Having embraced political life, he entered the House of Assembly, and was returned for Hobart Town in 1859, 1861, and from 1862 to 1866. He became Solicitor-General in 1867, and held the appointment till 1887, when on 14 March he was appointed a puisne judge. He was Chancellor of the Diocese of Tasmania.

== Family ==
Adams was married twice; his first wife, who died in 1867, being Harriett Matilda, daughter of the Captain George King, R.N. He then married Kate, daughter of the George Francis Huston, JP, of New Norfolk, Tasmania. Adams died aged 79, survived by several sons and daughters.
