= Robert Byron Miller =

Australian politician

Robert Byron Miller (19 April 1825 – 5 October 1902) was a lawyer and politician in colonial Tasmania.

Miller was born in London, England, the eldest son of Robert Miller, a barrister, and his wife Jane Matilde, née Montmorini. Miller had a younger brother, Maxwell Miller, who also became a Tasmanian politician. Miller was educated at private schools and King's College, London, and entered as a student at the Middle Temple in April 1843, and was called to the bar in January 1848.

Miller decided to emigrate to Tasmania, arriving at Hobart Town in January 1855; he was admitted a barrister in the Supreme Court of Tasmania in August 1855. Having entered Parliament on 31 May 1861 as member for Launceston. He was Solicitor-General in the Thomas Chapman ministry in 1862, and Attorney-General in the James Whyte Ministry from January 1863 to November 1866, and was sworn of the Executive Council. On 3 October 1866 he resigned his Launceston seat and successfully contested the seat of Hobart Town on 26 October 1866; holding that seat until resigning on 19 August 1867. He married, on 11 April 1855, Emily, third daughter of George Berkeley Harrison, of London.

Miller died in Launceston, Tasmania on 5 October 1902; he was survived by his wife, three sons and several daughters.
