= Electoral district of Glenorchy =

Former Tasmanian House of Assembly electoral district

The electoral district of Glenorchy was a single-member electoral district of the Tasmanian House of Assembly. It was based in the northern suburbs of Tasmania's capital city, Hobart, and included New Town, Moonah and Glenorchy.

The seat was created ahead of the Assembly's first election held in 1856, and was abolished when the Tasmanian parliament adopted the Hare-Clark electoral model in 1909.

== Members for Glenorchy ==
Member	Term
Sir Robert Officer	1856–1877
Alfred Dobson	1877–1887
John Hamilton	1887–1903
Frederick Rattle	1903–1909
