= Adye Douglas =

Australian politician (1815–1906)

Sir Adye Douglas
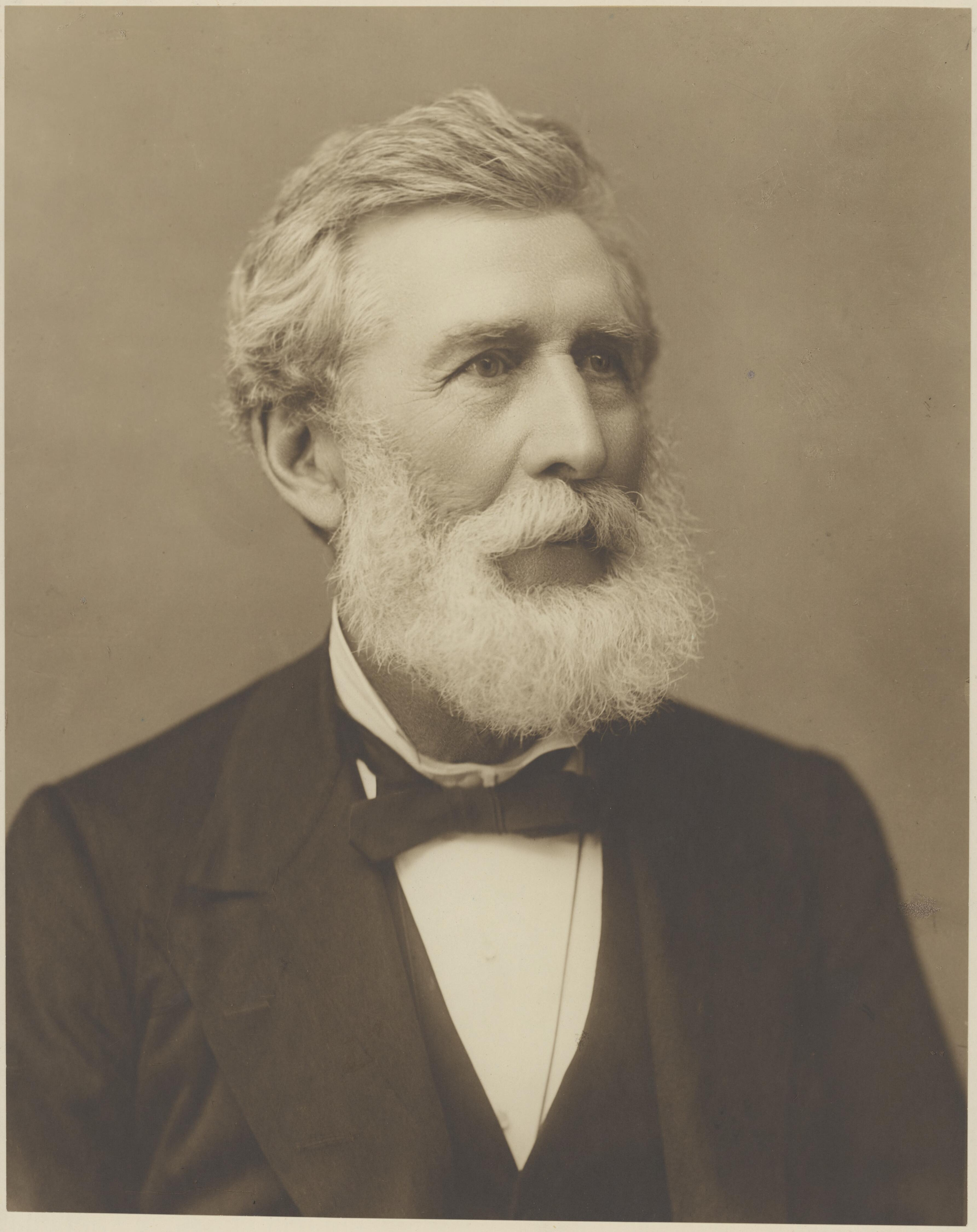
- Douglas c. 1900

15th Premier of Tasmania
- In office 15 August 1884 – 8 March 1886
- Preceded by: William Giblin
- Succeeded by: James Agnew
- Constituency: Launceston, Westbury, Norfolk Plains, Fingal

President of the Tasmanian Legislative Council
- In office 20 April 1894 – 2 May 1904
- Preceded by: William Moore
- Succeeded by: William Dodery

Personal details
- Born: 31 May 1815 Thorpe-next-Norwich, Norfolk, England, United Kingdom
- Died: 10 April 1906 (aged 90) Hobart, Tasmania, Australia
- Party: Separationist
- Spouse(s): Martha Matilda Collins (née Rolls), Charlotte Richards, Ida Richards
- Profession: Lawyer

Sir Adye Douglas (31 May 1815 – 10 April 1906) was an Australian lawyer and politician, and first class cricket player, who played one match for Tasmania. He was Premier of Tasmania from 15 August 1884 to 8 March 1886.

== Early life ==
The son of Captain Henry Osborne Douglas, and his wife Eleanor, Douglas was born in Thorpe, Norfolk, England of Scottish descent. His father was an army officer, but his grandfather, Billy Douglas was an admiral and five uncles were post-captains. Douglas was educated in Hampshire and Caen, France, before doing his articles with a Southampton law firm. He migrated to Van Diemen's Land (now Tasmania) aboard the Louisa Campbell in 1839.

== Early career ==
Douglas was admitted to the Supreme Court of Tasmania, but went to Victoria where he ran a sheep farm near Kilmore with his brother. He tired of farming, and in 1842 he returned to Launceston, where he established his own law firm, which still operates today.

Douglas was very interested in the development and welfare of the colony, and was a supporter of both the establishment of local responsible government and the name change from Van Diemens Land to Tasmania. He was also a strong advocate of the Anti-Transportation League.

== Cricket ==
Douglas is known to have played cricket in Launceston between the 1849–50 and 1851–52 seasons. He played his only first class cricket match at South Yarra Ground, Melbourne, on 29 and 30 March 1852 for Tasmania against Victoria. He scored a duck in the first innings, and 6 in the second and did not take a wicket in his two overs in Victoria's second innings.

== Later career ==
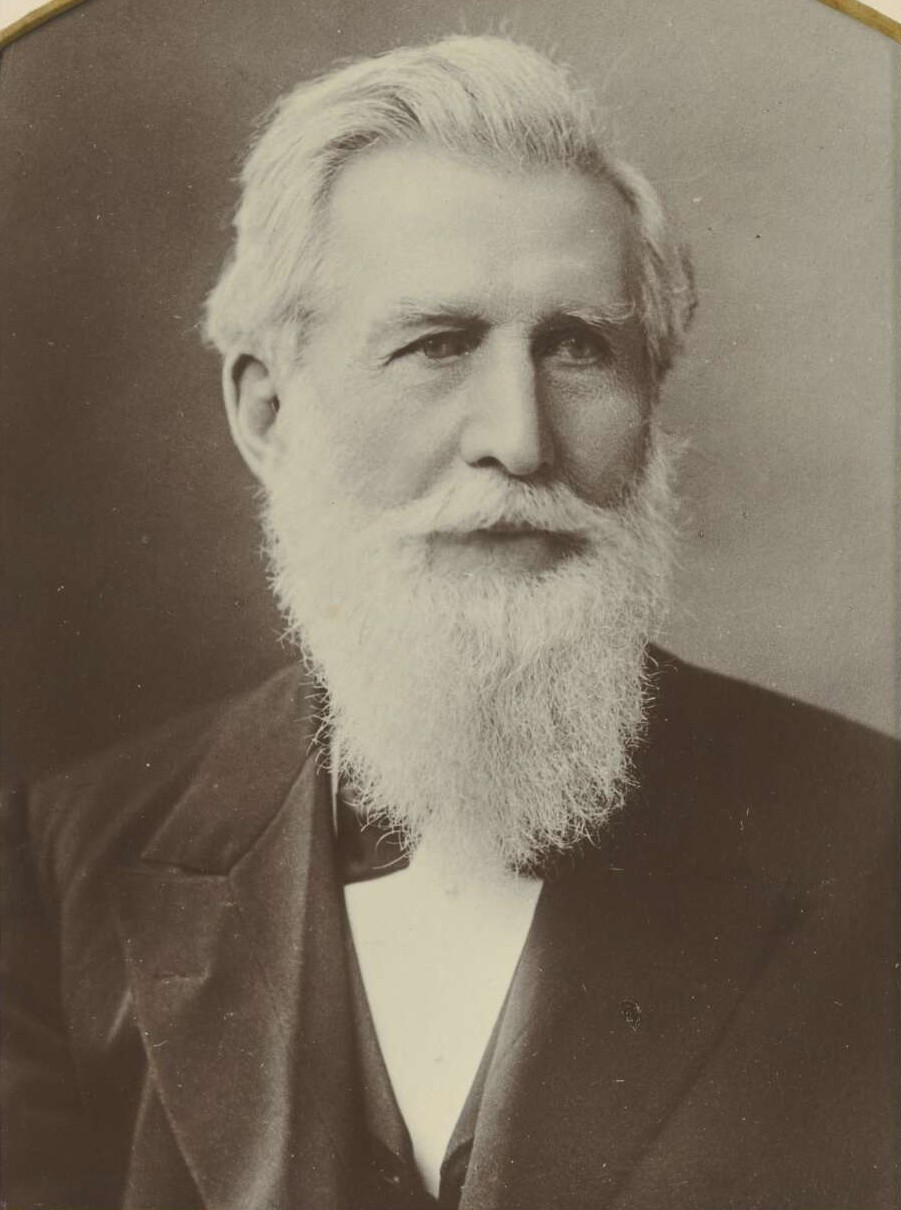
Douglas in 1898

Douglas was elected as an alderman of Launceston in 1853, and served until 1884, including two terms as mayor from 1865 to 1866, and 1880–1882.

In 1856 Douglas was one of the first representatives elected to Tasmania's new House of Assembly, but was soon frustrated by lack of support. He resigned in 1857 to travel in North America, France, and England, before soon returning to Tasmania.

Whilst abroad, Douglas had been impressed by the development of railways in those places, and felt strongly that Tasmania needed to develop its own railways. He failed to gain support for the development of a Hobart to Launceston railway, but did push through a Launceston to Deloraine railway, the Launceston and Western Railway.

He was a major shareholder in the Ilfacombe Iron Company, a venture to smelt iron ore in Northern Tasmania in 1873, and after its failure was the buyer of its assets. He was also one of the buyers of the assets and iron ore mining leases of the Tamar Hematite Iron Company, in 1877, part of a highly unethical, though technically legal, ploy to obtain cheaply a pre-emptive right to a valuable gold mining lease. Despite its dubious origins, the lease—adjacent to the bountiful Tasmania Mine—was lucrative for its new owners. The whole scheme had depended upon the operation of a piece of new legislation (Mineral Lands Act of 1877) that had just been voted upon in the Tasmanian Parliament, by four of the five new owners—like Douglas, wealthy Tasmanian politicians. It can now be seen as an early instance of a conflict of interest, amounting to political corruption.

Douglas was a member of the Tasmanian House of Assembly from 1862 until 1884, when he became a member of the Tasmanian Legislative Council instead. He served as Premier of Tasmania from 1884 until 1886.

Douglas represented Tasmania at the Federal Council of Australasia, and was elected as one of the ten Tasmanian delegates to the Federal Convention of Australasia. There he epitomised conservative opinion within the convention. More than any other delegate, Douglas voted against what Alfred Deakin voted for; in fact, no other pair of delegates differed more in their votes than these two. For all his evident conservatism, Douglas recommended a Yes vote in the Federation referendums, and favoured the establishment of an Australian Republic.

Douglas resigned as Premier in 1886 to take up a post as Tasmanian Agent-General in London, but was soon recalled due to problems with his railway associations in Tasmania. He returned to the Tasmanian Legislative Council from 1890 to 1904, and was made a knight bachelor on 14 August 1902, being described as "The first amongst the Tasmanians", by then Governor of Tasmania, Captain Sir Arthur Havelock.

== Personal life ==
In 1836 Douglas married Eliza Clarke and she died in 1839. In 1858 Douglas married Martha Matilda Collins (née Rolls) and she died in 1872 in Launceston, Tasmania. In 1873, he married Charlotte Richards, and they had a daughter Eleanor (1873–1936), and Charlotte died in 1876. In 1877, he married Charlotte's sister, Ida, in Adelaide, and they had four sons, and four daughters.. His son by his third marriage, Osborne Douglas played first-class cricket for Tasmania between 1898–99 and 1904–05 and was killed on active service in France in 1918 during World War I. A step-son, William Collins, also played for the Tasmanian team in 1873, and his nephew, William Douglas was born in Tasmania and played one first-class cricket match for Otago in New Zealand in the 1870s. A great-nephew Alfred Douglas played three matches for Tasmania during the 1890s.

Sir Adye Douglas died on 10 April 1906 at Hobart, aged 90 years and 314 days.

== See also ==
- List of Tasmanian representative cricketers

Political offices
Preceded by William Giblin	Premier of Tasmania; 1884 – 1886	Succeeded by James Agnew
Tasmanian Legislative Council
Preceded by William Moore	President of the Tasmanian Legislative Council; 1894–1904	Succeeded by William Dodery
Preceded by Richard Dry	Member for Launceston; 1855–1856; Served alongside: Ronald Gunn	Abolished
Preceded by Charles Leake	Member for South Esk; 1884–1886	Succeeded by James Gibson
Preceded by John Scott	Member for Launceston; 1890–1904; Served alongside: William Hart	Succeeded by Charles Russen
