= Electoral district of Clarence (Tasmania) =

Former electoral district in Tasmania, Australia

The electoral district of Clarence was a single-member electoral district of the Tasmanian House of Assembly. It was based in the region across the River Derwent from Hobart in what is now the eastern suburbs, including Bellerive and Rokeby as well as the South Arm Peninsula.

The seat was created ahead of the Assembly's first election held in 1856, and was abolished at the 1886 election.

== Members for Clarence ==
Member	Term
Edward Abbott	1856–1864
David Lewis	1864–1877
Henry Lamb	1877–1886
