= Electoral district of Deloraine =

Former colonial/state electoral district of Tasmania

The electoral district of Deloraine was a single-member electoral district of the Tasmanian House of Assembly. Its population centre was the town of Deloraine in Tasmania's northeast, situated between the centres of Launceston and Devonport.

The seat was created ahead of the Assembly's first election held in 1856, and was abolished when the Tasmanian parliament adopted the Hare-Clark electoral model in 1909.

== Members for Deloraine ==
Member	Term
Adolphus Rooke	1856–1862
John Meredith	1862–1863
Charles Grant	1863–1866
William Archer	1866–1868
Adolphus Rooke	1868–1869
Henry Douglas	1869–1871
Samuel Shorey	1871–1872
Samuel Henry	1872–1880
William Sleigh	1880–1882
Henry Rooke	1882–1886
John Hart	1886–1893
Norman Cameron	1893–1894
Jonathan Best	1894–1897
Norman Cameron	1897–1899
Jonathan Best	1899–1909
