= John Davies (publisher) =

Australian newspaper editor (1814–1872)

John Davies (10 June 1814 – 11 June 1872) co-founded the Australian newspaper The Mercury.

Davies was born in London, England. He was transported to Hobart, Australia as a convict in August 1831, for ordering candles on someone else's account. His father had been transported to New South Wales only a few years before.

On 5 July 1854 he and Auber George Jones, a Tasmanian pastoralist, published the first edition of The Mercury.

In 1871 Davies passed the management of The Mercury to his sons. In June 1872 he opened up the theatre building (which he then owned) to homeless people seeking temporary shelter due to floods. He caught a chill from which he died on 11 June 1872.

Davies' son John played first-class cricket for Tasmania and was thrice Mayor of Hobart.

== Sources ==
- Boyer, P. (1981) "Davies, Sir John George (1846 – 1913)", Australian Dictionary of Biography, vol. 8, Melbourne University Press.
