= Solicitor-General of Tasmania =

Law officer for Tasmania

- Coat of arms of Tasmania
- Incumbent; Mrs Sarah Kay SC since January 2022
- Reports to: Cabinet
- Appointer: Governor of Tasmania; With advice and consent of the Attorney-General
- Term length: 10 years
- Formation: 1983 (Modern) 1825 (Historical)

The Solicitor-General of Tasmania is the second law officer for Tasmania. Their duties are primarily providing legal advice to the Government of Tasmania. The Solicitor-General leads the Solicitor-General's Office, which is made up of two sections led by Assistant Solicitors General: Advisings and Litigation. They are housed in the Executive Building at 15 Murray Street, Hobart.

== History ==
The office has existed since 1825, largely mirroring practices in the United Kingdom where it was given to a member of the cabinet. In 1863 a Royal Commission concluded that the office should become a non-political and non-ministerial office. It was the primary office for legal administration until 1934, when the Attorney-General's Department was created, after which the office has been responsible for advising ministers and agencies. The Solicitor-General Act 1983 was passed in 1963, which established the office under statute.
