= William Dodery =

Australian politician (1819–1912)

William Dodery (August 1819 – 26 January 1912) was an Australian politician.

Born in Clonmel, County Tipperary, Ireland, Dodery arrived in Sydney (New South Wales) with his father in 1825, and then moved to Launceston (Van Diemen's Land) six years later. He married Mary Webb at Longford in 1842 and became a land-owner and business proprietor, building the Blenheim Hotel there and establishing a coach-line for passengers between Launceston and the town.

He was elected to the House of Assembly for Norfolk Plains in 1861, and was re-elected in November 1862 and in October 1866, serving until his resignation in 1870 due to business commitments.

In March 1877 he returned to political life and was elected to the Tasmanian Legislative Council seat of Longford, continuing when his seat was redistributed as Westmorland in 1885. Dodery was re-elected a number of times before retiring from the Parliament on 7 May 1907 having served as President of the Legislative Council since 1904.

Dodery died in Longford, Tasmania, Australia on 26 January 1912.

Tasmanian House of Assembly
Preceded by John Archer	Member for Norfolk Plains; 1861–1870	Succeeded by Charles Rocher
Tasmanian Legislative Council
Preceded by Edward Weston	Member for Longford; 1877–1885	Division abolished
New seat	Member for Westmorland; 1885–1907	Succeeded by John Cheek
Political offices
Preceded by Sir Adye Douglas	President of the Tasmanian Legislative Council; 1904–1907	Succeeded by Tetley Gant
