= Thomas Chapman (Australian politician) =

Australian politician

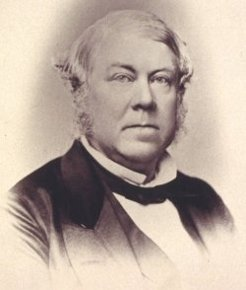

5th Premier of Tasmania
- In office 2 August 1861 – 20 January 1863
- Preceded by: William Weston
- Succeeded by: James Whyte

President of the Tasmanian Legislative Council
- In office 11 July 1882 – 17 February 1884
- Preceded by: Frederick Innes
- Succeeded by: Walter Gellibrand

Personal details
- Born: 31 October 1815 Biggleswade, Bedfordshire, England, United Kingdom
- Died: 17 February 1884 (aged 68) New Town, Tasmania
- Spouse: Katherine Swan

Thomas Daniel Chapman (31 October 1815 (Note: His exact birth year is unclear but 1815 is widely accepted, although his baptism date is registered as 18 Dec 1814 (Biggleswade, Bedfordshire); this article uses the birth year from the "Chapman, Thomas". Members of the Parliament of Tasmania.) – 17 February 1884) was the Premier of Tasmania from 2 August 1861 until 20 January 1863. He served as a member of the Tasmanian Parliament for 26 years from August 1856 until his death in 1884. (Note: Chapman served 26 years because for a period of time 1864-1866 he was not a member of parliament due to bankruptcy)

== Early life ==
Born in 1814 to William and Mary Chapman, he was the youngest of seven children. His father was a solicitor, however was an innkeeper at the time of Thomas’s birth.

Chapman immigrated to Tasmania at around 1841 with his younger brother George (George returned to England after having married in Tasmania). He set up a business in Hobart and became a leading merchant during the early 1850s. He married Catherine Swan and had four daughters and five sons. Chapman was an advocate against the transportation of convicts to Van Diemens Land (Tasmania).

== Political career ==
Chapman was first elected to the Tasmanian Legislative Council in 1851. When the Tasmanian House of Assembly was created in 1856 Chapman became a minister under Tasmania's first responsible government headed by William Champ. He was made Colonial Treasurer and upon taking the position realised that the estimated budget of the state was not £330,000 but only £250,000. To fix the deficit Chapman proposed increasing taxes and reducing the wages of public servants, a proposal which reduced his popularity. After William Champ's ministry was defeated in 1857, his position as Treasurer was given to another member of parliament.

Chapman was in opposition during the Gregson, Weston and Smith ministries. Or from 1857 after Champ's resignation, until 1861.

Chapman became Premier after four years out of ministry, on 2 August 1861 he held office until 20 January 1863 a total of 18 months making him the second longest serving Premier after Francis Smith at the time. While Premier he also took up his old job of Colonial treasurer from November, 1862 until January, 1863.

Although his term as Premier ended he became Colonial Treasurer again in Richard Dry's ministry from 24 November 1866 until 1869. He also held the position in Wilson's ministry from 1869–1872. In 1873 he resigned from the House of Assembly to become a member of the Legislative Council. In August, 1873 he joined Alfred Kennerley's ministry holding the position of Colonial Secretary from 1873 until 1876. After this Chapman served in no more ministries but was President of the Tasmanian Legislative Council on 11 July 1882 until his death.

Chapman is noted as being a good public speaker and an excellent financier.

== Electorates ==
During his time in parliament; Chapman served in six electorates, in both chambers.

=== Tasmanian House of Assembly ===
- Hobart Town from 15 September 1856 until 31 May 1861. (Note: Many of these electorates no longer exist they are based on the towns of Hobart, Launceston and Campbell Town. Sources of the electoral terms are located at "Chapman, Thomas". Members of the Parliament of Tasmania.)
- Queenborough from 11 June 1861 until 8 November 1862.
- Campbell Town from 8 November 1862 until May, 1864. Resigned because of bankruptcy
- Hobart Town from 27 October 1866 until 3 December 1866.
- Launceston from 31 December 1866 until August, 1871.
- East Hobart from 1 September 1871 until August, 1873. Resigned to contest in Tasmanian Legislative Council.

=== Tasmanian Legislative Council ===
- Buckingham from 28 October 1851 until August, 1856. Resigned to contest in the Tasmanian House of Assembly.
- Buckingham from 8 August 1873 until 17 February 1884.

== Notes ==
Political offices
Preceded by William Weston	Premier of Tasmania; 1861–1863	Succeeded by James Whyte
Tasmanian Legislative Council
Preceded by Frederick Innes	President of the Tasmanian Legislative Council; 1882–1884	Succeeded by Walter Gellibrand
Preceded by Philip Fysh	Member for Buckingham; 1873–1884	Succeeded by Philip Fysh
