= Thomas Smart (Tasmanian politician) =

Australian politician and doctor

Thomas Christie Smart (1816 – 26 March 1896) was a doctor and politician in colonial Tasmania, member of the Tasmanian Legislative Council.

Smart was born in Scotland and became a licentiate of the Royal College of Surgeons in 1842. Later in 1842 he emigrated to Australia and was elected to the Tasmanian Legislative Council for Hobart on 8 March 1881, resigning on 8 February 1886. Smart became a fellow of the Royal College of Surgeons of Edinburgh in 1875. Smart was also Chairman of the Hobart Hospital Board and chairman of directors of the Eldon Ranges Gold Prospecting Co.
