= William Giblin =

Australian politician (1840–1887)

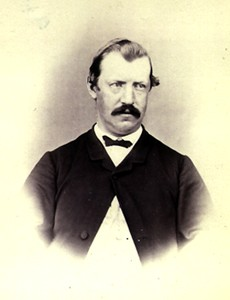

13th Premier of Tasmania
- In office 5 March 1878 – 20 December 1878
- Preceded by: Philip Fysh
- Succeeded by: William Crowther
- In office 30 October 1879 – 15 August 1884
- Preceded by: William Crowther
- Succeeded by: Adye Douglas

Personal details
- Born: 4 November 1840 Hobart, Van Diemen's Land
- Died: 17 January 1887 (aged 46) Hobart, Tasmania
- Spouse: Emily Jean Perkins
- Children: Lyndhurst Giblin

William Robert Giblin (4 November 1840 – 17 January 1887) was Premier of Tasmania (Australia) from 5 March 1878 until 20 December 1878 and from 1879 until 1884.

The banker and cricketer Vincent Wanostrocht Giblin (1817–1884) was a nephew, and many other members of the Giblin family were prominent in Tasmanian society.

== Early life ==
Giblin was born on 4 November 1840 in Hobart, Van Diemen's Land. He was the son of Marion (née Falkiner) and William Giblin. His father was clerk of the registrar of deeds.

Giblin was educated privately by his uncle and also attended the Hobart High School. He left school at the age of thirteen and began working for Allport & Roberts, a legal firm in Hobart. He served articles of clerkship with John Roberts and was called to the bar in 1864.

Political offices
Preceded by Philip Fysh	Premier of Tasmania; 1878	Succeeded by William Crowther
Preceded by William Crowther	Premier of Tasmania; 1879–1884	Succeeded by Adye Douglas
