= William Lambert Dobson =

Australian politician (1833–1898)

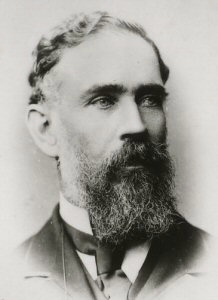
- Born: 24 April 1833; England
- Died: 17 March 1898 (aged 64); Australia
- Occupations: politician and Chief Justice of Tasmania

Sir William Lambert Dobson KCMG FLS (24 April 1833 – 17 March 1898) was an English-born Australian politician, a Leader of the Opposition and Chief Justice of Tasmania (Australia).

== Early life ==
Dobson was born at Carr Hill, Gateshead, Durham, England, the elder son of John Dobson, a solicitor at Gateshead, and his first wife Mary Ann, née Atkinson (1811–1837). William was full brother to Frank and half-brother to Alfred and Henry Dobson.

== Brothers ==
One of Dobson's brothers Henry (1841 – 1918) was a premier of Tasmania. Another brother, Frank (1835–95) was a Solicitor-General of Victoria from 1881 to 1883, while a third brother, Alfred (1848–1908), was Attorney-General in the first Philip Fysh ministry from 1877 to 1878, leader of the opposition 1883 to 1884, and speaker of the house from July 1885 to 1887.

Legal offices
Preceded by Sir Francis Smith	Chief Justice of Tasmania; 1885-1898	Succeeded by Sir John Dodds
