= List of World Heritage Sites in Oceania =

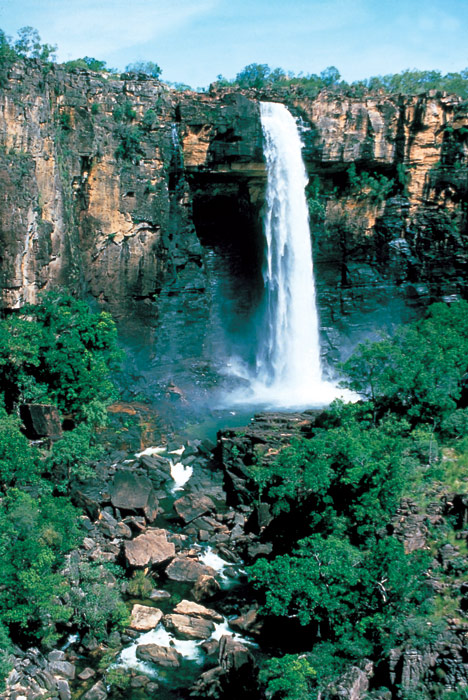
Kakadu National Park, one of the first sites in Oceania to be inscribed as a World Heritage Site

A World Heritage Site is a location that is listed by UNESCO as having outstanding cultural or natural value to the common heritage of humanity. The World Heritage Committee has designated 37 World Heritage Sites in Oceania. These are in 14 countries, with the majority of sites located in Australia. The first three inscriptions from the region, the Great Barrier Reef, Kakadu National Park and the Willandra Lakes, were in 1981—three years after the list's creation. The region contains the world's three largest sites: Phoenix Islands Protected Area, Papahānaumokuākea, and the Great Barrier Reef. In addition, the Tasmanian Wilderness is one of only two sites that meet seven out of the ten criteria for World Heritage listing (Mount Tai in China being the other).

Each year, the World Heritage Committee may inscribe new sites on the list, or delist sites that no longer meet the criteria. Selection is based on ten criteria: six for cultural heritage (i–vi) and four for natural heritage (vii–x). Some sites, designated mixed sites, represent both cultural and natural heritage. In Oceania there are 11 cultural, 19 natural and 7 mixed sites. UNESCO may also specify that a site is in danger, stating "conditions which threaten the very characteristics for which a property was inscribed on the World Heritage List." In 2013, the Committee added East Rennell to the List of World Heritage in Danger because of the threat of logging activities to the site's outstanding universal value.

== Legend ==
The list below includes all sites located geographically within Oceania, and is constructed without reference to UNESCO's statistical divisions. The list comprises a number of sites for which the state party is outside the region, but the site itself is located in Oceania; this includes sites belonging to Chile (Rapa Nui National Park), France (Lagoons of New Caledonia and Taputapuātea), the United Kingdom (Henderson Island), and the United States (Hawaii Volcanoes National Park, Papahānaumokuākea).

Site – named after the World Heritage Committee's official designation.
Location – sorted by country, followed by the region at the regional or provincial level. In the case of multinational or multi-regional sites, the names are sorted alphabetically.
Criteria – as defined by the World Heritage Committee.
Area – in hectares and acres, excluding any buffer zones. A value of zero implies that no data has been published by UNESCO.
Year – during which the site was inscribed to the World Heritage List.
Description – brief information about the site. None of the sites in this list have been classified as endangered.

† In danger

== Sites ==
Site	Image	Location	Criteria	Area ha (acre)	Year	Description
Australian Convict Sites	Photo of the main penitentiary building, partially ruined and hollowed out, with thickly forested hills in background	New South Wales, Norfolk Island, Tasmania and Western Australia, Australia; 33°22′42″S 150°59′40″E (Note: Coordinates indicate the location of the Great North Road, one of several, widely scattered locations in the Australian Convict Sites.)	Cultural: (iv), (vi)	1,503 (3,710)	2010	There are over 3,000 convict sites remaining in Australia, which were established by the British Fleets in the early colonial period of Australia's history. Eleven of these sites were selected as the most outstanding examples in the country. (Note: The sites are: Cockatoo Island Convict Site, Hyde Park Barracks, Old Government House and the Great North Road in New South Wales; Brickendon and Woolmers Estates, Cascades Female Factory, Coal Mines Historic Site, Darlington Probation Station and Port Arthur in Tasmania; Fremantle Prison in Western Australia and Kingston and Arthurs Vale Historic Area on Norfolk Island.)
Australian Fossil Mammal Sites (Riversleigh / Naracoorte)	Upright reconstruction of a Thylacoleo skeleton inside Naracoorte Caves, its shadow cast against the cave wall	Queensland and South Australia, Australia; 19°05′00″S 138°43′00″E (Note: Coordinates indicate the location of Riversleigh, one of two, widely spaced locations in the Australian Fossil Mammal Sites.)	Natural: (viii), (ix)	10,300 (25,000)	1992	Riversleigh and Naracoorte were inscribed for their extensive fossil records, and are listed among the ten richest deposits in the world. Both are illustrative of separate, key stages in the evolution of mammals on the Australian continent. Riversleigh has provided some of the earliest mammalian records from the middle Cenozoic. The deposit at Naracoorte, Australia's largest, spans the much-more-recent Pleistocene epoch and the first migrations of humans to Australia. It contains some of the best-preserved examples of ice-age megafauna.
Bikini Atoll Nuclear Test Site	Black-and-white snapshot of a large atomic mushroom cloud rising from the ocean	Ralik Chain, Marshall Islands; 11°36′00″N 165°22′50″E	Cultural: (iv), (vi)	0.97 (2.4)	2010	A total of 67 nuclear weapons tests were conducted here by the United States between 1946 and 1958, including the detonation of the first hydrogen bomb in 1952. The tests had significant consequences on the health of the surrounding environment and its inhabitants. The fallout from the Castle Bravo explosion in 1954 led to the most significant radiological contamination in U.S. history. The site contains many visible remains of the effects of nuclear testing.
Budj Bim Cultural Landscape		Victoria, Australia; 38°04′52″S 141°53′07″E	Cultural: (iii), (v)	9,935 (24,550)	2019	Located on the traditional lands of the Gunditjmara people, the Budj Bim Cultural Landscape consists of three components that make up one of the world's most extensive and oldest aquaculture systems in the world. Lava flows from the nearby Budj Bim helped to provide a complex landscape of channels, weirs and dams that became the base for Gunditjmara society for six millennia. The ongoing relationship is kept alive through knowledge systems retained by oral transmission and cultural practice.
Chief Roi Mata's Domain	Covered opening to Fels Cave on Lelepa Island, where Roy Mata died in 1265	Shefa, Vanuatu; 17°37′41″S 168°10′40″E	Cultural: (iii), (v), (vi)	886 (2,190)	2008	Consists of three sites on the islands of Efate, Lelepa and Artok associated with Roy Mata, a 13th-century paramount chief whose social reforms have remained relevant to contemporary local society. It includes his residence in the abandoned settlement of Mangaas, the site of his death on Lelepa, and his burial site on the island of Artok.
East Rennell^{†}	Man paddling a wooden dugout canoe on a flat lagoon surrounded by palm trees	Rennell and Bellona, Solomon Islands; 11°41′00″S 160°20′00″E	Natural: (ix)	37,000 (91,000)	1998	Rennell Island is the world's largest raised coral atoll. It is heavily forested and hosts high levels of endemism. The southern portion of the atoll surrounds its former lagoon, Tegano, which is now the largest lake in the Pacific Ocean.
Gondwana Rainforests of Australia	Thick forests covering a rocky escarpment	Queensland and New South Wales, Australia; 28°15′S 150°03′E	Natural: (viii), (ix), (x)	370,000 (910,000)	1986	This site was inscribed for its significance for geology and conservation. It covers a large number of protected areas in what is the most extensive area of subtropical rainforest in the world. It has an extremely high conservation value, with more than 200 rare or threatened plant and animal species.
Great Barrier Reef	A submerged outcrop covered by a variety of corals	Queensland, Australia; 18°17′10″S 147°42′00″E	Natural: (vii), (viii), (ix), (x)	34,870,000 (86,200,000)	1981	The world's largest coral reef system, composed of over 2,900 individual reefs. It hosts an outstanding level of marine biodiversity and is considered likely to be the richest area in the world in terms of animal diversity. It is home to approximately 400 types of coral, and forms a critical habitat for many endangered species.
Greater Blue Mountains Area	Rugged sandstone cliff face with three large pinnacles, surrounded by a forested valley	New South Wales, Australia; 33°42′S 150°00′E	Natural: (ix), (x)	1,032,649 (2,551,730)	2000	An area of sandstone tablelands and gorges. Covered by eucalypt forest, the area was inscribed as a representation of Australia's biodiversity, with particular regard to the diversity of eucalypt species. It is composed of eight protected areas providing crucial habitats for many endangered species.
Hawaii Volcanoes National Park	Aerial photograph of volcanic rock, with black cold lava split by a bright river of red lava	Hawaiʻi, United States; 19°24′03″N 155°07′25″W	Natural: (viii)	92,934 (229,640)	1987	Located on Hawaiʻi Island, it is home to two of the world's most active volcanoes: Kilauea and Mauna Loa. As constant volcanic activity is easily observed, the area has provided scientific insight into the processes of volcanism, including the birth of the Hawaiʻian Islands.
Heard and McDonald Islands	Satellite image of a snow-covered volcanic peak, with a glacier running straight into the ocean	Heard and McDonald Islands, Australia; 53°06′S 73°30′E	Natural: (viii), (ix)	37,200 (92,000)	1997	These two islands are the only two active volcanoes in the subantarctic, and were inscribed for their value to research in glaciology and geomorphic processes. Over three-quarters of Heard Island is covered by glaciers. Because of their remoteness, the ecosystem is undisturbed, with no history of significant human impact or any introduced species.
Henderson Island	Parallel view down a sandy beach backed by shrub-covered cliffs, with a large shrub in the foreground and the ocean to the right	Pitcairn Islands, United Kingdom; 24°22′00″S 128°20′00″W	Natural: (vii), (x)	3,700 (9,100)	1988	One of the most remote islands in the world, Henderson is home to an ecosystem undisturbed by human activity and hosting multiple endemic species. It was inscribed as a tremendous value to natural science, providing the opportunity to study the dynamics of an isolated ecosystem.
Kakadu National Park	Overhead view of grassy wetlands, with a river cutting through and a forested escarpment to the right	Northern Territory, Australia; 12°50′00″S 132°50′00″E	Mixed: (i), (vi), (vii), (ix), (x)	1,979,766 (4,892,110)	1981	Kakadu's wetlands, covering over a third of the park, are considered internationally important. Several archaeological sites provide evidence of the area's habitation for more than 40,000 years. The pictographs at Ubirr, Burrunggui and Nanguluwu are internationally recognised as outstanding examples of ancient rock art, dating from over 18,000 years ago.
Fraser Island	A grassy hilltop overlooking a shallow sand beach, with thick forests in the background	Queensland, Australia; 25°13′00″S 153°08′00″E	Natural: (vii), (viii), (ix)	184,000 (450,000)	1992	Fraser Island is the world's largest sand island, composed of sand accumulated over approximately 750,000 years. It contains over 100 freshwater lakes, and dunes reaching up to 260 m (850 ft) above sea level. Due to naturally occurring mycorrhizal fungi present in the sand, it is the only place in the world where tall rainforest grows on sand.
Kuk Early Agricultural Site	Satellite image of a green valley dominated by farming and agriculture	Western Highlands, Papua New Guinea; 5°47′01″S 144°19′54″E	Cultural: (iii), (iv)	116 (290)	2008	Archaeological surveys at Kuk Swamp have provided evidence of primitive irrigation and cultivation systems from about 9,000 years ago, making it one of the earliest sites for the development of agriculture in the world.
Lagoons of New Caledonia: Reef Diversity and Associated Ecosystems	Satellite image of the tip of a large island fringed by barrier reefs, with different hues of blue showing the immediate difference in water depth created by the reefs	New Caledonia, France; 20°24′43″S 164°33′59″E	Natural: (vii), (ix), (x)	1,574,300 (3,890,000)	2008	One of the three largest reef systems in the world, enclosing a lagoon area of 24,000 km^{2} (9,300 sq mi). The density of reef structures here is the most diverse in the world. It host a great diversity of species with a high level of endemism, and is an important habitat for endangered dugongs and sea turtles.
Levuka Historical Port Town		Eastern Division, Fiji; 17°41′00″S 178°50′04″E	Cultural: (ii), (iv)	70 (170)	2013	The town of Levuka, on the eastern beachfront of Ovalau, was the first site of European settlement in Fiji, becoming the British colonial capital of Fiji in 1874. The numerous and well-preserved buildings of the era, make it an excellent example of a colonial port developed during the late 19th century in the South Pacific.
Lord Howe Island Group	View overlooking a sheltered shallow bay, with a reef extending out to two bald peaks in the background	New South Wales, Australia; 31°33′56″S 159°05′18″E	Natural: (vii), (x)	1,540 (3,800)	1982	This island is the eroded remains of a seven-million-year-old shield volcano, the product of eruptions that lasted for about a half-million years. It is home to numerous endemic species, significant breeding colonies of seabirds, and the world's southernmost coral reef.
Macquarie Island	Large rookery of king penguins, both adult and young, on a pebbled beach, with grassy hills in background	Tasmania, Australia; 54°35′41″S 158°53′44″E	Natural: (vii), (viii)	540,000 (1,300,000)	1997	Lying atop a segment of the Macquarie Ridge, the island is the only place on earth where the mantle is exposed above sea level. It contains evidence of seafloor spreading. It was inscribed for its unique geological value.
Marquesas Islands		French Polynesia, French Polynesia; 9°27′00″S 139°23′00″W	Mixed: (iii), (vi), (vii), (ix), (x)	345,750 (854,400)	2024	A hotspot of biodiversity that combines irreplaceable and exceptionally well conserved marine and terrestrial ecosystems. Marked by sharp ridges, impressive peaks and cliffs rising abruptly above the ocean, the landscapes of the archipelago are unparalleled in these tropical latitudes. The archipelago is a major centre of endemism, home to rare and diverse flora, a diversity of emblematic marine species, and one of the most diverse seabird assemblages in the South Pacific. Virtually free from human exploitation, Marquesan waters are among the world's last marine wilderness areas. The property also includes archaeological sites ranging from monumental dry-stone structures to lithic sculptures and engravings.
Murujuga Cultural Landscape		Western Australia, Australia20°33′06″S 116°50′09″E	Cultural: (i), (iii), (v)	30,000 (74,000)	2025	Murujuga is a deeply storied land and seascape located in northwest Australia. It encompasses the Burrup Peninsula, the Dampier Archipelago, surrounding marine areas and the submerged landscape. Murujuga is shaped by the Lore — rules and narratives put in place to create the Country — and the enduring presence of the Ngarda-Ngarli, Traditional Owners and Custodians of the site. The property holds profound cultural and spiritual significance, reflecting over 50,000 years of continuous care and management by Traditional Law that has adapted to the changing needs of Country over periods of dramatic climatic and environmental change. Murujuga is renowned for its dense concentration of archaeological and spiritual sites that reflect the interaction between people and place over thousands of generations. Its extraordinary rock art assemblage records a complex system of Lore and Traditional Law, features unique motifs and demonstrates artistic and technical mastery.
Nan Madol^{†}	The ruins of Nan Madol on the island of Pohnpei	Pohnpei, Federated States of Micronesia; 6°50′23″N 158°19′51″E	Cultural: (i), (iii), (iv), (vi)	76.7 (190)	2016	Nan Madol is a series of more than 100 islets off the south-east coast of Pohnpei that were constructed with walls of basalt and coral boulders. These islets harbour the remains of stone palaces, temples, tombs and residential domains built between 1200 and 1500 CE. These ruins represent the ceremonial centre of the Saudeleur dynasty, a vibrant period in Pacific Island culture. The huge scale of the edifices, their technical sophistication and the concentration of megalithic structures bear testimony to complex social and religious practices of the island societies of the period. The site was also inscribed on the List of World Heritage in Danger due to threats, notably the siltation of waterways that is contributing to the unchecked growth of mangroves and undermining existing edifices.
New Zealand Sub-Antarctic Islands	An albatross, white with grey wings and long yellow beak, nesting amid grass	Outlying Islands, New Zealand; 50°45′00″S 166°06′16″E (Note: Coordinates indicate the location of the Auckland Islands, one of five, widely spaced island groups in the New Zealand Sub-Antarctic Islands.)	Natural: (ix), (x)	76,458 (188,930)	1998	Comprising the Antipodes Islands, Auckland Islands, Bounty Islands, Campbell Islands and The Snares. The islands are noted for the diversity and density of wildlife, with high levels of endemism. They are critical breeding ground for a range of species, and host huge breeding colonies of seabirds, penguins and sea lions.
Ningaloo Coast	Side-on view of a spotted whale shark in cloudy blue water	Western Australia, Australia; 22°33′45″S 113°48′37″E	Natural: (vii), (x)	705,015 (1,742,130)	2011	Noted for its exceptional marine biodiversity, including over 700 fish species and an abundance of endangered sea turtles. It hosts the largest known seasonal aggregations of whale sharks and is part of the annual migration routes of dolphins, dugongs, manta rays and humpback whales.
Papahānaumokuākea	Red pencil urchin submerged in shallow, glassy water, on a bed of coral	Hawaii, United States; 25°21′N 170°9′W	Mixed: (iii), (vi) (viii), (ix), (x)	36,207,499 (89,470,680)	2010	This chain of islands was formed as a result of hotspot volcanism. It supports almost 7,000 marine species, one quarter of which are endemic, and is critical to the survival of several endangered species. The islands are spiritually significant to many Native Hawaiians, being associated with the concept of kinship between man and nature. Two of the islands contain well-preserved heiau shrines.
Phoenix Islands Protected Area	Bed of colourful assorted corals, with view looking up to the surface scattered with fish	Phoenix Islands, Kiribati; 3°38′59″S 172°51′27″W	Natural: (vii), (ix)	40,825,000 (100,880,000)	2010	Encompassing the sparsely inhabited, inhospitable Phoenix Islands, this reserve protects one of the world's largest oceanic wildernesses. It covers a variety of marine habitats, and forms a major breeding ground on the migration routes of several marine and seabird species. It is considered to be of vital significance in evaluating the consequences of climate change on sea levels and the health of coral reefs.
Purnululu National Park	Large red sandstone rock formation surrounded by shrubbery and open plains	Western Australia, Australia; 17°30′S 128°30′E	Natural: (vii), (viii)	239,723 (592,370)	2003	The Bungle Bungle Range is a Devonian plateau that has been heavily eroded into a dramatic landscape of conical sandstone towers. It is one of the largest network of sandstone karst formations in the world, parts of which are sacred to the indigenous Kija people.
Rapa Nui National Park	Row of six large stone statues with elongated heads on a grassy slope	Isla de Pascua, Chile; 27°07′00″S 109°22′00″W	Cultural: (i), (iii), (v)	7,130 (17,600)	1995	Covering almost half of Easter Island, this park showcases the unique cultural landscape produced by the isolated Rapanui civilisation. Its most recognisable features are the distinctive moai statues and ceremonial shrines (ahu). It was inscribed on the list as a "remarkable cultural phenomenon".
Rock Islands Southern Lagoon	Aerial view of Jellyfish Lake	Koror, Palau; 7°14′49″N 134°21′09″E	Mixed: (iii), (v), (vii), (ix), (x)	100,200 (248,000)	2012	Rock Islands Southern Lagoon covers 100,200-hectare and numbers 445 uninhabited limestone islands of volcanic origin. Many of them display unique mushroom-like shapes in turquoise lagoons surrounded by coral reefs. The site features over 385 coral species and different types of habitat. The site harbours the highest concentration of marine lakes anywhere, isolated bodies of seawater separated from the ocean by land barriers.
Royal Exhibition Building and Carlton Gardens	Large cream-coloured building with central dome and grand arched entrance, fronted by flowered gardens and a tiered fountain	Victoria, Australia; 37°48′22″S 144°58′13″E	Cultural: (ii)	26 (64)	2004	Made to host the world's fair in 1880, this is one of the world's last exhibition buildings from the 19th century, and combines several architectural styles. The adjacent gardens are an outstanding example of Victorian era landscape design.
Shark Bay, Western Australia	Scattered small black mounds growing in an area of shallows by the sea	Western Australia, Australia; 25°29′10″S 113°26′10″E	Natural: (vii), (viii), (ix), (x)	2,197,300 (5,430,000)	1991	With the largest and richest area of seagrass meadows in the world, this site is a critical habitat for endangered dugongs, hosting about 12% of the world's population. Hamelin Pool contains the world's most diverse and abundant colony of living stromatolites, providing some of the earliest records of life on earth.
Sydney Opera House	Beige and white building with seven peaked rooves, sitting on a promontory surrounded by water	New South Wales, Australia; 33°51′24″S 151°12′55″E	Cultural: (i)	5.80 (14.3)	2007	Opened in 1973, this performing arts complex is an iconic landmark of Sydney Harbour renowned for its innovative architecture. The design is an example of the expressionist style and has had a lasting influence on architecture.
Taputapuatea marae	Weathered grey stone bust with a palm frond crown. Grey rocks with white and in between them in the background.	Raiatea, French Polynesia; 16°50′29.04″S 151°22′20.56″W	Cultural: (iii)(iv)(vi)	2,124 (5,250)	2017	The property includes two forested valleys, a portion of lagoon and coral reef and a strip of open ocean. At the heart of the property is the Taputapuātea marae complex, a political, ceremonial and funerary centre. Taputapuātea is an exceptional testimony to 1,000 years of mā'ohi civilization.
Tasmanian Wilderness	Scruffy, rocky ridge overlooking a hill covered in golden-coloured grass and shrubbery	Tasmania, Australia; 41°35′00″S 145°25′00″E	Mixed: (iii), (iv), (vi), (vii), (viii), (ix), (x)	1,407,513 (3,478,040)	1982	Covering almost 20% of Tasmania, this area constitutes one of the world's last stretches of temperate wilderness. It is dominated by the remote and inaccessible South West Wilderness area. Excavations in the area have uncovered evidence of aboriginal presence dating from at least 20,000 years ago.
Te Wahipounamu – South West New Zealand	Rocky mountain covered in forest, with part of a tree in the foreground infringing the view	South Island, New Zealand; 45°02′10″S 167°19′11″E	Natural: (vii), (viii), (ix), (x)	2,600,000 (6,400,000)	1990 (Note: When it was inscribed in 1990, Te Wahipounamu incorporated and superseded two previously inscribed World Heritage Sites: Westland and Mount Cook National Park and Fiordland National Park. Both of the prior sites were inscribed in 1986.)	A mountainous landscape of ridges and fjords shaped by thousands of years of glacial excavation. The area incorporates several national parks and is the most pristine wilderness in New Zealand. It hosts the best surviving illustration of ancient Gondwanan wildlife, much of which is rare and unique to the area.
Tongariro National Park	Frozen lake in the cradle of a snow-capped mountain with jagged rocky peaks	Ruapehu, New Zealand; 39°17′27″S 175°33′44″E	Mixed: (vi), (vii), (viii)	79,596 (196,690)	1990	Inscribed for its outstanding geological and cultural significance. It contains a diverse range of volcanic features. Many of its summits are sacred to Māori, as their traditional belief system associates the mountains with their ancient ancestors.
Uluṟu-Kata Tjuṯa National Park	View of a large red sandstone monolith against a sunset sky and flanked by two silhouetted trees	Northern Territory, Australia; 25°20′S 131°00′E	Mixed: (v), (vi), (vii), (viii)	132,566 (327,580)	1987	Inscribed for its archaeological and cultural significance, being representative of Aboriginal spiritual connection to the land. The park's two massive sandstone formations, Uluṟu and Kata Tjuṯa, are spiritually significant to the Anangu people, and form part of the tjukurpa belief system. Cave paintings found at Uluru date back tens of thousands of years.
Wet Tropics of Queensland	Dense rainforest scene, with a small pool surrounded by ferns and moss-laden rocks	Queensland, Australia; 15°39′S 144°58′E	Natural: (vii), (viii), (ix), (x)	894,420 (2,210,200)	1988	An area of tropical rainforest spread along the Great Dividing Range. The area hosts an exceptional level of biodiversity, with at least 85 endemic species and the highest concentration of primitive taxa in the world. It is also an important area for unique and endangered marsupials.
Willandra Lakes Region	Sandy ground fronting a strip of blue water on the horizon, with a piece of dead wood in foreground	New South Wales, Australia; 34°S 143°E	Mixed: (iii), (viii)	240,000 (590,000)	1981	A geological site containing fossilised remains of sand formations. It includes exceptional archaeological evidence of past human habitation from 45–60,000 years ago, including the world's oldest cremation site, the Lake Mungo remains.

== Tentative List ==
The Tentative List is an inventory of important heritage and natural sites that a country is considering for inscription on the World Heritage List. The Tentative List can be updated at any time, but inclusion on the list is a prerequisite to being considered for inscription.

Site	Image	Location	Criteria	Area ha (acre)	Year of submission	Description
Marine Protected Areas of American Samoa		American Samoa 14°21′54″S 170°45′54″W	Natural (vii)(ix)(x)		2017	
Great Sandy World Heritage Area		Queensland, Australia; 25°39′00″S 153°00′00″E	Natural: (vii)(viii)(ix)	184,000 (450,000)	2010	An extension to Fraser Island's area, this extension will include several component parts including the Cooloola section of the Great Sandy National Park, Breaksea Spit, Platypus Bay, the Great Sandy Strait/Tin Can Bay Ramsar area and the Wide Bay Military Reserve. This expand will contribute to Fraser Island's value, sharing much of the same features also found. These additional sites will help to provide a bigger story to the formation of the world's oldest coastal dune formation.
The Gondwana Rainforests of Australia World Heritage Area (extension to existing property)		New South Wales/Queensland, Australia; 30°04′15″S 152°18′08″E	Natural: (viii)(ix)(x)	268,678 (663,920)	2010	Another extension to existing area.
Flinders Ranges		South Australia, Australia 20°33′06″S 116°50′09″E	Natural (viii)		2021	
Yapese Disk Money Regional Sites		Yap State, Federated States of Micronesia 9°32′00″N 138°07′00″E	Cultural (i)(ii)(iii)(iv)		2004	
Sovi Basin		Eastern Division, Fiji 17°59′01″S 178°10′56″E	Cultural (iii)(iv)(v)		1999	
Sigatoka Sand Dunes		Western Division, Fiji 20°33′06″S 116°50′09″E	Cultural (iii)(iv)(v)		1999	
Yaduataba Crested Iguana Sanctuary		Northern Division, Fiji 16°50′00″S 178°16′45″E	Natural (x)		1999	
Northern Marshall Islands Atolls		Ralik Chain, Marshall Islands 8°N 167°E	Mixed		2005	
Likiep Village Historic District		Ratak Chain, Marshall Islands 9°54′00″N 169°08′00″E	Cultural (ii)(iv)		2005	
Mili Atoll Nature Conservancy (and Nadrikdrik)		Ratak Chain, Marshall Islands 6°08′00″N 171°55′00″E	Natural		2005	
Auckland volcanic fields		North Island, New Zealand 36°52′37″S 174°45′50″E	Mixed (ii)(iii)(iv)(v)(viii)		2007	
Kahurangi National Park, Farewell Spit and Canaan karst system		South Island, New Zealand 41°15′00″S 172°07′00″E	Natural (vii)(viii)(ix)(x)		2007	
Kerikeri Basin historic precinct		North Island, New Zealand 35°13′00″S 173°58′00″E	Cultural (ii)(iii)(iv)(v)(vi)		2007	
Kermadec Islands and Marine reserve		North Island, New Zealand 29°16′37″S 177°55′24″W	Natural (vii)(viii)(ix)(x)		2007	
Napier Art Deco historic precinct		North Island, New Zealand 39°29′25″S 176°55′04″E	Cultural (ii)(iv)(vi)		2007	
Waitangi Treaty Grounds historic precinct		North Island, New Zealand 35°15′58″S 174°04′48″E	Cultural (i)(ii)(iii)(iv)(vi)		2007	
Waters and seabed of Fiordland (Te Moana O Atawhenua)		South Island, New Zealand 44°44′S 167°34′E	Natural (vii)(viii)(ix)(x)		2007	
Whakarua Moutere (North East Islands)		North Island, New Zealand 34°09′14″S 172°08′24″E	Natural (vii)(viii)(ix)(x)		2007	
Marianas Trench Marine National Monument		Northern Mariana Islands 18°N 148°E	Natural (viii)(ix)(x)		2017	
Imeong Conservation Area		Babeldaob, Palau 7°31′39″N 134°31′32″E	Mixed		2004	
Ouballang ra Ngebedech (Ngebedech Terraces)		Babeldaob, Palau 7°26′13″N 134°29′34″E	Cultural (ii)(iii)(v)		2004	
Tet el Bad Stone Coffin		Ngarchelong, Palau 7°43′10″N 134°36′48″E	Cultural (i)		2004	
Yapease Quarry Sites		Airai, Palau 7°21′01″N 134°33′54″E	Cultural (i)(ii)(iii)		2004	
Huon Terraces - Stairway to the Past		Morone, Papua New Guinea 6°24′S 147°30′E	Mixed (iii)(v)(vii)(viii)(ix)(x)		2006	
Kikori River Basin / Great Papuan Plateau		Gulf, Southern Highlands, Western Highlands, Papua New Guinea 7°39′00″S 144°17′00″E	Mixed (iii)(iv)(v)(vii)(viii)(ix)(x)		2006	
Kokoda Track and Owen Stanley Ranges		Central, Southern Highlands, Papua New Guinea 9°23′S 148°24′E	Mixed (iii)(v)(vi)(vii)(x)		2006	
Milne Bay Seascape (Pacific Jewels of Marine Biodiversity)		Milne Bay, Papua New Guinea 10°22′00″S 150°30′00″E	Mixed (iii)(v)(vii)(viii)(ix)(x)		2006	
The Sublime Karsts of Papua New Guinea		East New Britain, Southern Highlands, Western, Papua New Guinea 6°36′13″S 142°35′16″E	Mixed (v)(vii)(viii)(ix)(x)		2006	
Trans-Fly Complex		Western, Papua New Guinea 8°54′S 141°00′E	Mixed (v)(vi)(x)		2006	
Upper Sepik River Basin		East Sepik, West Sepik, Papua New Guinea 5°13′00″S 141°49′00″E	Mixed (i)(iii)(iv)(v)(vii)(viii)(ix)(x)		2006	
Fagaloa Bay – Uafato Tiavea Conservation Zone		Va'a-o-Fonoti, Samoa 13°55′37″S 171°32′26″W	Mixed (v)(vii)(x)		2006	
Manono, Apolima and Nuulopa Cultural Landscape		Aiga-i-le-Tai, Samoa 13°45′00″S 172°05′00″W	Cultural (iii)(v)		2006	
Marovo - Tetepare Complex		Western, Solomon Islands 8°29′S 158°04′E	Mixed (iii)(v)(vi)(vii)(viii)(ix)(x)		2008	
Tropical Rainforest Heritage of Solomon Islands		Choiseul, Guadalcanal, Makira-Ulawa, Western, Solomon Islands 7°08′00″S 156°57′00″E	Natural (vii)(ix)(x)		2008	
Lapita Pottery Archaeological Sites		Haʻapai, Niuatoputapu, Tongatapu, Vavaʻu, Tonga 20°S 175°W	Cultural (iii)(iv)		2007	
The Ancient Capitals of the Kingdom of Tonga		Tongatapu, Tonga 21°12′41″S 175°09′11″W	Cultural (iii)(iv)		2007	
Pacific Islands Heritage Marine National Monument		Baker Island, Howland Island, Jarvis Island, Johnston Atoll, Kingman Reef, Palmyra Atoll, Wake Island,United States Minor Outlying Islands 5°53′00″N 162°05′00″W	Natural (vii)(viii)(x)		2017	
Lake Letas		Torba, Vanuatu 14°17′00″S 167°32′00″E	Natural (vii)(ix)(x)		2004	
The Nowon and Votwos of Ureparapara		Torba, Vanuatu 13°32′00″S 167°20′00″E	Cultural (iii)(iv)(v)		2005	
The President Coolidge		Sanma, Vanuatu 15°25′00″S 166°54′00″E	Cultural (i)(iii)(iv)(v)		2004	
Vatthe Conservation Area		Sanma, Vanuatu 15°25′00″S 166°54′00″E	Natural (vii)(ix)(x)		2004	
Yalo, Apialo and the sacred geography of Northwest Malakula		Malampa, Vanuatu 16°15′S 167°30′E	Cultural (iii)		2004	
