= Brickendon and Woolmers Estates =

Brickendon and Woolmers Estates is an Australian National Heritage and World Heritage area, as part of the Australian Convict Sites World Heritage Area. It consists of adjacent farming properties:

- Woolmers Estate
- Brickendon Estate
