= Archer family =

Family in Tasmania, Australia

Archer
- Coat of Arms of the Archer family
- Origin: Hertfordshire, England
- Connected families: Kermode, Mifflin, Weston
- Distinctions: Prominence in business, politics and farming
- Estates: Brickendon, Landfall

The Archer family are a notable family in Tasmania, Australia, prominent in society, business and politics of Tasmania for the last two centuries. They are best known today for their now world-heritage listed farm estates, Brickendon Estate and Woolmers Estate, but have contributed to many areas of Tasmania throughout their history. Other members of the family have been Mayors of Hertford in England and participated in the American Civil War.

== Politics ==
Among the family, there have been 9 members of the Tasmanian Parliament and numerous members of Municipal Councils.

Name	House of Parliament	Years sitting	Born-Died
Thomas Archer I	Legislative Council	1827–1844	1790–1850
Joseph Archer	Legislative Council	1851–1853	1795–1853
William Archer	Legislative Council/House of Assembly	1851–1855(MLC)/1860-1862 & 1866–1868 (MHA)	1820–1874
Joseph Archer	Legislative Council	1861-March 1863, April 1863-1872	1823-1914
Robert Archer	House of Assembly	1869–1871	1832–1914
Basil Archer	House of Assembly	1871–1872	1841–1923
William Henry Davies Archer	House of Assembly	1882–1886	1836–1928
Frank Archer	House of Assembly	1893–1902	1836–1902
Compton Abbot Archer	Legislative Council	1944-1950	1885-1961

Name	Position	Years Alderman	Born-Died
William Henry Davies Archer	Longford: Alderman, Council Warden, Treasurer	1872–1894	1836–1928
William Fulbert Archer	Longford: Alderman, Council Warden	–	1883–1952
Robert Joseph Archer	Longford: Alderman, Council Warden	–	1832–1914
Ludlow Archer	Longford: Alderman	–	1857–1916
Thomas Cathcart Archer	Longford: Alderman, Council Warden	–	1862–1934
Gerald Edward Archer	Lilydale: Alderman	1909-1949	1877-1949

== Ancestors ==
The earliest known ancestor of this family with the Archer surname was Doctor Thomas Archer (unknown-1694). He was an Alderman of Hertford, and served as Mayor of Hertford in 1681 and 1694. His brothers were John, Henry and Joseph Archer. He had three children; John, William and Joseph. His cousin, Captain William Minors (unknown-1668) was Mayor of Hertford in 1662.

His son, John Archer (unknown-unknown) had one son, Thomas.

Thomas Archer (unknown-1734) married Sarah Newton, daughter of Edmond Newton of Bengeo. His daughter Sarah died at birth, and he left one son, John Archer. He left considerable property upon death.

John Archer (1723-1765) in 1752 married Mary Bazeil (or Bassill) and had two sons and one daughter; William Archer (1754-1833), Henry Waldegrave Archer (1756-1788) and Mary Archer (1759-1805)

== First generation ==
=== William Archer (1754–1833) ===
William Archer was the eldest son of John Archer and therefore ancestor of all Tasmanian members of the Archer family. He was great great grandson of Thomas Archer (unknown-1667). He married Martha Kensey and was a miller by trade. He stayed in England until 1827 when he joined his sons in Tasmania. He died from a fall from a horse in 1833.

=== Henry Waldegrave Archer (1756–1788) ===
Henry Archer was the second son of John Archer and younger brother of William Archer (1754-1833). He travelled to America, where he became a Major and volunteer adjutant to Anthony Wayne. He was granted the Brevet of Captain by an act of the US Congress on 26 July 1779 for bringing General Washington's missives safety to Congress. Henry Archer went on to marry Rebecca Mifflin, cousin of Thomas Mifflin 1st Governor of Pennsylvania. It was recorded in 1784 that he was appointed Lieutenant of Northampton, Massachusetts. He died in 1788 and was buried at the "Friends burial ground on the Corner of Arch and Fourth Streets", possibly Arch Street Friends Meeting House.

== Second generation ==
=== William Archer (1788–1879) ===
William was the eldest son of William Archer of Hertfordshire. He arrived in Tasmania in 1821 on the ship Aguilar, where he settled at Brickendon – the second of the families two most famous homesteads – and began his farm with 30 merino sheep he had brought with him from England. He became a highly successful farmer and cooperated highly with his brother at neighbouring Woolmers. He was repeatedly asked to become a member of the Legislative Council but declined; he did however accept a position of Magistrate in 1835. During his life he became a noted anti-transportationist. He died on 24 March 1879. He was reported as leaving either three or four sons and one or two daughters, with his second son inheriting Brickendon and his first Saundridge. His fourth son, G F Archer, became the Reverend of Torquay (modern Devonport).

=== Thomas Archer I (1790–1850) ===
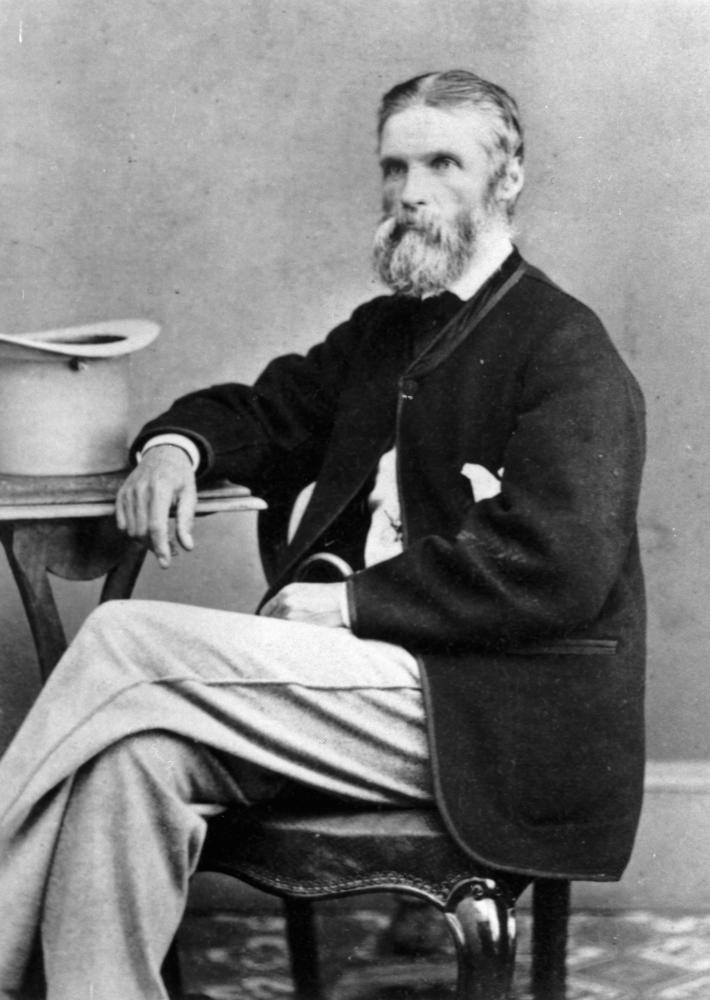
Thomas Archer I

Thomas Archer I was born on 3 April 1790, in Hertfordshire, England, the fourth but second surviving son of William Archer. His father was a successful miller. The Archer family's influence on Tasmania started when Thomas Archer I immigrated from Hertfordshire, England to the Australian colonies. Thomas I originally arrived in Sydney in 1812 as a clerk, before quickly being transferred to then Van Diemens Land, where he quickly rose through the ranks under Governor Macquarie.

He was appointed head clerk of Port Dalrymple (Now George Town) in 1813, becoming magistrate in 1814, coroner in 1816 of all of Cornwall County, which at the time encompassed nearly half of Tasmania, and magistrate for the same 18 months later. In 1817 he was appointed deputy assistant commissary of Cornwall, and in December of that year he was appointed commissary of Hobart. In 1819 he was returned to Port Dalrymple as head commissary of the town. However, by 1821 he had retired following quarrels with officers of the commandant. However, in the meantime he had acquired 2,000 acres at what is now Woolmers, and he returned there to run his farm. By 1825 he had reached 6,000 acres.

He was progressively joined by his brothers, who immigrated from England to build the Panshanger, Brickendon, Northbury, Fairfield, Cheshunt, Woodside, Palmerston and Saundridge estates between them. In 1826 he was appointed part of the first Legislative Council of Tasmania, which he remained a member of until he resigned due to ill health in 1845. In 1842, he joined the bank founded by his brothers two years earlier, Archer, Gilles and Co, however the banks failure in 1844 lost significant money for Thomas and the bank was absorbed by the Union Bank of Australia, which would go on to become ANZ Thomas died of dropsy in 1850.

=== Edward Archer (1793–1862) ===
Edward Archer was the third surviving son of William Archer of Hertfordshire. He settled in Tasmania at Northbury, which he built the final house of in 1862. He died in 1862, leaving eight sons and two daughters. His wife, Sussanah Archer, survived until 1890 and was herself a notable member of the local community, being a contributor to the Longford Wesleyan Church, of which she laid the foundation stone. His sons went on to inherit or buy various properties, including Longford Hall, Landfall and Huntsworth. His eldest son, Basil, went on to become a member of the Tasmanian parliament and his 8th son, Ludlow, inherited Northbury and went on to become a Councilor of Longford Municipality and Justice of the Peace.

=== Joseph Archer (1795–1853) ===
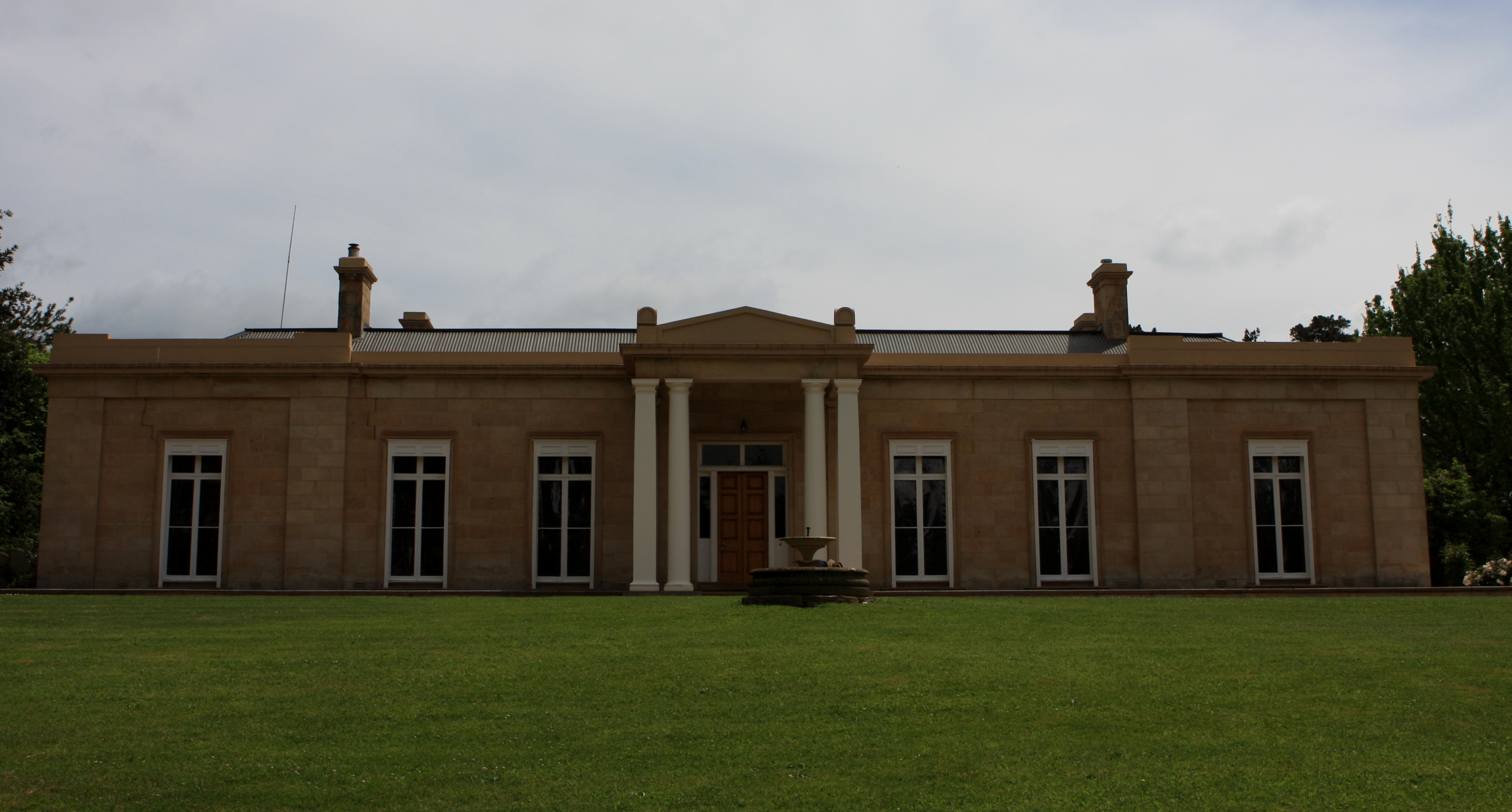
Panshanger House in Longford, Tasmania, built by Joseph Archer.

Joseph Archer was the younger brother of Thomas I. He immigrated to Van Diemens Land following his brothers success, where he built the Greek-revival Panshanger Estate in Longford. He was highly successful until the bankruptcy of the family bank, Archer, Gilles and Co which in 1844 left him with debts of 70,000 pound, which he paid off before his death. He became a member of the Tasmanian Legislative Council in 1847, and held the post till his sudden death in 1853. He died without heir and his estate was inherited by his nephew, also Joseph Archer. The property remained in his hands until 1908, when it was sold to the Mills family. It is presently a B&B and 6,000 acre farm.

== Third Generation ==
=== William Archer (1820–1874) ===
William Archer was the second son of Thomas Archer I. As he was not in line to inherit the estate, he pursued his own career and built Cheshunt House. He became a noted parliamentarian, architect and botanist. His many architectural projects include many of his family's properties, most notably Woolmers itself but also Saundridge at Cressy and the non-archer Mona Vale. He in 1856 was appointed a Magistrate of Tasmania, and the same year elected Member for Westbury in the Tasmanian House of Assembly. Due to ill health he resigned his post in 1862.

=== Joseph Archer (1823–1914) ===
The second Joseph Archer was the son of Thomas Archer I. He married the daughter of the two time Premier of Tasmania, William Weston. He was granted Fairfield Estate by his father and later he inherited Panshanger and Burlington estates from his uncle, also Joseph. In 1862 he was elected a member of the Tasmanian Legislative Council for Longford, which he represented for ten years. He sold his property Panshanger in 1908 to the Mills family, after a period of ill health, and he sold Burlington shortly after. Fairfield had been sold some time before that. He died in 1914, leaving three sons and three daughters.

=== Robert Joseph Archer (1832–1914) ===
Robert Archer (born 1832) was the eldest son of William Archer (1788–1879), inheriting his estate of Saundridge. He became a well known local farmer, and member of Longford Municipal Council. He was briefly a member of the House of Assembly, representing Ringwood (modern Cressy). He was a state magistrate for some years. He sold his property to the Thirkell family (of Angela Thirkell fame) around 1875 and moved to Melbourne, where he died in 1914. His son Alexander became a successful lawyer, in partnership originally with John Clemons.

=== William Henry Davies Archer (1836–1928) ===
The second son of William Archer (1788–1879), William inherited Brickendon Estate from his father. He was educated in Tasmania and England, graduating from Trinity College, Cambridge in 1859 with a Bachelor of Arts and 1860 with a Bachelor of Laws, receiving a Master of Laws in 1863. In 1862 he had finished courses at the Middle Temple and was able to serve at the bar. He was elected a Fellow of the Royal Geographical Society, London in 1860. He married Aphra Gertrude Clerke, daughter of Alexander Clerke, a member of parliament for Tasmania.

In 1869 he was appointed a magistrate of Tasmania, and in 1883 a state coroner. From 1882 to 1887 he was a member of the House of Assembly for Norfolk Plains, during which time he was offered the posts of Speaker, Treasurer and Chief Secretary in succession and declined each. He became a member of the Royal Commissions into Education and Prisons, and was Tasmania's representative to the 1878 Paris World Fair. In 1872 he was elected a member of Longford Municipal Council, on which he served for 22 years, becoming for the last 17 years Warden. He became Treasurer of the Municipality during his time, and served on the Longford Show Society Committee, as well as being chairman of the Boards of Health, Rabbits, Fruits and Advice.

He died in 1828. He left two daughters, and a son, who inherited Brickendon.

=== Basil Archer (1841–1923) ===
Basil Archer was the eldest son of Edward Archer (1793–1879). He settled at the estate of Woodside in partnership with his brother Daniel, but brought out his brothers share, going on to additionally purchase the properties of Iveridge, Melrose and Inglewood during his lifetime. He was a Methodist lay leader for his local church for 52 years, as well as serving as a member of Longford Municipal Council for 25 years and was briefly a member of the House of Assembly 1871–1872 for Ringwood (modern Cressy). He died of heart failure suddenly while visiting Adelaide.

=== Frank Archer ===
Fifth son of Edward Archer (1793–1879). Born 1846. Married Margery Johnson. He was educated at Horton College. He was member of the Dorset Road Trust, and Justice of the Peace. He purchased the estates of Burnside, Landfall and Lauriston. He represented the electorate of Selby from 1983-1902 in the House of Assembly. He died in office in 1902. He had six sons - including Gerald Edward, Charles and Evelyn.

== Fourth Generation ==
=== Thomas Archer III (1840–1890) ===
The only son of Thomas Archer II, Thomas Archer III was born in 1840 – 4 years before his father died of scarlet fever. He was a state magistrate for 24 years. He died in 1890 at the Blenheim Hotel, Longford, leaving a wife, three sons and three daughters. The eldest, Thomas Archer IV, inherited Woolmers. His wife, Louisa Kate, died in 1908 in St Kilda, Victoria.

=== William Fulbert Archer (1883–1952) ===
William Fulbert Archer was the only son of William Henry Davies Archer of Brickendon. He studied at Cambridge, graduating with Bachelor of Arts, and returning home where he inherited the estate from his father upon his death. He married Phyllis Bisdee and ran the farm during his life. He became a member of Longford Municipal Council for many years and Council Warden, and was patron of the Northern Agricultural Society. He was a coroner for the district as well. He was survived by two sons, Peter and Kerry, and a daughter Rose.

=== Gerald Edward Archer (1877-1949) ===
Son of Frank Archer (1846–1902). He was a founding member of Lilydale Council, and sat on it for 41 years. He had one son, Frank Rob Archer, and a daughter, Dr Geraldine Archer.

== Fifth Generation ==
=== Thomas Archer IV (1862–1934) ===
Thomas Cathcart Archer was born in 1862, son of Thomas Archer III. He was educated at Launceston Church Grammar School and he inherited Woolmers upon his father's death and was during his life promoted community and sports movements. He played cricket in North vs South state matches and was President of the Longford Golf Club and patron of the Tamar Yacht Club at the time of his death and previously commodore of it. He was also a member of Longford Show Council and a member of Longford Municipal Council for 32 years as well as a Justice of the Peace. He married Eleanor Mary Harrap and had one son, Thomas Edward Cathcart Archer. He died on 11 August 1934 while in Melbourne.

== Legacy ==
A book on the family, titled The Archers of Van Diemens Land : a history of pioneer pastoral families was published in 1991, written by Neil Chick. Two of their homes, Woolmers and Brickendon, are world heritage listed as part of the Australian Convict Sites area.

Many of the properties built by the family – Northbury (Longford), Saundridge (Cressy), Panshanger (Longford), Cheshunt (Meander Valley), Fairfield (Cressy), Palmerston (Cressy) and Woodside (Cressy) are all listed on the Tasmanian Heritage Register. Cheshunt House, designed and owned by William Archer (1820–1874), was featured on a stamp issued by Australia Post in 2004.

One line of the family still owns and farms Brickendon Estate, while another line owns an award-winning dairy based out of the family estate Landfall.

Sitting member of the Tasmanian House of Assembly and former federal MP Bridget Archer married Winston Archer of Effingham.

== See also ==
- Political families of Australia
