= William Archer (architect) =

Australian architect and explorer

William Archer (1820–1874) was an Australian architect, naturalist, grazier, politician and member of the prominent Archer family. He was the second son of Thomas Archer, a prominent pastoralist and politician himself. A keen interest in architecture led to him going to London to study architecture when he finished school, where he studied under William Rogers and Robert Stephenson. During his life he built many colonial buildings across Tasmania, served as a member of both the Tasmanian House of Assembly and Tasmanian Legislative Council and made significant contributions to botany, with several native Tasmanian plants named after him. Despite this, he died penniless at Fairfield Estate, which belonged to his brother Joseph Archer, on 15 October 1874.

== Life ==
Archer was born in Launceston, Van Diemen's Land (now Tasmania) into the influential local Archer family, owners of the Brickendon Estate and Woolmers Estate, a closely knit and pious Anglican family to Thomas (1780–1850), a banker and landholder, and Susannah (née Hortle) Archer. He was married (7 April 1846) to Anne Hortle, his first cousin, with whom he had thirteen children, one of whom died before him.

Archer studied architecture and surveying in London from 1836 to 1840 under William Rogers. Following completion of those studies he worked under Robert Stephenson for two years, before returning to Tasmania on 18 October 1842. His career in architecture was delayed however when his brother died and the family bank collapsed. He took over management of the family estate Woolmers for some years. Following this, he moved to London again to study botany. Archer studied botany in England between the years 1856 and 1858 and was elected a Fellow of the Linnean Society before returning to Tasmania. He was secretary of the Royal Society of Tasmania from 1860 to 1861. Sir Joseph Dalton Hooker wrote a dedication to him (and jointly to Ronald Campbell Gunn) in his Flora Tasmaniae (1859). Archer composed illustrations of orchids and collected and sent numerous Tasmanian plant specimens to the Royal Botanical Gardens in Kew.

He was the appointed architect to the Anglican Diocese of Tasmania, and designed The Hutchins School located in Hobart (1848–49), additions to the world heritage listed Woolmers and Brickendon estates, the calendar house "Mona Vale" (1865–68) in Ross, his own home Cheshunt, Fairfield for his brother. his cousins house Saundridge and Horton College at Ross. Archer did some of his architectural work free of charge.

Archer died in Cressy, on 15 October 1874 following a prolonged period of financial hardship.

=== Politics ===
He was a member of the Tasmanian parliament three times, once as a member of the Legislative Council (1851–1855) and twice as a member of the House of Assembly (1860–1862 and 1866–1868).

== Architectural works ==
=== Residences ===
- Part of Woolmers Estate
- Saundridge, Cressy
- Portico of Brickendon Estate
- Cheshunt House, Meander Valley
- Mona Vale, Ross
- Nursery wing of Panshanger House, Longford
- Additions to Fairfield House, Epping Forest

=== Churches ===
- St Peter's Church of England, St Leonards (demolished)
- Former Paterson's Plains Chapel, St Leonards

=== Schools ===
- Horton College (mostly demolished)
- Old The Hutchins School Building

== Legacy ==
The species Eucalyptus archeri, Amphibromus archeri, Corunastylis archeri (the elfin midge orchid) and the genus Archeria are named after him.
