= Mona Vale =

Mona Vale may refer to:

- Mona Vale, New South Wales, a suburb in northern Sydney
  - Mona Vale Hospital, a district hospital located in Mona Vale
  - Mona Vale Road, part of Metroad 3 in Sydney
- Mona Vale, Christchurch, a public park in Christchurch, New Zealand
- Mona Vale, Tasmania, a country estate in Tasmania.
