= Coal Mines Historic Site =

UNESCO heritage site in Tasmania, Australia

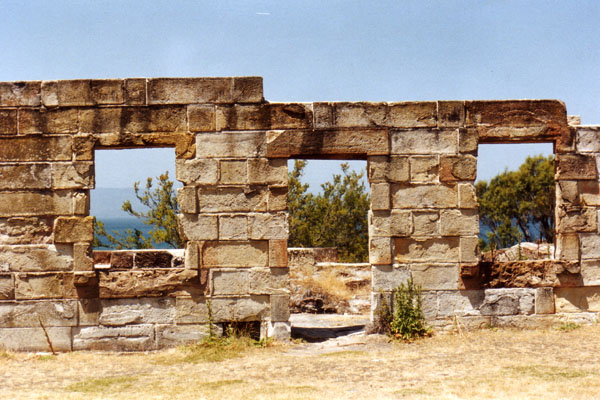
- View of ruins in the Coal Mines area
- Interactive map of Coal Mines Historic Site
- Type: Historic Site
- Location: Saltwater Creek Rd, Little Norfolk Bay, Tasman Peninsula
- Coordinates: 42°59′1″S 147°42′59″E
- Area: 352.47 hectares (871.0 acres)
- Operator: Port Arthur Historic Site Management Authority
- Status: Australian National Heritage List; World Heritage list
- Website: https://coalmines.org.au

UNESCO World Heritage Site
- Type: Cultural
- Criteria: iv, vi
- Designated: 2010 (34th session)
- Part of: Australian Convict Sites
- Reference no.: 1306
- Region: Asia-Pacific

Coal Mines Historic Site was a convict probation station and the site of Tasmania's (then Van Diemen's Land's) first operational coal mine, serving for a period of 15 years (1833–1848) "as a place of punishment for the 'worst class' of convicts from Port Arthur".

It is now the site of a collection of ruins and landscape modifications located amongst bushland facing onto the Tasman Peninsula's Little Norfolk Bay, being ruins and landscape modifications of such cultural significance to Australia and to the World that the site has been formally inscribed onto both the Australian National Heritage List and UNESCO's World Heritage list as amongst:

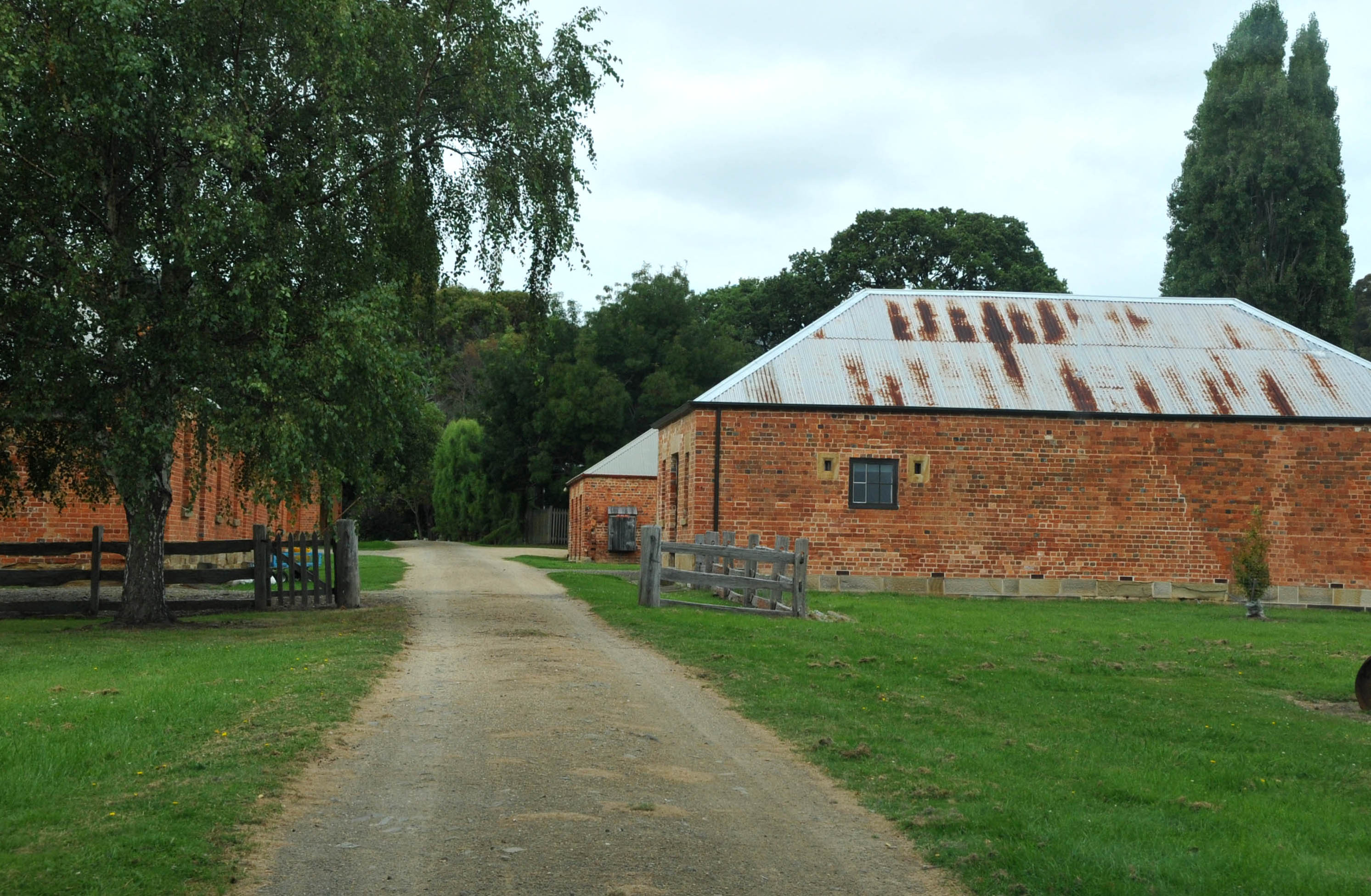
Norfolk Bay Convict Station

... the best surviving examples of large-scale convict transportation and the colonial expansion of European powers through the presence and labour of convicts.

== See also ==
- Australian Convict Sites
