= Darlington Probation Station =

Heritage site in Darlington, Tasmania

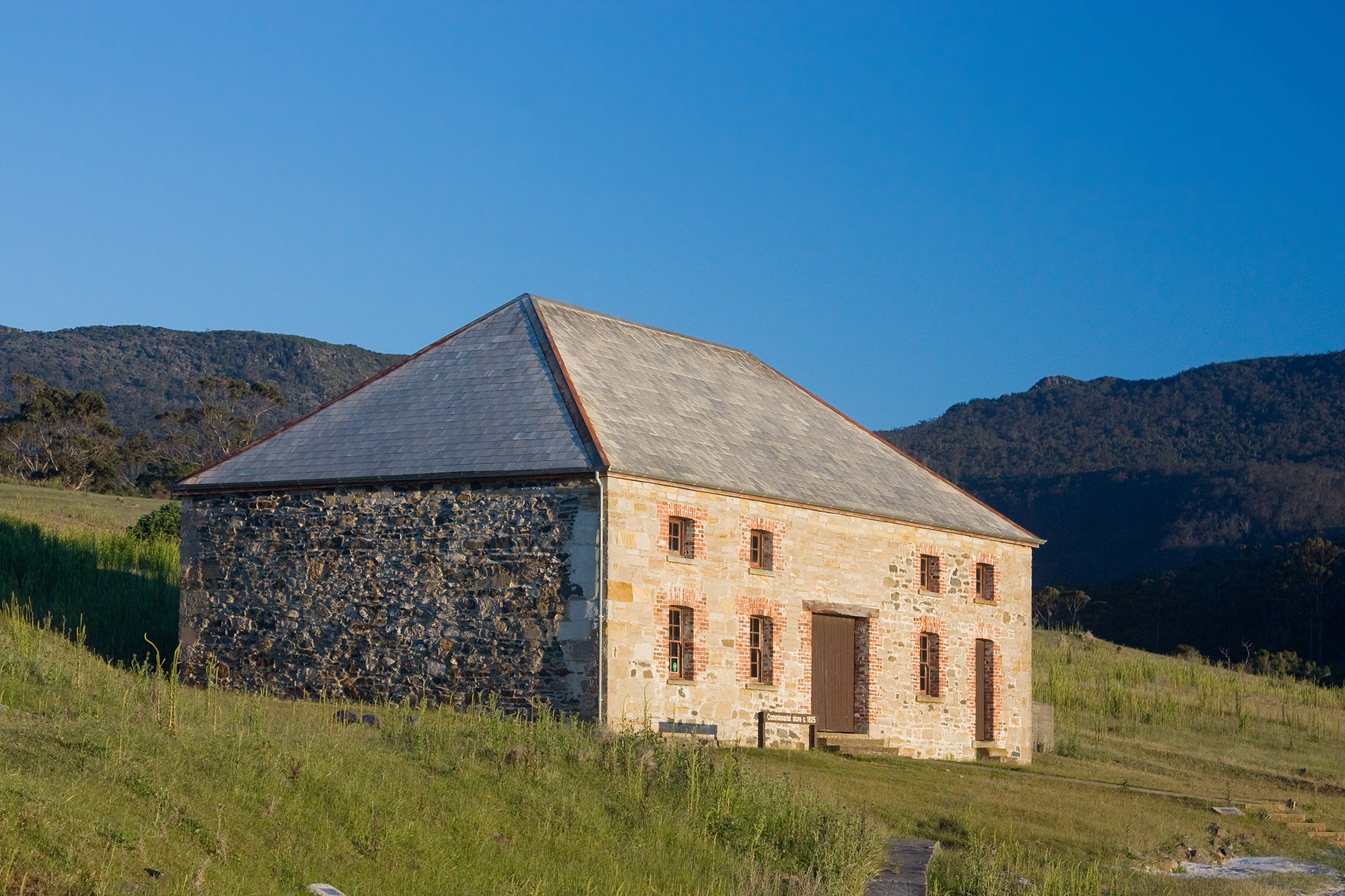
- View of one of the buildings (the Commissariat Store) within the Darlington Probation Station precinct.
- Interactive map of Darlington Probation Station
- Type: National Park
- Location: Maria Island
- Coordinates: 42°34′57″S 148°04′12″E
- Area: 2,329.28 hectares (5,755.8 acres)
- Status: Australian National Heritage List; World Heritage list
- Website: http://www.parks.tas.gov.au/index.aspx?base=2707

UNESCO World Heritage Site
- Type: Cultural
- Criteria: iv, vi
- Designated: 2010 (34th session)
- Part of: Australian Convict Sites
- Reference no.: 1306
- Region: Asia-Pacific

Darlington Probation Station was a convict penal settlement on Maria Island, Tasmania (then Van Diemen's Land), Australia, from 1825 to 1832, and later a convict probation station from 1842 to 1850, during the last phase of convict management in eastern Australia.

A number of convict-era buildings and structures have survived relatively intact and in good condition, and of the 78 convict probation stations built in Tasmania, the remains on Maria Island are regarded as "the most outstanding representative example". Due to its cultural significance, the site been inscribed onto the Australian National Heritage List and UNESCO's World Heritage list as being amongst:

... the best surviving examples of large-scale convict transportation and the colonial expansion of European powers through the presence and labour of convicts.

== See also ==
- Australian Convict Sites
- Maria Island National Park: First Convict Era (1825–1832)
- Maria Island National Park: Second Convict Era (1842–1850)
