= Government House, Norfolk Island =

UNESCO World Heritage site on Norfolk Island, Australia

Coordinates: 29.0573°S 167.9616°E

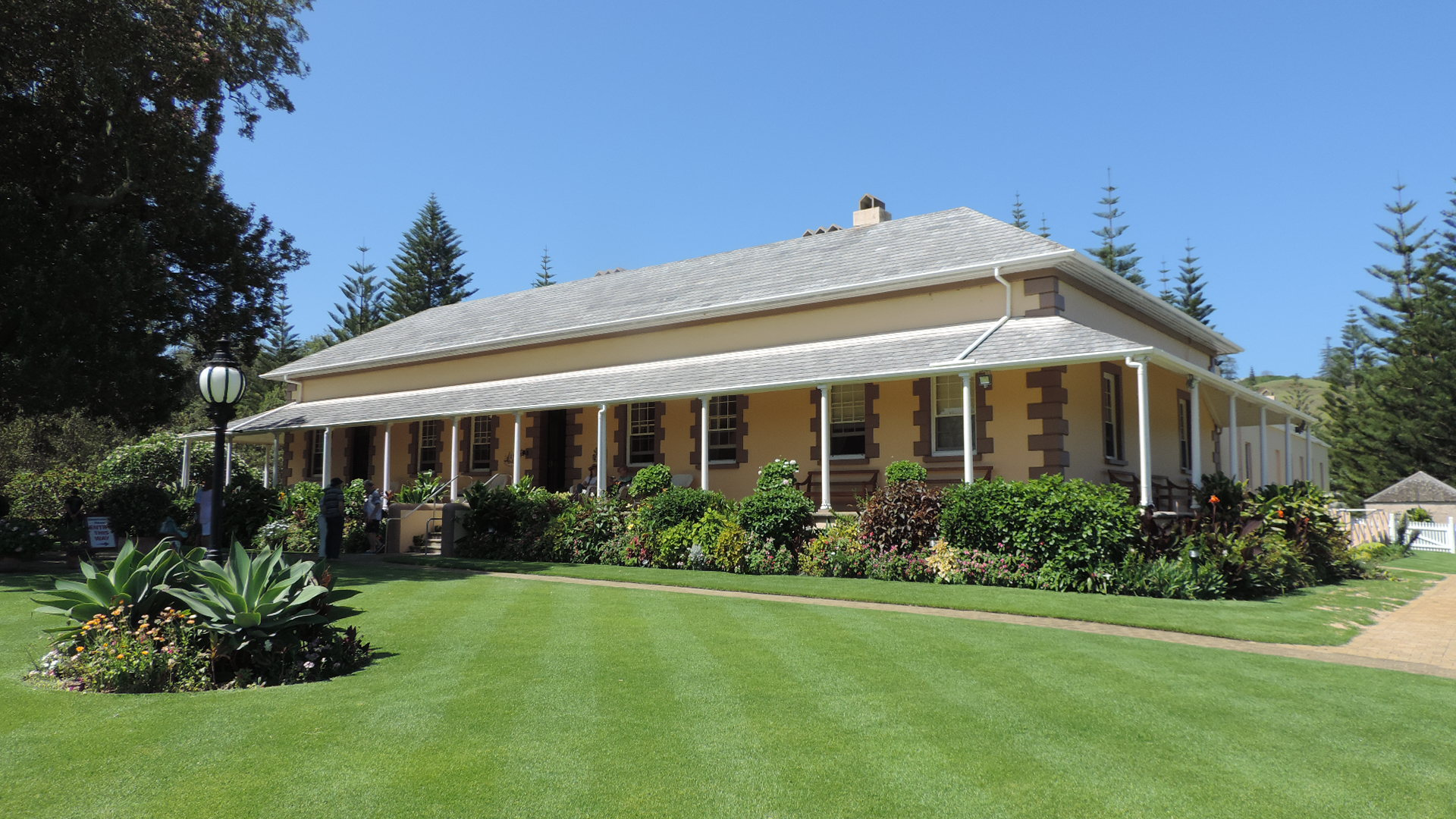
Government House, Norfolk Island, 2015

Government House is the official residence of the Administrator of Norfolk Island, located on the Australian external territory of Norfolk Island. It was built in 1829 and, as part of the Kingston and Arthurs Vale Historic Area, is listed on the Australian National Heritage List and as a UNESCO World Heritage site.

Government House is situated in the settlement of Kingston in the south of Norfolk Island.
