= Ngebedech Terraces =

The Ngebedech Terraces, or Ouballang ra Ngebedech, are located in the southwestern part of Babeldaob, the largest island in Palau.

== Site description ==
The area covers over 160,000 sq m of grassland savannah in upland Babeldaob. The terraces performed multiple functions that include, according to UNESCO, "agriculture, settlement, defense, and ceremonial functions." Morgan (1988) argues that these terraces might be linked into larger more extended systems of complex topography.

== World Heritage Status ==
This site was added to the UNESCO World Heritage Tentative List on in the Cultural category.
