= Protected areas of American Samoa =

This is a list of protected areas of American Samoa.

Area name	Type	Year Established	Photo
National Marine Sanctuary of American Samoa (formerly Fagatele Bay National Marine Sanctuary)	National Marine Sanctuary	1986	
National Park of American Samoa	National Park	October 31, 1988	
Rose Atoll National Wildlife Refuge	National Wildlife Refuge	1973	
Rose Atoll Marine National Monument	Marine National Monument	2009	

== Local marine protected areas ==
- Alofau Village Marine Protected Area
- Amaua and Auto Village Marine Protected Area
- Fagamalo Village Marine Protected Area
- Masausi Village Marine Protected Area
- Matuu and Faganeanea Village Marine Protected Area
- Poloa Village Marine Protected Area
- Vatia Village Marine Protected Area
