= Woolmers Estate =

Heritage place in Longford, Tasmania

Coordinates: 41.62525°S 147.148167°E

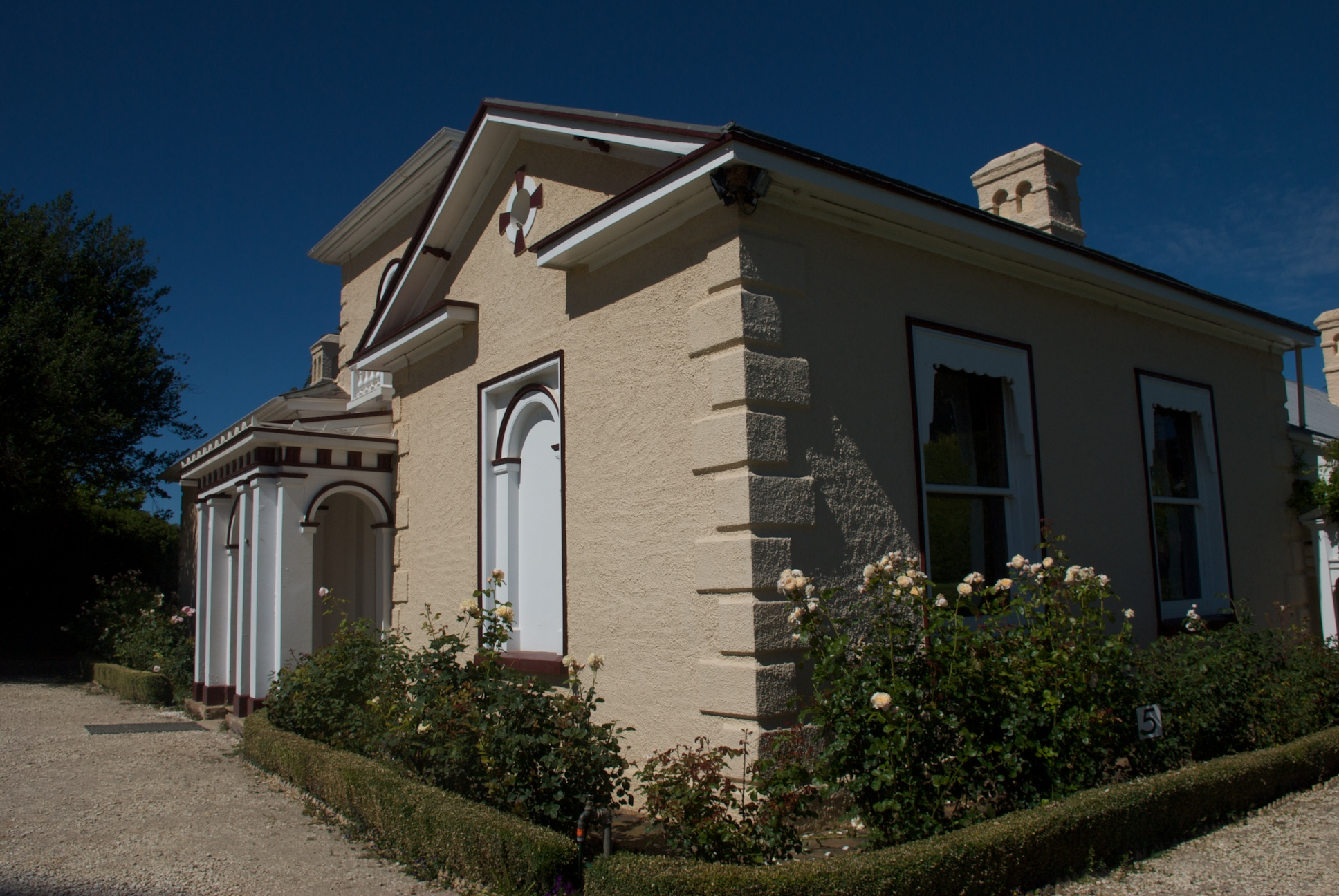
- The front entrance of the Woolmers main house.
- Interactive map of the Woolmers Estate area

General information
- Architectural style: Italianate
- Location: Woolmers Lane, Longford TAS 7301, Longford, Tasmania, Australia
- Construction started: 1819
- Completed: 1843
- Owner: Woolmers Foundation Inc.

Design and construction
- Architect: William Archer

Website
- woolmers.com.au

UNESCO World Heritage Site
- Type: Cultural
- Criteria: iv, vi
- Designated: 2010 (34th session)
- Part of: Australian Convict Sites
- Reference no.: 1306
- Region: Asia-Pacific

Woolmers Estate is a farming estate located in Longford, Tasmania, founded in 1817 by prominent grazier and member of parliament Thomas Archer. It consists of an 82ha property, including a two-part manor house, coach house, the National Rose Garden, extensive outbuildings and convict cottages and formal gardens. The main house consists of a brick nog weatherboard homestead, built in 1819, with an attached extensive addition in Italiate style, designed by William Archer and built in 1842-1843. From the 1819 completion of the main house to 1994, it was one of the main ancestral homes of the Archer family.

It is listed on the Tasmanian Heritage Register. Along with Brickendon Estate, Woolmers was inscribed onto the Australian National Heritage List in November 2007 as being of outstanding national significance because of their close association with the convict consignment system and in July 2010 included on the World Heritage list as Australian Convict Sites and amongst the world's

" .. best surviving examples of large-scale convict transportation and the colonial expansion of European powers through the presence and labour of convicts"

== Name ==
Like most Archer properties, Woolmers was named after an English location or building - Woolmer's Park, in Hertfordshire.

== National Rose Garden ==
The Woolmers Estate features the National Rose Garden, which was begun in 1999 and fundraised by public donation. It has 460 varieties of rose, and over 5000 individual plants.

== History ==
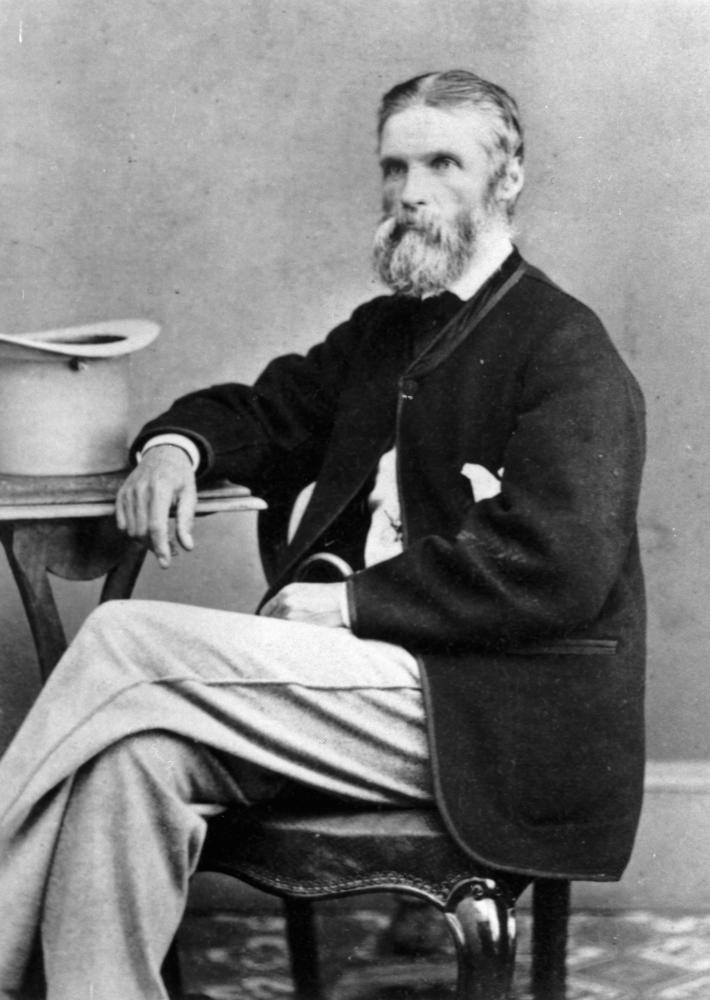
Thomas Archer I

In 1812, Thomas Archer arrived in New South Wales on the ship Guilford, with a letter of introduction from Lord Liverpool acquired from the influence of his uncle, proprietor of the London Courier. He achieved success as a public servant, starting as a Clerk in the Sydney Commissariat before being appointed acting deputy assistant commissary in November of that year. He was transferred to Port Dalrymple (modern George Town) as clerk in charge, in 1813. He was made magistrate in 1814 and coroner of Cornwall County in 1816. He married his wife Susan Hortle the same year. Various other promotions followed but he retired in 1821 to focus on his farm. In 1817, he had been granted 800 acres, which formed the core of his Woolmers Estate. By 1819, the very first part of modern Woolmers - the weatherboard section of the main house - was under construction, using wood logged on the property.
