= Cheshunt House =

- Interactive map of the Cheshunt House area
- Alternative names: Cheshunt Estate

General information
- Type: Mansion
- Architectural style: Italianate
- Location: Cheshunt Road, Meander, Australia
- Coordinates: 41°37′19″S 146°35′04″E
- Construction started: 1851
- Completed: 1885
- Owner: Bowman family

Design and construction
- Architect: William Archer

Cheshunt House is an Italianate mansion in the Meander Valley, Tasmania, 10 kilometers from Deloraine. It was designed and originally owned by politician, botanist and architect William Archer, started in 1851-52. It was purchased incomplete by the Bowman Brothers from William Archer in 1873, who completed it to his design in 1885. It fell into disrepair during the period of the World Wars and the Great Depression, before a restoration project was undertaken by the family in the 1970s. It is still owned by the Bowman family.

Cheshunt House is listed on the Tasmanian Heritage Register, and was on the Register of the National Estate until that list was replaced. The house was featured on a stamp issued by Australia Post in 2004.
