= Brickendon Estate =

House and estate in Longford, Tasmania, Australia

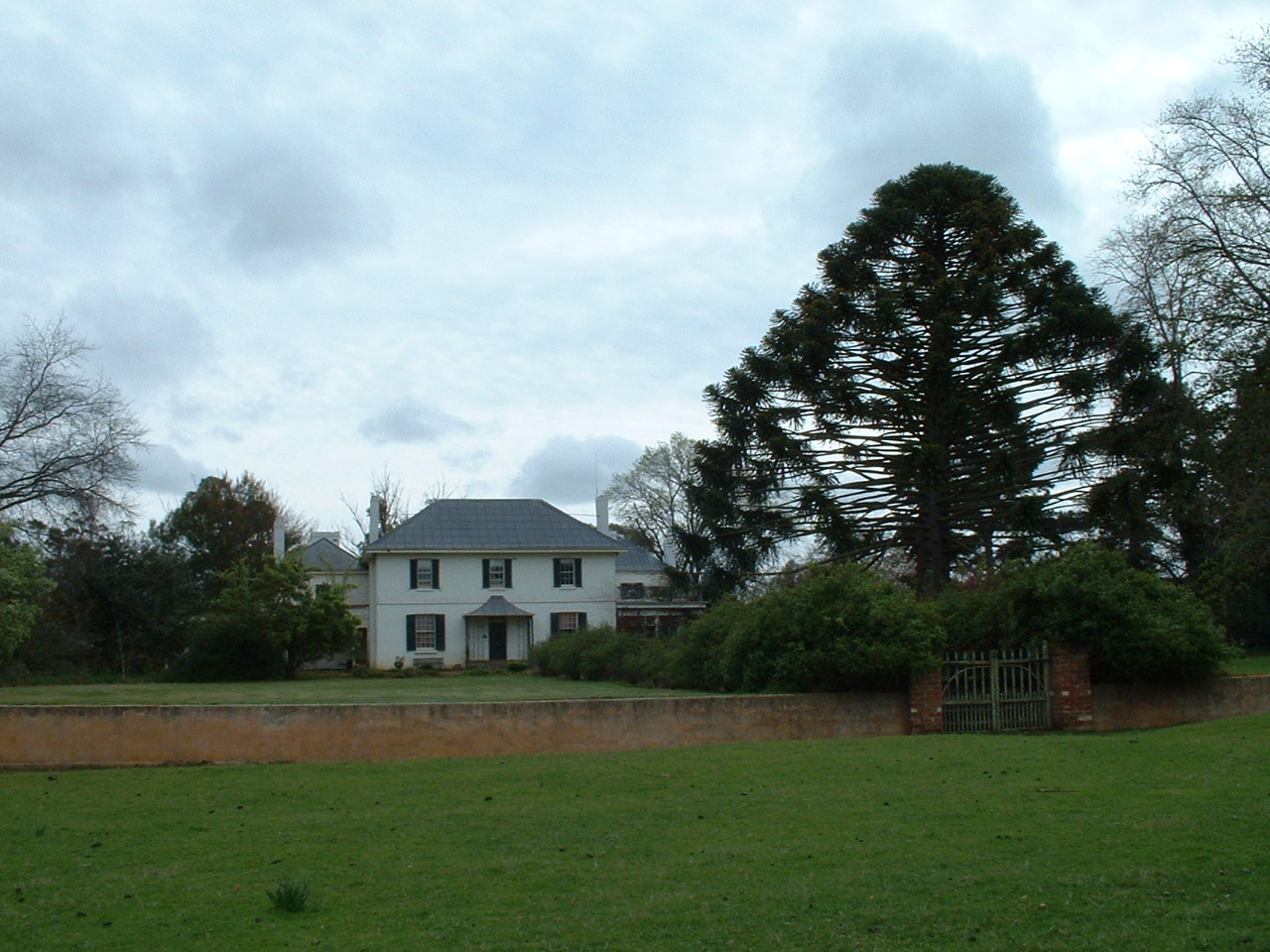
- Brickendon's main manor house
- Interactive map of the Brickendon Estate area

General information
- Architectural style: Georgian
- Location: Longford, Tasmania, Australia
- Coordinates: 41°36′58″S 147°07′52″E
- Construction started: 1829
- Completed: 1830
- Owner: Archer family

Website
- Brickendon

UNESCO World Heritage Site
- Type: Cultural
- Criteria: iv, vi
- Designated: 2010 (34th session)
- Part of: Australian Convict Sites
- Reference no.: 1306
- Region: Asia-Pacific

Brickendon Estate is a farm estate located in Longford, Tasmania. It is one of the two main ancestral homes (with Woolmers) of the Archer family, prominent local pioneers and politicians.

Founded in 1824, Brickendon Estate was one of the first (and most successful) farms in the area. Like most Archer estates, it is named after a location in England, in this case, the village of Brickendon in East Hertfordshire. It consists of a village and manor house, as well as a 465 ha (1,150-acre) working farm. The main manor was built in 1829-1830 in a Georgian style.

It has been lived on and operated by direct descendants of the Archer family since it was established, and is still a working farm.

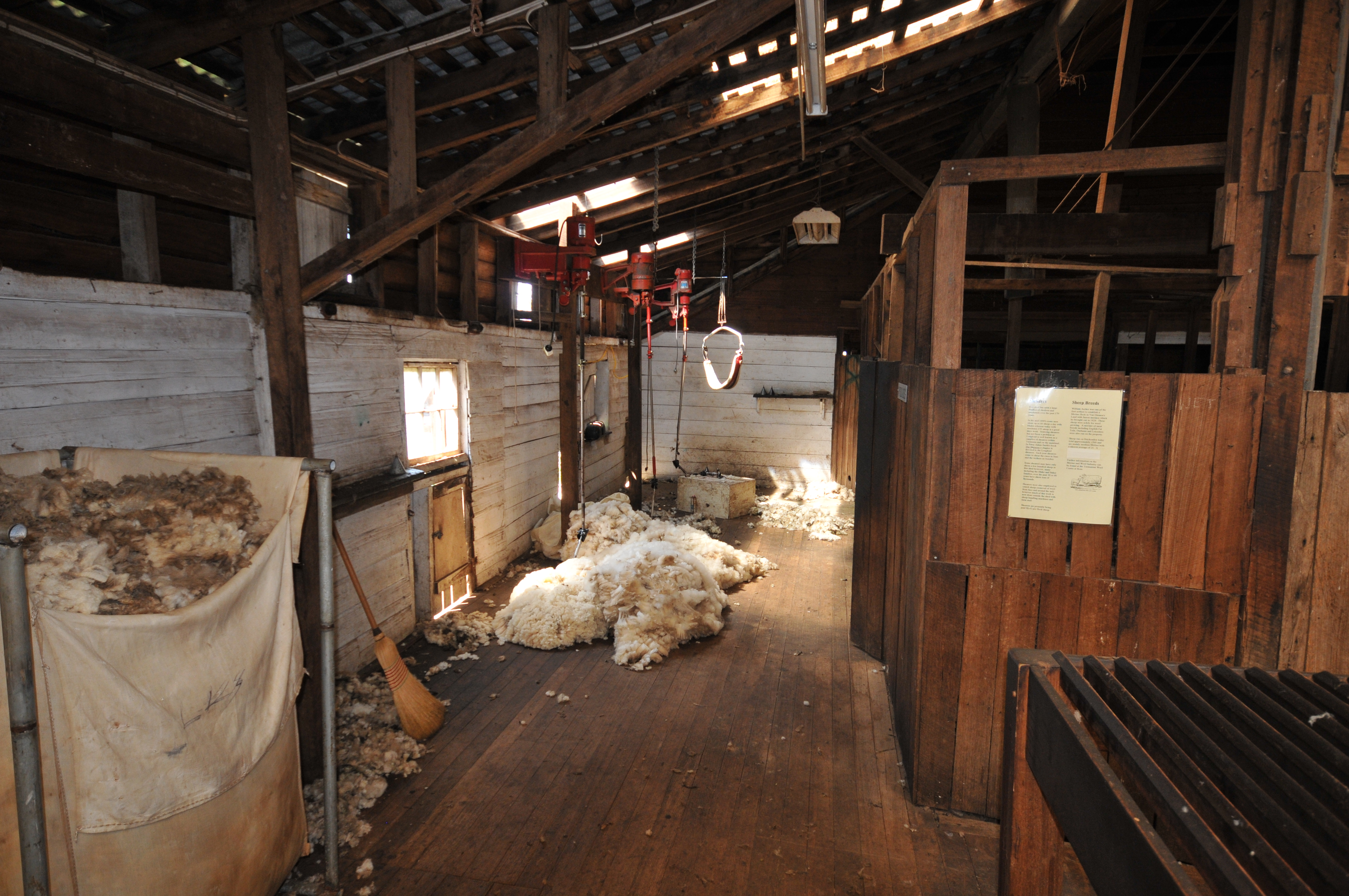
Interior of the Brickendon shearing shed

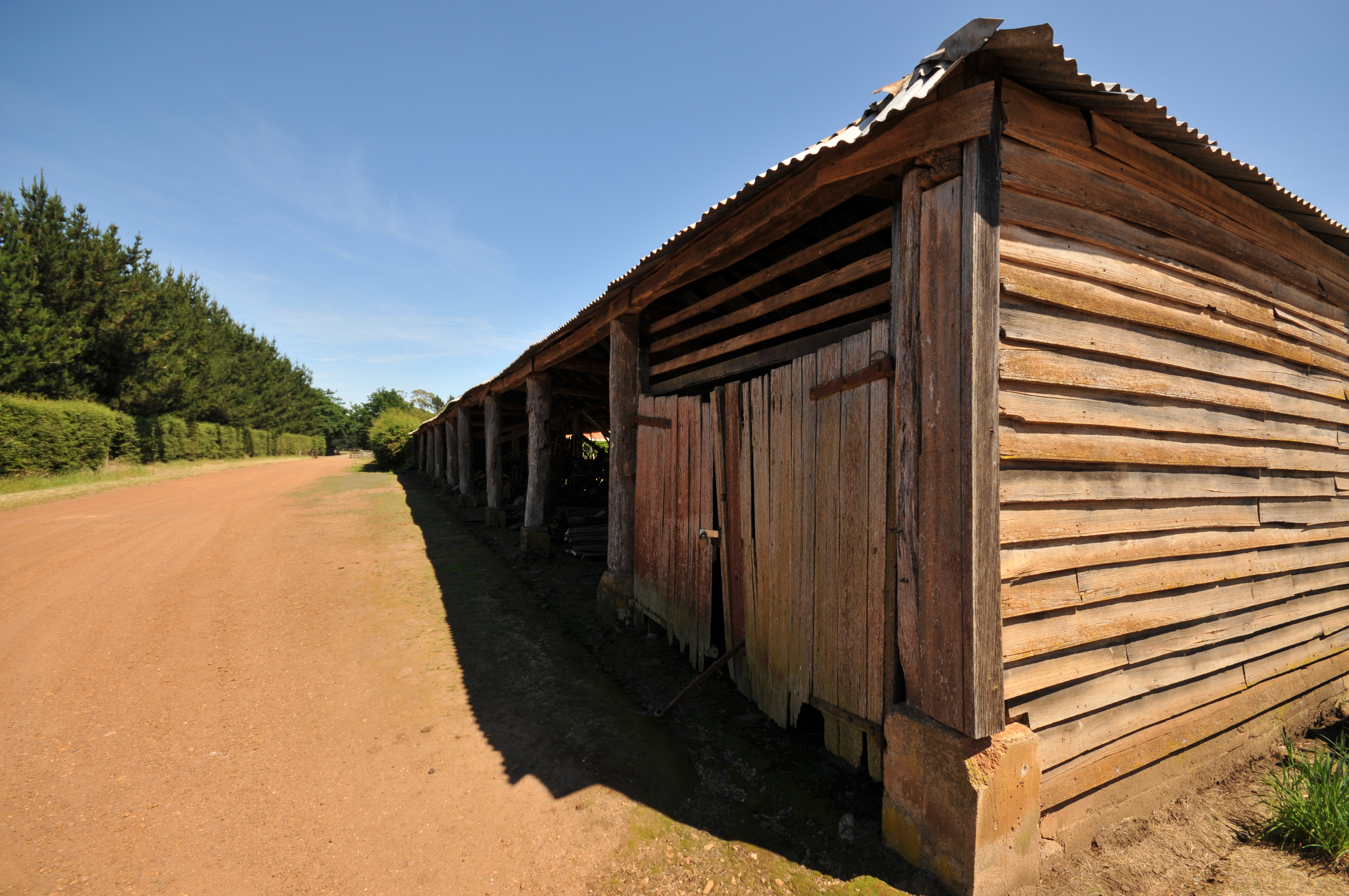
Exterior of the Brickendown machinery shed

It is listed on the Tasmanian Heritage Register. Along with Woolmers Estate, Brickendon was inscribed onto the Australian National Heritage List in November 2007 as being of outstanding national significance because of their close association with the convict consignment system and in July 2010 included on the World Heritage list as Australian Convict Sites and amongst the world's "best surviving examples of large-scale convict transportation and the colonial expansion of European powers through the presence and labour of convicts"

It is now a popular tourism destination offering farm activities, heritage accommodation, garden tours, and wedding/functions venue.

== Gallery ==
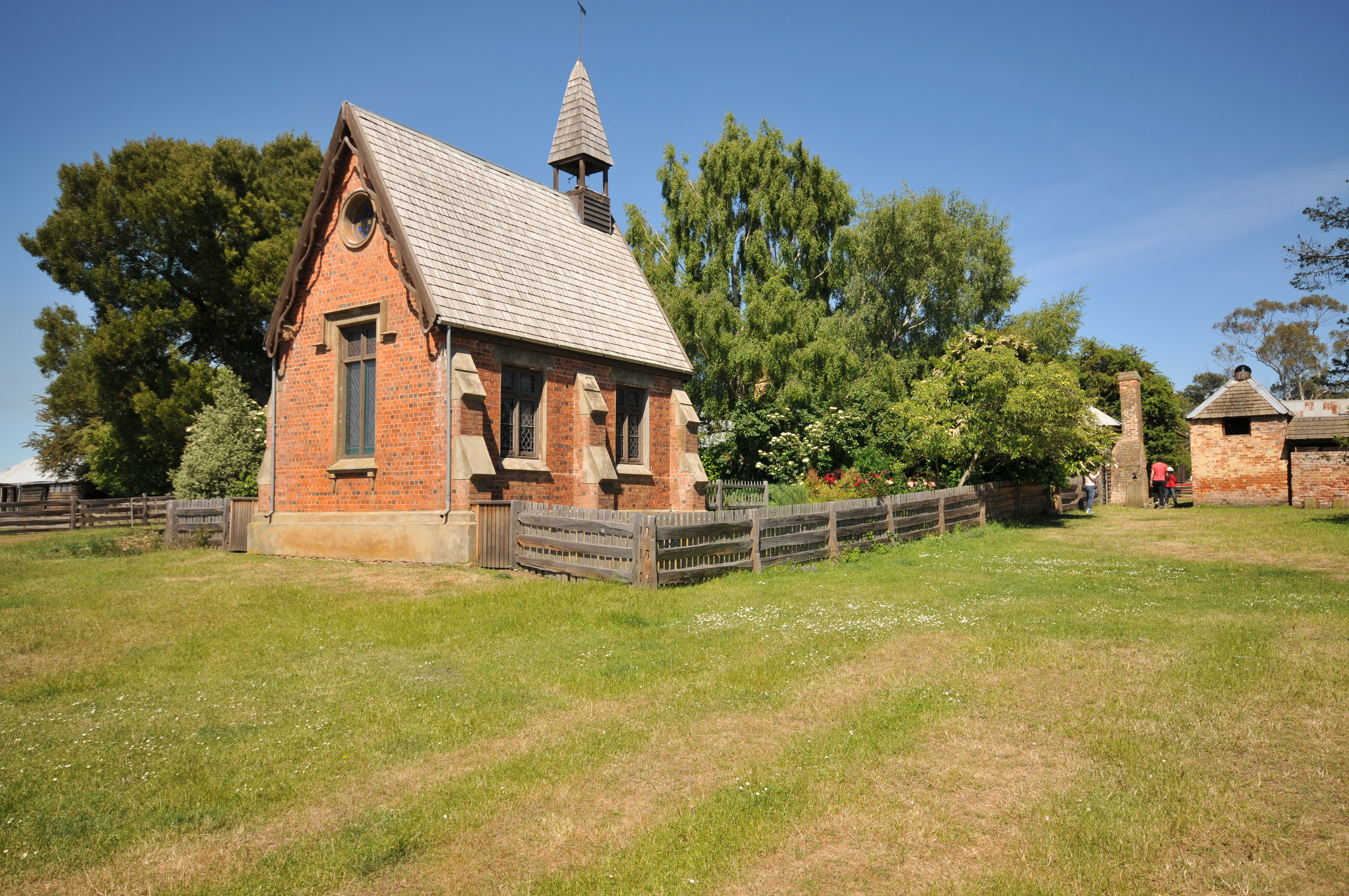
Chapel

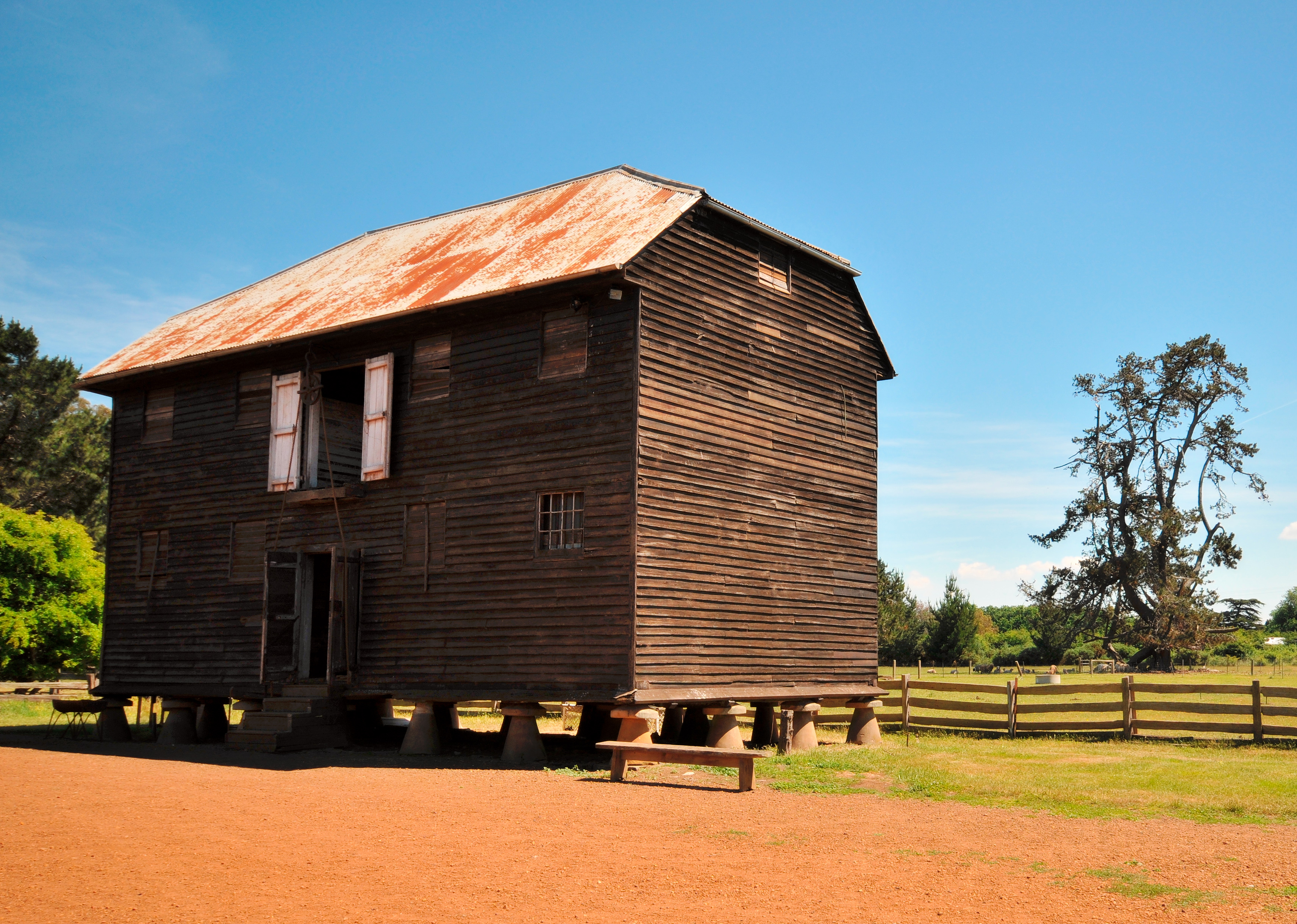
Grainhouse

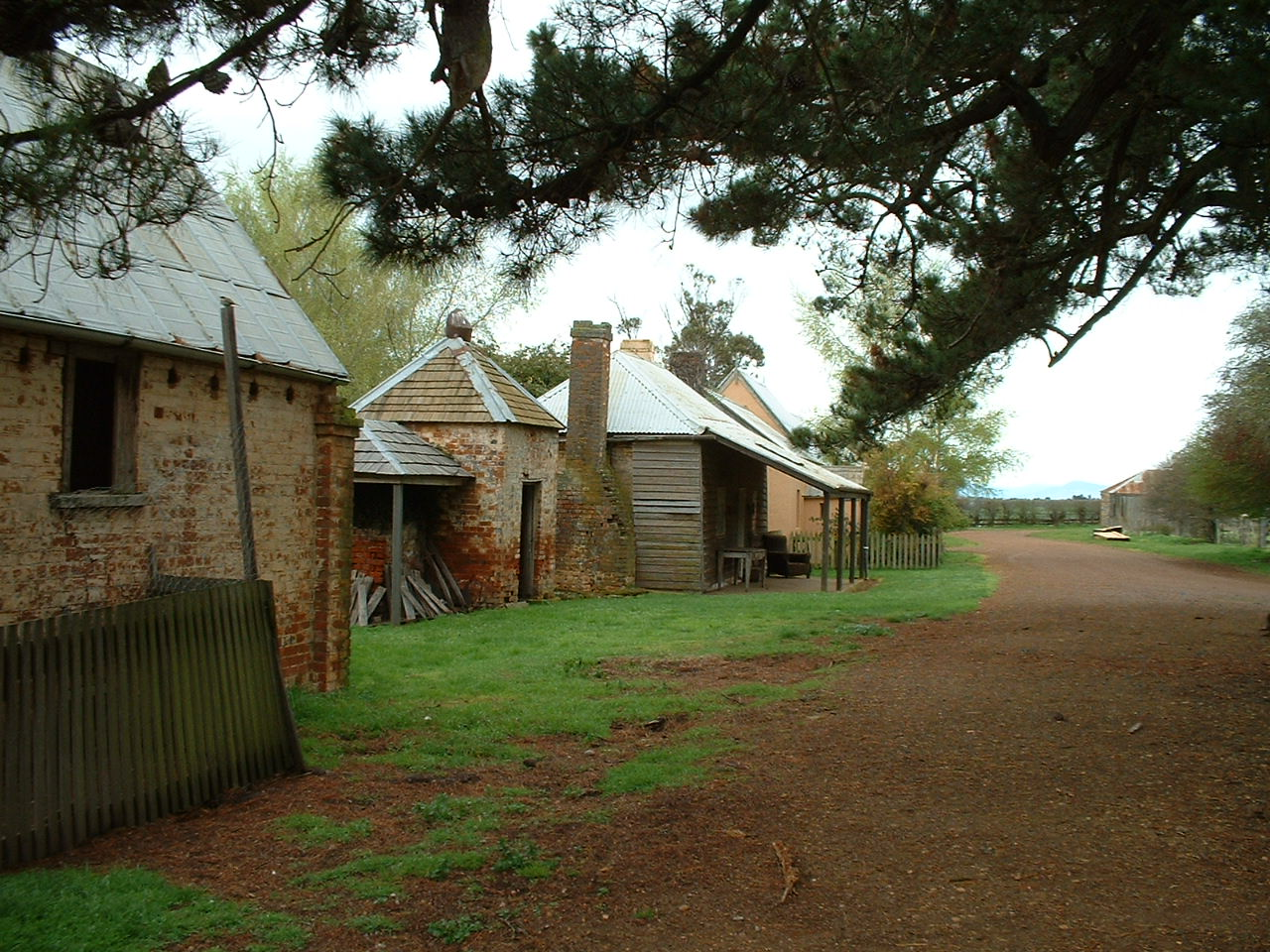
Farm buildings

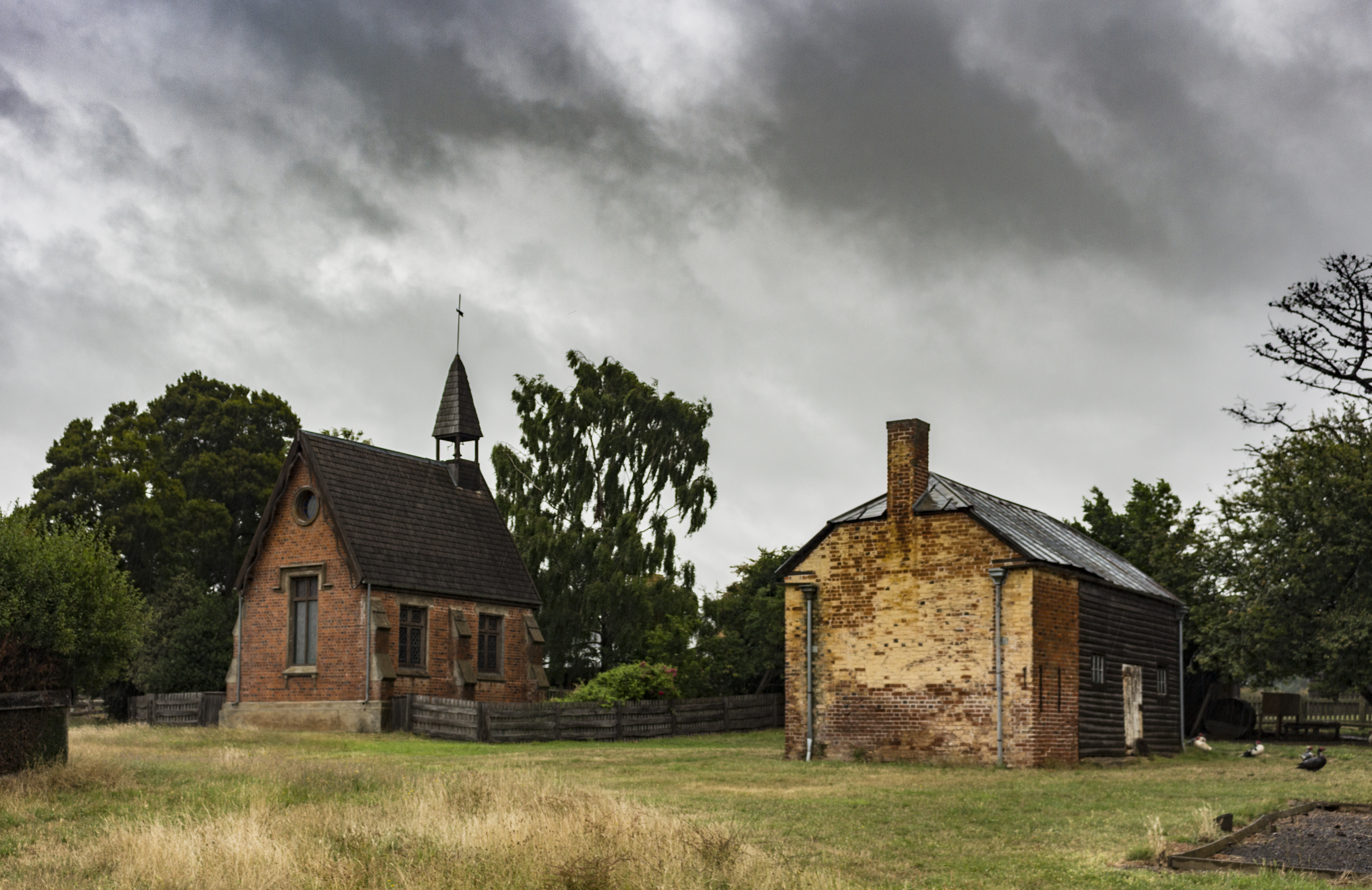
Brickendon in 2017

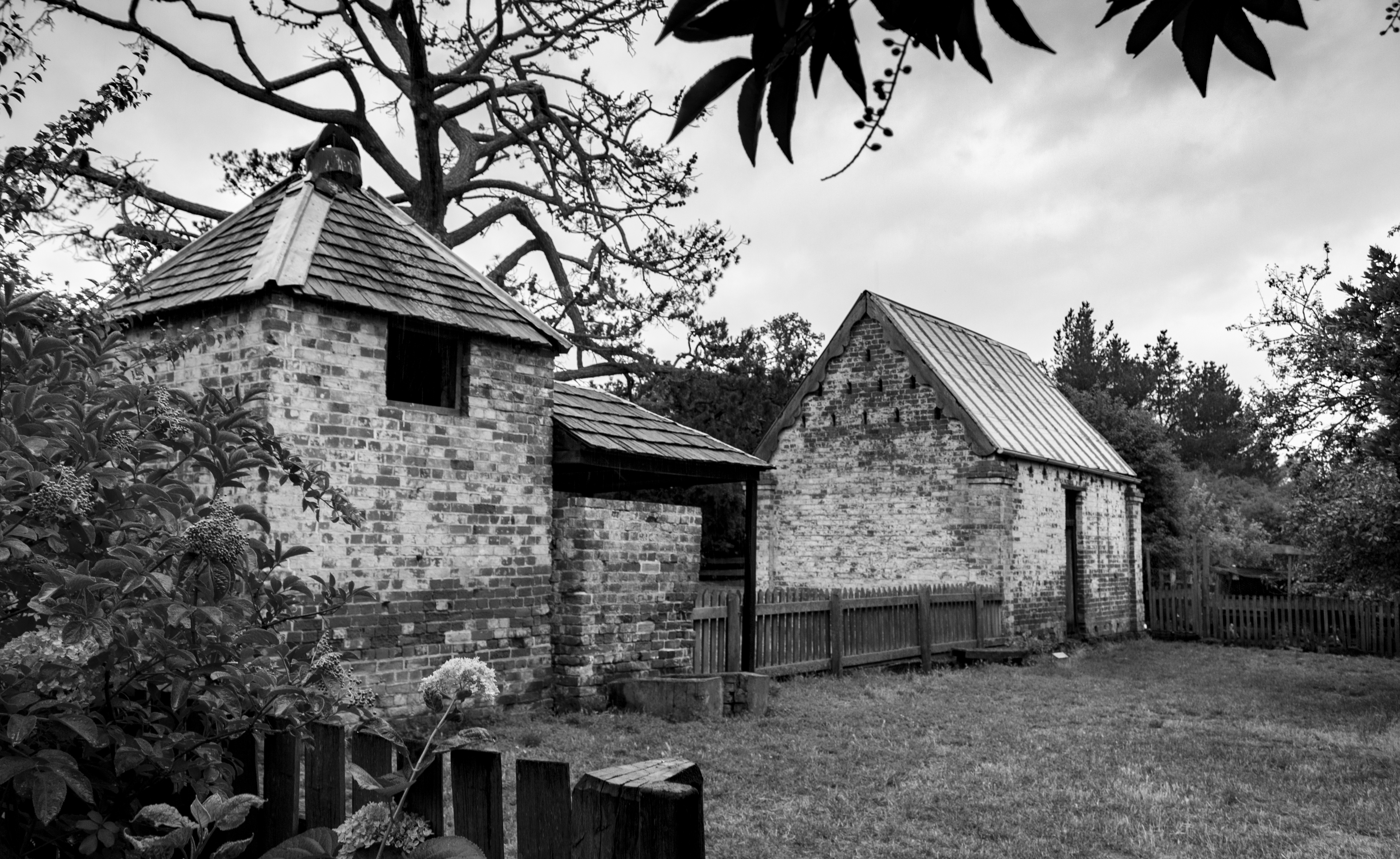
Brickendon buildings
