= Mona Vale, Tasmania =

House in Ross, Tasmania, Australia

Coordinates: 42.09251°S 147.50262°E

Mona Vale
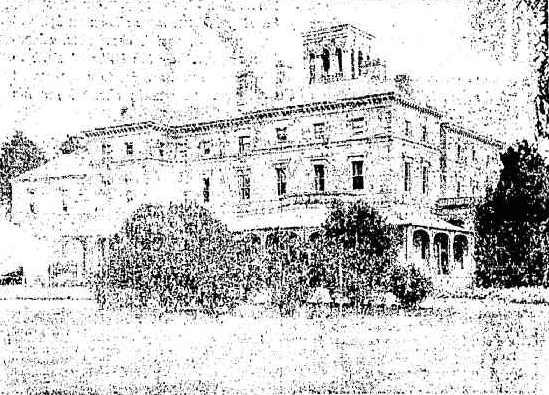
- Sketch of Mona Vale from 1927
- Interactive map of the Mona Vale area

General information
- Completed: 1867

Design and construction
- Architect: William Archer

Other information
- Number of rooms: 52

Mona Vale is a large heritage listed 1860s country house in Ross, Tasmania. Completed in 1867, it is well known locally as the "Calendar House", for its reportedly 365 windows, 52 rooms, 12 chimneys and seven entrances. The property is on the Tasmanian Heritage Register and the Register of the National Estate (since 1978).

== Etymology ==
The origin of the name of Mona Vale is disputed. Jupp, J lists it as named after Castle Mona, a historic home of the Duke of Atholl and presently a hotel. Bennet, A states that the name is derived from Monaeoda, the Latin name for the Isle of Man.

== History ==
Mona Vale was built by Robert Kermode and designed by William Archer, his brother-in-law. At the time of its completion, it became the largest private house in Australia. It has received multiple royal visits over its lifetime. In 1868, Alfred, Duke of Edinburgh visited, and later the then Duke of York (future King George VI) and the Duchess of York visited in 1927, with then Princess Elizabeth (Elizabeth II). It was purchased by the Cameron family in the 1920s. The estate was also the site of a military training ground, and the camp of a light horse regiment during WWII.
