= Australian Convict Sites =

UNESCO World Heritage Site
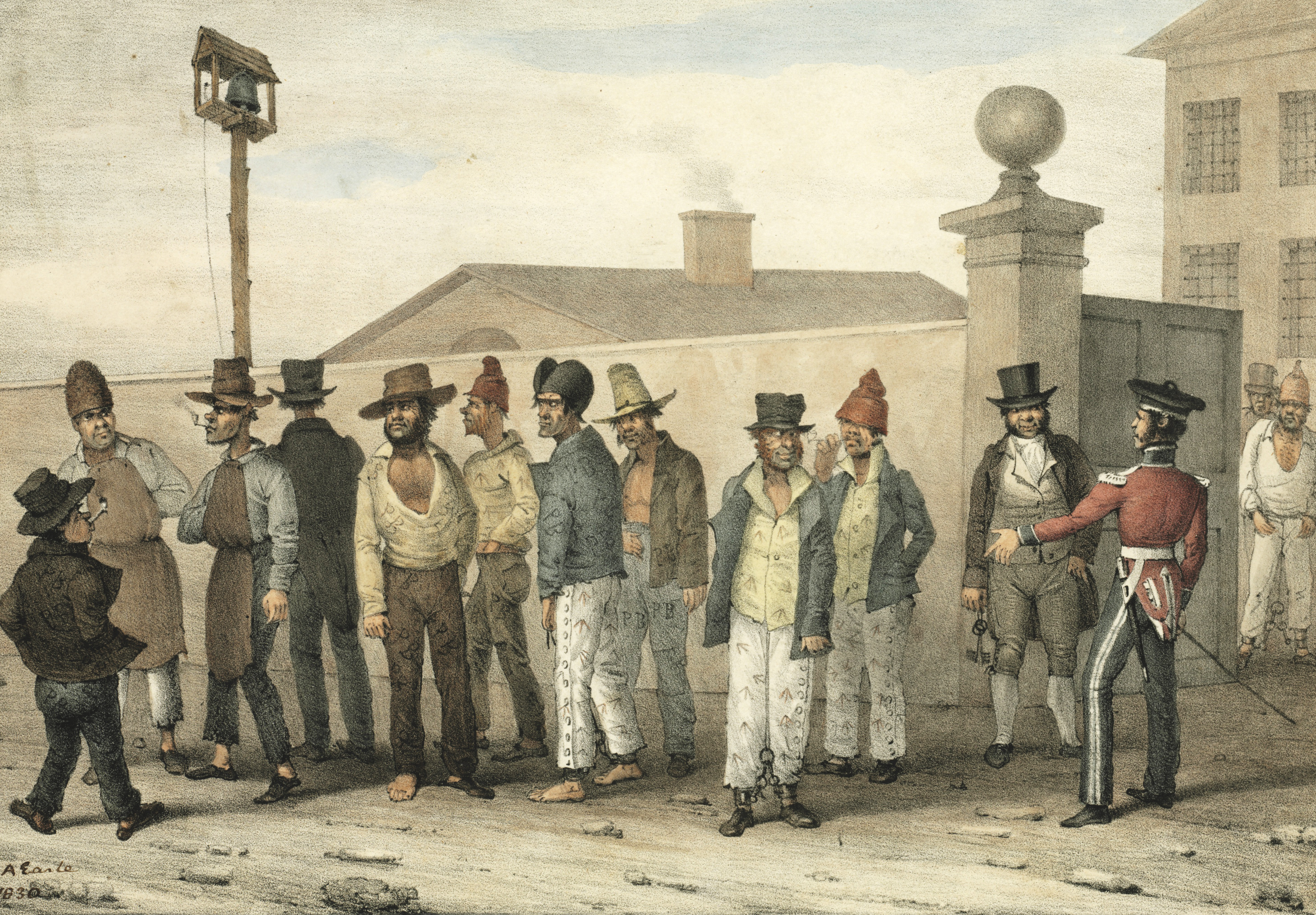
- 1830 illustration of convicts in front of the Hyde Park Barracks, one of the eleven sites that form the Australian Convict Sites
- Location: Australia
- Criteria: Cultural: iv, vi
- Reference: 1306
- Inscription: 2010 (34th Session)
- Area: 1,502.51 hectares (5.8012 sq mi)
- Buffer zone: 3,887.63 hectares (15.0102 sq mi)

The Australian Convict Sites are a World Heritage Site that consists of eleven penal sites associated with convict transportation to Australia. The sites were constructed during the 18th and 19th centuries, a period during which around 166,000 people were transported to Australia. Convicts were sent to Australia for a range of offences, including committing petty crimes and supporting particular political causes. Convicts were subjected to forced labour, which was used as a means of deterrence and rehabilitation, and as a way of developing the Australian colonies. Several thousand sites, including prisons and labour facilities, were established across Australia to support the convict system. The eleven designated sites served varied functions, including development of the colony's land and exploitation of its natural resources, deterrence of crime through secondary punishment, and rehabilitation of convicts.

The Australian government began preparing a World Heritage nomination of a series of sites associated with convict transportation in 1995. In 2000, the government of John Howard announced a shortlist of eight sites, which were added to Australia's tentative list. In 2007, the Australian government announced a refined shortlist of eleven convict sites. The eleven sites are spread across Australia, with one site located on Norfolk Island, one in Western Australia, four in New South Wales, and the remaining five in Tasmania. The Australian Convict Sites nomination was submitted to UNESCO in January 2008.

The Australian Convict sites were inscribed on the World Heritage List at the 34th Session of the World Heritage Committee in 2010. They were described as representing the "best surviving examples of large-scale convict transportation and the colonial expansion of European powers through the presence and labour of convicts". The sites were deemed to meet criteria 4 (illustrating a significant stage in human history) and 6 (being directly associated with events of outstanding universal significance) of the selection criteria for cultural sites.

== Sites ==
Australian Convict Sites
Name	Image	Location	UNESCO ID Property area	Description
Kingston and Arthur's Vale Historic Area	Stone walled prison complex on a grassy coastal area, with the ocean and ships visible beyond	Norfolk Island 29°03′12″S 167°57′31″E	1306-001 225 ha (560 acres)	The Kingston and Arthur's Vale Historic Area is a former convict settlement on Norfolk Island, located 1600 kilometres (990 miles) north-east of Sydney. After an initial attempt at settlement was abandoned in 1814, the island was re-occupied in 1825 as a site for secondary punishment of convicts who re-offended while in Australia. The site contains two precincts. The administrative precinct is home to Government House, the Old and New Military Barracks, the Commissariat Store, and a row of officers' houses. The convict precinct contains the archaeological remains of the prisoners' barracks and gaols, as well as chapels and guard houses. The foreshore contains a range of industrial sites in which convicts worked, including a pier, hand-cranked corn mill, blacksmith workshop, and the archaeological remains of a lumberyard and a quarry.
Old Government House and Domain	Two-storey colonial-era building with a columned entrance	New South Wales 33°48′35″S 150°59′42″E	1306-002 37.25 ha (92.0 acres)	Old Government House, located in Parramatta to the west of Sydney, was the residence of the Governor of New South Wales between 1788 and 1856. It was the site from which the convict system was administered and overseen. Initially built as a modest cottage for Governor Arthur Phillip, Government House eventually developed into a more elaborate Georgian home. The site also features the quarters of the governor's female convict servants, and the archaeological remains of convict-built roads and convict huts. After the city's administrative centre shifted from Parramatta to central Sydney, the home began to be used as a rural retreat for the colony's governor and was then eventually leased out.
Hyde Park Barracks	Brick institutional building with an arched entrance and stone gateposts	New South Wales 33°52′10″S 151°12′45″E	1306-003 0.5 ha (1.2 acres)	The Hyde Park Barracks, designed by the architect Francis Greenway, was Australia's first government-built barracks for the housing of convicts. While convicts were initially responsible for their own housing arrangements, a rise in transportation and concerns about a lack of government control led to the construction of barracks to house 600 male convicts. Each of its three floors contains six dormitories and six smaller rooms in which convicts slept on canvas hammocks. Its residents initially worked on public works projects during the day before returning to the barracks at night. However, the barracks were eventually used as a trial depot and site for secondary punishment of male convicts who re-offended; they were subjected to solitary confinement, hard labour, and lashings. The barracks were later repurposed into an asylum for single immigrant women.
Brickendon and Woolmers Estates	Colonial house with large trees and a lawn	Tasmania 41°37′30″S 147°8′30″E	1306-004 233.52 ha (577.0 acres)	Brickendon Estate and Woolmers Estate are two neighbouring Tasmanian farming properties constructed in the 1820s. The properties were constructed and staffed through the convict assignment system, in which convicts were assigned to free settlers to develop the colony's land and infrastructure. About 85% of convicts in Australia spent part of their sentence employed through this system. Convicts worked on the properties until the late 1850s in a range of roles, including as domestic servants, blacksmiths, and agricultural labourers.
Darlington Probation Station	Stone building with a steep roof standing alone in a grassy field, with low hills in the background	Tasmania 42°34′54″S 148°4′12″E	1306-005 361 ha (890 acres)	The Darlington Probation Station, which sits within the Maria Island National Park on the east coast of Tasmania, was one of Tasmania's 78 probation stations. After initially operating as a penal settlement, the site began operating as the colony's first probation station in 1842 with the goal of better rehabilitating the colony's convict population. Convicts were separated into three classes representing stages of reform and were employed in probationary gangs. The station placed an emphasis on discipline, education, and religious observance. After reaching a peak of 492 convicts in 1846, the station was closed in 1850.
Old Great North Road	Steep rock cutting beside a narrow road	New South Wales 33°22′42″S 150°59′40″E	1306-006 258.64 ha (639.1 acres)	The Old Great North Road is a road from Sydney to the Hunter Valley constructed by convicts between 1826 and 1836. The World Heritage Site includes a 7.5-kilometre (4.7 mi) section of the 250-kilometre (160 mi) road, including a 2.5-kilometre (1.6 mi) stretch on Devine's Hill and a 5-kilometre (3.1 mi) stretch known as Finch's Line. Road construction was used as a method of secondary punishment for convicts who re-offended in the colonies, with convicts tasked with quarrying sandstone by hand to form walls and drainage systems. Convicts working on the road were provided with limited rations and were at times housed in rough huts and portable wooden boxes. The road is now a walking and cycling trail.
Cascades Female Factory	Walled stone courtyard with low ruins in the foreground	Tasmania 42°53′37″S 147°17′57″E	1306-007 0.6 ha (1.5 acres)	The Cascades Female Factory was Tasmania's primary site for the imprisonment of female convicts. More than half of the convict women transported to Australia spent time at the Cascades Female Factory. The female factory opened in 1828 and was also home to a nursery, working facilities, and a hospital. Overcrowding and disease led to high mortality rates: in its first decade, 208 of 794 children born or housed in the factory died. Women were incarcerated at the Female Factory until they were seen as sufficiently rehabilitated to be released to domestic service. The site was later used as a prison, an asylum, and a hospital. Today, the site consists of three of the original five yards, as well as the Matron's Cottage and the ruins of the original perimeter wall.
Port Arthur Historic Site	Large stone institutional complex beside a body of water, with wooded hills rising behind it	Tasmania 43°8′52″S 147°51′00″E	1306-008 146 ha (360 acres)	The Port Arthur Historic Site is an 1830s penal settlement located in Tasmania. The site contains about 30 structures built by convicts, including an industrial complex, multiple prisons (including a panopticon and separate juvenile prison), and administrative and military facilities. The site was known as one of the country's harsher penal colonies, and housed many convicts who re-offended while in Australia. The site was later used to house the poor and mentally ill.
Coal Mines Historic Site	Stone wall ruins with three openings	Tasmania 42°59′01″S 147°42′59″E	1306-009 214 ha (530 acres)	The Coal Mines Historic Site is a former coal mine located on the northern Tasman Peninsula. It began to be mined by convicts in the 1830s and eventually produced a total of 60,000 tonnes of coal. Coal mining was regarded as a particularly harsh form of additional punishment, and convicts were employed in the coal mines and in the surrounding quarries, tanneries, and brick kilns. The site contains the remains of the prisoners' barracks and solitary punishment cells, as well as industrial facilities, including shafts, quarries, kilns, and a coal wharf and jetties.
Cockatoo Island Convict Site	Aerial view of an island complex with cranes, docks, and buildings	New South Wales 33°50′51″S 151°10′19″E	1306-010 20 ha (49 acres)	Cockatoo Island is an island in Sydney Harbour that contains a variety of convict-built structures, including a barracks, a hospital, and a dry dock. It was primarily used as a site for secondary punishment through hard labour for convicts who re-offended. Convicts quarried rock to prepare a site for the construction of the 114-metre Fitzroy Dock, and hand-excavated rock silos 5.7 metres deep and 6 metres wide for the storage of wheat. The island's barracks were designed to house 328 men, but eventually housed up to 500. In the late 19th century, the island was used as a girls' industrial school and reformatory, and as a prison. During the 20th century, the island was repurposed for the construction and repair of ships for the Royal Australian Navy.
Fremantle Prison	Long stone prison building with rows of small windows	Western Australia 32°03′18″S 115°45′13″E	1306-011 6 ha (15 acres)	Fremantle Prison was constructed during the 1850s soon after the arrival of the first convicts in Western Australia. It was built by convicts from locally quarried limestone and could house up to 1000 prisoners in its main cell block. Its architecture was based on the panopticon-inspired design of HM Prison Pentonville in London. The prison was designed based on the principles of the separate system, which viewed complete solitude and segregation of prisoners as the best method for reform. During its time in operation, the prison later functioned as a domestic prison and as a wartime internment camp.

== Maps ==
Location of sites (Tasmania excluded)	Location of sites in Tasmania

== See also ==
- List of World Heritage Sites in Australia
