= Members of the Tasmanian House of Assembly, 1900–1903 =

This is a list of members of the Tasmanian House of Assembly between the 1900 election and the 1903 election.

Party affiliations were relatively loose during the period, although a Liberal grouping had formed over the 1890s around Sir Edward Braddon, the former Premier of Tasmania, and Andrew Inglis Clark. A separate grouping, generally described as Ministerial, supported Elliott Lewis, who was Premier for the entire parliamentary term. Only one Labor candidate ran in the election, in only the second contest entered by the party.

The 1900 election was the second to use a limited version of the Hare-Clark system within Hobart and Launceston, which were given 6 and 4 seats respectively, while still using first past the post single-member constituencies elsewhere in the state. Following this term, the system largely returned to its pre–1897 state, but at the 1909 election, the entire State was redivided into five six-seat electorates using the Hare-Clark system.

Name	Party	District	Years in office
William Aikenhead^{[5]}	Liberal	Latrobe	1898–1902
Frank Archer^{[7]}	Liberal	Selby	1893–1902
Jonathan Best	Ministerial/Liberal	Deloraine	1894–1897; 1899–1912; 1913
Stafford Bird	Ministerial	Franklin	1882–1903; 1904–1909
Sir Edward Braddon^{[3]}	Liberal	West Devon	1879–1888; 1893–1901
John Bradley^{[2]}	Ministerial	Hobart	1893–1900
Nicholas John Brown	Independent/Ministerial	Cumberland	1875–1903
William Brown	Liberal/Independent	Campbell Town	1882–1889; 1893–1903
William Burbury	Independent/Ministerial	Oatlands	1899–1903
Daniel Burke	Ministerial	Cressy	1893–1903
Edward Crowther	Ministerial	Kingborough	1878–1912
John George Davies	Ministerial/Independent	Fingal	1884–1913
Henry Dumaresq	Ministerial	Longford	1886–1903
John Evans	Independent/Ministerial	Kingborough	1897–1937
Alexander Fowler^{[4]}	Independent	Launceston	1893; 1897–1901
James Gaffney	Ministerial	Lyell	1899–1903
William Guesdon	Independent/Ministerial	Hobart	1882–1886; 1900–1903
Charles Hall	Independent/Liberal	Waratah	1897–1903
John Hamilton	Ministerial	Glenorchy	1887–1903
William Hartnoll^{[6]}	Ministerial	Launceston	1884–1902
Thomas Hodgman	Independent/Liberal	Brighton	1900–1912
Charles Hoggins^{[2]}	Liberal/Ministerial	Hobart	1898–1900; 1900–1903; 1917–1919
John Hope	Ministerial	Devonport	1900–1911
George Leatham	Ministerial	New Norfolk	1891–1903; 1906–1909
Elliott Lewis	Ministerial	Richmond	1886–1903; 1909–1922
Carmichael Lyne	Independent/Liberal	Ringarooma	1900–1906
Sir John McCall^{[3]}	Liberal	West Devon	1888–1893; 1901–1909
Peter McCrackan	Liberal	Launceston	1900–1903
Charles Mackenzie	Ministerial	Wellington	1886–1909
Thomas Massey^{[7]}	Liberal	Selby	1902–1903
Edward Miles^{[1]}	Liberal	Hobart	1883–1899; 1900
Edward Mulcahy	Ministerial	Hobart	1891–1903; 1910–1919
Henry Murray^{[5]}	Liberal	Latrobe	1891–1900; 1902–1909
Herbert Nicholls^{[1]}	Liberal	Hobart	1900–1909
Robert Patterson	Independent/Ministerial	Hobart	1900–1904
William Propsting	Liberal	Hobart	1899–1905
Thomas Reibey	Liberal	Westbury	1874–1903
Frederick Shaw	Ministerial	Glamorgan	1899–1903
Robert Sadler	Independent/Liberal	Launceston	1900–1912; 1913–1922
John von Stieglitz	Ministerial	Evandale	1891–1903
David Storrer^{[6]}	Liberal	Launceston	1902–1903
Samuel Sutton^{[4]}	Liberal	Launceston	1891–1897; 1901–1903
Don Urquhart	Independent/Liberal	Zeehan	1894–1903; 1906–1909
Thomas Walduck	Independent/Liberal	George Town	1900–1903
Joseph Woollnough	Ministerial	Sorell	1893–1903

== Notes ==
^{1} On 17 April 1900, Liberal member for Hobart, Edward Miles, resigned. Liberal candidate Herbert Nicholls won the resulting by-election on 15 May 1900.
^{2} On 14 November 1900, Ministerial member for Hobart, John Bradley, died. Independent candidate Charles Hoggins won the resulting by-election on 5 December 1900.
^{3} On 29 March 1901, Liberal member for West Devon, Sir Edward Braddon, resigned to contest the inaugural federal election. Liberal candidate Sir John McCall won the resulting by-election on 30 April 1901.
^{4} In September 1901, Independent member for Launceston, Alexander Fowler, resigned. Liberal candidate Samuel Sutton won the resulting by-election on 4 October 1901.
^{5} On 3 April 1902, the Liberal member for Latrobe, William Aikenhead, died. Liberal candidate Henry Murray was elected unopposed on 19 April 1902.
^{6} In March 1902, Ministerial member for Launceston, William Hartnoll, resigned to contest a federal by-election following the death of Frederick Piesse. Liberal candidate David Storrer won the resulting by-election on 22 April 1902. Ironically, Storrer himself resigned the seat several months after the following election to defeat Hartnoll in Bass.
^{7} On 26 May 1902, the Liberal member for Selby, Frank Archer, died. At the resulting by-election on 11 June 1902, Liberal candidate Thomas Massey was elected unopposed.

== Sources ==
- Hughes, Colin A.; Graham, B. D. (1976). Voting for the South Australian, Western Australian and Tasmanian Lower Houses, 1890-1964. Canberra: Australian National University. ISBN 0-7081-1334-6.
- Parliament of Tasmania (2006). The Parliament of Tasmania from 1856
