= Members of the Tasmanian House of Assembly, 1897–1900 =

This is a list of members of the Tasmanian House of Assembly between the 1897 election and the 1900 election.

Party affiliations were relatively loose during the period, although a Liberal grouping had formed over the 1890s around Sir Edward Braddon, the Premier of Tasmania until 12 October 1899, and Andrew Inglis Clark. A separate grouping, generally described as Ministerial, supported Elliott Lewis, who was Premier for the final five months of the parliamentary term. As was common at such changes in Tasmanian politics, several Liberal MHAs affiliated with the new government by the time of the 1900 election.

The 1897 election was the first to use a limited version of the Hare-Clark system within Hobart and Launceston, which were given 6 and 4 seats respectively, while still using first past the post single-member constituencies elsewhere in the state. It was renewed and adjusted periodically until the 1909 election, when the entire State was redivided into five electorates using the Hare-Clark system.

Name	Party	District	Years in office
William Aikenhead	Ministerial/Liberal	Devonport/Latrobe^{[2]}	1898–1902
Frank Archer	Liberal	Selby	1893–1902
Jonathan Best^{[7]}	Ministerial	Deloraine	1894–1897; 1899–1912; 1913
Stafford Bird^{[M4]}	Independent/Ministerial	Franklin	1882–1903; 1904–1909
Sir Edward Braddon^{[M2]}	Liberal	West Devon	1879–1888; 1893–1901
John Bradley	Liberal/Ministerial	Hobart	1893–1900
Nicholas John Brown	Independent	Cumberland	1875–1903
William Brown	Independent/Liberal	Campbell Town	1882–1889; 1893–1903
William Burbury^{[7]}	Ministerial/Independent	Oatlands	1899–1903
Daniel Burke	Ministerial	Cressy	1893–1903
Norman Cameron^{[7]}	Ministerial	Deloraine	1893–1894; 1897–1899; 1912–1913; 1925–1928
Andrew Inglis Clark^{[1]}	Liberal	Hobart	1878–1882; 1887–1898
Matthew Clarke	Liberal	Launceston	1897–1900
Alfred Crisp	Liberal	Hobart	1886–1900
Edward Crowther	Liberal/Ministerial	Kingborough	1878–1912
John Davies	Independent/Ministerial	Fingal	1884–1913
Henry Dobson	Ministerial	Brighton	1891–1900
Henry Dumaresq	Liberal/Ministerial	Longford	1886–1903
John Evans	Independent	Kingborough	1897–1937
Alexander Fowler	Liberal/Independent	Launceston	1893; 1897–1901
Sir Philip Fysh^{[3]}	Liberal	Hobart	1873–1878; 1894–1898
James Gaffney^{[4]}	Liberal/Ministerial	Lyell	1899–1903
George Gilmore	Ministerial	George Town	1893–1900; 1903–1906
Charles Hall	Independent	Waratah	1897–1903
John Hamilton	Liberal/Ministerial	Glenorchy	1887–1903
William Hartnoll	Ministerial	Launceston	1884–1902
John Henry^{[2]}	Ministerial	Devonport	1891–1897
Charles Hoggins^{[1]}	Liberal	Hobart	1898–1900; 1900–1903; 1917–1919
George Leatham	Liberal/Ministerial	New Norfolk	1891–1903; 1906–1909
Elliott Lewis^{[M4]}	Ministerial	Richmond	1886–1903; 1909–1922
Charles Mackenzie	Ministerial	Wellington	1886–1909
William McWilliams	Liberal/Independent	Ringarooma	1893–1900
Edward Miles^{[M3]}^{[6]}	Liberal	Glamorgan	1883–1899; 1900
Edward Mulcahy^{[M4]}	Liberal	Hobart	1891–1903; 1910–1919
Henry Murray	Ministerial/Independent	Latrobe/Devonport^{[2]}	1891–1900; 1902–1909
William Page	Independent	Hobart	1897–1900
Alfred Pillinger^{[5]}	Liberal	Oatlands	1876–1899
William Propsting^{[3]}	Liberal	Hobart	1899–1905
Thomas Reibey	Liberal	Westbury	1874–1903
Frederick Shaw^{[8]}	Ministerial	Glamorgan	1899–1903
Ronald Smith	Liberal	Launceston	1897–1900
John von Stieglitz	Ministerial	Evandale	1891–1903
Don Urquhart^{[M1]}	Liberal/Independent	Montagu	1894–1903; 1906–1909
Joseph Woollnough	Ministerial	Sorell	1893–1903

== Notes ==
^{1} On 17 June 1898, Liberal member Andrew Inglis Clark, one of the six members representing Hobart, resigned. Liberal candidate Charles Hoggins won the resulting by-election on 17 June 1898 against two former members, George Hiddlestone and Windle St Hill.
^{2} In June 1898, the Ministerial member for Devonport, John Henry, resigned. Ministerial candidate William Aikenhead won the resulting by-election on 21 June 1898; however, the election was declared void. In October 1898, the Ministerial member for the neighbouring seat of Latrobe, Henry Murray, resigned to contest the resulting by-election (held on 25 October 1898), whilst Aikenhead contested the now-vacant seat of Latrobe at a by-election on 15 October 1898. Both were successful.
^{3} On 30 December 1898, Liberal member Sir Philip Fysh, one of the six members representing Hobart, resigned. Liberal candidate William Propsting won the resulting by-election on 16 February 1899.
^{4} In 1899, a new electoral district, Lyell, was created in western Tasmania. Liberal candidate James Gaffney won the resulting by-election on 10 April 1899. The by-election was notable for being the first to be contested by the Labor Party in Tasmania—its candidate, R. Matthews, gained 40% of the votes.
^{5} On 6 May 1899, the Liberal member for Oatlands and the Minister for Lands and Works, Alfred Pillinger, died. Ministerial candidate William Burbury was elected unopposed on 19 May 1899, endangering the chances of the Liberal government's chances of surviving a motion of no confidence.
^{6} On 2 October 1899, Edward Miles, the Liberal member for Glamorgan and Minister for Lands and Works, was forced to resign from the Ministry and from Parliament following allegations of corruption and mismanagement in his portfolio by a Select Committee. His resignation triggered the fall of the government four days later in a motion of no confidence. Ministerial candidate Frederick Shaw won the resulting by-election on 25 October 1899.
^{7} On 21 October 1899, Norman Cameron, the Ministerial member for Deloraine, resigned. Ministerial candidate Jonathan Best won the resulting by-election on 10 November 1899.

Ministerial by-elections

^{M1} On 23 October 1897, Don Urquhart, the member for Montagu, was appointed Attorney-General in the Braddon Ministry. He was returned unopposed at the resulting ministerial by-election on 19 November 1897.
^{M2} On 1 January 1899, Premier Sir Edward Braddon replaced the outgoing minister Sir Philip Fysh as Colonial Treasurer and Postmaster-General. He was returned unopposed at the resulting ministerial by-election on 11 February 1899.
^{M3} On 10 May 1899, Edward Miles was appointed to fill the vacancy in the Ministry caused by Pillinger's death, and was returned unopposed at the resulting ministerial by-election on 19 May 1899.
^{M4} On 12 October 1899, following the fall of the Braddon government, Elliott Lewis was invited to form a government. At the resulting ministerial by-elections, two were returned unopposed on 20 October 1899, while the remaining member, Edward Mulcahy, won his seat against two opponents on 25 October 1899.

== Sources ==
- Hughes, Colin A.; Graham, B. D. (1976). Voting for the South Australian, Western Australian and Tasmanian Lower Houses, 1890-1964. Canberra: Australian National University. ISBN 0-7081-1334-6.
- Newman, Terry (1994). Representation of the Tasmanian People. Tasmanian Parliamentary Library. ISBN 0-7246-4147-5.
- Parliament of Tasmania (2006). The Parliament of Tasmania from 1856
