= Giblin =

Giblin is a surname. Notable people with the surname include:

- Anne E. Giblin, marine biologist
- fr:Béatrice Giblin (born 1947), French scholar
- Belinda Giblin (born 1950), Australian actress
- Edmund Giblin (1923–2000), English footballer
- Irene M. Giblin (1888–1974), American ragtime musician
- John Giblin, British double bassist and bass guitarist
- Lyndhurst Giblin (1872–1951), Australian statistician and economist
- Paul Giblin, American investigative journalist
- Peter Giblin (born 1943), English mathematician
- Robert Giblin (1952–2025), American football player
- Ronald Worthy Giblin (1863–1936), Australian surveyor and historian
- Sally Ann Giblin (born 1972), English psychotherapist
- Thomas P. Giblin (born 1947), US Democratic Party politician
- Vincent Giblin (1817–1884), Australian cricket player and banker
- William Giblin (1840–1887), Premier of Tasmania, Australia

== See also ==
- Giblin family pioneering family of Hobart, Tasmania, Australia
- Giblin, Illinois, unincorporated community in Champaign County, Illinois, US
- 7728 Giblin, asteroid.
