= Electoral district of Montagu =

Former Tasmanian House of Assembly electoral district

The Electoral district of Montagu was a single-member electoral district of the Tasmanian House of Assembly. It covered the West Coast region of Tasmania and its main centre of population was the town of Zeehan.

The seat was created out of part of the seat of Cumberland in a redistribution intended to be carried out for the state election, held on 19 December 1893. However, the redistribution had not yet secured royal assent at the time of the election, and Zeehan solicitor Don Urquhart won the Cumberland poll against the incumbent member, Nicholas John Brown. This ended up in the Supreme Court of Tasmania, which voided the election result. When the district of Montagu was proclaimed, a by-election was called for 2 March 1894 which was won by Urquhart, who went on to be the only member for the seat. It was abolished at the 1900 election and replaced with the seats of Lyell, covering the wider West Coast area, and Zeehan, covering only the town. Urquhart successfully transferred to the Zeehan seat.

== Members for Montagu ==
Member	Term
Don Urquhart	1894–1900
