= David Scott (Tasmanian politician) =

Australian politician

Member of the Tasmanian House of Assembly for South Launceston
- In office 26 July 1886 – May 1891 Serving with William Hartnoll
- Preceded by: William Hartnoll
- Succeeded by: Samuel Sutton

Member of the Tasmanian House of Assembly for North Launceston
- In office 9 September 1892 – 11 January 1893 Serving with Peter Barrett
- Preceded by: Henry Lette
- Succeeded by: Alexander Fowler

Personal details
- Born: 1837 Broughty Ferry, Scotland
- Died: 11 January 1893 (aged 55–56) Launceston, Tasmania

David Scott (1837 – 11 January 1893) was an Australian politician.

Scott was born in Broughty Ferry in Scotland in 1837. In 1886 he was elected to the Tasmanian House of Assembly, representing the seat of South Launceston. He served until his defeat in 1891. He returned to Parliament in September 1892 after winning a by-election for North Launceston, but died four months later in January 1893.

Tasmanian House of Assembly
Preceded by William Hartnoll	Member for South Launceston; 1886–1891; Served alongside: William Hartnoll	Succeeded by Samuel Sutton
Preceded by Henry Lette	Member for North Launceston; 1892–1893; Served alongside: Peter Barrett	Succeeded by Alexander Fowler
