= Arthur Young (Australian politician) =

Australian politician

Member of the Tasmanian House of Assembly for East Devon
- In office 26 July 1886 – May 1891 Serving with James Dooley
- Preceded by: James Dooley
- Succeeded by: John Henry/Henry Murray

Personal details
- Born: 1816 Aberdeenshire, Scotland
- Died: 27 March 1906 (aged 89–90) Devonport, Tasmania

Arthur Young (1816 – 27 March 1906) was an Australian politician.

Young was born in Aberdeenshire in 1816. In 1886 he was elected to the Tasmanian House of Assembly, representing the seat of East Devon. He served until 1891. He died in 1906 in Devonport.

Tasmanian House of Assembly
| Preceded by James Dooley | Member for East Devon; 1886–1891; Served alongside: James Dooley | Succeeded by John Henry; Henry Murray |
