= Allan MacDonald (Tasmanian politician) =

Australian politician

Member of the Tasmanian House of Assembly for North Launceston
- In office 19 December 1893 – January 1897 Serving with Peter Barrett
- Preceded by: Alexander Fowler
- Succeeded by: Seat abolished

Personal details
- Born: 1853 Adelaide, South Australia
- Died: 8 December 1898 (aged 44–45) Launceston, Tasmania

Allan MacDonald (1853 – 8 December 1898) was an Australian politician.

MacDonald was born in Adelaide in 1853. In 1893 he was elected to the Tasmanian House of Assembly, representing the seat of North Launceston. He served until his defeat in 1897. He died in 1898 in Launceston.

Tasmanian House of Assembly
Preceded by Alexander Fowler	Member for North Launceston; 1893–1897; Served alongside: Peter Barrett	Abolished
