= Alfred Crisp =

Australian politician

Member of the Tasmanian House of Assembly for North Hobart
- In office 26 July 1886 – 20 January 1897
- Preceded by: George Salier
- Succeeded by: Seat abolished

Member of the Tasmanian House of Assembly for Hobart
- In office 20 January 1897 – March 1900
- Preceded by: New seat
- Succeeded by: William Guesdon/Edward Miles/Robert Patterson

Personal details
- Born: Alfred Crisp; 19 May 1843 Hobart, Van Diemen's Land
- Died: 29 May 1917 (aged 74) Hobart, Tasmania

Alfred Crisp (19 May 1843 – 29 May 1917) was an Australian politician.

Crisp was born in Hobart in Tasmania in 1843. In 1886 he was elected to the Tasmanian House of Assembly, representing the seat of North Hobart. In 1897 he was elected for the multi-member Hobart constituency, but he was defeated in 1900. He died in 1917 in Hobart.

Tasmanian House of Assembly
Preceded by George Salier	Member for North Hobart; 1886–1897	Abolished
New seat	Member for Hobart; 1897–1900	Succeeded by William Guesdon; Edward Miles; Robert Patterson
