= Edward Giblin =

Australian politician

Dr Edward Giblin
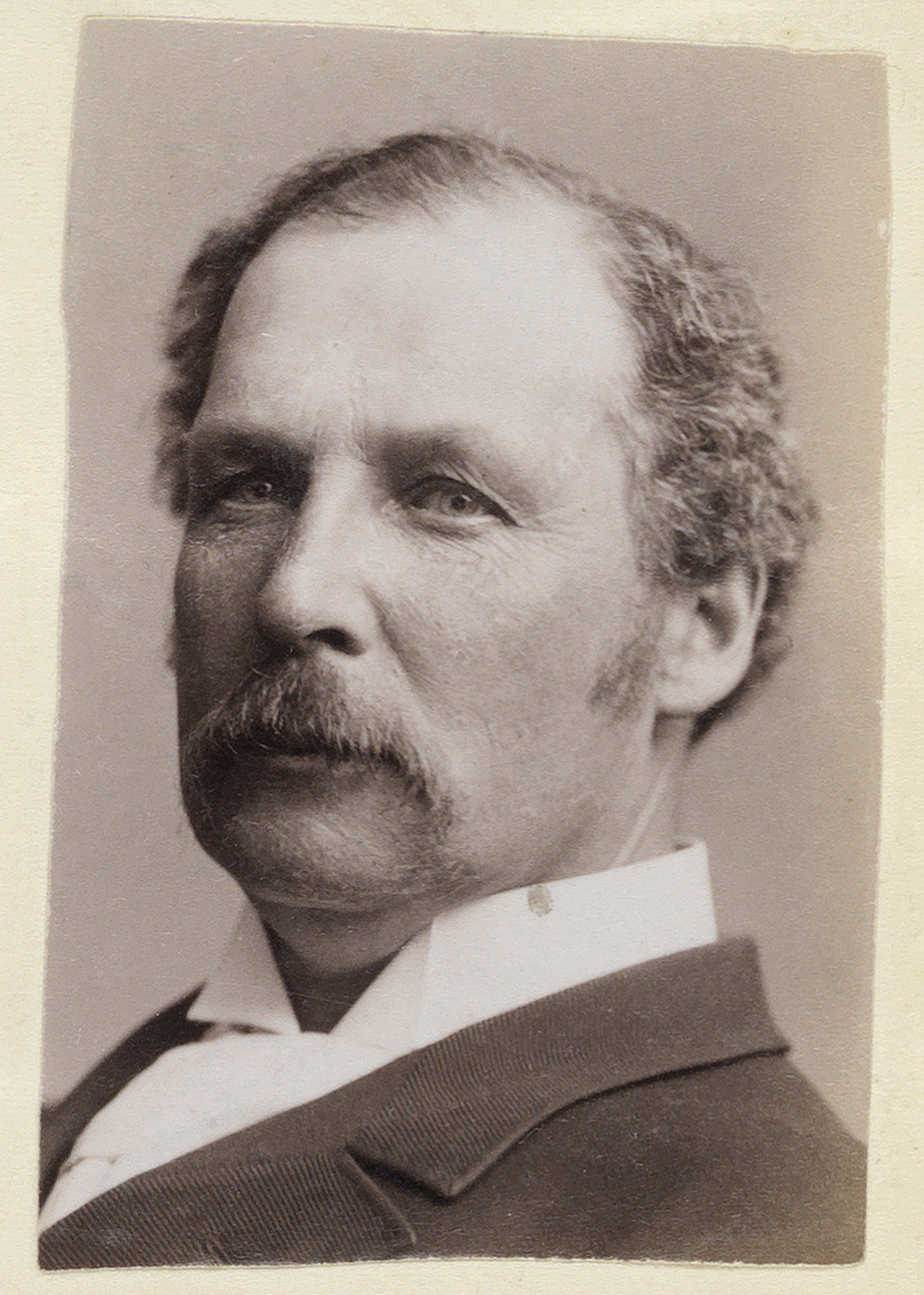
- Giblin c. 1894

Member of the Tasmanian House of Assembly for South Hobart
- In office 22 May 1891 – 19 December 1893 Serving with Andrew Inglis Clark
- Preceded by: William Belbin
- Succeeded by: John Bradley

Personal details
- Born: Edward Owen Giblin; 23 November 1849 Claremont, Van Diemen's Land
- Died: 27 December 1895 (aged 46) Launceston, Tasmania
- Relations: William Giblin (uncle)
- Education: University of Glasgow
- Occupation: Doctor

Edward Owen Giblin MRCS (23 November 1849 – 27 December 1895) was an Australian medical doctor and politician.

Giblin was born in Claremont in Tasmania in 1849. He was a nephew of Tasmanian premier William Giblin and a member of the Giblin family. He graduated MBBS from the University of Glasgow in 1876 and proceeded to MD in 1878. After returning to Tasmania he was an honorary medical officer at Hobart General Hospital, a member of the court of medical examiners, and medical officer of health for the Hobart Corporation. He also served on the council of the University of Tasmania and was surgeon-major in the Tasmanian Rifle Regiment.

In 1891 Giblin was elected to the Tasmanian House of Assembly, representing the seat of South Hobart. He served until his defeat in 1893. He died in Launceston of sunstroke on 27 December 1895, aged 46.

Tasmanian House of Assembly
Preceded by William Belbin	Member for South Hobart; 1891–1893; Served alongside: Andrew Inglis Clark	Succeeded by John Bradley
