= James Ogden =

Australian politician

The Honourable James Ogden
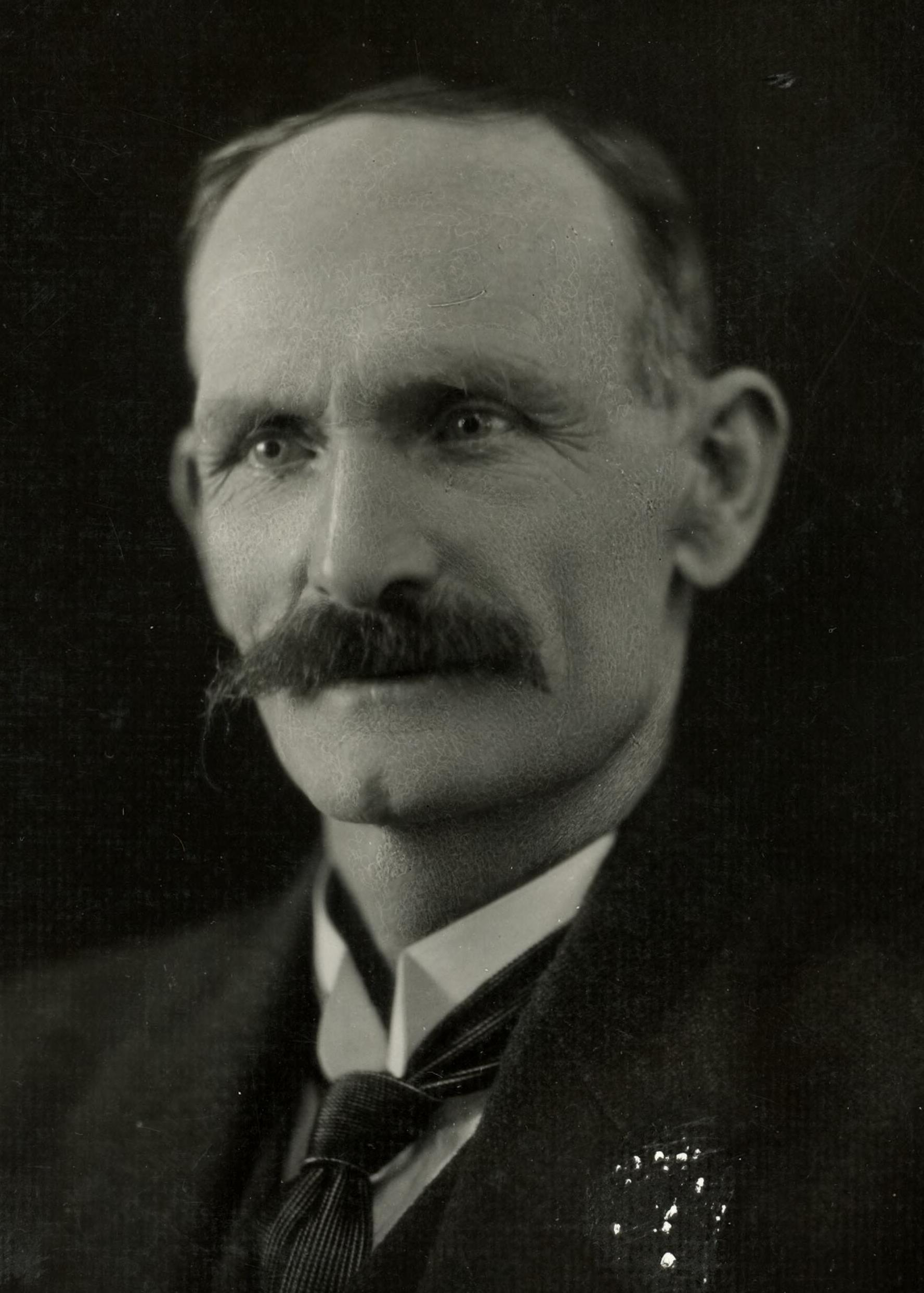

Senator for Tasmania
- In office 1 July 1923 – 5 February 1932
- Preceded by: John Earle
- Succeeded by: Charles Grant

Member of the Tasmanian House of Assembly for Darwin
- In office 1909–1922
- Preceded by: seat created
- Succeeded by: Philip Kelly

Member of the Tasmanian House of Assembly for Zeehan
- In office 1906–1909
- Preceded by: William Lamerton
- Succeeded by: seat abolished

Personal details
- Born: 8 March 1868 Durdidwarrah, Victoria, Australia
- Died: 5 February 1932 (aged 63) Moonah, Tasmania, Australia
- Party: Labor (to 1925); Independent (1925–26); Nationalist (1926–31); UAP (1931–32)

James Ernest Ogden (8 March 1868 – 5 February 1932) was an Australian politician who was elected to the Tasmanian House of Assembly and the Australian Senate.

== Early life ==
Ogden was born at Durdidwarrah, near Geelong, Victoria and educated at Steiglitz State School until he was 14 and then worked at a variety of jobs in different parts of Australia. From 1896 until 1906 he was a prospector and miner on the west-coast of Tasmania. He married Emma Etta Colls in 1897. He was later president of the Tasmanian branch of the Amalgamated Miners' Association.

== State politics ==
Ogden was elected to the Tasmanian House of Assembly seat of Zeehan for the Labor Party at the 1906 election. As a result of its abolition he stood for and won one of the seats of Darwin at the 1909 election. In October 1909, he was appointed treasurer in John Earle's minority Labor government, but it lasted only a week. In 1914, Earle returned to power and Ogden became chief secretary and minister for mines and labour until Labor's defeat in April 1916.

Ogden was elected state ALP leader in October 1919, when Joseph Lyons resigned in order to stand for federal parliament. Lyons' candidacy was unsuccessful, and he resumed the state leadership in August 1920.

== Federal politics ==
Ogden resigned from the House of Assembly to contest the 1922 election for the Senate and won, holding his seat until his death. In 1925, he supported the Bruce-Page's government's legislation on navigation and immigration, because he considered that the militant Seamen's Union—which it affected—was harmful to Tasmania, an island state. As a result, he was expelled by the Tasmanian branch of the Labor Party, and subsequently sat as an independent. At the 1928 election, he won re-election as a Nationalist and he was appointed honorary minister and assistant minister for industry in the third Bruce Ministry from November 1928, until its defeat at the October 1929 election. He died in the Hobart suburb of Moonah.
