= William Sidebottom (Australian politician) =

Australian politician

Member of the Tasmanian House of Assembly for Selby
- In office 25 February 1885 – December 1893
- Preceded by: Charles Grubb
- Succeeded by: Frank Archer

Personal details
- Born: 5 February 1836 Evandale, Van Dieken's Land
- Died: 28 June 1932 (aged 96) Launceston, Tasmania

William Sidebottom (5 February 1836 – 28 June 1932) was an Australian politician.

Sidebottom was born in Evandale in Tasmania in 1836. In 1885 he was elected to the Tasmanian House of Assembly, representing the seat of Selby. He served until 1893. He died in 1932 in Launceston.

Tasmanian House of Assembly
Preceded by Charles Grubb	Member for Selby; 1885–1893	Succeeded by Frank Archer
