= John Stokell Dodds =

Australian politician

Sir John Stokell Dodds KCMG (1848 – 23 June 1914) was an Australian politician and Chief Justice of Tasmania.

== Early life ==
Dodds was born in Durham, England, the son of William and Annie (née Shute) Dodds. The family moved to Hobart, Tasmania, arriving in 1853. His father died soon afterwards and Dodds was educated in Hobart.

== Sources ==
- G. H. Crawford, 'Dodds, Sir John Stokell (1848–1914)', Australian Dictionary of Biography, Volume 4, MUP, 1972, pp. 80–81.
- Serle, Percival (1949). "Dodds, John Stokell". Dictionary of Australian Biography. Sydney: Angus & Robertson.

Legal offices
Preceded by Sir William Dobson	Chief Justice of Tasmania; 1898-1914	Succeeded by Sir Herbert Nicholls
Tasmanian House of Assembly
Preceded by Philip Fysh	Member for East Hobart; 1878–1886	Abolished
Preceded by William Belbin	Member for South Hobart; 1886–1887; Served alongside: William Belbin	Succeeded by Andrew Inglis Clark
