= Charles Featherstone =

Australian politician

Member of the Tasmanian House of Assembly for Sorell
- In office 11 February 1889 – March 1893
- Preceded by: James Gray
- Succeeded by: Joseph Woollnough

Personal details
- Born: Charles Edwin Featherstone; 18 December 1852 Hobart, Tasmania
- Died: unknown

Charles Edwin Featherstone (born 18 December 1852, date of death unknown) was an Australian politician.

Featherstone was born in Hobart in Van Diemen's Land in 1852. In 1889 he was elected to the Tasmanian House of Assembly, representing the seat of Sorell. He served until his disqualification due to bankruptcy in 1893. His date of death is unknown.

Tasmanian House of Assembly
Preceded by James Gray	Member for Sorell; 1889–1893	Succeeded by Joseph Woollnough
