= John Gibson (Australian politician) =

Australian politician

John Blackler Gibson (1857 - 5 December 1941) was an Australian politician. He was a member of the Tasmanian House of Assembly from 1903 to 1906, representing the electorate of North Esk.

Gibson was born at Evandale and was educated at Launceston. He was the grandson of prominent pastoralist and former convict David Gibson, and inherited the family's (now-historic) "Pleasant Banks" estate. He became, as with much of his family, a prominent sheepbreeder. Gibson was a long-serving member of the Evandale Municipal Council and was chairman of the local Licensing Bench, Warden of the local Police Court, and secretary of the local agricultural show at the time of his election.

Gibson was elected to the House of Assembly at the 1903 election, defeating incumbent MPs Thomas Massey and John Charles von Steiglitz, whose seats had been amalgamated in a redistribution. He supported government retrenchment as opposed to taxation, the reduction in size of both Houses of Parliament and the ministry, abolishing the position of Agent-General and "[doing] without" a Governor when that role became vacant. He supported the platform of the Reform League with "a few exceptions". He lost his seat to Richard McKenzie at the 1906 election. He contested the Tasmanian Legislative Council seat of Westmorland in 1907, but was unsuccessful.

In the 1920s, Gibson purchased Winmarleigh at Taroona and resided there. He later sold the property, and was residing in Hobart at the time of his death. He died in Hobart in December 1941 and was buried at Cornelian Bay Cemetery.
