= William Page (politician) =

Australian politician

The Hon. William Humphrey Page
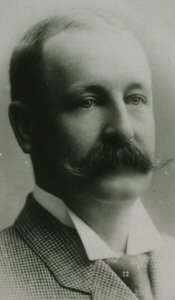
- William Humphrey Page as Member for Hobart.

Member of the Tasmanian House of Assembly for Hobart
- In office 20 January 1897 – 9 March 1900
- Preceded by: New seat
- Succeeded by: William Guesdon/Edward Miles/Robert Patterson

Personal details
- Born: William Humphrey Page; 1848 Ireland
- Died: 26 October 1925 (aged 76–77) Bruges, Belgium
- Occupation: Politician
- Profession: Barrister

William Humphrey Page (1848 – 26 October 1925) was an Irish-born Indian Judge and Australian politician.

Page was born in 1848. Following legal training in London, he served as a justice at the Bombay High Court. In 1897 he was elected to the Tasmanian House of Assembly, representing the seat of Hobart. He served until his defeat in 1900.

He died in 1925 in Bruges, Belgium, having survived the occupation during World War One. His son was the noted legal writer and prison reformer Sir Leo Page.

Tasmanian House of Assembly
New seat	Member for Hobart; 1897–1900	Succeeded by William Guesdon; Edward Miles; Robert Patterson
