= Samuel Sutton (disambiguation) =

Samuel Sutton (1760–1832) was a rear-admiral of the Royal Navy.

Samuel Sutton may also refer to:

- Samuel Sutton (American politician) (c. 1795–1878), American politician from Maryland
- Samuel Sutton (Australian politician) (1836–1906), Australian politician from Tasmania
