= Giblin family =

The Giblin family of Tasmania was an influential family in the early days of the colony of Tasmania, then named Van Diemen's Land.

== Origin ==
Robert Wilkins Giblin (17 May 1780 – 1 September 1845) was an English emigrant who arrived in Hobart Town, Van Diemen's Land aboard the Sir Charles Forbes in 1827 with his wife and eight children. He had run a school in England which failed in the financial crash of a few years before, and would run a school near Hobart in the 1830s and early 1840s before being declared insolvent. Some of his descendants and their spouses occupied influential positions in the young colony.

== Notable family members ==
- Vincent Wanostrocht Giblin (13 November 1817 – 15 May 1884), a son of Robert Wilkins Giblin; he was a cricketer and manager of the bank of Victoria, then Australian Joint Stock Bank, Sydney. On 13 January 1841, he married Jane Isabel (c. 1819 – 29 May 1905), daughter of G. W. Evans, Deputy Surveyor-General of Van Diemen's Land. His daughter, Jessie Isabel (1843 – 1915), married Charles Alfred Robey, son of politician and businessman Ralph Meyer Robey.
- Charlotte Giblin (1813 – 3 January 1879), daughter of Robert Wilkins Giblin, married Ebenezer Shoobridge (1820–1901); their children were William Ebenezer Shoobridge (1846–1940), Robert Wilkins Giblin Shoobridge (1847–1936), and Louis Manton Shoobridge (1851–1939). The three brothers were agriculturalists and industrial innovators; William and Louis were both involved in politics.
- Dr. Edward Owen Giblin (23 November 1849 – 27 December 1895), a grandson of Robert Wilkins Giblin; he was a medical doctor and politician, and married Edith Harriett Westbrook on 6 August 1879
- Mary Giblin (1886 – 1983), a great-granddaughter of Robert Wilkins Giblin, married painter Lucien Dechaineux (15 July 1869 – 4 April 1957) on 21 December 1909; by his first marriage, Lucien was father of Emile Dechaineux (3 October 1902 – 1944) killed in WWII in command of HMAS Australia.
- Ronald Worthy Giblin (3 January 1863 – 13 March 1936), a grandson of Robert Wilkins Giblin; he was a land surveyor and historian of Tasmania.
- William Robert Giblin (4 November 1840 – 17 January 1887), a grandson of Robert Wilkins Giblin; he was Premier of Tasmania in 1878, puisne judge of the Supreme Court of Tasmania. On 5 January 1865, he married Emmely Jean (c. 1841 – 2 January 1926), eldest daughter of John Perkins, M.H.A.; Their son, Lyndhurst Falkiner Giblin DSO, MC (29 November 1872 – 1 March 1951), was a political economist.

== Bibliography ==
- William Coleman, Selwyn Cornish, Alf Hagger Giblin's Platoon: The Trials and Triumph of the Economist in Australian Public Life ANU Press. ISBN 978-1920942496. This book includes many references to L. F. Giblin's family and antecedents.
- Wilfrid W. Giblin Kith and kin : some notes on our branch of the family privately pub. Hobart 1945
- Lloyd Ashton Giblin Tracing my Giblin ancestors pub. Lagpress, Sandy Bay (Tas.) c. 1982
