= Georgina Temperley =

- Born: Frances Mary Lily Georgina Temperley Bourke; 1880; Adelaide, South Australia, Australia
- Died: 19 August 1936 (aged 55–56); Melbourne, Victoria, Australia
- Education: Bachelor of Medicine, Bachelor of Surgery
- Alma mater: University of Melbourne
- Occupation: Medical doctor

Georgina Temperley, BA MB BS, née Bourke (1880 – 19 August 1936) was an Australian medical doctor, remembered as the founder of One Woman, One Recruit, a patriotic organisation in Victoria during the Great War of 1914–1918.

== History ==
Temperley was born Frances Mary Lily Georgina Temperley Bourke in Adelaide, daughter of Francis Bourke and his wife Elizabeth Mary Bourke, née Lette, daughter of Henry Elmes Lette, cricketer and Tasmanian MHA. Her mother, by this time known as Lily Bourke, married again, to George Harrisson of Jericho, Tasmania on 28 June 1890.

She studied teaching at the Adelaide Teachers' College, and as Georgina Temperley Harrisson was employed as a pupil teacher at Burra in 1896. Her first posting was to Port Wakefield in 1901; she resigned from the Norwood school in 1902.

She married William Charlton Hubble in Warwick, Queensland in 1903; they had twins and later separated and divorced. She never remarried but began calling herself Georgina Temperley. She had begun a course in medicine sometime around 1914, but as Australia became enmeshed in the Great War she put her ambitions on hold and took up nursing. She became in 1917 the first female organiser of the Victorian State Recruiting Committee. Enthusiasm for the war had waned, the 1916 conscription referendum had failed, and more volunteers were needed to relieve the men at the Front, and replace the casualties. With Mrs C. B. Moore (died 25 February 1931) of the Australian Women's Association as secretary, she founded "One Woman, One Recruit League" to encourage women to induce the men in their lives to volunteer for military service, with the slogan "their womanhood to appeal to his manhood". A year later the League was able to claim 200 volunteers due to their efforts and was quietly dissolved.

She graduated in medicine from Melbourne University in 1923. She was Resident Medical Officer of the Wallsend Hospital, Newcastle for some time, and of Lithgow Hospital until early 1935. Her last appointment was to the Hobart General Hospital.

== Personal ==
Temperley married William Charlton Hubble (1880 – 17 February 1949) in 1903; they divorced 1922.

Hubble, who was involved in the business side of newspapers, married again, to Bertha Rossi Ashton in 1923. She was the daughter of Julian Ashton.

Temperley was the mother of twins: George Temperley Charlton "Tom" Hubble (8 December 1903 – 13 June 1960), painter and advertising agent, and Nell Mary Lette Hubble (8 December 1903 – 14 October 1931), who also worked in advertising before becoming a nurse; she died in Dunedin, New Zealand.

She was a sister of the champion rower Thomas Harrison Bourke (2 February 1881 – 3 February 1948).
