= Electoral district of North Launceston =

Former Tasmanian electoral district

The electoral district of North Launceston, sometimes referred to as Launceston North, was an electoral district of the Tasmanian House of Assembly created in 2008. It was based in Tasmania's second city, Launceston, and the surrounding rural area.

The seat was created as a single-member seat ahead of the 1871 election following the dissolution of the multi-member Launceston seat. In 1886, it became a two-member seat, and at the 1897 election, it was abolished when the Launceston seat was recreated under a trial of the Hare-Clark model.

The seat was then recreated as a single-member seat at the 1903 election and was abolished when the Tasmanian parliament adopted the Hare-Clark electoral model for the entire state in 1909.

== Members for North Launceston ==
Single member: 1871–1886

Member	Term
Charles Rocher	1871–1872
James Cox	1872–1874
Frederick Innes	1874–1877
Henry Lette	1877–1886

Two member: 1886–1897

Member 1	Term	Member 2	Term
Henry Lette	1886–1892	Peter Barrett	1886–1897
David Scott	1892–1893	Peter Barrett	1886–1897
Alexander Fowler	1893	Peter Barrett	1886–1897
Allan MacDonald	1893–1897	Peter Barrett	1886–1897

Second incarnation: 1903–1909

Member	Party	Term
William Batchelor	Opposition	1903–1906
Charles Howroyd	Labor	1906–1909
