= James Gray (Australian politician) =

Australian politician

Member of the Tasmanian House of Assembly for West Hobart
- In office 31 August 1872 – April 1877
- Preceded by: John Balfe
- Succeeded by: John Balfe

Member of the Tasmanian House of Assembly for Sorell
- In office 30 May 1882 – 21 January 1889
- Preceded by: James Gunn
- Succeeded by: Charles Featherstone

Personal details
- Born: 1820 Ballybay, County Monaghan
- Died: 21 January 1889 (aged 68–69) Hobart, Tasmania

James Gray (1820 – 21 January 1889) was an Australian politician.

Gray was born in Ballybay in County Monaghan in 1820. In 1843 he was found guilty of subornation to perjury and transported to Tasmania, where he arrived in 1844. He received his ticket of leave in 1847 and became a free man in 1853. In 1872 he was elected to the Tasmanian House of Assembly, representing the seat of West Hobart. He served until 1877. He later represented Sorell from 1882 until his death in 1889.

Tasmanian House of Assembly
Preceded by John Balfe	Member for West Hobart; 1872–1877	Succeeded by John Balfe
Preceded by James Gunn	Member for Sorell; 1882–1889	Succeeded by Charles Featherstone
