= Henry Dumbleton =

Australian politician

Henry Arthur Dumbleton (16 November 1857 – 17 March 1930) was an Australian politician.

He was born in Shimla, India. In 1903 he was elected to the Tasmanian House of Assembly as the member for Devonport. He served until his defeat in 1906. Dumbleton died in 1930 in Devonport.
