= William Guesdon =

Australian politician

Member of the Tasmanian House of Assembly for Central Hobart
- In office 25 May 1882 – July 1886
- Preceded by: David Lewis
- Succeeded by: Seat abolished

Member of the Tasmanian House of Assembly for Hobart
- In office 9 March 1900 – 2 April 1903
- Preceded by: Alfred Crisp/Charles Hoggins/William Page
- Succeeded by: Seat abolished

Personal details
- Born: William Algernon Guesdon; 6 September 1848 Hobart, Tasmania
- Died: 21 December 1926 (aged 78) Hobart, Tasmania
- Spouse(s): Elizabeth Webb, Grace Lilian Eady
- Children: 13
- Education: Horton College
- Occupation: auctioneer, estate and commission agent

William Algernon Guesdon (6 September 1848 – 21 December 1926) JP, MLA, was an Australian businessman, politician and racing identity.

== Life and career ==
He was born in Hobart on 6 December 1848. His father was William Andrew Guesdon (1816-1891), a successful Hobart merchant. His mother was Esther Rebecca Dowling (1827-1865).

He was educated at Horton College and Hobart High School. After finishing his education he left for the mainland and spent some time in Melbourne. He then returned to Hobart and joined his father's firm of W.A. Guesdon & Co. On his father's death he became a principal of Guesdon & Westbrook, a prominent firm of auctioneers in Hobart. He later became a land and estate agent.

He married Elizabeth Webb in Hobart on 9 August 1871 and the couple had seven children. They divorced in 1887. He married Grace Lilian Eady 16 May 1895 and the couple had six children, three daughters and three sons.

Guesdon had an interest in the turf. He was a founder member of the Tasmanian Racing Club in 1875. His horse Darriwell won the Melbourne Cup in 1879. The following year he won the VRC Derby with Darabin.

== Politics ==
In 1882 he was elected to the Tasmanian House of Assembly, representing the seat of Central Hobart. His seat was abolished in 1886. He returned to the House in 1900 as one of the members for Hobart, but he was defeated running for East Hobart in 1903.

Guesdon died at his home, Cananore, 79 Davey St, Hobart, on 26 December 1926. He was survived by his wife and five of their six children. One of his daughters, Florence, married the sportsman, lawyer and politician, Charles Eady.

Tasmanian House of Assembly
Preceded by David Lewis	Member for Central Hobart; 1882–1886	Seat abolished
Preceded by Alfred Crisp; Charles Hoggins; William Page	Member for Hobart; 1900–1903	Seat abolished
