= John Bradley (Australian politician) =

Australian politician (1844–1900)

Member of the Tasmanian House of Assembly for South Hobart
- In office 19 December 1893 – 20 January 1897 Serving with Andrew Inglis Clark
- Preceded by: Edward Giblin
- Succeeded by: Seat abolished

Member of the Tasmanian House of Assembly for Hobart
- In office 20 January 1897 – 14 November 1900
- Preceded by: New seat
- Succeeded by: Charles Hoggins

Personal details
- Born: John Bradley; 1844 Dundee, Scotland
- Died: 14 November 1900 (aged 55–56) Hobart, Tasmania

John Bradley (1844 – 14 November 1900) was an Australian politician.

Bradley was born in Dundee in Scotland in 1844 and arrived in Australia in 1855. In 1893 he was elected to the Tasmanian House of Assembly, representing the seat of South Hobart. In 1897 he was elected for the new multi-member seat of Hobart He served until his death in Hobart in 1900.

Tasmanian House of Assembly
Preceded by Edward Giblin	Member for South Hobart; 1893–1897; Served alongside: Andrew Inglis Clark	Seat abolished
New title	Member for Hobart; 1897–1900	Succeeded by Charles Hoggins
