= John Falkiner =

Australian politician

Member of the Tasmanian House of Assembly for Morven
- In office 23 May 1882 – 26 July 1886
- Preceded by: James Cox
- Succeeded by: Seat abolished

Member of the Tasmanian House of Assembly for Evandale
- In office 26 July 1886 – May 1891
- Preceded by: New seat
- Succeeded by: John von Stieglitz

Personal details
- Born: John William Falkiner; 16 May 1848 Epping Forest, Tasmania
- Died: 14 November 1927 (aged 79) Longford, Tasmania

John William Falkiner (16 May 1848 – 14 November 1927) was an Australian politician.

Falkiner was born in Epping Forest in Tasmania in 1848. In 1882 he was elected to the Tasmanian House of Assembly, representing the seat of Morven. In 1886 his seat was replaced by Evandale, which he represented until his defeat in 1891. He died in 1927 in Longford.

Tasmanian House of Assembly
Preceded by James Cox	Member for Morven; 1882–1886	Abolished
New seat	Member for Evandale; 1886–1891	Succeeded by John von Stieglitz
