= Electoral district of South Hobart =

Former electoral district of Tasmania

The electoral district of South Hobart, sometimes referred to as Hobart South, was an electoral district of the Tasmanian House of Assembly. It was based in Tasmania's capital city, Hobart.

The seat was created as a single-member seat ahead of the 1871 election following the dissolution of the multi-member Hobart Town seat. In 1886, it became a two-member seat, and at the 1897 election, it was abolished when the seat of Hobart was created under a trial of the Hare-Clark model.

The seat was then recreated as a single-member seat at the 1903 election and was abolished when the Tasmanian parliament adopted the Hare-Clark electoral model for the entire state in 1909.

== Members for South Hobart ==
First incarnation: 1871–1897

| Member 1 | Term | Member 2 | Term |
|---|---|---|---|
| William Belbin | 1871–1886 | | |
| John Stokell Dodds | 1886–1887 | William Belbin | 1886–1891 |
| Andrew Inglis Clark | 1887–1897 | William Belbin | 1886–1891 |
| Andrew Inglis Clark | 1887–1897 | Edward Giblin | 1891–1893 |
| Andrew Inglis Clark | 1887–1897 | John Bradley | 1893–1897 |

Second incarnation: 1903–1909

| Member | Party | Term |
|---|---|---|
| Robert Patterson | Opposition | 1903–1904 |
| Stafford Bird | Ministerial | 1906–1909 |
