= Electoral district of Zeehan =

Former electoral district of the Tasmanian House of Assembly

- Created: 1856
- Abolished: 1909
- Namesake: Zeehan, Tasmania

The Electoral district of Zeehan was a single-member electoral district of the Tasmanian House of Assembly. It was based in the mining town of Zeehan in the West Coast region of Tasmania.

The seat was created in a redistribution ahead of the 1900 election out of Lyell, and was abolished when the Tasmanian parliament adopted the Hare–Clark electoral system in 1909. Its final member, James Ogden, successfully stood for the multi-member seat of Darwin (now known as Braddon) and retained political office for 13 years.

== Members for Zeehan ==
Member	Party	Term
Don Urquhart	Free Trade Party	1900–1903
William Lamerton	Labour	1903–1905
William Lamerton	Ind. Labour	1905–1906
James Ogden	Labour	1906–1909
