= Charles Grubb =

Australian politician

Member of the Tasmanian House of Assembly for Selby
- In office 23 May 1882 – February 1885
- Preceded by: Thomas Just
- Succeeded by: William Sidebottom

Personal details
- Born: Charles Beaumont Barnes Grubb; 28 June 1852 West Tamar, Van Diemen's Land
- Died: 20 May 1930 (aged 77) Launceston, Tasmania

Charles Beaumont Barnes Grubb (28 June 1852 – 20 May 1930) was an Australian politician.

== Early life ==
Grubb was born in 1852 at Newnham Hall, Janefield in the West Tamar region of Van Diemen's Land in 1852.

Grubb's father William Dawson Grubb (1817–1879) had emigrated to Van Diemen's Land at the age of 18, although later returning to England to study law. At this time he also married Marianne (née Beaumont; d. June 1905, aged 89), a native of Huddersfield, Yorkshire. William Grubb later became a member of the Tasmanian Legislative Council (1869–1879).

He was educated at Horton College, Mona Vale, Ross, Tasmania and after school, took up farming, including Merino sheep and North Devon cattle.

== Vocations ==
In 1882 Grubb was elected to the Tasmanian House of Assembly, representing the seat of Selby. He served until 1885, when he had announced he was not continuing.

He remained a pastoralist, and sheep and cattle breeder, on the property 'Strathroy', near Launceston. He was a director of the Tasmanian Woolgrowers' Agency Company Limited, the Tasmania mine, the Commercial Bank of Tasmania, and president of the National Agricultural and Pastoral Society.

== Later life ==
Grubb died on 20 May 1930, aged 80, in Launceston, caused by a heavy fall after thrown from a trap due to the horse slipping. The funeral was considered impressive, with well over 100 motor cars in the funeral cortege.

He was survived by his sons, Geoffrey, and R. C., three married daughters, and his second wife. Another son had died the month earlier, on 28 April 1930. Grubb was buried next to his first wife, Marion (who had died earlier at Sydney, 15 July 1911).

Tasmanian House of Assembly
Preceded by Thomas Just	Member for Selby; 1882–1885	Succeeded by William Sidebottom
