= William Batchelor =

Australian politician

William Eastgate Batchelor (17 July 1840 – 28 November 1915) was an Australian politician.

He was born in London, England. And in 1903, he was elected to the Tasmanian House of Assembly as the member for North Launceston. And was a member of the Anti-Socialist Party (Now formerly Free Trade Party). However, he was defeated, which led to his departure on March 29, 1906. Batchelor died in Launceston in 1915.
