= Electoral district of East Devon =

Former colonial electoral district of Tasmania

East Devon Tasmania—House of Assembly
- State: Tasmania
- Created: 1871
- Abolished: 1897
- Demographic: Metropolitan

The electoral district of East Devon, sometimes referred to as Devon East, was an electoral district of the Tasmanian House of Assembly. It was based on Tasmania's north coast in the town of Devonport and the surrounding rural area.

The seat was created as a single-member seat ahead of the 1871 election following the abolition of the Devon seat. In 1886, it became a two-member seat, and at the 1897 election, it was abolished and split into the electorates of Devonport and Latrobe.

== Members for East Devon ==
Single member: 1871–1886
Member	Term		
Adolphus Rooke	1871–1872	Two members: 1886–1897	
James Dooley	1872–1891	Member 2	Term
James Dooley	1872–1891	Arthur Young	1886–1891
John Henry	1891–1897	Henry Murray	1891–1897
