= Thomas Massey (Australian politician) =

Australian politician

Thomas William Massey (1830 - 15 January 1914) was an Australian politician. He was a member of the Tasmanian House of Assembly from June 1902 to April 1903, representing the electorate of Selby.

Massey was elected to the House of Assembly unopposed in 1902 following the mid-term death of MP Frank Archer. He was aligned with the opposition to Premier Elliott Lewis and with the Reform League. The Selby seat was abolished in a redistribution in 1903, and Massey was defeated for the new seat of North Esk.

Massey was a member and chairman of the Invermay Town Board (to 1907), a justice of the peace, a member of the Licensing Bench and from 1895 to 1909 an Anglican parish church warden. He opposed the 1907 amalgamation of the Invermay Board with the Launceston municipality, but was outvoted and resigned.
