= Electoral district of Morven =

Former Tasmanian House of Assembly electoral district

The Electoral district of Morven was a single-member electoral district of the Tasmanian House of Assembly. It centred on the town of Evandale to the south of Launceston.

The seat was created ahead of the Assembly's first election held in 1856, and was renamed Evandale at the 1886 election.

== Members for Morven ==
Member	Term
Frederick Innes	1856–1862
Alexander Rose	1862–1866
John Gleadow	1866–1869
John Whitehead	1869–1880
James Cox	1880–1882
John Falkiner	1882–1886
