= Vincent Giblin =

Australian cricketer and banker

Personal information
- Full name: Vincent Wanostrocht Giblin
- Born: 13 November 1817; Kingston-upon-Thames, Surrey, England
- Died: 15 May 1884 (aged 66); Milsons Point, New South Wales, Australia

Domestic team information
- Years: Team
- 1851: Tasmania
- Only First-class: 11 February 1851 Tasmania v Victoria

Career statistics
Competition	First-class
Matches	1
Runs scored	8
Batting average	4.00
100s/50s	0/0
Top score	7*
Catches/stumpings	0/–
- Source: CricketArchive, 5 January 2011

Vincent Wanostrocht Giblin (born 13 November 1817 in Kingston-upon-Thames, Surrey, England), was an Australian banker and cricket player, who played one game for Tasmania. He has the distinction of having participated in the first ever first-class match in Australia, and opened the batting in the second innings.

He was a member of Tasmania's notable Giblin family, whose members included William Robert Giblin (1840–1887), Tasmanian Premier and Supreme Court Judge.

Giblin served as manager of the Commercial Bank in Hobart until 1853, when he moved to Victoria to take a managerial position in the newly founded Bank of Victoria, and was also president of the Geelong Land and Building Society around 1860. He was manager of the Geelong branch of the Bank of Victoria in 1868 when he succeeded A. H. Richardson as manager of the Australian Joint Stock Bank in Sydney.

Giblin died on 15 May 1884, in Milsons Point, New South Wales at the age of 66.

== See also ==
- List of Tasmanian representative cricketers
