= John von Stieglitz =

Australian politician

Member of the Tasmanian House of Assembly for Evandale
- In office 22 May 1891 – 2 April 1903
- Preceded by: John Falkiner
- Succeeded by: Seat abolished

Personal details
- Born: John Charles von Stieglitz; 18 November 1844 Launceston, Tasmania
- Died: 26 May 1916 (aged 71) Hazelbrook, New South Wales

John Charles von Stieglitz (18 November 1844 – 26 May 1916) was an Australian politician.

Von Stieglitz was born in Launceston in Tasmania in 1844. He worked as a surveyor in North Queensland and is believed to have named Thuringowa after his ancestral home of Thuringia. In 1891 he was elected to the Tasmanian House of Assembly, representing the seat of Evandale. He served his seat was abolished in 1903; he was defeated contesting North Esk. He died in 1916 in Hazelbrook, New South Wales.

Tasmanian House of Assembly
Preceded by John Falkiner	Member for Evandale; 1891–1903	Seat abolished
