= Ronald Smith (politician) =

Australian politician

Member of the Tasmanian House of Assembly for Launceston
- In office 20 January 1897 – 9 March 1900
- Preceded by: New seat
- Succeeded by: Peter McCrackan/Robert Sadler

Personal details
- Born: Ronald Whitefoord Smith; 1855 Sandy Bay, Van Diemen's Land
- Died: 8 August 1909 (aged 53–54) Hobart, Tasmania

Ronald Whitefoord Smith (1855 – 8 August 1909) was an Australian politician.

Smith was born in Sandy Bay in Van Diemen's Land in 1855. In 1897 he was elected to the Tasmanian House of Assembly, representing the seat of Launceston. He served until his defeat in 1900. He died in 1909 in Hobart.

Tasmanian House of Assembly
New seat	Member for Launceston; 1897–1900	Succeeded by Peter McCrackan; Robert Sadler
