= Andrew Inglis Clark =

Australian politician

The Honourable Andrew Inglis Clark
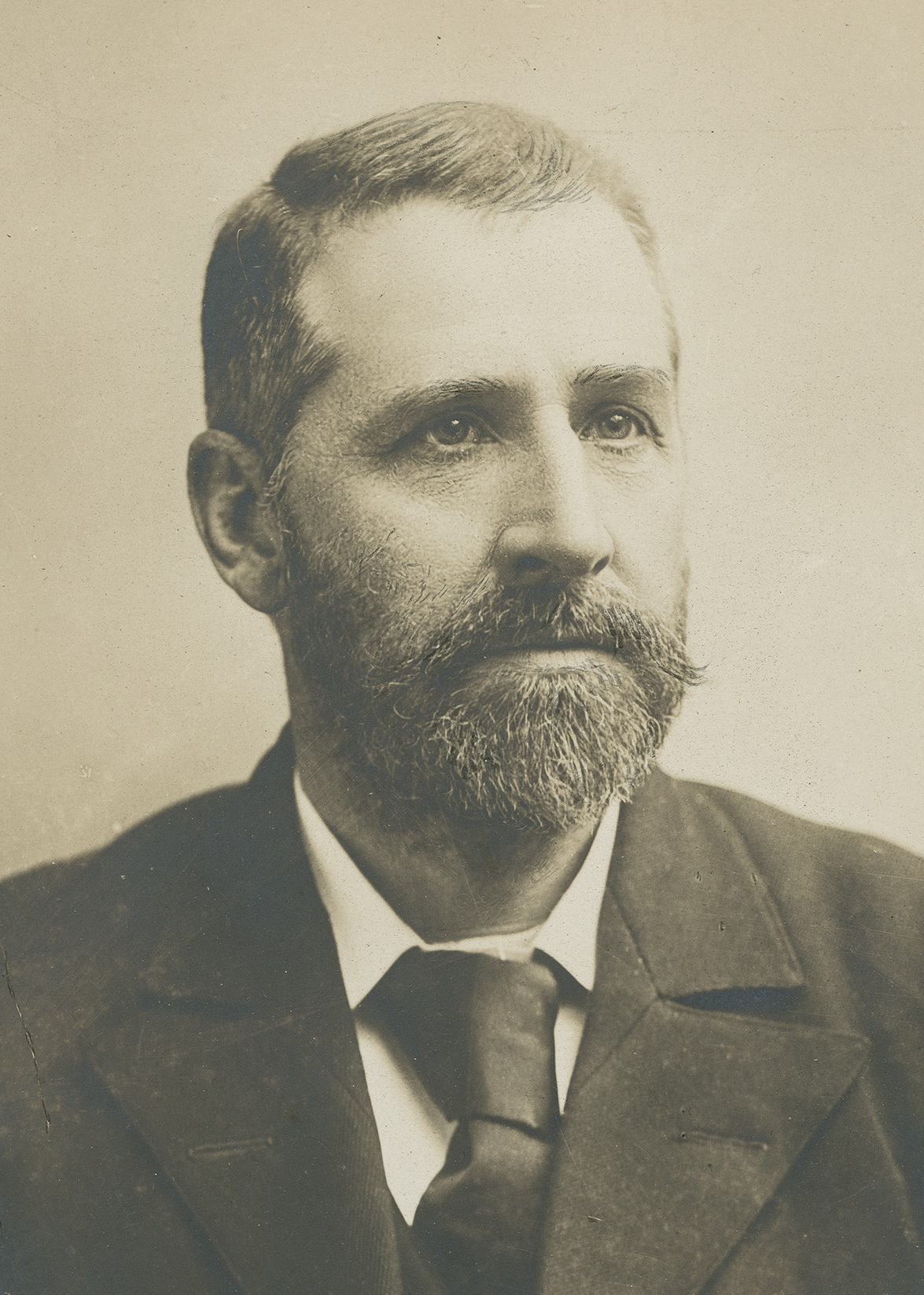

Judge of the Tasmanian Supreme Court
- In office 1 June 1898 – 14 November 1907 Serving with John McIntyre
- Chief Justice: John Stokell Dodds
- Preceded by: Robert Patten Adams
- Succeeded by: Herbert Nicholls

Member of the Federal Council of Australasia
- Appointed
- In office 3 January 1888 – 1 January 1901 Serving with: Samuel Griffith; Robert Hamilton; Adye Douglas; Thomas Joseph Byrnes; Robert Frederick Sholl; Alexander Matheson
- Monarch: Victoria
- Preceded by: Position established

16th Leader of the Opposition in Tasmania
- In office November 1897 – May 1898
- Premier: Edward Braddon
- Preceded by: Elliott Lewis
- Succeeded by: Stafford Bird

13th Attorney-General of Tasmania
- In office 14 April 1894 – 23 October 1897
- Premier: Edward Braddon
- Preceded by: Elliott Lewis
- Succeeded by: Don Urquhart
- In office 29 March 1887 – 17 August 1892
- Premier: Philip Fysh
- Preceded by: Richard Lucas
- Succeeded by: Elliott Lewis

Member of the Tasmanian House of Assembly
- In office 20 January 1897 – 17 June 1898 Serving with: Philip Fysh; John Bradley; Edward Mulcahy; Alfred Crisp; William Page
- Preceded by: Electorate established
- Succeeded by: Charles Hoggins
- Constituency: Hobart
- In office 4 March 1887 – 20 January 1897 Serving with: William Belbin; Edward Giblin; John Bradley
- Preceded by: John Stokell Dodds
- Succeeded by: Robert Patterson (1903)
- Constituency: South Hobart
- In office 26 July 1878 – 29 May 1882
- Preceded by: Charles Hamilton Bromby
- Succeeded by: William Henry Archer
- Constituency: Norfolk Plains

Personal details
- Born: Andrew Inglis Clark; 24 February 1848 Hobart, Van Diemen's Land
- Died: 14 November 1907 (aged 59) Hobart, Tasmania, Australia
- Resting place: Queenborough Cemetery, Sandy Bay, Hobart, Tasmania
- Citizenship: British; Australian
- Party: Independent
- Spouse: Grace Paterson Ross (m. 1878)
- Children: 8
- Parent: Alexander Clark (father)
- Education: Hobart High School
- Alma mater: Christ's College, Hobart (AA) (Note: Did not complete.)
- Occupation: Engineer; Lawyer; Politician
- Known for: Contribution to Federation of Australia; Contribution to Australian Republicanism; Contribution to the Australian Constitution; Electoral reform in Australia

Andrew Inglis Clark (24 February 1848 – 14 November 1907) was an Australian founding father and co-author of the Australian Constitution; he was also an engineer, barrister, politician, electoral reformer and jurist. He initially qualified as an engineer, but he re-trained as a barrister to effectively fight for social causes which deeply concerned him. After a long political career, mostly spent as Attorney-General and briefly as Opposition Leader, he was appointed a Senior Justice of the Supreme Court of Tasmania. Despite being acknowledged as the leading expert on the Australian Constitution, he was never appointed to the High Court of Australia.

He popularised the Hare-Clark voting system, and introduced it to Tasmania. In addition Clark was a prolific author, though most of his writings were never published, rather they were circulated privately. Clark was also Vice-Chancellor of the University of Tasmania. Throughout his life, Clark was a progressive. He championed the rights of workers to organise through trades unions, universal suffrage (including women's suffrage) and the rights to a fair trial – all issues which today we take for granted, but were so radical in the 1880s that he was described as a 'communist' by the Hobart Mercury.

In one summation, "Clark was an Australian Jefferson, who, like the great American Republican, fought for Australian independence; an autonomous judiciary; a wider franchise and lower property qualifications; fairer electoral boundaries; checks and balances between the judicature, legislature and executive; modern, liberal universities; and a Commonwealth that was federal, independent and based on natural rights." Less favourably, a contemporary, J.B. Walker, privately judged him an "eloquent, impressive, dignified ... doctrinaire politician ... wanting in practical ability".

Yet he also had a rich and warm home life. He is described as "never too busy to mend a toy for a child, and his wife once wrote on hearing of his imminent return from America: 'to celebrate your return I must do something or bust'".

The Australian federal Division of Clark is named after him.

== Early life and marriage ==
Clark was born in Hobart, Tasmania, the son of a Scottish engineer, Alexander Clark. He was educated at Hobart High School. After leaving school, he was apprenticed to his family's engineering business, becoming a qualified engineer, and finally its business manager. His father had established a highly successful engineering business, based on an iron foundry. The business was also involved with industrial design and construction of flour mills, water mills, coal mines and other substantial undertaking.

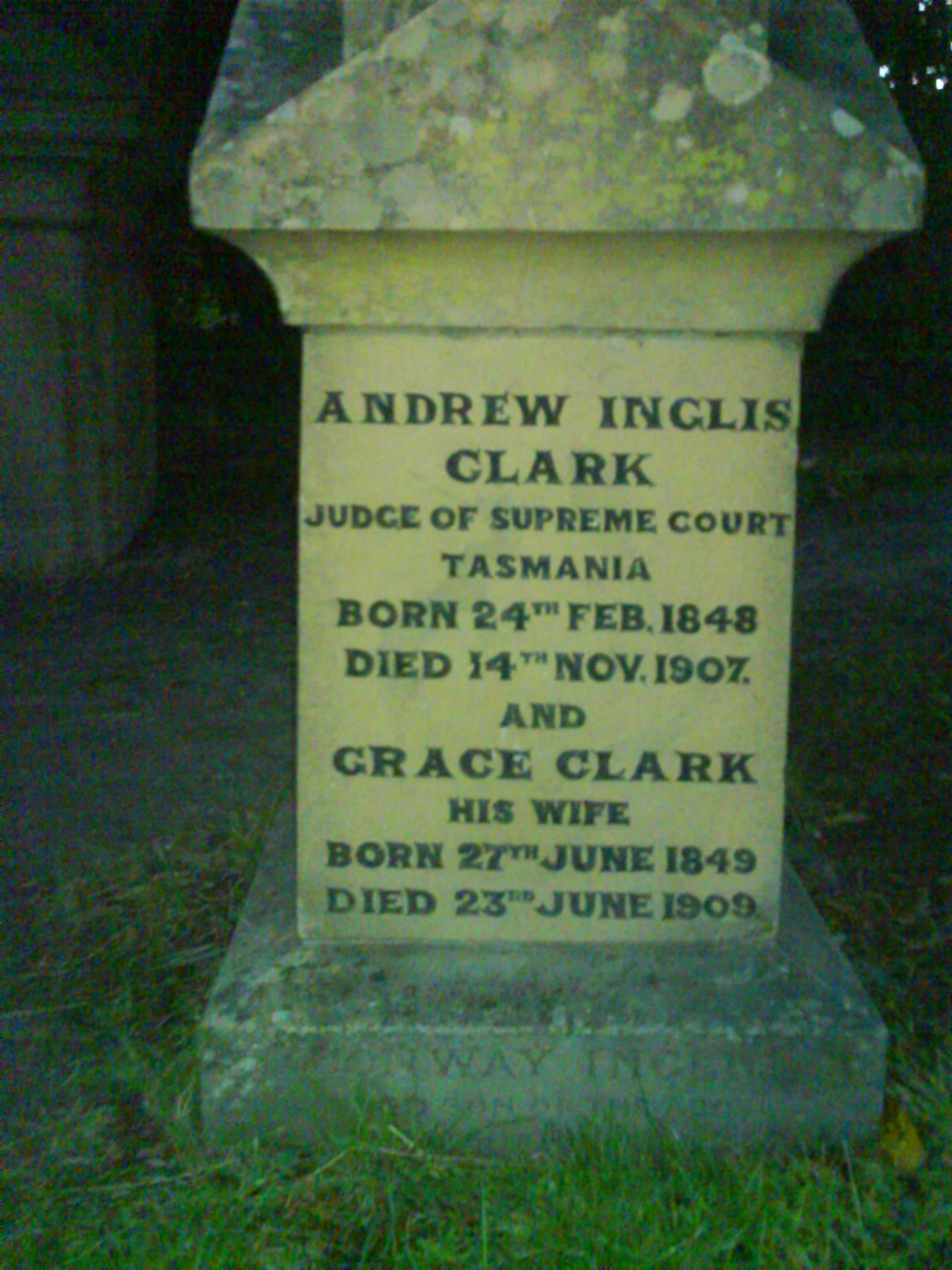

He grew to manhood during the 1860s, when the major issue, even in remote Tasmania, was the American Civil War and emancipation. This last issue had an especial resonance in Tasmania where a form of slavery, transportation, had been abolished as recently as 1853. Convicts were still a common sight for years later. As late as 1902, Clark would publicly be moved to tears when discussing slavery. Clark became fascinated by all things American.

In 1872, Clark disappointed his father by leaving to study law, becoming an articled clerk with R. P. Adams. He was called to the bar in 1877.

Clark, as a child attended a Baptist Sabbatical School until 1872 when the chapel was dissolved on a motion put by Clark due to the "lack of discipline and proper order of government in worship." He then joined a Unitarian chapel, which led him into contact with leading American Unitarians, including Moncure Conway and Oliver Wendell Holmes Jr. The friendship formed with the latter would strongly influence his views and the development of the Clarks' draft of the Australian Constitution.

Early in his life, Clark developed a passion for justice and liberty. He joined the Minerva Club where he participated in debate on contemporary social issues. In 1874, he edited its journal Quadrilateral. As a 'young ardent republican', he was also a member of the American Club, where at the 1876 annual dinner, he declared "We have met here tonight in the name of the principles which were proclaimed by the founders of the Anglo-American Republic... and we do so because we believe those principles to be permanently applicable to the politics of the world". He was inspired by Italian Risorgimento, especially by Joseph Mazzini of whom he had a picture in every room. He became a radical, a democrat and a republican.

In 1878 he married Grace Paterson (Ross) Clark, the daughter of local shipbuilder John Ross, with whom he had five sons and two daughters:

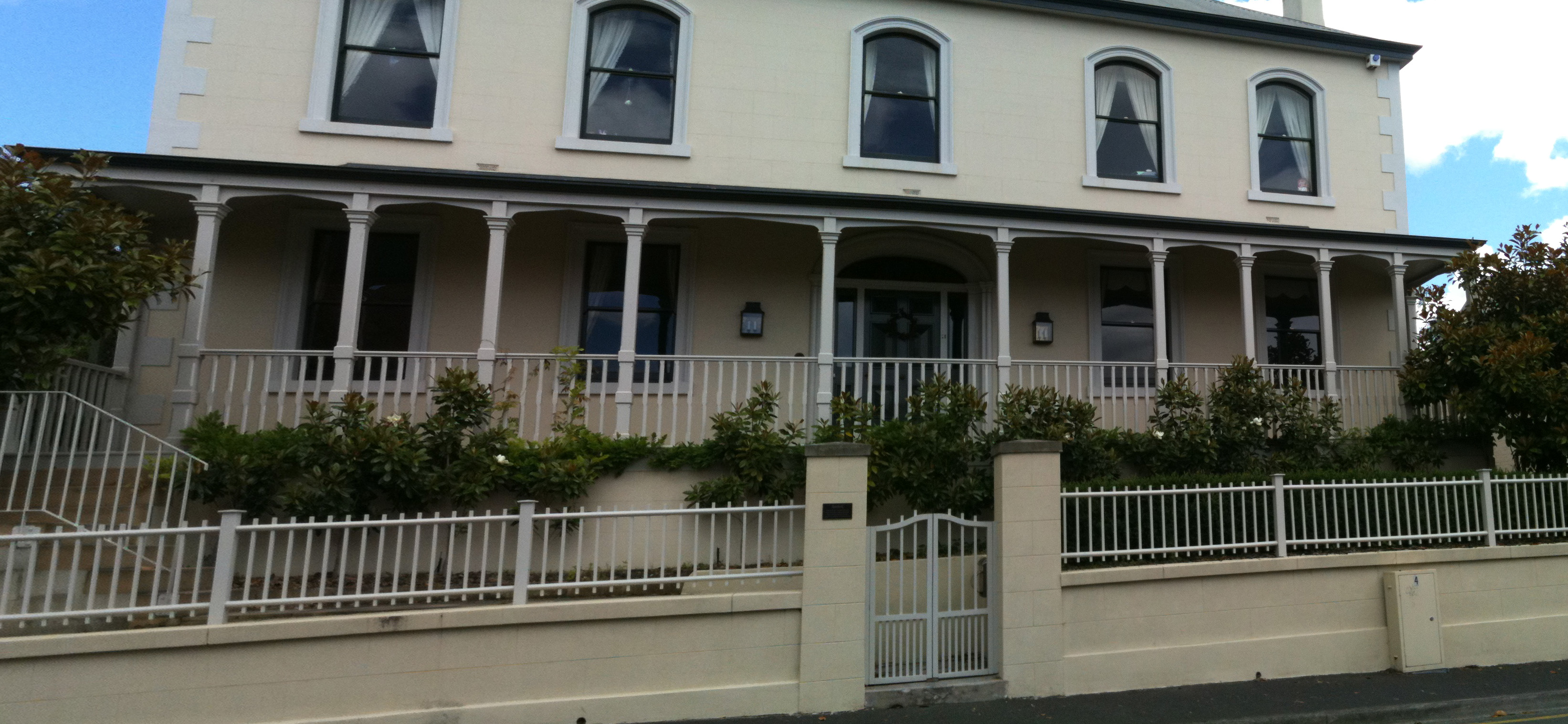
"Rosebank" – home of Andrew Inglis Clark located in Battery Point

- Esma (1878)
- Alexander (1879) Marine engineer
- Andrew (1882) Justice of the Supreme Court of Tasmania 1928–1953.
- Conway (1883) Architect
- Wendell (1885) Doctor
- Melvyn (1886)
- Carrel (1888) Clerk of Tasmanian Legislative Council
- Ethel (1889)

One of the many mysteries of Clark's private life is the circumstances of his marriage. As the son of a prominent family, and a leading figure of his church who was marrying the daughter of a well-known businessman, his marriage might have been expected to be a major social event. Instead, they slipped away to Melbourne, where they were married in the presence of a few friends.

== Political career ==
In 1878, Clark stood for election to the House of Assembly, despite his reputation as an extreme ultra-republican. He was attacked by the Hobart Mercury for "holding such very extreme ultra-republican, if not revolutionary, ideas" that his proper place should be among the 'Communists', and the Launceston Examiner as a "stranger from Hobart". He was elected, unopposed to the electorate of Norfolk Plains. His election was largely due to the influence of Thomas Reibey, a political power broker and a recent Premier.

Clark was the founder of the Southern Tasmania Political Reform Association, whose agenda included manhood suffrage, fixed term parliaments, and electoral reform. While a member of the House of Assembly, Clark was regarded as republican and ultra-progressive. He was one of the few members to legislate as a backbencher and introduce a private members bill. He failed to reform industrial law by amending the Master and Servant Act, but he succeeded with the Criminal Procedure Amendment Act in 1881. He also assisted with reframing the customs tariff.

In the 1882 election, Clark was defeated. He failed when he stood for election in 1884 (East Hobart) and 1886 (South Hobart). In 1887, Clark was re-elected, in a by-election as member for East Hobart. In 1888, he was re-elected as member for South Hobart and remained there until the seat was abolished in 1897. He was then the member for Hobart until he resigned upon his appointment to the Supreme Court in 1898.

In March 1888, he became Attorney General in the government of Sir Philip Fysh. Since the Premier was in the Legislative Council, Clark was responsible for introducing legislation into the Assembly. Over the next five years he shepherded through the lower house much progressive and humanitarian legislation. His goal was to break the power of property in Tasmanian politics. The legislation covered such diverse reforms as legalising trades unions, providing parliamentary salaries, preventing cruelty to animals, reforming laws on lunacy, trusteeship and companies, the custody of children and the protection of children from neglect and abuse. He also introduced laws to restrict the immigration of Chinese. Clark failed in his attempts to impose a land tax, introduce universal (including female) suffrage and centralise the police.

Clark was the most important 19th-century Attorney-General of Tasmania. His considerable drafting skills enabled him to modernise and simplify the law over a number of areas. He introduced a total of 228 bills into the Assembly. His best known achievement as Attorney-General was the introduction of proportional representation based on the Hare-Clark system of the single transferable vote.

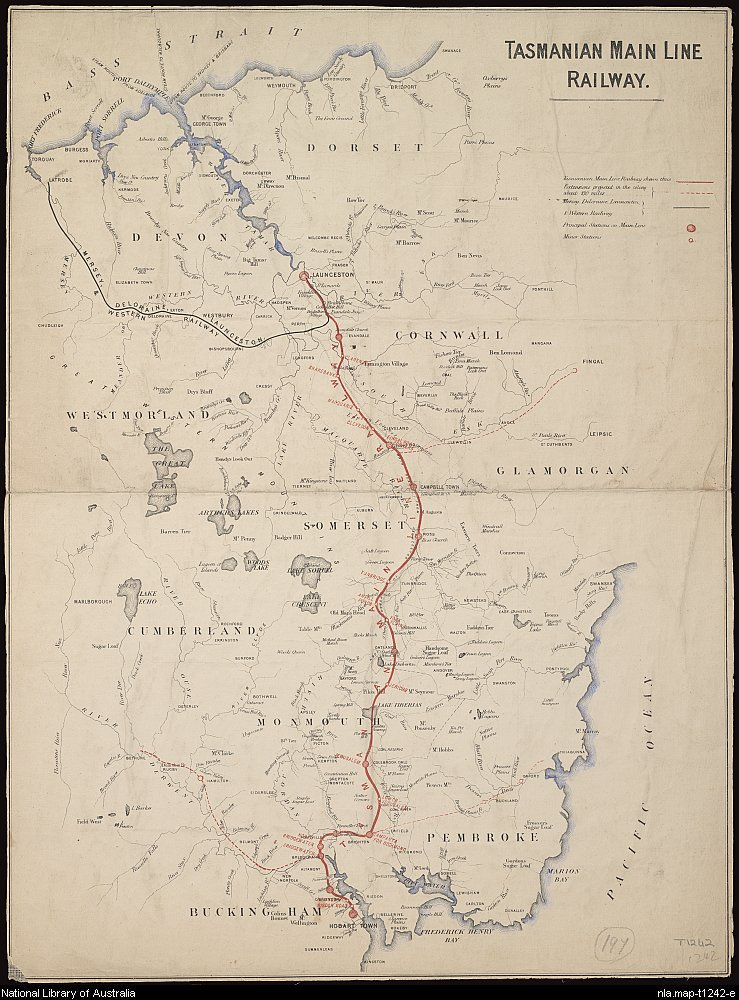
Map of the Mainline Railway, c. 1880

One of the major political issues addressed by Clark during his career concerned the Tasmanian Main Line Railway – a railway which connected Tasmania's two main cities, Hobart and Launceston. In 1873, the Main Line Railway Company began the construction of the line, which opened in 1876. There were a series of disputes between the Company and the government over payments due to the Company under its Deed of Concession. Clark had spoken about the problem, advocating the acquisition of the Company by the government as early as 1878. With his dual qualifications as both an engineer and a lawyer, Clark was in a unique position to understand the issues involved. As Attorney-General, he was the government's chief negotiator.

In 1889, the Supreme Court awarded the Company arrears of interest. Clark urged the government to appeal, and in 1890 he went to England to argue the case before the Privy Council. Clark may have been a poor speaker in court, but he was a superb negotiator. It was his forte. With full powers, he settled the case out of court by arranging the purchase of the Company's property by the government.

In 1891, Clark returned to Tasmania from London by way of the United States. It was a fateful choice. He was introduced to a fellow Unitarian Oliver Wendell Holmes Jr., with whom he corresponded for the rest of his life. The contacts and people he met in Boston were to profoundly inform his views about political constitutions. Not the least of the consequences was the introduction of the term "commonwealth" to describe the Australian polity. This term is used in two ways: the Commonwealth Government and the Commonwealth of Australia.

In 1892, the fall of the Fysh government ended Clark's term as Attorney-General. When Sir Edward Braddon formed a government in 1894, Clark again became Attorney-General, the same year he was given the title 'Honourable' for life. He resigned in 1897, when his colleagues failed to consult him over the lease of Crown land to private interests, after which he became Leader of the Opposition. Clark left politics to become a Justice of the Supreme Court of Tasmania in 1898.

== Clark and Australian Federation ==
Clark positioned himself ambiguously with respect to the cause of Australian Federation. Clark was a delegate to the National Australasian Convention of 1891, and was a member of its committee which produced a draft constitution. However, he did not stand for the election of delegates to the Australian Federal Convention of 1897, and embarked on an overseas journey two days after it commenced. Instead of the Convention's proposal to compensate States' for their loss of tariff revenue subsequent to Federation by a guarantee of a share of Commonwealth revenue, he favoured the Commonwealth's assumption of States' debts. Despite the urgings of Federationists, Clark abstained from supporting the Federal cause in the subsequent campaign. A week before the 1898 referendum on Federation, he let it be known "It is not his intention to advise any elector on how to vote".

== Hare–Clark electoral system ==
In 1896, after several failed attempts, Clark was able to get a system of proportional representation adopted by the Tasmanian Parliament, but it was to be only on a trial basis for both Hobart (to elect 6 MPs) and Launceston (to elect 4 MPs). The modified single transferable vote method, immediately known as the Hare–Clark system, was renewed annually until suspended in 1902. Clark died in 1907, just as permanent proportional representation struggled through Parliament and over a year before it was used for the first time throughout Tasmania at the general election in April 1909.

== Early legal career ==
Clark was called to the bar in 1877. He soon gained a reputation as a criminal lawyer in a 'poisoning case', but went on to gain a large practice in civil and commercial law as well. He practised law both while in and out of parliament. During those periods when he was not serving as Attorney-General, he worked hard to build a successful practice. He failed to find his fortune in the law due to his generosity and refusal 'to accept anything beyond a reasonable and modest fee'. In 1887 he went into partnership with Matthew Wilkes Simmons.

His career in private practice gave him a broad grounding in the law which stood him in good stead once he was promoted to the bench. Clark was knowledgeable in all branches of the law, but pre-eminent as a constitutional lawyer and jurist.

Clark, never in robust health, in fact described as "small, spare, [and] nervous" by Alfred Deakin, died at his home 'Rosebank' in Battery Point on 14 November 1907. He is buried in the old Queenborough Cemetery at Sandy Bay.
