= Electoral district of Central Hobart =

Former electoral district of Tasmania

The electoral district of Central Hobart, sometimes referred to as Hobart Central, was an electoral district of the Tasmanian House of Assembly. It was based in Tasmania's capital city, Hobart.

The seat was created as a single-member seat ahead of the 1871 election following the dissolution of the multi-member Hobart Town seat. It was abolished at the 1886 election when neighbouring seats absorbed its area and became two-member seats.

The seat was then recreated as a single-member seat at the 1903 election and was abolished when the Tasmanian parliament adopted the Hare-Clark electoral model for the entire state in 1909.

== Members for Central Hobart ==
First incarnation: 1871–1886

Member	Term
William Giblin	1871–1877
David Lewis	1877–1882
William Guesdon	1882–1886

Second incarnation: 1903–1909

Member	Party	Term
Herbert Nicholls	Opposition	1903–1909
