= Irene M. Giblin =

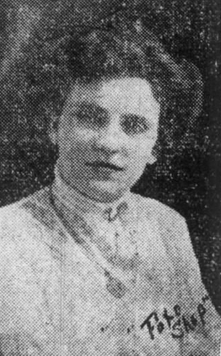
- Irene Giblin, from a 1907 publication.

Background information
- Born: December 8, 1888; St. Louis, Missouri, US
- Died: December 5, 1974 St. Louis, Missouri, US
- Genres: ragtime
- Occupation: composer
- Instrument: piano
- Years active: 1905–1911

Irene Marie Giblin (August 12, 1888 – May 12, 1974), also known as Irene Giblin O'Brien, was an American pianist and composer of ragtime. She published a total of ten pieces between 1905 and 1911. Her song "Chicken Chowder" of 1905 was her biggest success.

== Early life ==
Irene M. Giblin was born to Richard T. Giblin, a printer, and Nora Reardon Giblin in 1888, in St. Louis, Missouri. She was the eldest of six children.

== Music ==
Giblin was a popular young woman in the Irish-American community in St. Louis. She worked at music stores Grand Leader and Stix, Baer and Fuller, playing the piano for several hours a day to convince the customers to buy the latest scores.

Giblin published a total of ten ragtime songs over a period of six years, from 1905 to 1911. Among them, "Sleepy Lou" and "The Aviator Rag" were popular sellers. However, it was her first rag, "Chicken Chowder" (1905) that was her most successful. She published her last rag in 1911, "The Dixie Rag".

== Personal life ==
Giblin married Edward Patrick O'Brien, an accountant for the Missouri Pacific Railway Company, in 1908. They had two sons: Richard in 1911 and Edward Jr. in 1915. Her husband died in 1958; Irene Giblin O'Brien died in 1974, at the age of 85 years, in St. Louis, Missouri.

In 2018, the San Francisco Conservatory of Music marked the 150th birthday of Scott Joplin, along with the 130th birthdays of May Aufderheide and Irene Giblin, with a special concert of their works.

== List of compositions ==
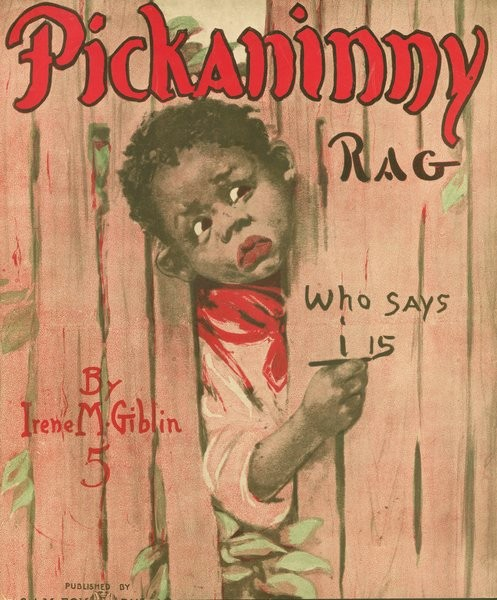
"Pickaninny Rag", 1908

1905

- Quit, You're Kidding
- Chicken Chowder – Characteristic Two-Step

1906

- Sleepy Lou – A Raggy Two-Step
- Soap Suds – March Two-Step Characteristic

1908

- Black Feather – Two-Step
- Pickaninny Rag

1910

- The Aviator Rag
- Columbia Rag
- Ketchup Rag

1911

- The Dixie Rag
