= William Lamerton =

Australian politician

William Lamerton (1843 – 7 May 1918) was an Australian politician.

== Biography ==
Lamerton was born in St Austell in Cornwall, England. In 1903 he was elected to the Tasmanian House of Assembly as the member for Zeehan, initially for the Labor Party but later as an Independent Labor member. After his defeat in 1906 he joined the Anti-Socialist Party and eventually the Liberal Party. Lamerton died in 1918 at Launceston, Tasmania.
