= Herbert Nicholls =

Australian politician

Sir Herbert Nicholls KCMG

6th Chief Justice of Tasmania
- In office 1 July 1914 – 31 October 1937
- Preceded by: Sir John Dodds
- Succeeded by: Harold Crisp

Leader of the Opposition (Tasmania)
- In office 29 May 1906 – 1 January 1909
- Preceded by: William Propsting
- Succeeded by: John Earle

Attorney-General of Tasmania
- In office 9 April 1903 – 11 July 1904
- Premier: William Propsting
- Preceded by: Elliott Lewis
- Succeeded by: George Gilmore
- Constituency: Central Hobart

Personal details
- Born: 11 August 1868 Ballarat, Victoria
- Died: 11 November 1940 (aged 72) Hobart, Tasmania, Australia
- Spouse: Helen Sprent (m. 1905)
- Education: University of Tasmania
- Profession: Barrister

Sir Herbert Nicholls KCMG (11 August 1868 – 11 November 1940) was an Australian judge and politician, who served as Chief Justice of Tasmania from 1914 to 1937 and, as an independent member of the Tasmanian House of Assembly from 1900 to 1909, as Attorney-General (1903 to 1904) and Leader of the Opposition (1906 to 1909).

== Early life ==
Nicholls was born in Ballarat, Victoria in 1868, to the English journalist Henry Richard Nicholls and his Irish-born wife Ellen Minchin. He was educated in Ballarat, until his family moved to Hobart, Tasmania in 1883 so his father could take up the editorship of The Mercury newspaper. (His father is the namesake of the H. R. Nicholls Society, formed in 1986.)

== Legal career ==
After working as a mail clerk, Nicholls was articled to Andrew Inglis Clark and Matthew Wilkes Simmons and was admitted to the Bar in 1892. He graduated with a Bachelor of Laws from the University of Tasmania in 1896 and became a barrister.

== Political career ==
At a 1900 by-election, Nicholls was elected as an independent member of the Tasmanian House of Assembly, as one of the members representing the multi-member electoral district of Hobart. He was the first graduate of the University of Tasmania to be elected to parliament.

In 1903 after re-districting on the occasion of the cancellation of the use of STV, he was re-elected, this time as the sole member for Central Hobart.

From 1903 to 1904, Nicholls held two ministries in the cabinet of William Propsting: Attorney-General and Minister administering the Education Act. As Attorney-General, Nicholls represented police superintendent Frederick Pedder, the respondent in the landmark High Court case D'Emden v Pedder.

On 29 May 1906, following the state election the eight opposition members of the House of Assembly voted for Nicholls as their leader.

In December 1908, the cabinet of John Evans unanimously decided to appoint Alfred Dobson, Tasmania's Agent-General in London, as third judge of the Supreme Court of Tasmania. Dobson declined the appointment for personal reasons, and Nicholls was offered the role and accepted. He resigned from the Tasmanian Parliament on 1 January 1909.

== Judicial career ==
Caricature by David Low

When the Chief Justice of Tasmania, Sir John Dodds, died in office in June 1914, Nicholls was appointed as his replacement.

As chief justice, Nicholls served as Administrator of Tasmania on occasions when the Governor of Tasmania was absent from the state, or in between the appointment of governors to the role. Nicholls was serving as administrator in October 1923, when the Nationalist government of Sir Walter Lee lost a confidence motion on the floor of the house. Nicholls refused to dissolve the parliament and call an election, and appointed Joseph Lyons as Premier of a minority Labor government when Lee resigned. Nicholls was lieutenant-governor and administrator of the state for nearly three years from December 1930 to August 1933 between the end of Sir James O'Grady's term and the appointment of Sir Ernest Clark.

== Honours ==
Nicholls was made Knight Bachelor in 1916 for his work as chief justice. In the 1927 Birthday Honours, he was made a Knight Commander of the Order of St Michael and St George (KCMG).

Lake Nicholls in Mount Field National Park is named after him. Nicholls was a frequent visitor to the western highlands region where the lake is located, which was a practically unexplored area at the time.

== Legacy ==
Nicholls authored books:

- Reports of cases determined in the Supreme Court of Tasmania, 2 vols. (1907)

- An Election under the Clark-Hare System. ("Mercury" Office, Hobart, 1899, 12 pp., 8vo.) The various stages of the counting explained; the rules used for transferring surpluses are those proposed in the Electoral Bill, 1899

Political offices
Preceded by Elliott Lewis	Attorney-General of Tasmania; 1903–1904	Succeeded by George Gilmore
Preceded by William Propsting	Leader of the Opposition (Tasmania); 1906–1909	Succeeded by John Earle
Legal offices
Preceded by John Dodds	Chief Justice of Tasmania; 1914–1937	Succeeded by Harold Crisp
