= Electoral district of Hobart =

State electoral district of Tasmania, Australia

The electoral district of Hobart was a multi-member electoral district of the Tasmanian House of Assembly. It was based in Tasmania's capital city, Hobart.

It was created at the 1897 election under a trial of the Hare-Clark electoral model along with the seat of Electoral district of Launceston. It continued for two terms, before being broken up again in 1903 into Central, East, North, South and West Hobart. In 1909, the entire state adopted Hare-Clark, and the Hobart region became part of the Denison division.

== Members for Hobart ==
Term	Member 1	Member 2	Member 3	Member 4	Member 5	Member 6
1897–1900	Philip Fysh (–1898)	John Bradley (–1900)	Andrew Inglis Clark (–1898)	Edward Mulcahy	Alfred Crisp	William Page
1897–1900	William Propsting (1898–)	John Bradley (–1900)	Charles Hoggins (1898–)	Edward Mulcahy	Alfred Crisp	William Page
1900–1903	William Propsting (1898–)	John Bradley (–1900)	Robert Patterson	Edward Mulcahy	Edward Miles (–1900)	William Guesdon
1900–1903	William Propsting (1898–)	Charles Hoggins (1900–)	Robert Patterson	Edward Mulcahy	Herbert Nicholls (1900–)	William Guesdon
