= Matthew Clarke (politician) =

Australian politician

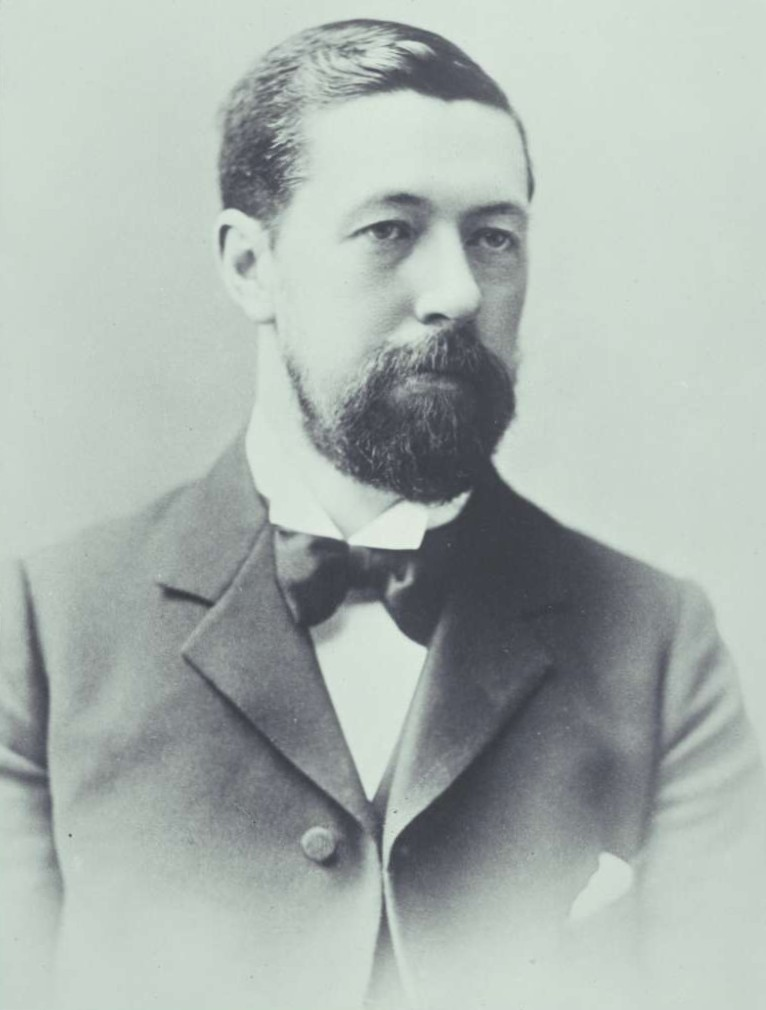
Matthew John Clarke at the 1898 Australasian Federal Convention.

Matthew John Clarke (7 March 1863, Downpatrick – 13 April 1923, Launceston, Tasmania) was an Australian politician. Between 20 January 1897 and 9 March 1900 he was one of the four members for Launceston at the Tasmanian House of Assembly. He was educated at the Royal University of Ireland and the University of Tasmania.
