= Electoral district of Latrobe =

Former electoral district of Tasmania

The Electoral district of Latrobe was a single-member electoral district of the Tasmanian House of Assembly. It was based at Latrobe on Tasmania's north coast near the town of Devonport.

The seat was created in a redistribution ahead of the 1897 election out of the former seat of East Devon, and was abolished when the Tasmanian parliament adopted the Hare-Clark electoral model in 1909. The circumstances of its first by-election were initiated when the member for neighbouring Devonport, John Henry, resigned. At the resulting by-election on 21 June 1898, Ministerial candidate William Aikenhead was elected. However, the election was declared void. In October 1898, the Ministerial member for Latrobe, Henry Murray, resigned to contest the resulting Devonport by-election (held on 25 October 1898), whilst Aikenhead contested the now-vacant seat of Latrobe at a by-election on 15 October 1898. Both were successful. On 25 April 1902, Murray resumed the seat after Aikenhead's death.

== Members for Latrobe ==
Member	Party	Term
Henry Murray	Ministerial	1897–1898
William Aikenhead	Ministerial	1898–1902
Henry Murray	Ministerial	1902–1909
