= Peter Barrett (politician) =

Australian politician

Member of the Tasmanian House of Assembly for North Launceston
- In office 26 July 1886 – 20 January 1897
- Preceded by: Henry Lette
- Succeeded by: Seat abolished

Personal details
- Born: Peter Barrett; 1831 Yorkshire
- Died: 22 July 1907 (aged 75–76) Launceston, Tasmania

Peter Barrett (1831 – 22 July 1907) was an Australian politician.

Barrett was born in Yorkshire in 1844. In 1886 he was elected to the Tasmanian House of Assembly, representing the seat of North Launceston. He served until 1897, when he was defeated contesting Launceston. He died in 1907 in Launceston.

Tasmanian House of Assembly
Preceded by Henry Lette	Member for North Launceston; 1886–1897	Abolished
