= Alexander Fowler =

Australian politician

Member of the Tasmanian House of Assembly for North Launceston
- In office 31 January 1893 – December 1893 Serving with Peter Barrett
- Preceded by: David Scott
- Succeeded by: Allan MacDonald

Member of the Tasmanian House of Assembly for Launceston
- In office 20 January 1897 – 4 October 1901
- Preceded by: New seat
- Succeeded by: Samuel Sutton

Personal details
- Born: Alexander Richard Fowler; 19 September 1847 Leamington, Warwickshire
- Died: 22 July 1911 (aged 63) Launceston, Tasmania

Alexander Richard Fowler (19 September 1847 – 22 July 1911) was an Australian politician.

Fowler was born in Leamington Spa in Warwickshire in 1847. In January 1893 he was elected to the Tasmanian House of Assembly, representing the seat of North Launceston, but he was defeated later that year. He returned to the House in 1897 as one of the members for Launceston, serving until his resignation in 1901. He died in 1911 in Launceston.

Tasmanian House of Assembly
Preceded by David Scott	Member for North Launceston; 1893; Served alongside: Peter Barrett	Succeeded by Allan MacDonald
New seat	Member for Launceston; 1897–1901	Succeeded by Samuel Sutton
