= William Belbin =

Australian politician

Member of the Tasmanian House of Assembly for South Hobart
- In office 6 September 1871 – May 1891
- Preceded by: New seat
- Succeeded by: Edward Giblin

Personal details
- Born: 7 February 1825 Van Diemen's Land
- Died: 26 June 1892 (aged 67) North Sydney, New South Wales
- Occupation: Timber merchant, shipowner

William Belbin (7 February 1825 – 26 June 1892) was an Australian politician.

Belbin was born in Tasmania in 1825. In 1871 he was elected to the Tasmanian House of Assembly, representing the seat of South Hobart. He served until 1891. He died in 1892 in Sydney.

Tasmanian House of Assembly
New seat	Member for South Hobart; 1871–1891	Succeeded by Edward Giblin
