= Peter Giblin =

English mathematician

- Born: 10 July 1943 (age 83); Dartford, England
- Occupation: University Professor
- Known for: Work on Singularity Theory

Peter John Giblin (10 July 1943) is an English mathematician whose primary research involves singularity theory and its application to geometry, computer vision, and computer graphics. Giblin is an emeritus professor of mathematics at the University of Liverpool where he has served on staff for more than 40 years. His positions at Liverpool have included Head of Department (of mathematical sciences), and Head of Division (of pure mathematics).

He is the author or co-author of eight published books, some of which have been translated into Russian. The foreword for the Russian translation of his book Curves and Singularities was written by V. I. Arnold. Giblin has also authored or co-authored over a hundred peer reviewed published articles. The first of these was published in 1968.

== Publications ==
- Giblin, P. J. (1977), Graphs, Surfaces and Homology, Chapman and Hall, ISBN 0-470-98994-7
- Bruce, J. W.; Giblin, P. J. (1984), Curves and Singularities, Cambridge University Press, ISBN 0-521-42999-4
- Bruce, J. W.; Giblin, P. J.; Rippon, P. J. (1990), Microcomputers and Mathematics, Cambridge University Press, ISBN 0-521-37515-0
- Giblin, P. J.; Porteous, I. R. (1990), Challenging Mathematics, Oxford University Press, ISBN 0-19-914361-7
- Giblin, P. J. (1993), Primes and Programming: an Introduction to Number Theory with Computing, Cambridge University Press, ISBN 0-521-40182-8
- Chen, K.; Giblin, P. J.; Alan Irving, A. (1999), Mathematical Explorations in Matlab, Cambridge University Press, ISBN 978-0-521-63920-0
- Hallinan, P. W.; Gordon, G.; Yuille, A. L.; Giblin, P. J.; Mumford, D. (1999), Two and Three Dimensional Patterns of the Face, A. K. Peters, ISBN 978-1-56881-087-4
- Cipolla, R.; Giblin, P. J. (1999), "Visual Motion of Curves and Surfaces", Philosophical Transactions of the Royal Society of London, Series A, vol. 356, Cambridge University Press, p. 1103, Bibcode:1998RSPTA.356.1103C, doi:10.1098/rsta.1998.0213, ISBN 0-521-63251-X
