= Frederick Shaw (Tasmanian politician) =

Australian politician

Frederick Shaw (28 August 1847 - 24 August 1923) was an Australian politician. He was a member of the Tasmanian House of Assembly from 1899 to 1903, representing the electorate of Glamorgan.

Shaw was born at Swansea, Tasmania, son of pastoralist Edward Carr Shaw, and raised on his family's property, "Red Banks". He was a Municipality of Glamorgan councillor for around twenty years, including several terms as warden, and was a long-serving justice of the peace, serving as chairman of the Glamorgan Court of General Sessions and a member of the Licensing Bench.

Shaw was elected to the House of Assembly at an 1899 by-election caused by the resignation of Edward Miles. He was re-elected unopposed in 1900. The Glamorgan electorate was abolished in a 1903 redistribution, and Shaw did not contest that year's election.

In later life, he suffered from partial blindness. He died at his Swansea home in 1923.

His brother Bernard Shaw served as Secretary of Mines and Commissioner of Police. His sister Martha Shaw married Premier of New South Wales William Lyne, becoming Lady Lyne.
