= William Aikenhead =

Australian politician

Member of the Tasmanian House of Assembly for Latrobe
- In office 25 October 1898 – 3 April 1902
- Preceded by: Henry Murray
- Succeeded by: Henry Murray

Personal details
- Born: 7 May 1842 Launceston, Van Diemen's Land
- Died: 3 April 1902 (aged 59) Devonport, Tasmania, Australia
- Relations: James Aikenhead (father)
- Occupation: Newspaper editor

William Aikenhead (7 May 1842 – 3 April 1902) was an Australian politician, who was a member of the Tasmanian House of Assembly from 1898 until his death in office in 1902.

Aikenhead was born in Launceston. His father, James Aikenhead, was the founder, editor and proprietor of The Examiner newspaper, and later became a politician on the Tasmanian Legislative Council. In 1869, James Aikenhead transferred his editorship of The Examiner to his son, where he worked for ten years.

On 21 June 1898, Aikenhead stood as a candidate in a by-election for the electoral district of Devonport. He was elected, however one of the other candidates, John McCall, petitioned the Supreme Court of Tasmania that Aikenhead had engaged in bribery and "treating by agent"—Aikenhead's representative, Archibald Phillips, had promised electors a "go in" if he was elected, and the night after the election plied local hotels with free beer paid for by Aikenhead. The court found against Aikenhead, and declared his election void, although they did not declare McCall elected, and instead called another by-election. Aikenhead was disqualified from running for Devonport for two years, however when the member for Latrobe, Henry Murray, resigned to contest the Devonport by-election, Aikenhead nominated for the Latrobe vacancy and was elected.

Aikenhead was re-elected in the March 1900 general election, and continued to serve until his death in office on 3 April 1902. He was succeeded by Murray, whom he had defeated in 1900, and who returned to his old seat when elected unopposed in the by-election triggered by Aikenhead's death.

Tasmanian House of Assembly
Preceded by Henry Murray	Member for Latrobe; 1898–1902	Succeeded by Henry Murray
