= James Gaffney (politician) =

Australian politician

James Joseph Gaffney (29 March 1853 – 25 June 1913) was an Australian politician. He was a member of the Tasmanian House of Assembly from 1899 to 1903, representing the electorate of Lyell.

He was born in Launceston, Tasmania, and raised at Westbury and Deloraine. As an adult, he moved to Waratah, where he worked at Mount Bischoff before going into business for himself. He later sold his Waratah enterprises and moved to Strahan, where he was a hotelkeeper and merchant. He was chairman of the town board and master warden of the marine board at Strahan, and was a long-serving member of both institutions. The Launceston Examiner said of Gaffney that "there is no name better known on the West Coast".

In 1899, he was elected to the Tasmanian House of Assembly as the member for Lyell. In 1903, he was initially reported to be intending to retire, but then decided to contest the seat of Queenstown instead. His re-election campaign ended abruptly in March when his nomination was refused on account of an informality.

He was subsequently nominated to contest the 1903 federal election in the Australian House of Representatives seat of Darwin, held by the Labor MP King O'Malley. He was nominated as an independent, supporting free trade and opposing the Edmund Barton government. However, after reports that his campaign was floundering, he withdrew from the race on 10 December - six days before the election - and endorsed the anti-Labor rival and Protectionist Party candidate James Brickhill, though he formally remained on the ballot.

He died at St Margaret's Hospital in Launceston in 1913; his funeral was held in Hobart.
