= Joseph Woollnough =

Australian politician

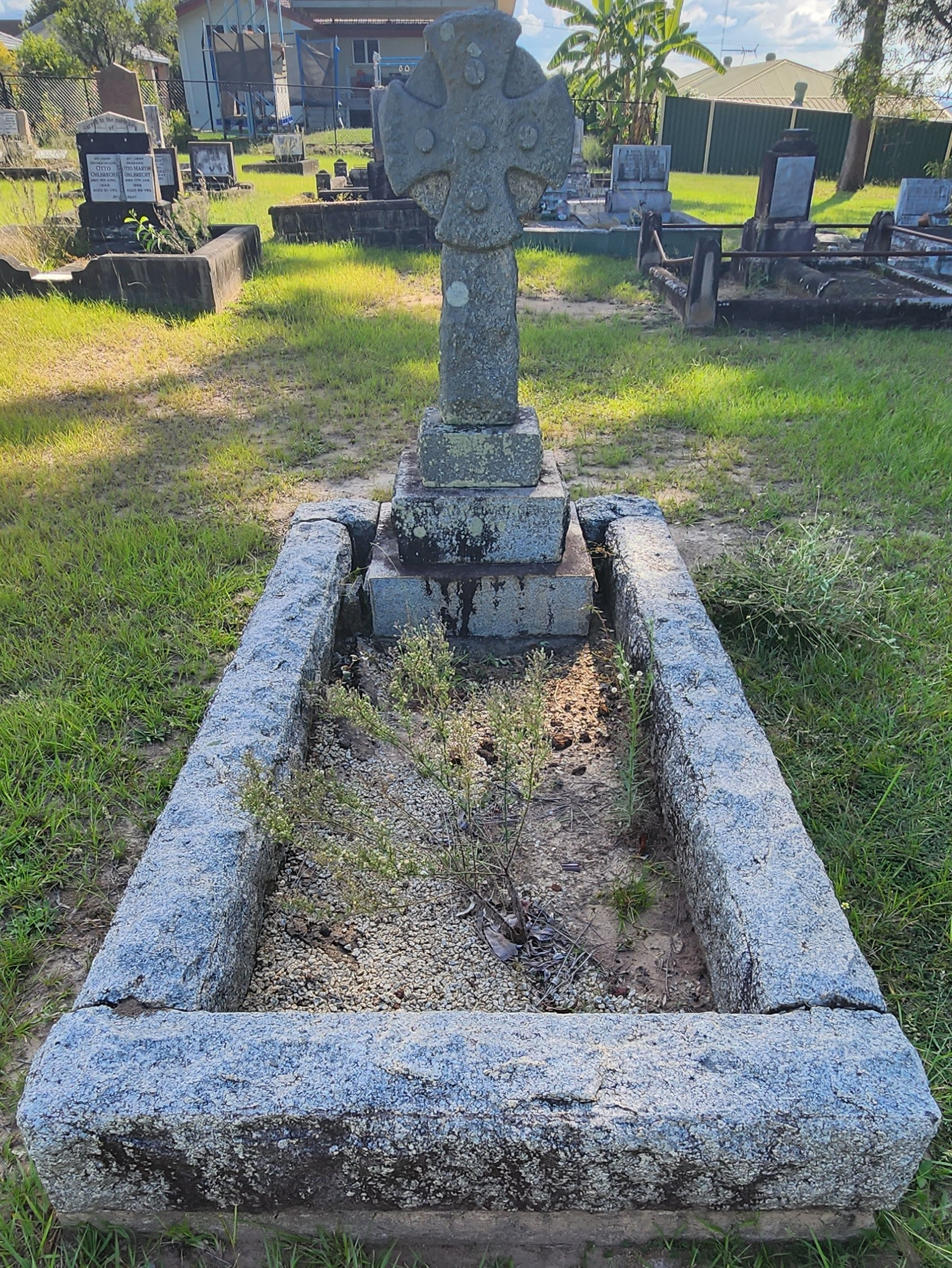
Gravesite in Bald Hills Cemetery, Bracken Ridge. Queensland. Australia.

Joseph Boss Williams Woollnough (1833 – 16 July 1917) was an Australian politician and Anglican church minister. He was a prominent figure in the Anglican church in Tasmania from his arrival to take up a senior church role in 1883, the member for Sorell in the Tasmanian House of Assembly from 1893 to 1903 and the owner of the historic former Model Prison at Port Arthur from 1889 until his death.

Woollnough studied at Oxford University and became an Anglican church minister. In September 1883, he arrived from England to take up the post of organising secretary to the Anglican Church Society. He was appointed inspector of religious instruction in the diocese of Tasmania in 1884. He was a prominent member of the Tasmanian synod over three decades, and was one of the Tasmanian representatives at national church congresses on multiple occasions. He was a long-serving military chaplain, being appointed chaplain to the Tasmanian Reserve Forces in 1885, and remaining a senior chaplain when the colonial military forces were unified at Federation. He was also chairman of the Town Board of Carnarvon and a justice of the peace there. He unsuccessfully contested the Glamorgan House of Assembly seat at the 1891 state election.

In 1883, while in London, Woollnough purchased an antique couch from the Kent residence of Napoleon III, which was exhibited at the Hobart Museum and Art Gallery after Woollnough's death. He also donated to the museum an engraving of Sir John Franklin. He purchased the historic Model Prison at Port Arthur in 1889, which he opened for tours, donating the money to the church. He also loaned several further works purchased on an 1889 visit to England to the gallery for some time.

Woollnough was first elected to the House of Assembly at an 1893 by-election in the seat of Sorell, and was then re-elected unopposed in that year's general election. He had been officiating at St David's Cathedral, Hobart at the time of his election. The Queenslander described him at that time as "a Church of England clergyman who is living on his own private means and acts as a kind of bush missionary in the Carnarvon district". As a member of parliament, Woollnough opposed universal male suffrage, opposed taxation increases in general and land tax moreso and opposed the use of unemployed labour for public works, viewing the latter as too costly. He was supportive of Federation, but was defeated for the 1897 Constitutional Convention and unsuccessfully contested a Senate seat at the inaugural 1901 federal election as a Free Trade Party candidate In 1902, he chaired a parliamentary committee investigating possible administrative economies. He also served on the council of the University of Tasmania while in parliament. He retired at the 1903 election after his seat was amalgamated with that of Premier Elliott Lewis in a redistribution. He "expressed regret at having to abandon his political work".

Woollnough remained involved with the church throughout his political career. Following his retirement from politics, he was appointed to the Swansea parish in 1903. He remained a military chaplain with the rank of honorary lieutenant-colonel until he reached the compulsory retirement age in 1904. He was appointed as a clerical member of the Anglican Board of Education in 1905. Woollnough resigned as an Anglican church minister in 1906 after a period of ill health, having been based at Swansea, and retired to Port Arthur, where he lived in the former commandant's residence.

He died in July 1917 in the Brisbane suburb of Sandgate while on a visit to Queensland. The Mercury wrote that he had "used his exceptional gifts in an unusual way to the service of the state".
