= Electoral district of Selby =

Colonial electoral district of Tasmania

The Electoral district of Selby was a single-member electoral district of the Tasmanian House of Assembly. It centred on the town of Lilydale in Tasmania's northeastern region, and extended into what are today considered Launceston's outer eastern suburbs.

The seat was created ahead of the Assembly's first election held in 1856. The east and northeast of the electorate became part of the new seat of Ringarooma at the 1886 election. The seat was abolished at the 1903 election, when it merged with the neighbouring seat of Evandale to form the new seat of North Esk.

== Members for Selby ==
Member	Term
Ronald Gunn	1856–1860
Isaac Sherwin	1860–1866
James Reid Scott	1866–1872
Frederick Innes	1872–1873
David Murray	1873–1877
Thomas Just	1877–1882
Charles Grubb	1882–1885
William Sidebottom	1885–1893
Frank Archer	1893–1902
Thomas Massey	1902–1903
