= Electoral district of Glamorgan =

Former Tasmanian House of Assembly electoral district

The Electoral district of Glamorgan was a single-member electoral district of the Tasmanian House of Assembly. It centred on the town of Swansea in eastern Tasmania, and included Bicheno, Little Swanport and the Freycinet Peninsula. After 1886, the seat extended as far south as Triabunna and Buckland, which had previously been in neighbouring Sorell.

The seat was created ahead of the Assembly's first election held in 1856, and was abolished at the 1903 election, when it was abolished and divided between Cambria to the north, and Sorell to the south.

== Members for Glamorgan ==
Member	Term
Charles Meredith	1856–1861
John Meredith	1861–1862
Charles Meredith	1862–1866
John Meredith	1866–1871
Edward Shaw	1871
John Mitchell	1871–1880
John Lyne	1880–1893
Edward Miles	1893–1899
Frederick Shaw	1899–1903
