= Samuel Sutton (Australian politician) =

Australian politician

Member of the Tasmanian House of Assembly for South Launceston
- In office 22 May 1891 – January 1897 Serving with William Hartnoll
- Preceded by: David Scott
- Succeeded by: Seat abolished

Member of the Tasmanian House of Assembly for Launceston
- In office 4 October 1901 – 2 April 1903
- Preceded by: Alexander Fowler
- Succeeded by: Seat abolished

Personal details
- Born: Samuel John Sutton; 19 April 1836 Hobart, Van Diemen's Land
- Died: 7 September 1906 (aged 70) Launceston, Tasmania

Samuel John Sutton (19 April 1836 – 7 September 1906) was an Australian politician.

Sutton was born in Hobart in Van Diemen's Land in 1836. In 1891 he was elected to the Tasmanian House of Assembly, representing the seat of South Launceston. He was defeated in 1897, but returned in 1901 after winning a by-election for Launceston and serving until 1903 when he was defeated for East Launceston. He died in 1906 in Launceston.

Tasmanian House of Assembly
Preceded by David Scott	Member for South Launceston; 1891–1897; Served alongside: William Hartnoll	Seat abolished
Preceded by Alexander Fowler	Member for Launceston; 1901–1903	Seat abolished
