= Henry Lette =

Australian cricketer and politician

Personal information
- Full name: Henry Elmes Lette
- Born: 10 August 1829; Curramore, Tasmania, Australia
- Died: 15 August 1892 (aged 63); Launceston, Tasmania, Australia
- Bowling: Left-arm

Domestic team information
- Years: Team
- 1851/52: Tasmania

Career statistics
Competition	First-class
Matches	1
Runs scored	2
Batting average	1.00
100s/50s	0/0
Top score	2
Balls bowled	116
Wickets	7
Bowling average	11.57
5 wickets in innings	0
10 wickets in match	0
Best bowling	4/50
Catches/stumpings	1/–
- Source: CricketArchive, 15 August 2010

Henry Elmes Lette (christened 10 August 1829 – 15 August 1892) was an Australian cricketer and politician. His middle name is frequently misreported as "Elms".

== Cricket ==
Lette was a left-arm underarm bowler who played for Tasmania. He was born in Curramore and died in Launceston.

Lette made a single first-class appearance for the side, during the 1851–52 season, against Victoria. From the lower order, he scored 2 runs in the first innings in which he batted, and a duck in the second. Lette bowled 29 overs in the match, taking 7 wickets.

== Politics ==
Lette represented Launceston in the House of Assembly from November 1862, and was Chairman of Committees of the Tasmanian House of Assembly from July 1877 to 1892. Lette represented Central Launceston from 1 September 1871 and North Launceston from 30 May 1877.

== Family ==
Lette married Mary Elizabeth Lansdale Harrison on 8 June 1854. Their children included

- Elizabeth Mary Lette (born 1855) married Francis Bourke on 28 April 1879. Georgina Temperley (1880–1936) was a daughter. She married again, as "Lily Bourke" to George Harrisson of Jericho, Tasmania on 28 June 1890.
- (Frances) Beatrice Lette (1857–1923) married Richard Francis Irvine (died 23 September 1921) on 23 November 1875.
- John Arthur Lette (1861–1928)
- Alfred Ernest Lette (1868–1933)
