= Electoral district of North Esk =

Former Tasmanian Legislative Assembly electoral district

The Electoral district of North Esk was a single-member electoral district of the Tasmanian House of Assembly. It was based near Tasmania's second city of Launceston.

The seat was created in a redistribution ahead of the 1903 state election out of the former seats of Selby and Evandale, and was abolished when the Tasmanian parliament adopted the Hare-Clark electoral model in 1909.

== Members for North Esk ==
Member	Term
John Gibson	1903–1906
Richard McKenzie	1906–1909
