= Electoral district of Evandale =

Former Tasmanian House of Assembly electoral district

The Electoral district of Evandale was a single-member electoral district of the Tasmanian House of Assembly. It centred on the town of Evandale to the south of Launceston.

The seat, created in 1856 under the name Morven, was established under the name Evandale ahead of the 1886 election. The seat was abolished at the 1903 election, when it merged with the neighbouring seat of Selby to form the new seat of North Esk.

== Members for Evandale ==
Member	Term
John Falkiner	1886–1891
John von Stieglitz	1891–1903
