= Electoral district of Devonport =

Former Tasmanian House of Assembly electoral district

The electoral district of Devonport was a single-member electoral district of the Tasmanian House of Assembly. It was based at the town of Devonport on Tasmania's north coast.

The seat was created in a redistribution ahead of the 1897 election out of the abolished seat of East Devon. It was itself abolished when the Tasmanian parliament adopted the Hare-Clark electoral model in 1909. The circumstances of its first two by-elections were initiated when the member for Devonport, John Henry, resigned. At the resulting by-election on 21 June 1898, Ministerial candidate William Aikenhead was elected. However, the election was declared void. In October 1898, the Ministerial member for neighbouring Latrobe, Henry Murray, resigned to contest the resulting Devonport by-election (held on 25 October 1898), whilst Aikenhead contested the now-vacant seat of Latrobe at a by-election on 15 October 1898. Both were successful.

== Members for Devonport ==
Member	Term
John Henry	1897–1898
William Aikenhead	1898–1898
Henry Murray	1898–1900
John Hope	1900–1903
Henry Dumbleton	1903–1906
Don Urquhart	1906–1909
