= Ronald Worthy Giblin =

Australian surveyor and historian

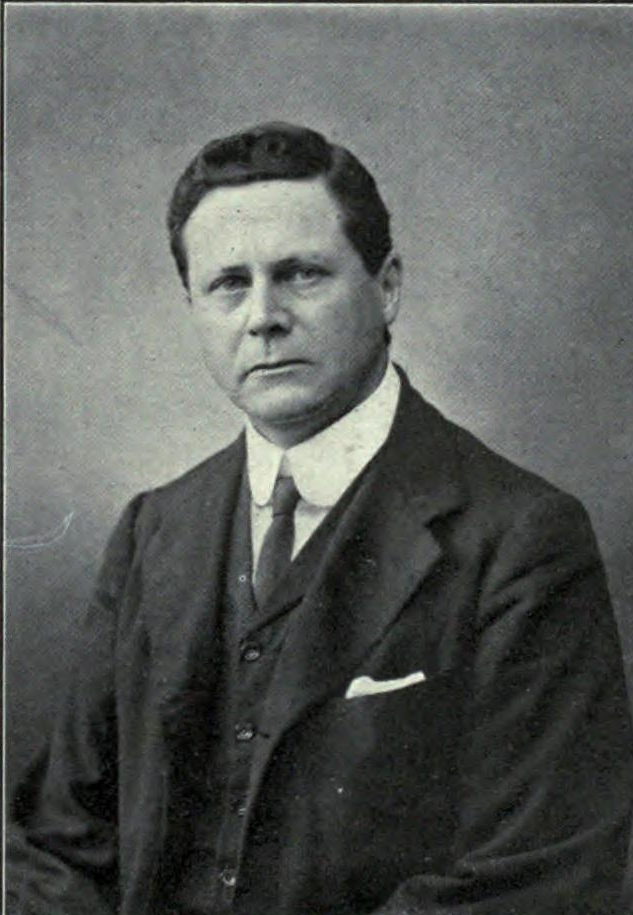

Ronald Worthy Giblin (3 January 1863 – 13 March 1936) was an Australian land surveyor, who worked in Thailand, and is best known as a colonial historian of Tasmania.

Giblin was born in Hobart to banker Thomas and Mary Ann née Worthy. He went to the Hutchins School and obtained a degree in arts in 1879 and joined the Lands Department in Hobart. He was sent to work in the Royal Survey Department in Thailand (Siam) in 1894 and worked there until 1910. He also founded a rubber company in Singapore in 1906. He went to England in 1911 and lived in Cheltenham. In 1921 he was asked to work on the history of Tasmanian settlement by the government of Tasmania. He sought to publish three volumes on the history of Tasmania and published the first volume covering the period from 1642 to 1804 in 1927. His research for the second volume covering 1804 to 1836 was slow due to poor health and he died before it could be completed. Giblin was a Fellow of the Royal Geographical Society and the Royal Colonial Institute.
