= 1900 Tasmanian colonial election =

State election in Australia

- 9 March 1900

All 38 seats in the Tasmanian House of Assembly
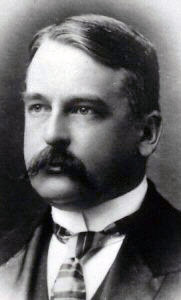

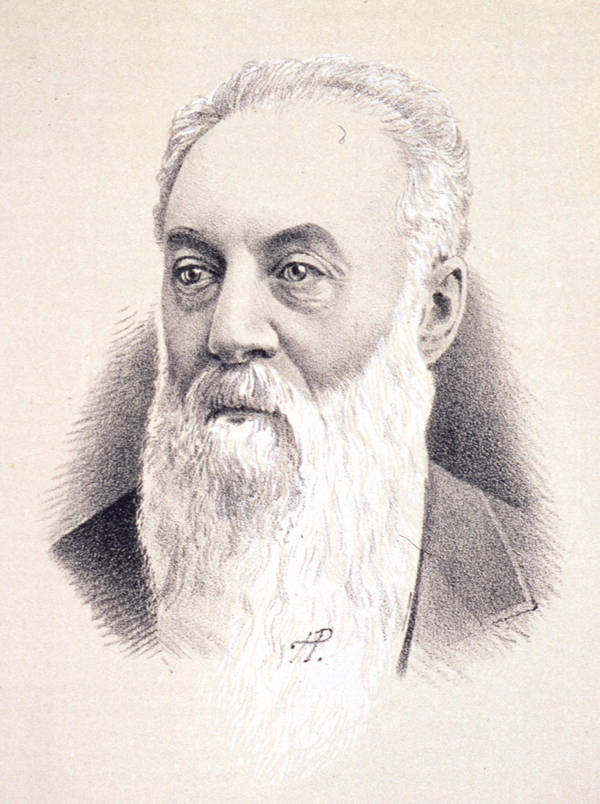
| | First party | Second party |
|---|---|---|
| Leader | Elliott Lewis | Thomas Reibey |
| Party | Free Trade | Protectionist |
| Leader's seat | Richmond | Westbury |
| Last election | 19 seats | 12 seats |
| Seats won | 18 seats | 9 seats |
| Seat change | ▼1 | ▼3 |
Premier before election
Elliott Lewis
Free Trade
Elected Premier
Elliott Lewis
Free Trade

The 1900 Tasmanian colonial election was held on 9 March 1900 in the Australian colony of Tasmania to elect 38 members of the Tasmanian House of Assembly.

The 1900 election was the second to use the Hare-Clark system (single transferable voting) in a limited way. Hobart and Launceston were given 6 and 4 members respectively, who were elected using STV. First past the post was used in single-member constituencies elsewhere in the state. Following this term, the system largely returned to its pre–1897 state (all members elected through first past the post), but at the 1909 election (and up to the present), the entire State was divided into five multi-member electorates and the Hare-Clark system was used to elect every member.

== Results ==
| Party | Votes | % | Seats | +/– |
|---|---|---|---|---|
| Free Trade | 5,134 | 27.20 | 18 | ▼1 |
| Protectionist | 2,218 | 11.75 | 9 | ▼3 |
| Others | 7,319 | 38.78 | 0 | ▼1 |
| Independents | 4,201 | 22.26 | 11 | ▲6 |
| Total | 18,872 | 100.00 | 38 | – |
| Valid votes | 18,872 | 97.38 | | |
| Invalid/blank votes | 508 | 2.62 | | |
| Total votes | 19,380 | 100.00 | | |
| Registered voters/turnout | 39,002 | 49.69 | | |
Source: UWA

Popular vote
| Free Trade Party | 27.20% |
| Protectionist Party | 11.75% |
| Independents | 22.26% |
| Others | 38.78% |

Seats
| Free Trade Party | 47.37% |
| Protectionist Party | 23.68% |
| Independents | 28.95% |

== See also ==
- Members of the Tasmanian House of Assembly, 1900–1903
