= Don Urquhart =

Australian politician

Donald Campbell Urquhart (c. 1848 – 6 August 1911) was an Australian politician.

== Early life ==
He was born in London.

== Political career ==
In 1893, Urquhart was elected to the Tasmanian House of Assembly as the Free Trade member for Cumberland. His election was declared void in December 1893, but in 1894 he won election to the seat of Montagu. Following a redistribution in 1900 he became the member for Zeehan, holding it until he was defeated in 1903. At the 1901 federal election, Urquhart narrowly failed to win election to the Senate, losing the last seat to James Macfarlane by 43 votes (0.2%). He served a final term as the member for Devonport from 1906 until 1909, when he contested Darwin unsuccessfully after the introduction of proportional representation. Urquhart was a minister from 1897 to 1899 and served as Treasurer from 1906 to 1909.
