= Electoral district of Sorell =

Former Tasmanian House of Assembly electoral district

The Electoral district of Sorell was a single-member electoral district of the Tasmanian House of Assembly. Its population centre was the town of Sorell east of Tasmania's capital, Hobart, and included the Tasman Peninsula.

The seat was created ahead of the Assembly's first election held in 1856, and was abolished when the Tasmanian parliament adopted the Hare-Clark electoral model in 1909.

== Members for Sorell ==
| Member | Term |
|---|---|
| Askin Morrison | 1856–1860 |
| George Marshall | 1860–1861 |
| William Hodgson | 1861–1872 |
| James Gunn | 1872–1882 |
| James Gray | 1882–1889 |
| Charles Featherstone | 1889–1893 |
| Joseph Woollnough | 1893–1903 |
| Alexander Hean | 1903–1909 |
