= Electoral district of Launceston =

Former state electoral district of Tasmania, Australia

The electoral district of Launceston was a multi-member electoral district of the Tasmanian House of Assembly. It was based in Tasmania's second city, Launceston, and the surrounding rural area.

The seat was created as a three-member seat ahead of the Assembly's first election held in 1856, and was abolished at the 1871 election, when it was divided up into the seats of Central, North and South Launceston.

At the 1897 election, the Hare-Clark electoral model was trialled in Launceston and Hobart, with Launceston being recreated as a 4-member seat. It continued for two terms, before being broken up again in 1903 into Central, North, East and West Launceston. In 1909, the entire state adopted Hare-Clark, and the Launceston region became part of the Bass division.

== Members for Launceston ==
First incarnation: 1856–1871

Member 1	Term	Member 2	Term	Member 3	Term
John Rogers	1856–1857	Adye Douglas	1856–1857	William Champ	1856–1857
Alexander Clerke	1857–1860	James Matthews	1857–1861	John Crookes	1857–1862
Joseph Cohen	1860–1861	James Matthews	1857–1861	John Crookes	1857–1862
Robert Miller	1861–1866	Henry Dowling	1861–1862	John Crookes	1857–1862
Robert Miller	1861–1866	Henry Lette	1862–1871	D'Arcy Murray	1862–1866
John Crookes	1866–1866	Henry Lette	1862–1871	John Scott	1866–1871
Thomas Chapman	1866–1871	Henry Lette	1862–1871	John Scott	1866–1871

Second incarnation: 1897–1903

Member 1	Term	Member 2	Term	Member 3	Term	Member 4	Term
William Hartnoll	1897–1902	Matthew Clarke	1897–1900	Ronald Smith	1897–1900	Alexander Fowler	1897–1901
William Hartnoll	1897–1902	Robert Sadler	1900–1903	Peter McCrackan	1900–1903	Alexander Fowler	1897–1901
William Hartnoll	1897–1902	Robert Sadler	1900–1903	Peter McCrackan	1900–1903	Samuel Sutton	1901–1903
David Storrer	1902–1903	Robert Sadler	1900–1903	Peter McCrackan	1900–1903	Samuel Sutton	1901–1903
