= John Henry (Australian politician) =

Australian politician (1834–1912)

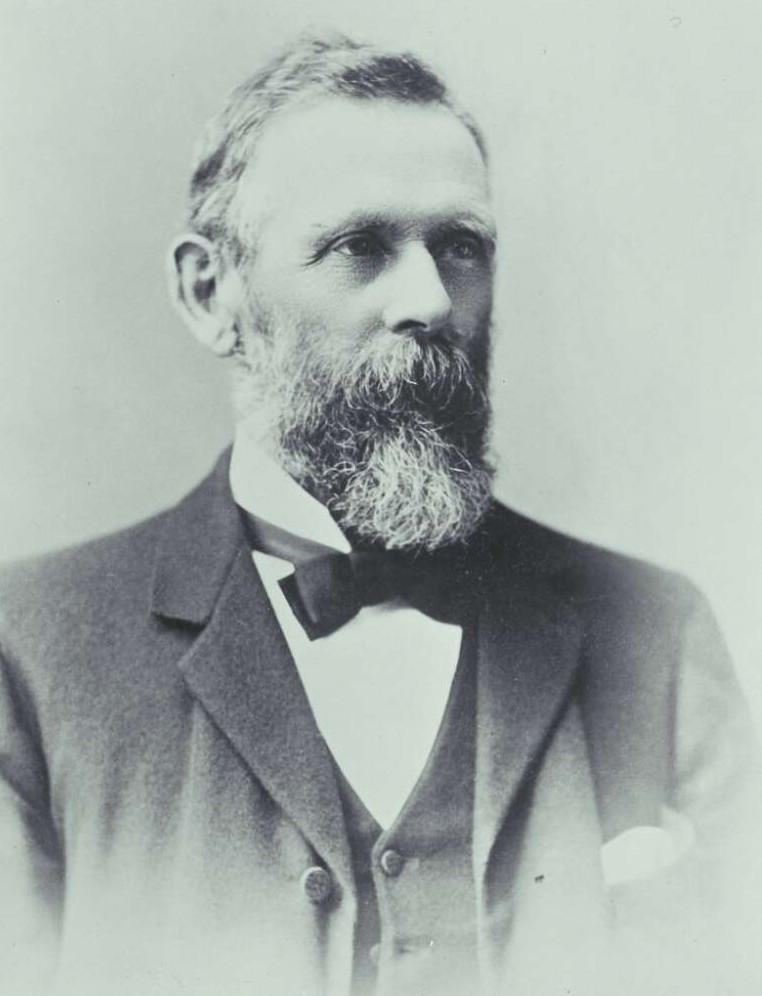
John Henry at the 1898 Australasian Federal Convention.

John Henry CMG (1 September 1834 – 14 September 1912) was an Australian politician, member of the Tasmanian House of Assembly and Treasurer of Tasmania.

Henry was born in Lerwick, Shetland Isles, Scotland, the third of seven sons of John Henderson Henry, a merchant, and his wife Christina, née Henderson. Henry migrated to Melbourne with his father and three brothers in May 1854.

Henry was for a number of years Warden of the Mersey Marine Board. Henry was returned to the House of Assembly for East Devon on 22 May 1891 and after that seat was abolished, was returned for Devonport on 8 January 1897. In August 1892 he accepted office as Treasurer in the Henry Dobson ministry.

He was a director of the Mount Lyell Prospecting Association from 1885.

Henry was a member of the Tasmanian Legislative Council for Mersey from 16 August 1901 until resigning on 18 July 1902. He was appointed CMG in the 1907 Birthday Honours.

Henry died on 14 September 1912 at Devonport, Tasmania; he was survived by his wife, three sons and three daughters. Their second daughter Emily Henry (c. 1869 – 22 September 1930) married cricketer John Savigny on 6 April 1891.
