= Frank Archer (politician) =

Australian politician

Frank Archer (1 November 1846 - 26 May 1902) was a Tasmanian politician and member of the prominent Archer family. He was a member of the Tasmanian House of Assembly from 1893 until his death, representing the electorate of Selby.

Archer was educated at Horton College at Ross. Born into a successful farming family, he was a farmer and merino breeder outside of politics. He purchased "Landfall" at Newnham in c. 1872; he also owned "Burnside" and properties at Point Effingham and Lauriston. He was chairman of the Dorset Road Trust for 21 years, was a Justice of the Peace and local coroner, lay preacher in the Wesleyan Methodist Church, and member of the Esk Rabbit Trust and Invermay Board of Health.

He was first elected to the House of Assembly at the 1893 election and was re-elected in 1897 and 1900. He died suddenly in office while bushwalking between Lilydale and Lisle in May 1902; although he had suffered some heart trouble, he had addressed his constituents at a large public meeting only two days before his death. He was buried at Longford Cemetery.

Archer was from a political family: his brother, uncle, two nephews, four cousins and brother-in-law were all members of the Parliament of Tasmania.
