= Robert C. Patterson (engineer) =

Australian politician (1844–1907)

Robert Charles Patterson (21 March 1844 – 21 June 1907) was an Australian engineer, remembered for his work on railways in three colonies, the Australian Overland Telegraph Line (OTL), and civic works in Tasmania, where he served a term in the House of Assembly.

== History ==
Patterson was born in Melbourne, son of Mary Jane Patterson, a daughter of George Keys of Dandenong, and James Patterson, a merchant, who died around 1850. Mrs Patterson married again, in 1856, to James Jamieson, of County Tyrone, also her birthplace.

He was educated at the Collegiate School, St Kilda, where he won the gold medal in two consecutive semesters in 1857

He went on to King's College, London, where he studied engineering and was articled to William Wilson M. Inst, C.E., of Westminster. Wilson was known for his work on the Victoria Bridge, the first railway bridge over the Thames.

== Railways ==
His articles having expired, he returned to Australia and in 1864 at age 19 was employed by Peto, Brassey & Betts, building a railway from Ipswich to Grandchester. In 1867 he was with Doyne, Major & Willett, (Note: Principals were William Thomas Doyne C.E. (died 29 September 1877), James Major (died 28 February 1875) and Alfred Thomas Willett C.E. (died 24 February 1875); the firm made the newspapers when they filed a libel action against the Tasmanian Times, then W. T. Doyne demolished their own case in cross-examination by self-incrimination.) surveying the Launceston and Western Railway, from Launceston to Deloraine. Patterson later referred to Doyne in complimentary terms.

In 1867 he joined the South Australian public service as assistant engineer to H. C. Mais and in 1869 was promoted to resident engineer and developed a reputation as an authority on railways. During his 18 years in South Australia he progressed from Resident Engineer of Railways, to Chief Assistant Engineer, and finally Deputy Engineer-in-Chief.

In 1870 he reported on construction of the Port Augusta section of the Great Northern Railway. His paper on light railways was read before the Institute of Civil Engineers, London, in 1878 and he was elected a member of the Institute of Civil Engineers, London, in 1880.

== Overland Telegraph ==
In 1871 construction of the northern section of the Overland Telegraph Line was a year behind schedule, so on 3 May Charles Todd's overseer of works, William McMinn, sacked the contractors and sent all their men back to Adelaide. He then commissioned Patterson to appoint his own staff and workers, horses and equipment to pick up where they had left off. It was six months before they were assembled in Darwin. Patterson decided on a new strategy, dividing the remaining length into four sections to be completed concurrently, with most resources concentrated on the most northerly section. Whether he made up the lost time is debatable, as Patterson fared no better than his predecessors in the battle with the seasons and distances, finishing his section eight and a half months late. It was an expensive decision for the South Australian Government, as they not only had the costs incurred by Patterson, but were obliged to pay £11,000 compensation to the original contractors.

He became Government deputy engineer-in-chief in 1880 and did work on jetties and other harbor works.

== Tasmania ==
He returned to Tasmania in 1886 and won the contract for the last section of the line from Bridgewater to Glenora, on the Derwent Valley Railway.

He was chairman of the Metropolitan Drainage Board from its inception in 1891 to his death. He was responsible for Hobart's deep-drainage sewerage.

In 1892 he completed the line from Bellerive to Sorell.

In 1900 he was elected to the Tasmanian House of Assembly as the Free Trade member for Hobart. He transferred to South Hobart in 1903 and left politics in 1904. He briefly led the Opposition from May 1903 to March 1904.

He died following a cerebral haemorrhage which happened during a board meeting at Hobart on 21 June 1907, and his remains were buried in Queenborough Cemetery.

== Family ==
Patterson had a sister Elizabeth Patterson, who married Rev. Samuel Trethewie Withington (died 9 July 1907), on 2 April 1873.

On 16 October 1869 he married Charlotte Elizabeth Ingram, a daughter of Rev. William Ingram, at St John's Church, Adelaide. They had an adopted son (later Dr) James Patterson.

== Publications ==
- R. C. Patterson C.E. (1870) Light Railways, and the Agency to be Employed in their Construction Republished from The Register

== See also ==
- List of South Australian royal commissions 1885: Patterson inquiry board appointed to inquire into certain charges against Mr R. C. Patterson, Deputy Engineer-in-Chief of the S.A. Railways
