= Electoral district of Lyell =

Former electoral district of the Tasmanian House of Assembly

The Electoral district of Lyell was a single-member electoral district of the Tasmanian House of Assembly. It included the towns of Queenstown and Strahan in the West Coast region of Tasmania.

The seat was created in a redistribution in 1899, and was abolished when the Tasmanian parliament adopted the Hare-Clark electoral model in 1909. It was first filled at a by-election on 10 April 1899, notable for being the first occasion on which the Labor Party contested a Tasmanian seat. Its candidate, R. Matthews, gained 40% of the votes

In 1903, Labor's James Long won the seat. At the 1909 election he successfully transferred to the multi-member seat of Darwin (now known as Braddon), but resigned the following year to successfully contest an Australian Senate seat.

== Members for Lyell ==
Member	Party	Term
James Gaffney	Liberal	1899–1903
James Long	Labour	1903–1909
