= Edward Miles (Tasmanian politician) =

Australian politician

Edward Thomas Miles (1849–1944) was a businessman and politician from Van Diemen's Land, who during his long life was variously a merchant seaman, a Free Trade Party Member of the Tasmanian Parliament, a Minister in the Braddon government, and an entrepreneur.

== Life ==
Miles was born in Hobart Town, Van Diemen's Land (Tasmania) in 1849. He worked on ships trading with India, China and South Africa, and after 1879 commanded a series of ships trading the Tasmanian East Coast. He was elected to the Tasmanian lower house of Parliament, the House of Assembly, in December 1893 for the Electoral district of Glamorgan and held that electorate until 1899. In 1900 he successfully contested the Electoral district of Hobart, but resigned after a matter of weeks to pursue business interests. Miles served briefly as Minister for Lands and Works in the Braddon government between May and October in 1899.

After Parliament Miles engaged in a number of business activities, perhaps the most significant of which was the establishment in 1906 of Tongkah Harbour Public Company Limited for tin mining off the west coast of Siam (Thailand) in the Andaman Sea. A monument to Miles was unveiled on Phuket Island in 1969. He retired to Ringwood, Victoria, in 1909, then survived another 35 years.

== Legacy ==
Miles was the grandfather of John Miles, Liberal Party Member of the Legislative Council of Victoria for Templestowe Province from 1985–1992.
