= Henry Murray (Australian politician) =

Australian politician

Henry Murray (2 April 1844 – 16 January 1927) was an Australian politician. He was born at Evandale, Van Diemen's Land. In 1891 he was elected to the Tasmanian House of Assembly as the Free Trade member for East Devon. His seat was abolished in 1897 and he transferred to Latrobe, moving to Devonport in 1898. He was defeated in 1900 but returned to the Assembly via a by-election for Latrobe in 1902. Although he briefly left his party he was a Liberal when he retired in 1909.
