= Charles Hoggins =

Australian politician

Charles Davenport Hoggins (27 May 1862 – 28 April 1923) was an Australian politician.

He was born in Hobart. In 1898 he was elected to the Tasmanian House of Assembly as the member for Hobart. He lost his seat in March 1900 but returned in December, serving until April 1903. His last appearance in politics was when he was elected to the multi-member seat of Denison as a Nationalist in 1917 following a recount caused by Walter Woods's resignation. He was defeated in 1919 and died in 1923 in Sorell.
