= Houston (disambiguation) =

Houston is the largest city in the U.S.'s State of Texas.

Houston may also refer to:

== Places ==
=== United States ===
- Houston, Alabama, an unincorporated community
- Houston, Alaska, a city
- Houston, Arkansas, a town
- Houston, Delaware, a town
- Houston, Florida, a place in Suwannee County
- Houston, Georgia, an unincorporated community
- Houston, Indiana, an unincorporated community
- Houston, Minnesota, a city
- Houston, Mississippi, a city
- Houston, Missouri, a city
- Houston, Nebraska, an unincorporated community
- Houston, North Carolina, an unincorporated community
- Houston, Ohio, an unincorporated community
- Houston, Pennsylvania, a borough
- Houston, Tennessee, an unincorporated community
- Lake Houston, Texas, a reservoir and primary municipal water supply for the city of Houston
- North Houston (disambiguation)
- Houston County (disambiguation)
- Houston station (disambiguation)
- Houston Street (disambiguation)
- Houston Township (disambiguation)

=== Elsewhere ===
- Houston, British Columbia, a town in Canada
- Houston, Renfrewshire, a village in Scotland

== People ==
- Sam Houston (1793–1863), Texan politician and statesman, for whom the city of Houston, Texas was named
- Whitney Houston (1963–2012), American singer and actress
- Houston (surname)
- Houston (given name)
- Clan Houston, a Scottish clan
- Houston (actress), American pornographic actress
- Houston (singer), R&B singer Houston Edward Summers IV (born 1983)
- William J. Houston, American Director of the Naval Nuclear Propulsion Program

== Music ==
- Houston (album), a 1965 album by Dean Martin
  - "Houston" (song), a track on the album written by Lee Hazlewood
- Houston (I'm Comin' to See You), 1974 album by Glen Campbell, with corresponding song as its lead track
- "Houston (Means I'm One Day Closer to You)", a 1983 song by Larry Gatlin and The Gatlin Brothers Band
- "Houston", a song from the 1998 album El Oso by Soul Coughing
- "Houston", a 2008 song from Accelerate by R.E.M.
- "Houston", a 2008 song by Snob Scrilla

== Schools ==
- University of Houston, Houston, Texas
  - Houston Cougars, the athletic teams for the university
- Houston Baptist University, Houston Texas
  - Houston Baptist Huskies, the athletic teams for the university
- Houston Community College, in several Texas cities
- Houston High School (disambiguation)
- Houston Academy for International Studies, Houston, Texas

== Tournaments ==
- Shell Houston Open, a golf tournament on the PGA Tour
- Houston Open (early PGA Tour), played from 1922 to 1938
- Houston Open (darts)

== Other uses ==
- USS Houston, various US Navy ships
- Houston's Restaurant, a steakhouse chain
- Houston instruments, a company
- Houston, the radio call sign for NASA's Christopher C. Kraft Jr. Mission Control Center
- "Houston, we have a problem", a quote by astronaut Jack Swigert
- The Houstons: On Our Own, a 2012 American documentary television series about Whitney Houston's family

== See also ==
- Lucy, Lady Houston (1857–1936), British philanthropist, suffragette and political activist
- Heuston, a surname
- Hoston, Trøndelag, a village in Trøndelag county, Norway
- Houstoun, a surname
- Huston (disambiguation)
