= Hueston =

Hueston is a surname. Notable people with the surname include:

- Kinsale Hueston (born 2000), also known as Kinsale Drake, Native American poet, playwright, performer, and writer
- William Clarence Hueston Sr. (1880–1961), American lawyer, magistrate, and community leader.

== See also ==
- Matthew Hueston House, historic building in Ohio, U.S.
- Morgan–Hueston House, historic building in Ohio, U.S.
- Heuston, another surname
