= H-dropping =

Process of not pronouncing an "h" sound

H-dropping or aitch-dropping is the deletion of the voiceless glottal fricative or "H-sound", [h]. The phenomenon is common in many dialects of English, and is also found in certain other languages, either as a purely historical development or as a contemporary difference between dialects. Although common in most regions of England and in some other English-speaking countries, and linguistically speaking a neutral evolution in languages, H-dropping is often stigmatized as a sign of careless or uneducated speech, due to its strong association with the lower class.

The reverse phenomenon, H-insertion or H-adding, is found in certain situations, sometimes as an allophone or hypercorrection by H-dropping speakers, and sometimes as a spelling pronunciation or out of perceived etymological correctness. A particular example of this is the spread of 'haitch' for 'aitch'.

== In English ==
=== Historical /h/-loss ===
In Old English phonology, the sounds [h], [x], and [ç] (described respectively as glottal, velar and palatal voiceless fricatives) are taken to be allophones of a single phoneme /h/. This phoneme occurred at the start of syllables, alone or clustered with an approximant, and in coda position. The [h] sound appeared in most onsets (except those with an /h/ and /w/ cluster, which had [x]) and the other two allophones in syllable codas ([x] after back vowels and [ç] after front vowels).

The instances of /h/ in coda position were lost during the Middle English and Early Modern English periods, although they are still reflected in the spelling of words such as taught (now pronounced like taut) and weight (now pronounced in most accents like wait). Most of the initial clusters involving /h/ also disappeared (see H-cluster reductions). As a result, in the standard varieties of Modern English, the only position in which /h/ can occur is at the start of a syllable, either alone (as in hat, house, behind, etc.), in the cluster /hj/ (as in huge), or (for a minority of speakers) in the cluster /hw/ (as in whine if pronounced differently from wine). The usual realizations of the latter two clusters are [ç] and [ʍ] (see English phonology).

=== Contemporary H-dropping ===
The phenomenon of H-dropping considered as a feature of contemporary English is the omission, in certain accents and dialects, of this syllable-initial /h/, either alone or in the cluster /hj/. (For the cluster /hw/ and its reduction, see Pronunciation of English ⟨wh⟩.)

==== Description ====
H-dropping, in certain accents and dialects of Modern English, causes words like harm, heat, home and behind to be pronounced arm, eat, ome and be-ind (though in some dialects an [h] may appear in behind to prevent hiatus – see below).

Cases of H-dropping occur in all English dialects in the weak forms of function words like he, him, her, his, had, and have. The pronoun it is a product of historical H-dropping – the older hit survives as an emphatic form in a few dialects such as Southern American English, and in the Scots language. Because the /h/ of unstressed have is usually dropped, the word is usually pronounced /əv/ in phrases like should have, would have, and could have. These can be spelled out in informal writing as "should've", "would've", and "could've". Because /əv/ is also the weak form of the word of, these words are often erroneously spelled as should of, would of and could of.

==== History ====
There is evidence of h-dropping in texts from the 13th century and later. It may originally have arisen through contact with the Norman language, where h-dropping also occurred. Puns which rely on the possible omission of the /h/ sound can be found in works by William Shakespeare and in other Elizabethan era dramas. It is suggested that the phenomenon probably spread from the middle to the lower orders of society, first taking hold in urban centers. It started to become stigmatized, being seen as a sign of poor education, in the 16th or 17th century.

==== Geographical distribution ====
H-dropping in the English language in England (based on Upton and Widdowson, 2006). Dialects in the regions marked no /h/ feature (variable) H-dropping, while those in the regions marked /h/ generally do not, although there is some local variation within these regions.

H-dropping occurs (variably) in most of the dialects of the English language in England and Welsh English, including Cockney, West Country English, West Midlands English (including Brummie), East Midlands English, most of northern England (including Yorkshire and Lancashire), and Cardiff English. It is not generally found in Scottish English and Irish English. It is also typically absent in certain regions of England and Wales, including Northumberland, East Anglia and parts of North and West Wales.

H-dropping also occurs in some Jamaican English, and perhaps in other Caribbean English (including some of The Bahamas). It is not generally found in North American English, although it has been reported in Newfoundland (outside the Avalon Peninsula). However, dropping of /h/ from the cluster /hj/ (so that human is pronounced /'juːmən/) is found in some American dialects, as well as in parts of Ireland – see reduction of /hj/.

==== Social distribution and stigmatization ====
H-dropping, in the countries and regions in which it is prevalent, occurs mainly in working-class accents. Studies have shown it to be significantly more frequent in lower than in higher social groups. It is not a feature of RP (the prestige accent of England), or even of "Near-RP", a variant of RP that includes some regional features. This does not always apply, however, to the dropping of /h/ in weak forms of words like his and her.

H-dropping in English is widely stigmatized, being perceived as a sign of poor or uneducated speech, and discouraged by schoolteachers. John Wells writes that it seems to be "the single most powerful pronunciation shibboleth in England."

==== Use and status of the H-sound in H-dropping dialects ====
In fully H-dropping dialects, that is, in dialects without a phonemic /h/, the sound [h] may still occur but with uses other than distinguishing words. An epenthetic [h] may be used to avoid hiatus, so that for example the egg is pronounced the hegg. It may also be used when any vowel-initial word is emphasized, so that horse /ˈɔːs/ (assuming the dialect is also non-rhotic) and ass /ˈæs/ may be pronounced [ˈˈhɔːs] and [ˈˈhæs] in emphatic utterances. That is, [h] has become an allophone of the zero onset in these dialects.

For many H-dropping speakers, however, a phonological /h/ appears to be present, even if it is not usually realized – that is, they know which words "should" have an /h/, and have a greater tendency to pronounce an [h] in those words than in other words beginning with a vowel. Insertion of [h] may occur as a means of emphasis, as noted above, and also as a response to the formality of a situation. Sandhi phenomena may also indicate a speaker's awareness of the presence of an /h/ – for example, some speakers might say "a edge" (rather than "an edge") for a hedge, and might omit the linking R before an initial vowel resulting from a dropped H.

It is likely that the phonemic system of children in H-dropping areas lacks a /h/ entirely, but that social and educational pressures lead to the incorporation of an (inconsistently realized) /h/ into the system by the time of adulthood.

=== H-insertion ===
The opposite of H-dropping, called H-insertion or H-adding, sometimes occurs as a hypercorrection in English accents that typically drop H. It is commonly noted in literature from late Victorian times to the early 20th century that some lower-class people consistently drop h in words that should have it, while adding h to words that should not have it. An example from the musical My Fair Lady is, "In 'Artford, 'Ereford, and 'Ampshire, 'urricanes 'ardly hever 'appen". Another is in C. S. Lewis's The Magician's Nephew: "Three cheers for the Hempress of Colney 'Atch". In practice, however, it would appear that h-adding is more of a stylistic prosodic effect, being found in highly emphasized words, regardless of whether those words are h-initial or vowel-initial in the standard language.

Some English words borrowed from French may begin with the letter ⟨h⟩ but not with the sound /h/. Examples include heir, and, in many regional pronunciations, hour, hono(u)r and honest. In some cases, spelling pronunciation has introduced the sound /h/ into such words, as in humble, human, hotel and (for most speakers) historic. Spelling pronunciation has also added /h/ to the British English pronunciation of herb, /hɜːb/, while American English retains the older pronunciation /ərb/. Etymology may also serve as a motivation for H-addition, as in the words horrible, habit and harmony: these were borrowed into Middle English from French without an /h/ (orrible, abit, armonie), but as all three derive from Latin words with an /h/, they would later acquired an /h/ in English as an etymological "correction". The name of the letter H itself, "aitch", is subject to H-insertion in some dialects, where it is pronounced "haitch". (In Hiberno-English, "haitch" is frequent amongst Roman Catholics, consistent with their not being H-dropping dialects and distinguishing them from their Protestant neighbours.) Various dialects of Newfoundland English exhibit the same pattern.

=== List of homophones resulting from H-dropping ===
The following is a list of some pairs of English words which may become homophones when H-dropping occurs. (To view the list, click "show".) See also the list of H-dropping homophones in Wiktionary.

Homophonous pairs
/h/	/∅/	IPA	Notes
ha	ah	ˈɑː	
habit	abbot	ˈæbət	With weak vowel merger.
hacked	act	ˈækt	
hacks	axe; ax	ˈæks	
had	ad	ˈæd	
had	add	ˈæd	
hail	ail	ˈeɪl	
hail	ale	ˈeɪl	With pane-pain merger.
Haim	aim	ˈeɪm	
hair	air	ˈɛə(r), ˈeɪr	
hair	ere	ˈɛə(r)	With pane-pain merger.
hair	heir	ˈɛə(r), ˈeɪr	
haired	erred	ˈɛə(r)d	With pane-pain merger.
Hal	Al	ˈæl	
hale	ail	ˈeɪl	With pane-pain merger.
hale	ale	ˈeɪl, ˈeːl	
hall	all	ˈɔːl	
halter	alter	ˈɔːltə(r)	
ham	am	ˈæm	
hand	and	ˈænd	
hanker	anchor	ˈæŋkə(r)	
hap	app	ˈæp	
hare	air	ˈɛə(r)	With pane-pain merger.
hare	ere	ˈɛə(r), ˈeːr	
hare	heir	ˈɛə(r)	With pane-pain merger.
hark	arc	ˈɑː(r)k	
hark	ark	ˈɑː(r)k	
harm	arm	ˈɑː(r)m	
hart	art; Art	ˈɑː(r)t	
has	as	ˈæz	
hash	ash	ˈæʃ	
haste	aced	ˈeɪst, ˈeːst	
hat	at	ˈæt	
hate	ate	ˈeɪt	
hate	eight	ˈeɪt	With pane-pain merger and wait-weight merger.
haul	all	ˈɔːl	
haunt	aunt	ˈɑːnt	With trap-bath split and father-bother merger.
hawk	auk	ˈɔːk	
hawk	orc	ˈɔːk	In non-rhotic accents.
hay	A	ˈeɪ	
hay	eh	ˈeɪ	
he	E	ˈiː	
head	Ed	ˈɛd	
heady	Eddie	ˈɛdi	
heady	eddy	ˈɛdi	
heal	eel	ˈiːl	With fleece merger or meet-meat merger.
hear	ear	ˈɪə(r), ˈiːr	
heard	erred	ˈɜː(r)d, ˈɛrd	
hearing	earing	ˈɪərɪŋ, ˈiːrɪŋ	
hearing	earring	ˈɪərɪŋ	
heart	art; Art	ˈɑː(r)t	
heat	eat	ˈiːt	
heathen	even	ˈiːvən	With th-fronting.
heather	ever	ˈɛvə(r)	With th-fronting.
heave	eve; Eve	ˈiːv	
heave	eave	ˈiːv	
heaven	Evan	ˈɛvən	
heaving	even	ˈiːvən	With weak vowel merger and G-dropping.
hedge	edge	ˈɛdʒ	
heel	eel	ˈiːl	
heinous	anus	ˈeɪnəs	With pane-pain merger.
heist	iced	ˈaɪst	
Helen	Ellen	ˈɛlən	
Helena	Eleanor	ˈɛlənə	In non-rhotic accents.
Helena	Elena	ˈɛlənə	
hell	L; el; ell	ˈɛl	
he'll	eel	ˈiːl	
helm	elm	ˈɛlm	
hem	M; em	ˈɛm	
hen	N; en	ˈɛn	
herd	erred	ˈɜː(r)d, ˈɛrd	
here	ear	ˈɪə(r), ˈiːr	
here's	ears	ˈɪəz, ˈiːrz	
heron	Erin	ˈɛrən	With weak vowel merger.
herring	Erin	ˈɛrən	With weak vowel merger and G-dropping.
he's	E's	ˈiːz	
Heuston	Euston	ˈjuːstən	
hew	ewe	ˈjuː, ˈ(j)ɪu	
hew	yew	ˈjuː, ˈjɪu	
hew	you	ˈjuː	
hews	ewes	ˈjuːz, ˈ(j)ɪuz	
hews	use	ˈjuːz, ˈjɪuz	
hews	yews	ˈjuːz, ˈjɪuz	
hex	ex	ˈɛks	
hex	X; ex	ˈɛks	
hey	A	ˈeɪ	
hey	eh	ˈeɪ	
hi	aye; ay	ˈaɪ	
hi	eye	ˈaɪ	
hi	I	ˈaɪ	
hid	id	ˈɪd	
hide	I'd	ˈaɪd	
high	aye; ay	ˈaɪ	
high	eye	ˈaɪ	
high	I	ˈaɪ	
higher	ire	ˈaɪə(r)	
hike	Ike	ˈaɪk	
hill	ill	ˈɪl	
hinky	inky	ˈɪŋki	
hire	ire	ˈaɪə(r), ˈaɪr	
his	is	ˈɪz	
hit	it	ˈɪt	
hitch	itch	ˈɪtʃ	
hive	I've	ˈaɪv	
hoard	awed	ˈɔːd	In non-rhotic accents with horse-hoarse merger.
hoard	oared	ˈɔː(r)d, ˈoə(r)d, ˈoːrd	
hoarder	order	ˈɔː(r)də(r)	With horse-hoarse merger.
hocks	ox	ˈɒks	
hoe	O	ˈoʊ, ˈoː	
hoe	oh	ˈoʊ, ˈoː	
hoe	owe	ˈoʊ	With toe-tow merger.
hoes	O's	ˈoʊz, ˈoːz	
hoister	oyster	ˈɔɪstə(r)	
hold	old	ˈoʊld	
holed	old	ˈoʊld	With toe-tow merger.
holly	Olly	ˈɒli	
hone	own	ˈoʊn	With toe-tow merger.
hop	op	ˈɒp	
hopped	opped	ˈɒpt	
hopped	opt	ˈɒpt	
horde	awed	ˈɔːd	In non-rhotic accents.
horde	oared	ˈɔː(r)d, ˈoə(r)d, ˈoːrd	
horn	awn	ˈɔːn	In non-rhotic accents.
horn	on	ˈɔːn	In non-rhotic accents with lot-cloth split.
hotter	otter	ˈɒtə(r)	
how	ow	ˈaʊ	
howl	owl	ˈaʊl	
how're	hour	ˈaʊə(r), ˈaʊr	
how're	our	ˈaʊə(r), ˈaʊr	
Houston	Euston	ˈjuːstən	
Hoyle	oil	ˈɔɪl	
hue	ewe	ˈjuː, ˈ(j)ɪuː	
hue	U	ˈjuː, ˈ(j)ɪuː	
hue	yew	ˈjuː, ˈjɪuː	
hue	you	ˈjuː	
hues	ewes	ˈjuːz, ˈ(j)ɪuz	
hues	U's	ˈjuːz, ˈ(j)ɪuz	
hues	use	ˈjuːz, ˈjɪuz	
hues	yews	ˈjuːz, ˈjɪuz	
Hugh	ewe	ˈjuː, ˈ(j)ɪuː	
Hugh	U	ˈjuː, ˈ(j)ɪuː	
Hugh	yew	ˈjuː, ˈjɪuː	
Hugh	you	ˈjuː	
Hughes	ewes	ˈjuːz, ˈ(j)ɪuz	
Hughes	U's	ˈjuːz, ˈ(j)ɪuz	
Hughes	use	ˈjuːz, ˈjɪuz	
Hughes	yews	ˈjuːz, ˈjɪuz	
hurl	earl	ˈɜː(r)l	With fern-fir-fur merger.
Huston	Euston	ˈjuːstən	
Hyde	I'd	ˈaɪd	
whore	awe	ˈɔː	In non-rhotic accents with horse-hoarse merger and pour-poor merger.
whore	oar	ˈɔː(r), ˈoə(r), ˈoːr	With pour-poor merger.
whore	or	ˈɔː(r)	With horse-hoarse merger and pour-poor merger.
whore	ore	ˈɔː(r), ˈoə(r), ˈoːr	With pour-poor merger.
whored	awed	ˈɔːd	In non-rhotic accents with horse-hoarse merger and pour-poor merger.
whored	oared	ˈɔː(r)d, ˈoə(r)d, ˈoːrd	With pour-poor merger.
who's	ooze	ˈuːz	
who's	Ouse	ˈuːz	
whose	ooze	ˈuːz	
whose	Ouse	ˈuːz	

== In other languages ==
Processes of H-dropping have occurred in various languages at certain times, and in some cases, they remain as distinguishing features between dialects, as in English. Some Dutch dialects, especially the southern ones, feature H-dropping. The dialects of Zeeland, West and East Flanders, most of Antwerp and Flemish Brabant, and the west of North Brabant have lost /h/ as a phonemic consonant but use [h] to avoid hiatus and to signal emphasis, much as in the H-dropping dialects of English. H-dropping is also found in some North Germanic languages, for instance Elfdalian and the dialect of Roslagen, where it is found already in Old East Norse. Also the Low Saxon speaking area around Zwolle, Kampen, Steenwijk, Meppel and Hoogeveen have h-dropping, the former island of Urk has it too as do some regions in Groningen.

When dealing with Greek, this process is called psilosis. The phoneme /h/ in Ancient Greek of Classical Athens, occurring predominantly at the beginnings of words and originally written with the letter H and later as a rough breathing, had been lost by that period in most Ionic dialects and from all Greek dialects during the late Hellenistic/Roman era. Hence it not a phoneme of Modern Greek being approximated in foreign loanwords by /x/ or /ç/ (or /∅/).

The phoneme /h/ was lost in Vulgar Latin, the ancestor of the modern Romance languages. Already in the Imperial period, there is attested evidence for early h-loss. French, Spanish, and Romanian acquired a new initial /h/ in medieval times, but they were later lost in the first two languages in a "second round" of H-dropping. Some varieties of Spanish have yet again acquired [h] from /x/ (from earlier retraction of /ʃ/ and /ʒ/), which as of now is stable. Brazilian Portuguese acquired [h] from /ʁ/ which is now the stable form in most of the country, though it has other allophones.

It is hypothesized in the laryngeal theory that the loss of [h] or similar sounds played a role in the early development of the Indo-European languages.

In Maltese, /h/ existed as a phoneme until the 19th century. It was then lost in most positions, sometimes lengthening the adjacent vowel. Chiefly word-finally it was merged with /ħ/. The latter phoneme, in turn, may now be pronounced [h] by some speakers, chiefly in the syllable onset.

Modern Hebrew is in the process of losing /h/; the phoneme is either replaced by /ʔ/ (word-initially) or entirely absent (in all other positions) in the speech of contemporary young speakers.

In Tagalog, /h/ is sometimes elided into an immediately succeeding vowel, such as huwag from /huˈwaɡ/ to /ˈwaɡ/ and sabihin from /saˈbihin/ to /saˈbin/.

Many dialects of Persian spoken in Afghanistan (i.e. Dari) do not realize the phoneme /h/, except in high-prestige literary words or in hyper formal speech. The deletion of the phoneme /h/ may cause a preceding short vowel to be reinterpreted as a long vowel, likely due to phonological rules in Dari prohibiting short vowels and long vowels from being equal in length. For example, قهر (qahr /qahɾ/, "anger") is often realized as qār /qɑːɾ/ (as if it was written like قار), and فهمیدن (fahmīdan /fahmiːdan/, to understand) is often realized as فامیدن (fāmīdan /fɑːmiːdan/). Between vowels, the phoneme /h/ may be replaced by a glide (/j/ or /w/) resulting in words like خواهش (x(w)āhiš /xɑːhɪʃ/, "I want") being realized as خایش (xāyš /xɑːjʃ/) or, in dialects that no longer distinguish āy and ay, this may be further reduced to xayš /xajʃ/ (as if spelt خیش).

The modern Javanese language typically does not have initial and intervocalic /h/ in its native words, except between the same vowels. For instance, in modern Javanese, the word for "rain" is udan, from Old Javanese hudan, which ultimately comes from Proto-Austronesian *quzaN. The letter "ꦲ" in traditional Javanese script, which had the value /ha/ in Old Javanese is now used in most cases to represent /a/ and /ɔ/ in its base form. In modern Javanese, initial and intervocalic /h/ appears only in loanwords from Indonesian and English. Since the Javanese people have been exposed to Dutch for far longer than they are with Indonesian or standard literary Malay (which only started somewhere after 1900 and amplified after 1945, excluding Surinamese Javanese), many of the words borrowed from Dutch have also lost the phoneme, such as andhuk /aɳˈɖ̥(ʰ)ʊʔ/ "towel" from Dutch handdoek.

== See also ==
- Phonological history of English
- Phonological history of English consonants
- Aspirated h
