= Houston Street (disambiguation) =

Houston Street a major east–west thoroughfare in New York City, U.S.

Houston Street may also refer to:

== Streets ==
All in the United States

- Houston Street, now 2nd Street (Augusta), Georgia
- Houston Street (Dallas), Texas
- Houston Street (San Antonio), Texas
- Houston Street (Savannah, Georgia)

== Subway stations ==
All in New York City, U.S.

- Houston Street station (IND Second Avenue Line), a proposed station
- Houston Street station (IRT Broadway–Seventh Avenue Line), opened 1918
- Houston Street station (IRT Ninth Avenue Line), operated 1873–1940
- Houston Street station (IRT Third Avenue Line), operated 1878–1955

== See also ==
- Houston station (disambiguation)
- Houston Street Ferry, a former ferry in New York City, U.S.
- Houston Street Line (disambiguation)
- Houston (disambiguation)
- Huston Street
