= AK-1 =

AK-1, AK1 or AK 1 may refer to:

- USS Houston (AK-1), a 1903 cargo ship
- Alaska Route 1, a state highway
- AK1 (gene), which encodes Adenylate kinase 1
- Aleksandrov-Kalinin AK-1, a 1920s Soviet prototype aeroplane
- Butte Municipal Airport, FAA location identifier AK1
