= Inland Petroleum Distribution System =

Fuel infrastructure of the US military

The Inland Petroleum Distribution System (IPDS) a rapid deployment, general support, bulk fuel storage and pipeline system designed to move bulk fuel forward in a theater of operations. The system has a design throughput of 720,000 US gallons (2,700,000 L) per day based on 600 US gallons (2,300 L) per minute at 20 hours per operational day. The IPDS system has three primary subsystems: tactical petroleum terminal, pipeline segments, and pump stations.

The IPDS was designed by and for the U.S. Army and U.S. Marine Corps for use with the U.S. Navy Offshore Petroleum Distribution System (OPDS). OPDS tankers are the SS Mount Washington, SS American Osprey, SS Petersburg, and SS Chesapeake.
