= Exercise Valiant Shield =

Series of United States military war games in the Pacific Ocean since 2006

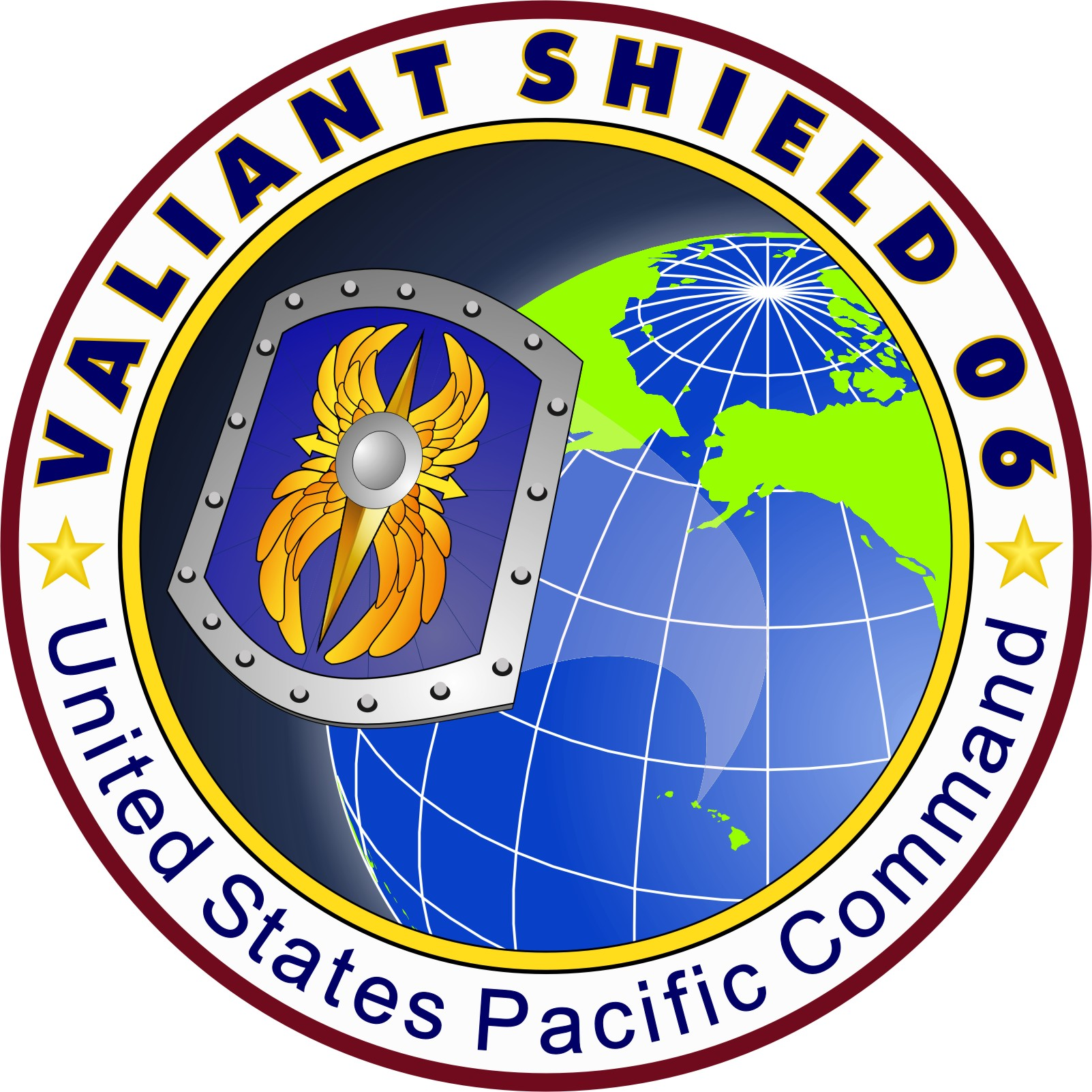
Official Seal of Valiant Shield 2006

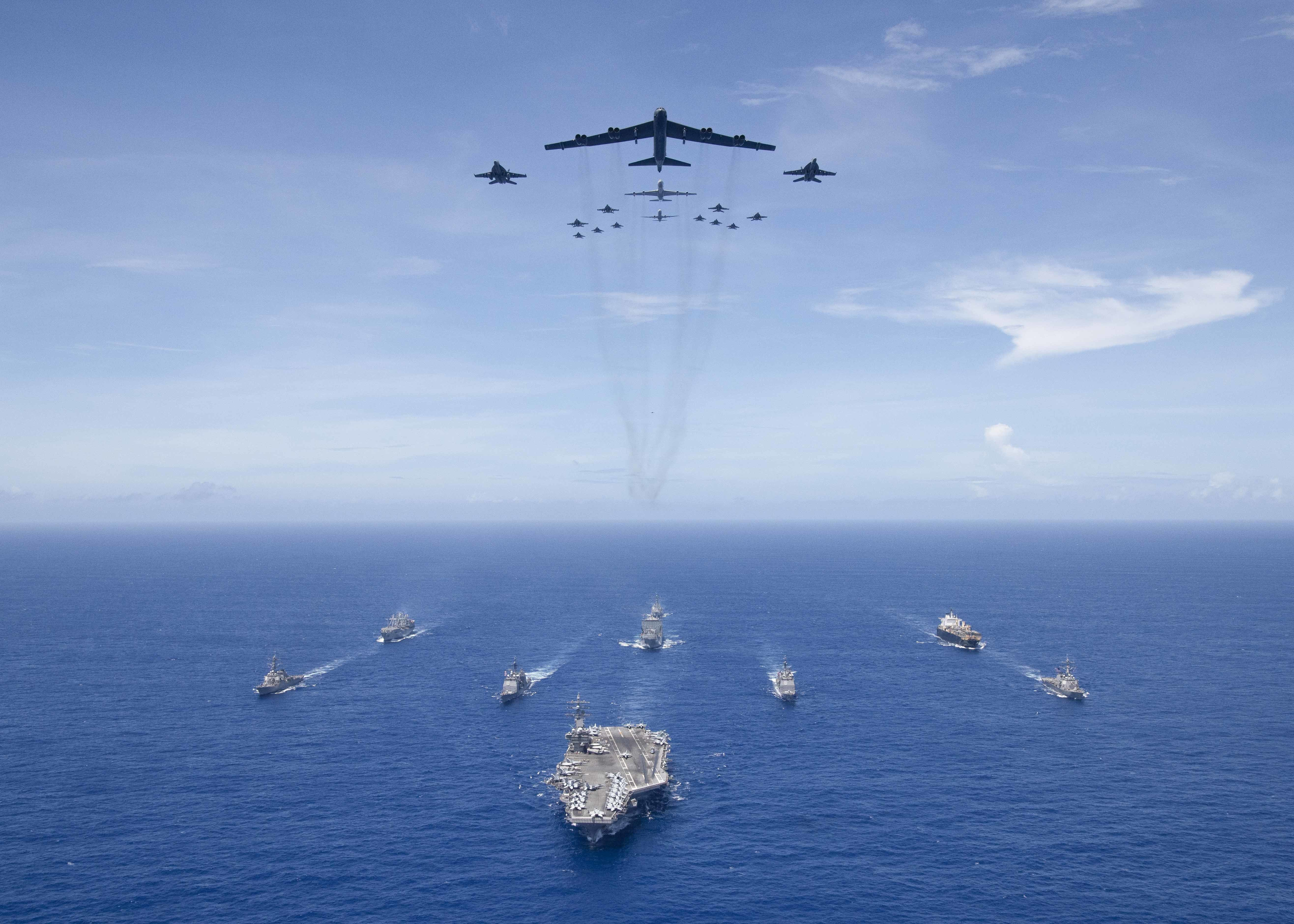
B-52 and F/A-18 aircraft flying over the Carrier Strike Group Five during Valiant Shield 2018

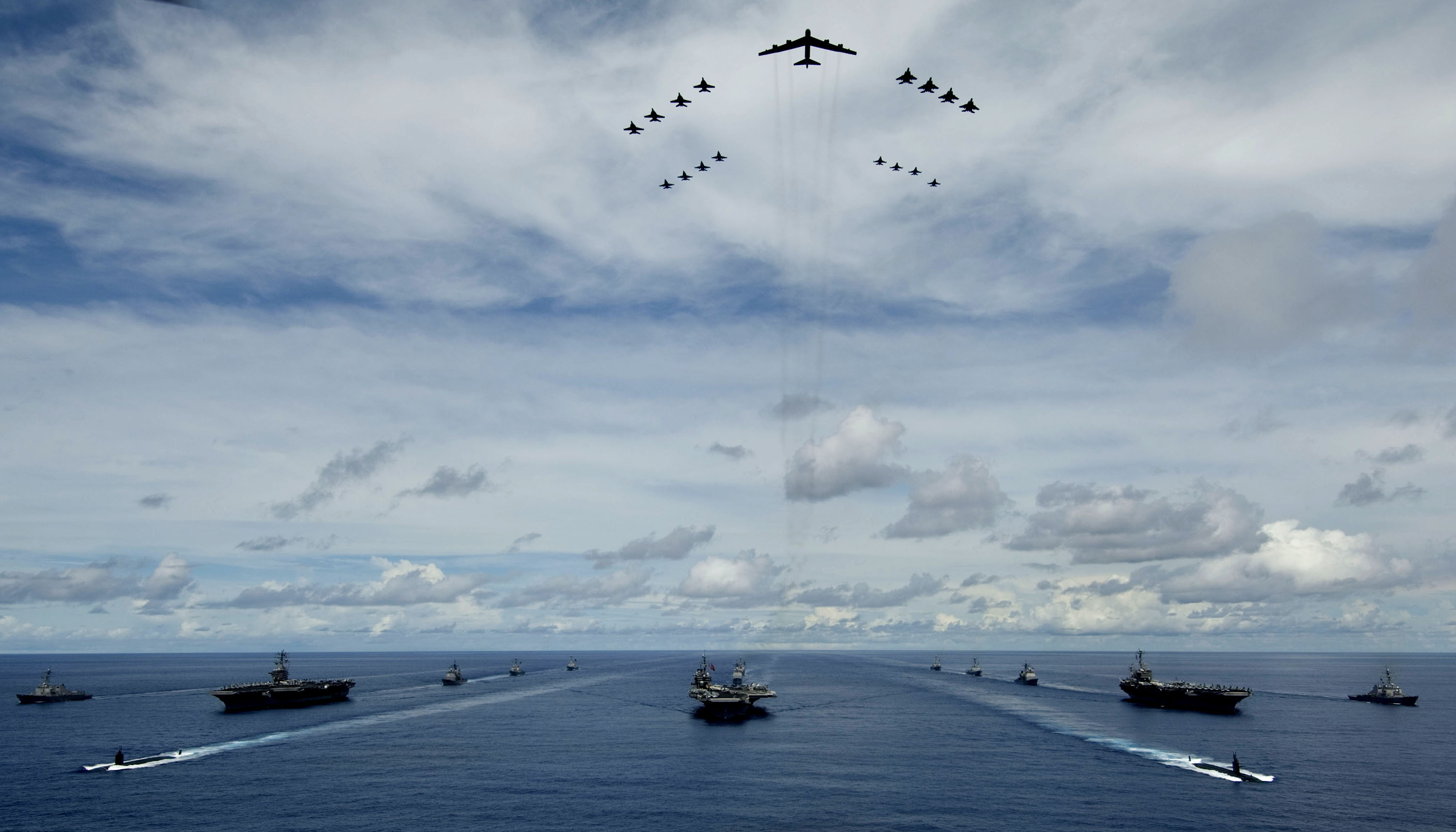
A B-52 Stratofortress leads a formation of Air Force and Navy F-16 Fighting Falcons, F-15 Eagles, and F-18 Hornets over the USS Kitty Hawk, USS Nimitz and USS John C. Stennis Strike Groups during Valiant Shield 2007.

Exercise Valiant Shield is one of the largest United States military war games held in the Pacific Ocean. Nine Valiant Shield exercises were conducted between 2006 and 2022. According to the Navy, Valiant Shield focuses on cooperation between military branches and on the detection, tracking, and engagement of units at sea, in the air, and on land in response to a wide range of missions.

The first exercise in 2006 involved 22,000 personnel, 280 aircraft, and 30 ships, including the supercarriers USS Kitty Hawk, USS Abraham Lincoln, and USS Ronald Reagan. It was the largest military exercise to be conducted by the United States in Pacific waters since the Vietnam War, and it was also the first time observers from the People's Republic of China were allowed to view U.S. wargames. The exercise marked the first of what will become biennial exercises involving different branches of the U.S. military.

Valiant Shield 2006 included Navy, Air Force, Marine Corps, and Coast Guard units. Air operations included thousands of sorties as well as in-air refuelings and parachute deployments. Aircraft from Valiant Shield deployed on missions ranging across the Pacific all the way to Alaska. Ships simulated anti-submarine warfare. Valiant Shield 2006 was the first time that three carrier strike groups had operated together in the Pacific in over ten years. Forces exercised a wide range of skills, including maritime interdiction; defense counter-air; intelligence, surveillance and reconnaissance; and command and control.

== Observers ==
Observers from China at Andersen Air Force Base on Guam

Observers from the Chinese People's Liberation Army Navy were invited to attend, as were naval officers from India, Singapore, Japan, Australia, South Korea, Russia, Indonesia, and Malaysia. It was the first time observers from the People's Republic of China had ever been sent to observe U.S. war games. China sent a ten-person delegation, including one high-ranking officer each from its navy, army, and air force, as well as officials from its foreign ministry. According to USA Today, Chinese military observers said that observing the exercises gave them a better understanding of U.S. weapons and tactics. Rear Admiral Zhang Leiyu, leader of the delegation, called the visit to the war games near Guam "a positive step in China-U.S. military ties."

Military ties between the United States and China have not been close ever since a communist government came to power in China. Admiral William J. Fallon, the top U.S. commander in the Pacific, said it was "a start" that China accepted his invitation to observe the large-scale exercises. Fallon indicated before the exercises began that he expected China to reciprocate. However, neither Zhang or the Xinhua report gave any indication that such an invitation was forthcoming.

The exercise had implications for other world events as well, including acting as a show of force to possibly deter North Korea from test-firing its new Taepodong-2 missile.

== Participating forces ==
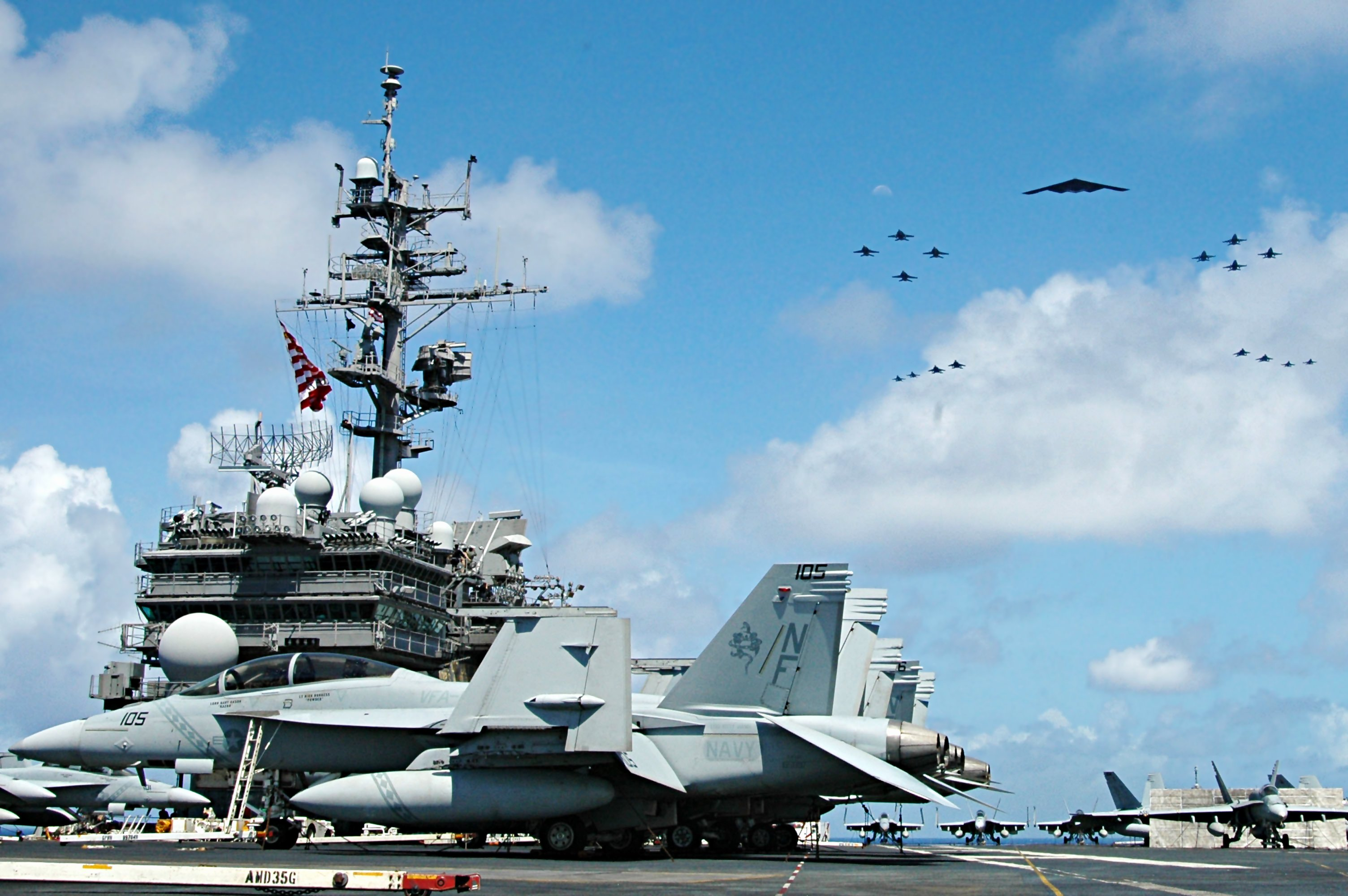
USS Kitty Hawk (CV-63) during the exercise, with fighter and bomber planes flying overhead

The following U.S. forces participated in Valiant Shield 2006:

- Joint Task Force 519 staff, Pearl Harbor, Hawaii
- Joint Task Force 519 Joint Force Air Component Command, Kenney Headquarters, Hickam AFB, Hawaii
- Joint Task Force 519 Joint Force Maritime Component Command, aboard USS Blue Ridge

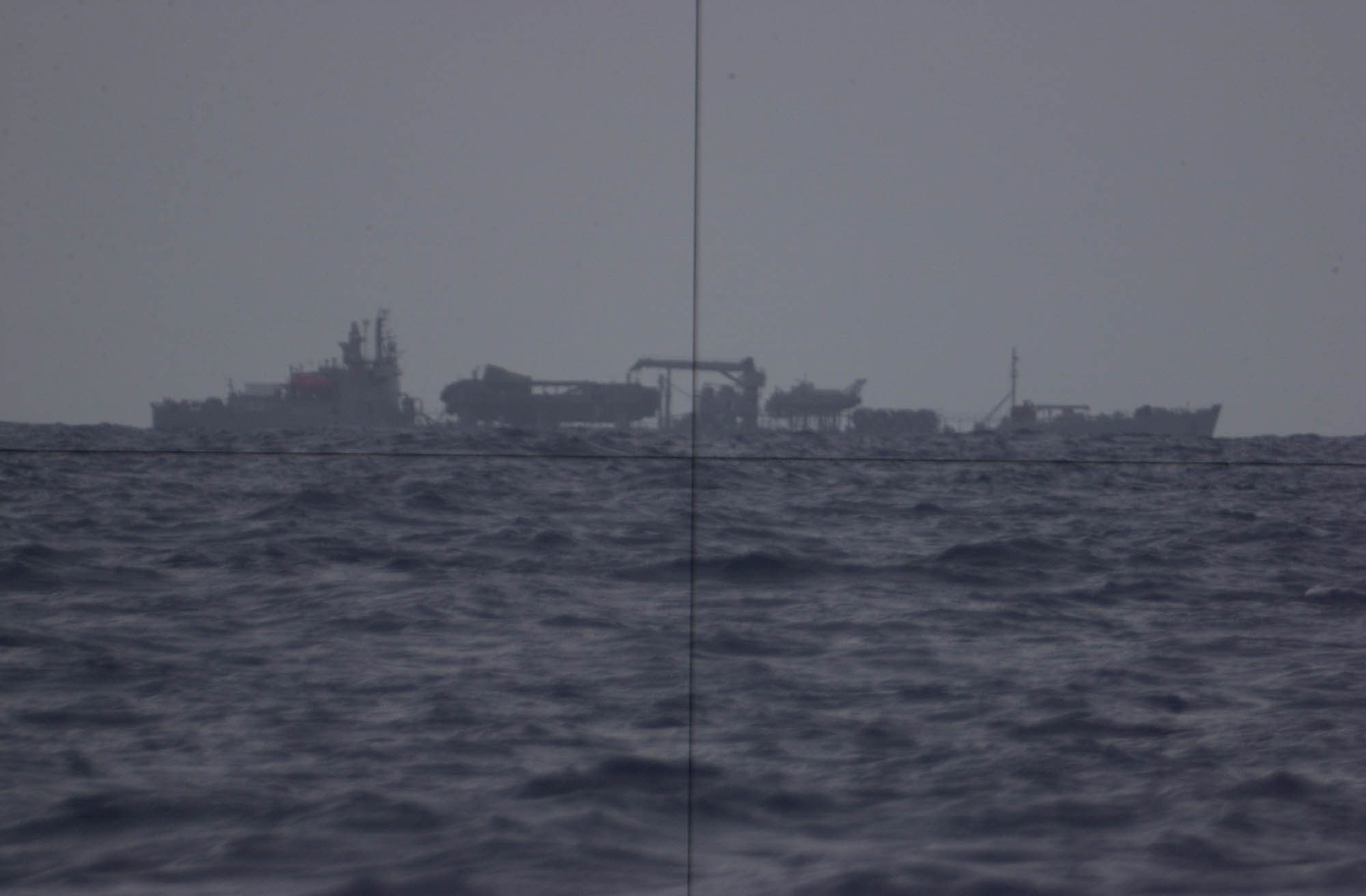
Attack submarine USS Houston, (SSN-713) takes periscope reading on the SS Petersburg, (T-AOT-9101).

=== United States Navy ===
==== Carrier Strike Group Five/Kitty Hawk Carrier Strike Group ====
- USS Kitty Hawk, (CV-63), United States Fleet Activities Yokosuka, Japan
- Carrier Air Wing Five (CVW-5), Naval Air Facility Atsugi, Japan
- USS Cowpens, (CG-63), Yokosuka, Japan
- USS John S. McCain, (DDG-56), Yokosuka, Japan
- USS Vandegrift, (FFG-48), Yokosuka, Japan
- USS Lassen, (DDG-82), Yokosuka, Japan
- USS Curtis Wilbur, (DDG-54), Yokosuka, Japan
- USS Fitzgerald, (DDG-62), Yokosuka, Japan

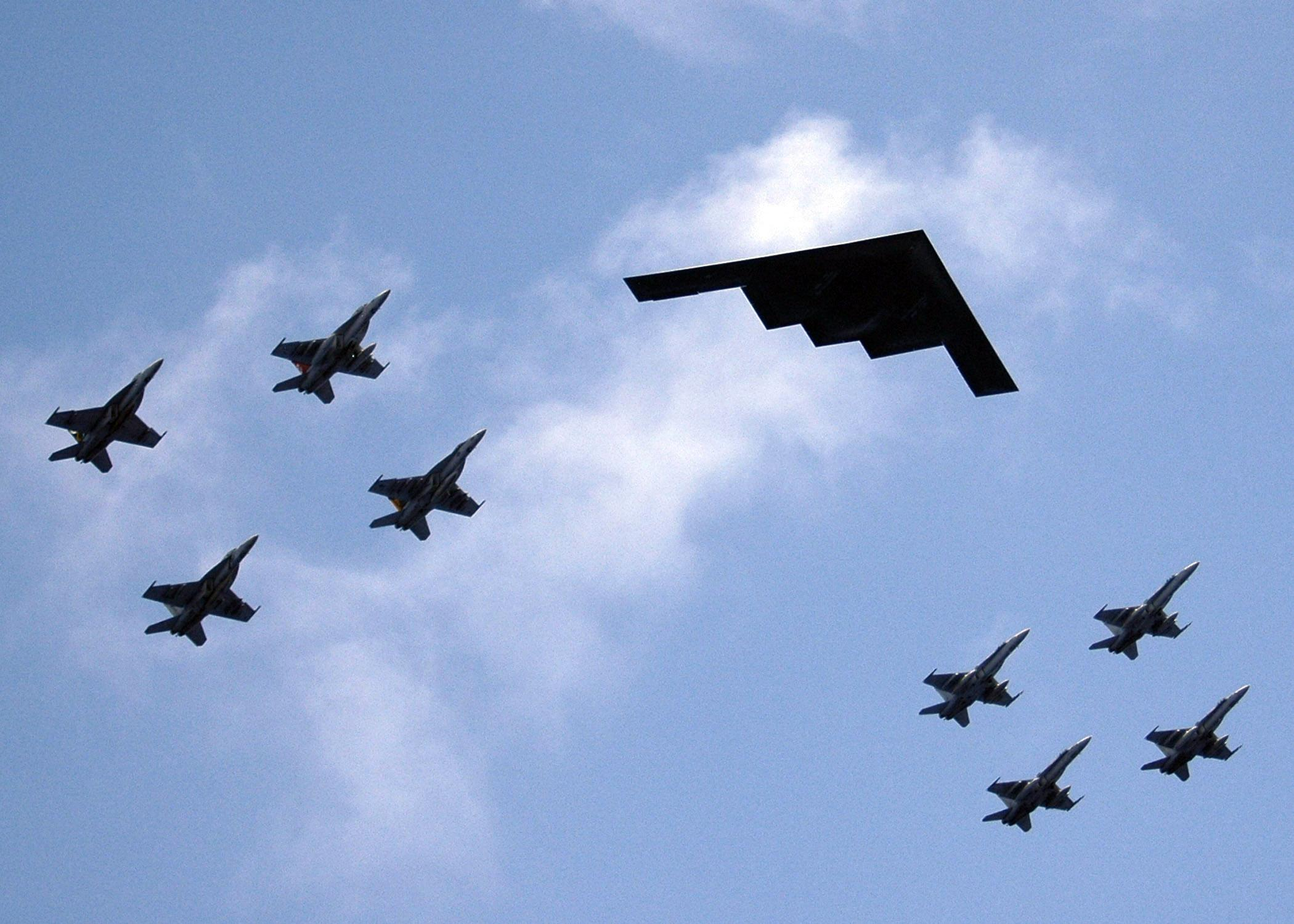
B-2 Spirit stealth bomber from Missouri leads aerial formation.

==== Carrier Strike Group Nine/Abraham Lincoln Carrier Strike Group ====
- USS Abraham Lincoln, (CVN-72), Naval Station Everett, Wash.
- Carrier Air Wing Two (CVW-2), Naval Air Station Lemoore, California
- USS Mobile Bay, (CG-53), Naval Station San Diego, Calif.
- USS Shoup, (DDG-86), Everett, Wash.
- USS Russell, (DDG-59) Pearl Harbor, Hawaii

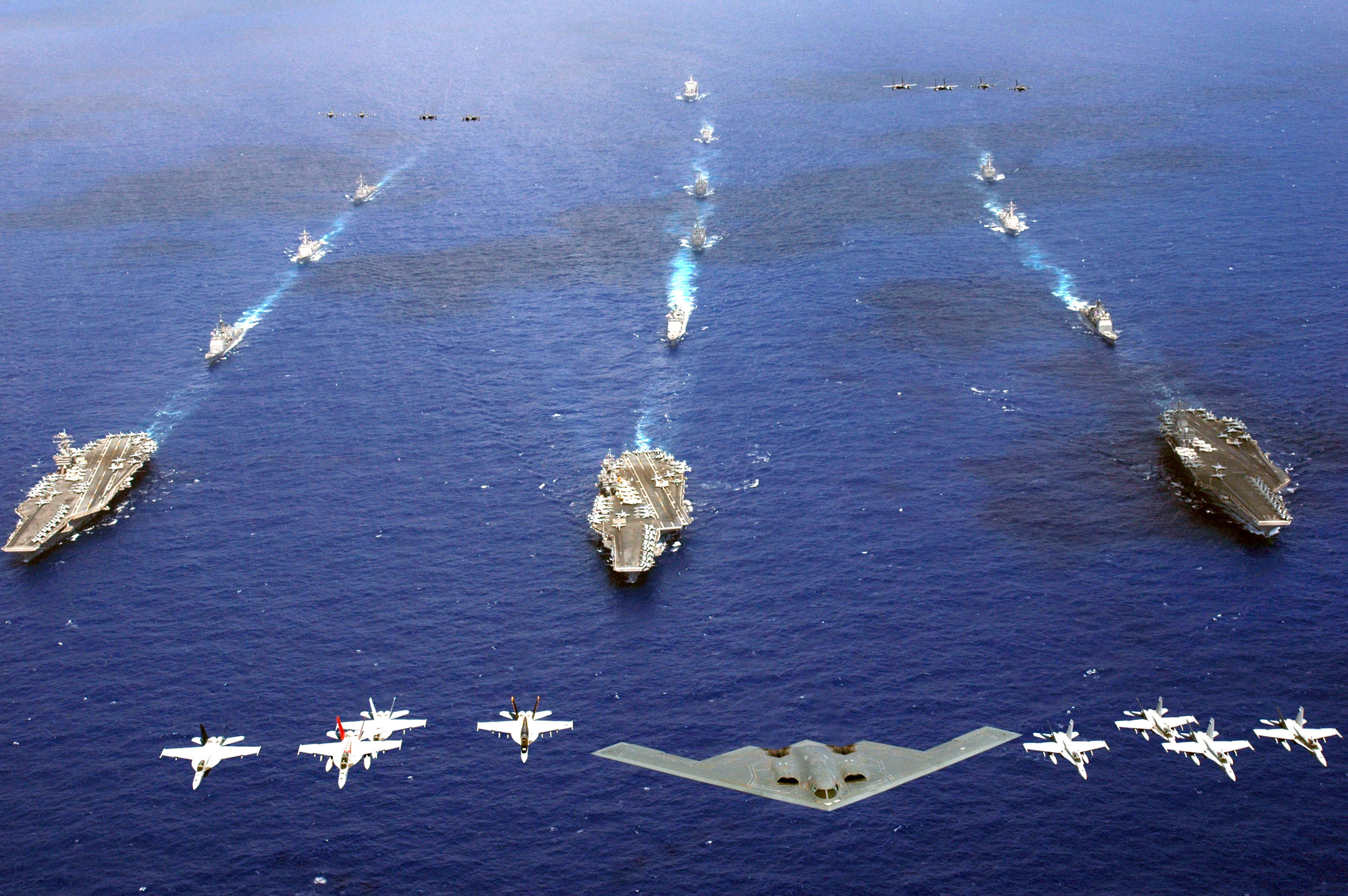
A B-2 Spirit leading the USS Kitty Hawk, USS Ronald Reagan, and the USS Abraham Lincoln carrier strike groups

==== Carrier Strike Group Seven/Ronald Reagan Carrier Strike Group ====
- USS Ronald Reagan, (CVN-76), San Diego, Calif.
- Carrier Air Wing Fourteen (CVW-14), Lemoore, Calif.
- USS Decatur, (DDG-73), San Diego, Calif.
- USS Lake Champlain, (CG-57), San Diego, Calif.
- USS McCampbell, (DDG-85), San Diego, Calif.
- USNS Rainier, (T-AOE-7), Naval Base Bremerton, Washington

==== Other Navy Units ====
- USS Blue Ridge, (LCC-19), Yokosuka, Japan
- USS Houston, (SSN-713), Guam
- USS Honolulu, (SSN-718), Pearl Harbor, Hawaii
- USS Hampton, (SSN-767)
- USS Key West, (SSN-722)
- USS City of Corpus Christi, (SSN-705), Guam
- USS Tucson, (SSN-770), Pearl Harbor, Hawaii
- USS Frank Cable (AS-40), Apra Harbor, Guam
- USNS Impeccable, (T-AGS-23)
- RV Cory Chouest
- MV PFC James Anderson Jr., (T-AK-3002)
- MV MAJ Bernard F. Fisher, (T-AK-4396)
- USNS Watson, (T-AKR-310)
- SS Cape Jacob, (T-AK-5029)
- SS Petersburg, (T-AOT-9101)
- Helicopter Anti-Submarine Light 51 (HSL-51), SH-60 Detachments 1,2,3,4,6,11, Atsugi, Japan
- VP-9 (Patrol Squadron Nine), P-3C Detachment, Kaneohe, Hawaii
- Fleet Air Reconnaissance Squadron One, EP-3E Detachment, Misawa, Japan
- Strategic Communications Wing One, E-6 Mercury Detachment

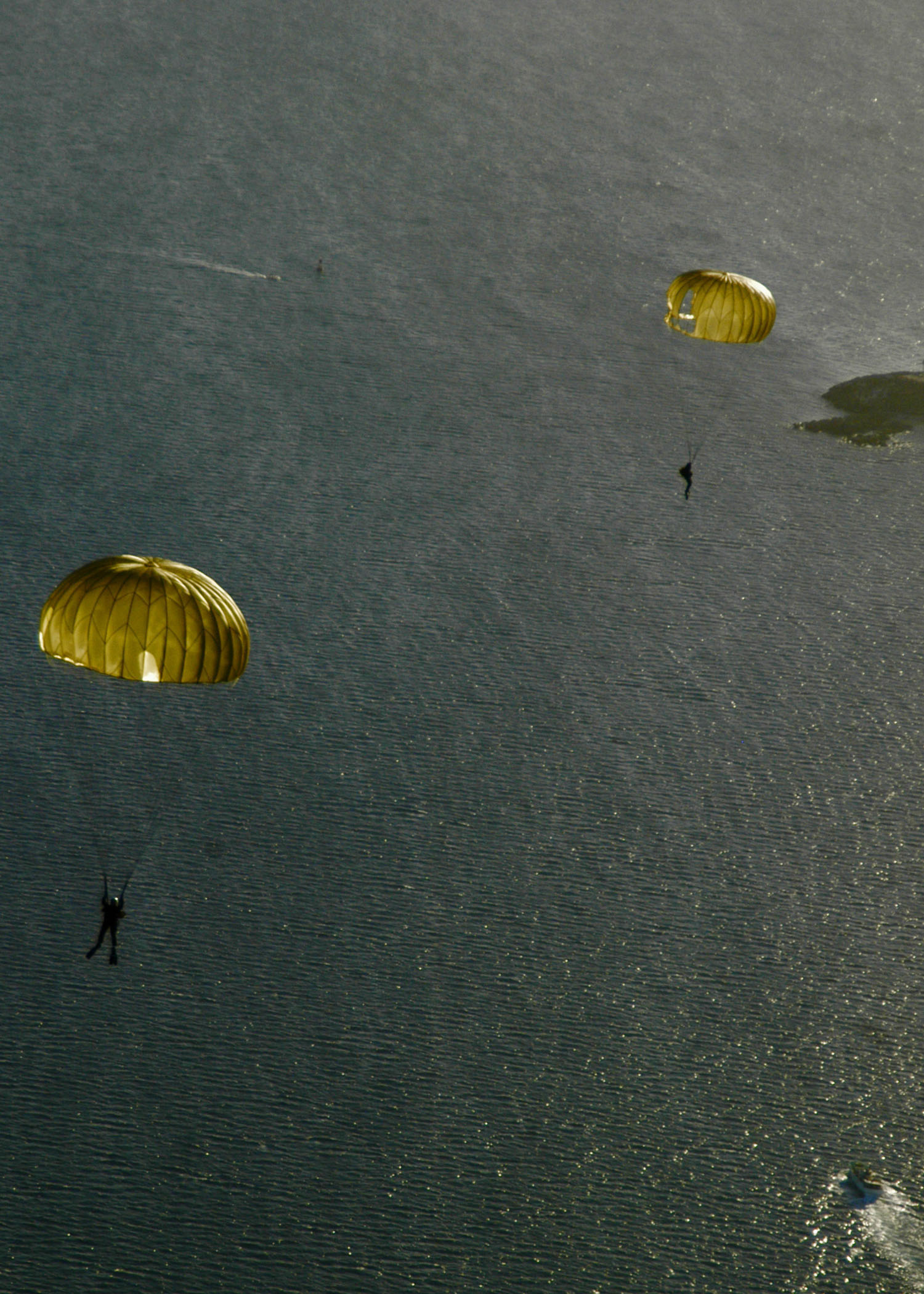
Sailors from the Navy Special Warfare (NSW) community, Explosive Ordnance Disposal (EOD) technicians and Navy SEALs conduct a static-line parachute jump off the coast of Guam from HH-60H helicopters.

=== United States Air Force ===
==== 13th Air Force/Kenney Headquarters (PACAF) ====
- Pacific Air Operations Center, Hickam AFB, Hawaii
- 36th Wing, Andersen AFB, Guam

==== Fifth Air Force ====
- 18th Wing, Kadena AB, Okinawa, Japan (F-15C/KC-135/E-3)
- 35th Fighter Wing, Misawa AB, Japan (F-16CJ)

==== Eighth Air Force ====
- 509th Bomb Wing, Whiteman AFB, Missouri (B-2)

==== 11th Air Force (PACAF) ====
- 3rd Wing, Elmendorf AFB, Alaska (F-15E)

==== Eighteenth Air Force ====
- 60th Air Mobility Wing, Travis AFB California (KC-10)
- 305th Air Mobility Wing, McGuire AFB New Jersey (KC-10)

==== New York Air National Guard ====
- 107th Air Refueling Wing, Niagara Falls International Airport (KC-135)

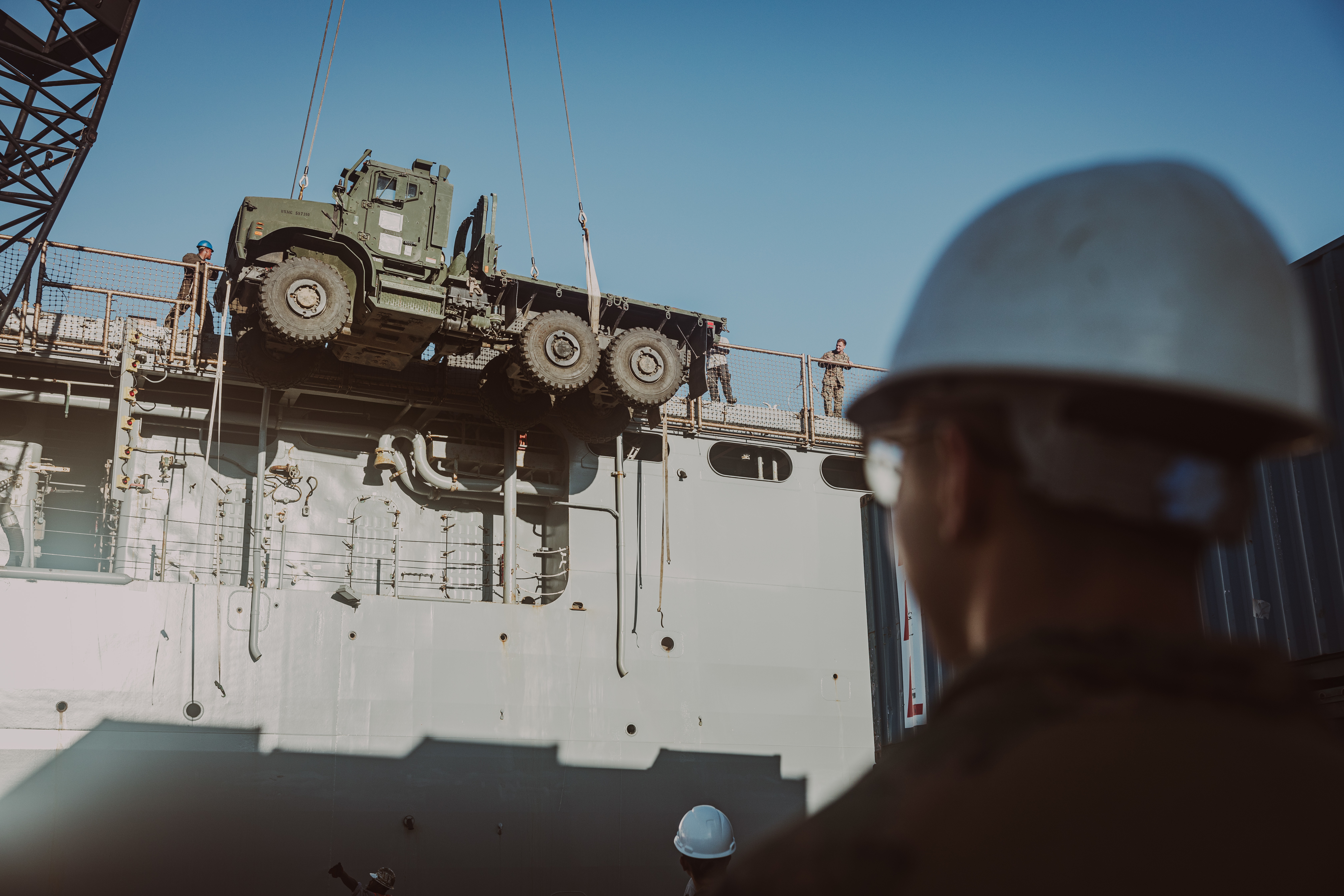
U.S. Marine Corps Lance Cpl. Ryan Romero, a motor vehicle operator with Combat Logistics Battalion 15, 1st Marine Logistics Group, observes the offload of a Medium Tactical Vehicle Replacement in support of Valiant Shield 2022 on Palau, May 31, 2022. Exercises such as Valiant Shield enable real-world proficiency in sustaining joint forces through detecting, locating, tracking and engaging units at sea, in the air, on land and in cyberspace in response to a range of mission areas. (U.S. Marine Corps photo by Cpl. Samuel C. Fletcher)

=== United States Marine Corps ===
- I Marine Expeditionary Force, Camp Pendleton, California
- III Marine Expeditionary Force, Okinawa, Japan

=== United States Coast Guard ===
- USCGC Galveston Island (WPB-1349), Guam
