= USS Houston =

Four United States Navy ships have borne the name USS Houston, after the city of Houston, Texas.

- USS Houston (AK-1) was a cargo ship during World War I
- USS Houston (CA-30) was a Northampton-class heavy cruiser commissioned in 1930, and sunk in 1942
- USS Houston (CL-81) was a Cleveland-class light cruiser commissioned in 1943, and decommissioned in 1947
- USS Houston (SSN-713) was a Los Angeles-class submarine, commissioned in 1982, and decommissioned in 2016
