= Thomas Hebert =

American ocean-going tugboat, sank 1993

History
- Owner: S.C. Loveland Co.
- Launched: 1975
- Fate: Sunk 7 March 1993

General characteristics
- Displacement: 99 tons
- Length: 94 ft (29 m)
- Beam: 27 ft (8.2 m)
- Crew: 7

Thomas Hebert was an ocean-going tugboat that sank off the coast of New Jersey on Sunday 7 March 1993.

== History ==
Built in 1975 in a shipyard in Orange, Texas, the tug measured 94 ft × 27 ft (28.7 m × 8.2 m), displaced 99 tons and carried a crew of 7. She was last owned by S.C. Loveland Co. of Pennsville, New Jersey.

Thomas Hebert had left Virginia for Maine on 5 March 1993, towing a barge carrying 8,500 tons of coal. She sank in 140 feet (43 m) of water off the New Jersey coast with the loss of five lives at 3am on Sunday 7 March 1993.

The sunken vessel was found intact, still attached by a steel cable to the floating barge that she had been towing. The cable showed traces of metal from the hull of another vessel, suggesting that a submarine snagged the tow cable, pulling the tug under, in an incident similar to that of USS Houston sinking the tugboat Barcona in 1989.

Other theories included a faulty steering caused the tug to turn so suddenly and sharply that it took on water at the stern and sank itself. Another theory is that due to a mechanical failure the tug steered itself in a larger circle in the middle of the night and was passed, then pulled backward and under, by the barge it was towing. The latter is not an uncommon accident in the marine towing industry; it is known as tripping. An example of this happened 11 May 2001 when the 115 feet (35 m) tugboat Bay Titan had her barge overtake her and pull her under while turning from the Delaware River to the entrance of the Chesapeake and Delaware Canal.
