= North Houston =

North Houston may refer to:

- Communities in the northern areas of Houston, Texas, United States
- North Houston, Texas United States

== See also ==
- Houston (disambiguation)
