= Heuston =

Heuston is a surname. Notable people with the surname include:

- Robert Heuston, (1923-1995), British legal scholar and legal historian
- Seán Heuston, (1891-1916), Irish rebel leader

== See also ==
- Heuston railway station, a Dublin railway station named after Seán Heuston
- Seán Heuston Bridge, a cast iron bridge spanning the River Liffey beside Heuston Station, Dublin
- Houstoun
- Huston (disambiguation)
- Houston (disambiguation)
- Euston (disambiguation)
