= Adenylate kinase 1 =

Mammalian protein found in humans

AK1

Identifiers
- Aliases: AK1, HTL-S-58j, adenylate kinase 1
- External IDs: OMIM: 103000; MGI: 87977; GeneCards: AK1
Available structures
PDB	Ortholog search: PDBe RCSB
PDB	List of PDB id codes 1Z83, 2C95
Enzyme activity
EC #	BRENDA	ExPASy	KEGG	MetaCyc
2.7.4.3	↗	↗	↗	↗
2.7.4.4	↗	↗	↗	↗
2.7.4.6	↗	↗	↗	↗

Gene location (Human)
Chr.	Chromosome 9 (human)
Band	9q34.11	Start	127,866,486 bp
Band	9q34.11	End	127,877,675 bp

Gene location (Mouse)
Chr.	Chromosome 2 (mouse)
Band	2 B|2 22.09 cM	Start	32,511,770 bp
Band	2 B|2 22.09 cM	End	32,525,070 bp
RNA expression pattern
Bgee	Human / Mouse (ortholog); Top expressed in: apex of heart; muscle of thigh; gastrocnemius muscle; right uterine tube; left ventricle; right auricle of heart; hypothalamus; skeletal muscle tissue; amygdala; substantia nigra / Top expressed in: extensor digitorum longus muscle; plantaris muscle; triceps brachii muscle; muscle of thigh; sternocleidomastoid muscle; temporal muscle; digastric muscle; vastus lateralis muscle; triceps surae; ankle; More reference expression data
BioGPS	n/a
Gene ontology
Molecular function	transferase activity; nucleotide binding; kinase activity; nucleobase-containing compound kinase activity; nucleoside diphosphate kinase activity; ATP binding; adenylate kinase activity
Cellular component	extracellular exosome; cytoplasm; cytosol
Biological process	nucleobase-containing small molecule interconversion; phosphorylation; nucleoside diphosphate phosphorylation; ATP metabolic process; nucleoside triphosphate biosynthetic process; nucleobase-containing compound metabolic process; ADP biosynthetic process; AMP metabolic process; nucleoside monophosphate phosphorylation
Sources:Amigo / QuickGO
Orthologs
Databases	NCBI: entry; OMA: entry
Species	Human	Mouse
Entrez	203	11636
Ensembl	ENSG00000106992	ENSMUSG00000026817
UniProt	P00568	Q9R0Y5
RefSeq (mRNA)	NM_000476; NM_001318121; NM_001318122	NM_001198790; NM_001198791; NM_001198792; NM_021515
RefSeq (protein)	NP_000467; NP_001305050; NP_001305051	NP_001185719; NP_001185720; NP_001185721; NP_067490
Location (UCSC)	Chr 9: 127.87 – 127.88 Mb	Chr 2: 32.51 – 32.53 Mb
PubMed search
- Wikidata
View/Edit Human	View/Edit Mouse

Adenylate kinase 1 is a protein that in humans is encoded by the AK1 gene.

== Function ==
This gene encodes an adenylate kinase enzyme involved in energy metabolism and homeostasis of cellular adenine nucleotide ratios in different intracellular compartments. This gene is highly expressed in skeletal muscle, brain and erythrocytes. Certain mutations in this gene resulting in a functionally inadequate enzyme are associated with a rare genetic disorder causing nonspherocytic hemolytic anemia. Alternative splicing of this gene results in multiple transcript variants encoding different isoforms. [provided by RefSeq, Dec 2015].

== See also ==
- AK-1
