= Houston station =

Houston station may refer to:

- Houston station (British Columbia), a Canadian National Railway station in Houston, British Columbia
- Houston station (Texas), an Amtrak station in Houston, Texas, U.S.
- Houston railway station (Scotland), a station in Houston, Renfrewshire, Scotland
- Georgetown railway station (Scotland), originally Houston, a former railway station Houston, Renfrewshire, Scotland
- New York City subway:
  - Houston Street station (IND Second Avenue Line), a proposed station
  - Houston Street station (IRT Broadway–Seventh Avenue Line), opened 1918
  - Houston Street station (IRT Ninth Avenue Line), operated 1873–1940
  - Houston Street station (IRT Third Avenue Line), operated 1878–1955

== See also ==
- Houston (disambiguation)
- Houston Street (disambiguation)
- Heuston railway station, in Dublin, Ireland
- Union Station (Houston), a Union Station in Houston, Texas
- Euston station, in London
