= SS Mount Washington =

American transport oiler

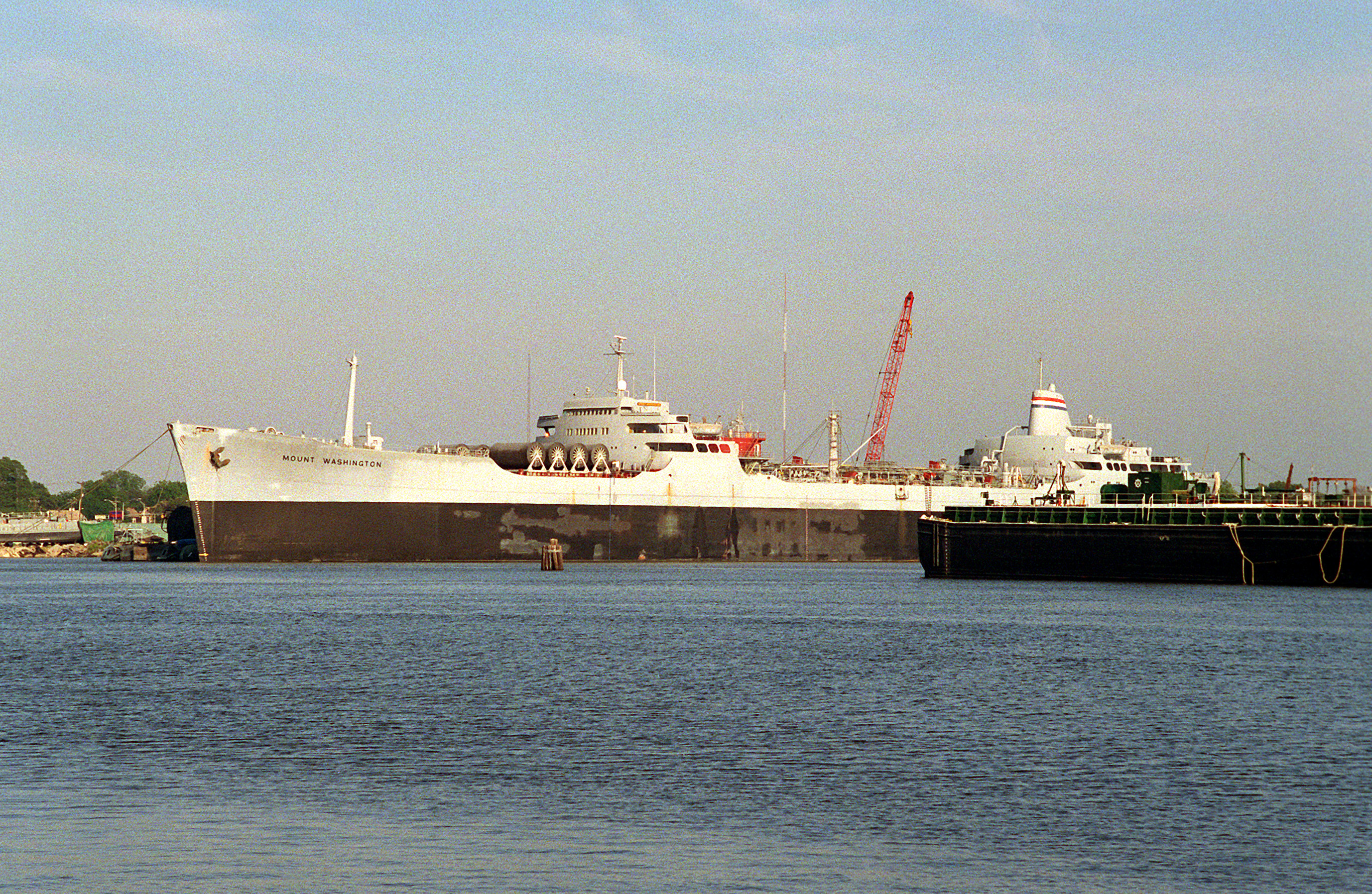

History

United States
- Name: SS Mount Washington
- Builder: Bethlehem Steel Corp., Quincy, Massachusetts, U.S.
- Laid down: 1963
- Sponsored by: Mount Washington Tanker Co.
- Completed: 31 October 1963
- Out of service: 2007
- Stricken: 2007
- Identification: T-AOT-5076
- Fate: Designated for scrapping

General characteristics
- Class & type: Transport oiler
- Tonnage: 27,797 gross tons
- Length: 736 ft (224 m)
- Beam: 102 ft (31 m)
- Draft: 40 ft 1 in (12.22 m)
- Propulsion: Steam turbines, 2 boilers, 1 shaft, 21,500 shp
- Speed: 15.3 knots (28.3 km/h)
- Capacity: 364,000 barrels of oil (57,900 m³)
- Complement: 38

SS Mount Washington (T-AOT-5076) was an American transport oiler. Originally built for commercial interests, it became one of four Offshore Petroleum Discharge System (OPDS) tankers within the Ready Reserve Force maintained by the United States Maritime Administration. The Mount Washington was one of the largest of the fleet — 736 feet (224 m) long, a beam of 102 feet (31 m), and a capacity of 364,000 barrels of oil (57,900 m³ ). The ship was designated for scrapping in 2013.

== History ==
Built in 1963 for the commercial trade, the Mount Washington was turned over to the Maritime Administration in 1987 and was placed into the Ready Reserve Force as one of 13 "Common User Tankers" for activation in the event of national emergency.

Previously layberthed in Houston, the ship was towed to Suisun Bay where she was maintained in a ROS-40 status, meaning she would have been ready for deployment in 40 days or less. Mount Washington was removed from the reserve fleet on 18 November 2013 for scrapping in Brownsville, Texas.

== Background ==
The Ready Reserve Force (RRF) is the Maritime Administration (MARAD) program which provides sealift of supplies for the U.S. military throughout the world. The RRF supplements the Maritime Prepositioning Program which has strategically located ships pre-loaded with United States Army or United States Marine Corps equipment.

The former commercial vessels of RRF sit empty while they await call-up. Under the program, the ships must be ready for loading and sailing within 4, 5, 10, or 20 days. Those assigned 4 and 5 day readiness have a permanent skeleton crew of 9 or 10 mariners. Private shipping companies under contract to MARAD provide maintenance, activation, manning, and vessel operation.

The Department of Defense periodically tests readiness of the RRF by initiating no-notice activations, and by routine activations for military cargo operations and exercises. RRF ships are also used for cargo handling training by Navy Reserve and Army Reserve units. When activated, control of the RRF ships transfers from the Maritime Administration to the Military Sealift Command, part of the United States Navy.

The Offshore Petroleum Discharge System (OPDS) was designed by and for the Navy, for use with the Army and Marine Corps' Inland Petroleum Distribution System (IPDS). The OPDS is stored aboard a selected Ready Reserve Fleet tanker. It is transported to a theater of operations by the tanker. The OPDS provides 1.2 million US gallons (4,500 m^{3}) per 20-hour day of refined petroleum to the beach, from a tanker moored four miles (6.4 km) from shore. The tanker is crewed by civilians.

Other OPDS tankers are the SS American Osprey, SS Petersburg, and the SS Chesapeake.

== Sources ==
- FM 10-67-1 CONCEPTS AND EQUIPMENT OF PETROLEUM OPERATIONS
