= Houston High School =

There are a number of high schools in the United States named Houston High School, including:

- Houston High School (Houston, Alaska)
- Houston High School (Houston, Minnesota)
- Houston High School (Houston, Mississippi)
- Houston High School (Houston, Missouri), listed on the National Register of Historic Places
- Houston High School (Ohio)
- Houston High School (Germantown, Tennessee)
- Houston High School (El Paso, Texas)
- Houston High School (Houston, Texas), now known as Sam Houston Math, Science, and Technology Center

== See also ==
- Sam Houston High School (disambiguation)
