= Houstoun =

Houstoun is a surname. Notable people with the surname include:

- John Houstoun (1744 – 1796), American lawyer and statesman from Savannah, Georgia
- Dr. William Houstoun (botanist) (1695–1733), British surgeon and botanist
- William Houstoun (lawyer) (1755–1813), American lawyer, Continental Congressman for Georgia
- Sir William Houstoun (fl. 1830s), British army officer, Governor of Gibraltar

== See also ==
- Houston (disambiguation)
- Heuston, a surname
