= Houston Street Ferry =

Former ferry in Manhattan and Brooklyn, New York

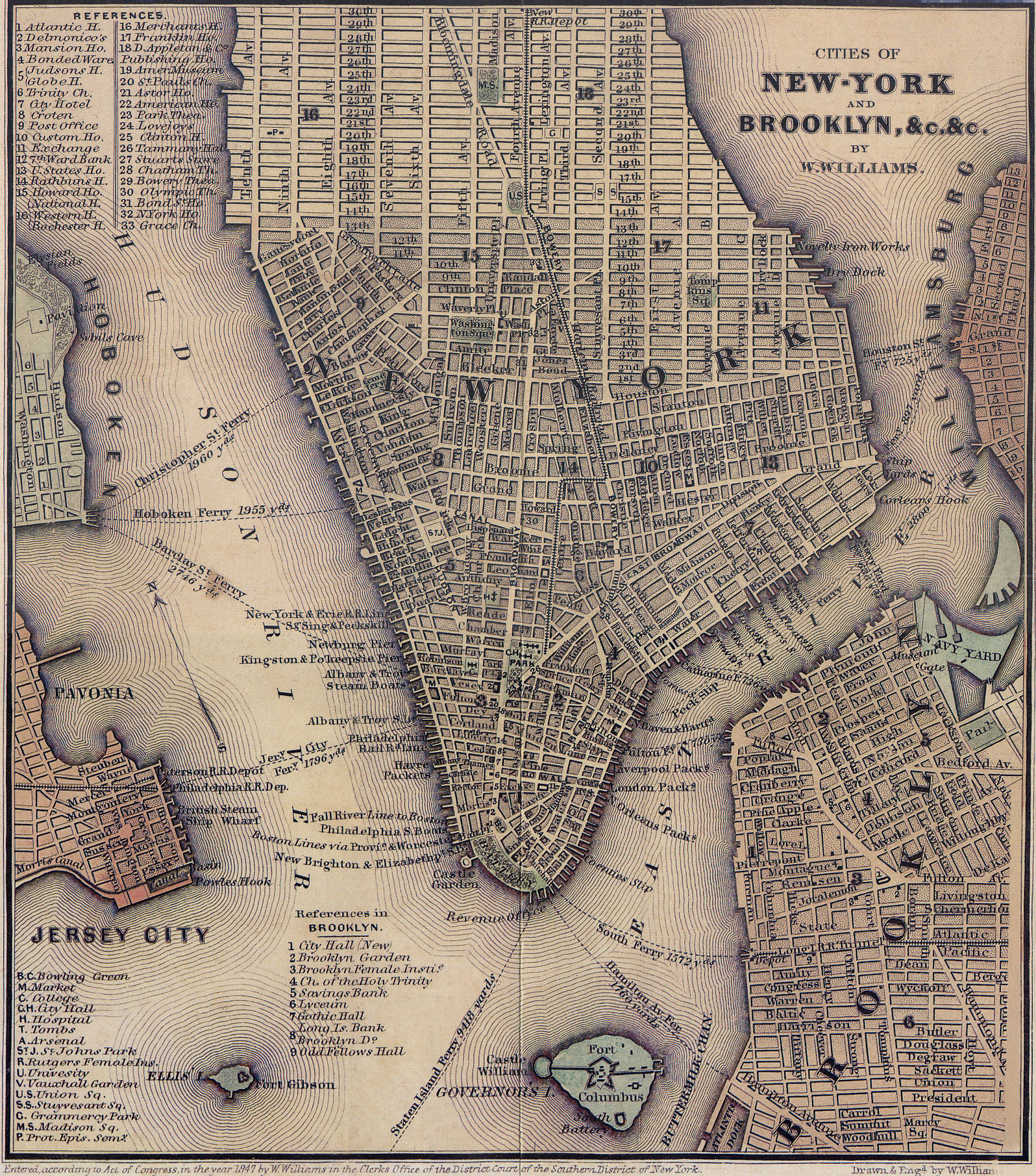
Map from 1847 showing the route of the Houston Street Ferry.

The Houston Street Ferry was a ferry route connecting Manhattan and Williamsburg, Brooklyn, New York City, United States, joining Houston Street (Manhattan) and Grand Street (Brooklyn) across the East River.

== History ==
The Houston Street Ferry began operations in 1840, joining the Grand Street Ferry at Grand Street.
