= Houston (given name) =

Houston is a masculine given name which may refer to:

- Houston Alexander (born 1972), American mixed martial artist
- Houston Antwine (1939–2011), American football player
- Houston A. Baker Jr. (born 1943), American scholar
- Houston Bates (born 1991), American football player
- Houston Bone (born 1993), Canadian filmmaker and writer
- Houston Boines (1918–1970), American singer
- Houston Branch (1899–1968), American screenwriter
- Houston Bright (1916–1970), American composer
- Houston Stewart Chamberlain (1855–1927), British-German writer
- Houston Collisson (1865–1920), Irish priest
- Houston Davis (1914–1987), American composer
- Houston Fancher (born 1966), American basketball coach
- Houston I. Flournoy (1929–2008), American politician
- Houston French (1853–1932), British Army officer
- Houston Gaines (born 1995), American politician
- Houston Gwin (1876–1958), American football player
- Houston Harte (1893–1972), American newspaper editor
- Houston Hogg (1948–2020), American football player
- Houston Jiménez (born 1957), Mexican baseball player
- Houston Markham (1944–2019), American football player
- Houston McTear (1957–2015), American sprinter
- Houston Nutt (born 1957), American football player
- Houston Person (born 1934), American saxophonist
- Houston Ridge (1944–2015), American football player
- Houston Roberts (1905–1951), American murderer
- Houston Stewart (1791–1875), English admiral
- Houston Tumlin (1992–2021), American actor
