= Aleksandrov-Kalinin AK-1 =

AK-1
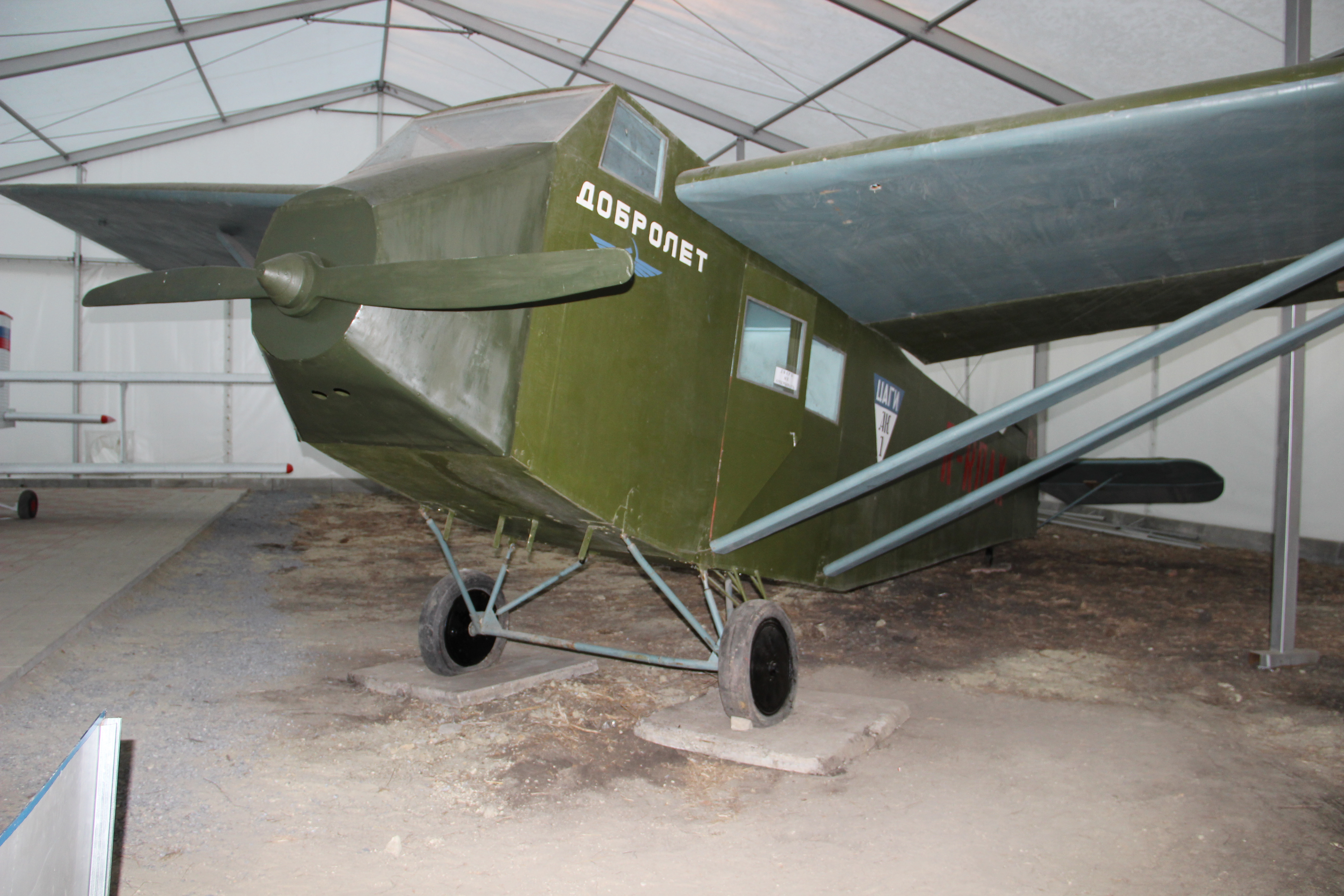

General information
- Type: Airliner
- National origin: Soviet Union
- Manufacturer: GAZ-5
- Designer: Vladimir Leont'evich Aleksandrov; Vladimir Vladimirovich Kalinin
- Number built: 1

History
- First flight: 1 February 1924

The Aleksandrov-Kalinin AK-1 was a prototype airliner built in the Soviet Union in the early 1920s, designed as part of a project by TsAGI to investigate low-cost construction techniques and to verify calculation models for thick-section airfoils. It was a high-wing, strut-braced monoplane of conventional design, powered by a single engine in the nose. Two passengers could be carried in an enclosed cabin in the fuselage, while a separate enclosed cockpit was provided for the pilot, and either a co-pilot or an additional passenger. Construction was wooden throughout.

The aircraft was assembled at the GAZ-5 factory during 1923 and flight testing began in February 1924. Money for the project had been donated by the Latvian Riflemen, and the AK-1 was named Латышский стрелок (Latyshskii Strelok - "Latvian Sharpshooter") in recognition of this. Following flight tests, it was handed over to Dobrolyot, who used it on a route between Moscow and Kazan. In 1925, it was used in a propaganda flight from Moscow to Beijing and other Chinese cities, flying 7,000 km (4,300 mi) in 38 days.

== Operators ==
Soviet Union

- Dobrolyot

== Specifications ==
General characteristics

- Crew: one-two pilots
- Capacity: two-three passengers
- Length: 11.00 m (36 ft 1 in)
- Wingspan: 14.90 m (48 ft 11 in)
- Height: 3.80 m (12 ft 6 in)
- Wing area: 37.0 m^{2} (398 sq ft)
- Empty weight: 1,096 kg (2,411 lb)
- Gross weight: 1,685 kg (3,707 lb)
- Powerplant: 1 × Salmson RB.9 water-cooled 9-cylinder radial , 130 kW (170 hp)

Performance

- Maximum speed: 147 km/h (92 mph, 80 kn)
- Endurance: 5-6 hours
- Service ceiling: 2,200 m (7,200 ft)
- Rate of climb: 1.2 m/s (230 ft/min)
