= Houston County =

Houston County is the name of five counties in the United States:

- Houston County, Alabama
- Houston County, Georgia
- Houston County, Minnesota
- Houston County, Tennessee
- Houston County, Texas

Houston County may also refer to:

- Houston County (band), a country music band
