= SS Chesapeake =

Scrapped oiler

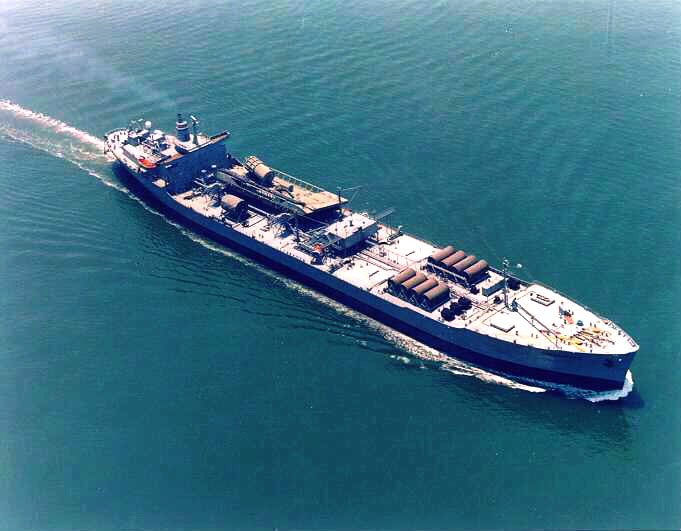
- SS Chesapeake (AOT-584)

History

United States
- Name: Chesapeake
- Namesake: Chesapeake Bay
- Builder: Bethlehem Steel Sparrows Point Yard
- Launched: 18 August 1964
- Completed: 29 October 1964
- Acquired: 15 December 1987 (by Maritime Administration
- In service: 2000 with Military Sealift Command
- Out of service: 3 February 2009
- Renamed: SS Chesapeake 22 July 1980 (used to be SS Hess Voyager)
- Stricken: 30 November 2020
- Identification: IMO number: 6420056; MMSI number: 368839000; Callsign: KNFE
- Fate: Scrapped 2021
- Notes: Served as commercial tanker SS Hess Voyager 1964–1980 and SS Chesapeake 1980–1987; Laid up in Maritime Administration Ready Reserve Fleet 1987–2000

General characteristics
- Type: Transport oiler
- Displacement: 14,977 tons (light); 48,993 tons (full load)
- Length: 736 ft (224 m)
- Beam: 102 ft (31 m)
- Draft: 39 ft (12 m) maximum
- Installed power: 15,000 hp (11,000 kW)
- Propulsion: Two Combustion Engineering boilers, two Bethlehem turbines, one shaft
- Speed: 14 knots (26 km/h; 16 mph)
- Capacity: 257,000 bbl (40,900 m^{3}) of fuel oil
- Complement: 37
- Notes: The ship's integral offshore petroleum discharge system (OPDS) allows her to discharge her entire cargo from up to 4 nmi (7.4 km; 4.6 mi) off shore

SS Chesapeake is a transport oiler that was in service with the United States Navy from 2000 to 2009. She was operated by Military Sealift Command.

== Construction and commercial service 1964–1987 ==
Chesapeake was built by the Bethlehem Steel Sparrows Point Yard at Baltimore, Maryland, and delivered to the Hess Shipping Company on 29 October 1964. She entered commercial service with the company as the tanker SS Hess Voyager. She was renamed SS Chesapeake on 22 July 1980. She is a near exact twin to her sister ship Petersburg.

== Ready Reserve Force 1987–2000 ==
The U.S. Maritime Administration relieved Hess Shipping of Chesapeake under an exchange program on 15 December 1987. Chesapeake was then laid up in the Maritime Administration's Ready Reserve Fleet until 2000.

== Military Sealift Command Service 2000–2009 ==
Chesapeake was activated for service in the Military Sealift Command in 2000 as a transport oiler. Interocean Ugland Management Corporation of Voorhees, New Jersey, operates her with a civilian crew under contract to Military Sealift Command as a Common User Tanker as SS Chesapeake (AOT-5084).

Other OPDS tankers are the SS American Osprey, SS Petersburg, and SS Mount Washington. Chesapeake was removed from service in 2009 and was scrapped on 19 April 2021 at Brownsville, Texas.

== Gallery ==
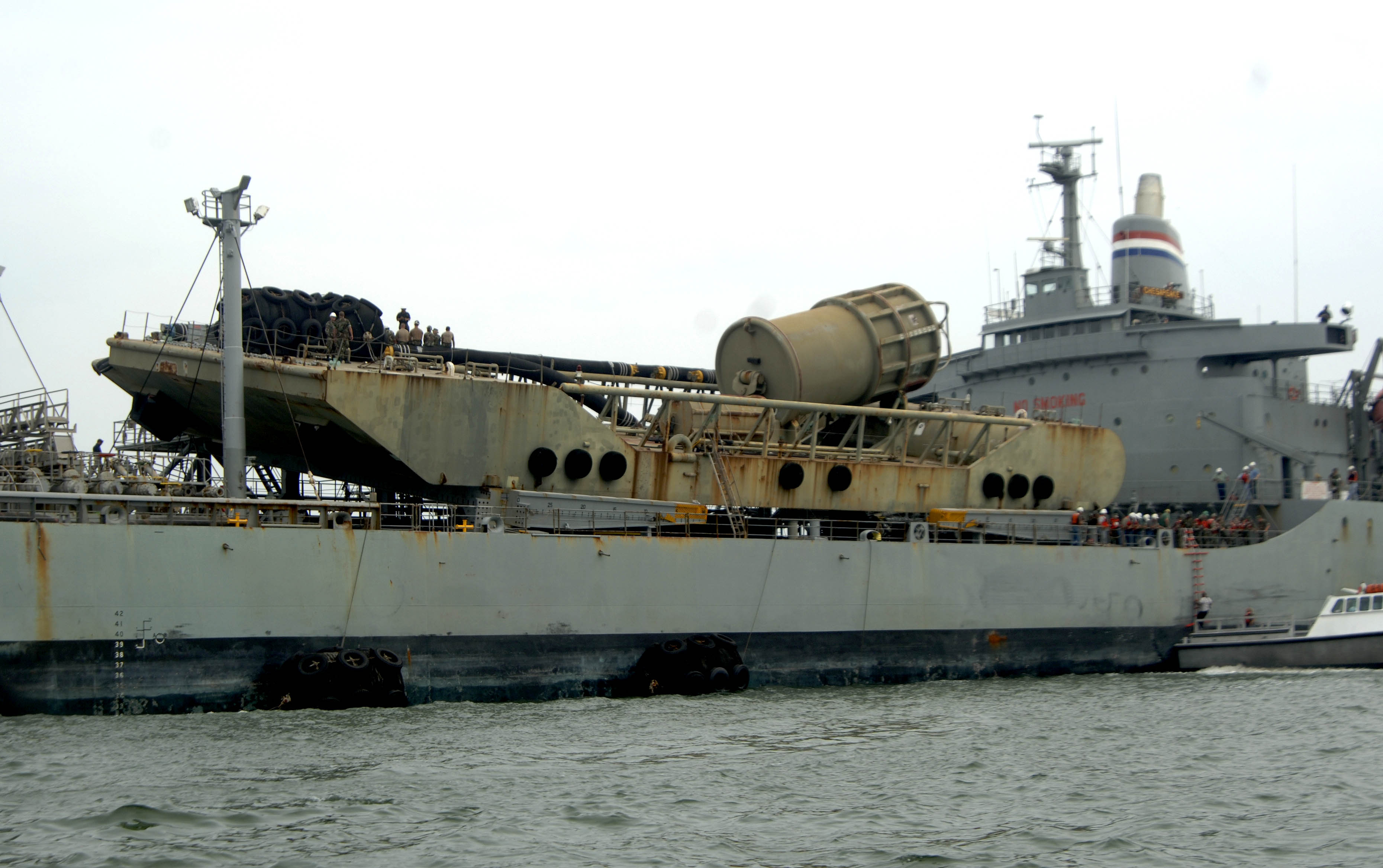
Chesapeake amidships view of SALM

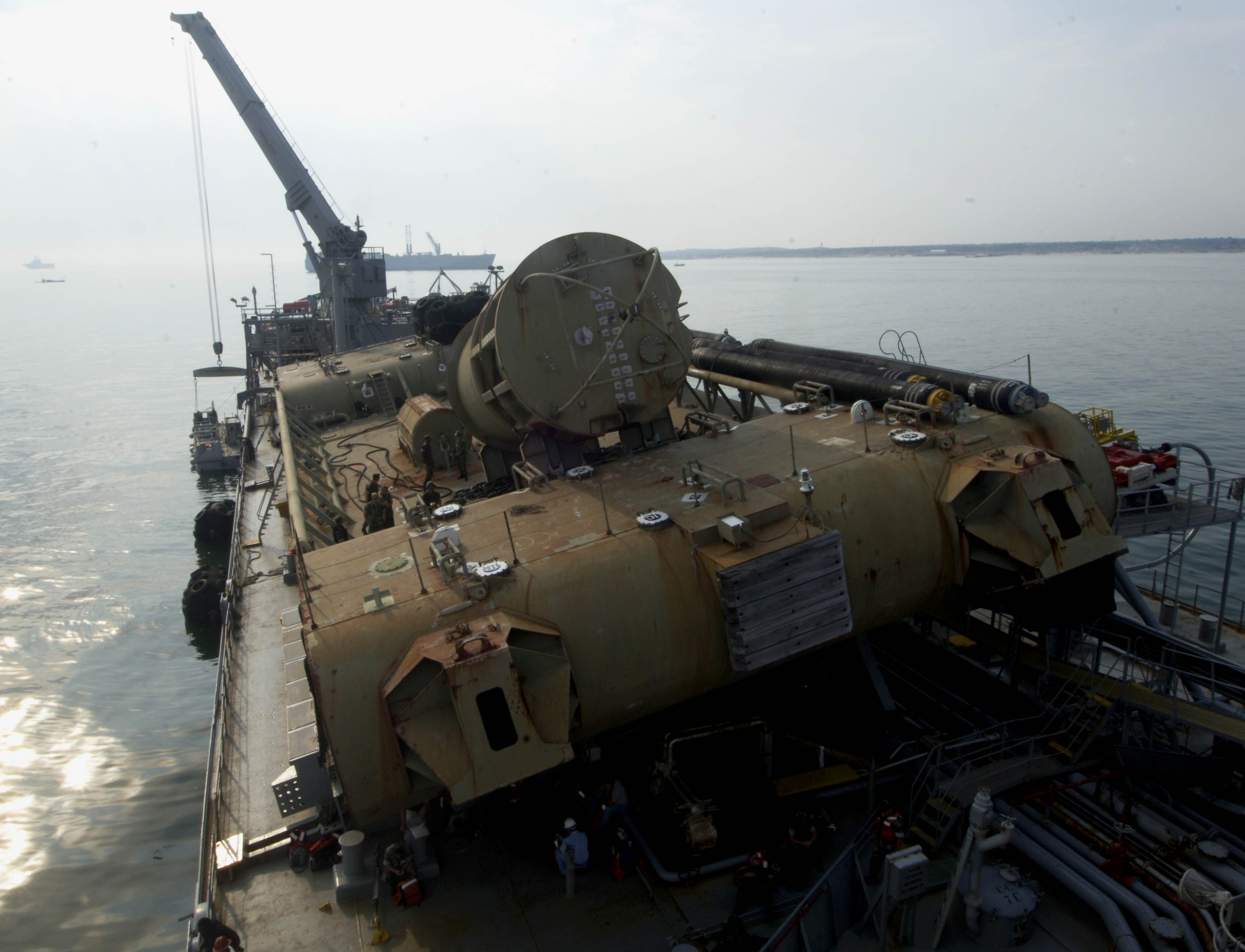
Chesapeake deck view of SALM

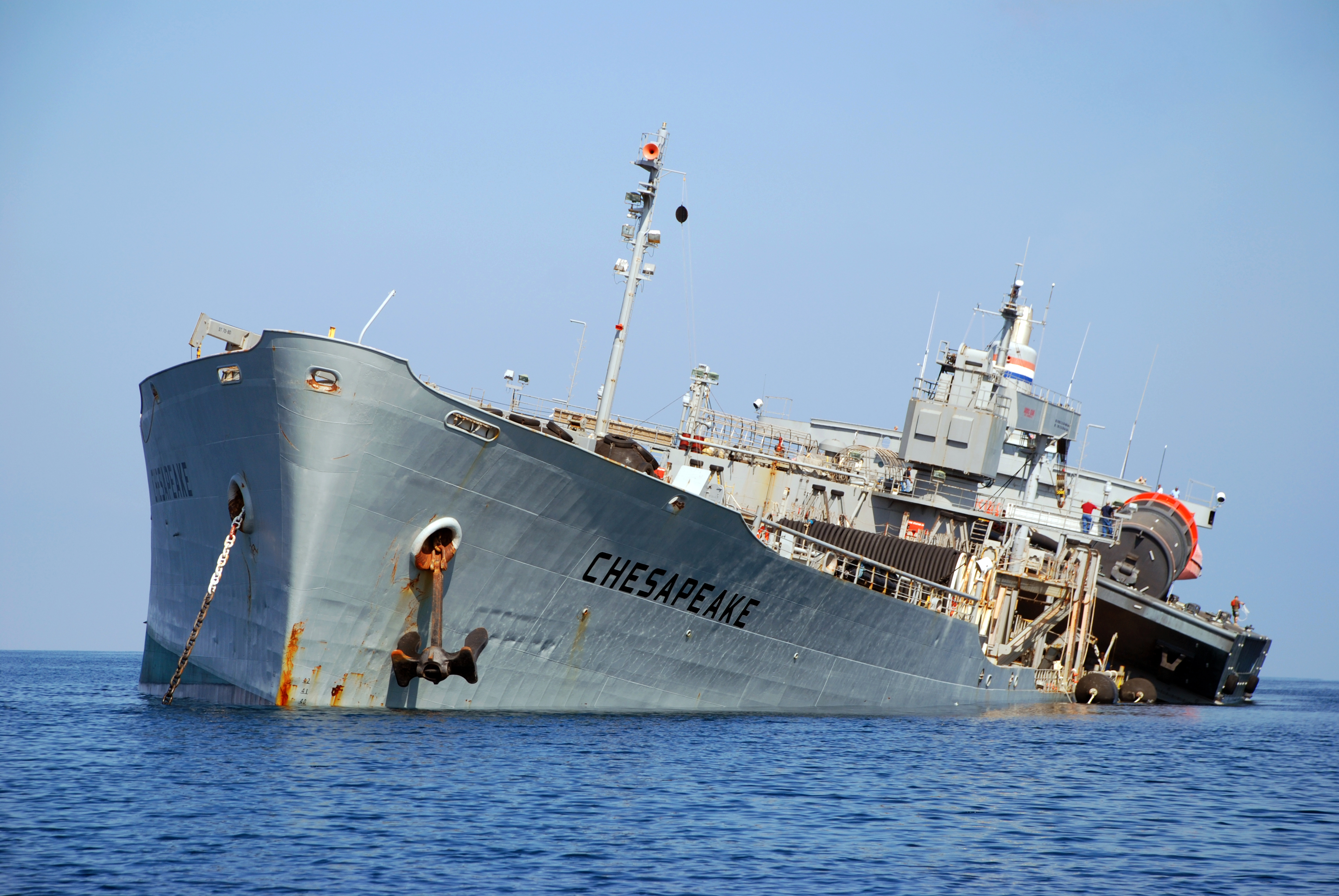
Chesapeake deploying SALM
