= Sam Houston High School =

Sam Houston High School may refer to a high school in the United States, named after Sam Houston:

- Sam Houston High School (Arlington, Texas)
- Sam Houston High School (Houston), now known as Sam Houston Math, Science, and Technology Center
- Sam Houston High School (Louisiana)
- Sam Houston High School (San Antonio, Texas)
