= Houston Street Line =

Houston Street Line may refer to:

- Houston Street Line (surface), a bus route in Manhattan, New York City
- Houston–Essex Street Line, a rapid-transit line in Manhattan, New York City
