= Houston Township =

Houston Township may refer to the following townships in the United States:

- Houston Township, Adams County, Illinois
- Houston Township, Houston County, Minnesota
