= Matthew Hueston House =

Historic house in Ohio, United States

- U.S. National Register of Historic Places
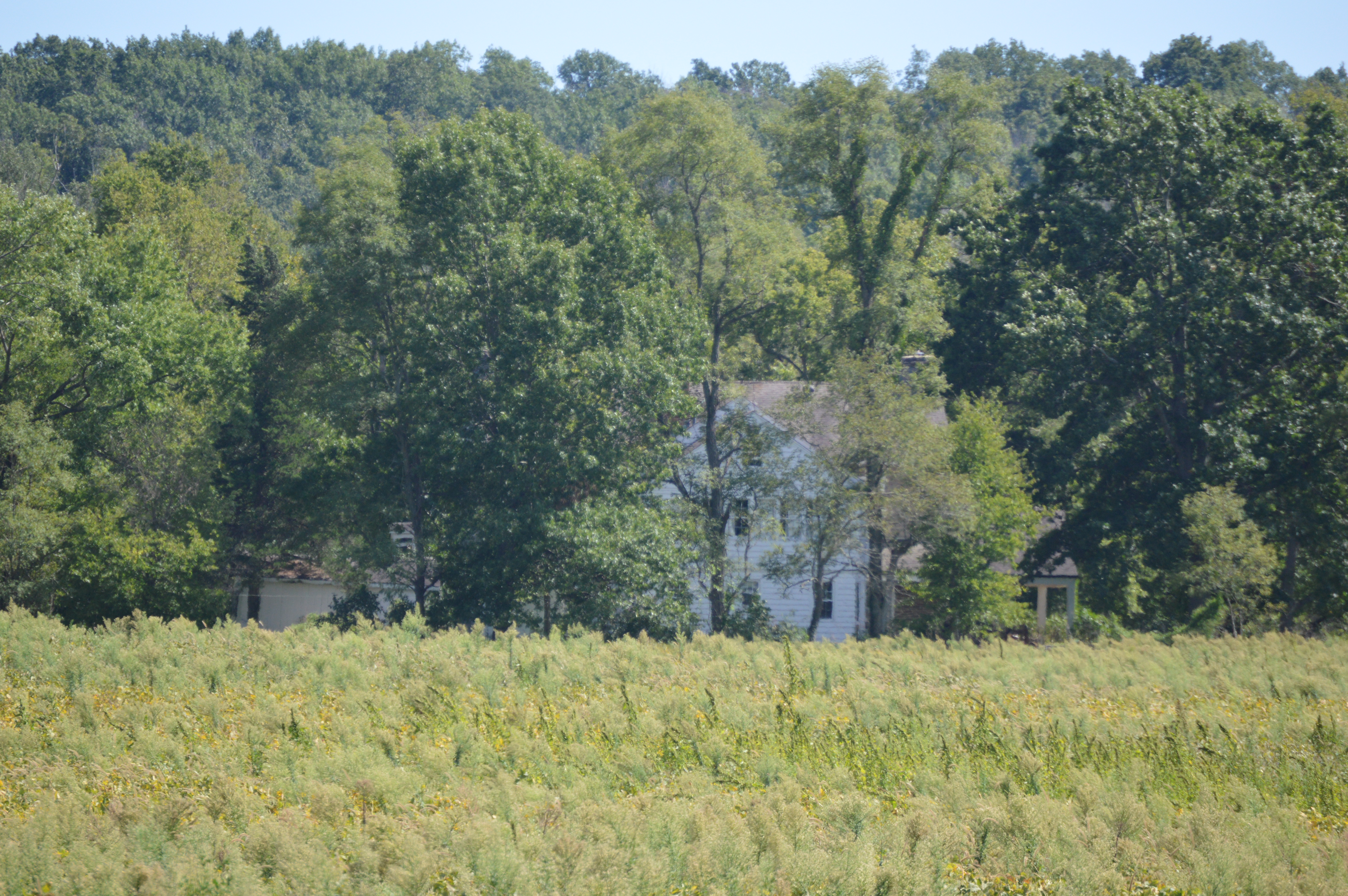
- Distant view from the west in 2016

- Location within Ohio Location within the United States
- Location: 1320 Four–Mile Creek Rd., Hanover Township, Ohio
- Nearest city: Hamilton, Ohio
- Coordinates: 39°27′59.10″N 84°36′27.48″W
- Built: 1808–1813
- Architect: Matthew Hueston
- NRHP reference No.: 77001045
- Added to NRHP: 16 September 1977

Matthew Hueston House is a historic house located near Hamilton, Ohio, US.

== Description and history ==
Construction of the house began in 1808 and was completed in 1813. It is located at 1320 Four-Mile Creek Road in the Hanover Township. The original plan for the building was a simple rectangle of coursed stone. The facade has five bays with a recessed doorway in the center. The door has a single light transom and stone voussoir. The six over six light windows were set deeply in wood frames and had stone sills and voussoirs. The two gable ends both had a large interior chimney and two square windows. Additions and alterations have been made to the original one story stone house. A classical architrave was added to the entry in 1939. It has also been known as The Davidson House.

== Matthew Hueston ==
Matthew Hueston, whose father was killed by Native Americans when he was ten, was an early settler of the Northwest Territory. He went on to become among the first and largest landowners in Butler County. Hueston was Justice of the Peace for Hanover and Fairfield Townships, County Commissioner for Butler County from 1826 to 1835. He was on the board of directors of the Bank of Hamilton, and for fourteen years of the Miami Bridge Company. He lived in the house until the mid-1830s.

The house was listed in the National Register of Historic Places on September 16, 1977.

== See also ==
- Glossary of architecture
- Historic preservation
- History of Ohio
- Stonemasonry
