= William Clarence Hueston Sr. =

American lawyer

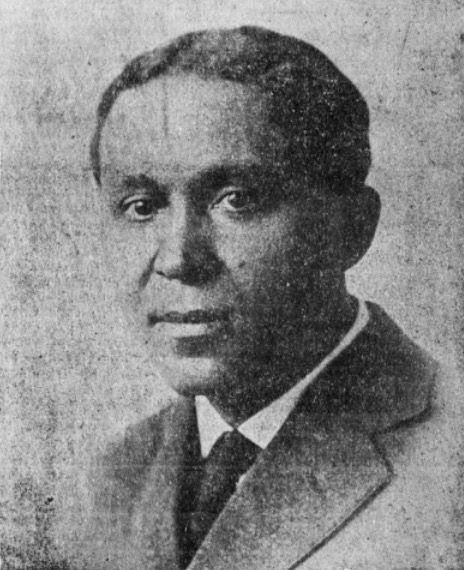

Magistrate in the Gary Magistrate Court
- In office 1924–1930

President of the National Negro Baseball League
- In office 1927–1931
- Preceded by: Rube Foster
- Succeeded by: Reuben Jackson

Assistant Solicitor in the United States Post Office Department
- In office 1930–1933

Personal details
- Born: September 24, 1880 Lexington, Kentucky, US
- Died: November 25, 1961 (aged 81) Washington, D.C., US
- Spouse: Jennie Hueston
- Children: 3
- Education: University of Kansas (BA) University of Chicago (JD)

William Clarence Hueston Sr. (September 24, 1880 – November 25, 1961) was an American lawyer, magistrate, and community leader. Hueston was the first African-American graduate from the University of Chicago Law School. He served as the first African-American judge in Gary, Indiana, as president of the Negro National Baseball League, and as the first African-American Assistant Solicitor in the United States Post Office Department within the Hoover administration. Hueston practiced law in private firms and was an influential activist for African-American civil rights throughout his life. An active member of fraternal organizations, Hueston served as education commissioner and grand secretary within the Improved Benevolent and Protective Order of the Elks of the World.

== Personal life ==
Hueston was born and raised in Lexington, Kentucky. After graduating from Chandler Normal School, Hueston's family moved to Kansas City, Kansas, where he was an active, prominent leader in the African American community. He graduated from the University of Kansas in 1904. Hueston then became the first African American graduate from the University of Chicago's Law School. Hueston was a dedicated member of fraternities and community-based organizations, serving in his younger years as Grand master in the Indiana Mason society and as a member of Sigma Psi Phi. In 1910, Hueston married his wife Jennie, who also participated in the legal and civic fields. In his lifetime, he had three children with his wife, Peggy, William Jr, and Harry.

== Career ==
=== Early career ===
After graduating law school, Hueston practiced law commercially for nearly a decade in the Kansas City area. Many news publications give Hueston credit for the reportedly brilliant defense he gave of Dr. Leroy Bundy, who, under Hueston's counsel, successfully appealed a murder conviction he received for his involvement in a Kansas City riot in 1919. In 1928, Hueston was unanimously voted a lifelong member of the Harlan Law Club in Detroit, Michigan, for his outstanding legal contributions. Hueston was appointed as a District Judge of Gary, Indiana, in 1924, making him the first African American to ever hold the position. Hueston became a leading figure of Gary's African American community, and he is credited with contributing significantly to the creation of the black-owned Central State Bank of Gary.

In 1927, Hueston was appointed as president of the National Negro Baseball League (NNL), a position which he served for four years. During his time as President, Hueston worked extensively with the Negro Southern League, signing agreements and contracts to have Southern League games and tours integrated with the NNL. After moving to Washington, D.C. in 1930, Hueston advocated for the creation of distinct Eastern and Western components that would've comprised the NNL. Complications and a lack of unity in the league prevented Hueston and other officials in the NNL from doing any substantial work for the organization. In 1931, Hueston made the decision to resign as President to prioritize his legal career.

In 1929, Hueston was specially appointed by President Herbert Hoover to work in consultation on the construction of a National Museum of African American History and Culture through the National Memorial Association, a plan that never materialized because of a lack of funding. He served for one more year as a magistrate in Gary, Indiana, until President Hoover appointed him as Assistant Solicitor in the United States Post Office in 1930. Indiana Senator James E. Watson is credited with helping recommend Hueston for the appointment.

=== Career in Washington, D.C. ===
Hueston served under Postmaster General Walter Brown for 3 years as the head of the Property Damage and Personal Injury department, resigning in 1933 when President Franklin D. Roosevelt was elected. As a legal counsel within the department, Hueston reportedly handled over 5,000 cases in his whole tenure as Assistant Solicitor. Hueston implemented an unprecedented federal policy wherein any termination of any African American employee within the United States Post Office was to be confirmed and finalized through him.

Exiting his government position, Hueston had the option to leave Washington, D.C. for prominent law firms in Philadelphia. Instead, Hueston stayed in Washington, D.C, and established his own law firm. He is credited with adding law libraries at Howard University and the Post Office Department during the 1950s. Throughout his time in Washington, D.C, Hueston was a vocal activist for African American civil rights. Hueston often gave speeches to students and communities, and he appeared alongside notable politicians, such as Presidents Hoover and Eisenhower, to promote the fight for racial justice.

Besides his legal feats, Hueston's career work is defined by his contributions to fraternal circles. Hueston was intimately involved with the largest African American fraternity in the country of his lifetime: The Improved Benevolent and Protective Order of the Elks of the World (I.B.P.O.E.W). In 1925, the Grand Lodge of the I.B.P.O.E.W. created a Department of Education and chose Hueston to run it. Hueston served as Education Commissioner until 1951. Hueston received considerable praise throughout his service as Education Commissioner, and he is credited with establishing scholarships and oratory competitions for over 50,000 African American students across the country. In 1951, Hueston was elected to the position of Grand Secretary, a position he would hold until his retirement in 1961. Hueston is reported by many publications in the D.C. area to have been an indispensable function of the Elks’ business and political ventures between 1930 and 1960. Nine months after retiring, Hueston died in his home from a heart attack.

== Legacy ==
William C. Hueston was an influential activist and leader who affected many in multiple different paths of life. Hueston received consistent, substantial praise from newspaper publications like the Chicago Defender, the Philadelphia Tribune, and the Pittsburgh Courier for his career's work in the legal field. Hueston made contributions to the Elks fraternal organization, establishing a successful Education department that helped thousands of African American students reach college and beyond, including Martin Luther King Jr. Beyond the tangible work of his career, Hueston was, as the New Journal and Guide called him, “A man of many firsts.” Hueston dedicated much of his life to educational activism in the African American community: a University of Kansas report cites him saying, “You are not here to get an education for your own use. It is for something in which we are all interested and the question is whether or not you as representatives of the race of ours are going to measure up.”
