= SS Petersburg =

American tanker ship

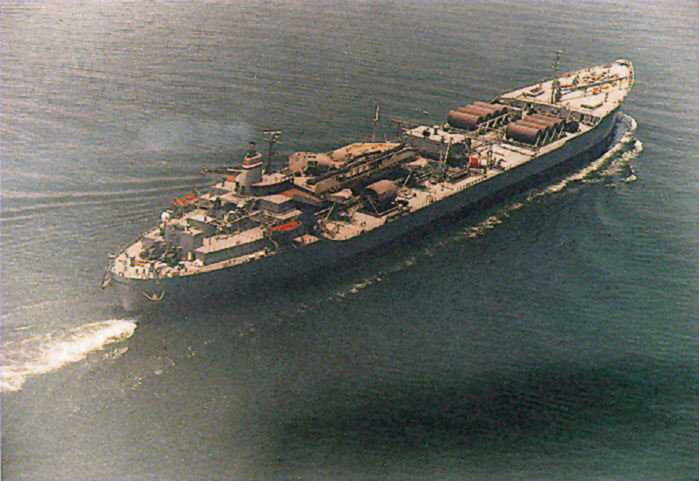

History

United States
- Ordered: 1962
- Builder: Bethlehem Steel Sparrows Point Yard, Baltimore, MD.
- Launched: 2 April 1963
- Sponsored by: Sinclair Oil Co.
- Christened: 1963 ST Sinclair Texas
- In service: 28 June 1963, Dover Tanker Corp.
- Out of service: 22 September 2020
- Renamed: Petersburg 27 July 1981
- Stricken: 3 June 2021
- Homeport: Alameda, CA
- Identification: IMO number: 6329044; MMSI number: 368102000; Callsign: WJDC
- Fate: Scrapped 6 June 2022

General characteristics
- Class & type: Chesapeake Class Tanker
- Tonnage: 27,049 GT
- Displacement: 50,063 long tons
- Length: 736 ft (224 m)
- Beam: 102 ft (31 m)
- Draught: 40 ft 1 in (12.22 m)
- Speed: 14.5 knots
- Complement: Civilian: 38 • Military: 0

SS Petersburg (T-AOT-9101) was one of Military Sealift Command's US Government-owned tankers. It had been part of Maritime Prepositioning Ship Squadron Three. Its normal crew complement was 38 civilians and no military personnel.

== History ==
SS Petersburg was part of the Ready Reserve Force. She was scrapped in June 2022. Previously, she was berthed in the Suisun Bay Reserve fleet, Benicia, California; prior to that she had served ten years at the island of Guam. In June 2006, the ship participated in exercise Valiant Shield. The ship occasionally left berth in the ready reserve fleet to participate in active and operational training and exercises.

Originally built in 1963, the Petersburg was one in a fleet of five tankers fitted with an offshore petroleum discharge system. She could carry up to 225,000 barrels of JP8 fuel.

Offshore Petroleum Distribution System (OPDS) provides a semipermanent, all-weather facility for bulk transfer of refined bulk petroleum (e.g., JP5 and JP8) directly from an offshore tanker to a beach termination unit (BTU) located immediately inland from the high-water mark. POL then is either transported inland or stored in the beach support area. Major OPDS components are: the OPDS tanker with booster pumps and spread mooring winches, a recoverable single-anchor leg mooring (SALM) to accommodate four tankers up to 70,000 DWT, ship to SALM hose lines, up to four miles of six-inch (internal diameter) conduit for pumping to the beach, and two BTUs to interface with the shoreside systems.

Three of the tankers (SS Petersburg, SS Chesapeake, and SS Mount Washington) contained a crane and stowage cradles for five OPDS utility boats (OUBs) (modified LCM-6s). OUB-equipped tankers carried adequate SLWT outfitting to equip one SLWT as a towtug and one SLWT as a lay repair boat carry one complete tanker terminal, and were equipped with five OUBs to deploy it. These tankers also had a maximum 59 LT capacity crane to load/offload the five OUBs carried on board.

== Gallery ==
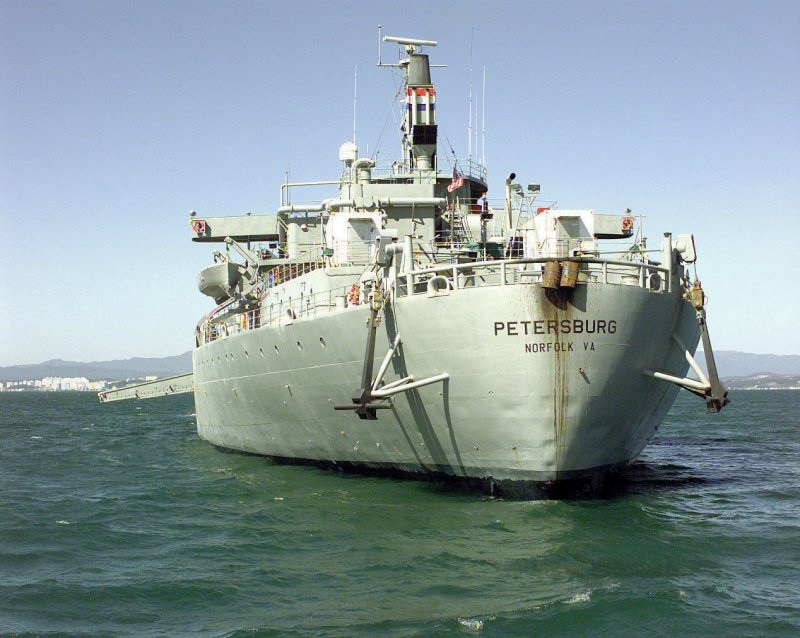
SS Petersburg, (T-AOT-9101), Petersburg Stern View

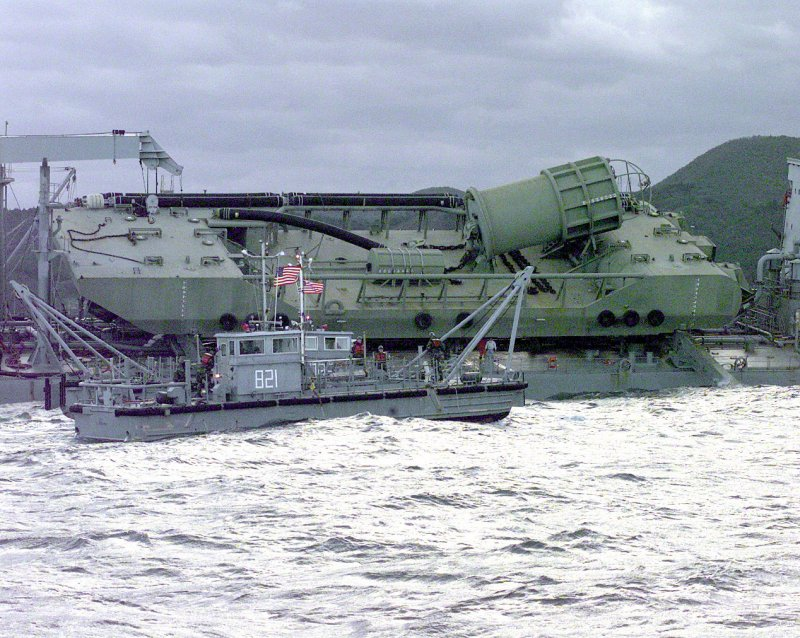
SS Petersburg, (T-AOT-9101), Petersburg launching the SALM

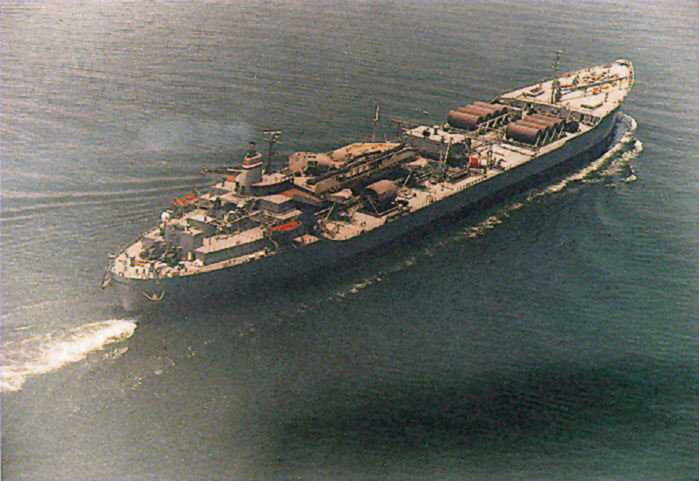
SS Petersburg, (T-AOT-9101), Petersburg
