= Morgan–Hueston House =

Historic house in Ohio, United States

- U.S. National Register of Historic Places
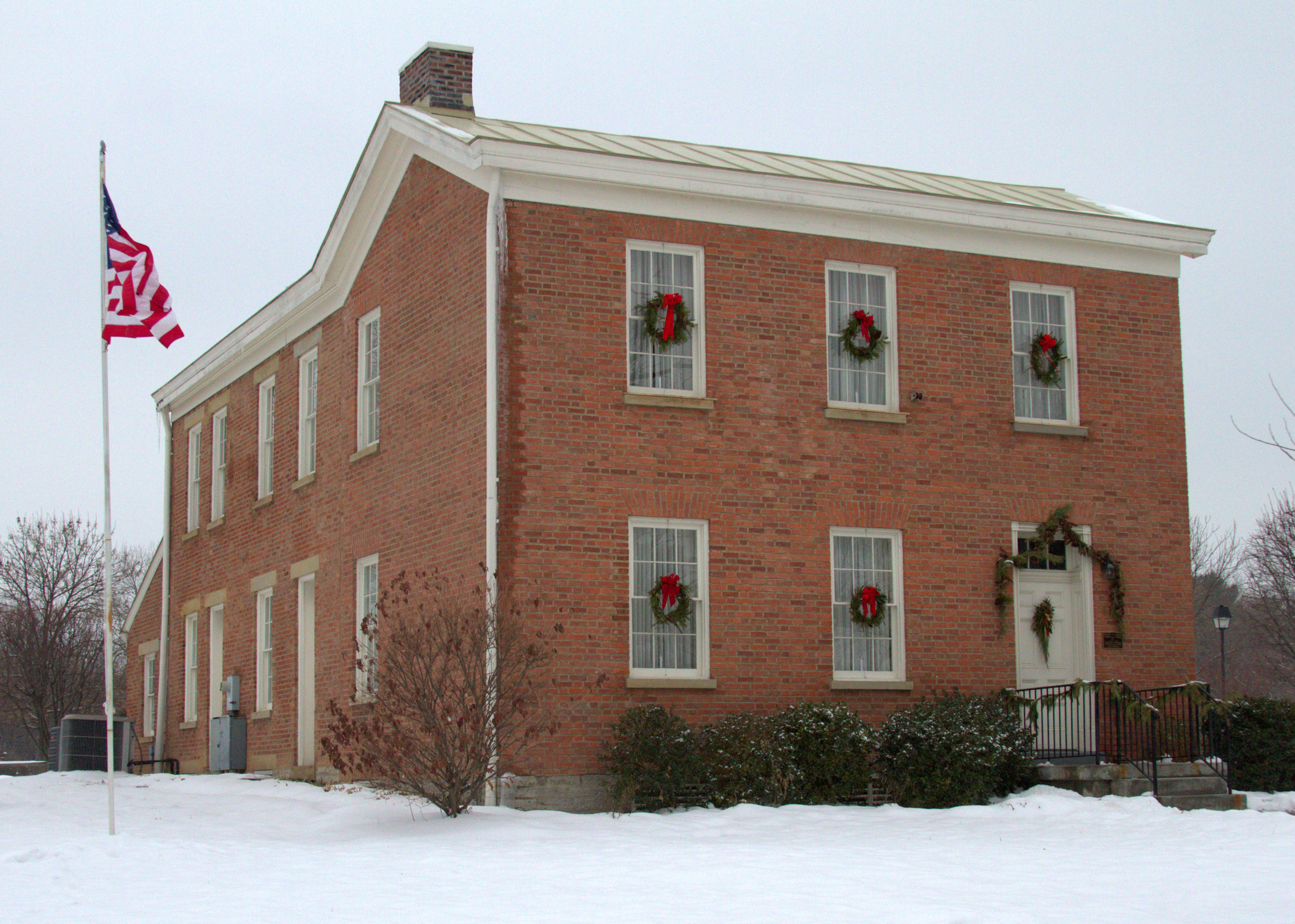
- Location: Fairfield, Ohio
- Coordinates: 39°18′39″N 84°30′18″W
- Architectural style: Federal and Greek Revival
- NRHP reference No.: 90001495
- Added to NRHP: 1990-10-01

Morgan–Hueston House is a registered historic building in Fairfield, Ohio, listed in the National Register on 1 October 1990.

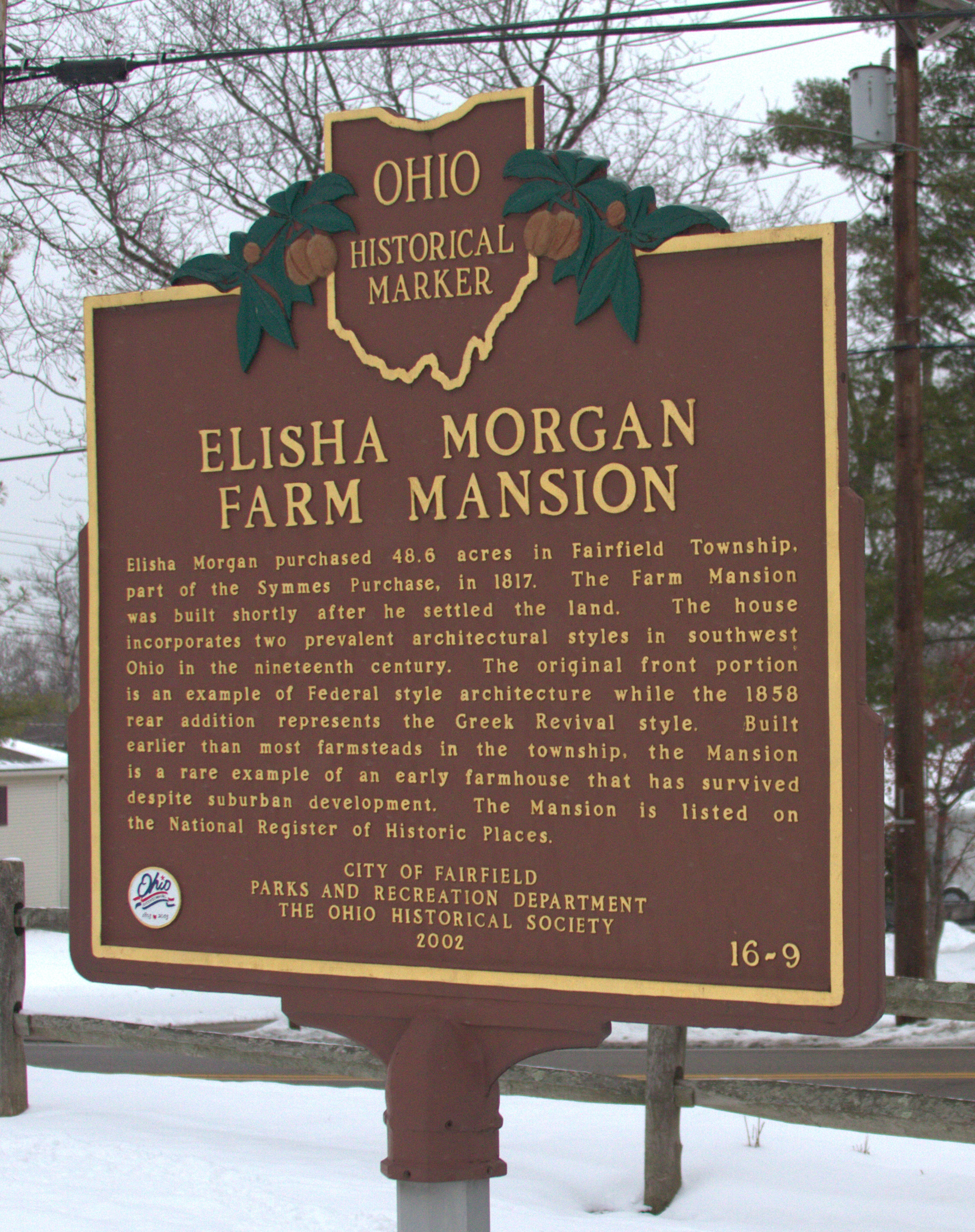
Morgan Farm Historical Marker

== Historic uses ==
- Single Dwelling
