= USS Houston (AK-1) =

Cargo ship of the United States Navy

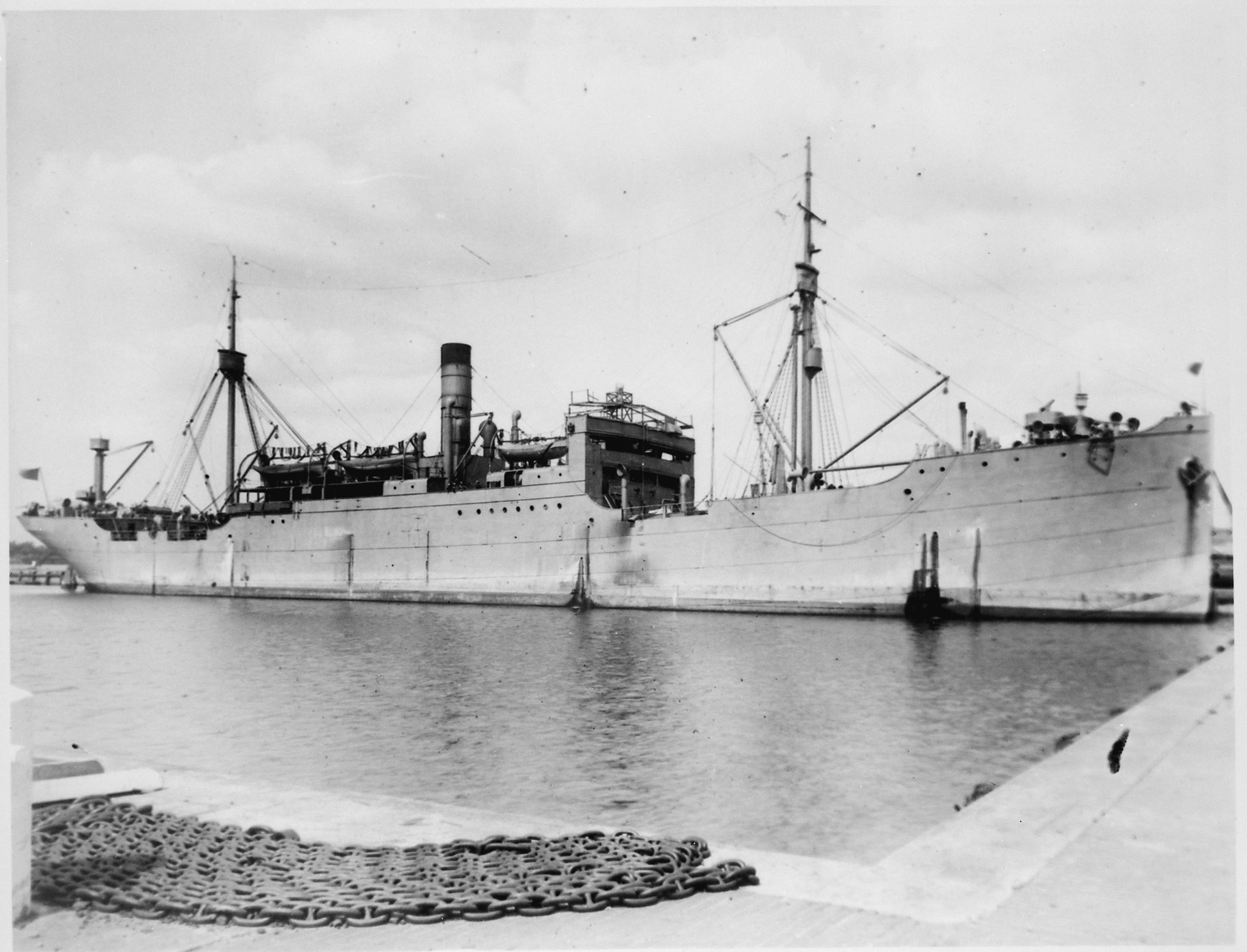
- Houston in 1918

History

German Empire
- Name: Liebenfels
- Namesake: Liebenfels
- Owner: DDG Hansa
- Builder: Bremer Vulcan, Vegesack, Germany
- Laid down: 1902-1903
- Launched: 11 April 1903
- Completed: 1903
- Fate: Scuttled by crew 1 February 1917

History

United States
- Name: Houston
- Namesake: Houston
- Builder: Raised and entered Charleston Navy Yard for conversion to Naval service
- Acquired: 20 March 1917
- Commissioned: 17 July 1920
- Decommissioned: 23 March 1922
- Stricken: date unknown
- Identification: Hull symbol:AK-1
- Fate: Sold, 27 September 1922, to Frank M. Warren of Portland, OR, renamed SS North King in 1923; Sold to Campania Diana de Vapores S.A., Panama, date unknown; Chartered by the War Shipping Administration (WSA) from Campania Diana de Vapores S.A., 30 December 1941, at New York, N.Y., Transferred to United States Lines Co. for operation, 30 December 1941; Returned to Campania Diana de Vapores S.A., 26 February 1946, at New York, N.Y.; Sold to Japanese breakers Y. Yamamoto & Co., Osaka, Japan, scrapped in 1958

General characteristics
- Displacement: 4,525 t (4,454 long tons) (standard); 9,000 t (8,900 long tons) (full load)
- Length: 392 ft (119 m)
- Beam: 50 ft 9 in (15.47 m)
- Draft: 25 ft 4 in (7.72 m)
- Propulsion: coal fired boilers, engine type unknown, single propeller
- Speed: 11 kn (13 mph; 20 km/h)
- Complement: 145
- Armament: 4 × 3 in (76 mm)/23 caliber guns

USS Houston (AK-1) was a cargo ship that was acquired by the U.S. Navy for service in World War I. During World War II, she served as a commercial cargo ship under charter to the United States Lines by the War Shipping Administration.

== Acquiring a scuttled German freighter ==
The first Navy ship to be named Houston, AK-1 was the former German freighter SS Liebenfels, built by Bremer Vulcan, Vegesack, Germany, in 1903. Operated by the Hansa Line, she arrived at Charleston, South Carolina, in August 1914, and remained there until 1 February 1917, when her German crew scuttled her. Finding her sunk and abandoned, U.S. authorities set about to raise the ship and took her to Charleston Navy Yard for refitting on 20 March 1917. She was commissioned as Houston (AK-1) on 3 July 1917.

== World War I North Atlantic operations ==
Assigned to the transport service, Houston departed Charleston 11 July 1917, loaded coal and oil at Hampton Roads, and joined a convoy sailing from New York on 7 August 1917. She arrived at Brest on 25 August and subsequently made four voyages to and from New York transporting radio equipment, trucks, airplanes, and general supplies. Returning to New York on 18 November 1918, the ship was assigned to the Naval Overseas Transportation Service, and made four more voyages between the East and West coasts of the United States, departing on the first of these 15 December 1918 from New York. Until her return to New York 14 April 1921 Houston carried coal, ordnance, lumber, and general supplies between the coasts in support of the Navy's two-ocean operations.

== Post-war assignment to the Pacific ==
Houston was next assigned to trans-Pacific duty. She sailed from New York on 4 May 1921, took on cargo at Philadelphia, Pennsylvania, and Norfolk, and steamed by way of San Francisco, California, Pearl Harbor and Guam to Manila, arriving 22 October 1921. The ship departed Cavite on 16 November 1921, and arrived San Francisco on 11 January 1922.

== Decommissioning ==
USS Houston was decommissioned on 23 March 1922, and was sold on 27 September 1922 to Frank M. Warren of Portland, Oregon. It was renamed SS North King in 1923. She was sold to Campania Diana de Vapores S.A., Panama, date unknown. When the U.S. entered World War II, she was chartered by the War Shipping Administration (WSA) from Campania Diana de Vapores S.A., 30 December 1941, at New York, New York. She was then transferred to United States Lines Co. for operation on 30 December 1941. At war’s end, she was returned to Campania Diana de Vapores S.A. on 26 February 1946, at New York City. Final disposition: scrapped in 1958.

== Military awards and honors ==
Houston’s crew members were authorized the following medals:

- World War I Victory Medal (with Transport clasp)
- Yangtze Service Medal
