= Euston =

Euston (/ˈjuːstən/ YOO-stən) may refer to:

== Places ==
- Euston, New South Wales, Australia
- Euston, Suffolk, England
- Euston Road, London
- Euston Square, London
- Euston, London

== Stations in London ==
- Euston bus station
- Euston railway station
- Euston tube station
- Euston Square tube station

== See also ==
- Euston Arch, former arch that stood in front of the London railway station
- Euston Films, British film and television production company
- Euston Hall, Suffolk
- Euston Tower, London
- Euston Manifesto, named for Euston Road
- Earl of Euston, title of the Duke of Grafton
