= Huston =

Huston may refer to:

== Places ==
=== United States ===
- Huston Township, Blair County, Pennsylvania
- Huston Township, Centre County, Pennsylvania
- Huston Township, Clearfield County, Pennsylvania

== People with given name ==
- Huston Quin, former mayor of Louisville, Kentucky, United States
- Huston Smith, American religious scholar
- Huston Street, American retired baseball player

== People with the surname ==
- Anjelica Huston (born 1951), an American actress
- Charlie Huston, writer
- Danny Huston (born 1962), American actor and director
- Eli Huston (c. 1799–1835), associate justice of the Supreme Court of Mississippi
- Jack Huston (born 1982), English actor
- James N. Huston (1849–1927), American politician from Indiana
- John Huston (1906–1987), American actor, producer and director
- Jonathan Huston, Australian politician
- Joseph Miller Huston (1866-1940), American architect
- Joseph W. Huston (1833–1905), associate justice and chief justice of the Idaho Supreme Court
- Margo Huston, (born 1943) American reporter
- Nyjah Huston, American professional skateboarder
- Patrick Huston (born 1996), British archer
- Perdita Huston, women's rights activist
- Roger Huston (born 1942), harness race announcer
- Samuel B. Huston (1858–1920), American politician from Oregon
- Tillinghast L' Hommedieu Huston (1867-1938), American businessman, owner of New York Yankees circa 1915
- Tony Huston (born 1950), American actor
- Victor Huston (1890–1941), British Empire military pilot
- Walter Huston (1883–1950), a Canadian-born American actor

== See also ==
- Houston (disambiguation)
