= USS Houston (SSN-713) =

Los Angeles-class nuclear-powered attack submarine of the US Navy

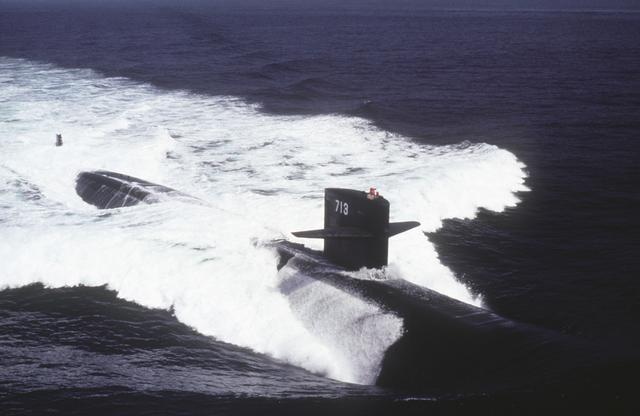
- USS Houston underway

History

United States
- Name: USS Houston
- Namesake: City of Houston, Texas
- Awarded: 1 August 1975
- Builder: Newport News Shipbuilding
- Laid down: 29 January 1979
- Launched: 21 March 1981
- Commissioned: 25 September 1982
- Decommissioned: 26 August 2016
- Stricken: 26 August 2016
- Home port: Bremerton, Washington
- Motto: Semper Vigilans; (Latin: Always Vigilant)
- Status: Undergoing recycling
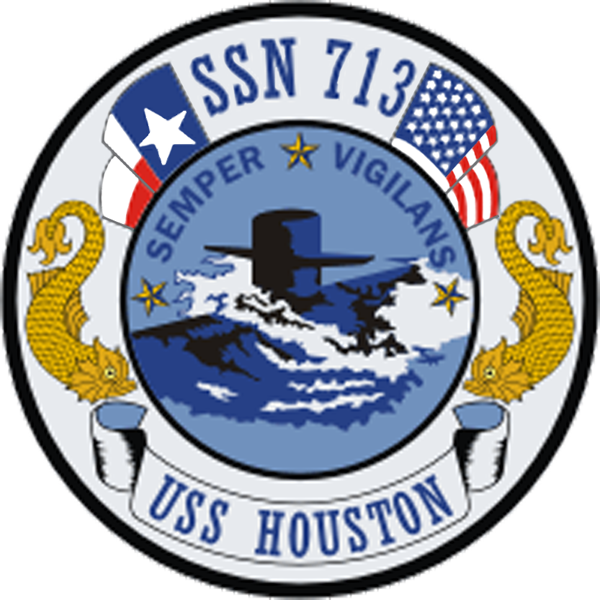
- Badge

General characteristics
- Class & type: Los Angeles-class submarine
- Displacement: 5,744 tons light, 6,103 tons full, 359 tons dead
- Length: 110.3 m (361 ft 11 in)
- Beam: 10 m (32 ft 10 in)
- Draft: 9.7 m (31 ft 10 in)
- Depth: 1599
- Propulsion: S6G nuclear reactor
- Complement: 12 officers, 98 enlisted
- Armament: 4 × 21 in (533 mm) torpedo tubes

USS Houston (SSN-713), a Los Angeles-class attack submarine, was the fourth ship of the United States Navy to be named for Houston, Texas. The contract to build her was awarded to Newport News Shipbuilding and Dry Dock Company in Newport News, Virginia on 1 August 1975 and her keel was laid down on 29 January 1979. She was launched on 21 March 1981 sponsored by Barbara Bush, wife of then Vice-President of the United States George H. W. Bush. Houston was commissioned on 25 September 1982. Notably, her hull number matches her namesake city's original telephone area code.

== History ==
USS Houston was featured in the motion picture "The Hunt for Red October" representing USS Dallas (SSN-700). As the storyline went, she executed an "emergency blow" to avoid the enemy torpedoes fired at the Soviet submarine Red October. This was done by forcing high pressure air into her ballast tanks, bringing extreme buoyancy, and causing her to literally "leap" from the water.

Author Robert D. Kaplan embedded aboard the ship in the spring of 2005 and recounted his experiences in her for his book Hog Pilots, Blue Water Grunts in Chapter Four "Geeks with Tattoos: The Most Driven Men I have Ever Known."

=== 2008 radiation leak ===
On 1 August 2008 the Navy reported to CNN that Houston was found to have been leaking radioactive water for months while on patrol and visiting stations in Japan, Guam and Hawaii. The problem was discovered the previous month during servicing at Pearl Harbor. One crewman was exposed to radioactive water but not injured. The Navy reported that the Houston's leak released only a "negligible" amount of radioactivity. The Navy later expanded the estimated time the leak existed to nearly two years, although they maintained the amount of radioactivity leaked was very small – "less than a smoke detector".

=== Final deployment ===
On 28 October 2015, Houston moored in Pearl Harbor, after completing her final scheduled deployment. She was decommissioned on 26 August 2016 in a ceremony at Naval Base Kitsap—Bangor. Since September 21, 2015, she has been in the process of being defueled.
