= Results of the 1913 Tasmanian state election (House of Assembly) =

This is a list of House of Assembly results for the 1913 Tasmanian election.

== Results by division ==
=== Bass ===
1913 Tasmanian state election: Bass
Party	Candidate	Votes	%	±%
Quota		1,968		
Labor	George Becker (elected 2)	2,039	14.8	+5.9
Labor	Arthur Anderson (elected 3)	1,974	14.3	+14.3
Labor	Charles Howroyd (elected 4)	1,788	13.0	−6.0
Labor	Allan Guy	1,131	8.2	−1.0
Liberal	Albert Solomon (elected 1)	2,909	21.1	+2.1
Liberal	John Hayes (elected 5)	1,643	11.9	+11.9
Liberal	Richard McKenzie	1,157	8.4	+1.7
Liberal	Robert Sadler (elected 6)	1,130	8.2	+1.3
Total formal votes		13,771	97.5	+0.1
Informal votes		351	2.5	−0.1
Turnout		14,122	66.7	−5.1
Party total votes
Labor		6,932	50.3	+1.4
Liberal		6,839	49.7	−1.4

=== Darwin ===
1913 Tasmanian state election: Darwin
Party	Candidate	Votes	%	±%
Quota		1,803		
Labor	James Ogden (elected 4)	1,751	13.9	+0.6
Labor	James Belton (elected 1)	1,736	13.8	−0.9
Labor	Benjamin Watkins (elected 6)	1,426	11.3	+2.7
Labor	James Hurst	1,372	10.9	+0.4
Labor	David Jones	156	1.2	+0.4
Liberal	Joshua Whitsitt (elected 3)	1,528	12.1	−3.2
Liberal	Herbert Payne (elected 2)	1,484	11.8	−2.9
Liberal	George Pullen (elected 5)	1,341	10.6	+1.6
Liberal	Kenric Laughton	1,079	8.6	+11.5
Liberal	William Lamerton	742	5.9	−2.3
Total formal votes		13,492	96.9	−0.1
Informal votes		400	3.1	+0.1
Turnout		13,892	62.6	−6.2
Party total votes
Labor		6,441	51.1	+3.9
Liberal		6,174	48.9	−3.9

=== Denison ===
1913 Tasmanian state election: Denison
Party	Candidate	Votes	%	±%
Quota		2,122		
Liberal	Elliott Lewis (elected 1)	2,292	15.4	−1.5
Liberal	Sir John Davies (elected 2)	1,902	12.8	+4.2
Liberal	William Fullerton (elected 4)	1,321	8.9	+8.9
Liberal	Francis Valentine	1,011	6.8	+0.3
Liberal	Frederick Rattle	620	4.2	+1.0
Liberal	William Bottrill	369	2.5	+2.5
Liberal	John Paterson	202	1.4	+1.4
Labor	Lyndhurst Giblin (elected 3)	1,760	11.9	+11.9
Labor	Walter Woods (elected 5)	1,393	9.4	−6.3
Labor	Vincent Barker (elected 6)	1,294	8.7	+1.7
Labor	William Sheridan	1,027	6.9	−5.8
Labor	Henry Edmonds	764	5.1	−1.4
Labor	Newham Waterworth	502	3.4	−0.5
Labor	Edward O'Brien	392	2.6	+2.6
Total formal votes		14,849	96.8	−0.5
Informal votes		491	3.2	+0.5
Turnout		15,340	68.8	−8.6
Party total votes
Liberal		7,717	52.0	+0.9
Labor		7,132	48.0	−0.9

=== Franklin ===
1913 Tasmanian state election: Franklin
Party	Candidate	Votes	%	±%
Quota		2,178		
Liberal	Arthur Cotton (elected 2)	2,897	19.0	+11.5
Liberal	John Evans (elected 3)	2,007	13.2	+1.1
Liberal	Norman Ewing (elected 4)	1,747	11.5	−0.9
Liberal	Alexander Hean	1,422	9.3	−2.8
Liberal	Alfred McDermott	493	3.2	+3.2
Labor	John Earle (elected 1)	3,234	21.2	−1.4
Labor	George Martin (elected 5)	1,573	5.0	−5.4
Labor	Frederick Banks	950	6.2	+6.2
Labor	David Dicker (elected 6)	920	6.0	−5.2
Total formal votes		15,243	96.8	−0.4
Informal votes		496	3.2	+0.4
Turnout		15,739	71.2	−6.4
Party total votes
Liberal		8,566	56.2	−1.1
Labor		6,677	43.8	+1.1

=== Wilmot ===
1913 Tasmanian state election: Wilmot
Party	Candidate	Votes	%	±%
Quota		1,756		
Liberal	Edward Mulcahy (elected 2)	1,961	16.0	−3.7
Liberal	Herbert Hays (elected 3)	1,506	12.3	+0.5
Liberal	Walter Lee (elected 4)	1,456	11.8	−2.2
Liberal	Jonathan Best (elected 5)	1,163	9.5	+0.4
Liberal	Horace Walduck	775	6.3	+6.3
Labor	Joseph Lyons (elected 1)	2,198	17.9	+0.0
Labor	William Shoobridge	1,245	10.1	+10.1
Labor	Michael O'Keefe (elected 6)	1,008	8.2	+3.2
Independent	Norman Cameron	977	8.0	−2.6
Total formal votes		12,289	97.6	+0.9
Informal votes		297	2.4	−0.9
Turnout		12,586	66.4	−4.8
Party total votes
Liberal		6,861	55.8	−10.2
Labor		4,451	36.2	+2.0
Independent	Norman Cameron	977	8.0	−2.6

== See also ==
- 1913 Tasmanian state election
- Members of the Tasmanian House of Assembly, 1913–1916
- Candidates of the 1913 Tasmanian state election
