= Candidates of the 1913 Tasmanian state election =

The 1913 Tasmanian state election was held on 23 January 1913.

== Retiring Members ==
=== Liberal ===
- Thomas Bakhap MHA (Bass)

== House of Assembly ==
Sitting members are shown in bold text. Tickets that elected at least one MHA are highlighted in the relevant colour. Successful candidates are indicated by an asterisk (*).

=== Bass ===
Six seats were up for election. The Labor Party was defending three seats. The Liberal Party was defending three seats.

Labor candidates	Liberal candidates
Arthur Anderson*; **George Becker***; **James Guy**; **Charles Howroyd***	John Hayes*; **Richard McKenzie**; Robert Sadler*; **Albert Solomon***

=== Darwin ===
Six seats were up for election. The Labor Party was defending three seats. The Liberal Party was defending three seats.

Labor candidates	Liberal candidates
**James Belton***; James Hurst; David Jones; **James Ogden***; **Benjamin Watkins***	William Lamerton; Kenric Laughton; **Herbert Payne***; **George Pullen***; **Joshua Whitsitt***

=== Denison ===
Six seats were up for election. The Labor Party was defending four seats. The Liberal Party was defending two seats.

Labor candidates	Liberal candidates
**Vincent Barker***; Henry Edmonds; Lyndhurst Giblin*; Edward O'Brien; **William Sheridan**; Newham Waterworth; **Walter Woods***	William Bottrill; **Sir John Davies***; William Fullerton*; **Sir Elliott Lewis***; John Paterson; Frederick Rattle; **Francis Valentine**

=== Franklin ===
Six seats were up for election. The Labor Party was defending three seats. The Liberal Party was defending three seats.

Labor candidates	Liberal candidates
Frederick Banks; **David Dicker***; **John Earle***; **George Martin***	Arthur Cotton*; **John Evans***; **Norman Ewing***; **Alexander Hean**; Alfred McDermott

=== Wilmot ===
Six seats were up for election. The Labor Party was defending two seats. The Liberal Party was defending four seats, although Norman Cameron was running as an independent.

Labor candidates	Liberal candidates	Independent candidates
**Joseph Lyons***; **Michael O'Keefe***; William Shoobridge	Jonathan Best*; **Herbert Hays***; **Walter Lee***; **Edward Mulcahy***; Horace Walduck	**Norman Cameron**

== See also ==
- Members of the Tasmanian House of Assembly, 1912–1913
- Members of the Tasmanian House of Assembly, 1913–1916
