= Members of the Tasmanian House of Assembly, 1913–1916 =

This is a list of members of the Tasmanian House of Assembly between the 23 January 1913 election and the 25 March 1916 election. On 6 April 1914, John Earle, leader of the Labor Party, formed a government and led for the rest of the term.

Name	Party	Division	Years in office
Arthur Anderson^{[6]}	Labor	Bass	1913–1915
Vincent Barker	Labor	Denison	1912–1916
George Becker	Labor	Bass	1912–1931; 1934–1941
James Belton	Labor	Darwin	1909–1931
Jonathan Best^{[1]}	Liberal	Wilmot	1894–1897; 1899–1912; 1913
Ernest Blyth^{[1]}	Liberal	Wilmot	1913–1925
Arthur Cotton	Liberal	Franklin	1913–1916; 1917–1919
John Davies^{[3]}	Liberal	Denison	1884–1913
David Dicker	Labor	Franklin	1909–1922
John Earle	Labor	Franklin	1906–1917
John Evans	Liberal	Franklin	1897–1937
Norman Ewing^{[7]}	Liberal	Franklin	1909–1915
William Fullerton	Liberal	Denison	1913–1919
Lyndhurst Giblin	Labor	Denison	1913–1916
John Hayes	Liberal	Bass	1913–1923
Herbert Hays	Liberal	Wilmot	1911–1922
Charles Howroyd	Labor	Bass	1906–1917
Walter Lee	Liberal	Wilmot	1909–1946
Elliott Lewis	Liberal	Denison	1886–1903; 1909–1922
Joseph Lyons	Labor	Wilmot	1909–1929
James McDonald	Labor	Bass	1915–1916
Alexander Marshall^{[5]}	Liberal	Bass	1914–1925
George Martin	Labor	Franklin	1912–1916
Edward Mulcahy^{[4]}	Liberal	Wilmot	1891–1903; 1910–1919
James Ogden^{[2]}	Labor	Darwin	1906–1922
Michael O'Keefe	Labor	Wilmot	1912–1926
Herbert Payne	Liberal	Darwin	1903–1920
George Pullen	Liberal	Darwin	1912–1916; 1919–1922
Daniel Ryan^{[7]}	Liberal	Franklin	1915–1916
Robert Sadler	Liberal	Bass	1900–1912; 1913–1922
William Sheridan^{[3]}	Labor	Denison	1909–1913; 1914–1928
Albert Solomon^{[5]}	Liberal	Bass	1909–1914
Benjamin Watkins	Labor	Darwin	1906–1917; 1919–1922; 1925–1934
Joshua Whitsitt	Liberal/Independent	Darwin	1909–1922
Walter Woods	Labor	Denison	1906–1917; 1925–1931

== Notes ==
^{1} Liberal MHA for Wilmot, Jonathan Best, died on 13 May 1913. Liberal candidate Ernest Blyth was elected on 24 June 1913.
^{2} Labor MHA for Darwin, James Ogden, resigned in July 1913 and was re-elected on 5 August 1913.
^{3} Liberal MHA for Denison, John Davies, died on 12 November 1913. Labor candidate and former MHA William Sheridan was elected on 10 January 1914, resulting in the Liberals losing their majority in the House.
^{4} Liberal MHA for Wilmot, Edward Mulcahy, resigned in October 1914 and was re-elected on 7 November 1914.
^{5} Liberal MHA for Bass, Albert Solomon, died on 5 October 1914. Liberal candidate Alexander Marshall was elected on 21 November 1914.
^{6} Labor MHA for Bass, Arthur Anderson, died on 5 May 1915. Labor candidate James McDonald was elected on 26 June 1915.
^{7} Liberal MHA for Franklin, Norman Ewing, resigned on 22 September 1915. Liberal candidate Daniel Ryan was elected on 11 October 1915.

== Sources ==
- Hughes, Colin A.; Graham, B. D. (1976). Voting for the South Australian, Western Australian and Tasmanian Lower Houses, 1890-1964. Canberra: Australian National University. ISBN 0-7081-1334-6.
- Parliament of Tasmania (2006). The Parliament of Tasmania from 1856
