= Leader of the Opposition (Tasmania) =

Australian politician

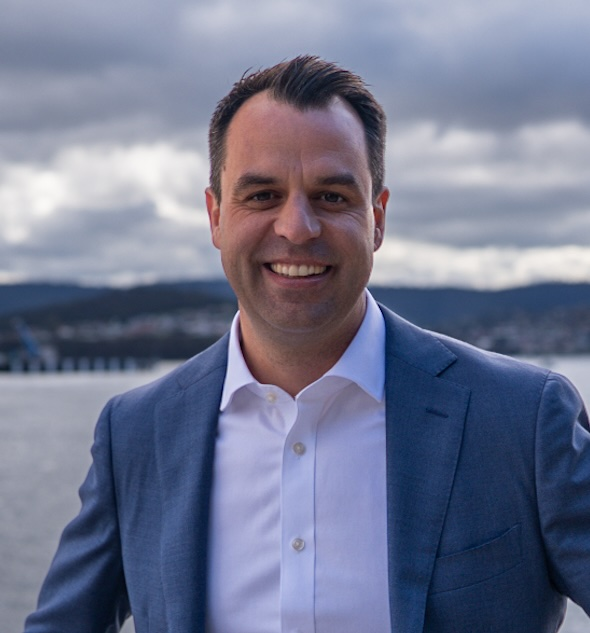
- Incumbent; Josh Willie since 20 August 2025
- Term length: While leader of the largest political party not in government
- Inaugural holder: Thomas Gregson
- Formation: November 1856
- Deputy: Janie Finlay

The leader of the opposition in Tasmania is the title of the leader of the largest minority party in the state lower house, the Tasmanian House of Assembly. They act as the public face of the opposition, leads the opposition on the floor of parliament. They thus act as a chief critic of the government and ultimately attempt to portray the opposition as a feasible alternate government. They are also given certain additional rights under parliamentary standing orders, such as extended time limits for speeches. Should the opposition win an election, the leader of the opposition will usually be nominated to become the premier of Tasmania.

The position of leader of the opposition was essentially informal throughout the nineteenth century, with formal recognition only being granted in the early twentieth century. As there was no party system until 1909, the loose ideological blocs in parliament tended to change regularly, and few people lasted in the position for more than one or two years at a time. The development of a party system gave the role greater significance, and it was subsequently given greater formal recognition, with an additional salary payment being accommodated for in 1927 and formal recognition in the parliamentary standing orders in 1937. Uniquely in Australia, the Leader of the Opposition in the Tasmanian House of Assembly is entitled to the prefix “Honourable” whilst holding that office, as recognition that the person leads the alternative government of the day.

The current leader of the opposition is Josh Willie of the Labor Party. Willie was elected into the role on 20 August 2025 to replace then Labor leader Dean Winter following the party's defeat at the 2025 state election.

== List of leaders of the opposition in Tasmania ==
No.	Name	Portrait	Term of Office		Party	Constituency	Elections	Premier
1	Thomas Gregson		1 November 1856	26 February 1857	Independent	Richmond	1856	William Champ; 1856–1857
2	William Champ		26 February 1857	25 April 1857	Independent	Launceston	–	Thomas Gregson; 1857
(1)	Thomas Gregson		25 April 1857	July 1862	Independent	Richmond	–	William Weston; 1857
(1)	Thomas Gregson		25 April 1857	July 1862	Independent	Richmond	–	Francis Smith; 1857–1860
(1)	Thomas Gregson		25 April 1857	July 1862	Independent	Richmond	–	William Weston; 1860–1861
(1)	Thomas Gregson		25 April 1857	July 1862	Independent	Richmond	1861	Thomas Chapman; 1861–1863
3	Charles Meredith		July 1862	20 January 1863	Independent	Glamorgan	1862	Thomas Chapman; 1861–1863
4	Thomas Chapman		February 1863	June 1864	Independent	Campbell Town	–	James Whyte; 1863–1866
5	William Dobson		June 1864	24 November 1866	Independent	Campbell Town	1866	James Whyte; 1863–1866
(3)	Charles Meredith		24 November 1866	4 November 1872	Independent	Kingborough; West Devon	–	Sir Richard Dry; 1866–1869
(3)	Charles Meredith		24 November 1866	4 November 1872	Independent	Kingborough; West Devon	1871	James Wilson; 1869–1872
6	William Giblin		4 November 1872	4 August 1873	Independent	Central Hobart	1872	Frederick Innes; 1872–1873
7	Frederick Innes		4 August 1873	March 1875	Independent	North Launceston	–	Alfred Kennerley; 1873–1876
8	Thomas Reibey		August 1875	20 July 1876	Independent	Westbury	–	Alfred Kennerley; 1873–1876
(6)	William Giblin		20 July 1876	June 1877	Independent	Central Hobart	–	Thomas Reibey; 1876–1877
9	Philip Fysh		July 1877	9 August 1877	Independent	East Hobart	1877	Thomas Reibey; 1876–1877
(8)	Thomas Reibey		September 1877	20 December 1878	Independent	Westbury	–	Philip Fysh; 1877–1878
(8)	Thomas Reibey		September 1877	20 December 1878	Independent	Westbury	–	William Giblin; 1878
(6)	William Giblin		January 1879	30 October 1879	Independent	Wellington	–	William Crowther; 1878–1879
9	Alfred Dobson		October 1882	July 1885	Independent	Glenorchy	1882	William Giblin; 1879–1884
9	Alfred Dobson		October 1882	July 1885	Independent	Glenorchy	–	Adye Douglas; 1884–1886
(8)	Thomas Reibey		July 1885	August 1886	Independent	Westbury	1886	Adye Douglas; 1884–1886
(8)	Thomas Reibey		July 1885	August 1886	Independent	Westbury	–	James Agnew; 1886–1887
10	Edward Braddon		August 1886	29 March 1887	Independent	West Devon	–	James Agnew; 1886–1887
11	Nicholas Brown		July 1887	July 1889	Independent	Cumberland	–	Philip Fysh; 1887–1892
12	William Burgess		July 1889	August 1891	Independent	West Hobart	1891	Philip Fysh; 1887–1892
13	Henry Dobson		September 1891	17 August 1892	Independent	Brighton	–	Philip Fysh; 1887–1892
14	Stafford Bird		17 August 1892	February 1894	Independent	Franklin	1893	Henry Dobson; 1892–1894
(10)	Sir Edward Braddon		February 1894	14 April 1894	Independent	West Devon	–	Henry Dobson; 1892–1894
15	Elliott Lewis		May 1894	November 1897	Independent	Richmond	1897	Sir Edward Braddon; 1894–1899
16	Andrew Clark		November 1897	May 1898	Independent	Hobart	–	Sir Edward Braddon; 1894–1899
(14)	Stafford Bird		June 1898	12 October 1899	Independent	Franklin	–	Sir Edward Braddon; 1894–1899
(10)	Sir Edward Braddon		12 October 1899	29 March 1901	Free Trade	West Devon	1900	Sir Elliott Lewis; 1899–1903
(8)	Thomas Reibey		May 1901	October 1901	Protectionist	Westbury	–	Sir Elliott Lewis; 1899–1903
17	William Propsting		October 1901	9 April 1903	Protectionist	North Hobart	1903	Sir Elliott Lewis; 1899–1903
18	Robert Patterson		May 1903	March 1904	Anti-Socialist	South Hobart	–	William Propsting; 1903–1904
19	John Evans		March 1904	12 July 1904	Anti-Socialist	Kingborough	–	William Propsting; 1903–1904
(17)	William Propsting		12 July 1904	December 1905	Protectionist	North Hobart	–	John Evans; 1904–1909
20	Herbert Nicholls		January 1906	January 1909	Protectionist	Central Hobart	1906	John Evans; 1904–1909
21	John Earle		April 1909	20 October 1909	Labor	Waratah; Franklin	1909	John Evans; 1904–1909
21	John Earle		April 1909	20 October 1909	Labor	Waratah; Franklin	–	Sir Elliott Lewis; 1909
(15)	Sir Elliott Lewis		20 October 1909	27 October 1909	Liberal League	Denison	–	John Earle; 1909
(21)	John Earle		27 October 1909	6 April 1914	Labor	Franklin	1912	Sir Elliott Lewis; 1909–1912
(21)	John Earle		27 October 1909	6 April 1914	Labor	Franklin	1913	Albert Solomon; 1912–1914
22	Albert Solomon		6 April 1914	5 October 1914	Liberal League	Bass	–	John Earle; 1914–1916
23	Norman Ewing		5 October 1914	23 September 1915	Liberal League	Franklin	–	John Earle; 1914–1916
24	Sir Walter Lee		23 September 1915	15 April 1916	Liberal League	Wilmot	1916	John Earle; 1914–1916
(21)	John Earle		15 April 1916	2 November 1916	Labor	Franklin	–	Sir Walter Lee; 1916–1922
25	Joseph Lyons		2 November 1916	25 October 1923	Labor	Wilmot	1919	Sir Walter Lee; 1916–1922
25	Joseph Lyons		2 November 1916	25 October 1923	Labor	Wilmot	1922	Sir Walter Lee; 1916–1922
25	Joseph Lyons		2 November 1916	25 October 1923	Labor	Wilmot	–	John Hayes; 1922–1923
25	Joseph Lyons		2 November 1916	25 October 1923	Labor	Wilmot	–	Sir Walter Lee; 1923
26	Edward Hobbs		25 October 1923	November 1923	Country	Darwin	–	Joseph Lyons; 1923–1928
27	James Newton		November 1923	October 1924	Nationalist	Bass	–	Joseph Lyons; 1923–1928
(26)	Edward Hobbs		October 1924	29 July 1925	Country	Darwin	1925	Joseph Lyons; 1923–1928
28	John McPhee		29 July 1925	15 June 1928	Nationalist	Denison	1928	Joseph Lyons; 1923–1928
(25)	Joseph Lyons		15 June 1928	13 September 1929	Labor	Wilmot	–	John McPhee; 1928–1934
29	Benjamin Watkins		13 September 1929	15 October 1929	Labor	Franklin	–	John McPhee; 1928–1934
30	Albert Ogilvie		15 October 1929	22 June 1934	Labor	Franklin	1931	John McPhee; 1928–1934
30	Albert Ogilvie		15 October 1929	22 June 1934	Labor	Franklin	1934	Sir Walter Lee; 1934
(24)	Sir Walter Lee		22 July 1934	July 1936	Nationalist	Wilmot	–	Albert Ogilvie; 1934–1939
31	Henry Baker		July 1936	22 February 1945	Nationalist	Franklin	1937	Albert Ogilvie; 1934–1939
31	Henry Baker		July 1936	22 February 1945	Nationalist	Franklin	–	Edmund Dwyer-Gray; 1939
31	Henry Baker		July 1936	22 February 1945	Nationalist	Franklin	1941	Robert Cosgrove; 1939–1947
32	Neil Campbell		22 February 1945	6 February 1950	Liberal	Wilmot	1946	Robert Cosgrove; 1939–1947
32	Neil Campbell		22 February 1945	6 February 1950	Liberal	Wilmot	–	Edward Brooker; 1947–1948
32	Neil Campbell		22 February 1945	6 February 1950	Liberal	Wilmot	1948	Robert Cosgrove; 1948–1958
33	Reginald Townley		6 February 1950	26 June 1956	Liberal	Denison	1950	Robert Cosgrove; 1948–1958
33	Reginald Townley		6 February 1950	26 June 1956	Liberal	Denison	1955	Robert Cosgrove; 1948–1958
34	Tim Jackson		26 June 1956	19 March 1960	Liberal	Franklin	1956	Robert Cosgrove; 1948–1958
34	Tim Jackson		26 June 1956	19 March 1960	Liberal	Franklin	1959	Eric Reece; 1958–1969
35	Angus Bethune		19 March 1960	27 May 1969	Liberal	Wilmot	1964	Eric Reece; 1958–1969
35	Angus Bethune		19 March 1960	27 May 1969	Liberal	Wilmot	1969	Eric Reece; 1958–1969
36	Eric Reece		27 May 1969	4 May 1972	Labor	Braddon	1972	Angus Bethune; 1969–1972
37	Max Bingham		4 May 1972	7 August 1979	Liberal	Denison	–	Eric Reece; 1972–1975
37	Max Bingham		4 May 1972	7 August 1979	Liberal	Denison	1976	Bill Neilson; 1975–1977
37	Max Bingham		4 May 1972	7 August 1979	Liberal	Denison	1979	Doug Lowe; 1977–1981
38	Geoff Pearsall		7 August 1979	10 November 1981	Liberal	Franklin	–	Doug Lowe; 1977–1981
39	Robin Gray		10 November 1981	27 May 1982	Liberal	Wilmot	1982	Harry Holgate; 1981–1982
40	Ken Wriedt		27 May 1982	19 February 1986	Labor	Franklin	1986	Robin Gray; 1982–1989
41	Neil Batt		19 February 1986	14 December 1988	Labor	Denison	–	Robin Gray; 1982–1989
42	Michael Field		14 December 1988	29 June 1989	Labor	Braddon	1989	Robin Gray; 1982–1989
(39)	Robin Gray		29 June 1989	17 December 1991	Liberal	Lyons	–	Michael Field; 1989–1992
43	Ray Groom		17 December 1991	17 February 1992	Liberal	Denison	1992	Michael Field; 1989–1992
(42)	Michael Field		17 February 1992	14 April 1997	Labor	Braddon	1996	Ray Groom; 1992–1996
(42)	Michael Field		17 February 1992	14 April 1997	Labor	Braddon	–	Tony Rundle; 1996–1998
44	Jim Bacon		14 April 1997	14 September 1998	Labor	Denison	1998	Tony Rundle; 1996–1998
45	Tony Rundle		14 September 1998	2 July 1999	Liberal	Braddon	–	Jim Bacon; 1998–2004
46	Sue Napier		2 July 1999	20 August 2001	Liberal	Bass	–	Jim Bacon; 1998–2004
47	Bob Cheek		20 August 2001	6 August 2002	Liberal	Denison	2002	Jim Bacon; 1998–2004
48	Rene Hidding		6 August 2002	30 March 2006	Liberal	Lyons	–	Jim Bacon; 1998–2004
48	Rene Hidding		6 August 2002	30 March 2006	Liberal	Lyons	2006	Paul Lennon; 2004–2008
49	Will Hodgman		30 March 2006	31 March 2014	Liberal	Franklin	–	Paul Lennon; 2004–2008
49	Will Hodgman		30 March 2006	31 March 2014	Liberal	Franklin	2010	David Bartlett; 2008–2011
49	Will Hodgman		30 March 2006	31 March 2014	Liberal	Franklin	2014	Lara Giddings; 2011–2014
50	Bryan Green		31 March 2014	17 March 2017	Labor	Braddon	–	Will Hodgman; 2014–2020
51	Rebecca White		17 March 2017	17 May 2021	Labor	Lyons	2018	Will Hodgman; 2014–2020
51	Rebecca White		17 March 2017	17 May 2021	Labor	Lyons	2021	Peter Gutwein; 2020–2022
52	David O'Byrne		15 June 2021	7 July 2021	Labor	Franklin	–	Peter Gutwein; 2020–2022
(51)	Rebecca White		7 July 2021	10 April 2024	Labor	Lyons	–	Peter Gutwein; 2020–2022
(51)	Rebecca White		7 July 2021	10 April 2024	Labor	Lyons	2024	Jeremy Rockliff; 2022–
53	Dean Winter		10 April 2024	20 August 2025	Labor	Franklin	2025	Jeremy Rockliff; 2022–
54	Josh Willie		20 August 2025	Incumbent	Labor	Clark	–	Jeremy Rockliff; 2022–
