= Norman Ewing =

Australian politician (1870–1928)

The Honourable Norman Ewing
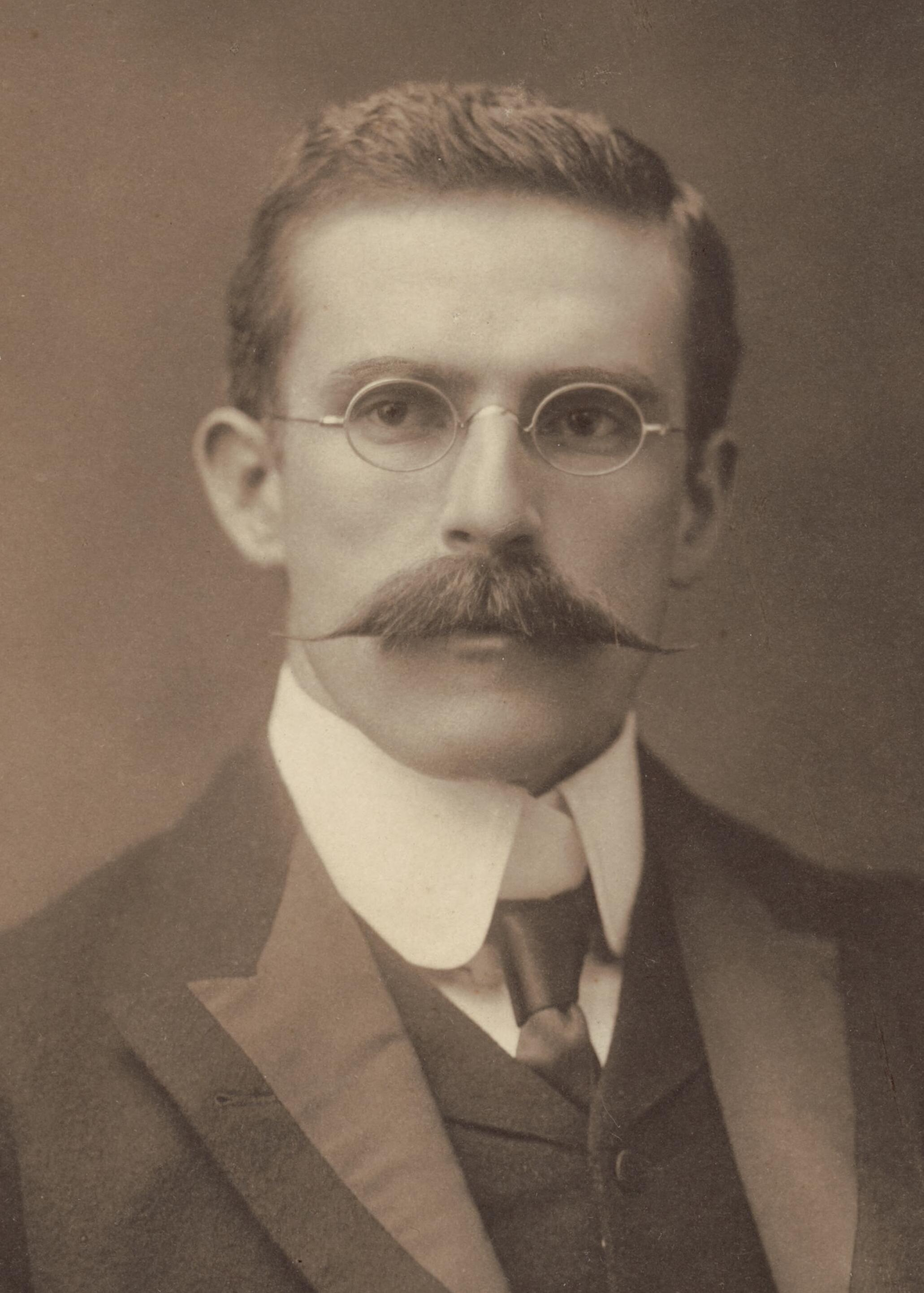

Judge of the Supreme Court of Tasmania
- In office 23 September 1915 – 19 July 1928

Member of the Tasmanian House of Assembly
- In office 30 April 1909 – 22 September 1915
- Constituency: Franklin

Senator for Western Australia
- In office 29 March 1901 – 17 April 1903
- Succeeded by: Henry Saunders

Member of the Western Australian Legislative Assembly
- In office 4 May 1897 – March 1901
- Preceded by: William Loton
- Succeeded by: Mathieson Jacoby
- Constituency: Swan

Personal details
- Born: 26 December 1870 Wollongong, New South Wales, Australia
- Died: 19 July 1928 (aged 57) Launceston, Tasmania, Australia
- Party: Free Trade
- Spouse: Maude Stone (m. 1897)
- Relations: John Ewing (brother); Thomas Ewing (brother); John Thomson (uncle); Edward Stone (father-in-law)
- Occupation: Solicitor

Norman Kirkwood Ewing (26 December 1870 – 19 July 1928) was an Australian lawyer, politician and judge. He was born in New South Wales and moved to Western Australia in the 1890s. He served in the Western Australian Legislative Assembly from 1897 to 1901 and was elected to the Senate at the inaugural federal election in 1901. He resigned from the Senate in 1903 and in 1905 moved to Tasmania, where he served in the Tasmanian House of Assembly from 1909 to 1915. His last public role was as a judge on the Supreme Court of Tasmania from 1915 until his death in 1928.

== Early life ==
Ewing was born on 26 December 1870 in Wollongong, New South Wales. The son of Anglican clergyman Thomas Campbell Ewing and Elizabeth née Thomson, one of his uncles was John Thomson, who himself became a Member of the New South Wales Legislative Assembly. His brothers were John Ewing and Sir Thomas Ewing, who were also members of parliament (though in different jurisdictions).

Ewing was educated at Illawarra College in Wollongong, then Oakwoods at Mittagong, and finally night school in Sydney. Articled to M. A. H. Fitzhardinge, he became a solicitor in 1894, practising initially at Murwillumbah.

== Politics ==
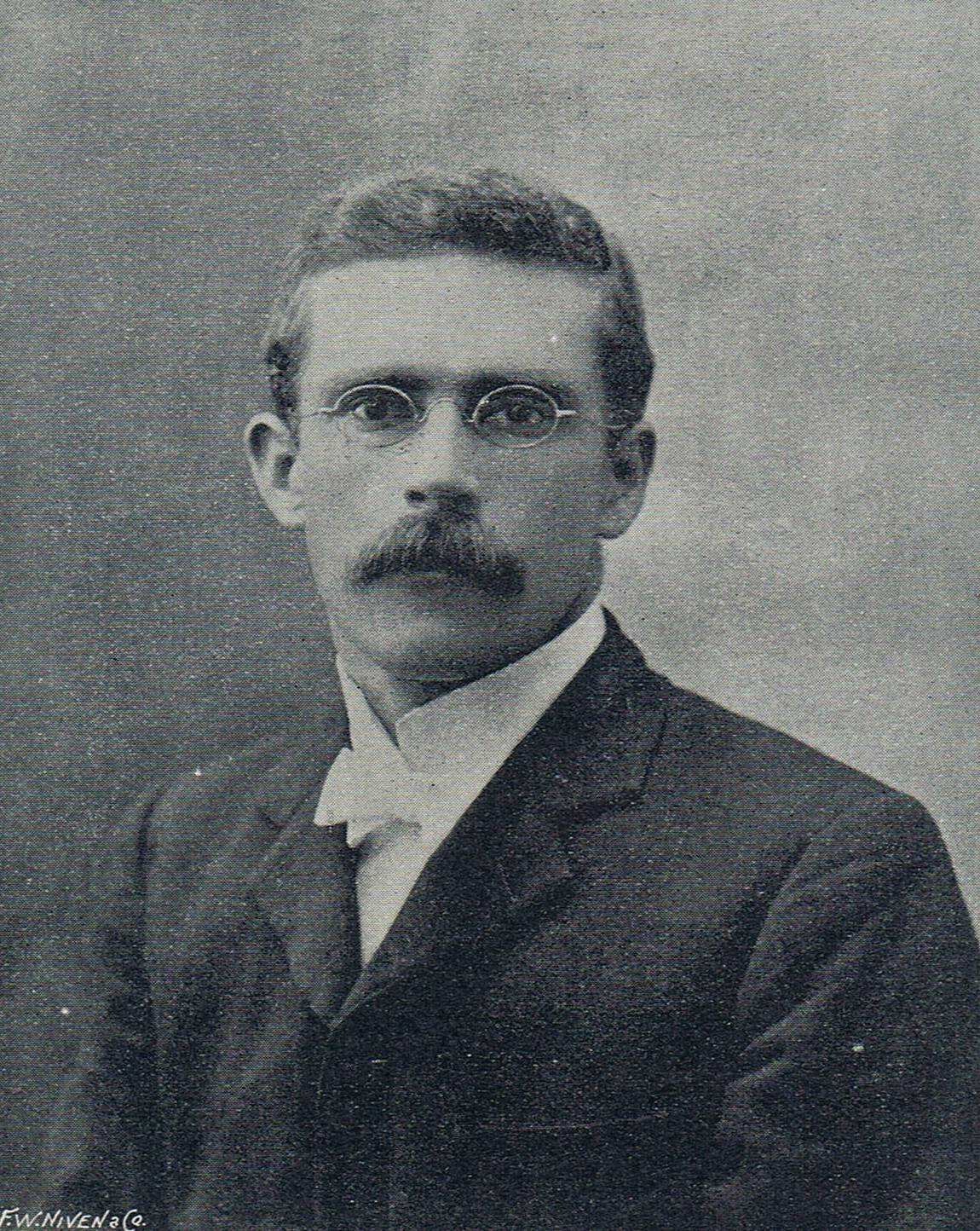
Ewing in 1897

In 1895, Ewing contested the New South Wales Legislative Assembly seat of Tweed as an independent Protectionist, but was unsuccessful. He moved to Perth, Western Australia, later that year. He was admitted to the bar the following year, and in 1897 established the firm of Ewing and Downing. That year he published The Practice of the Local Courts of Western Australia.

On 4 May 1897, Ewing was elected to the Western Australian Legislative Assembly seat of Swan as an independent. He held the seat of Swan until March 1901, when he resigned it to take up a short-term seat in the first Australian Senate, which he had won on a Free Trade ticket. His term was due to continue until 31 December 1903. In 1902, while still a Senator, Ewing stood unsuccessfully for the position of Mayor of Perth. He resigned as Senator eight months early on 17 April 1903, becoming the first member of either house of the Australian Parliament to resign his seat. In June 1904 he was an independent candidate for the Western Australian Legislative Assembly seat of Canning, but was unsuccessful.

Ewing moved to Tasmania in 1905, where he established the firm of Ewing and Seager in Hobart. He was an unsuccessful Tasmanian candidate for the Senate at the 1906 federal election, losing by a small margin. In 1907, Ewing was involved in the creation of the Progressive League, which aimed to replace the stagnant National Association as the primary anti-socialist organisation in Tasmania. He was a prominent critic of state premier John Evans, although both he and Evans received the endorsement of the Progressive League.

At the 1909 state election, Ewing was elected to represent the district of Franklin in the Tasmanian House of Assembly. He held the seat for over six years, for the last year of which he was Leader of the Opposition. After the 1909 election he forced the defeat of Evans' successor Elliott Lewis on a no-confidence motion, although Lewis quickly returned as premier after Labor leader John Earle made an attempt to govern in minority. He was later associated with the Liberal League.

== Supreme Court of Tasmania ==
Ewing was made a King's Counsel in 1914, and in September the following year resigned his seat in parliament to accept an appointment as a Judge of the Supreme Court of Tasmania. As Judge of the Supreme Court, he was involved in the 1915 Tasmanian Royal Commission into the public debt sinking fund; charges brought against Victor Ratten in 1918. He was appointed a Deputy Judge of the Supreme Court of the Northern Territory and chair of the 1919–20 Royal Commission into the administration of the Northern Territory, known as the Darwin Rebellion. He also conducted the 1920 Royal Commission in New South Wales into the government's imprisonment of twelve Industrial Workers of the World members.

From November 1923 to June 1924, Ewing was appointed Administrator of Tasmania, while awaiting the arrival of the new governor Captain Sir James O'Grady. In 1924 he had a stroke, and thereafter worked only intermittently. He died at Launceston on 19 July 1928, and was buried at Carr Villa cemetery.

== Personal life ==
In 1897, Ewing married Maude Stone, the daughter of Western Australian judge Edward Albert Stone. The couple had a son and a daughter together and adopted another daughter. Their first daughter Ethel was killed in a horse riding accident in 1925.

Western Australian Legislative Assembly
Preceded by William Loton	Member for Swan; 1897–1901	Succeeded by Mathieson Jacoby
Tasmanian House of Assembly
New division	Member for Franklin; 1909–1915; With: David Dicker; Thomas Hodgman / George Martin; John Earle; Alexander Hean / Arthur Cotton; John Evans	Succeeded by Daniel Ryan
Political offices
Preceded by Albert Solomon	Leader of the Opposition (Tasmania); 1914−1915	Succeeded by Sir Walter Lee
Legal offices
Preceded by Edward Dobbie	Judge of the Supreme Court of Tasmania; 1915−1928	Succeeded by Andrew Inglis Clark, Jr.
