= Electoral district of Waratah =

Electoral district of Waratah may refer to:

- Electoral district of Waratah (New South Wales), a former electorate of the New South Wales Legislative Assembly
- Electoral district of Waratah (Tasmania), a former electorate of the Tasmanian House of Assembly
