= Tasmanian House of Assembly electoral divisions =

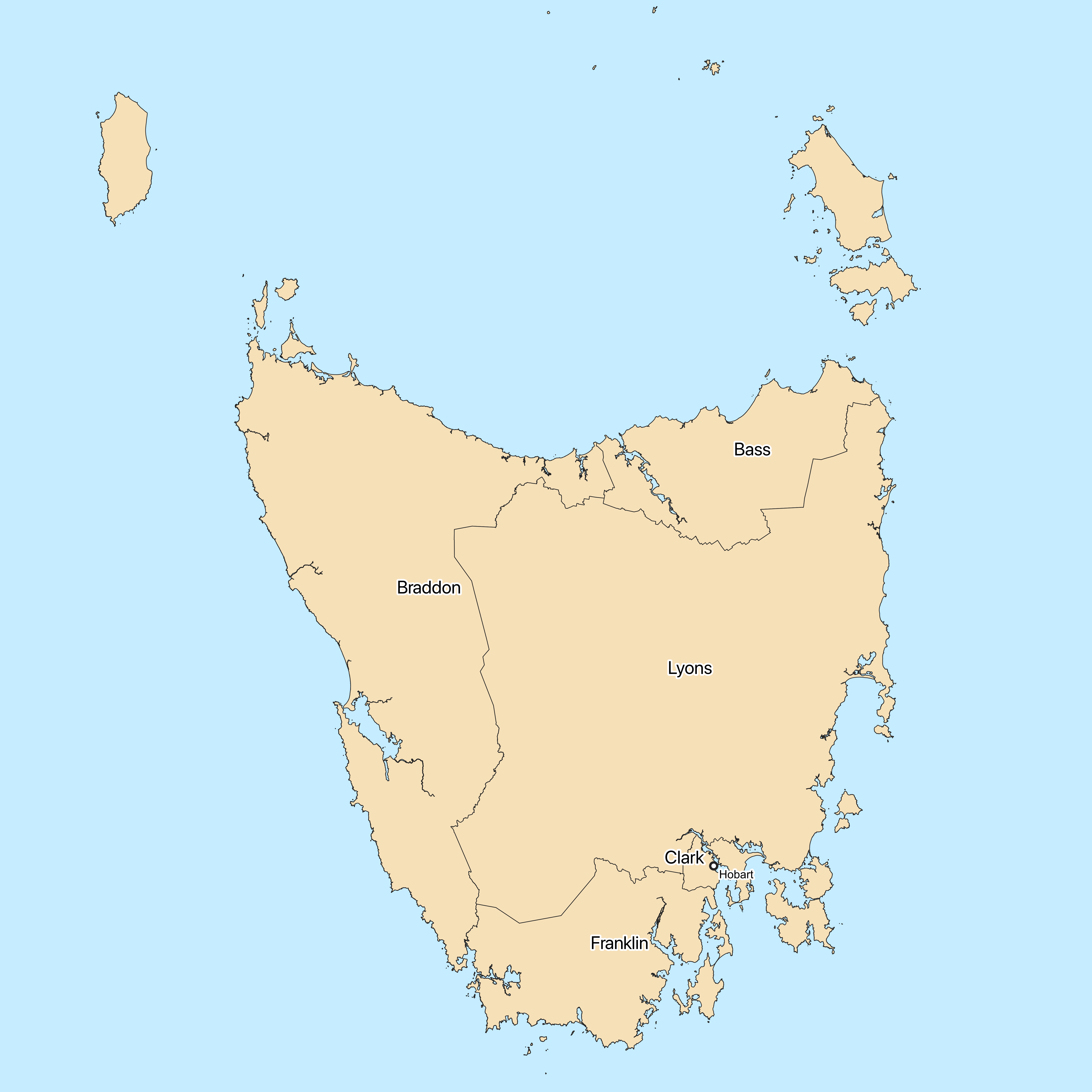
Map of Tasmania showing the five House of Assembly divisions

The Tasmanian House of Assembly has five divisions, with five members each. The boundaries are the same as those used for the federal House of Representatives.

== Current divisions ==
The five Tasmanian House of Assembly divisions as of the 2018 redistribution are:

Bass	Map of the Tasmanian House of Assembly divisions, Bass highlighted in green.
Braddon	Map of the Tasmanian House of Assembly divisions, Braddon highlighted in green.
Clark	Map of the Tasmanian House of Assembly divisions, Clark highlighted in green.

Franklin	Map of the Tasmanian House of Assembly divisions, Franklin highlighted in green.
Lyons	Map of the Tasmanian House of Assembly divisions, Lyons highlighted in green.

== Abolished Divisions ==
- Division of Darwin (1903–1955)
- Division of Denison (1909–2018)
- Division of Wilmot (1903–1984)

== See also ==
- Tasmanian Legislative Council electoral divisions
