= Electoral district of Waratah (Tasmania) =

Former Tasmanian House of Assembly electoral district

The Electoral district of Waratah was a single-member electoral district of the Tasmanian House of Assembly. It centred on the town of Waratah in western Tasmania.

The seat was created in a redistribution ahead of the 1897 election from the southern part of the Wellington electorate, which had been a two-member seat until the election. The seat was abolished when the Tasmanian parliament adopted the Hare-Clark electoral model in 1909. Its final member, John Earle, successfully stood for the multi-member seat of Franklin and, shortly after the 1909 election, became Tasmania's first Labor premier, albeit of an unstable minority government which lasted a week. He regained the Premiership in 1914 and held it for two years, before gaining a seat in the Australian Senate.

== Members for Waratah ==
Member	Party	Term
Charles Hall		1897–1903
George Gilmore		1903–1906
John Earle	Labour	1906–1909
