= 1916 Tasmanian state election =

State election in Australia

- 25 March 1916

All 30 seats to the House of Assembly
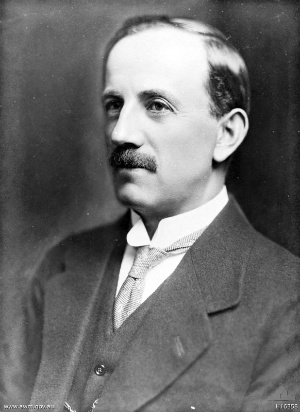

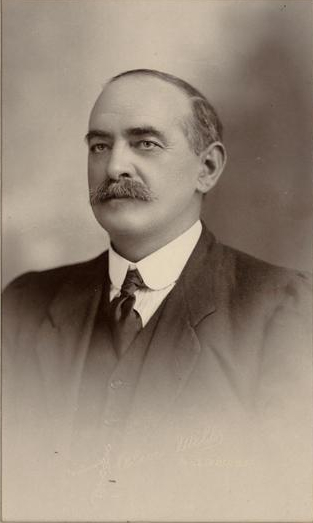
	First party	Second party
Leader	Walter Lee	John Earle
Party	Liberal	Labor
Leader since	September 1915	1906
Leader's seat	Wilmot	Franklin
Last election	16 seats	14 seats
Seats won	15 seats	14 seats
Seat change	▼1	0
Percentage	48.23%	48.47%
Swing	▼4.35	▲2.47
- Results of the election
Premier before election
John Earle
Labor
Resulting Premier
Walter Lee
Liberal

The 1916 Tasmanian state election was held on Saturday, 25 March 1916 in the Australian state of Tasmania to elect 30 members of the Tasmanian House of Assembly. The election used the Hare-Clark proportional representation system — six members were elected from each of five electorates.

Although the Liberals had won the 1913 election, a subsequent by-election had seen both parties holding 15 seats in the House of Assembly and Solomon losing government to Labor's John Earle. Earle's government had been appointed on the expectation that Earle would quickly call for a dissolution of the House of Assembly, which he refused to do, and successfully appealed to the Colonial Office.

At the election, Earle was the incumbent Premier of Tasmania and the Liberal Party was headed by Walter Lee. The Labor Party made no gains at the 1916 election. Joshua Whitsitt won as an independent. The Liberals had no clear majority, winning 15 seats. Lee became Premier, as leader of the party with the most seats.

== Results ==
Party	Votes	%	+/–	Seats	+/–
Liberal	35,939	48.23	-4.35	15	▲1
Labor	36,118	48.47	+2.47	14	▼1
Independents	2,457	3.30	+1.88	1	Steady
Total	74,514	100.00	–	30	–
Valid votes	74,514	94.34			
Invalid/blank votes	4,470	5.66	+2.79		
Total votes	78,984	100.00	–		
Registered voters/turnout	107,321	73.60	+6.35		

Popular vote
Labor	48.47%
Liberal	48.23%
Independents	3.30%

Seats
Liberal	50.00%
Labor	46.67%
Independents	3.33%

== Distribution of votes ==
=== Primary vote by division ===
	Bass	Darwin	Denison	Franklin	Wilmot
Labor Party	53.2%	50.7%	49.6%	48.2%	39.1%
Commonwealth Liberal	45.3%	38.7%	50.4%	51.8%	54.7%
Other	1.5%	10.6%	–	–	6.2%

=== Distribution of seats ===
Electorate	Seats won
Bass	
Darwin	
Denison	
Franklin	
Wilmot	

Labor
Liberal
Independent

== See also ==
- Members of the Tasmanian House of Assembly, 1916–1919
- Candidates of the 1916 Tasmanian state election
