= Daniel Ryan (Tasmanian politician) =

Australian politician

Daniel Edward Ryan (9 September 1870 – 31 March 1953) was an Australian politician.

He was born in Franklin. In 1915 he was elected to the Tasmanian House of Assembly as a Liberal member for Franklin in a by-election following Norman Ewing's resignation. He did not contest the next election held in 1916. Ryan died in Hobart in 1953.
