= John Hayes (Tasmanian politician) =

Australian politician

The Honourable John Hayes CMG
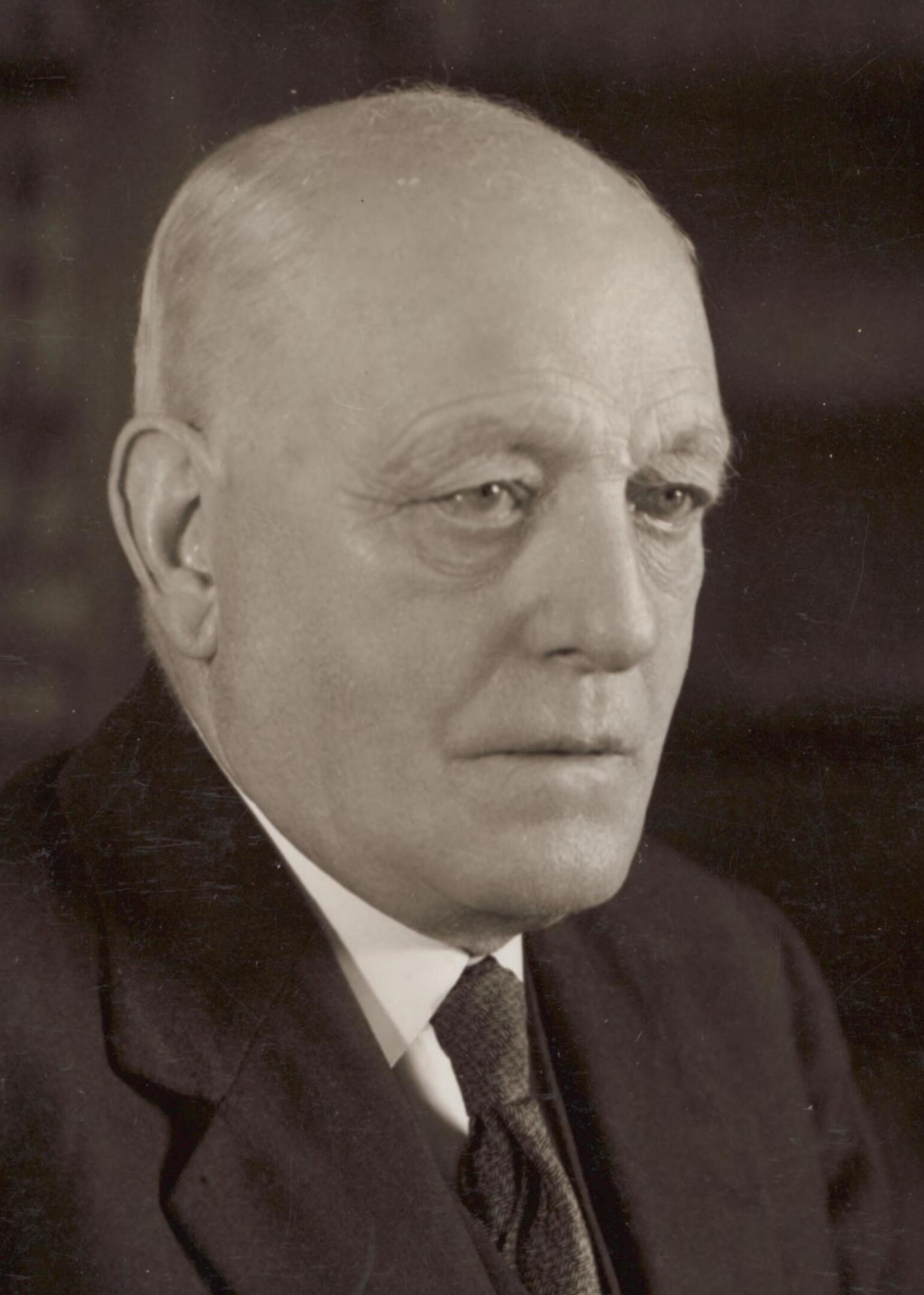

President of the Senate
- In office 1 July 1938 – 30 June 1941
- Preceded by: Patrick Lynch
- Succeeded by: James Cunningham

Senator for Tasmania
- In office 12 September 1923 – 30 June 1947
- Preceded by: Thomas Bakhap

Premier of Tasmania
- In office 12 August 1922 – 14 August 1923
- Preceded by: Walter Lee
- Succeeded by: Walter Lee

Member of the Tasmanian House of Assembly
- In office 23 January 1913 – 12 September 1923
- Constituency: Bass

Personal details
- Born: John Blyth Hayes; 21 April 1868 Bridgewater, Tasmania, Australia
- Died: 12 July 1956 (aged 88) Launceston, Tasmania, Australia
- Party: Liberal (to 1916); Nationalist (1916–31); UAP (1931–45); Liberal (from 1945)
- Spouse: Laura Blyth (m. 1907)
- Relations: Ernest Blyth (brother-in-law)
- Occupation: Farmer

John Blyth Hayes CMG (21 April 1868 – 12 July 1956) was an Australian politician who served as a Senator for Tasmania from 1923 to 1947. He was President of the Senate from 1938 to 1941. Before entering federal politics, he had been a member of the Parliament of Tasmania from 1913 to 1923 and served as Premier of Tasmania for almost exactly one year, from 1922 to 1923.

== Early life ==
Hayes was born on 21 April 1868 in Bridgewater, Tasmania. He was the son of Elizabeth (née Blyth) and Joshua John Hayes, his father being a farmer. His grandfather John Hayes was a Tasmanian member of parliament in the 1860s.

Hayes was educated by his mother, but little else is known of his early life. He participated in the Western Australian gold rushes, and eventually became the manager of an ore-reduction facility and cyanide works at Wiluna. In about 1906 he returned to Tasmania and took up a property at Scottsdale. He married his cousin Laura Linda Blyth on 22 January 1907. Her brother Ernest Blyth was also a member of parliament.

== State politics ==
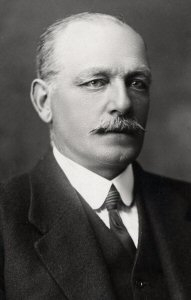
Hayes c. 1913

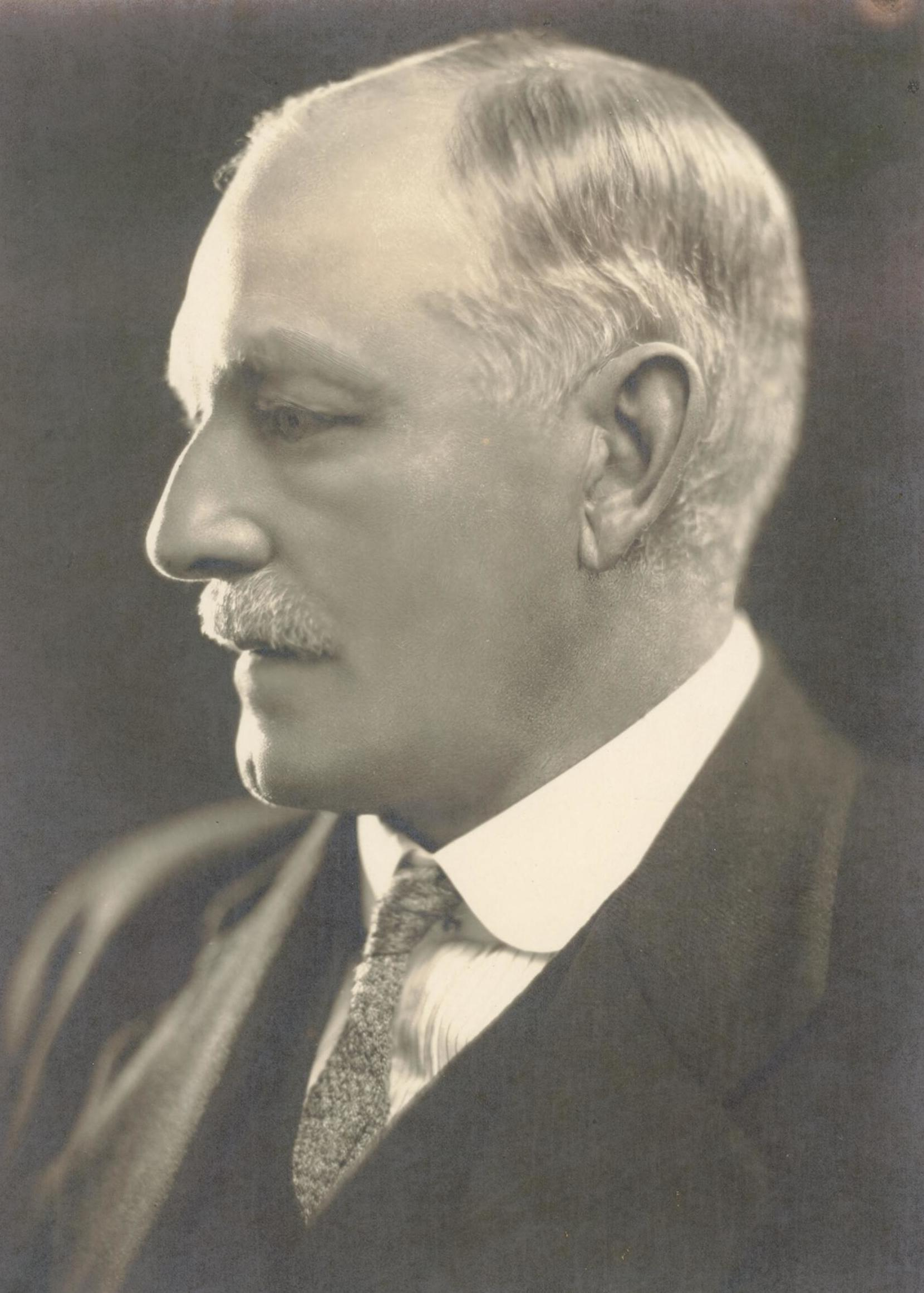
Hayes c. 1925, photograph by Jack Cato

Hayes was elected president of the North-Eastern Agricultural and Pastoral Association in 1911 and secretary of the Scottsdale Board of Agriculture in 1912. He was elected to the Tasmanian House of Assembly at the 1913 state election, running as a Liberal in Bass with the support of the farming community. In September 1915, Hayes was elected deputy leader of the opposition under Walter Lee. The Liberals formed a government after the 1916 state election, and subsequently adopted the name of the federal Nationalist Party formed after the Australian Labor Party split of 1916.

With Lee as premier, Hayes served as Minister for Lands and Works (1916–1919), Minister for Works (1919–1923), and Minister for Agriculture (1916–1923). He was also in charge of the Hydro-Electric Department. He won praise for his handling of the agriculture portfolio and for his work in the area of soldier settlement. In 1921, he was appointed Companion of the Order of St Michael and St George (CMG).

The Nationalists were reduced to a minority government at the 1922 state election, due to the success of the newly formed Country Party led by Hayes' brother-in-law Ernest Blyth. Lee did not enjoy the support of the Country Party and resigned as premier in August 1922. With the support of Blyth, Hayes replaced him as state premier on 14 August and formed a coalition, the first in the state's history. He inherited a government heavily in debt, but was unable to resolve the situation and was criticised for inaction. He resigned as premier on 16 August 1923, after just after a year in office.

== Federal politics ==
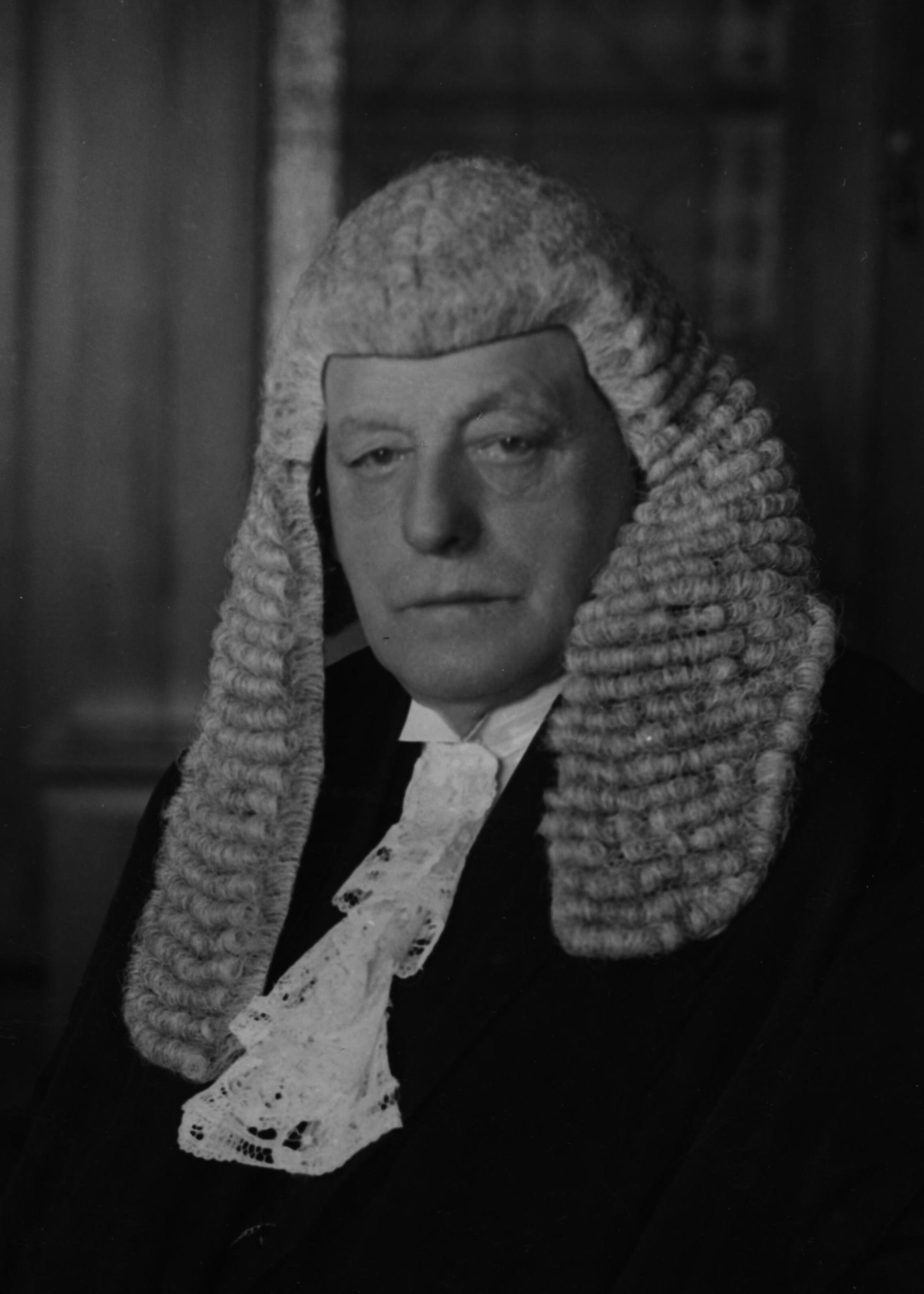
Hayes as President of the Senate

After losing the premiership, Hayes nominated to fill the casual vacancy caused by the death of Senator Thomas Bakhap. He was elected only narrowly, beginning his term on 12 September 1923. He won election in his own right at the 1925 federal election, and then was elected to full six-year terms in 1928, 1934, and 1940. He joined the United Australia Party (UAP) with the rest of the Nationalists upon its formation in 1931.

In the Senate, Hayes concentrated on rural issues and Tasmanian matters. He served on the Joint Committee of Public Accounts from 1926 to 1932, including for a period as chairman. He was elected President of the Senate on 1 July 1938, becoming the first Tasmanian to hold the position. His election meant that the positions of President of the Senate, Speaker of the House of Representatives, and Prime Minister were all held by Tasmanians (George John Bell being the incumbent speaker and Joseph Lyons the incumbent prime minister).

Hayes faced several motions of dissent in the early days of his presidency, but his rulings later achieved widespread acceptance. He lost his position in unusual circumstances on 1 July 1941, when the Senate elected at the 1940 election convened for the first time. Although the government had a nominal majority in the Senate, Allan MacDonald had been taken ill and Keith Wilson was absent overseas on military duty. This allowed the ALP candidate James Cunningham to tie with Hayes. Cunningham's name was subsequently drawn at random in accordance with the standing rules of the Senate.

== Final years ==
Hayes did not recontest his seat at the 1946 election and he was 79 years old at the expiration of his term on 30 June 1947. He retired to Launceston where he died on 12 July 1956. He was granted a state funeral and buried at Carr Villa Cemetery.

Political offices
Preceded by Sir Walter Lee	Premier of Tasmania; 1922–1923	Succeeded by Sir Walter Lee
Preceded by Patrick Lynch	President of the Australian Senate; 1938–1941	Succeeded by James Cunningham
