= 1913 Tasmanian state election =

State election in Australia

- 23 January 1913

All 30 seats to the House of Assembly
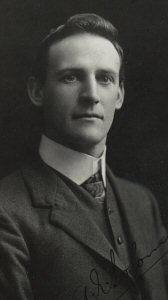

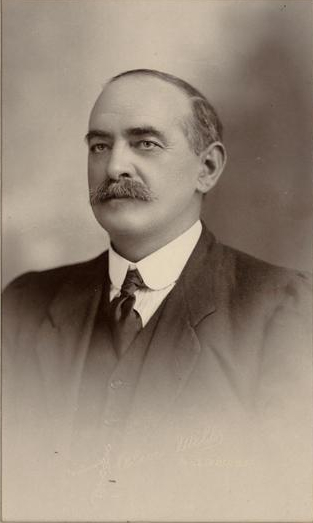
| | First party | Second party |
|---|---|---|
| Leader | Albert Solomon | John Earle |
| Party | Liberal | Labor |
| Leader since | 14 June 1912 | 1906 |
| Leader's seat | Bass | Franklin |
| Last election | 16 seats | 14 seats |
| Seats won | 16 seats | 14 seats |
| Seat change | 0 | 0 |
| Percentage | 52.58% | 46.00% |
| Swing | ▼1.90 | ▲0.48 |
- Results of the election
Premier before election
Albert Solomon
Liberal
Elected Premier
Albert Solomon
Liberal

The 1913 Tasmanian state election was held on Thursday, 23 January 1913 in the Australian state of Tasmania to elect 30 members of the Tasmanian House of Assembly. The election used the Hare-Clark proportional representation system — six members were elected from each of five electorates.

The 1913 election was called less than a year after the 1912 election. Following the 1912 election, the Liberal League held only a small majority in the House of Assembly, and Premier Albert Solomon was dependent on the support of Norman Cameron. In addition, Solomon was under threat from the same CLP unrest that had unseated his predecessor, Elliott Lewis. Labor sought to capitalise on Solomon's tenuous grasp on government, and moved a series of no-confidence motions against him, including a censure motion over the Mount Lyell disaster.

In an attempt to secure his position, Solomon requested and received from the Governor of Tasmania an early dissolution of the House of Assembly, and an early election. The result was the same as had been in the outgoing House of Assembly, except that Cameron lost his seat to another Liberal.

Solomon's advantage, however, was short-lived. The Liberals lost a seat in a by-election, and Joshua Whitsitt's behaviour was becoming erratic. Solomon lost a no-confidence motion in April 1914, and the Governor denied his request for another dissolution, calling upon John Earle to form a Labor government.

== Results ==
| Party | Votes | % | +/– | Seats | +/– |
|---|---|---|---|---|---|
| Liberal | 36,157 | 52.58 | -1.90 | 16 | ▲1 |
| Labor | 31,633 | 46.00 | +0.48 | 14 | Steady |
| Independents | 977 | 1.42 | +1.42 | 0 | ▼1 |
| Total | 68,767 | 100.00 | – | 30 | – |
| Valid votes | 68,767 | 97.13 | | | |
| Invalid/blank votes | 2,035 | 2.87 | +0.02 | | |
| Total votes | 70,802 | 100.00 | – | | |
| Registered voters/turnout | 105,292 | 67.24 | -6.23 | | |

Popular vote
| Liberal | 52.58% |
| Labor | 46.00% |
| Independents | 1.42% |

Seats
| Liberal | 53.33% |
| Labor | 46.67% |

== Distribution of votes ==
=== Primary vote by division ===
| | Bass | Darwin | Denison | Franklin | Wilmot |
|---|---|---|---|---|---|
| Labor Party | 50.3% | 51.1% | 48.0% | 43.8% | 36.2% |
| Commonwealth Liberal | 49.7% | 48.9% | 52.0% | 56.2% | 55.8% |
| Other | – | – | – | – | 8.0% |

=== Distribution of seats ===
| Electorate | Seats won |
|---|---|
| Bass | |
| Darwin | |
| Denison | |
| Franklin | |
| Wilmot | |

| Labor |
| Liberal |

== See also ==
- Members of the Tasmanian House of Assembly, 1913–1916
- Candidates of the 1913 Tasmanian state election
