= Tasmanian Liberal League =

Tasmanian political party

- Leader: Elliott Lewis (1909–1912); Albert Solomon (1912–1914); Norman Ewing (1914–1915); Walter Lee (1915–1917)
- Founded: 1909
- Dissolved: 1917
- Preceded by: Southern Tasmanian Progressive League
- Succeeded by: Nationalist Party
- Ideology: Liberalism; Anti-socialism

The Tasmanian Liberal League was a political party in the Australian state of Tasmania. It was founded in 1909 and merged into the Nationalist Party in 1917. During its existence it formed a two-party system in the Parliament of Tasmania with the Australian Labor Party (ALP). Although the league was created in the same year as the federal Liberal Party, there were no formal ties between the two.

== Background ==
Tasmania was the last Australian state to develop formal political parties, both in terms of parliamentary parties and extra-parliamentary organisations. The first statewide political party was the Reform League, founded in 1902. It was soon followed by the Workers' Political League, the forerunner of the current Labor Party. The Reform League was succeeded by the National Association in 1904, which in turn became the Southern Tasmanian Progressive League in 1907. With the exception of the Labor Party, which grew rapidly, the parties were mostly inactive outside of election years. There was little cooperation or central control even during election campaigns, and there was no preselection, only endorsement of existing candidates. Within parliament, there was virtually no party discipline outside of the Labor Party, and the main factions continued to be those supporting the government (known as "ministerialists") and those opposed (the Opposition).

== Formation ==
In March 1908, a Farmers' and Stockowners' Association (FSA) was founded with three members of the Legislative Council on its executive committee. In a letter to The Mercury in May 1909, its president Andrew Mansell argued that the National Association and Progressive League had failed due to their lack of support in country areas, and called for the formation of a new anti-Labor organisation. The FSA received support from the local branch of the Australian Women's National League, as well as what remained of the Progressive League. A public meeting chaired by William Burgess was held in Launceston on 20 July 1909, where it was resolved to form a statewide anti-socialist organisation. The meeting adopted the name "Tasmanian Liberal League", and subsequently put forward a seven-point platform and a draft constitution. A second meeting was held in Hobart on 4 August, which elected a provisional state council that included three members of the House of Assembly.

== Organisational aspects ==
The new organisation received a boost when Premier Elliott Lewis accepted its presidency, effectively tying together the extra-parliamentary organisation with the anti-Labor parliamentary party. The Liberal League formally absorbed the Progressive League in September 1909. It appointed three professional organisers to tour the state, and by June 1910 was claiming the establishment of 103 branches. The first state conference in June 1911 was attended by delegates from 42 branches, while a second conference in May 1912 was attended by 119 delegates from 86 of the party's 132 branches. Each branch elected delegates to a divisional council, one for each of the five electorates in Tasmania. Each of the divisional councils then nominated four members of the state council, which functioned as the party's executive. Prospective candidates were required to adhere only to the general principles of the party, rather than the entire platform. The party's constitution forbade branches, divisional councils, and state council from putting forward an order of preferences for endorsed candidates. (Under the Hare–Clark system, there were multiple vacancies in each seat, requiring parties to endorse multiple candidates).

== Political and electoral aspects ==
The party faced its first electoral challenges in 1911, winning two by-elections and helping defeat the federal Labor government's proposed constitutional amendments. At the 1912 state election, the Liberals endorsed 35 candidates across the five electorates, winning 15 out of 30 seats. The party was able to remain in government with the vote of an independent, Norman Cameron. However, Lewis was deposed as leader by Albert Solomon, following a challenge initiated by Norman Ewing. Cameron's support proved to be fickle, forcing the Liberals to adopt an unprecedented level of party discipline; the only major split was on the temperance issue. Due to the parliament's instability, Solomon called an early election for January 1913. The Liberals won back Cameron's seat, finishing with 16 seats out of 30. However, Joshua Whitsitt soon defected from the party and supported a no-confidence motion. Labor under John Earle then formed a minority government.

Ewing succeeded Solomon as leader of the Liberal League in October 1914, but was replaced by Walter Lee in September 1915. Lee was able to form a government after the 1916 state election. At federal level, there was no formal connection between the Liberal League and the Liberal Party established by Alfred Deakin in 1909, but "in practice the federal leaders and their subalterns maintained a variety of personal links with one another". The state party did endorse candidates for federal elections, whose members joined the federal parliamentary Liberals if elected. In 1917, the party was merged into the National Federation, the new organisation formed by Prime Minister Billy Hughes from a merger of his National Labor Party with the federal parliamentary Liberal Party. The Liberal League has been cited as a predecessor of the modern Tasmanian Liberals. It was the first enduring anti-Labor party in Tasmania.

=== Election results ===
Note: the changes in seats and votes in 1912 are in comparison with the government vote at the 1909 election.

Year	Seats won	±	Total votes	%	±%	Position	Leader
1912	15 / 30	▼3	40,252	54.48%	▲3.87%	Minority government	Elliott Lewis
1913	16 / 30	▲1	36,157	52.58%	▼1.90%	Majority government	Albert Solomon
1916	15 / 30	▼1	35,939	48.23%	▼4.35%	Minority government	Walter Lee
