= William Fullerton (politician) =

Australian politician and lawyer

William James Fullerton (20 June 1888 – ?) was an Australian politician. He was a lawyer before entering politics. In 1913 Fullerton was elected to the Tasmanian House of Assembly as a Liberal member for Denison, holding his seat until his retirement in 1919. Fullerton died in England. He was a step-son of William McWilliams, who married his widowed mother in 1893.
