= Vincent Barker =

Australian politician

Vincent William Oswald Barker (31 July 1876 – 2 December 1937) was an Australian politician.

He was born in Rosegarland in Tasmania. In 1912 he was elected to the Tasmanian House of Assembly as a Labor member for Denison, serving until his retirement in 1916. Barker died in Hobart in 1937.
