= 1909 Tasmanian state election =

State election in Australia

- 30 April 1909

All 30 seats to the House of Assembly
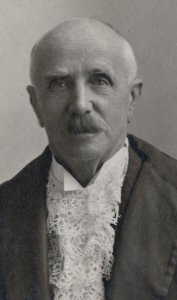

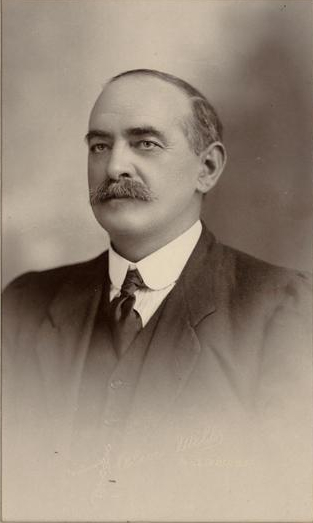

| | First party | Second party | Third party |
|---|---|---|---|
| Leader | John Evans | John Earle |
| Party | Anti-Socialist | Labor | Liberal Democrat |
| Leader since | 12 July 1904 | 1906 |
| Leader's seat | Franklin | Franklin |
| Last election | 22 seats | 7 seats | 6 seats |
| Seats won | 17 seats | 12 seats | 1 seat |
| Seat change | ▼5 | ▲5 | ▼5 |
| Percentage | 50.61% | 38.94% | 9.70% |
| Swing | ▲8.81 | ▲18.82 | ▼4.38 |
- Results of the election
Premier before election
John Evans
Anti-Socialist
Resulting Premier
John Evans
Anti-Socialist

The 1909 Tasmanian state election was held on Friday, 30 April 1909 in the Australian state of Tasmania to elect 30 members of the Tasmanian House of Assembly. This was the first general election in the British Empire to elect all members through a form of proportional representation, the single transferable vote.

At the 1909 election there was a reduction in the number of members from 35 to 30 and the first statewide use of the Hare-Clark electoral system.

Six members were elected from each of five electorates.

The election saw an increase in Labour seats from 7 to 12, at the expense of the Anti-Socialist Party.

== The Hare-Clark system ==
The Tasmanian House of Assembly formed in 1856, at first used a plurality voting system, either first-past-the-post voting or plurality block voting, to elect members from one and two-seat electorates. In 1896, the Tasmanian attorney-general, Andrew Inglis Clark, suggested the House adopt a single transferable vote system devised by Englishman Thomas Hare with certain variations devised by himself, which became known as the Hare-Clark system. The system was used on a trial basis in the Hobart and Launceston electorates in 1897 and 1900, but was never used in the country electorates and was repealed in 1901, with the multi-member districts in the cities being broken up at the 1903 election. In order to blunt the emergence of the Labour Party which won eight seats in the 1906 election, Clark convinced the House to apply the Hare-Clark system statewide.

The outgoing House at the election was represented by 35 single-member districts. The adoption of the Hare-Clark system saw the number of seats in the House reduced from 35 to 30, and six members for each of five electorates (corresponding to the federal electoral divisions of Bass, Darwin, Denison, Franklin and Wilmot) were elected using single transferable voting, a form of proportional representation.

== Key dates ==
| Date | Event |
|---|---|
| 20 March 1909 | New electoral rolls came into force. |
| 22 March 1909 | The Parliament was dissolved. |
| 30 April 1909 | Polling day, between the hours of 8am and 6pm. |
| 19 June 1909 | The Lewis Ministry was reconstituted. |
| 29 June 1909 | Parliament was summoned for business. |

== Results ==
| Party | Votes | % | +/– | Seats | +/– |
|---|---|---|---|---|---|
| Anti-Socialist | 24,779 | 50.61 | ▲8.81 | 17 | ▼5 |
| Labour | 19,067 | 38.94 | ▲18.82 | 12 | ▲5 |
| Liberal Democrat (Robert Sadler) | 4,748 | 9.70 | ▼4.38 | 1 | ▼5 |
| Independent Labour | 366 | 0.75 | ▼3.11 | 0 | Steady |
| Total | 48,960 | 100.00 | – | 30 | – |
| Valid votes | 48,960 | 97.14 | | | |
| Invalid/blank votes | 1,442 | 2.86 | | | |
| Total votes | 50,402 | 100.00 | | | |
| Registered voters/turnout | 95,784 | 52.62 | | | |

Popular vote
| Anti-Socialist | 50.61% |
| Labour | 38.94% |
| Liberal Democrat | 9.70% |
| Independents | 0.75% |

Seats
| Anti-Socialist | 56.67% |
| Labour | 40.00% |
| Liberal Democrat | 3.33% |

== Distribution of seats ==
| Electorate | Seats won |
|---|---|
| Bass | |
| Darwin | |
| Denison | |
| Franklin | |
| Wilmot | |

| Anti-Socialist |
| Labour |
| Liberal Democrat |

== Aftermath ==
The Anti-Socialist Party (previously known as the Free Trade Party) held a majority of seats. It was a coalition of conservative and Liberal parliamentarians, exhorted by incumbent Premier John Evans to combine their forces against the threat from the Labour Party who had won an unprecedented 12 seats in 1905. Evans offered to resign if asked, and in June was taken to his word, with Elliott Lewis elected as leader and premier with a pledge of twelve months loyalty. A faction of Liberals within the Anti-Socialist Party, led by Norman Ewing, undermined Lewis' leadership, culminating in a no-confidence motion in October 1909, which brought down the government. The Governor of Tasmania Sir Harry Barron then called on John Earle to form Tasmania's first Labour ministry, a minority government that lasted only a week before being voted out by the House.

== See also ==
- Members of the Tasmanian House of Assembly, 1909–1912
- Candidates of the 1909 Tasmanian state election
