= George Pullen (politician) =

Australian politician

George Gerald Pullen (15 July 1873 – 14 June 1953) was an Australian politician. He was born in Sassafras, Tasmania. In 1912 he was elected to the Tasmanian House of Assembly as a Liberal member for Darwin. He was defeated in 1916 but re-elected as a Nationalist in 1919, this time representing Wilmot. He served until his second defeat in 1922. Pullen died in Barrington in 1953.
