= Division of Bass (state) =

State electoral division of Tasmania

Coordinates: 41.1300°S 147.6160°E

Bass Tasmania—House of Assembly
- Interactive map of boundaries since the 2021 state election
- State: Tasmania
- Created: 1909
- MP: Bridget Archer (Liberal); Rob Fairs (Liberal); Michael Ferguson (Liberal); Janie Finlay (Labor); Jess Greene (Labor); George Razay (independent); Cecily Rosol (Greens)
- Party: Greens (1), independent (1), Labor (2), Liberal (3)
- Namesake: George Bass
- Electors: 78,182 (2021)
- Area: 7,976 km^{2} (3,079.6 sq mi)
- Demographic: Mixed
- Federal electorate: Bass
- State electorate(s): Launceston; McIntyre; Rosevears; Windermere
Electorates around Bass:
Bass Strait	Bass Strait	Bass Strait
Braddon	Bass	Tasman Sea
Lyons	Lyons	Lyons

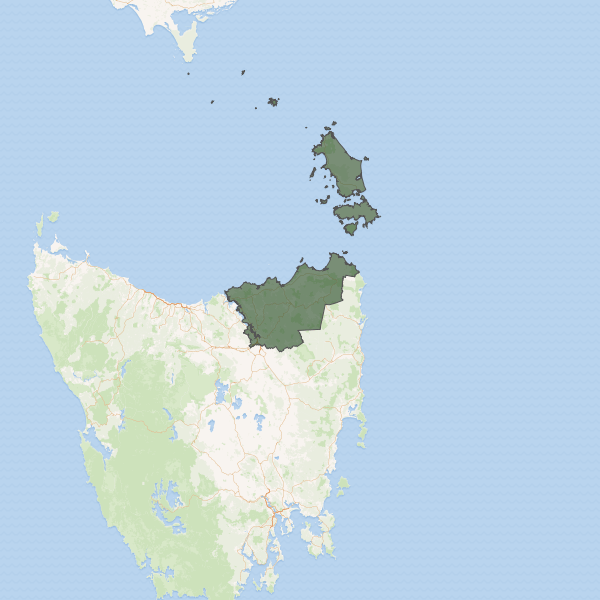
Division of Bass before the 2021 state election

The electoral division of Bass is one of the five electorates in the Tasmanian House of Assembly, it includes north-east Tasmania and Flinders Island. Bass takes its name from the British naval surgeon and explorer of Australia: George Bass. The division shares its name and boundaries with the federal division of Bass.

Bass and the other House of Assembly electoral divisions are each represented by seven members elected under the Hare-Clark electoral system.

== History and electoral profile ==
Bass was created in 1909 and includes the city of Launceston and towns in the states north east including: Scottsdale, Lilydale, St Helens, George Town and others.

== Representation ==
=== Distribution of seats ===
As 6-member seat:
Election	Seats won
1909–1912	
1912–1913	
1913–1916	
1916–1919	
1919–1922	
1922–1925	
1925–1928	
1928–1931	
1931–1934	
1934–1937	
1937–1941	
1941–1946	
1946–1948	
1948–1950	
1950–1955	
1955–1956	
1956–1959	

As 7-member seat:
Election	Seats won
1959–1964	
1964–1969	
1969–1972	
1972–1976	
1976–1979	
1979–1982	
1982–1986	
1986–1989	
1989–1992	
1992–1996	
1996–1998	

As 5-member seat:
Election	Seats won
1998–2002	
2002–2006	
2006–2010	
2010–2014	
2014–2018	
2018–2021	
2021–2024	

As 7-member seat:
Election	Seats won
2024–2025	
2025–	

Legend:
Labor
Liberal
Greens
Nationalist
Liberal
Anti-Socialist
Liberal (Lee)
Liberal Democrat
Independent

=== Members for Bass ===
Year	Member	Party	Member	Party	Member	Party	Member	Party	Member	Party	Member	Party	Member	Party
1909	6 seats (1909–1959)		Thomas Bakhap	Anti-Socialist	James Guy	Labor	Robert Sadler	Liberal Democrat	Charles Howroyd	Labor	Albert Solomon	Anti-Socialist	Richard McKenzie	Anti-Socialist
1912	6 seats (1909–1959)		Thomas Bakhap	Liberal	James Guy	Labor	George Becker	Labor	Charles Howroyd	Labor	Albert Solomon	Liberal	Richard McKenzie	Liberal
1913	6 seats (1909–1959)		Robert Sadler	Liberal	Arthur Anderson	Labor	George Becker	Labor	Charles Howroyd	Labor	Albert Solomon	Liberal	John Hayes	Liberal
1914	6 seats (1909–1959)		Robert Sadler	Liberal	Arthur Anderson	Labor	George Becker	Labor	Charles Howroyd	Labor	Alexander Marshall	Liberal	John Hayes	Liberal
1915	6 seats (1909–1959)		Robert Sadler	Liberal	James McDonald	Labor	George Becker	Labor	Charles Howroyd	Labor	Alexander Marshall	Liberal	John Hayes	Liberal
1916	6 seats (1909–1959)		Robert Sadler	Liberal	Allan Guy	Labor	George Becker	Labor	Charles Howroyd	Labor	Alexander Marshall	Liberal	John Hayes	Liberal
1917	6 seats (1909–1959)		Robert Sadler	Nationalist	Allan Guy	Labor	George Becker	Labor	Charles Howroyd	Nationalist	Alexander Marshall	Nationalist	John Hayes	Nationalist
1917	6 seats (1909–1959)		Robert Sadler	Nationalist	Allan Guy	Labor	George Becker	Labor	James Newton	Nationalist	Alexander Marshall	Nationalist	John Hayes	Nationalist
1919	6 seats (1909–1959)		Robert Sadler	Nationalist	Allan Guy	Labor	George Becker	Labor	James Newton	Nationalist	Alexander Marshall	Nationalist	John Hayes	Nationalist
1922	6 seats (1909–1959)		Jens Jensen	Independent Labor	Allan Guy	Labor	George Becker	Labor	James Newton	Nationalist	Alexander Marshall	Nationalist	John Hayes	Nationalist
1923	6 seats (1909–1959)		Jens Jensen	Independent Labor	Allan Guy	Labor	George Becker	Labor	James Newton	Nationalist	Alexander Marshall	Nationalist	George Shields	Nationalist
1925	6 seats (1909–1959)		Jens Jensen	Independent Labor	Allan Guy	Labor	George Becker	Labor	James Newton	Liberal	Alexander Marshall	Nationalist	George Shields	Nationalist
1925	6 seats (1909–1959)		Victor Shaw	Labor	Allan Guy	Labor	George Becker	Labor	James Newton	Liberal	Claude James	Liberal	Henry Thomson	Nationalist
1928	6 seats (1909–1959)		Victor Shaw	Labor	Allan Guy	Labor	George Becker	Labor	James Newton	Nationalist	Claude James	Nationalist	Henry Thomson	Nationalist
1928	6 seats (1909–1959)		Victor Shaw	Labor	Allan Guy	Labor	George Becker	Labor	John Ockerby	Nationalist	Claude James	Nationalist	Henry Thomson	Nationalist
1929	6 seats (1909–1959)		Victor Shaw	Labor	Thomas Davies	Labor	George Becker	Labor	John Ockerby	Nationalist	Claude James	Nationalist	Henry Thomson	Nationalist
1931	6 seats (1909–1959)		Victor Shaw	Labor	Thomas Davies	Labor	Robert Murphy	Nationalist	John Ockerby	Nationalist	Claude James	Nationalist	Howard Barber	Nationalist
1933	6 seats (1909–1959)		Victor Shaw	Labor	Thomas Davies	Labor	Robert Murphy	Nationalist	John Ockerby	Nationalist	Claude James	Nationalist	Herbert Postle	Nationalist
1934	6 seats (1909–1959)		Victor Shaw	Labor	Thomas Davies	Labor	John McDonald	Labor	John Ockerby	Nationalist	Claude James	Nationalist	Allen Hollingsworth	Nationalist
1936	6 seats (1909–1959)		John Madden	Labor	Thomas Davies	Labor	John McDonald	Labor	John Ockerby	Nationalist	Claude James	Nationalist	Allen Hollingsworth	Nationalist
1937	6 seats (1909–1959)		John Madden	Labor	Thomas Davies	Labor	John McDonald	Labor	John Ockerby	Nationalist	Eric Howroyd	Labor	Allen Hollingsworth	Nationalist
1941	6 seats (1909–1959)		John Madden	Labor	Thomas Davies	Labor	John McDonald	Labor	John Ockerby	Nationalist	Eric Howroyd	Labor	Frank Marriott	Nationalist
1942	6 seats (1909–1959)		John Madden	Labor	John Quintal	Labor	John McDonald	Labor	John Ockerby	Nationalist	Eric Howroyd	Labor	Frank Marriott	Nationalist
1945	6 seats (1909–1959)		John Madden	Labor	John Quintal	Labor	Alan Welsh	Labor	John Ockerby	Nationalist	Eric Howroyd	Labor	Frank Marriott	Nationalist
1946	6 seats (1909–1959)		John Madden	Labor	John Quintal	Labor	Alan Welsh	Labor	John Ockerby	Liberal	Eric Howroyd	Labor	Frank Marriott	Independent
1946	6 seats (1909–1959)		John Madden	Labor	Reg Turnbull	Labor	Bill Beattie	Liberal	Fred Marriott	Liberal	Eric Howroyd	Labor	Alexander Atkins	Labor
1948	6 seats (1909–1959)		John Madden	Labor	Reg Turnbull	Labor	Bill Beattie	Liberal	Fred Marriott	Liberal	Eric Howroyd	Labor	John Orchard	Liberal
1950	6 seats (1909–1959)		John Madden	Labor	Reg Turnbull	Labor	Claude Barnard	Labor	Fred Marriott	Liberal	John Steer	Liberal	John Orchard	Liberal
1954	6 seats (1909–1959)		John Madden	Labor	Reg Turnbull	Labor	Claude Barnard	Labor	Fred Marriott	Liberal	John Steer	Liberal	Bill Beattie	Liberal
1955	6 seats (1909–1959)		John Madden	Labor	Reg Turnbull	Labor	Claude Barnard	Labor	Fred Marriott	Liberal	John Steer	Liberal	Bill Beattie	Liberal
1956	6 seats (1909–1959)		Alexander Atkins	Labor	Reg Turnbull	Labor	Claude Barnard	Labor	Fred Marriott	Liberal	John Steer	Liberal	Bill Beattie	Liberal
1957	6 seats (1909–1959)		Alexander Atkins	Labor	Reg Turnbull	Labor	John Madden	Labor	Fred Marriott	Liberal	John Steer	Liberal	Bill Beattie	Liberal
1959	Mac Le Fevre	Labor	Alexander Atkins	Labor	Reg Turnbull	Independent	John Madden	Labor	Fred Marriott	Liberal	John Steer	Liberal	Bill Beattie	Liberal
1961	Mac Le Fevre	Labor	Alexander Atkins	Labor	Wallace Fraser	Labor	John Madden	Labor	James McGowen	Liberal	Max Bushby	Liberal	Bill Beattie	Liberal
1964	Mac Le Fevre	Labor	Alexander Atkins	Labor	Wallace Fraser	Labor	John Madden	Labor	John Steer	Liberal	Max Bushby	Liberal	Bill Beattie	Liberal
1968	Mac Le Fevre	Labor	Alexander Atkins	Labor	Wallace Fraser	Labor	John Madden	Labor	James Henty	Liberal	Max Bushby	Liberal	Bill Beattie	Liberal
1969	Allan Foster	Labor	Alexander Atkins	Labor	Michael Barnard	Labor	Timothy Barrenger	Liberal	James Henty	Liberal	Max Bushby	Liberal	Bill Beattie	Liberal
1972	Allan Foster	Labor	David Farquhar	Labor	Michael Barnard	Labor	Mac Le Fevre	Labor	Neil Pitt	Liberal	Max Bushby	Liberal	Bill Beattie	Liberal
1974	Harry Holgate	Labor	David Farquhar	Labor	Michael Barnard	Labor	Mac Le Fevre	Labor	Neil Pitt	Liberal	Max Bushby	Liberal	Bill Beattie	Liberal
1976	Harry Holgate	Labor	Gill James	Labor	Michael Barnard	Labor	Jim Mooney	Liberal	Neil Robson	Liberal	Max Bushby	Liberal	Bill Beattie	Liberal
1979	Harry Holgate	Labor	Gill James	Labor	Michael Barnard	Labor	Mary Willey	Labor	Neil Robson	Liberal	Max Bushby	Liberal	John Beswick	Liberal
1981	Harry Holgate	Labor	Gill James	Labor	Michael Barnard	Labor	Mary Willey	Independent	Neil Robson	Liberal	Max Bushby	Liberal	John Beswick	Liberal
1982	Harry Holgate	Labor	Gill James	Labor	Michael Barnard	Labor	Brendan Lyons	Liberal	Neil Robson	Liberal	Max Bushby	Liberal	John Beswick	Liberal
1984	Harry Holgate	Labor	Gill James	Labor	Peter Patmore	Labor	Brendan Lyons	Liberal	Neil Robson	Liberal	Max Bushby	Liberal	John Beswick	Liberal
1986	Harry Holgate	Labor	Gill James	Labor	Peter Patmore	Labor	Peter Rae	Liberal	Neil Robson	Liberal	Frank Madill	Liberal	John Beswick	Liberal
1989	Harry Holgate	Labor	Jim Cox	Labor	Peter Patmore	Labor	Lance Armstrong	Greens	Neil Robson	Liberal	Frank Madill	Liberal	John Beswick	Liberal
1992	Tony Benneworth	Liberal	Gill James	Labor	Peter Patmore	Labor	Lance Armstrong	Greens	Sue Napier	Liberal	Frank Madill	Liberal	John Beswick	Liberal
1996	Tony Benneworth	Liberal	Gill James	Labor	Peter Patmore	Labor	Jim Cox	Labor	Sue Napier	Liberal	Frank Madill	Liberal	John Beswick	Liberal
1998	5 seats (1998–2024)		Gill James	Labor	Peter Patmore	Labor	Jim Cox	Labor	Sue Napier	Liberal	Frank Madill	Liberal	5 seats (1998–2024)	
2000	5 seats (1998–2024)		Gill James	Labor	Peter Patmore	Labor	Jim Cox	Labor	Sue Napier	Liberal	David Fry	Liberal	5 seats (1998–2024)	
2002	5 seats (1998–2024)		Kim Booth	Greens	Kathryn Hay	Labor	Jim Cox	Labor	Sue Napier	Liberal	Peter Gutwein	Liberal	5 seats (1998–2024)	
2006	5 seats (1998–2024)		Kim Booth	Greens	Michelle O'Byrne	Labor	Jim Cox	Labor	Sue Napier	Liberal	Peter Gutwein	Liberal	5 seats (1998–2024)	
2010	5 seats (1998–2024)		Kim Booth	Greens	Michelle O'Byrne	Labor	Brian Wightman	Labor	Michael Ferguson	Liberal	Peter Gutwein	Liberal	5 seats (1998–2024)	
2014	5 seats (1998–2024)		Kim Booth	Greens	Michelle O'Byrne	Labor	Sarah Courtney	Liberal	Michael Ferguson	Liberal	Peter Gutwein	Liberal	5 seats (1998–2024)	
2015	5 seats (1998–2024)		Andrea Dawkins	Greens	Michelle O'Byrne	Labor	Sarah Courtney	Liberal	Michael Ferguson	Liberal	Peter Gutwein	Liberal	5 seats (1998–2024)	
2018	5 seats (1998–2024)		Jennifer Houston	Labor	Michelle O'Byrne	Labor	Sarah Courtney	Liberal	Michael Ferguson	Liberal	Peter Gutwein	Liberal	5 seats (1998–2024)	
2021	5 seats (1998–2024)		Janie Finlay	Labor	Michelle O'Byrne	Labor	Sarah Courtney	Liberal	Michael Ferguson	Liberal	Peter Gutwein	Liberal	5 seats (1998–2024)	
2022	5 seats (1998–2024)		Janie Finlay	Labor	Michelle O'Byrne	Labor	Lara Alexander	Liberal	Michael Ferguson	Liberal	Simon Wood	Liberal	5 seats (1998–2024)	
2023	5 seats (1998–2024)		Janie Finlay	Labor	Michelle O'Byrne	Labor	Lara Alexander	Independent	Michael Ferguson	Liberal	Simon Wood	Liberal	5 seats (1998–2024)	
2024	Cecily Rosol	Greens	Janie Finlay	Labor	Michelle O'Byrne	Labor	Rebekah Pentland	Jacqui Lambie	Michael Ferguson	Liberal	Simon Wood	Liberal	Rob Fairs	Liberal
2024	Cecily Rosol	Greens	Janie Finlay	Labor	Michelle O'Byrne	Labor	Rebekah Pentland	Independent	Michael Ferguson	Liberal	Simon Wood	Liberal	Rob Fairs	Liberal
2025	Cecily Rosol	Greens	Janie Finlay	Labor	Jess Greene	Labor	George Razay	Independent	Michael Ferguson	Liberal	Bridget Archer	Liberal	Rob Fairs	Liberal

== Election results ==

Vote totals given here are first round vote tallies.

2025 Tasmanian state election: Bass
Party	Candidate	Votes	%	±%
Quota		8,432		
Liberal	Bridget Archer (elected 1)	13,108	19.4	+19.4
Liberal	Michael Ferguson (elected 3)	6,881	10.2	−7.9
Liberal	Rob Fairs (elected 5)	3,717	5.5	−2.9
Liberal	Simon Wood	1,348	2.0	−0.8
Liberal	Julie Sladden	1,747	1.9	−0.7
Liberal	Chris Gatenby	1,504	1.8	−0.4
Liberal	Sarah Quaile	1,448	0.9	−1.2
Labor	Janie Finlay (elected 2)	8,797	13.0	+2.2
Labor	Geoff Lyons	2,339	3.5	+1.0
Labor	Jess Greene (elected 7)	2,256	3.3	+3.3
Labor	Luke Moore	1,499	2.2	+2.2
Labor	Melissa Anderson	852	2.0	+0.7
Labor	William Gordon	1,112	1.9	+0.3
Labor	Peter Thomas	443	1.5	+1.5
Greens	Cecily Rosol (elected 4)	6,566	9.7	+3.4
Greens	Lauren Ball	1,013	1.5	+0.3
Greens	Charlene McLennan	871	1.3	+1.3
Greens	Anne Layton-Bennett	828	1.2	+0.2
Greens	Tom Hall	711	1.1	+0.1
Greens	Eric March	577	0.8	+0.8
Greens	Jack Fittler	542	0.8	+0.2
Shooters, Fishers, Farmers	Michal Frydrych	2,754	4.0	+1.6
Independent	George Razay (elected 6)	2,347	3.5	+1.7
Independent	Rebekah Pentland	1,705	2.5	−1.0
National	Angela Armstrong	684	1.0	−2.0
National	Carl Cooper	683	1.0	+1.0
Independent	Tim Walker	417	0.6	−0.2
Independent	Jack Davenport	405	0.6	+0.2
Independent	Caroline Larner	246	0.4	+0.4
Independent	Fenella Edwards	181	0.3	+0.3
Independent	Daniel Groat	135	0.2	+0.2
Total formal votes		67,450	93.6	+0.1
Informal votes		4,543	6.4	−0.1
Turnout		71,993	89.4	−1.2
Party total votes
Liberal		28,193	41.8	+3.8
Labor		18,564	27.5	-2.3
Greens		11,136	16.5	+4.5
Shooters, Fishers, Farmers		2,754	4.0	+1.6
Independent	George Razay	2,347	3.5	+1.7
Independent	Rebekah Pentland	1,705	2.5	−1.0
National		1,367	2.0	+2.0
Independent	Tim Walker	417	0.6	−0.2
Independent	Jack Davenport	405	0.6	+0.2
Independent	Caroline Larner	246	0.4	+0.4
Independent	Fenella Edwards	181	0.3	+0.3
Independent	Daniel Groat	135	0.2	+0.2
Independent gain from Lambie				

== See also ==
- Tasmanian Legislative Council
