= Alexander Hean =

Australian politician

Alexander Hean CMG (11 June 1859 – 11 January 1927) was a Scottish-born Australian politician.

He was born in Lochee in Scotland. In 1903 he was elected to the Tasmanian House of Assembly as the member for Sorell. When proportional representation was introduced in 1909 he was elected as one of the Anti-Socialist members for Franklin. Becoming a Liberal, he was re-elected in 1912 but lost his seat in 1913. In 1916 he returned to the House and the following year became a Nationalist. He held the seat until his retirement in 1925. Hean died in Sorell in 1927.
