= Jonathan Best =

Australian politician

Jonathan Best (19 August 1840 – 13 May 1913) was an Australian politician. He was born in Launceston, Van Diemen's Land. In 1894 he was elected to the Tasmanian House of Assembly as the member for Deloraine. He was defeated in 1897 but served again from 1899 to 1909, when proportional representation was introduced. He was elected as one of the members for Wilmot and served until his defeat in 1912; he was re-elected in 1913 but died in office at Launceston later that year. He was a member of the Anti-Socialist and Liberal parties.
