= Arthur Anderson (politician) =

Australian politician

Member of the Tasmanian House of Assembly for Bass
- In office 23 January 1913 – 5 May 1915
- Preceded by: James Guy
- Succeeded by: James McDonald

Personal details
- Born: 1860 Sydney, Colony of New South Wales
- Died: 15 May 1915 (aged 54–55) Launceston, Tasmania, Australia
- Party: Labor

Arthur Anderson (1860 – 5 May 1915) was an Australian politician.

He was born in Sydney. In 1913 he was elected to the Tasmanian House of Assembly as a Labor member for Bass. He held the seat until his death in Launceston in 1915.

Tasmanian House of Assembly
Preceded by James Guy	Member for Bass; 1913–1915	Succeeded by James McDonald
