= George Martin (Tasmanian politician) =

Australian politician

George Frederick Martin (9 June 1876 – 28 November 1946) was an Australian politician.

He was born in Hayes Siding in Tasmania. In 1912 he was elected to the Tasmanian House of Assembly as a Labor member for Franklin. He was defeated in 1916. Martin died in Launceston in 1946.
