= Division of Franklin (state) =

Tasmanian state electoral division

Coordinates: 43.2240°S 146.7110°E

Franklin Tasmania—House of Assembly
- Interactive map of boundaries since the 2021 state election
- State: Tasmania
- Created: 1909
- MP: Eric Abetz (Liberal); Meg Brown (Labor); Peter George (independent); David O'Byrne (independent); Jacquie Petrusma (Liberal); Rosalie Woodruff (Greens); Dean Winter (Labor)
- Party: Labor (2), Liberal (2), Greens (1), independent (2)
- Namesake: Sir John Franklin
- Electors: 79,290 (2018)
- Area: 6,911 km^{2} (2,668.4 sq mi)
- Demographic: Mixed
- Federal electorate: Franklin
- State electorate(s): Huon; Nelson; Pembroke; Rumney
Electorates around Franklin:
Braddon	Clark	Lyons
Braddon	Franklin	Tasman Sea
Southern Ocean	Southern Ocean	Southern Ocean

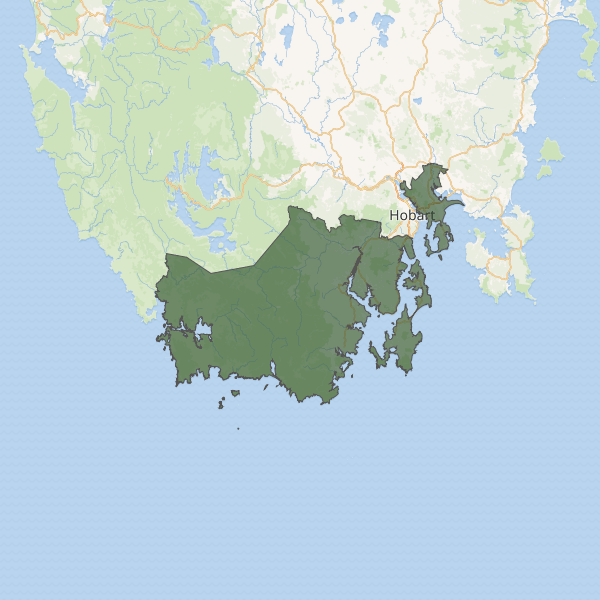
Division of Franklin before the 2021 state election

The electoral division of Franklin is one of the five electorates in the Tasmanian House of Assembly, located in southern Tasmania and includes Bruny Island, Kingston and the eastern shore of the River Derwent. Franklin is named after Sir John Franklin, the Arctic explorer who was Lieutenant-Governor of Van Diemen's Land (1837–43). The division shares its name and boundaries with the federal division of Franklin.

Franklin and the other House of Assembly electoral divisions are each represented by seven members elected under the Hare-Clark electoral system.

== History and electoral profile ==
Franklin includes most of the suburbs of Hobart, such as Kingston, Seven Mile Beach and Lauderdale as well as the rural towns of Huonville, Franklin, Cygnet, Margate and Bruny Island. The subantarctic Macquarie Island is also part of the electorate. The division measures 6,911 km^{2}.

== Representation ==
=== Distribution of seats ===
As 6-member seat:
Election	Seats won
1909–1912	
1912–1913	
1913–1916	
1916–1919	
1919–1922	
1922–1925	
1925–1928	
1928–1931	
1931–1934	
1934–1937	
1937–1941	
1941–1946	
1946–1948	
1948–1950	
1950–1955	
1955–1956	
1956–1959	

As 7-member seat:
Election	Seats won
1959–1964	
1964–1969	
1969–1972	
1972–1976	
1976–1979	
1979–1982	
1982–1986	
1986–1989	
1989–1992	
1992–1996	
1996–1998	

As 5-member seat:
Election	Seats won
1998–2002	
2002–2006	
2006–2010	
2010–2014	
2014–2018	
2018–2021	
2021–2024	

As 7-member seat:
Election	Seats won
2024–2025	
2025–	

Legend:
Labor
Liberal
Greens
Nationalist
Liberal
Anti-Socialist
Country
Independent

=== Members for Franklin ===
Year	Member	Party	Member	Party	Member	Party	Member	Party	Member	Party	Member	Party	Member	Party
1909	David Dicker	Labor	Thomas Hodgman	Anti-Socialist	John Earle	Labor	Norman Ewing	Anti-Socialist	Alexander Hean	Anti-Socialist	(Sir) John Evans	Anti-Socialist	6 seats (1909–1959)	
1912	David Dicker	Labor	George Martin	Labor	John Earle	Labor	Norman Ewing	Liberal	Alexander Hean	Liberal	(Sir) John Evans	Liberal	6 seats (1909–1959)	
1913	David Dicker	Labor	George Martin	Labor	John Earle	Labor	Norman Ewing	Liberal	Arthur Cotton	Liberal	(Sir) John Evans	Liberal	6 seats (1909–1959)	
1915	David Dicker	Labor	George Martin	Labor	John Earle	Labor	Daniel Ryan	Liberal	Arthur Cotton	Liberal	(Sir) John Evans	Liberal	6 seats (1909–1959)	
1916	David Dicker	Labor	William Shoobridge	Labor	John Earle	Labor	Frederick Burbury	Liberal	Alexander Hean	Liberal	(Sir) John Evans	Liberal	6 seats (1909–1959)	
1917	David Dicker	Labor	William Shoobridge	Labor	John Earle	Nationalist	Frederick Burbury	Nationalist	Alexander Hean	Nationalist	(Sir) John Evans	Nationalist	6 seats (1909–1959)	
1917	David Dicker	Labor	William Shoobridge	Labor	Arthur Cotton	Nationalist	Frederick Burbury	Nationalist	Alexander Hean	Nationalist	(Sir) John Evans	Nationalist	6 seats (1909–1959)	
1919	David Dicker	Labor	Albert Ogilvie	Labor	Benjamin Watkins	Labor	William Dixon	Nationalist	Alexander Hean	Nationalist	(Sir) John Evans	Nationalist	6 seats (1909–1959)	
1922	David Dicker	Independent	Albert Ogilvie	Labor	Benjamin Watkins	Labor	William Dixon	Country	Alexander Hean	Nationalist	(Sir) John Evans	Nationalist	6 seats (1909–1959)	
1922	William Pearce	Labor	Albert Ogilvie	Labor	Peter Murdoch	Nationalist	John Piggott	Country	Alexander Hean	Nationalist	(Sir) John Evans	Nationalist	6 seats (1909–1959)	
1922	William Shoobridge	Labor	Albert Ogilvie	Labor	Peter Murdoch	Nationalist	John Piggott	Country	Alexander Hean	Nationalist	(Sir) John Evans	Nationalist	6 seats (1909–1959)	
1925	Benjamin Watkins	Labor	Albert Ogilvie	Labor	Peter Murdoch	Independent	John Piggott	Independent	William Sheridan	Labor	(Sir) John Evans	Nationalist	6 seats (1909–1959)	
1928	Benjamin Watkins	Labor	Albert Ogilvie	Labor	Benjamin Pearsall	Independent	John Piggott	Nationalist	Henry Baker	Nationalist	(Sir) John Evans	Nationalist	6 seats (1909–1959)	
1931	Benjamin Watkins	Independent	Albert Ogilvie	Labor	John Dwyer	Labor	Alfred Seabrook	Nationalist	Henry Baker	Nationalist	(Sir) John Evans	Nationalist	6 seats (1909–1959)	
1934	Edward Brooker	Labor	Albert Ogilvie	Labor	John Dwyer	Labor	Benjamin Pearsall	Independent	Henry Baker	Nationalist	(Sir) John Evans	Nationalist	6 seats (1909–1959)	
1937	Edward Brooker	Labor	Albert Ogilvie	Labor	John Dwyer	Labor	Basil Plummer	Labor	Henry Baker	Nationalist	George Doyle	Nationalist	6 seats (1909–1959)	
1939	Edward Brooker	Labor	Francis McDermott	Labor	John Dwyer	Labor	Basil Plummer	Labor	Henry Baker	Nationalist	George Doyle	Nationalist	6 seats (1909–1959)	
1940	Edward Brooker	Labor	Francis McDermott	Labor	John Dwyer	Labor	Basil Plummer	Labor	Henry Baker	Nationalist	Vincent Shoobridge	Nationalist	6 seats (1909–1959)	
1941	Edward Brooker	Labor	Henry Hope	Labor	John Dwyer	Labor	Thomas McKinley	Labor	Henry Baker	Nationalist	Sir John McPhee	Nationalist	6 seats (1909–1959)	
1946	Edward Brooker	Labor	Bill Neilson	Labor	John Dwyer	Labor	George Gray	Independent	Reg Wright	Liberal	Tim Jackson	Liberal	6 seats (1909–1959)	
1948	John Brown	Labor	Bill Neilson	Labor	John Dwyer	Labor	George Gray	Independent	Reg Wright	Liberal	Tim Jackson	Liberal	6 seats (1909–1959)	
1948	Charles Hand	Labor	Bill Neilson	Labor	John Dwyer	Labor	George Gray	Independent	Reg Wright	Liberal	Tim Jackson	Liberal	6 seats (1909–1959)	
1949	Charles Hand	Labor	Bill Neilson	Labor	John Dwyer	Labor	George Gray	Independent	Archibald Park	Liberal	Tim Jackson	Liberal	6 seats (1909–1959)	
1950	Charles Hand	Labor	Bill Neilson	Labor	John Dwyer	Labor	Thomas Pearsall	Liberal	Archibald Park	Liberal	Tim Jackson	Liberal	6 seats (1909–1959)	
1955	Charles Hand	Labor	Bill Neilson	Labor	John Dwyer	Labor	Thomas Pearsall	Liberal	Mabel Miller	Liberal	Tim Jackson	Liberal	6 seats (1909–1959)	
1956	Brian Crawford	Labor	Bill Neilson	Labor	John Dwyer	Labor	Thomas Pearsall	Liberal	Mabel Miller	Liberal	Tim Jackson	Liberal	6 seats (1909–1959)	
1959	Eric Barnard	Labor	Bill Neilson	Labor	John Dwyer	Labor	Thomas Pearsall	Liberal	Mabel Miller	Liberal	Tim Jackson	Liberal	Bill Young	Liberal
1960	Eric Barnard	Labor	Bill Neilson	Labor	John Dwyer	Labor	Thomas Pearsall	Liberal	Mabel Miller	Liberal	Tim Jackson	Independent	Bill Young	Liberal
1962	Eric Barnard	Labor	Bill Neilson	Labor	Lynda Heaven	Labor	Thomas Pearsall	Liberal	Mabel Miller	Liberal	Tim Jackson	Independent	Bill Young	Liberal
1964	Eric Barnard	Labor	Bill Neilson	Labor	Terry Martin	Labor	Thomas Pearsall	Liberal	Jack Frost	Labor	Doug Clark	Liberal	Bill Young	Liberal
1966	Eric Barnard	Labor	Bill Neilson	Labor	Terry Martin	Labor	Eric Iles	Liberal	Jack Frost	Labor	Doug Clark	Liberal	Bill Young	Liberal
1969	Eric Barnard	Labor	Bill Neilson	Labor	Doug Lowe	Labor	Stanley Gough	Liberal	Jack Frost	Labor	Doug Clark	Liberal	Geoff Pearsall	Liberal
1972	Eric Barnard	Labor	Bill Neilson	Labor	Doug Lowe	Labor	John Beattie	Liberal	Jack Frost	Labor	Doug Clark	Liberal	Geoff Pearsall	Liberal
1976	Eric Barnard	Labor	Bill Neilson	Labor	Doug Lowe	Labor	John Beattie	Liberal	Ray Sherry	Labor	Steve Gilmour	Liberal	Geoff Pearsall	Liberal
1977	Eric Barnard	Labor	Bill McKinnon	Labor	Doug Lowe	Labor	John Beattie	Liberal	Ray Sherry	Labor	Steve Gilmour	Liberal	Geoff Pearsall	Liberal
1979	Eric Barnard	Labor	Dick Adams	Labor	Doug Lowe	Labor	John Beattie	Liberal	Michael Aird	Labor	John Cleary	Liberal	Geoff Pearsall	Liberal
1979	Bill McKinnon	Labor	Dick Adams	Labor	Doug Lowe	Labor	John Beattie	Liberal	Michael Aird	Labor	John Cleary	Liberal	Geoff Pearsall	Liberal
1981	Bill McKinnon	Labor	Dick Adams	Labor	Doug Lowe	Independent	John Beattie	Liberal	Michael Aird	Labor	John Cleary	Liberal	Geoff Pearsall	Liberal
1982	Bill McKinnon	Labor	Ken Wriedt	Labor	Doug Lowe	Independent	John Beattie	Liberal	Michael Aird	Labor	John Cleary	Liberal	Geoff Pearsall	Liberal
1986	Gerry Bates	Greens	Ken Wriedt	Labor	Fran Bladel	Labor	John Beattie	Liberal	Peter Hodgman	Liberal	Nick Evers	Liberal	Geoff Pearsall	Liberal
1988	Gerry Bates	Greens	Ken Wriedt	Labor	Fran Bladel	Labor	John Beattie	Liberal	Peter Hodgman	Liberal	Nick Evers	Liberal	John Cleary	Liberal
1989	Gerry Bates	Greens	Ken Wriedt	Labor	Fran Bladel	Labor	Michael Aird	Labor	Peter Hodgman	Liberal	Nick Evers	Liberal	John Cleary	Liberal
1990	Gerry Bates	Greens	Paul Lennon	Labor	Fran Bladel	Labor	Michael Aird	Labor	Peter Hodgman	Liberal	Brian Davison	Liberal	John Cleary	Liberal
1992	Gerry Bates	Greens	Paul Lennon	Labor	Fran Bladel	Labor	Michael Aird	Labor	Peter Hodgman	Liberal	Brian Davison	Liberal	John Cleary	Liberal
1995	Mike Foley	Greens	Paul Lennon	Labor	Fran Bladel	Labor	John Sheppard	Labor	Peter Hodgman	Liberal	Brian Davison	Liberal	John Cleary	Liberal
1996	Mike Foley	Greens	Paul Lennon	Labor	Fran Bladel	Labor	Paula Wriedt	Labor	Peter Hodgman	Liberal	Bruce Goodluck	Independent	John Cleary	Liberal
1998	Matt Smith	Liberal	Paul Lennon	Labor	Fran Bladel	Labor	Paula Wriedt	Labor	Peter Hodgman	Liberal	5 seats (1998–2024)			
2001	Matt Smith	Liberal	Paul Lennon	Labor	Fran Bladel	Labor	Paula Wriedt	Labor	Martin McManus	Liberal	5 seats (1998–2024)			
2002	Matt Smith	Liberal	Paul Lennon	Labor	Neville Oliver	Labor	Paula Wriedt	Labor	Martin McManus	Liberal	5 seats (1998–2024)			
2002	Nick McKim	Greens	Paul Lennon	Labor	Lara Giddings	Labor	Paula Wriedt	Labor	Will Hodgman	Liberal	5 seats (1998–2024)			
2006	Nick McKim	Greens	Paul Lennon	Labor	Lara Giddings	Labor	Paula Wriedt	Labor	Will Hodgman	Liberal	5 seats (1998–2024)			
2008	Nick McKim	Greens	Ross Butler	Labor	Lara Giddings	Labor	Paula Wriedt	Labor	Will Hodgman	Liberal	5 seats (1998–2024)			
2009	Nick McKim	Greens	Ross Butler	Labor	Lara Giddings	Labor	Daniel Hulme	Labor	Will Hodgman	Liberal	5 seats (1998–2024)			
2010	Nick McKim	Greens	David O'Byrne	Labor	Lara Giddings	Labor	Jacquie Petrusma	Liberal	Will Hodgman	Liberal	5 seats (1998–2024)			
2014	Nick McKim	Greens	Paul Harriss	Liberal	Lara Giddings	Labor	Jacquie Petrusma	Liberal	Will Hodgman	Liberal	5 seats (1998–2024)			
2015	Rosalie Woodruff	Greens	Paul Harriss	Liberal	Lara Giddings	Labor	Jacquie Petrusma	Liberal	Will Hodgman	Liberal	5 seats (1998–2024)			
2016	Rosalie Woodruff	Greens	Nic Street	Liberal	Lara Giddings	Labor	Jacquie Petrusma	Liberal	Will Hodgman	Liberal	5 seats (1998–2024)			
2018	Rosalie Woodruff	Greens	David O'Byrne	Labor	Alison Standen	Labor	Jacquie Petrusma	Liberal	Will Hodgman	Liberal	5 seats (1998–2024)			
2020	Rosalie Woodruff	Greens	David O'Byrne	Labor	Alison Standen	Labor	Jacquie Petrusma	Liberal	Nic Street	Liberal	5 seats (1998–2024)			
2021	Rosalie Woodruff	Greens	David O'Byrne	Labor	Dean Winter	Labor	Jacquie Petrusma	Liberal	Nic Street	Liberal	5 seats (1998–2024)			
2021	Rosalie Woodruff	Greens	David O'Byrne	Independent Labor	Dean Winter	Labor	Jacquie Petrusma	Liberal	Nic Street	Liberal	5 seats (1998–2024)			
2022	Rosalie Woodruff	Greens	David O'Byrne	Independent Labor	Dean Winter	Labor	Dean Young	Liberal	Nic Street	Liberal	5 seats (1998–2024)			
2024	Rosalie Woodruff	Greens	David O'Byrne	Independent	Dean Winter	Labor	Dean Young	Liberal	Nic Street	Liberal	5 seats (1998–2024)			
2024	Rosalie Woodruff	Greens	David O'Byrne	Independent	Dean Winter	Labor	Jacquie Petrusma	Liberal	Nic Street	Liberal	Eric Abetz	Liberal	Meg Brown	Labor
2025	Rosalie Woodruff	Greens	David O'Byrne	Independent	Dean Winter	Labor	Jacquie Petrusma	Liberal	Peter George	Independent	Eric Abetz	Liberal	Meg Brown	Labor

== Election results ==

2025 Tasmanian state election: Franklin
Party	Candidate	Votes	%	±%
Quota		9,126		
Liberal	Eric Abetz (elected 2)	9,109	12.5	+3.3
Liberal	Jacquie Petrusma (elected 6)	5,835	8.0	−0.5
Liberal	Nic Street	3,719	5.1	−1.6
Liberal	Dean Young	2,241	3.1	−1.2
Liberal	Josh Garvin	1,611	2.2	+0.9
Liberal	Michele Howlett	1,293	1.8	+1.8
Liberal	Natasha Miller	1,282	1.8	+1.8
Labor	Dean Winter (elected 5)	8,241	11.3	+0.1
Labor	Meg Brown (elected 7)	3,196	4.4	+0.6
Labor	Jess Munday	2,169	3.0	+3.0
Labor	Kaspar Deane	1,416	1.9	−0.6
Labor	Amelia Meyers	687	0.9	+0.9
Labor	Chris Hannan	524	0.7	−1.3
Labor	Traycee di Virgilio	396	0.5	+0.5
Group C	Peter George (elected 1)	11,499	15.8	+15.8
Group C	Kirsten Bacon	231	0.3	+0.3
Group C	Andrew Jenner	191	0.3	+0.3
Group C	Anthony Houston	179	0.2	+0.2
Group C	Louise Cherrie	146	0.2	+0.2
Group C	Rayne Allinson	143	0.2	+0.2
Group C	Chrissie Materia	110	0.2	+0.2
Greens	Rosalie Woodruff (elected 3)	7,124	9.8	−3.9
Greens	Owen Fitzgerald	811	1.1	+0.2
Greens	Carly Allen	600	0.8	+0.8
Greens	Gideon Cordover	384	0.5	−0.6
Greens	Brian Chapman	375	0.5	+0.5
Greens	Mark Donnellon	333	0.5	+0.5
Greens	Adi Munshi	257	0.4	+0.4
Independent	David O'Byrne (elected 4)	8,223	11.3	+2.5
Independent	Hans Jurriaan Willink	352	0.5	+0.5
Independent	Sarah Gibbens	330	0.5	+0.5
Total formal votes		73,007	95.2	+0.6
Informal votes		3,738	4.8	−0.6
Turnout		76,745	91.4	−1.0
Party total votes
Liberal		25,090	34.4	+0.4
Labor		16,629	22.8	−4.5
Group C		12,499	17.1	+17.1
Greens		9,884	13.5	−6.3
Independent	David O'Byrne	8,223	11.3	+2.5
Independent	Hans Jurriaan Willink	352	0.5	+0.5
Independent	Sarah Gibbens	330	0.5	+0.5
Independent gain from Liberal				

== See also ==
- Tasmanian Legislative Council
