= Robert Sadler =

Australian politician

Bob Sadler

Robert James Sadler (7 January 1846 – 10 May 1923) was an Australian politician.

He was born in Launceston. Sadler was elected Mayor of the city for 1897. In 1900 he was elected to the Tasmanian House of Assembly as the Liberal Democrat member for Launceston. He moved to Central Launceston in 1903 and was elected as one of the six members for Bass with the introduction of proportional representation in 1909. He was defeated in 1912, but returned to the House in the next year's election. He was Chair of Committees from 1913 to 1914 and from 1916 to 1922. He retired in 1922 and died in Launceston the following year.
