= Arthur Cotton (politician) =

Australian politician

Arthur Cotton (9 January 1853 – 6 December 1920) was an Australian politician in Tasmania.

He was born in Cranbrook in Van Diemen's Land. In 1913 he was elected to the Tasmanian House of Assembly as a Liberal member for Franklin. He was defeated in 1916 but returned in a by-election in 1917 after the appointment of John Earle to the Senate. He was defeated again in 1919 and died in Swansea in 1920.
