= David Dicker =

Australian politician (1882–1967)

David Edward Dicker (21 April 1882 – 7 February 1967) was an Australian politician.

He was born in Clarence. In 1909 he was elected to the Tasmanian House of Assembly as a Labor member for Franklin. In 1917 he was charged with treason over anti-British statements, which led to his removal from the Public Works Committee.

In January 1922, the Labor Party refused his nomination for preselection for his seat at the 1922 election over a dispute relating to past organising work with the Australian Workers' Union. He nominated to recontest his seat as an independent, and was expelled from the party for disloyalty in May before going on to lose his seat.

He was refused readmission to the Labor Party as late as 1935, but was eventually readmitted. Dicker died in Gordon in 1967.
