= John Evans (Australian politician) =

Australian politician

Sir John Evans CMG
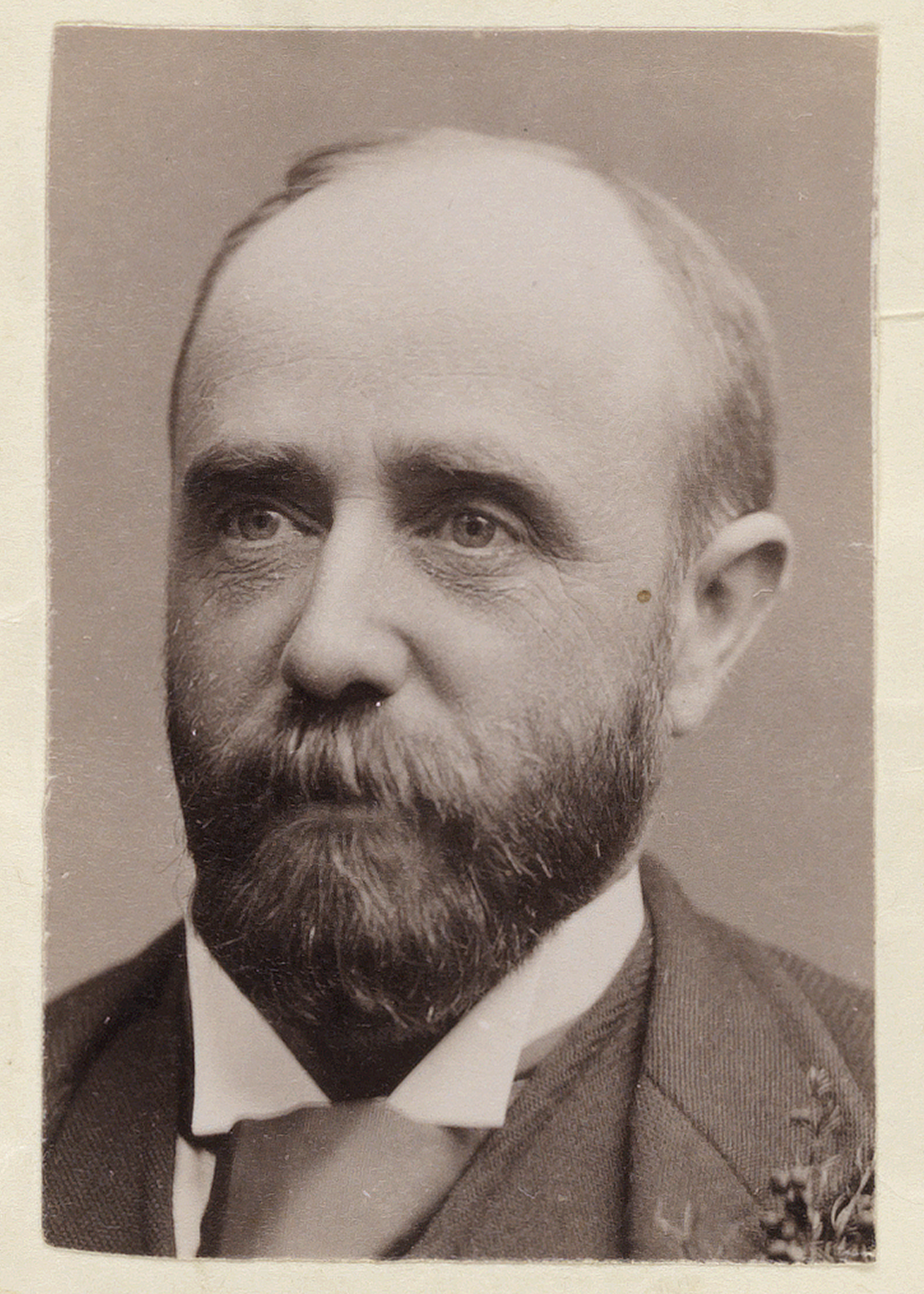
- Evans c. 1894

21st Premier of Tasmania
- In office 11 July 1904 – 19 June 1909
- Preceded by: William Propsting
- Succeeded by: Sir Elliott Lewis

Personal details
- Born: John William Evans; 1 December 1855 Liverpool, England
- Died: 2 October 1943 (aged 87) Hobart, Australia
- Resting place: Cornelian Bay, Tasmania
- Spouse: Emily Harcourt (m. 1883; died 1941)

Sir John William Evans, CMG (1 December 1855 – 2 October 1943) was an Australian politician, sea captain and businessman. He was premier of Tasmania from 1904 to 1909 and served in the Tasmanian House of Assembly from 1897 to 1937, including as speaker of the House on several occasions.

== Early life ==
Evans was born on 1 December 1855 in Liverpool, England. He was the son of Mary Ann (née Fisher) and George Matthew Evans, a merchant seaman.

Evans and his family moved to Tasmania in 1859, settling in Hobart's Battery Point. He was educated privately at the Collegiate School run by Alexander Ireland. His father became a part-owner of the barque Helen and as a child he travelled with his parents on journeys to China and Japan. He learned seamanship aboard Helen and as second mate on Wynaud and Harriet McGregor.

== Maritime career and business activities ==
In 1878, Evans joined the Tasmanian Steam Navigation Company and became a captain in its steamship service. On 30 November 1883 he was in command of SS Tasman when it struck a reef near Hippolyte Rocks. Tasman was on a voyage from Sydney to Hobart with 27 officers and crew and 29 passengers on board. The ship was evacuated and sank rapidly, with all cargo lost. An inquiry found that the ship's chief mate Frederick Marshall had caused the wreck by steering the ship between the Hippolyte Rocks and Cheverton Rock, contrary to Evans' express orders. Marshall's certificate was suspended for 12 months and Evans was censured for failing to monitor Marshall's action.

Evans was demoted after the Tasman incident to chief officer of SS Southern Cross, but was later placed in command of SS Esk. In April 1886, Esk was stranded on the Hebe Reef near the entrance to the Tamar River. It was unable to be dislodged and broke up in a storm two weeks later. Evans was held responsible at a subsequent inquiry and had his certificate cancelled for "careless and reckless navigation". He was consequently dismissed by the Tasmanian Steam Navigation Company.

After his dismissal, Evans joined his father-in-law as partners in an ironmongery firm. He later returned to seafaring as master of SS Huon, a river and channel steamer. In 1891, Evans joined shipping company Huddart Parker as traffic manager. In the same year he was elected to the Hobart Marine Board, of which he later served as master warden. He was made manager of Huddart Parker's Hobart branch in 1894, a position he retained until his death.

== Political career ==
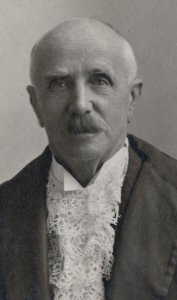
Evans as speaker of the House

Evans was elected to the Tasmanian House of Assembly at the 1897 general election, winning the seat of Kingborough. He would remain a member of parliament for over 40 years, moving to the multi-member seat of Franklin at the 1909 election. He eventually retired at the 1937 election, with his service remaining a record until surpassed by Michael Polley in 2012.

In 1901, Evans was appointed by the new federal government as one of the five judges in the 1901 Federal Flag Design Competition, which selected the national flag of Australia. He was chosen "for his experience and practical knowledge of flags" and after judging the competition in Melbourne had a copy made up for his return voyage to Tasmania, becoming one of the first people to fly the new flag.

Evans became leader of the opposition following state premier Elliott Lewis's defeat at the 1903 election. He was appointed premier on 11 July 1904 after William Propsting, Lewis's successor, had a finance bill rejected by the Legislative Council and was unable to obtain a dissolution from lieutenant-governor John Dodds.

In 1905, Evans also became state treasurer after the resignation of Charles Stewart. He formed government again after the 1906 election and appointed Propsting as attorney-general and leader of the government in the Legislative Council. Evans' government oversaw the introduction of free tuition in state schools and granted approval for James Hyndes Gillies to construct and operate the Great Lake Scheme of hydroelectric power. His government also legislated the Hare–Clark electoral system.

Evans resigned as premier on 19 June 1909, citing health reasons, and was replaced by Lewis. He later served multiple terms as speaker of the House of Assembly (1913–1914, 1916–1925 and 1928–1934) and was knighted in 1926. He was appointed lieutenant-governor of Tasmania in 1937, a position he held until his death.

== Personal life ==
In 1883, Evans married Emily Harcourt, the daughter of former Hobart mayor James Harcourt. The couple had two children.

Evans was widowed in 1941 and died in Hobart on 2 October 1943, aged 87.

Political offices
Preceded by William Propsting	Premier of Tasmania; 1904–1909	Succeeded by Elliott Lewis
