= Albert Solomon =

Australian lawyer and politician

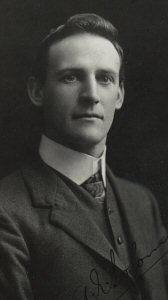

23rd Premier of Tasmania
- In office 14 June 1912 – 6 April 1914
- Governor: Sir Harry Barron (until 1913); Sir William Ellison-Macartney
- Preceded by: Sir Elliott Lewis
- Succeeded by: John Earle
- Constituency: Bass

Personal details
- Born: Albert Edgar Solomon; 7 March 1876 Longford, Tasmania
- Died: 5 October 1914 (aged 38) Hobart, Tasmania, Australia
- Party: Liberal
- Spouse: Elsie Scott (m. 1903)
- Profession: Lawyer

Albert Edgar Solomon (7 March 1876 – 5 October 1914) was an Australian lawyer and politician. He served as premier of Tasmania from 1912 to 1914, as leader of the Liberal Party. He died of tuberculosis a few months after leaving office as premier, at the age of 38.

== Early life ==
Solomon was born on 7 March 1876 in Longford, Tasmania. He was the tenth child born to Mary Anne (née Trebilcock) and Edward Solomon, who had moved to Longford in 1862. His father was a clerk and was active in the Northern Agricultural Society.

Solomon began his education at Longford State School before completing his secondary education at two private schools, Horton College and Launceston Church Grammar School. He passed his matriculation examination at the age of thirteen and completed the degrees of Bachelor of Arts (1895), Bachelor of Laws (1897) and Master of Laws (1903) at the University of Tasmania. He completed honours in history under William Jethro Brown, the first person to do so at the university.

Solomon began serving his articles of clerkship in 1893 with Law & Weston in Launceston. He was called to the bar in 1898 and went into partnership with his older brother Arthur. Their firm had offices in Launceston and Ulverstone.

== Politics ==
Solomon was elected to the Tasmanian House of Assembly at the 1909 state election.

Solomon secured the passage of the Cape Barren Island Reserve Act 1912, which formalised Cape Barren Island's status as a reserve for Aboriginal Tasmanians. In his second reading speech on the bill, he stated it was "an attempt to grapple with a very difficult problem" relating to "the remnants of the aboriginal population" who had been "allowed to run wild".

== Personal life ==
On 13 August 1903 Solomon married Una "Elsie" Scott, eldest daughter of Jabez Scott of Launceston. They had two sons.

== Sources ==
- Serle, Percival (1949). "Solomon, Albert Edgar". Dictionary of Australian Biography. Sydney: Angus & Robertson.
- "Solomon, Albert". Members of the Parliament of Tasmania.

Political offices
Preceded by Sir Neil Elliot Lewis	Premier of Tasmania; 1912–1914	Succeeded by John Earle
