= Elliott Lewis (politician) =

Australian politician

Sir Neil Elliott Lewis KCMG
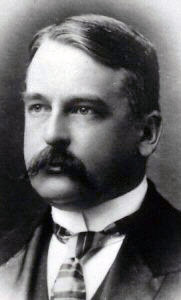

19th Premier of Tasmania
- In office 12 October 1899 – 9 April 1903
- Preceded by: Edward Braddon
- Succeeded by: William Propsting
- Constituency: Richmond
- In office 19 June 1909 – 9 October 1909
- Preceded by: John Evans
- Succeeded by: John Earle
- In office 27 October 1909 – 14 June 1912
- Preceded by: John Earle
- Succeeded by: Albert Solomon
- Constituency: Denison

Personal details
- Born: 27 October 1858 Hobart Town, Tasmania
- Died: 22 September 1935 (aged 76) Hobart, Tasmania, Australia
- Spouse: Lina Henrietta Youl
- Education: Balliol College, Oxford

Sir Neil Elliott Lewis KCMG (27 October 1858 – 22 September 1935), Australian politician, was Premier of Tasmania on three occasions. He was also a member of the first Australian federal ministry, led by Edmund Barton.

== Early life ==
Lewis was born in Hobart, son of Neil Lewis, a merchant, and his wife Anne Maria, née Cox. N. E. Lewis was the grandson of Richard Lewis (government auctioneer) and nephew of David Lewis, colonial treasurer 1878–79.

Educated at the Hobart High School, Lewis took the diploma of associate of arts with gold medal, and was awarded a Tasmanian scholarship. Lewis then attended Balliol College, Oxford University graduating B.A., 1882 and M.A. & B.C.L. in 1885. He was admitted as a barrister in London in 1883 and returned to Tasmania where he was admitted as a barrister in December 1885 and commenced a private practice.

== Political career ==
Lewis was elected to the Tasmanian House of Assembly at the 1886 election and remained a member of parliament until 1903. During this time he represented conservative interests and policies in opposition to liberals such as Philip Fysh, Sir Edward Braddon and Andrew Inglis Clark. He served in Henry Dobson's ministry from 1892 until 1894 as Attorney-General, and was Leader of the Opposition 1894–1899. He was also an ardent federalist, having accompanied his predecessor as Premier, Sir Edward Braddon, as part of the Tasmanian delegation to the 1897–1898 convention.

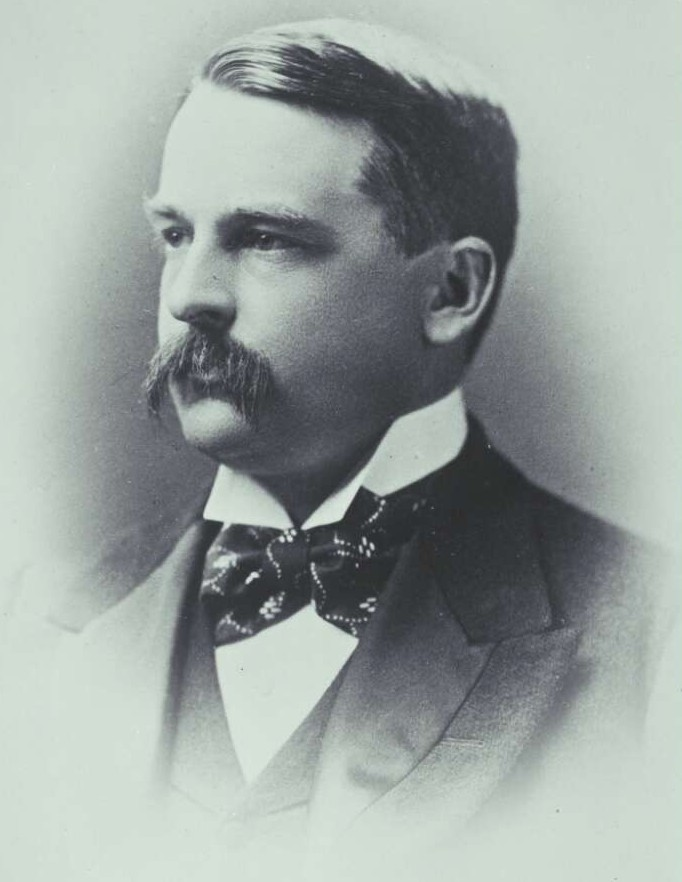
Lewis at the 1898 Australasian Federal Convention.

In early October 1899, following a number of scandals affecting members of his Ministry, Braddon lost a vote of confidence on the floor of Parliament and was obliged to resign, and Lewis became Premier of Tasmania on 12 October 1899. He served in this role until 1903, encouraging producing interests and endeavouring to find fresh markets. Lewis was appointed as Minister without Portfolio in the first federal ministry under Edmund Barton in January 1901. However, he decided not to stand for election to the Federal Parliament in March. Lewis and Sir James Dickson are the only people to have held ministerial office in an Australian federal government without ever being a member of the Commonwealth Parliament. Lewis was the last surviving member of the inaugural Barton Cabinet.

At the 1903 election, Lewis' seat of Richmond was abolished, and he failed to win the new seat of Central Hobart; the only time a Tasmanian premier has been defeated in a general election. Lewis failed in a second attempt in 1906, but won one of the Denison seats under the statewide Hare-Clark system at the 1909 election—ironic in light of his ardent opposition to the system. Lewis was to serve in Parliament for another 13 years.

Lewis was again Premier of Tasmania in 1909, and again from 1909 to 1912. During these times he also held the post of Attorney-General. After leaving politics in 1922, he became Lieutenant-Governor of Tasmania 1933–1935 and was the first president of the Tasmanian Amateur Athletic Association. Lewis was vice-chancellor of the University of Tasmania in 1903–1909 and chancellor in 1924–1933. By the time of his death in 1935 he was the last Dominion or self-governing colonial head of government of the Victorian era alive.

== Honours ==
Lewis was appointed a Companion of the Order of St Michael and St George (CMG) 15 May 1901, in preparation of the forthcoming royal visit of the Duke and Duchess of Cornwall and York (later King George V and Queen Mary). The following year he was knighted as a Knight Commander of the Order of St Michael and St George (KCMG).

== Family ==
He married, in 1896, Lina Henrietta Youl, daughter of Charles Youl, JP, and granddaughter of Sir James Arndell Youl, KCMG. They had two sons.

Political offices
Preceded by Edward Braddon	Premier of Tasmania; 1899–1903	Succeeded by William Propsting
Preceded by John Evans	Premier of Tasmania; 1909	Succeeded by John Earle
Preceded by John Earle	Premier of Tasmania; 1909–1912	Succeeded by Albert Solomon
