= John Earle (Australian politician) =

Australian politician (1865–1932)

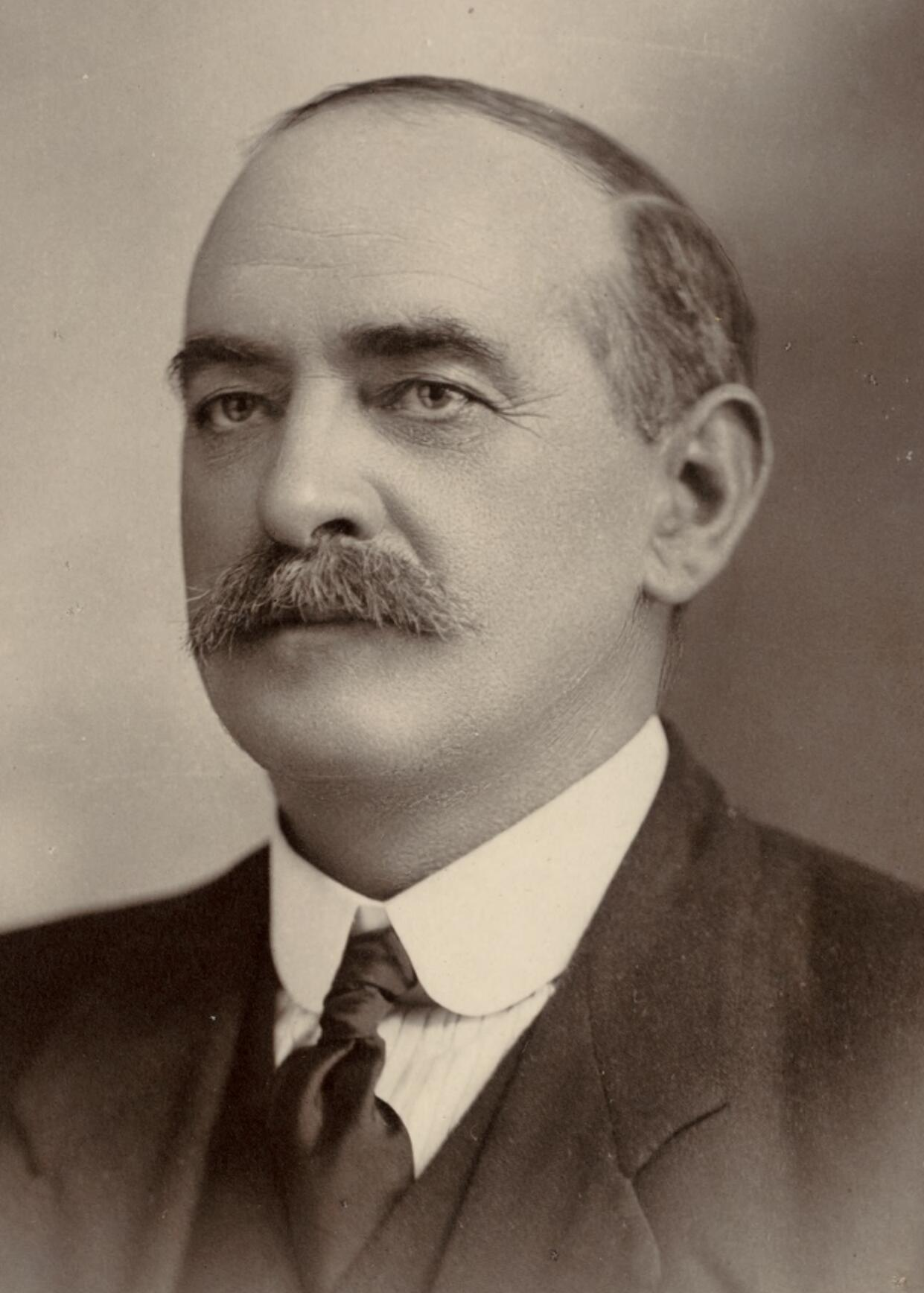

22nd Premier of Tasmania
- In office 6 April 1914 – 15 April 1916
- Preceded by: Albert Solomon
- Succeeded by: Walter Lee
- In office 20 October 1909 – 27 October 1909
- Preceded by: Elliott Lewis
- Succeeded by: Elliott Lewis

Leader of the Australian Labor Party in Tasmania
- In office 30 May 1906 – 2 November 1916
- Preceded by: New position
- Succeeded by: Joseph Lyons

Senator for Tasmania
- In office 1 March 1917 – 30 June 1923
- Preceded by: Rudolph Ready
- Succeeded by: James Ogden

Member of the Tasmanian House of Assembly
- In office 30 April 1909 – 1 March 1917
- Preceded by: New seat
- Succeeded by: Arthur Cotton
- Constituency: Franklin
- In office 29 March 1906 – 30 April 1909
- Preceded by: George Gilmore
- Succeeded by: Seat abolished
- Constituency: Waratah

Personal details
- Born: 15 November 1865 Bridgewater, Tasmania
- Died: 6 February 1932 (aged 66) Kettering, Tasmania, Australia
- Party: Labor (1903–1916); Nationalist (1916–1928); Independent (1928–1932)

John Earle (15 November 1865 – 6 February 1932) was an Australian politician who served as Premier of Tasmania from 1914 to 1916 and also for one week in October 1909. He later served as a Senator for Tasmania from 1917 to 1923. Prior to entering politics, he worked as a miner and prospector. He began his career in the Australian Labor Party (ALP), helping to establish a local branch of the party, and was Tasmania's first ALP premier. However, he was expelled from the party during the 1916 split and joined the Nationalists, whom he represented in the Senate.

== Early life ==
Earle was born on 15 November 1865 in Bridgewater, Tasmania, the son of Ann Teresa (née McShane) and Charles Staples Earle. His mother and father were of Irish and Cornish descent respectively. Earle grew up on his father's farm and attended the local state school. At the age of 14 he was apprenticed as a blacksmith at a foundry in Hobart. He attended engineering and science classes at the Hobart Technical School and also attended lectures at the Hobart Mechanics' Institute, as a result of which he developed an interest in politics. He was a member of the Hobart Debating Club and became acquainted with the colony's attorney-general Andrew Inglis Clark.

After completing his apprenticeship, Earle worked on the mines at Mathinna, Zeehan and Corinna. In 1893 he was a miners' representative at a government conference in Hobart. He returned to Zeehan in 1898 and became prominent in the local community, serving on the Zeehan Municipal Council, on the local hospital board, and as president of the Gormanston branch of the Amalgamated Miners' Association. He was one of 28 men blacklisted by the manager of the Mount Lyell Mining and Railway Company for being "disloyal and treacherous".

In 1901, Earle chaired the conference which established the Workers' Political League (WPL), the predecessor of the modern Australian Labor Party (Tasmanian Branch). He was elected as the organisation's inaugural president in 1903.

== Political career ==
=== State politics ===
Earle was defeated by three votes in the Tasmanian House of Assembly seat of Waratah at the 1903 state election. He reprised his candidacy in 1906 and was successful, subsequently being elected as leader of the parliamentary party. Following electoral reform, Earle was elected to the multi-member seat of Franklin at the 1909 election. He served Leader of the Opposition until 20 October 1909, when he formed a minority government of one week. He was the first premier of Tasmania from the ALP.

In 1914, Earle and the ALP formed another minority government after the defeat of Albert Solomon's government on a confidence motion. In addition to the premiership he also appointed himself attorney-general. In the House of Assembly the government relied on the vote of independent MP Joshua Whitsitt, and in the unreformed Legislative Council it had few supporters. Its accomplishments including the extension of public secondary education, the nationalisation of the Waddamana hydroelectricity scheme, and the establishment of the state's first national parks, Mount Field and Freycinet. Earle authorised large quantities of wheat to be imported in 1914 to alleviate a drought and "made large investments in public works to alleviate war-caused unemployment". During the early years of World War I he encouraged the unemployed to enlist in the military.

In November 1916, during the nationwide party split over conscription, he announced his resignation from the ALP in an open letter, stating that "the movement has been corrupted by bodies of extremists, irresponsible and in some cases distinctly disloyal men, aided and abetted by the weakness, cowardice, and treachery of the officers of the organisation and members of the Parliamentary party obtaining control of the movement". He resignation was widely regarded as pre-empted his expulsion.

=== Federal politics ===
In March 1917 Earle, who had by then joined the Nationalist Party of Australia, was elected by the Parliament of Tasmania to fill a vacancy in the Australian Senate. He retained his seat in the 1917 election. He became Vice-President of the Executive Council in the Hughes ministry from December 1921 to February 1923. He was defeated at the Senate election held in December 1922, and again in 1925, as a Nationalist candidate. In 1928 he stood as an independent candidate in Franklin, but was unsuccessful.

== Death ==
Earle died at Kettering, Tasmania, on 6 February 1932. He left a widow but no children. His cousin, Alicia O'Shea Petersen, would later follow Earle into politics as a prominent suffragist.

== Legacy ==
In 2009 Labor Prime Minister Kevin Rudd briefly noted the centenary of Earle forming Tasmania's first Labor government.

Political offices
Preceded by Elliott Lewis	Premier of Tasmania; 1909	Succeeded by Elliott Lewis
Preceded by Albert Solomon	Premier of Tasmania; 1914–1916	Succeeded by Sir Walter Lee
Preceded by Edward Russell	Vice-President of the Executive Council; 1921–1923	Succeeded by Llewellyn Atkinson
