= Houston (surname) =

Origin
- Meaning: Hugh's settlement
- Region of origin: Scotland

Houston is a surname of Scottish origin, from the place called Houston, Renfrewshire in the west central Lowlands of Scotland. In Old English, the name Houston meant the settlement belonging to Hugh.

== Demographics ==
=== Scotland ===
In 2025, Houston ranked as the 116th most common surname in Scotland’s birth, marriage and death registers, ranking 211th of data collected overall since 1975. According to the online genealogy portal Forebears, there were 4,477 Scots registered with the surname Houston in 2014.

=== United States ===
According to the 2020 United States Census, the surname Houston ranked as the 594th most common surname in the United States, with 55,138 individuals bearing the name.

In the 2020 U.S. Census, roughly 49.5% (27,268) of people with the surname Houston identified as White, while 40.5% (22,313) identified as Black or African American. Because Black Americans made up about 12.4% of the overall U.S. population in 2020, the surname is significantly more common among Black Americans than in the general population. Notable African Americans with the surname include civil rights pioneer Ulysses L. Houston, historian Drusilla Dunjee Houston, NAACP activist Charles Hamilton Houston, director Dianne Houston, and singers Cissy Houston, Thelma Houston, and Whitney Houston.

== People with the surname "Houston" include ==
=== A ===
- Alasdair Houston, English biologist
- Alexander Houston (1865–1933), Scottish policy expert
- Allan Houston (born 1971), American basketball player
- Amanda Houston (born 1980), British weather presenter
- Andrew Houston (disambiguation), multiple people
- Andy Houston (born 1970), American stock car racer
- Angus Houston (born 1947), Australian air marshal

=== B ===
- Barry Houston (born 1970), American professional wrestler
- Bill Houston (disambiguation), multiple people
- Bob Houston (1877–1954), Scottish footballer
- Bobbie Houston (born 1957), New Zealand-Australian pastor
- Bobby Houston (disambiguation), multiple people
- Brad Houston, American ice hockey coach
- Brian Houston (born 1954), New Zealand-Australian pastor
- Byron Houston (born 1969), American basketball player

=== C ===
- Charde Houston (born 1986), American basketball player
- Charles Houston (disambiguation), multiple people
- Cherylee Houston (born 1975), British actress
- Chris Houston (disambiguation), multiple people
- Christine Houston (born 1935), American writer
- Cisco Houston (1918–1961), American singer-songwriter
- Cissy Houston (1933–2024), American singer
- Clair Aubrey Huston, American stamp designer
- Clifford Wayne Houston (born 1949), American microbiologist
- Clint Houston (1946–2000), American bassist
- C. Stuart Houston (1927–2021), American-Canadian physician

=== D ===
- Dale Houston (1940–2007), American singer
- Dale Houston (tennis) (born 1961), Australian tennis player
- David Houston (disambiguation), multiple people
- Demerio Houston (born 1996), American football player
- Dennis Houston (born 1999), American football player
- Deryk Houston (born 1954), Canadian artist
- Dianne Houston (born 1954), American film director
- Dick Houston (1863–1921), Australian cricketer
- Donald Houston (1923–1991), Welsh actor
- Doug Houston (born 1943), Scottish footballer
- Drew Houston (born 1983), American internet entrepreneur
- Drusilla Dunjee Houston (1876–1941), American writer

=== E ===
- Eddrick Houston (born 2005), American football player
- Edward Houston (born 1937), American sprint canoer
- Edwin J. Houston (1847–1914), American businessman
- Elizabeth Booker Houston (born 1990), American political commentator
- Elsie Houston (1902–1943), Brazilian singer
- Eva Houston (born 2001), American Paralympic athlete

=== F ===
- Fitz Houston (born 1953), American actor
- Frances C. Houston (1867–1906), American painter
- Frank K. Houston (1881–1973), American businessman

=== G ===
- Garry Houston (born 1971), Welsh golfer
- Gavin Houston (born 1977), American actor
- George Houston (disambiguation), multiple people
- Glyn Houston (1925–2019), Welsh actor
- Gordon Houston (1916–1942), American baseball player
- G. David Houston (1880–1940), American professor
- Graham Houston (born 1960), British footballer
- Guy S. Houston (born 1961), American politician

=== H ===
- Harold Houston (born 1990), Bermudian sprinter
- Harold Houston (labor lawyer) (1872–1947), American labor lawyer
- Harry R. Houston (1878–1960), American politician
- Heather Houston (born 1959), Canadian curler
- Henry Houston (disambiguation), multiple people
- Herbert Sherman Houston (1866–1955), American businessman

=== J ===
- Jack Houston (1919–2008), Australian politician
- James Houston (disambiguation), multiple people
- Jameson Houston (born 1996), American football player
- Jamie Houston (born 1982), English-German rugby union footballer
- Jean Houston (born 1937), American author
- Jeanne Wakatsuki Houston (1934–2024), American writer
- Jennifer Houston (born 1971), Australian politician
- Jesse Houston (1909–1968), American baseball player
- J. Gorman Houston Jr. (1933–2024), American judge
- Jim Houston (1937–2018), American football player
- Jimmy Houston, American fisherman
- Joel Houston (born 1979), Australian musician
- John Houston (disambiguation), multiple people
- Johnny Houston (1889–1964), Irish footballer
- Jordan Houston (footballer) (born 2000), Scottish footballer
- Jordan Houston III (born 1975), American rapper and record producer
- Joshua Houston (1822–1902), American slave
- JP Houston, American singer-songwriter
- Justin Houston (born 1989), American football player

=== K ===
- Ken Houston (born 1944), American football player
- Ken Houston (ice hockey) (1953–2018), Canadian ice hockey player
- Kenneth Houston (born 1941), Irish rugby union footballer
- Kent Houston, New Zealand visual artist
- Kevin Houston (disambiguation), multiple people

=== L ===
- Lamarr Houston (born 1987), American football player
- Lambert Houston (born 1991), Chinese-American actor
- Lawrence R. Houston (1913–1995), American civil servant
- Leroy Houston (born 1986), Australian rugby union footballer
- Lin Houston (1921–1995), American football player
- Livingston W. Houston (1891–1977), American academic administrator
- Lock E. Houston (1814–1897), American politician
- Lorri Houston, American pioneer

=== M ===
- Marcus Houston (born 1981), American football player
- Marek Houston (born 2004), American baseball player
- Margaret Houston (disambiguation), multiple people
- Marguerite Houston (born 1981), Australian rower
- Marques Houston (born 1981), American singer
- Marty Houston (born 1968), American stock car racing driver
- Matt Houston (singer) (born 1977), French singer
- Michael Houston (disambiguation), multiple people
- Moira Houston (born 1961), English swimmer

=== N ===
- Neil Houston (born 1957), Canadian curler
- Nora Houston (1883–1942), American painter
- Norman Houston (disambiguation), multiple people

=== P ===
- Patrick Houston (disambiguation), multiple people
- Paul Houston (disambiguation), multiple people
- Paula Houston (born 1960), American prosecutor
- Penelope Houston (born 1958), American singer-songwriter
- Penelope Houston (film critic) (1927–2015), British film critic
- Penny Houston (born 1942), American politician
- Peter Houston (born 1958), Scottish footballer

=== R ===
- Reggie Houston (born 1947), American musician
- Renée Houston (1902–1980), Scottish actress
- Rich Houston (1945–1982), American football player
- Richard Houston (disambiguation), multiple people
- Robert Houston (disambiguation), multiple people
- Robin Houston (born 1947), British voice artist
- Roderick Houston (born 1962), American politician
- Russell Walker Houston, American politician

=== S ===
- Sam Houston (disambiguation), multiple people
- Scott Houston (disambiguation), multiple people
- Shine Louise Houston, American filmmaker
- Stephen D. Houston (born 1958), American anthropologist
- Sterling Houston (1945–2006), American playwright
- Stewart Houston (born 1949), Scottish football player and coach

=== T ===
- Tate Houston (1924–1974), American saxophonist
- Temple Lea Houston (1860–1905), American attorney and politician
- Thelma Houston (born 1946), American singer
- Tick Houston, American baseball player
- Tim Houston (born 1970), Canadian politician
- Tommy Houston (born 1945), American race car driver
- Tyler Houston (born 1971), American baseball player

=== U ===
- Ulysses L. Houston, American pastor

=== V ===
- Velina Hasu Houston (born 1957), American playwright
- Victor Houston (disambiguation), multiple people
- Victoria Houston, American writer

=== W ===
- Wade Houston (born 1944), American basketball coach
- Walt Houston (born 1932), American football player
- Walter Scott Houston (1912–1993), American astronomer
- Wanda Houston, American singer
- Whitney Houston (1963–2012), American singer and actress
- Will Houston (rugby referee) (born 1988), Australian rugby league referee
- William Houston (disambiguation), multiple people
- Wyatt Houston (born 1994), American football player

=== Z ===
- Zac Houston, American baseball player
- Zach Houston, American artist

== See also ==
- Huston (disambiguation), people with the given name "Huston"
- Governor Houston (disambiguation), a disambiguation page for Governors surnamed "Houston"
- Judge Houston (disambiguation), a disambiguation page for Judges surnamed "Houston"
- Justice Houston (disambiguation), a disambiguation page for Justices surnamed "Houston"
- Senator Houston (disambiguation), a disambiguation page for Senators surnamed "Houston"

== Sources ==
- Barrow, Geoffrey Wallis Steuart (2003), The kingdom of the Scots: government, church and society from the eleventh to the fourteenth century, Edinburgh University Press, pp. 319–320, ISBN 0-7486-1802-3. – via Google Books
- "Houston Surname Origin, Meaning & Last Name History". Forebears.
