= Members of the Tasmanian House of Assembly, 1906–1909 =

This is a list of members of the House of Assembly of the Australian state of Tasmania between the 29 March 1906 election and the 30 April 1909 election.

This proved to be the last term of single-member-district representation elected through first past the post, which had served the House for much of the half-century since the state's first elections in September 1856. Following the short-time use of Hare-Clark in the 1890s, in 1907 a redistribution adopted the five federal electorates that had been created for Tasmania as multi-member districts for state-level elections, and used the Hare-Clark proportional representation system to elect six members to each of the districts. The changes became effective at the 1909 election.

The 1906 election resulted in three more Labor members being elected—although one was replacing Labor-turned-Independent member William Lamerton. As most of the retiring or defeated members were Independents, this had little impact on the party balance and enabled John Evans to continue as Premier of Tasmania throughout the term.

Name	Party	Party (post-1909)	District	Years in office
Charles Allen	Liberal	Anti-Socialist	Westbury	1903–1909
William Bennett	Ministerial	Anti-Socialist	Cambria	1889–1893; 1903–1909
Jonathan Best	Independent	Anti-Socialist	Deloraine	1894–1897; 1899–1912; 1913
Stafford Bird	Ministerial	Anti-Socialist	South Hobart	1882–1903; 1904–1909
George Brettingham-Moore	Liberal	Liberal Democrat	West Hobart	1903–1909
William Brownell	Ministerial		Franklin	1903–1909
George Burns^{[2]}	Labor	Labor	Queenstown	1903–1906
Edward Crowther	Ministerial	Anti-Socialist	Queenborough	1878–1912
John Davies	Independent	Anti-Socialist	Fingal	1884–1913
John Earle	Labor	Labor	Waratah	1906–1917
John Evans	Ministerial	Anti-Socialist	Kingborough	1897–1937
Alexander Hean	Ministerial	Anti-Socialist	Sorell	1903–1913; 1916–1925
Thomas Hodgman	Ministerial	Anti-Socialist	Monmouth	1900–1912
John Hope	Ministerial	Anti-Socialist	Kentish	1900–1911
Charles Howroyd	Labor	Labor	North Launceston	1906–1917
William Jarvis	Liberal	Liberal Democrat	East Hobart	1906–1909
Jens Jensen	Labor	Labor	George Town	1903–1910; 1922–1925; 1928–1934
George Leatham^{[1]}	Ministerial	Anti-Socialist	New Norfolk	1891–1903; 1906–1909
James Long	Labor	Labor	Lyell	1903–1910
Sir John McCall	Liberal	Liberal Democrat	West Devon	1888–1893; 1901–1909
Charles Mackenzie	Ministerial	Anti-Socialist	Wellington	1886–1909
Richard McKenzie	Ministerial	Anti-Socialist	North Esk	1906–1913
Charles Metz	Ind Labor/Liberal	Liberal Democrat	West Launceston	1906–1909
Henry Murray	Liberal	Anti-Socialist	Latrobe	1891–1900; 1902–1909
Herbert Nicholls	Liberal	Liberal Democrat	Central Hobart	1900–1909
James Ogden	Labor	Labor	Zeehan	1906–1922
Christopher O'Reilly	Ministerial		Ringarooma	1871–1882; 1906–1909
Herbert Payne	Liberal	Anti-Socialist	Burnie	1903–1920
Frederick Rattle	Ministerial	Anti-Socialist	Glenorchy	1903–1912
Robert Sadler	Liberal	Liberal Democrat	Central Launceston	1900–1912; 1913–1922
Charles Stewart	Ministerial	Anti-Socialist	East Launceston	1903–1909
Don Urquhart	Liberal	Anti-Socialist	Devonport	1894–1903; 1906–1909
Benjamin Watkins^{[2]}	Labor	Labor	Queenstown	1906–1917; 1919–1922; 1925–1934
John Wood	Ministerial		Cumberland	1903–1909
Walter Woods	Labor	Labor	North Hobart	1906–1917; 1925–1931
Alfred Youl	Ministerial		Longford	1903–1909

== Notes ==
^{1} In May 1906, Ministerial member George Leatham resigned as part of an agreement to terminate a legal challenge from Julian Brown, the previous MP who Leatham had defeated at the election. Leatham won the resulting by-election on 25 June 1906.
^{2} On 1 November 1906, the Labor member for Queenstown, George Mason Burns, resigned. Labor candidate Benjamin Watkins was elected unopposed on 19 November 1906. At 22, he was the youngest member of the Parliament.

== Sources ==
- Hughes, Colin A.; Graham, B. D. (1976). Voting for the South Australian, Western Australian and Tasmanian Lower Houses, 1890-1964. Canberra: Australian National University. ISBN 0-7081-1334-6.
- Parliament of Tasmania (2006). The Parliament of Tasmania from 1856
- Newman, Terry, Hare-Clark in Tasmania -- Representation of all Opinions (1992)
