= Candidates of the 1909 Tasmanian state election =

The 1909 Tasmanian state election was held on 30 April 1909. This election saw the introduction of proportional representation in Tasmanian elections.

== Retiring Members ==
=== Anti-Socialist ===
- Charles Allen
- Stafford Bird
- William Brownell
- Charles Mackenzie
- Christopher O'Reilly
- Alfred Youl

=== Liberal Democrats ===
- Sir John McCall
- George Brettingham-Moore
- Herbert Nicholls

== House of Assembly ==
Sitting members are shown in bold text. Tickets that elected at least one MHA are highlighted in the relevant colour. Successful candidates are indicated by an asterisk (*).

=== Bass ===
Six seats were up for election.

Labour candidates	Anti-Socialist candidates	Liberal Democrat candidates
Michael Cullenan; Percy Evans; James Guy*; **Charles Howroyd***	Thomas Bakhap*; William Batchelor; George Grubb; **Richard McKenzie***; George Shields; Albert Solomon*; **Charles Stewart**	**Charles Metz**; **Robert Sadler***

=== Darwin ===
Six seats were up for election.

Labour candidates	Anti-Socialist candidates
James Belton*; James Hurst; **James Long***; **James Ogden***; Peter Riley; **Benjamin Watkins***	**Herbert Payne***; **Don Urquhart**; Joshua Whitsitt*

=== Denison ===
Six seats were up for election.

Labour candidates	Anti-Socialist candidates	Liberal Democrat candidates	Independent candidates
John Leary; William Sheridan*; John Smythe; **Walter Woods***	**Edward Crowther***; **Sir John Davies***; George Kerr; Sir Elliott Lewis*; **Frederick Rattle***; Joseph MacMaster	Thomas Amott; **William Jarvis**; Richard Meagher; George Smith	George Gilmore; Gilbert Rowntree (Ind Lab)

=== Franklin ===
Six seats were up for election.

Labour candidates	Anti-Socialist candidates	Liberal Democrat candidates
David Dicker*; **John Earle***; Joseph Hilton	**William Bennett**; **John Evans***; Norman Ewing*; **Alexander Hean***; **Thomas Hodgman***; **George Leatham**; **John Wood**	Lyndhurst Giblin; Theodore Lipscombe

=== Wilmot ===
Six seats were up for election.

Labour candidates	Anti-Socialist candidates	Liberal Democrat candidates
**Jens Jensen***; Martin Kean; Joseph Lyons*	**Jonathan Best***; Henry Dumbleton; Richard Field*; **John Hope***; Walter Lee*; **Henry Murray**	Newham Waterworth

== See also ==
- Members of the Tasmanian House of Assembly, 1906–1909
- Members of the Tasmanian House of Assembly, 1909–1912
