= Julian Brown (politician) =

Australian politician

Julian George Brown (24 February 1850 - 2 October 1925) was an Australian politician. He was a member of the Tasmanian House of Assembly from 1903 to 1906, representing the electorate of New Norfolk.

Brown was born in Hobart, later moving to New Norfolk to work for businessman Thomas Allwright. He then established his own successful general store and orchard there, operating it until his retirement. He was a member of the New Norfolk Municipal Council, a justice of the peace, chairman and treasurer of the road trust, and a trustee of the Methodist Church. He was also a co-founder of the New Norfolk Masonic and Oddfellows' Lodges, and was involved in the foundation of the Tasmanian Fruitgrowers' Association.

He was elected to the House of Assembly at the 1903 election, having been endorsed in his campaign by the Reform League. He defeated long-serving New Norfolk MP George Leatham, who he had previously unsuccessfully challenged in 1893 and 1900. He was defeated by Leatham at the 1906 election. Brown initiated a petition challenging the result in April 1906, which led to Leatham agreeing to resign and cause a by-election if Brown discontinued legal proceedings. Leatham then defeated Brown in the resulting by-election in June.

He was seriously injured in a coach accident on 18 December 1906. He suffered permanent damage to his ankle, and sued the proprietor of the coach line in the Supreme Court of Tasmania in late 1907, but was unsuccessful.

He returned to his business after leaving parliament, retiring some years before his death. He died at his home at New Norfolk in October 1925 and was buried at New Norfolk Cemetery.

He was married to Elizabeth Mary Brown; they had several children.
