= James Norton Smith =

Australian politician

Member of the Tasmanian House of Assembly for Wellington
- In office 2 March 1885 – July 1886
- Preceded by: William Giblin
- Succeeded by: Charles Fenton / Charles Mackenzie

Personal details
- Born: James William Norton Smith; 1846 Nailsworth, Gloucestershire
- Died: 12 January 1911 (aged 64–65) Flowerdale, Tasmania

James William Norton Smith (1846 – 12 January 1911) was an Australian politician.

Smith was born in Nailsworth in Gloucestershire in 1846. In 1885 he was elected to the Tasmanian House of Assembly, representing the seat of Wellington. He served until 1886. He died in 1911 in Flowerdale.

Tasmanian House of Assembly
Preceded by William Giblin	Member for Wellington; 1885–1886	Succeeded by Charles Fenton; Charles Mackenzie
