= Electoral results for the Division of Illawarra =

Election results for federal seat of Illawarra, New South Wales, Australia

This is a list of electoral results for the Division of Illawarra in Australian federal elections from the division's creation in 1901 until its abolition in 1922.

== Members ==
Member	Party	Term
George Fuller	Free Trade, Anti-Socialist	1901—1909
George Fuller	Liberal	1909—1913
George Burns	Labor	1913—1917
Hector Lamond	Nationalist	1917—1922

== Election results ==
=== Elections in the 1910s ===
==== 1919 ====
1919 Australian federal election: Illawarra
Party	Candidate	Votes	%	±%
Nationalist	Hector Lamond	15,419	50.6	−3.7
Labor	Bertie Sheiles	12,520	41.1	−4.6
Ind. Socialist Labor	George Burns	2,075	6.8	+6.8
Independent	Thomas Marshall	446	1.5	+1.5
Total formal votes		30,460	90.8	
Informal votes		4,080	9.2	
Turnout		33,540	71.8	
Two-party-preferred result
Nationalist	Hector Lamond		53.1	−1.2
Labor	Bertie Sheiles		46.9	+1.2
Nationalist hold		Swing	−1.2	

==== 1917 ====
1917 Australian federal election: Illawarra
Party	Candidate	Votes	%	±%
Nationalist	Hector Lamond	19,301	54.3	+8.5
Labor	George Burns	16,243	45.7	−8.5
Total formal votes		35,544	97.8	
Informal votes		802	2.2	
Turnout		36,346	75.7	
Nationalist gain from Labor		Swing	+8.5	

==== 1914 ====
1914 Australian federal election: Illawarra
Party	Candidate	Votes	%	±%
Labor	George Burns	17,884	54.2	+4.0
Liberal	George Fuller	15,096	45.8	−4.0
Total formal votes		32,980	98.9	
Informal votes		382	1.1	
Turnout		33,362	75.7	
Labor hold		Swing	+4.0	

==== 1913 ====
1913 Australian federal election: Illawarra
Party	Candidate	Votes	%	±%
Labor	George Burns	14,852	50.2	−2.7
Liberal	George Fuller	14,746	49.8	+2.7
Total formal votes		29,598	97.4	
Informal votes		794	2.6	
Turnout		30,392	77.7	
Labor hold		Swing	−2.7	

==== 1910 ====
1910 Australian federal election: Illawarra
Party	Candidate	Votes	%	±%
Liberal	George Fuller	9,763	52.0	−11.8
Labour	George Burns	9,025	48.0	+11.8
Total formal votes		18,788	98.9	
Informal votes		202	1.1	
Turnout		18,990	68.7	
Liberal hold		Swing	+8.5	

=== Elections in the 1900s ===
==== 1906 ====
1906 Australian federal election: Illawarra
Party	Candidate	Votes	%	±%
Anti-Socialist	George Fuller	9,726	63.8	−36.2
Labour	George Holt	5,528	36.2	+36.2
Total formal votes		15,254	96.9	
Informal votes		486	3.1	
Turnout		15,740	59.6	
Anti-Socialist hold		Swing	−36.2	

==== 1903 ====
1903 Australian federal election: Illawarra
Party	Candidate	Votes	%	±%
Free Trade	George Fuller	unopposed		
Free Trade hold		Swing		

==== 1901 ====
1901 Australian federal election: Illawarra
Party	Candidate	Votes	%	±%
Free Trade	George Fuller	5,788	56.9	+56.9
Protectionist	Alexander Hay	3,693	36.3	+36.3
Ind. Protectionist	Andrew Lysaght	689	6.8	+6.8
Total formal votes		10,170	98.2	
Informal votes		183	1.8	
Turnout		10,353	76.4	
Free Trade win		(new seat)		
