= St. Joseph Medical Center (Houston) =

- Steward Health Care

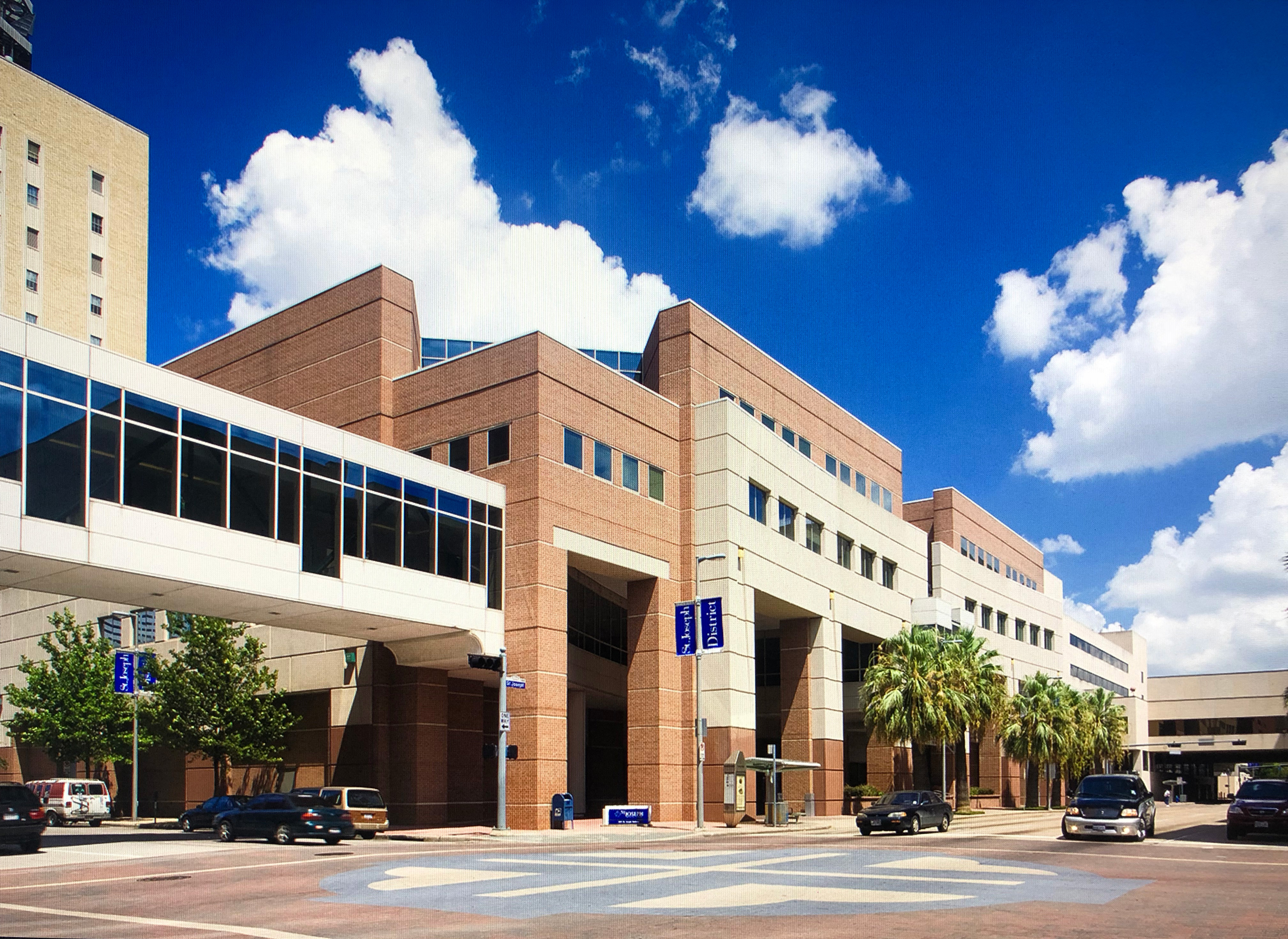
- St. Joseph Women's Medical Center (2014)

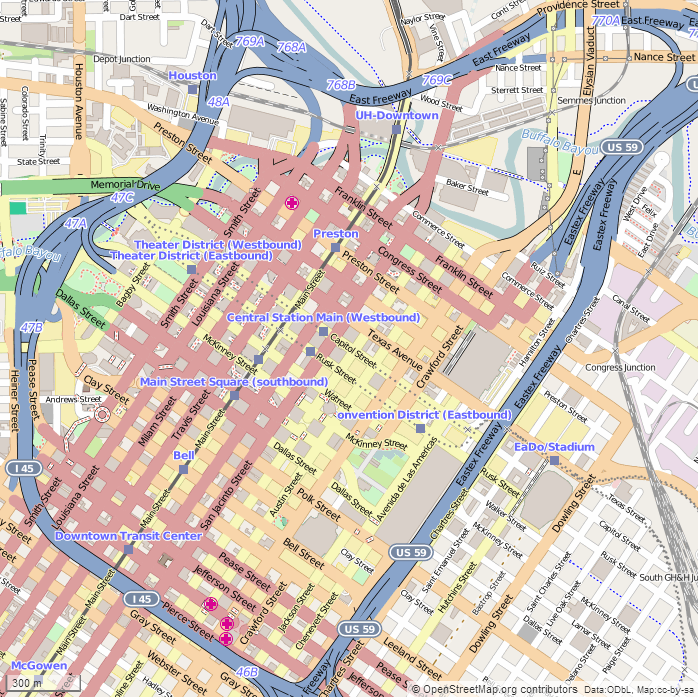
- Location within Downtown Houston

Geography
- Location: 1401 St. Joseph Parkway, Houston, Texas, United States
- Coordinates: 29°44′54″N 95°21′58″W

Organization
- Care system: For-profit
- Type: General acute care hospital
- Affiliated university: Steward Health Care

Services
- Emergency department: Downtown Campus Level III Trauma Center / Heights Campus Level IV Trauma Center
- Beds: 792

History
- Founded: 1887

Links
- Website: St. Joseph Medical Center
- Lists: Hospitals in Texas

St. Joseph Medical Center (SJMC) was a general acute care hospital in Houston, Texas owned by Steward Health Care. Established in June 1887, SJMC is recognized as the first hospital in Houston. A new hospital was constructed in 1894, but was destroyed by fire soon thereafter. The hospital was rebuilt and it underwent major expansions in 1905 and 1938. The hospital was the largest in the city until the Texas Medical Center was established. The hospital has a capacity of 792 beds. A second location was open in the Houston Heights from 2012 to 2019.

== Early history ==
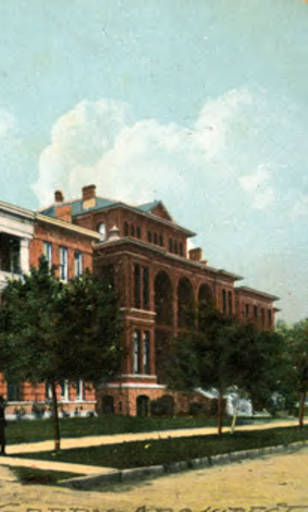
St. Joseph's Infirmary (1908)

St. Joseph's Infirmary was founded in 1887 by a Catholic order known as the Sisters of Charity of the Incarnate Word. The original building was an old frame structure at the corner of Caroline Street and Franklin Street. The year after it was established, the hospital entered into an agreement with the Harris County Commissioners Court to care for the city's indigent patients. The hospital earned a great deal of community support due to the care it provided to victims of an 1891 smallpox outbreak.

A new facility, larger and made of brick, opened in 1894. The facility was built by architect Nicholas J. Clayton, who also built numerous historic houses and major commercial buildings in Galveston and Houston. The hospital was destroyed a few months later by a fire that started at a nearby boarding house. The fire killed two of the sisters who belonged to the order. All of the patients were kept safe during the fire. A few months after the fire, a new building was completed after the order received monetary donations from Houstonians. The new hospital was located at the corner of Crawford Street and Pierce Street, which is now occupied by one of the hospital's buildings in Downtown Houston. At the time, the site was in a quiet residential area.

A new three-story brick structure was constructed in 1905. By 1919, St. Joseph was a 350-bed hospital that offered a range of medical and surgical services. The Bishop Byrne Annex was dedicated in 1919.

In 1920, an article in the Texas State Journal of Medicine mentioned that it had a strong nursing school and characterized the hospital as "an institution second to none in the south". In 1921, the hospital was listed as one of 12 Texas hospitals with over 100 beds that received Approved Hospital status following a site visit by the American College of Surgeons.

== Expansion: 1930s and 1940s ==
In 1938, a new maternity building was constructed in a $750,000 expansion (equivalent to $17,154,255 in 2013). The new construction was financially supported by the George W. Strake family, longtime donors to the hospital. A 1940 expansion added a new hospital wing and a new convent building. At one time, the hospital was known as "Houston's birthplace" because of the number of babies who were born there. After the 1947 Texas City disaster, the hospital received injured victims of the massive explosion. An account in the Annals of St. Joseph's Infirmary indicates that the hospital's emergency room treated more than 50 people injured in the disaster. St. Joseph remained the largest hospital in Houston until the establishment of the Texas Medical Center.

== 1950s and 1960s ==
In the 1950s and 1960s, a number of notable physicians practiced at St. Joseph. Mavis Kelsey, who later founded the multispecialty Kelsey-Seybold Clinic, was a member of the medical staff. The hospital's plastic surgery chief, Dr. Thomas Cronin, met with representatives from Dow Corning in 1961 to discuss alternatives to sponge implants for breast augmentation. Dr. Cronin and his plastic surgery resident Frank Gerow are credited with developing silicone gel implants during those meetings with the company. The Dow Corning Cronin Dacron breast implant was used in 88% of breast augmentation procedures by the early 1970s.

Before the establishment of Texas Children's Hospital in 1954, St. Joseph had a clinical affiliation with the Department of Pediatrics at Baylor College of Medicine. In 1950, St. Joseph pediatrician and Baylor professor Allan Penny Bloxsom introduced the Bloxsom air lock device for the delivery room resuscitation and oxygenation of distressed newborns. Bloxsom recognized that infants born by C-section more often required resuscitation. He theorized that uterine contractions (absent in many mothers who underwent C-section) helped to prepare a fetus for the task of breathing. His tube-like device created fluctuations in air pressure that simulated contractions of the uterus. The Bloxsom air lock device was utilized by over 700 hospitals by late 1952. Its use declined after a 1956 clinical trial showed that it did not improve outcomes over care in the standard incubator.

Herman A. Barnett, the first black medical school graduate at the University of Texas Medical Branch and the first black appointee to the Texas State Board of Medical Examiners, completed an anesthesiology residency at St. Joseph in 1968 and joined the hospital's medical staff.

== Recent history ==
Between 1995 and 1998, St. Joseph's number of outpatient visits increased from 69,644 to 137,239. In 1998, the hospital completed a three-year, $50 million expansion project, including a new pavilion chiefly designed for outpatient care. The hospital's parent organization became known as Christus Health in 1999 after the merger of the Sisters of Charity Healthcare System in Houston and the Incarnate Word Health System in San Antonio.

In the summer of 2005, Christus Health Gulf Coast announced that it was placing St. Joseph up for sale. The system said that it would endeavor to find a buyer that could continue to operate the hospital. Analysts, including one with Towers Perrin, questioned whether any hospital system would purchase the facility. They questioned whether the hospital could survive considering its large indigent patient population, the age of the facilities, the competition presented by Texas Medical Center hospitals and the cost of the real estate in downtown Houston.

In 2006, Christus Health Gulf Coast sold St. Joseph to Hospital Partners of America (HPA), a for-profit system that partnered with physicians to purchase and revitalize struggling hospitals. HPA renamed the hospital to St. Joseph Medical Center. Under HPA, physician investors held approximately 20% ownership of the hospital. In June 2008, HPA abruptly closed both locations of its other Houston hospital, River Oaks Medical Center. When the system closed River Oaks, that hospital owed creditors between $100 million and $500 million. HPA executives said that St. Joseph remained financially healthy and that there was no direct relationship between River Oaks and St. Joseph. In early July, HPA announced that it was placing all of its hospitals on the market.

In May 2011, Iasis Healthcare purchased the 79% of the hospital not owned by physician investors. At the time of the sale, St. Joseph had an enterprise value of $165 million and it generated $245 million in annual revenue. St. Joseph has been designated a Level III trauma center by the Texas Department of State Health Services.

From 2012 to 2019, St. Joseph operated a second hospital location at 1917 Ashland Street in the Houston Heights. The facility was located on the grounds of the former Heights Hospital. Health services had been offered on the grounds for much of the last several decades, but hospital acute and emergency services had not been offered at the location for nearly 20 years until St. Joseph opened there. The location closed due to low patient demand.

In August 2015, an unarmed patient experiencing a psychotic episode was shot by off-duty police officers providing security services at the hospital. The patient survived, but subsequent investigations uncovered patient rights violations and patient safety issues that jeopardized the hospital's funding from the Centers for Medicare & Medicaid Services (CMS). Later that year, CMS announced that it would no longer provide funding to the hospital. However, in January 2016, SJMC and CMS reached an agreement allowing the hospital to remain funded while certain deficiencies were addressed.

In November 2015, St. Joseph Medical Center opened two offsite cancer centers in affiliation with Integrated Oncology Network, LLC and its subsidiary Sightline Health, LLC (“ION”). The St. Joseph Cancer Center - Med Center is located near the Texas Medical Center at 9150 S. Main and the West Houston location is in the Westchase District at 2610 W. Sam Houston Parkway South.

In October 2017, the hospital changed ownership when Iasis Healthcare was acquired by Steward Health Care.

On May 5, 2024, The Wall Street Journal reported that Steward Health Care was expected to file for Chapter 11 bankruptcy protection within the coming days, blaming rising costs, insufficient revenue and cash crunches as part of the decision. Steward's bankruptcy is set to be one of the largest hospital bankruptcies in U.S. history, and the largest one in decades. The next day, Steward announced that it had indeed filed voluntarily for Chapter 11 bankruptcy protection. The company stressed that its hospitals and medical offices would remain open during the proceedings. In its press release, Steward stated it was finalizing terms of a $75 million in new debtor-in-possession financing from MPT, with the possibility for $225 million more if it meets certain unspecified conditions set by MPT. The company's filing papers list that more than 30 of its creditors owe about $500 million, and the U.S. government is owed $32 million to the federal government in "reimbursements for insurance overpayments".

== Notable births ==
- Jim Parsons known for his role as Sheldon Cooper on the television sitcom The Big Bang Theory was born there on March 24, 1973.

== Notable patients ==
- Lenwood Johnson (died May 2018)
