= Richard Houston (disambiguation) =

Richard or Rich Houston may refer to:

- Richard Houston (1721?–1775), Irish engraver
- Richard Houston (cricketer) (1863–1921), Australian cricketer
- Rich Houston (1945–1982), American football player
