= Matthew Robinson (Australian politician) =

Australian politician (c.1850–1928)

Matthew Edward Robinson (c. 1850 – 16 February 1928) was an Australian politician. He was a member of the Tasmanian House of Assembly from 1903 to 1906.

Robinson was born in Northallerton in Yorkshire. He moved to New Zealand when young, and worked in a softgoods warehouse until c. 1871, when he moved to Melbourne, Victoria, working as a warehouseman for Dodgshun and Co in Flinders Lane. He subsequently relocated to Tasmania to head the firm's Launceston branch, James Dodgshun and Sons, before opening his own warehousing business, M. E. Robinson & Co. Later in life he closed his warehousing firm and worked as a manufacturers' agent. He was a trustee of the Queen Victoria Hospital, Sunday school superintendent and warden of St John's Church and president of the Commercial Travellers' Association.

Robinson first attempted to enter state politics in April 1903, but was defeated for the seat of West Launceston by David Storrer. He won a by-election for West Launceston in October 1903 when Storrer resigned to enter federal politics. His platform included support for a unicameral parliament headed by the Lieutenant-Governor instead of a Speaker, reducing the salary of the Governor, a reduction of the number of ministers, amalgamating state departments, an independent board investigating any proposed expenditure, opposition to income tax and limited female suffrage for landowners only. He took a five-month trip abroad to the United States and Canada during his term. He was defeated in 1906.

He later served a three-year stint as a City of Launceston councillor from 1914. He died at his home in Launceston in 1928, aged 78.

Tasmanian House of Assembly
Preceded by David Storrer	Member for West Launceston; 1903–1906	Succeeded by Charles Metz
