= George Houston =

George Houston or Huston may refer to:

- George Houston (actor) (1896–1944), American B-western singer
- George Houston (painter) (1869–1947), Scottish oil and watercolour artist
- George R. Houston Jr. (1939–2008), American educationalist; president of Mount St. Mary's University
- George S. Houston (1811–1879), American Democratic politician; governor of Alabama 1874–78
- George Huston (politician) (1812–1890), Australian politician
- George Houston (singer) (2001-present), Irish singer-songwriter

== See also ==
- George Houston Burr (1881–1958), American architect
- George Houston House, 1860 American home listed on National Register of Historic Places in 1980
