= Charles Allen (Australian politician) =

Australian politician

Charles Winnett Allen (1833 - 25 October 1913) was an Australian politician. He was a member of the Tasmanian House of Assembly from 1903 until 1909, representing the electorate of Westbury.

Allen was born in Nova Scotia, the son of a British Army officer. His family moved to Van Diemen's Land (renamed Tasmania 16 years after they moved there) when he was seven years old. He initially trained as a carver and gilder, but later went to Victoria during the Victorian gold rush, in which he was successful in finding gold. He subsequently returned to Tasmania and purchased a farm at Cressy, where he spent seventeen years and developed a reputation as a successful breeder of sheep. He then purchased a number of adjoining properties consisting of 5000 acres near Westbury, where he lived for the remainder of his life. Allen was a staunch Anglican and a warden of his local church. He was a member of the Westbury Municipal Council and was the honorary secretary of the Westbury branch of the Reform League.

He was elected to the House of Assembly at the 1903 state election in opposition to the government of Elliott Lewis. His platform included abolishing income tax, limiting public works apart from roads to "back settlements", reducing state debt, and reducing the number of MPs. He supported the retention of the Legislative Council, pledged to oppose all taxation until "retrenchment had happened in all departments" and argued that free and compulsory education was unaffordable. Allen also suggested combining the offices of Governor and Chief Justice, turning Government House into a sanatorium, abolishing the office of Agent-General and reducing the size of the Supreme Court. In office, he was a supporter of the government of John Evans. He was re-elected at the 1906 election. After initial reports that he would retire at the 1909 election, Allen decided to contest the Legislative Council seat of Macquarie instead; however, he was unsuccessful.

Allen died at Westbury in October 1913, having been ill for some time. He was married to Mary Ann; she predeceased him in February 1908.
