= George Huston (politician) =

Australian politician

Member of the Tasmanian House of Assembly for New Norfolk
- In office 26 July 1886 – 18 December 1890
- Preceded by: Ebenezer Shoobridge
- Succeeded by: George Leatham

Personal details
- Born: George Francis Huston; 1812
- Died: 18 December 1890 (aged 77–78) New Norfolk, Tasmania

George Francis Huston (1812 – 18 December 1890) was an Australian politician.

Huston was born in 1812. He was a doctor before entering politics. In 1887 he was elected to the Tasmanian House of Assembly, representing the seat of New Norfolk. He served until his death in 1890.

Tasmanian House of Assembly
Preceded by Ebenezer Shoobridge	Member for New Norfolk; 1887–1890	Succeeded by George Leatham
