= Bloxsom air lock =

Neonatal incubator

- Other names: Positive-pressure oxygen air lock
- Specialty: Neonatology
- Uses: Respiratory distress in newborns
- Complications: Retinopathy of prematurity

The Bloxsom air lock was an incubator used in the treatment of respiratory distress among newly born infants in the 1950s. The device attempted to mimic the rhythm of uterine contractions, which were thought to have a role in stimulating fetal breathing. The device was developed by Dr. Allan Bloxsom, a pediatrician at St. Joseph Hospital and Baylor College of Medicine in Houston, Texas. At its peak, the device was utilized in more than 700 hospitals.

In 1956, six years after its introduction, the Bloxsom air lock produced unfavorable results in a clinical trial. By that time physicians had also become leery of the link between high-concentration oxygen and eye disease in premature babies, and the device fell out of favor. The Bloxsom air lock is sometimes cited as an example of technology that gained wide acceptance following inadequate evaluation.

== Development and acceptance ==
Allan Bloxsom was a pediatrician at St. Joseph Hospital and a faculty member at Baylor College of Medicine. In the early 1940s, he noted that babies born by cesarean section required resuscitation at birth more often than those born by vaginal delivery. Writing a 1942 article for The Journal of Pediatrics, Bloxsom hypothesized that the uterus played an important role in the initiation of breathing at birth. He thought that contractions of the uterus stimulated the fetal respiratory center, possibly by "the alternate forcing and drawing of blood from the fetal circulation by compressing the placenta." He also noted that uterine compression of the fetus, followed by the release of that pressure, might promote breathing in the baby born by vaginal delivery.

Bloxsom developed the air lock device based on his assumptions about the role of uterine contractions in establishing effective breathing at birth. The air lock was a sealed steel cylinder that delivered warmed and humidified 60% oxygen to newly born babies. The device has been compared to an iron lung, but it did not utilize negative pressure. The pressure inside the chamber alternated between 0.07 and 0.2 atmospheres above sea level. Rather than alternating the pressures at the rate of normal respirations as other devices did, the Bloxsom air lock cycled the pressure once per minute to mimic the rate of uterine contractions in late labor. Babies in distress were placed in the chamber immediately after delivery.

The device was rolled out in 1950. That year, Bloxsom presented a talk on the device at an American Medical Association conference. That led to the air lock being featured in Newsweek, which referred to the device as the "Plexiglass Mother". A Houston company developed a Plexiglass model. In 1952, U.S. Army physicians shared their experience with the device, writing that the air lock was a valuable resuscitation device and that on occasion it appeared to be lifesaving. Though the apparatus was large and loud, one pediatrician pointed out that the infant was protected from "meddlesome and unintelligent treatment" while locked inside the chamber. The air lock, which sold for about $1,000 per unit, was used in more than 700 hospitals by the fall of 1952.

== Decline ==
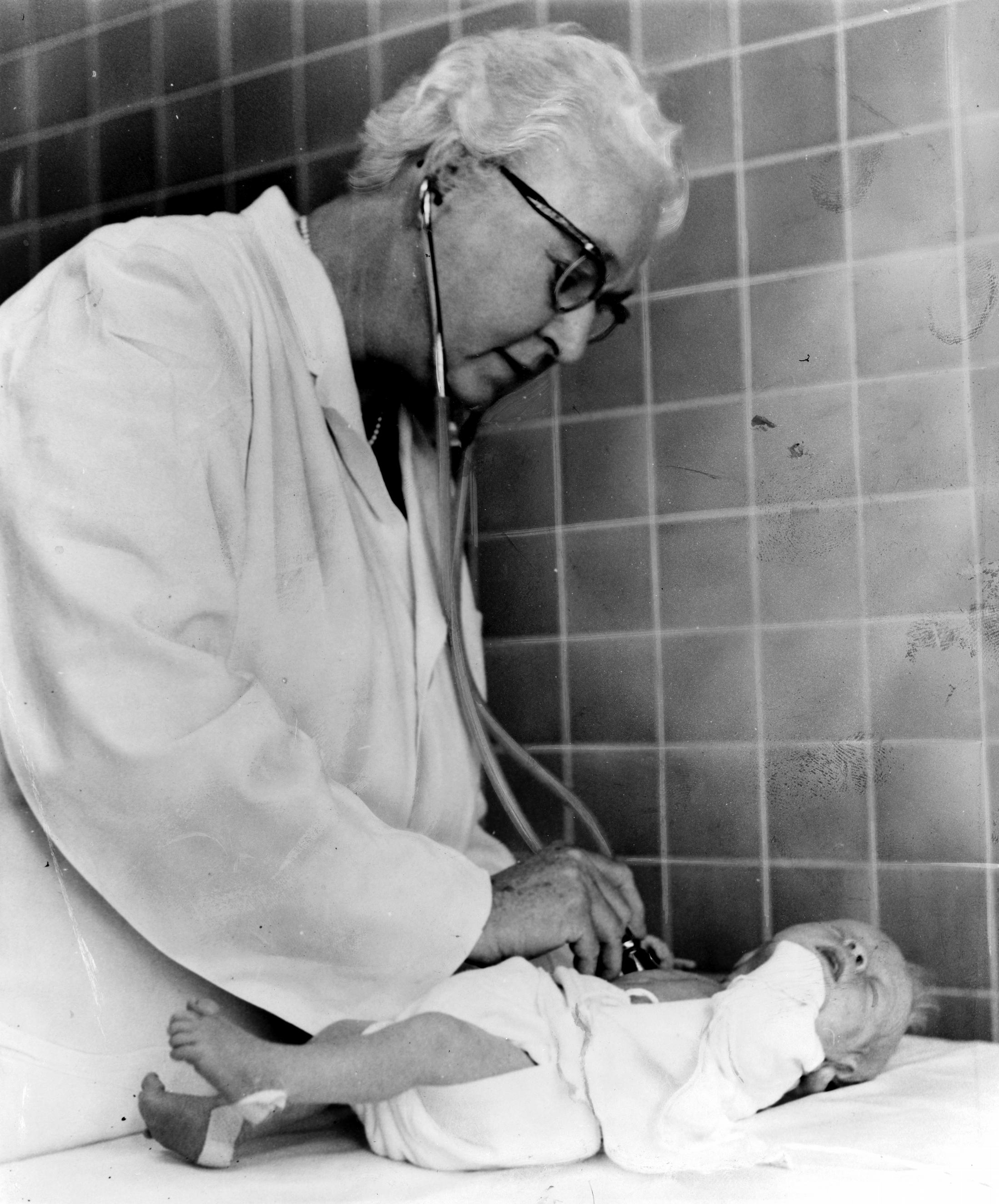
Dr. Virginia Apgar co-authored a 1953 study that was critical of the device.

In a 1951 article in The Medical Journal of Australia, pediatrician Kate Isabel Campbell advanced a theory that there was a link between oxygen administration and the occurrence of retinopathy of prematurity (ROP) in preterm infants. ROP had become an increasingly common cause of blindness among newborns. The next year, trials in Europe and the United States linked excessive oxygen and ROP more definitively, though an ideal level of oxygen administration was not clear and there was still no way to monitor an infant's arterial oxygen levels.

In 1953, Virginia Apgar and Joseph Kreiselman conducted a study in which they placed anesthesized dogs inside the chamber. They found that the device did not improve the exchange of carbon dioxide or oxygen in these dogs. Dr. Bloxsom and Sister Mary Angelique published a response to the criticism, pointing out that the device was never intended to help apneic dogs.

The next year, Bloxsom and Angelique published an article in the American Journal of Obstetrics and Gynecology on the 48-hour mortality rate among newborns at St. Joseph. Between 1949 and 1952, this rate had decreased from 63 per 10,000 infants to 37 per 10,000 infants. Bloxsom and Angelique cited the air lock device as a contributor to the improvement in outcomes. However, a 1956 study from Johns Hopkins Hospital failed to show a significant difference in outcomes between infants treated in the Bloxsom air lock versus those cared for in the Isolette brand of incubator.

Following the publication of the study at Johns Hopkins, and as physicians became aware of the link between high-concentration oxygen and eye disease in newborns, the device fell out of favor in the late 1950s. A small number of hospitals continued to utilize the device into the early 1970s. In 2001, Kending et al. wrote, "The Bloxsom AL device experienced a precipitous birth, a rapid acceptance and proliferation of usage, a rapid death, and now extinction." The authors noted that the device was seen as a status symbol by many hospitals, which led these centers to utilize it before it had undergone enough evaluation.

== See also ==
- Neonatal intensive care unit
- Mechanical ventilation
