= William Houston (disambiguation) =

William Houston (c. 1746–1788) was one of the Founding Fathers of the United States.

William Houston may also refer to:

- Sir William Houston, 1st Baronet (1766–1842), Governor of Gibraltar
- William Houston (actor) (born 1968), British actor
- William Houstoun (botanist) (1695–1733), Scottish surgeon and botanist
- William C. Houston (1852–1931), American politician and U.S. Representative from Tennessee
- William J. Houston (born 1968), American Navy officer
- William V. Houston (1900–1968), American physicist
- Will Houston (rugby union) (born 1988), Australian professional rugby union referee
- Bill Houston (American football) (born 1951), American football wide receiver
- Bill Houston (Australian footballer) (1918–1982), Australian rules footballer
- Bill Houston, singer/songwriter, see North of Superior

== See also ==
- William Houstoun (disambiguation)
