= Senator Huston =

Senator Huston may refer to:

- James N. Huston (1849–1927), Indiana State Senate
- Samuel B. Huston (1858–1920), Oregon State Senate

== See also ==
- Senator Houston (disambiguation)
