= David Houston =

David Houston may refer to:

- David Houston (1841–1906), American inventor issued the first patent for a roll film holder
- David F. Houston (1866–1940), American politician, Secretary of Agriculture and the Treasury under President Wilson
- G. David Houston (1880–1940), professor of English at Howard University
- David Houston (singer) (1935–1993), American country music singer
- David Houston (footballer) (born 1948), Scottish footballer and manager
- David Houston, British Army officer and Lord Lieutenant of Sutherland, 1992–2005
- David Houston (zoologist) (fl. 1999), British zoologist
