= Electoral district of Queenstown =

Electoral district of the Tasmanian House of Assembly (1903–1909)

The Electoral district of Queenstown was a single-member electoral district of the Tasmanian House of Assembly.

It was based in the mining town of Queenstown in the West Coast region of Tasmania. Created out of part of the Lyell seat ahead of the 1903 state election, it had historically been part of Montagu (1894–1900) and Electoral district of Cumberland (1856–1894).

The Queenstown seat was abolished when the Tasmanian parliament adopted the Hare-Clark electoral model in 1909. Its final member, Benjamin Watkins, who won a by-election on 19 November 1906 at the age of 22, successfully stood for the multi-member seat of Darwin (now known as Braddon) and retained political office for 25 years.

== Members for Queenstown ==
Member	Party	Term
George Burns	Labour	1903–1906
Benjamin Watkins	Labour	1906–1909
