= Division of Illawarra =

Former Australian federal electoral division

Illawarra Australian House of Representatives Division
- Created: 1901
- Abolished: 1922
- Namesake: Illawarra

The Division of Illawarra was an Australian Electoral Division in the state of New South Wales. It covered part of the Illawarra region, after which it was named. The Division was proclaimed in 1900, and was one of the original 75 divisions to be contested at the first Federal election. It was abolished at the redistribution of 13 September 1922, with the suburbs of Hurstville, Kogarah, and Rockdale being included in the new Division of Barton.

Its most notable member was George Fuller, who served as a minister under Alfred Deakin. After losing Illawarra to George Burns in 1913, Fuller would return to New South Wales Legislative Assembly, being elected to the seat of Wollondilly in 1915. Fuller would go on to become Premier of New South Wales on two non-consecutive occasions – in 1921, and then again from 1922 to 1925. Most notably, his first tenure as Premier lasted only seven hours on 20 December 1921 – by some distance the shortest serving ministry in Australian history.

== Members ==
Image	Member	Party	Term	Notes
	George Fuller (1861–1940)	Free Trade	30 March 1901 – 1906	Previously held the New South Wales Legislative Assembly seat of Kiama. Served as minister under Deakin. Lost seat. Later elected to the New South Wales Legislative Assembly seat of Wollondilly in 1915
	George Fuller (1861–1940)	Anti-Socialist	1906 – 26 May 1909	Previously held the New South Wales Legislative Assembly seat of Kiama. Served as minister under Deakin. Lost seat. Later elected to the New South Wales Legislative Assembly seat of Wollondilly in 1915
	George Fuller (1861–1940)	Liberal	26 May 1909 – 31 May 1913	Previously held the New South Wales Legislative Assembly seat of Kiama. Served as minister under Deakin. Lost seat. Later elected to the New South Wales Legislative Assembly seat of Wollondilly in 1915
	George Burns (1869–1932)	Labor	31 May 1913 – 5 May 1917	Previously held the Tasmanian House of Assembly seat of Queenstown. Lost seat
	Hector Lamond (1865–1947)	Nationalist	5 May 1917 – 16 December 1922	Failed to win the Division of Barton after Illawarra was abolished in 1922
