= Electoral district of East Launceston =

Former electoral district of the Tasmanian House of Assembly

The electoral district of East Launceston, sometimes referred to as Launceston East, was a single-member electoral district of the Tasmanian House of Assembly. It was based in the eastern suburbs of Launceston, Tasmania's second city, and the surrounding rural area.

The seat was created in a redistribution ahead of the 1903 state election, and was abolished when the Tasmanian parliament adopted the Hare-Clark electoral model in 1909. It had a single member during its existence, Charles Stewart.

== Members for East Launceston ==
Member	Term
Charles Stewart	1903–1909
