= Robert Houston =

Robert Houston may refer to:

- Robert Houston (actor) (born 1955), American actor and filmmaker from California
- Robert Houston (New Zealand politician) (1842–1912), Liberal Party Member of Parliament in New Zealand
- Robert Houston (photographer) (1935–2021), American photographer of the civil rights movement
- Robert G. Houston (1867–1946), American lawyer, publisher and politician
- Robert S. Houston (1820–1902), Wisconsin legislator
- Sir Robert Houston, 1st Baronet (1853–1926), British Conservative Party politician and shipowner
- Robert Louis Houston (1780–1862), British military officer in the service of the East India Company
- Robert Houston II (born 1980), professionally known as Black Pegasus, American rapper

== See also ==
- Bobby Houston (disambiguation)
