= Ebenezer Shoobridge =

Australian politician

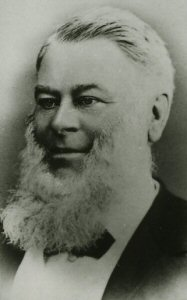

Member of the Tasmanian Parliament for electoral district of New Norfolk
- In office 27 May 1882 – 26 July 1886
- Preceded by: Alexander Riddoch
- Succeeded by: George Huston

Personal details
- Born: Ebenezer Shoobridge; 4 February 1820 Maidstone, Kent, England
- Died: 6 July 1901 (aged 81) New Norfolk, Tasmania, Australia
- Spouses: Charlotte Giblin (m. 1841; died 1879) Annie Paxton (nee Bruce) (m. 1880; died 1886) Louisa Caroline Collins-Harvey (m. 1886)

Ebenezer Shoobridge (1820–1901) was an Australian politician. He represented the Electoral district of New Norfolk in the Tasmanian House of Assembly from the 1882 election until he was defeated at the 1886 election.

Shoobridge was born at Maidstone, Kent, England in 1820. His father William Shoobridge moved his family to Van Diemen's Land in 1822, traveling on the Denmark Hill.

Shoobridge was married three times. He married Charlotte Giblin in 1841. She died in January 1879. He then married Annie Paxton (née Bruce) in July 1880. She died in April 1886 and he next married Louisa Caroline Collins-Harvey in August 1886.

Two of Shoobridge's sons later sat in the Tasmanian Parliament. William Shoobridge represented the Labor Party in Franklin and Wilmot in the House of Assembly. Louis Shoobridge Sr. was the independent member for Derwent in the Legislative Council.
