= Switch hit =

Modern cricket shot

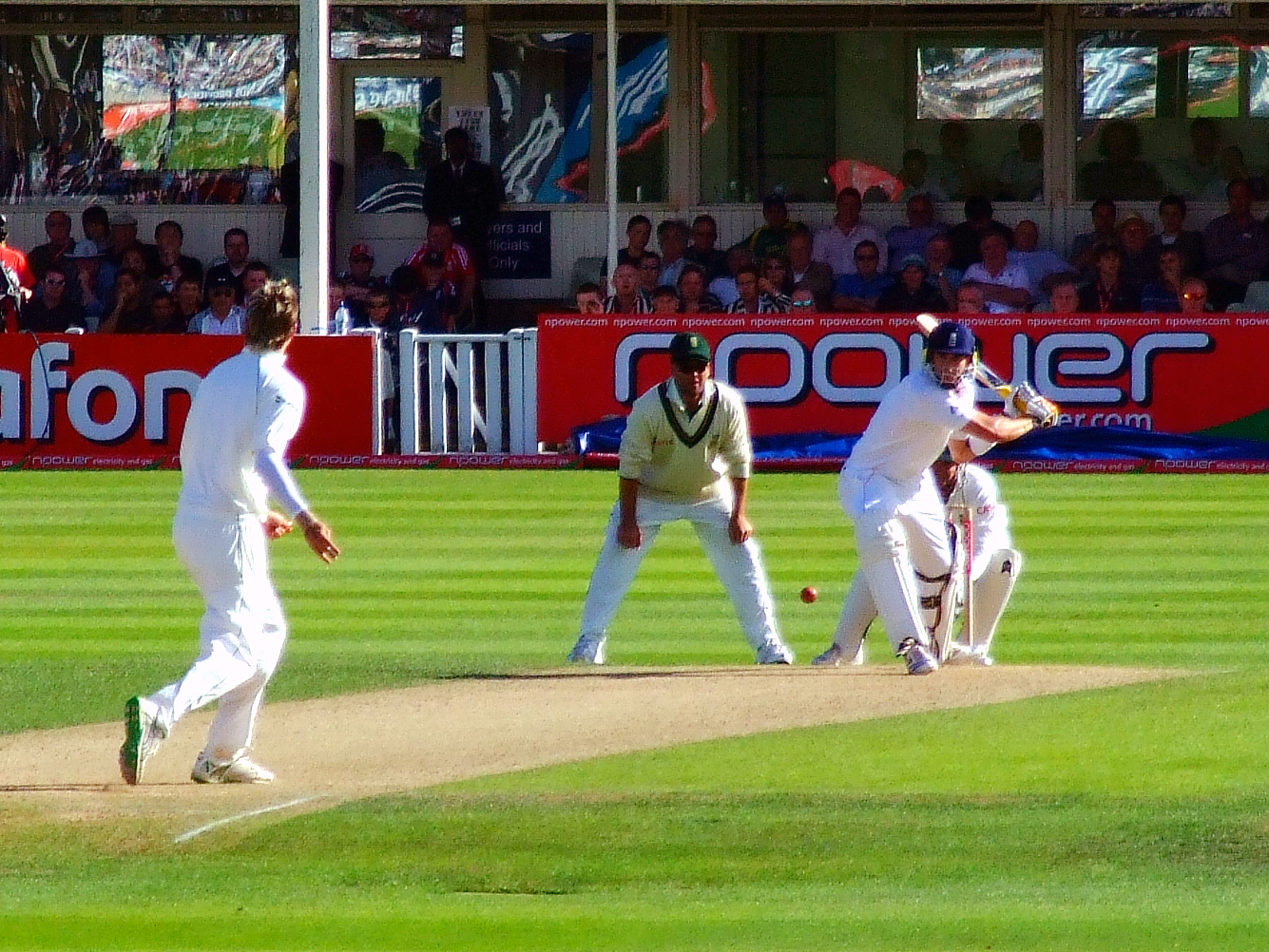
Kevin Pietersen about to play a switch hit during a Test against South Africa in 2008. Note how despite being a right-handed batsman, he has assumed the grip and stance of a left-handed batsman.

A switch hit is a modern cricket shot. A switch hit involves the batter effectively changing from a right-hander to a left-hander (or vice versa) just before the ball is delivered by the bowler for the purpose of executing the shot. It is a variation of the reverse sweep, in which the hands on the bat handle are switched and the stance is changed during the bowler's delivery action, and has been compared to switch-hitting in baseball.

== Early history ==
An early instance of a switch hit in Test matches happened in the fourth Test between Australia and England at Manchester in 1921. Australian captain Warwick Armstrong was bowling wide outside the leg stump to slow the scoring. To take advantage of the absence of fielders on the offside, Percy Fender switched his hands on the bat handle and played the ball towards cover point. The Times reported the shot thus:

in dealing with Mr. Armstrong, he [Fender] contrived at times to get away and place the ball on the deserted off side. He once shifted hands on the handle of the bat and pulled him back-handed across the wicket to the place where cover-point generally stands.

The Herald reported that the crowd laughed uproariously when Fender hit a "wide-pitched ball from Armstrong left-handed for two and converting a square cut into a square leg hit".

In 1924 the Marylebone Cricket Club (MCC) ruled that the shot was illegal and a batsman using it should be given out "obstructing the field". New Zealand authorities, on the other hand, saw nothing wrong with it, and noted that the rare instances when it had happened had amused the players and the spectators. Like Percy Fender, the New Zealand cricketer and clergyman Ernest Blamires had also used it to counter the leg theory bowling of Warwick Armstrong. In Australia, The Australasian described the MCC ruling as "so ridiculous that it leaves one in wonderment", and noted that the Victorian batsman of the 1890s Dick Houston had employed the shot frequently.

== Modern shot ==
In modern times, the shot is usually attributed to Kevin Pietersen. Pietersen played the shot in a Test match for the first time off Muttiah Muralitharan against Sri Lanka in May 2006, and used it again on 15 June 2008 in a one-day international against New Zealand. Despite the shot becoming known due to Pietersen's successful execution of it, it is believed that Jonty Rhodes actually executed this shot before Pietersen: he hit a switch-hit six off Darren Lehmann in a one-day international between Australia and South Africa on March 27, 2002. However, Krishnamachari Srikanth played a switch hit for four off Dipak Patel in India's last league match of the 1987 World Cup against New Zealand on 31 October 1987. Australia's Glenn Maxwell and England's Ben Stokes are notable users of this shot with the former being endorsed to use a double-faced bat in Twenty20 cricket.

The shot has generated debate in the cricket world, some heralding it as an outstanding display of skill and others arguing that if the batsman changes stance he gains an unfair advantage over the bowler, because the field is set based on the batsman's initial stance at the crease. The Marylebone Cricket Club (MCC), guardians of the laws of cricket, has confirmed it will not legislate against the switch shot and cited that the shot was perfectly legal in accordance with cricketing laws. The MCC believes that the stroke is exciting for the game of cricket, and highlighted Law 36.3 which defines the off side of the striker's wicket as being determined by his stance at the moment the bowler starts his run-up. The MCC has also acknowledged that the switch hit has implications on the interpretation of the 'on side' and 'off side' for the purposes of adjudicating on wides or leg before wicket decisions.

In June 2012, the International Cricket Council (ICC) committee declared it to be a legitimate shot. They issued a statement saying they have decided to make no change to the current regulations.

On the other hand, if defined by baseball equivalent, where a player change stance before even facing the ball, players that are able to bat both left handed and right handed straight up (notably David Warner) do not actually change handedness in the course of a turn at bat, but may appear in both handednesses during the course of a single game.

== See also ==
- Marillier shot
- Paddle scoop
