= Paul Huston =

Paul Huston may refer to:

- Prince Paul (producer) (Paul Edward Huston, born 1967), American record producer, disc jockey and recording artist
- Paul Huston (basketball) (1925–1992), American basketball player

== See also ==
- Paul Houston (disambiguation)
