= Electoral district of West Launceston =

Former electoral district of Tasmania

The electoral district of West Launceston, sometimes referred to as Launceston West, was a single-member electoral district of the Tasmanian House of Assembly. It was based in the western suburbs of Launceston, Tasmania's second city.

The seat was created in a redistribution ahead of the 1903 state election, and was abolished when the Tasmanian parliament adopted the Hare-Clark electoral model in 1909.

== Members for West Launceston ==
Member	Party	Term
Liberal	David Storrer	1903
Liberal	Matthew Robinson	1903–1906
Ind. Labor	Charles Metz	1906–1909
