= Electoral district of Wellington (Tasmania) =

Former Tasmanian House of Assembly electoral district

The Electoral district of Wellington was an electoral district of the Tasmanian House of Assembly. It was based in north-western Tasmania in the town of Stanley, and included King Island. The seat extended as far east as Wynyard and Burnie until 1903 when the Burnie seat was created.

The seat was created as a single-member seat ahead of the 1871 election from the western portion of the abolished Devon seat. In 1886, it became a two-member seat. At the 1897 election, Wellington returned to being a single-member seat when Waratah split away from it. It was abolished when the Tasmanian parliament adopted the Hare-Clark electoral model for the entire state in 1909.

== Members for Wellington ==
Single member: 1871–1886

| Member | Term |
|---|---|
| William Moore | 1871–1877 |
| William Giblin | 1877–1885 |
| James Norton Smith | 1885–1886 |

Two member: 1886–1897

| Member | Term | Member | Term |
|---|---|---|---|
| Charles Mackenzie | 1886–1897 | Charles Fenton (senior) | 1886–1897 |

Single-member: 1897–1909

| Member | Party | Term |
|---|---|---|
| Charles Mackenzie | Ministerial | 1897–1909 |
