= Clifford Wayne Houston =

African-American microbiologist

Clifford Wayne Houston (born December 3, 1949) is a microbiologist, educator, and the first African American president of the American Society of Microbiology. Presently, he is a Herman Barnett Distinguished Professor as well as the Associate Vice President for Educational Outreach and Diversity for the University of Texas Medical Branch (UTMB).

== Early life and education ==
=== Childhood ===
Clifford Wayne Houston was born to Mae Francis Hanley and Edgar Houston on December 3, 1949 in Oklahoma City, Oklahoma. The elementary school he attended was Gordan Oaks Elementary and his junior high school was John F. Kennedy Junior High School. As an adolescent, Houston attended a science seminar, which became the basis for his interest in science. He attained multiple high honors at Douglass and Northeast High School before graduating in 1968.

=== College ===
After graduating from high school, Clifford enrolled in Oklahoma State University in 1968, and while in college he was a part of the Alpha Phi Alpha fraternity. He received his Bachelor of Science in both biology and chemistry in 1972 and an M.Sc. in biology in 1974. In 1979, Houston received his PhD in microbiology and immunology at the University of Oklahoma Health Sciences Center. After graduating, Houston was awarded by the UTMB with a postdoctoral fellowship.

== Career ==
=== UTMB ===
In 1981, Houston started as an assistant researcher at UTMB. Afterward, in 1987, he got a promotion to become an associate professor with tenure. In this position, one of the things he researched was how a rat's behavior would change when its adrenal gland was removed. In 1991, he became a full professor at UTMB. In the same year, he was appointed as the associate vice president at the Office for Educational Outreach and Diversity at UTMB. His research at UTMB was focused on how bacterial toxins affect the way diseases develop in a person. An example of this is his research to develop a test to detect the presence of salmonella toxins. Much of his findings during this time were published in academic journals such as the Journal of Clinical Microbiology, Journal of Infectious Diseases, and Journal of Bacteriology.

=== NASA ===
In 2003-2005, Houston served as the Deputy Associate Administrator for Education at NASA's Office of Education. His main role at this position was to give help to people of all education levels and types.

=== American Society of Microbiology ===
In 2006, Houston was elected as the first black president of the ASM, the world's largest professional biological research organization with over 45,000 members. During his tenure as president, the organization made greater efforts to attract the attention of minority participants.

=== Other ===
In 1994, Houston took part as an administrator in the Harvard Management Development Program. Houston served as a chair for the ABRCMS Steering and Planning Committee. In 1997, he was elected to the American Academy of Microbiology. He was on the National Institutes of General Medical Sciences External Advisory Council. Houston was the chair of the Annual Biomedical Research Conference for Minority Students. Kathleen Sebelius, the U.S. Secretary of Health and Human Services at the time, appointed him to the National Advisory Board for Bio Security in 2011.

== Accolades ==
Houston was named a Herman Barnett Distinguished Professor of Microbiology and Immunology and the Academy of Microbiology elected him in 1997. In 2000, he received the Presidential Award in Science, Mathematics and Engineering Mentoring. In 2007, Houston became the first black person elected as the president of the American Society of Microbiologists.

== Personal life ==
He lives in Galveston with his wife and son while continuing to mentor youth in STEM in the community.
