= James Houston =

James or Jim Houston may refer to:

== Sportspeople ==
- James Houston (rugby league) (born 1982), Scottish rugby league player
- Jim Houston (James Edward Houston, 1937–2018), American football linebacker
- James Houston (American football) (born 1998), American football player

== Other people ==
- James Houston (judge) (1767–1819), Maryland federal judge
- James Archibald Houston (1921–2005), Canadian author and artist
- James D. Houston (1933–2009), American novelist
- James M. Houston (1922–2026), Canadian theologian
- Jimmy Houston (born 1944), American pro angler and television host
- J. Gorman Houston Jr. (1933–2024), American jurist from Alabama
