= Andrew Houston (disambiguation) =

Andrew Houston is the name of:

- Andrew Houston (born 1846, date of death unknown), Irishman known as the Rossendale Bard
- Andrew Jackson Houston (1854–1941), American politician
- Andy Houston, NASCAR driver
