= Paul Houston =

Paul Houston may refer to:

- Paul Houston (chemist) (born 1947), professor of chemistry
- Paul R. Houston (born 1979), American federal law enforcement officer

== See also ==
- Paul Huston (disambiguation)
