= Paula Houston =

American state official

Paula Houston (born 1960) was Utah's Obscenity and Pornography Complaints Ombudsman or "porn czar" from 2001 to 2003. Before rising to her post, she was a prosecutor.

Houston grew up in Columbia Falls, Montana, and graduated from Brigham Young University (BYU). She served as a Mormon missionary in New Zealand and has a law degree from BYU.

Houston worked as city prosecutor for West Valley City, Utah for 15 years.

The role of the Obscenity and Pornography Complaints Ombudsman was to provide resources for residents attempting to curb the unwelcome presence of pornography in their neighbourhoods and on the Internet. Houston came under fire on several fronts during her brief tenure. Critics doubted she could remain objective and fair in regard to pornography, given the fact that she was a member of the Church of Jesus Christ of Latter-day Saints, which opposes pornography. The American Civil Liberties Union opposed the creation of such a position, describing it as unnecessary given existing laws and feared Houston might violate due process, and First Amendment Rights.

One of the key duties of this position was developing a model ordinance for local community standards on sexually explicit businesses.

The position was part of the attorney general's office and in its creation, the annual budget for the "porn czar" was $150,000. When the Attorney General's office had to cut $750,000 from its budget, Houston's job was made redundant.

Houston later would be deputy city prosecutor for St. George, Utah.
