= Justice Houston =

Justice Houston may refer to:

- Eli Huston (Houston, in some sources; c. 1799–1835), associate justice of the Supreme Court of Mississippi
- J. Gorman Houston Jr. (1933–2024), associate justice of the Supreme Court of Alabama

== See also ==
- Joseph W. Huston (1833–1905), associate justice and chief justice of the Idaho Supreme Court
- Judge Houston (disambiguation)
