= George Houston House =

Historic house in North Carolina, United States

- U.S. National Register of Historic Places
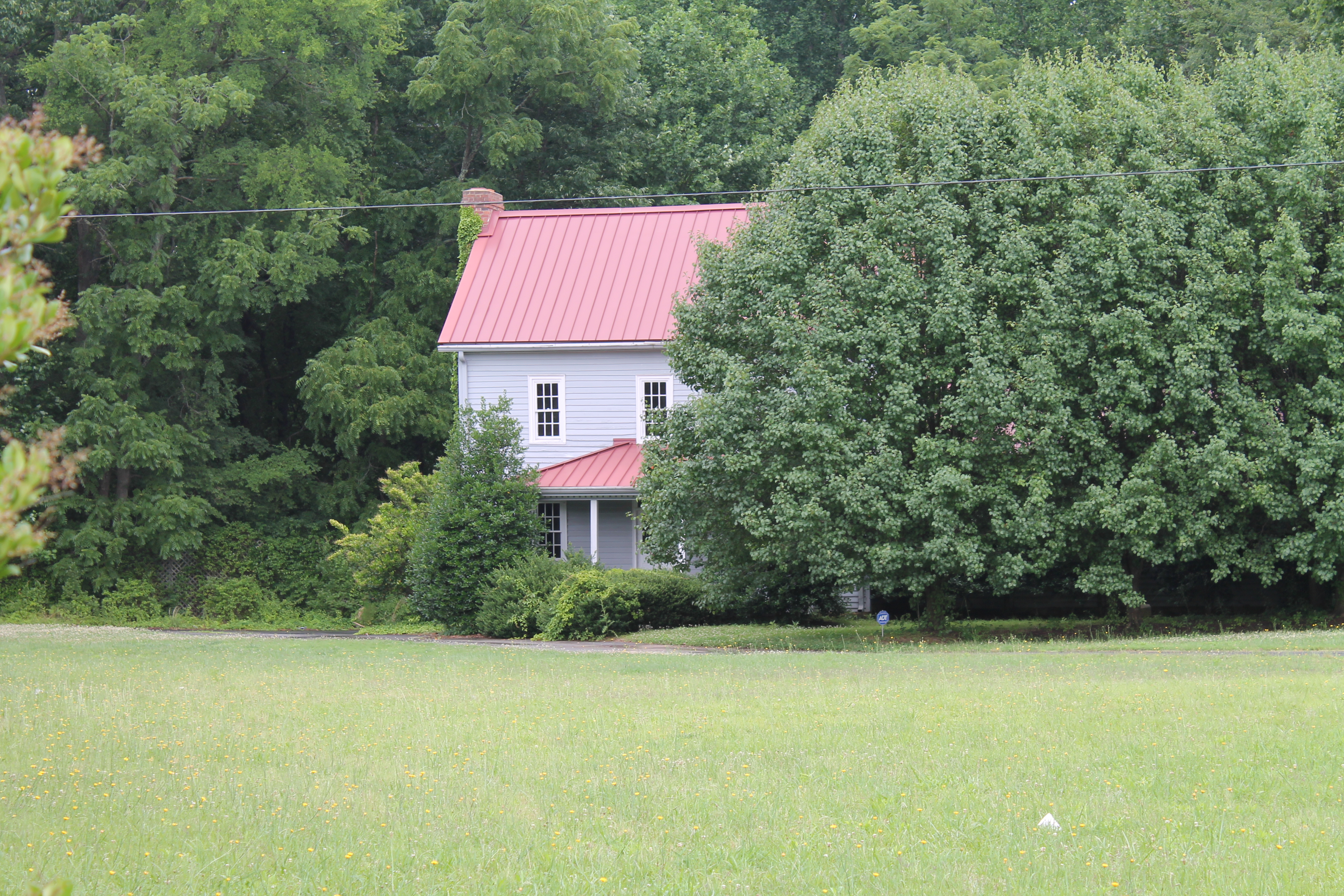
- A view of the George Houston House from N.C. Highway 115

- Location within North Carolina Location within the United States
- Location: NC 115, near Mooresville, North Carolina
- Coordinates: 35°31′34″N 80°50′30″W
- Area: 31.5 acres (12.7 ha)
- Built: 1818
- Architectural style: Federal, Early Federal
- MPS: Iredell County MRA
- NRHP reference No.: 80002865
- Added to NRHP: November 24, 1980

The George Houston House, also known as the "Wall-Houston House", is a private historic home between Mooresville and Davidson, North Carolina in Iredell County that was built in 1818. The original portion of the home was built with log construction, and several later additions, including a 19th-century ell. In its nomination, the home's original Federal-style construction was noted as being highly representative of the idiosyncrasies found in home designs in Iredell County and the North Carolina Piedmont during the Federal era. The property on which the home sits also contains several historic outbuildings, including an early log barn.

It was listed on the National Register of Historic Places in 1980.

== See also ==
- "Guide to the Preservation North Carolina Historic Architecture Slide Collection, 1965-2005". North Carolina State University Libraries' Digital Collections. North Carolina State University Libraries. – A collection containing photographic slides documenting the house.
- "Buildings: Houston, George House (Walls-Houston House)". North Carolina State University Libraries' Digital Collections. Preservation North Carolina. – Archival website containing digitized versions of images of the home in various stages of disrepair and restoration.
