= Scott Houston =

Scott Houston may refer to:

- Scott Houston (musician), piano player, author, teacher and television personality
- Scott Houston (athlete) (born 1990), American pole vaulter
