= Michael Houston =

Michael or Mike Houston may refer to:

- Michael Houston (football manager), Irish Gaelic football manager
- J. Michael Houston (born 1944), mayor of Springfield, Illinois
- Mike Houston (American football) (born 1971), American college football coach
- Mike Houston (actor), American actor

== See also ==
- Michael Houstoun (born 1952), New Zealand concert pianist
