= Russell Walker Houston =

American politician

Russell Walker Houston was a state legislator in Mississippi. He represented Issaquena County and Washington County, Mississippi in the Mississippi House of Representatives in 1872 and 1873.

He was born in Tennessee. He died in California.

== See also ==
- African American officeholders from the end of the Civil War until before 1900
