= Chris Houston =

Chris Houston may refer to:

- Chris Houston (American football) (born 1984), American football cornerback
- Chris Houston (musician), Canadian musician
- Chris Houston (rugby league) (born 1985), who as of 2017 plays for Widnes Vikings
