= Kevin Houston =

Kevin Houston may refer to:

- Kevin Houston (basketball)
- Kevin Houston (mathematician)
