= Bobby Houston =

Bobby Houston may refer to:

- Bobby Houston (American football) (born 1967), American football linebacker
- Bobby Houston (footballer, died 1915), Scottish football goalkeeper
- Bobby Houston (footballer, born 1952), Scottish footballer

== See also ==
- Bob Houston (1877–1954), Scottish footballer with St Bernard's, Hearts, Tottenham
