= Electoral district of New Norfolk =

Former electoral district of the Tasmanian House of Assembly

New Norfolk Tasmania—House of Assembly
- State: Tasmania
- Created: 1856
- Abolished: 1909

The Electoral district of New Norfolk was a single-member electoral district of the Tasmanian House of Assembly. Its population centre was the town of New Norfolk, northwest of the Tasmanian capital, Hobart.

The seat was created ahead of the Assembly's first election held in 1856, and was abolished when the Tasmanian parliament adopted the Hare-Clark electoral model in 1909.

== Members for New Norfolk ==
Member	Term
Michael Fenton	1856–1861
William Sharland	1861–1872
Alexander Riddoch	1872–1882
Ebenezer Shoobridge	1882–1886
George Huston	1886–1891
George Leatham	1891–1903
Julian Brown	1903–1906
George Leatham	1906–1909
