= Norman Houston =

Norman Houston is the name of:

- Norman O. Houston, American businessman
- Norman Houston (screenwriter), American screenwriter
