= Electoral district of Burnie =

Tasmanian colonial electoral district

The electoral district of Burnie was a single-member electoral district of the Tasmanian House of Assembly. It centred on the town of Burnie on Tasmania's northern coast.

The seat was created in a redistribution ahead of the 1903 state election from parts of Waratah and West Devon, and was abolished when the Tasmanian parliament adopted the Hare-Clark electoral model in 1909. It had a single member during its existence, Herbert Payne.

== Members for Burnie ==
Member	Term
Herbert Payne	1903–1909
