= Governor Houston =

Governor Houston may refer to:

- George S. Houston (1811–1879), 24th Governor of Alabama
- Sam Houston (1793–1863), 6th Governor of Tennessee, 7th Governor of Texas
- Sir William Houston, 1st Baronet (1766–1842), Acting Governor of Gibraltar from 1831 to 1835

== See also ==
- John Houstoun (1744–1796), Governor of Georgia from 1778 to 1779
