= Henry Houston =

Henry Houston may refer to:

- Henry A. Houston (1847–1925), American teacher, businessman and politician
- Henry H. Houston (1820–1895), American businessman and philanthropist
