= Senator Houston =

Senator Houston may refer to:

- Andrew Jackson Houston (1854–1941), U.S. Senator from Texas in 1941
- George S. Houston (1811–1879), U.S. Senator from Alabama in 1879
- Sam Houston (1793–1863), U.S. Senator from Texas from 1846 to 1859
- Temple Lea Houston (1860–1905), Texas State Senate

== See also ==
- Senator Huston (disambiguation)
