= Charles Houston =

Charles Houston is the name of:

- Charles Hamilton Houston (1895–1950), American civil rights lawyer and educator
- Charles Snead Houston (1913–2009), American mountaineer, physician, scientist, and Peace Corps worker
- Charles Houston (actor) (1931–2006), British actor in The Valiant (1962 film)
