= Victoria Houston =

American writer

- Born: March 25, 1945 (age 81); Rhinelander, Wisconsin, U.S.
- Occupation: Novelist

Victoria Houston is an American writer. She is the author of the Loon Lake Series, a series of murder mysteries. The mysteries are set in the Northwoods of Wisconsin against a background of fly fishing as well as fishing for muskie, bass, bluegill and walleyes. She has also written or co-authored over seven non-fiction books. Houston had been formerly married to a man nine years younger than herself, and their union led Houston to interview 40 couples in similar circumstances, resulting in the book Loving a Younger Man: How Women Are Finding and Enjoying a Better Relationship. Houston lives and works in Rhinelander, Wisconsin.

== Bibliography ==
Loon Lake Fishing Mystery

  - Dead Big Dawg (2019)
  - Dead Firefly (2018)
  - Dead Spider (2017)
  - Dead Loudmouth (2016)
  - Dead Rapunzel (2015)
  - Dead Lil' Hustler (2014)
  - Dead Insider (2013) ISBN 9781440533563
  - Dead Tease (2012) ISBN 9781440533112
  - Dead Deceiver (2011) ISBN 9781440582226
  - Dead Renegade (2009) Bleak House Books ISBN 9781606480625
  - Dead Hot Shot (2008) Bleak House Books ISBN 9781932557749
  - Dead Madonna (2007) ISBN 9781440550881
  - Dead Boogie (2006) ISBN 9781440582202
  - Dead Jitterbug (2005) ISBN 9781440582264
  - Dead Hot Mama (2004) ISBN 9780425193327
  - Dead Frenzy (2003)
  - Dead Water (2001) ISBN 9780425180037
  - Dead Creek (2000) ISBN 9781440582219
  - Dead Angler (2000)

Lew Ferris Mystery

- The Wolves are Watching (2026) ISBN 979-8892424288
- At the Edge of the Woods (2024) ISBN 978-1639106547
- Wolf Hollow (2022) ISBN 9781643858005
- Hidden in the Pines (2023) ISBN 9781639101474

Other Works

- Loving a Younger Man: How Women Are Finding and Enjoying a Better Relationship
- Making It Work: Finding the Time and Energy for Your Career, Marriage, Children, and Self
- with Jamie Raab
  - My Health History
- with Tom Shelby
  - Michelle and Me (2002)
- with James Simon
  - Restore Yourself : A Woman's Guide to Reviving her Sexual Desire and Passion for Life (2001)
- with Helen L. Swan
  - Alone After School: A Self-Care Guide for Latchkey Children and Their Parents
  - Self-Care for Kids: A Practical Guide for Children and Their Parents
