= Harold Houston (labor lawyer) =

American lawyer

Harold W. Houston (10 March 1872 – 17 January 1947) was an American labor lawyer who represented union miners during the Paint Creek–Cabin Creek strike of 1912, and defended the UMWA leaders accused of treason in the aftermath of the Battle of Blair Mountain. He also led the legal defense of Sid Hatfield and other defendants who participated in the 1920 Matewan Massacre against members of the Baldwin–Felts Detective Agency.

Houston was from Freedom Township, Portage County, Ohio. He died in Kanawha County, West Virginia.
