= George Brettingham-Moore =

Australian politician

George Edward Brettingham-Moore (11 February 1846 - 12 August 1919) was an Australian state and local politician. He was a member of the Tasmanian House of Assembly from 1903 to 1909, representing the electorate of West Hobart. He was elected an alderman of the Hobart City Council for the period 1902 to 1904.

Brettingham-Moore was born George Edward Moore on 11 February, 1846 in Lincoln, Lincolnshire, England. He was at Rossall School, near Fleetwood, Lancashire where he was included in the 1861 England census with a brother Joseph. As a trainee civil engineer, he served a pupilage of 5 years (August, 1863-68), under Messrs T.E. Harrison and Robt. Hodgson, MM. Inst. C.E., in the office and on new station works and the line through the town of Leeds. In 1868, he went to India to work for the Great Western Peninsular Railway Company. When the railways were nationalised, he spent five years as Deputy Consulting Engineer of Railways to the Government of India, in which he was responsible for an area of 10,000 miles from his base at Kolkata.

He took furlough from September, 1885 and married Eveleen Ida Brettingham in Surrey, England on 28 April 1886. They returned to India in October, 1886. Their three eldest children were born at Barrackpore in March, 1887 and April, 1888 and at Waltair in November, 1890. Eveleen, and their daughter Marie, were active in the Arts and Crafts movement. An altar and tabernacle which they designed are now installed in St John's Church in Richmond, Tasmania.

Following his retirement from the Indian government, he lived in Brittany, France for six years, where his fourth child was born in January, 1894, before moving to Tasmania in 1899. In 1900 he was engineer in charge of constructing the rail-bed of the Gretna to Russell (now Westerway) section of the Great Western Railway, Tasmania. He gave evidence to a Tasmanian Parliamentary Committee concerning the railway.

He became involved in business during his years in parliament, serving as director of a mining company and local director for a hydroelectric company. He became involved in pastoral interests, purchasing the Darlington estate on Maria Island and a 10,000 acre estate at Rheban, on the mainland opposite the island.

He was elected to the House of Assembly at the 1903 state election and was re-elected in 1906. He departed the seat on 30 April 1909 when it was abolished. He was particularly interested in railway and hydroelectric issues in his time in parliament.

He changed the family name to Brettingham-Moore by deed poll on 15 October, 1906.

He died in August 1919 and was buried at Cornelian Bay Cemetery. His second son, Hubert, later became a successful lawyer and was appointed Crown Solicitor of Tasmania.
