= William Brownell (politician) =

Australian politician

William Percival Brownell (22 August 1862 - 2 December 1916) was an Australian politician. He was a member of the Tasmanian House of Assembly from 1903 to 1909, representing the electorate of Franklin.

Brownell was born in Hobart, the son of Hobart alderman William Freeman Brownell, and was educated at the private Hobart High School. He was a businessman outside of politics, working as managing director of his family's firm, Brownell Bros. Limited and as a local director of the Northern Assurance Company. He was a City of Hobart alderman, a member of the Town Board of New Town, and chairman of the Hobart General Hospital board of management. He was also the Hobart chairman of the Reform League. Brownell was a prominent Methodist, and was a long-serving superintendent of the Melville Street Sunday School.

Brownell was elected to the House of Assembly as an independent at the 1903, defeating the state Treasurer, Stafford Bird. He supported the abolition of the Tasmanian Legislative Council, decrying its members for their lack of knowledge of legislation and was opposed to the repeal of the income tax, arguing instead that it should be lessened. He was supportive of "justifiable" public works, especially in what he viewed as the underdeveloped north-west coast, and advocated for government accountability in public works spending. He strongly opposed the Propsting government's preferred replacement for the income tax, the occupancy tax, declaring it "one of the unfairest and most iniquitous taxes ever introduced". He was reported to have been offered and declined the position of Treasurer when the government of John Evans took power in 1904. Brownell retired from the House of Assembly at the 1909 election, intending to enter federal politics at the 1910 election; however, after announcing his candidacy for the Denison seat, he withdrew in October 1909. He later contested the 1914 election for the Legislative Council seat of Hobart, but was unsuccessful.

He died in December 1916 following a severe stroke, and was buried in the Cornelian Bay Cemetery.
