= Bobby Houston (footballer, born 1889) =

Scottish footballer

Personal information
- Full name: Robert Gardner Houston
- Date of birth: 28 July 1888
- Place of birth: Kilbarchan, Scotland
- Date of death: 9 May 1915 (aged 26)
- Place of death: Pas-de-Calais, France
- Position: Goalkeeper

Senior career*
Years	Team	Apps	(Gls)
1912–1914	Partick Thistle	8	(0)
1913	→ Abercorn (loan)	14	(0)
1914	Johnstone	3	(0)
- * Club domestic league appearances and goals

Robert Gardner Houston (28 July 1888 – 9 May 1915) was a Scottish professional footballer who played as a goalkeeper in the Scottish League for Partick Thistle, Abercorn and Johnstone.

== Personal life ==
Houston served as a gunner in the Royal Field Artillery during the First World War and was attached to the Seaforth Highlanders as a private when he was killed in action in France on 9 May 1915. He is commemorated on the Le Touret Memorial.

== Career statistics ==
Appearances and goals by club, season and competition
Club	Season	League			Scottish Cup		Total	
Club	Season	Division	Apps	Goals	Apps	Goals	Apps	Goals
Partick Thistle	1911–12	Scottish First Division	3	0	2	0	5	0
Partick Thistle	1912–13	Scottish First Division	5	0	1	0	6	0
Partick Thistle	Total		8	0	3	0	11	0
Abercorn (loan)	1913–14	Scottish Second Division	14	0	1	0	15	0
Johnstone	1914–15	Scottish Second Division	3	0	—		3	0
Career total			25	0	4	0	29	0
