= Oppositionist =

Oppositionist could mean:

- Ministerialists and Oppositionists (Western Australia)
- A member of various opposition parties
