= Zach Houston =

American poet

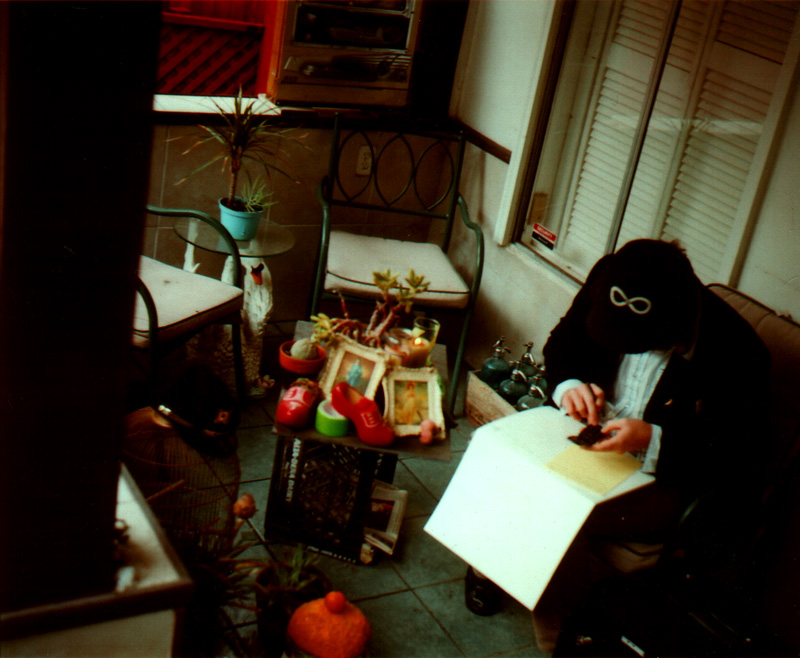
- Born: Marin County, California, U.S.
- Known for: Artist, Poet
- Website: zachhouston.com

Zach Houston is a California conceptual artist and poet. He is best known for his "poemstore", an ongoing business/literature performance. Many other poets have similar projects. The "poemstore" has received coverage from Charles Osgood, CBS News, Katie Couric, The NY Times, The LA Times, reviewed by Kenneth Baker, critic for the San Francisco Chronicle NPR, and many others. In 2011 the poemstore was the focus of two major exhibitions. One, entitled poemstore at the Nelson-Atkins Museum of Art in Kansas City, Missouri. The other, a collaborative exhibition at SF Camerawork. in 2012 he was featured in the exhibition in Den Haag, Holland, Let Us Keep Our Own Noon. In 2008 Zach Houston was the runner up for San Francisco SECA Award by SF MOMA. Zach Houston has also pursued a musical career. SPACE TIME, use your words, and Freeerways.
