= Margaret Houston =

Margaret Houston may refer to:

- Margaret Bell Houston (1877–1966), American writer and suffragist
- Margaret Lea Houston (1819–1867), First Lady of the Republic of Texas
