= William Houstoun =

William Houstoun may refer to:

- William Houstoun (botanist) (1695–1733), British surgeon and botanist
- William Houston (1746–1788), American teacher and statesman
- William Houstoun (lawyer) (1755–1813), American lawyer, Continental Congressman for Georgia
- Sir William Houstoun, 1st Baronet (1766–1842), British army officer, Governor of Gibraltar
