= Judge Houston =

Judge Houston may refer to:

- James Houston (judge) (1767–1819), judge of the United States District Court for the District of Maryland
- John A. Houston (born 1952), judge of the United States District Court for the Southern District of California

== See also ==
- Justice Houston (disambiguation)
