= George Burns (Australian politician) =

Australian politician (1869–1932)

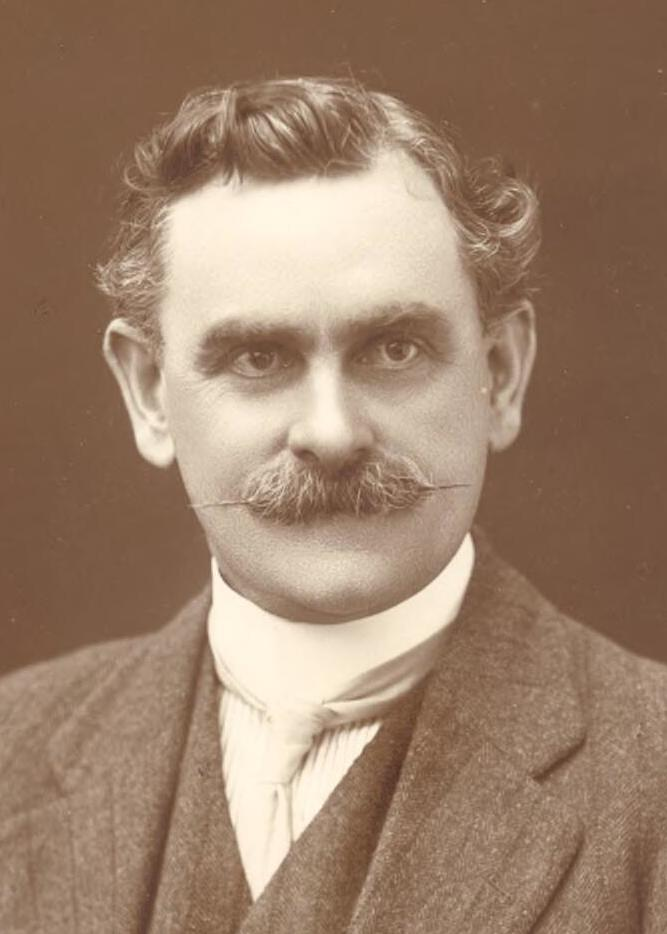

Member of the Australian Parliament for Illawarra
- In office 31 May 1913 – 5 May 1917
- Preceded by: George Fuller
- Succeeded by: Hector Lamond

Personal details
- Born: 19 April 1869 Mogo, New South Wales, Australia
- Died: 15 August 1932 (aged 63) Cremorne, New South Wales, Australia
- Party: Australian Labor Party

George Mason Burns (19 April 1869 – 15 August 1932) was an Australian politician. He was an Australian Labor Party member of the Australian House of Representatives from 1913 to 1917, representing the electorate of Illawarra. He had previously been a member of the Tasmanian House of Assembly from 1903 to 1906.

== Early life ==
Burns was born at Mogo on the South Coast of New South Wales, and was working in mines at thirteen. He joined the Illawarra Miners' Union in 1889 and became the delegate for the South Bull Miners' Lodge. He was heavily involved in advocating for the passage of the Coal Mines Regulation Act 1902 in New South Wales, and was blacklisted by mine owners following its passage, so moved to Tasmania that year.

== Politics ==
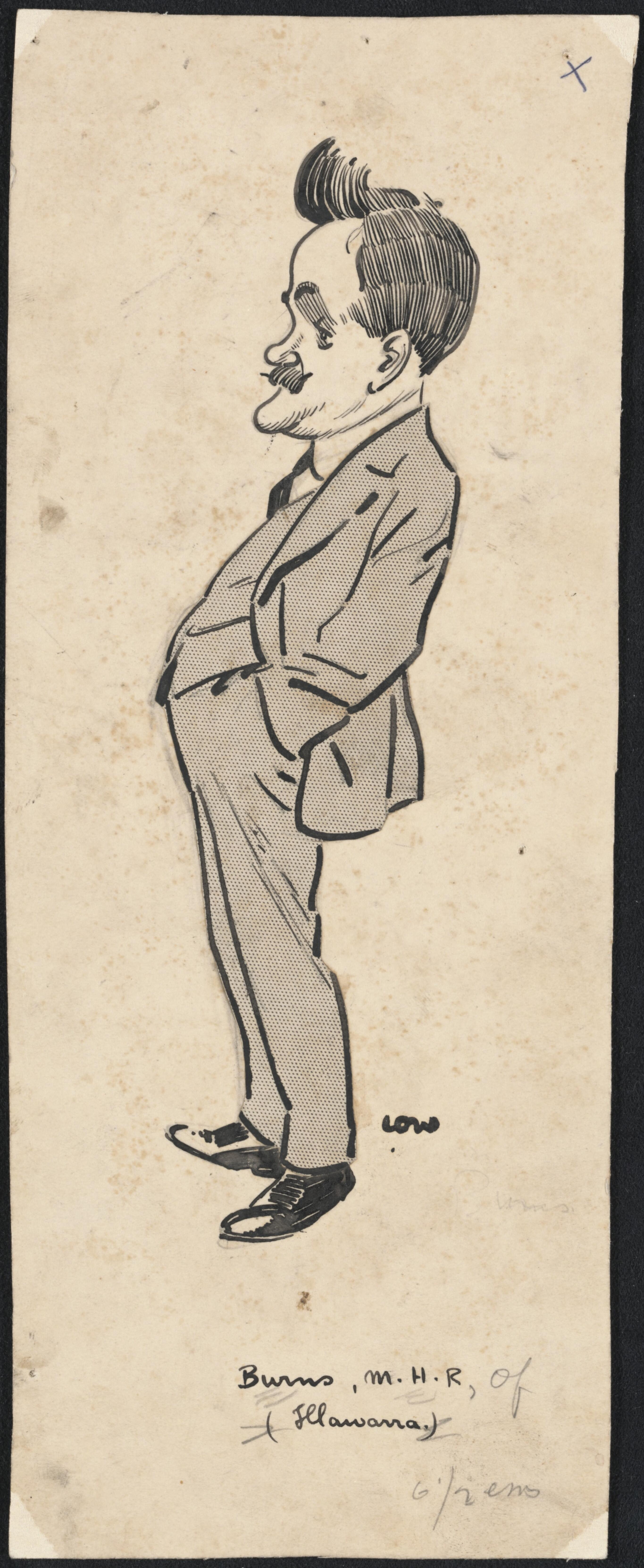
Burns caricatured by David Low in 1915

He was elected to the Tasmanian House of Assembly at the 1903 state election, and was re-elected at the 1906 election, but resigned in November that year to contest the 1906 federal election in Denison, in which he was unsuccessful. In 1907, he went to Queensland to work as secretary and organiser of the Charters Towers branch of the Australian Workers' Union.

He was elected to the House of Representatives for the New South Wales seat of Illawarra at the 1913 federal election, having unsuccessfully contested the same seat in 1910. He was re-elected at the 1914 election, and was one of the earliest parliamentary opponents of conscription during World War I, but was defeated at the 1917 election. Burns again unsuccessfully contested the seat of Illawarra in the 1919 federal election, standing for the breakaway Industrial Socialist Labor Party. Returning to the Labor Party, he was an unsuccessful candidate for St George at the 1925 New South Wales state election.

== Personal life ==
He died at his home at Cremorne in 1932 and was cremated. He had married well-known Labor women's organiser Lilian Locke in 1906.

== Notes ==
Parliament of Australia
Preceded by George Fuller	Member for Illawarra; 1913–1917	Succeeded by Hector Lamond
