= Charles Fenton Sr. =

Australian politician

Charles Benjamin Monds Fenton (25 November 1839 – 1 September 1908) was an Australian politician. He was the Protectionist member for Wellington in the Tasmanian House of Assembly from 1893 to 1897. He died in 1908 in Burnie.
