= Herbert Payne =

Australian politician (1866–1944)

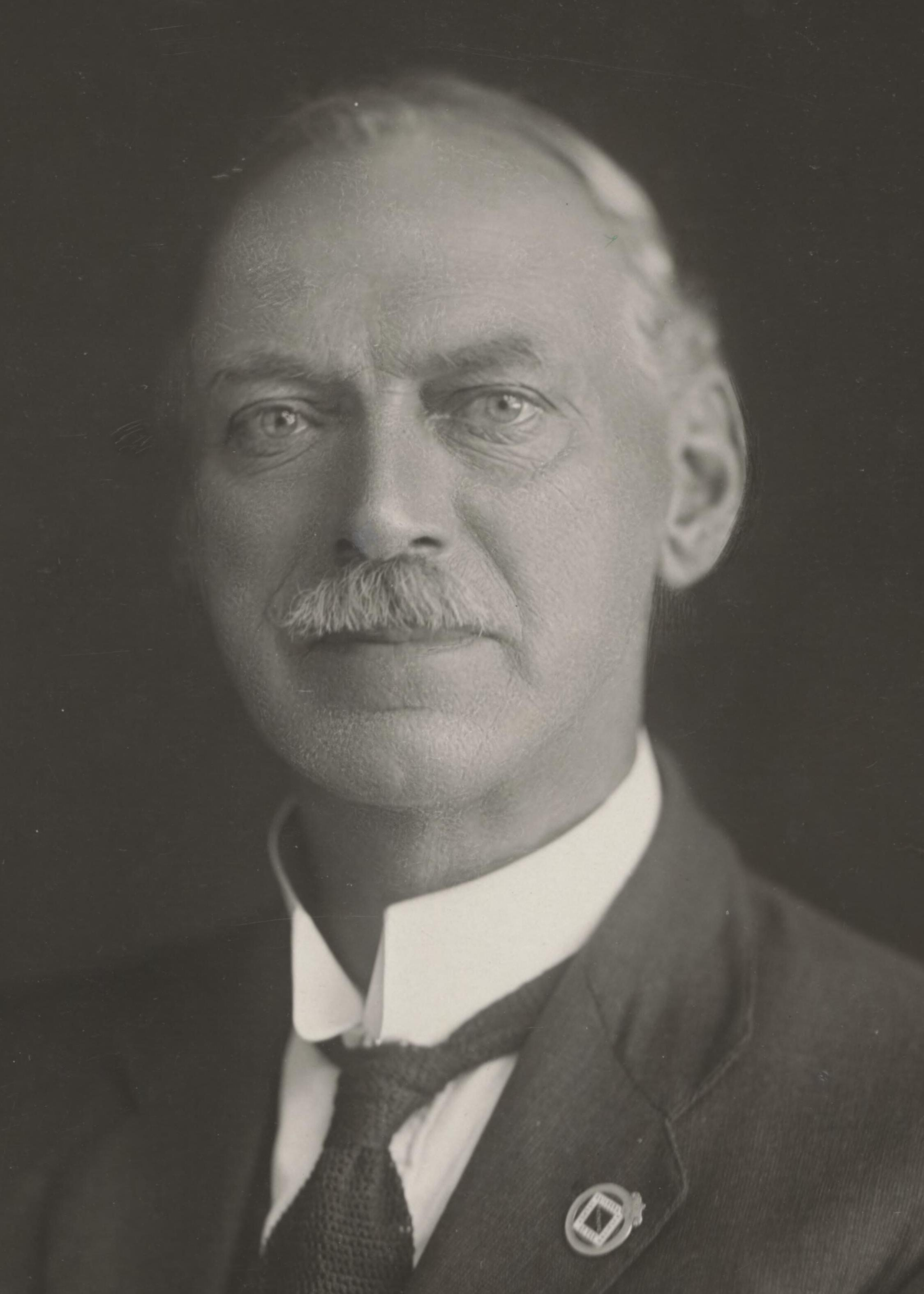
- Payne c. 1920

Senator for Tasmania
- In office 1 July 1920 – 30 June 1938

Treasurer of Tasmania
- In office 14 June 1912 – 6 April 1914
- Premier: Albert Solomon
- Preceded by: Elliott Lewis
- Succeeded by: Joseph Lyons

Member of the Tasmanian House of Assembly
- In office 30 April 1909 – 28 January 1920
- Constituency: Darwin
- In office 2 April 1903 – 30 April 1909
- Constituency: Burnie

Personal details
- Born: 17 August 1866 Hobart, Tasmania, Australia
- Died: 26 February 1944 (aged 77) Coburg, Victoria, Australia
- Party: Liberal (to 1917); Nationalist (1917–1931); UAP (from 1931)
- Spouses: Margaret Stones (m. 1888; died 1936) Constance Rogers (m. 1938)
- Relations: Leslie Payne (son)
- Occupation: Draper

Herbert James Mockford Payne (17 August 1866 – 26 February 1944) was an Australian politician. He served as a Senator for Tasmania from 1920 to 1938 and as a member of the Tasmanian House of Assembly from 1903 to 1920.

Payne was born in Hobart and worked as a draper in Burnie prior to entering politics. He was first elected to parliament at the 1903 state election and was known for his fiscal conservatism. He served as state treasurer and minister for agriculture and railways from 1912 to 1914. Payne was elected to the Senate at the 1919 federal election, representing the Nationalist Party. He won re-election twice, joining the United Australia Party (UAP) in 1931, but was defeated in 1937. He is primarily remembered for his role in the introduction of compulsory voting for federal elections, which became law in 1924 through his private senator's bill.

== Early life ==
Payne was born on 17 August 1866 in Hobart, Tasmania, the son of Hannah (née Reed) and Henry Payne; his father worked as a gardener. He attended the Central State School in Hobart and by 1888 was working in Burnie as a draper's assistant. In about 1892 he established a clothing emporium, marketing himself as "The People's Draper". He was a Freemason and a member of the Manchester Unity Independent Order of Oddfellows, holding the rank of pro-grandmaster.

== State politics ==
Payne was elected to the Tasmanian House of Assembly at the 1903 state election, running in the seat of Burnie. He received the endorsement of the Reform League, an organisation advocating reduced government spending which he had helped to establish in 1902. He subsequently supported the government of William Propsting until its collapse in 1904. Payne's support for spending cuts led him to propose the closure of the University of Tasmania; he also called for direct taxation to be reduced. He was re-elected in 1906 and in the same year was appointed to the state government's Royal Commission into Wages and Wage Earners. He submitted a minority report criticising the labour movement and publicly accused the other two commissioners of misrepresenting the evidence presented to them. In 1907 Payne supported the efforts of Premier John Evans to ban public servants from political campaigning, citing schoolteacher Joseph Lyons' public support of the Australian Labor Party.

In 1909 Payne assisted in the creation of the Liberal League, winning re-election in the new multi-member seat of Darwin at that year's state election. He served as chairman of committees until 1912, when he joined Albert Solomon's new government as treasurer, minister for agriculture and minister for railways. In office he "continued his efforts to shift tax onto 'unearned' wealth and was happy to increase expenditure on education, railways, agricultural improvement and assistance to immigrants". He served as a minister until the government was defeated on a no-confidence motion in April 1914. During World War I, Payne was a prominent loyalist and supporter of conscription. In November 1918, he challenged George Becker, a Labor MP of German ancestry, to a fistfight following a perceived slight, and subsequently "through the open door from the House . . . [they] could be seen exchanging blows amidst great commotion".

== Federal politics ==
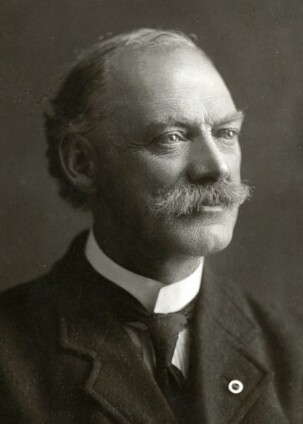
Undated photo

Payne was elected to the Senate as a Nationalist at the 1919 federal election, to a six-year term beginning on 1 July 1920. His election was challenged by a fellow Nationalist, Edward Mulcahy, who had been elected to fill a short-term casual vacancy of less than one year. Mulcahy unsuccessfully argued for the shorter term to be assigned to Payne, but his petition was rejected by the High Court. Payne was re-elected to further six-year terms at the 1925 and 1931 elections, joining the new United Australia Party (UAP) upon its creation in early 1931. He was defeated for re-election in 1937, concluding his term on 30 June 1938 at the age of 71.

Payne emerged as a prominent critic of the Scullin government's policy of high tariffs. He stated his support for a "sane protective policy" and according to Roe "upheld nineteenth-century ideas as to world-ranging free trade being the best guarantor of peace and prosperity". He took an interest in international affairs, visiting Europe, North America and Japan while in office and helping establish a local branch of the Inter-Parliamentary Union. During the Abyssinia Crisis of 1935 he supported sanctions against Italy. Payne served on the Joint Standing Committee on Public Works (1926–1929) and acted as chairman of committees (1929–1932). He was an unsuccessful candidate for President of the Senate in 1935.

=== Electoral reform ===
Over his political career Payne took a keen interest in electoral issues. He is primarily remembered as the author of the Commonwealth Electoral Act 1924, which established compulsory voting for federal elections. He introduced the legislation as a private senator's bill; it was only the third such bill from either house of parliament to become law. Payne's interest in compulsory voting was sparked by the record low voter turnout at the 1922 election, which stood at 59 percent of registered voters nationwide and only 46 percent in Tasmania. After the passage of the bill, turnout increased to 91 percent, an increase of 32 percentage points.

Payne stated that compulsory voting was necessary to counteract "apathy and indolence", but in his second reading speech also hoped that it would bring "a wonderful improvement in the political knowledge of the people" and lead to a higher quality legislature. His bill, a simply worded amendment to the Commonwealth Electoral Act 1918, was notable for its speedy passage and lack of opposition. Prior to the parliamentary debate Nationalist and Country Party MPs both voted to support the bill, and compulsory voting already formed part of the Labor platform. Edward Mann sponsored the bill in the House of Representatives, where it was debated for less than an hour and passed without amendment. It was passed by the House eight days after being introduced to the Senate on 16 July, and received royal assent one week later on 31 July.

Outside of compulsory voting, Payne advocated proportional representation for Senate elections and for drawing boundaries so communities were not divided between two House of Representatives electorates. He also supported the creation of "native representative councils" in the Territory of New Guinea. He served on the Joint Select Committee on Commonwealth Electoral Law and Procedure in 1926. In 1934 Payne suggested that circular ballots be used to reduce the donkey vote; his suggestion has been cited as a predecessor of the Robson Rotation system that was adopted in Tasmania in 1979 to address the same issue. Prior to his election to the Senate he had also served on a select committee into Tasmania's Electoral Act, which suggested that party affiliations be listed on ballot papers. This recommendation was eventually adopted at federal level in 1983.

== Personal life ==
Payne married Margaret Stones on 18 January 1888 in Ulverstone. The couple had two sons and two daughters, with his oldest son Leslie (died 1942) also serving in the Tasmanian House of Assembly. After entering politics Payne supplemented his income through investing and land speculation. He was widowed in 1936 and remarried on 30 March 1938 to Constance Rogers. After leaving parliament he retired to the northern suburbs of Melbourne. He died at the Sacred Heart Private Hospital in Coburg on 26 February 1944, aged 77.
