= Patrick Houston =

Patrick Houston may refer to:

- Project Pat (Patrick Houston, born 1973), American rapper
- Patrick Houston (captain) (1837–1910), American state senator and military man
- Sir Patrick Houston, 1st Baronet (died 1696)
