= Frances C. Houston =

American painter

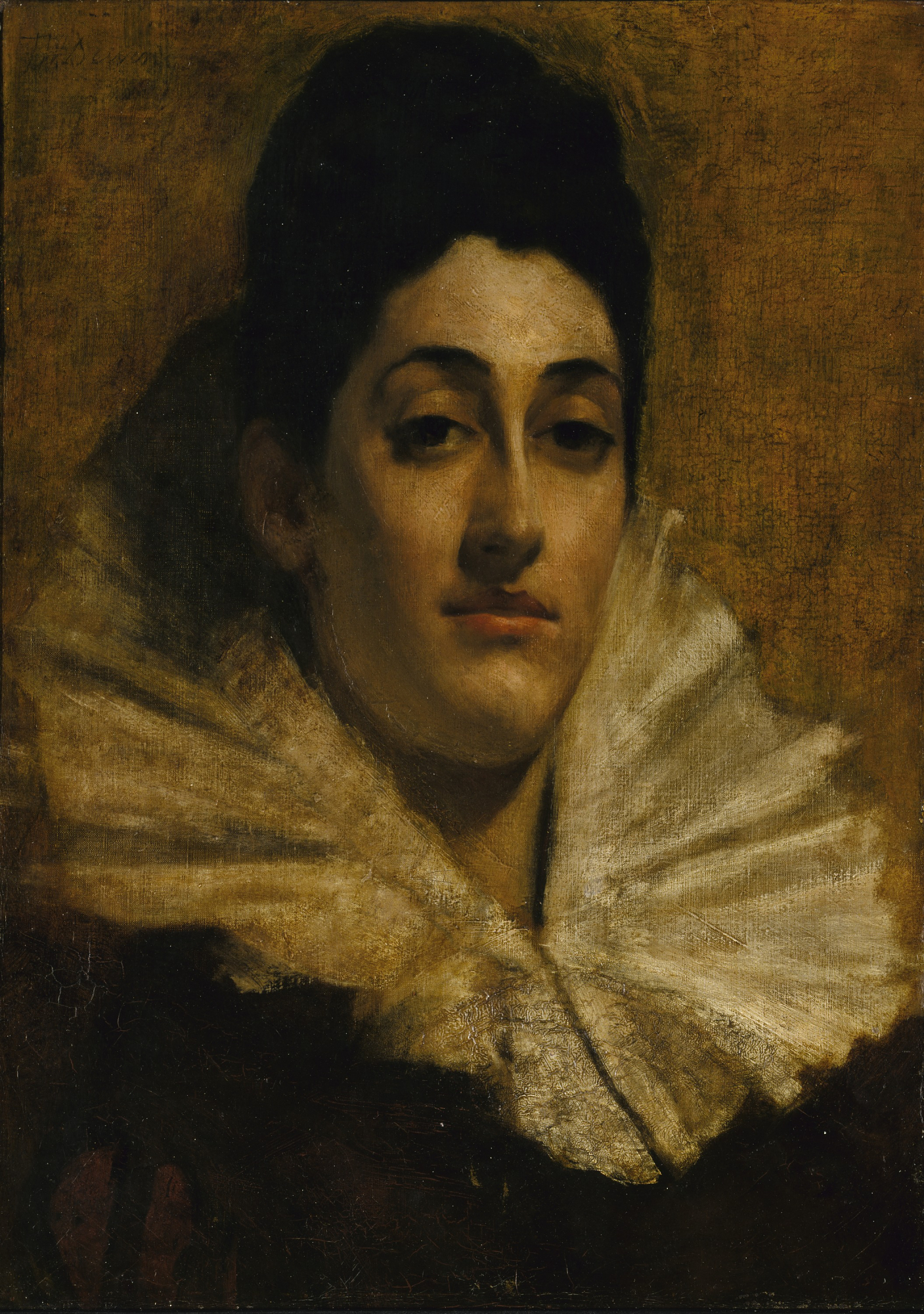
Frances C. Houston, painted by Thomas Dewing

Frances C. Lyons Houston (January 14, 1851 or 1867 or January 17, 1867 – 1906) was an American painter. Houston was born in Hudson, Michigan. She died in Windsor, Vermont in October 1906.

Houston primarily worked in oils, but also did work in watercolors, pottery, goldsmithing, and jewelry making. Her primary subjects were portraits. Among her subjects noteworthy subjects was the actress Ethel Barrymore.

== Life and career ==
Houston was born January 14, 1851 in Hudson, Michigan (though her date of birth is sometimes listed as either January 14 or January 17, 1867). Her parents were Lafayette A. Lyon and Charlotte (Hand) Lyon.

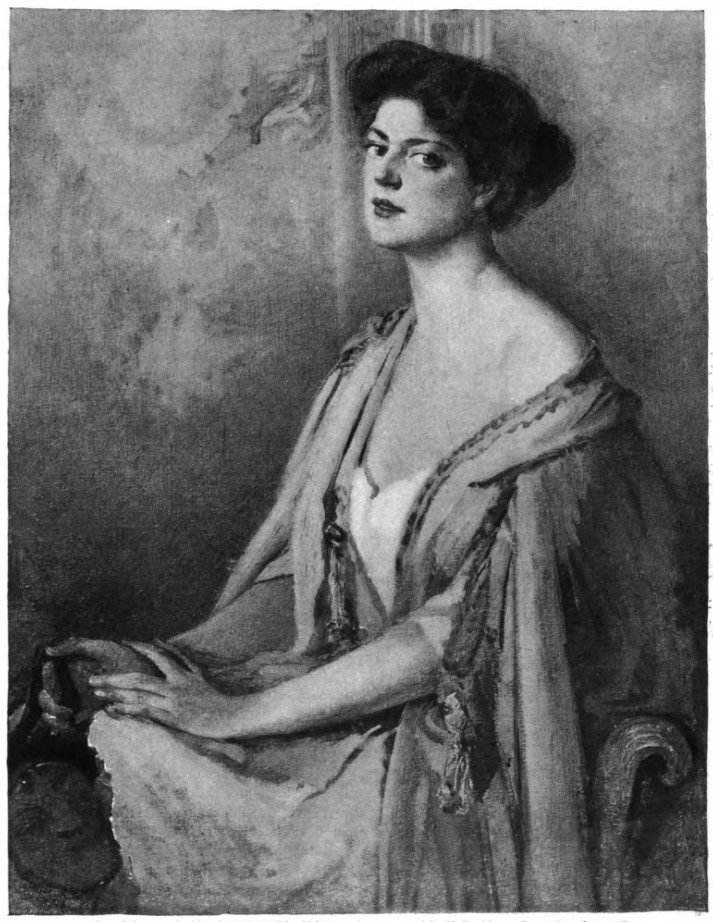
A print of Houston's portrait of Ethel Barrymore

Houston studied in Paris with the French artists Jules Lefebvre and Gustave Boulanger at the Julian Academy. She also lived in Italy for a short time. She married William C. Houston, a Boston businessman. After her marriage she took classes at the school of the Museum of Fine Arts in Boston where she took the classes of Thomas Dewing. Dewing and Houston would remain close for the remainder of her life. Dewing painted a portrait of her which is currently on view at the Smithsonian American Art Museum. Dewing would later encourage Houston and her husband to move to Cornish, New Hampshire, where Dewing had a summer home. At this time Cornish had a thriving art community which included Augusutus Saint-Gaudens, George de Forest Brush, and Charles Platt, among others. Houston had a summer home in Cornish from 1891 to 1906. She was popular among the other members of the community, praised for her genial and kind personality. Houston often painted portraits of other Cornish residents.

Houston was a member of the Boston Water Color Club, the Boston Society of Arts & Crafts, the New York Water Color Club.

Houston was an avid gardener. She was also active in the local community. Houston founded "The Mothers and Daughters' Club" with another woman of the Cornish community, Laura Walker, wife of Henry O. Walker. The group was started with the goal of allowing the women who lived in Cornish seasonally to become closer to the wives of the local farmers. The club involved group readings, travel talks, rug and carpet creation, and weaving. Houston made designs for rug weaving, and those made by the club were sold starting in 1903. Part of the purpose of weaving the rugs and carpets was to teach women about art.

Later in life Houston shifted her focus away from painting, though she continued to exhibit, particularly at the Boston, New York, and Philadelphia Exhibitions.

After Houston died, Dewing convinced the editor of Century Magazine to reproduce Houston's portrait of Ethel Barrymore, and wrote that it was her last work before she passed. Dewing also praised her work for its beauty and technique. Houston's works were exhibited after her death at Doll & Richards in Boston in 1908, from March 26 to April 7.

== Exhibitions ==
Houston exhibited at the Boston Art Club in 1880 and at an Atlanta Exposition in an unknown year, where she received a bronze medal. (Note: She also exhibited in Naples and Philadelphia, though the years of these exhibitions are not known.) Houston exhibited at the Great Art Loan in Detroit, Michigan in 1883. Houston first exhibited at the Paris Salon in 1889 with a study of Woman of Capri. Houston exhibited at the Royal Academy in 1890 with Head of a Capri girl. At this time she had an address at 115, Rione Amedeo, Naples. She also exhibited in 1900 at the Paris World's Fair with a portrait, where she received an honorable mention award. Houston also exhibited at the Worcester Art Museum in 1903. Houston's work Indian Summer was exhibited at the Louisiana Purchase Exposition in 1904 for which she received a medal, and she also showed two pieces of jewelry. Houston exhibited at the St. Botolph Club in Boston in 1905.

== List of known works ==
=== Portraits ===
- Portrait of Ethel Barrymore
- Woman of Capri, exhibited at the Paris Salon in 1889
- Head of a Capri Girl, exhibited at the Royal Academy in 1890
- A Standing Female Nude, black chalk on paper, 62.5 by 47.4 cm, sold at auction in 2011 by Christie's
- Portrait of Mrs. B, displayed at the St. Botolph Club in 1905, loaned by John L. Batchelder, Jr., Esq.
- Portrait of Rita, displayed at the St. Botolph Club in 1905, loaned by F.R. Millliken, Esq.
- Portrait of Mr. B., displayed at the St. Botolph Club in 1905, loaned by J. William Beal, Esq.
- Portrait of Mrs. N., displayed at the St. Botolph Club in 1905, loaned by George Nightingale, Esq.
- Portrait of Francis H. Davenport, displayed at the St. Botolph Club in 1905
- Portrait Study of an unknown subject, displayed at the St. Botolph Club in 1905
- Portrait of Mrs. C., displayed at the St. Botolph Club in 1905, loaned by Winston Churchill, Esq.
- Portrait Head of an unknown subject, displayed at the St. Botolph Club in 1905, loaned by John I. Batchelder, Jr., Esq.
- Portrait of Richard Mann, displayed at the St. Botolph Club in 1905, loaned by A.E. Mann, Esq.
- Portrait of Miss Houston, displayed at the St. Botolph Club in 1905, loaned by J.C. Fairchild, Esq.
- Portrait, Cavaliero Francesco Mancini, displayed at the St. Botolph Club in 1905
- Portrait of Miss M., displayed at the St. Botolph Club in 1905, loaned from Robert M. Morse, Esq.
- Francis, displayed at the St. Botolph Club in 1905 from a loan by J.C. Fairchild, Esq.
- Ellen, displayed at the St. Botolph Club in 1905 on loan from Louis Evan Shipman, Esq.
- Jane, displayed at the St. Botolph Club in 1905, loaned by Pope Veatman, Esq.
- Portrait of Miss T., displayed at the St. Botolph Club in 1905 from a loan by E.V.R. Thayer, Esq.
- Portrait of Mrs. W., displayed at the St. Botolph Club in 1905 from a loan by Samuel D. Warren, Esq.
- Portrait of Mrs. M., displayed at the St. Botolph Club in 1905 on a loan A.E. Mann, Esq.
- Charlotte, a portrait of her daughter completed before 1898, last known to be in a private collection
- Mrs. J.C. Fairchild and Children, also known as Summer or Portrait Group - Summer, done before 1905, as of 1985 was in a private collection; displayed at the St. Botolph Club in 1905, where it is noted as being unfinished
- Granddaughter Frances with Cat, last known to be in a private collection
- Mrs. Winston Churchill, done before 1905

=== Other ===
- Garden with Irises, a pastel, last known to be in a private collection
- Summer Evening, done in 1905, exhibited at the St. Botolph Club the same year on loan from Albion Lang, was with the Plainfield Historical Society in 1985, gift of the estate of Albion Lang
- Indian Summer, won a medal at the Louisiana Purchase Exposition and displayed at the St. Botolph Club in 1905
- The Mirror, which was exhibited at the Worcester Art Museum in 1903, and at the St. Botolph Club in 1905
- Larghetto, displayed at the St. Botolph Club in 1905
- Crayon Study of an unknown subject, displayed at the St. Botolph Club in 1905
- The Spinner, oil on canvas, 15" by 18", displayed at the St. Botolph Club in 1905 on a loan from W.J Hoyt, Esq., sold at auction in 2010
- Liseuse, displayed at the St. Botolph Club in 1905
- In the Studio, displayed at the St. Botolph Club in 1905
- Sabra, displayed at the St. Botolph Club in 1905 on loan from John I. Batchelder, Jr. Esq.
- The Dryad, displayed at the St. Botolph Club in 1905
