= Victor Houston =

Victor Houston may refer to:

- Victor S. K. Houston (1876–1959), American politician from Hawaii
- Victor Houston (athlete) (born 1974), Barbadian track and field athlete
