= Lambert Houston =

Chinese-American actor

Lambert Faistauer Houston (Chinese: 蓝波儿; born July 19, 1991) is a Chinese-American actor known for his acting in Hello Mr. Billionaire, The Chinese Widow, and Air Strike.

== Early life and education ==
Houston was born to Ira and Andrew Houston in Vienna, Austria and raised in China. Growing up, he danced for the School of American Ballet.

== Filmography ==
- Hello Mr. Billionaire (2018)
- Ex-Files (2014)
- The Chinese Widow also known as The Hidden Soldier or In Harms’ Way (2017)
- Unbreakable Spirit (2018)
- Resurrection Factor (2022)
- The Heavenly Place (2017)

== TV Series & Dramas ==
- Cupid’s Kitchen also known as She Jian Shang De Xin Tiao (2022)
- Dating in the Kitchen (2020)
- Peace Hotel (2018)
