= David Houston (zoologist) =

British zoologist

David Houston is a British zoologist.

Houston demonstrated sex allocation in lesser black-backed gulls in a practical study with Pat Monaghan in 1999.

His research interests include ecology of vultures, egg production and digestive efficiency.
