= Rich Houston =

American football player (1945–1982)

No. 84
- Position: Wide receiver

Personal information
- Born: November 16, 1945; Texarkana, Texas, U.S.
- Died: December 11, 1982 (aged 37); Hackensack, New Jersey, U.S.
- Listed height: 6 ft 2 in (1.88 m)
- Listed weight: 196 lb (89 kg)

Career information
- High school: Dunbar (Texarkana)
- College: East Texas State
- NFL draft: 1969: 4th round, 92nd overall pick

Career history
- New York Giants (1969–1973)

Career NFL statistics
- Receptions: 65
- Receiving yards: 1,121
- Touchdowns: 7
- Stats at Pro Football Reference

Richard Charles Houston (November 16, 1945 – December 11, 1982) was an American professional football wide receiver who played five seasons with the New York Giants of the National Football League (NFL). He was selected by the Giants in the fourth round of the 1969 NFL/AFL draft after playing college football at East Texas State University.

== Early life ==
Richard Charles Houston was born on November 16, 1945, in Texarkana, Texas. He attended Dunbar High School in Texarkana.

== College career ==
Houston played for the East Texas State Lions of East Texas State University from 1964 to 1968. He missed the 1967 season due to being drafted into the United States Army during the Vietnam War. He was a letterman in 1965, 1966, and 1968. Houston caught 76 passes for 1,361 yards and 11 touchdowns during his college career. He was inducted into the school's athletics hall of fame in 1994.

== Professional career ==
Houston was selected by the New York Giants in the fourth round, with the 92nd overall pick, of the 1969 NFL/AFL draft. He played in six games for the Giants during the 1969 season, catching two passes for 69 yards and returning 12 kicks for 252 yards. He appeared in 13 games, starting four, in 1970, recording four receptions for 68 yards, eight kick returns for 173 yards, one fumble, and one fumble recovery. Houston played in 13 games, starting 12, in 1971, catching 24 passes for 426 yards and four touchdowns. He started all 14 games for the Giants during the 1972 season, totaling 27 receptions for 468 yards and three touchdowns, one fumble, and one fumble recovery. The Giants finished the season with an 8–6 record, third in the NFC East. Houston appeared in all 14 games for the second consecutive season in 1973, recording eight receptions for 90 yards and 15 kick returns for 375 yards. He was released by the Giants in 1974.

== Death ==
Houston was killed in a car crash on December 11, 1982, in Hackensack, New Jersey.
