= Charles Stewart (Australian politician) =

Australian politician

Charles Lennox Stewart (c. 1844 – 18 October 1919) was an Australian politician.

Stewart was born in England. In 1903, he was elected to the Tasmanian House of Assembly as the member for East Launceston. In 1909, with the introduction of proportional representation, he ran for the multi-member seat of Bass, but was defeated. He died in Launceston in 1919.
