= Herman A. Barnett =

Tuskegee Airman and American physician (1926–1973)

Herman Aladdin Barnett III (January 22, 1926 – May 27, 1973) was an American fighter pilot, surgeon and anesthesiologist. He became the first black graduate from the University of Texas Medical School in 1953.

== Early life and education ==
Herman Barnett was born in Austin, Texas, on January 22, 1926. He attended Grant Elementary School in San Antonio, Kealing Junior High, and Anderson High School in Austin. He graduated from Phyllis Wheatley High School in Austin in 1943.

== Enlisted service ==
In 1944 Herman Barnett enlisted in the military at Fort Sam Houston.

Due to his high exam scores he was accepted into training at the Tuskegee Institute, the world's only training program exclusively for black pilots. As a Tuskegee Airman, Barnett flew in the 332nd fighter group.

Barnett's career as a pilot ended with the war, before he ever saw combat, being discharged in 1946.

== College education ==
After leaving the military, Herman Barnett attended Samuel Huston College in Austin, Texas, which he received his baccalaureate degree from with high honors in 1948. To continue his education he applied for medical school at the University of Chicago and Meharry Medical College, as well as the University of Texas Medical Branch (UTMB) at Galveston, which was then a white-only school. Prior to his application, on April 27, 1949, Barnett participated in a protest march which covered both the University of Texas campus as well as the state legislature.

Barnett's goal was to attend UTMB, and was prepared for a legal battle to do so. Carter Wesley, the Sweatt Victory Fund, and Lone Star State Medical and Pharmaceutical Association had pledged to raise money to file suit if UTMB had denied his admission on a basis of race.

Barnett was accepted to the University of Chicago, Meharry, and UTMB, becoming the first black student accepted to the school. There was a stipulation to the acceptance though, technically Barnett would be a student at Texas State University for Negroes (TSUN), but would attend UTMB at Galveston under a contract between the schools. The contract program was stopped after the Veterans Administration (Barnett's tuition was covered by the GI Bill) refused to recognize the contract system and Barnett's attorney threatened legal action. Thus, on October 12, 1950, Barnett became enrolled as a regular student of UTMB. In the fall of 1948 Barnett began his classes at UTMB. When attending class Barnett was forced to sit outside the classroom, but according to Barnett there were no major negative acts against him, saying in a letter to James Morton, the president of the Austin NAACP "my every resource will be taxed to find even one unfavorable incident". In 1953 Barnett completed the four-year degree program of the University of Texas School of Medicine, becoming the first black graduate from the school.

== Reported police brutality ==
Barnett's most violent encounter with racism came the year he graduated UTMB. On July 12 a sheriff's deputy, John Connor stopped Barnett for excessive speeding and proceeded to beat him unconscious. When Barnett awoke he found himself bloodied in a squad car driving towards Jefferson Davis Ross, the local justice of the peace. When he tried to identify himself as a graduate from UTMB it only enraged the deputies more. The deputies couldn't believe that he was a graduate from UTMB, and they assumed Barnett's possession of a class ring was due to thievery. Barnett was then pistol-whipped until he was knocked out again. After Barnett was arraigned, the judge and officers agreed he should be taken to the Texas City hospital. Upon arriving at the hospital he was identified by a UTMB student, who alerted Chauncey Leake. Leake had Barnett discharged from Texas City Hospital and moved to John Sealy Hospital in Galveston. Although the circumstances of Barnett's arrest were questionable, it was not investigated much. Police who investigated the incident would not comment on it, and UTMB officials distanced themselves from the matter. Leake advised Barnett not to pursue the matter, offering to pay Barnett's fine himself, Barnett agreed.

== Career history ==
After Graduating from UTMB Dr. Barnett completed his internship and surgical residency at the Medical Branch hospitals. He specialized in trauma, focusing on the physiological changes bodies experienced in emergencies and during postoperative recoveries.

Between 1966 and 1968 Dr. Barnett completed a second residency in anesthesiology at St. Joseph's Hospital in Houston. He served as chief of surgery at the St. Elizabeth's Hospital and the Riverside General Hospital. He was an associate attending surgeon at the University of Texas Medical Branch at Galveston and the Galveston County Memorial Hospital in La Marque; also an attending surgeon at the Herman and St. Joseph's Hospitals in Houston as well as an attending anesthesiologist at St. Joseph's. At the Time of his death he was chief of surgery at the Lockwood Hospital in Houston.

In 1968, appointed by John Connally, Dr. Barnett became the first African-American to serve on the Texas State Board of Medical Examiners.

Between 1968 and 1971 Dr. Barnett was a member of the National Medical Association Board of Trustees.

In 1972 he was elected to the Board of Education of the Houston Independent School District. In January 1973 he became president of this board, becoming the first African American to do so.

Dr. Barnett was also chairman and president of the board of the North East Houston Investment Corporation, a member of the board of directors of the Lockwood National Bank of Houston, the Board of Trustees of Huston-Tillotson College, the Executive Committees of the Houston Medical Forum, and the Lone Star State Medical Association.

== Awards ==
In 1950 he received the Charles A. Pfizer Award. In 1969 he received the Outstanding Citizenship Award from the Omega Psi Phi fraternity. In 1971 he received the Huston-Tillotson Award from the Houston Chapter of the Huston-Tillotson Alumni Association. On August 13, 1973 (after his death) he was awarded the 28th Distinguished Service Medal of the National Medical Association.

== Bronze Eagles Flying Club ==
In 1968 Barnett co-founded the Bronze Eagles Flying Club, an African-American flying club which holds an annual exhibition every Memorial Day called Sky Hook. Upon his death, Dr. Barnett was Vice president of the club.

== Death ==
Dr. Barnett died on May 27, 1973, in the crash of his private twin-engine airplane in Wichita, Kansas. Barnett was on his way to an air show sponsored by the Negro Airmen's International Convention when his plane was caught in unexpected crosswinds and went down.

== Commemorations ==
In 1997 The University of Texas Medical Branch established a distinguished professorship award in his name.

The Herman A. Barnett Football Stadium was made in his name in Houston Texas, under the Houston Independent School District.
