= Dick Houston =

Australian cricketer and footballer (1863–1921)

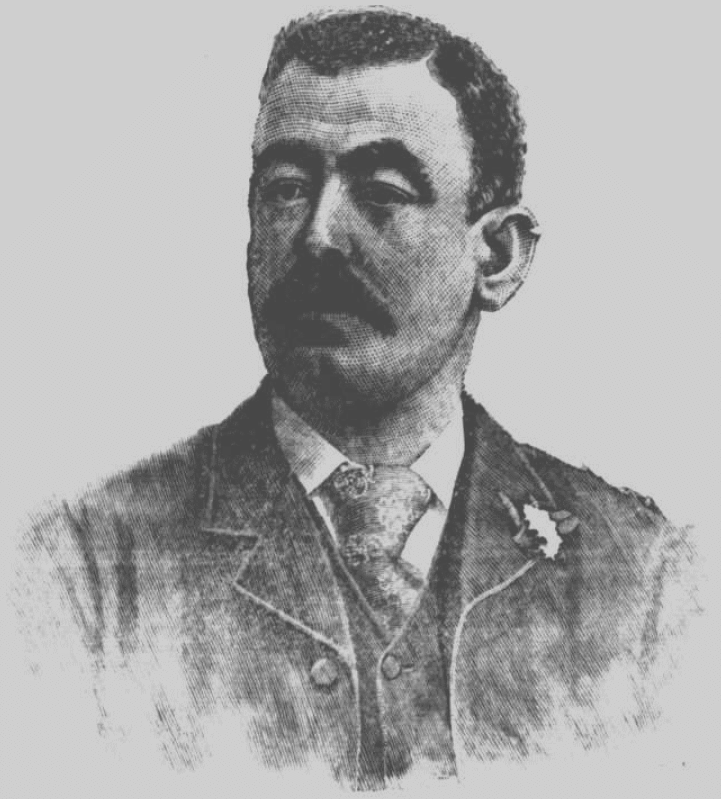

Personal information
- Full name: Richard Shinnock Houston
- Born: 30 June 1863; Brighton, Victoria, Australia
- Died: 27 November 1921 (aged 58); Williamstown, Victoria, Australia
- Batting: Right-handed
- Role: Batsman, occasional wicket-keeper, occasional bowler

Domestic team information
- Years: Team
- 1885-1898: Victoria

Career statistics
Competition	First-class
Matches	23
Runs scored	762
Batting average	20.05
100s/50s	0/4
Top score	72
Balls bowled	200
Wickets	2
Bowling average	57.50
5 wickets in innings	0
10 wickets in match	0
Best bowling	1/13
Catches/stumpings	17/0
- Source: Cricinfo, 21 January 2020

Richard Shinnock Houston (30 June 1863 – 27 November 1921) was an Australian cricketer and Australian rules footballer. He played 23 first-class cricket matches for Victoria between 1885 and 1898.

Dick Houston was a right-handed batsman who also sometimes bowled and kept wicket. He was an early exponent of the switch hit, changing suddenly from right-handed to left-handed in order to play the ball more effectively. His highest first-class score was 72, when he captained Victoria to victory over Tasmania in 1893–94. In the 1880s he won the batting average for North Melbourne for five consecutive seasons, including two seasons when he also won the bowling average. He set a record for the Williamstown Cricket Club in 1902-03 when he scored 213 not out against Brighton.

Houston was also an Australian rules footballer, playing 133 matches for North Melbourne in the Victorian Football Association (VFA) between 1881 and 1890, and also playing three matches for St Kilda in 1889 when the team were short of players, before crossing to Geelong. From 1891 to his retirement from football in 1894, he was the caretaker at Corio Oval in Geelong, and also captained both the Geelong cricket and football teams. He played 71 matches with Geelong, for a career total of 207 VFA matches.

Houston and his wife Marion had four children. At the time of his death, he was the caretaker of the Williamstown Cricket Ground, where he died, aged 58.

== See also ==
- List of Victoria first-class cricketers
