= Benjamin Watkins =

Australian politician

Benjamin Watkins (26 July 1884 – 23 August 1963) was an Australian politician.

== Biography ==
He was born in Hobart. In 1906 he was elected to the Tasmanian House of Assembly as the Labor member for Queenstown; following the introduction of proportional representation in 1909 he was elected as one of the members for Darwin. In 1917 he resigned to contest the federal election but was unsuccessful; he returned to the House as a member for Franklin in 1919. In 1922 he was defeated and ran for the 1922 federal election unsuccessfully; he returned to the House in 1925, serving until 1934.

He was interim leader of the Tasmanian ALP in 1929 when previous leader Joe Lyons resigned to enter federal politics. Watkins relinquished the leadership when Albert Ogilvie was elected the new permanent leader.

He left the Labor Party to become an Independent in 1931. Watkins died in 1963 in Hobart.
