= Charles Metz (Australian politician) =

Australian politician

Charles Metz (5 March 1870 – 2 December 1945) was an Australian politician. He was born in Berrima, New South Wales. In 1906 he was elected to the Tasmanian Legislative Assembly as the member for West Launceston. He initially represented the Labor Party, but after a period as an Independent Labor member ended up in the Liberal Party. In 1909 his seat was abolished and he ran unsuccessfully for Bass. Metz died in Hobart in 1945.
