= Charles Mackenzie (Australian politician) =

Australian politician

Charles John Mackenzie (1837 - 6 August 1921) was an Australian politician. He was a member of the Tasmanian House of Assembly from 1886 to 1909, representing the electorate of Wellington.

Mackenzie was born in Tiruchirappalli, India, the son of an officer in the colonial Indian Army. His family moved to Tasmania when he was two, settling in the Perth area. In 1854, his family moved to Somerset, where he resided for the rest of his life. He became a Table Cape road trustee in 1857, serving until it was superseded by the municipal council system, a Justice of the Peace in 1864, and a member of the marine board in 1865. He was known as one of the first colonist "public men" of the north-west coast of Tasmania.

Mackenzie was elected to the House of Assembly at the 1886 state election and was re-elected six times. Amongst his touted achievements as an MP was winning support for the Burnie breakwater and the Ulverstone-Burnie railway extension. He retired from the House at the 1909 election and contested the Legislative Council seat of Russell, but was unsuccessful. He remained politically involved, and was appointed the inaugural honorary secretary of the Wynyard branch of the Anti-Socialist League following his defeat.

Mackenzie died at his home in Somerset in August 1921 and was buried at Somerset Cemetery.
