= George Leatham =

Australian politician

George Leatham (16 August 1849 – 7 August 1916) was an Australian politician.

He was born in Hobart, Van Diemen's Land. In 1891 he was elected to the Tasmanian House of Assembly as the member for New Norfolk. He was defeated in 1903 but returned in 1906. His initial election in 1906 was declared void due to his being a government contractor providing firewood to the New Norfolk asylum, but he was re-elected in a subsequent by-election in June 1906. In 1909, with the introduction of proportional representation, he stood for Franklin, but was defeated. Leatham died in 1916 in Hobart.
