= 1906 Tasmanian state election =

State election in Australia

All 35 seats in the Tasmanian House of Assembly
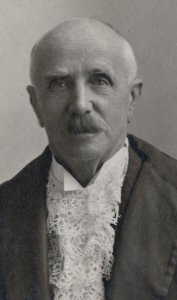

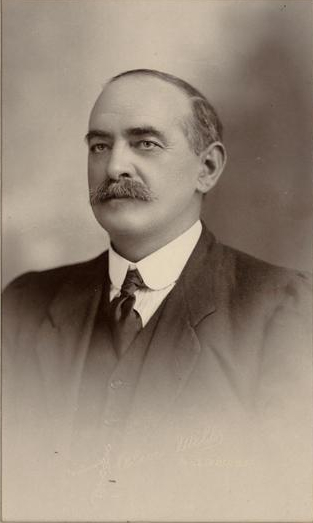
	First party	Second party	Third party
Leader	John Evans	Herbert Nicholls	John Earle
Party	Anti-Socialist	Protectionist	Labor
Leader's seat	Kingborough	Central Hobart	Waratah
Last election	17 seats	9 seats	3 seats
Seats won	15 seats	9 seats	7 seats
Seat change	▼2	Steady	▲4
Premier before election
John Evans
Anti-Socialist
Elected Premier
John Evans
Anti-Socialist

The 1906 Tasmanian state election was held on 29 March 1906 in the Australian state of Tasmania to elect 35 members of the Tasmanian House of Assembly.

John Evans became Premier of Tasmania on 12 July 1904 and was the incumbent premier at the election. At the election, Labor increased its seats to 7, and now held the balance of power.

== Results ==
Official results for House of Assembly elections before 1909 were not retained. Later researchers have published results from other statistical sources and contemporary newspaper reporting, however a number of discrepancies have been identified. Party affiliations were also loose and individual candidates were typically categorised as Ministerialists or Oppositionists based on their likely support for the incumbent government.

Party	Votes	%	+/–	Seats	+/–
Anti-Socialist	12,160	39.27	▲14.78	15	▼2
Labor	10,583	34.18	▲23.47	7	▲4
Protectionist	4,922	15.89	▲34.66	9	Steady
Independents	3,302	10.66	▼3.59	4	▼2
Total	30,967	100.00	–	35	–

== See also ==
- Members of the Tasmanian House of Assembly, 1906–1909
