= 1903 Tasmanian state election =

State election in Australia

All 35 seats in the Tasmanian House of Assembly
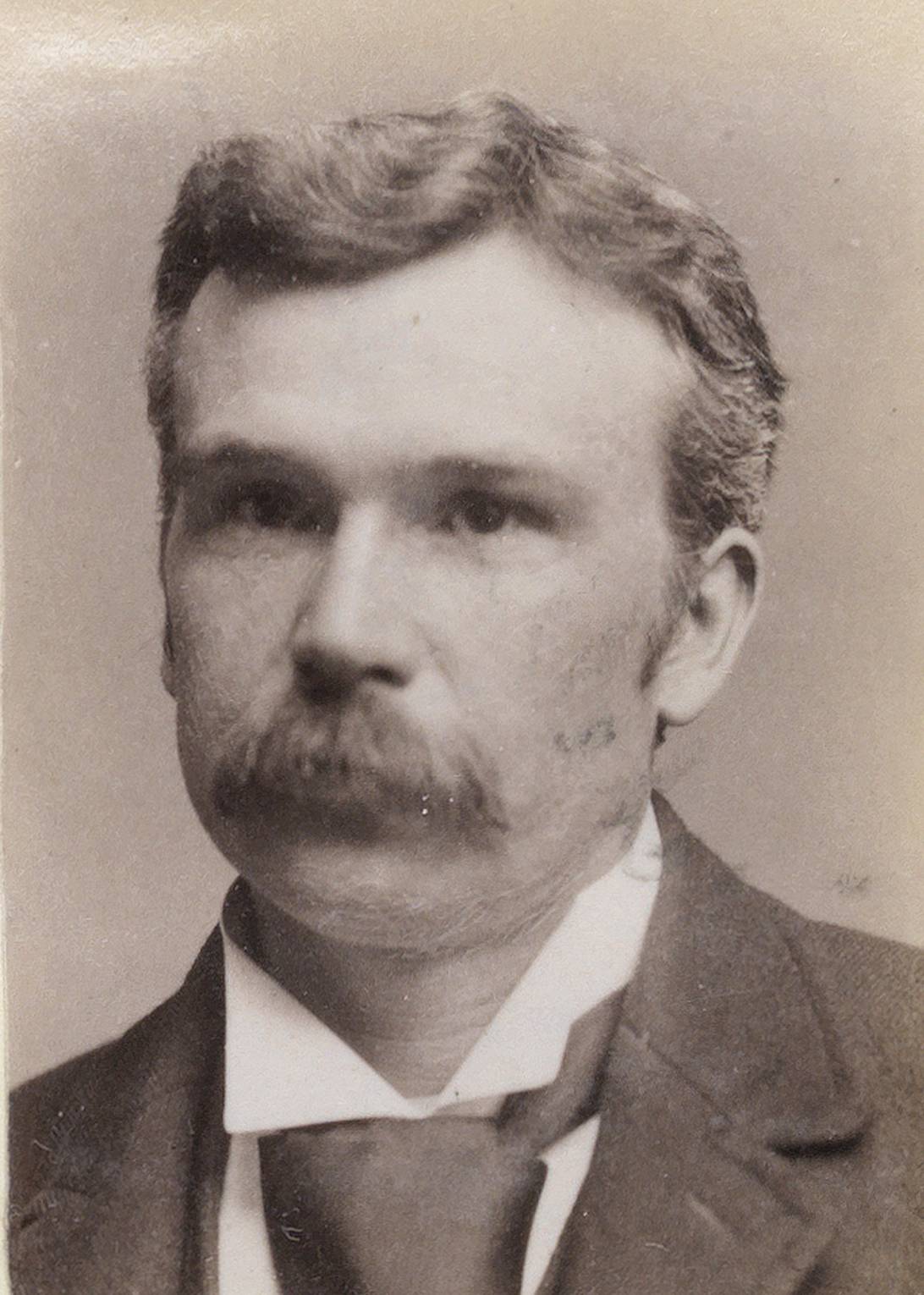

	First party	Second party	Third party
Leader	William Propsting	Elliott Lewis	No leader
Party	Oppositionist	Ministerialist	Labor
Leader's seat	North Hobart	Richmond (lost seat)	N/A
Last election	14 seats	19 seats	0 seats
Seats won	22 seats	7 seats	3 seats
Seat change	▲13	▼11	▲3
Premier before election
Elliott Lewis
Elected Premier
William Propsting

The 1903 Tasmanian state election was held on 2 April 1903 in the Australian state of Tasmania to elect 35 members of the Tasmanian House of Assembly. It was the first election since the federation of the Australian colonies in 1901.

Elliott Lewis, leader of the Ministerial group, entered the election as the incumbent Premier of Tasmania. At the election, the group lost 10 seats and Lewis was unsuccessful in the seat he contested. The Opposition led by William Propsting won government, meaning he became Premier of Tasmania.

== Campaign ==
The 1903 election was the first Tasmanian election to be contested by groups resembling modern political parties. Unlike in other colonies, no local branch of the Australian Labor Party had been established although some of Tasmania's federal MPs had joined the party. The Hobart Workers' Political League was established in the lead-up to the election and preselection ballots were held to determine Labor candidates in the four seats of the north-west coast.

In 1902, Herbert Payne founded the Reform League in Burnie, modelled on Victoria's Kyabram Movement. The Reform League organised branches throughout Tasmania, produced a ten-point platform and endorsed a number of a candidates. It did not continue after the election, in part due a lack of funding, and its candidates did not necessarily sit together in parliament.

== Results ==
Incumbent premier Elliott Lewis lost his own seat, along with the other two cabinet ministers in the House of Assembly.

Official results for House of Assembly elections before 1909 were not retained. Later researchers have published results from other statistical sources and contemporary newspaper reporting, however a number of discrepancies have been identified. Party affiliations were also loose and individual candidates were typically categorised as Ministerialists or Oppositionists based on their likely support for the incumbent government.

Party	Votes	%	+/–	Seats	+/–
Oppositionist	11,880	49.99	▲38.24	22	▲13
Ministerialist	5,755	24.22	▼2.98	7	▼11
Independents	3,349	14.09	▼8.17	3	▼8
Labor	2,516	10.59	New	3	▲3
Others	266	1.12	New	–	New
Total	23,766	100.00	–	35	–

== See also ==
- Members of the Tasmanian House of Assembly, 1903–1906
