= Members of the Tasmanian House of Assembly, 1856–1861 =

This is a list of members of the Tasmanian House of Assembly between the inaugural 1856 elections and the 1861 elections.

| Name | District | Years in office |
|---|---|---|
| Edward Abbott^{[R2]} | Clarence | 1856–1864 |
| Robert Adams^{[7]} | Hobart Town | 1859–1866 |
| William Race Allison | Campbell Town | 1856–1865 |
| Henry Anstey^{[M1]}^{[10]} | Oatlands | 1856–1859 |
| John Archer^{[6]} | Norfolk Plains | 1859–1861 |
| William Archer^{[11]} | Devon | 1860–1862; 1866–1868 |
| John Balfe^{[1]}^{[R3]} | Franklin | 1857–1872; 1874–1880 |
| William Boys ^{[M3]} | Hobart Town | 1857–1861 |
| Henry Butler | Brighton | 1856–1862; 1866–1885 |
| William Champ^{[M1]}^{[3]} | Launceston | 1856–1857 |
| Thomas Chapman^{[M1]} | Hobart Town | 1856–1864; 1866–1873 |
| Alexander Clerke^{[5]}^{[12]} | Launceston | 1857–1860; 1862–1863; 1872–1874 |
| Joseph Cohen^{[12]} | Launceston | 1860–1861 |
| William Crooke^{[1]} | Franklin | 1856–1857 |
| John Crookes^{[3]} | Launceston | 1857–1862; 1866 |
| Adye Douglas^{[4]} | Launceston | 1856–1857; 1862–1884 |
| James Dunn | Hobart Town | 1856–1861 |
| Michael Fenton | New Norfolk | 1856–1861 |
| Thomas Field | Westbury | 1856–1862 |
| Thomas Gellibrand | Cumberland | 1856–1861 |
| James Gibson^{[11]} | Devon | 1856–1860 |
| John Gregson^{[M2]}^{[6]} | Norfolk Plains | 1856–1859 |
| Thomas Gregson^{[M2]} | Richmond | 1856–1872 |
| Ronald Gunn^{[14]} | Selby | 1856–1860 |
| Charles Henty | George Town | 1856–1862 |
| Frederick Houghton^{[8]} | Ringwood | 1859–1861; 1872–1876 |
| Frederick Innes^{[M3]} | Morven | 1856–1862; 1872–1877 |
| Robert Kermode^{[2]}^{[8]} | Ringwood | 1857–1859; 1861–1862 |
| Frederick Lipscombe^{[9]} | Kingborough | 1859–1861 |
| James MacLanachan^{[10]} | Oatlands | 1859–1862 |
| Duncan McPherson | Queenborough | 1856–1861 |
| George Marshall^{[13]} | Sorell | 1860–1861 |
| James Matthews^{[4]} | Launceston | 1857–1861 |
| Charles Meredith^{[M2]} | Glamorgan | 1856–1879 |
| Maxwell Miller^{[R1]} | Hobart Town | 1856–1861; 1862–1864 |
| Askin Morrison^{[13]} | Sorell | 1856–1860 |
| Alfred Nicholas^{[R4]}^{[9]} | Kingborough | 1856–1859 |
| Robert Nutt^{[7]} | Hobart Town | 1856–1859 |
| Sir Robert Officer | Glenorchy | 1856–1877 |
| John Rogers^{[5]} | Launceston | 1856–1857 |
| Adolphus Rooke | Deloraine | 1856–1862; 1868–1869; 1871–1872 |
| Isaac Sherwin^{[14]} | Selby | 1860–1866 |
| Francis Smith^{[M1]}^{[M3]}^{[15]} | Hobart Town; Fingal | 1856–1860 |
| Francis von Stieglitz^{[15]} | Fingal | 1860–1861 |
| Frederick von Stieglitz^{[M3]} | Fingal | 1856–1857 |
| William Weston^{[2]} | Ringwood | 1856–1857 |

== Notes ==
^{1} In January 1857, William Crooke, the member for Franklin, resigned. John Balfe won the resulting by-election on 27 February 1857.
^{2} In May 1857, William Weston, the member for Ringwood, resigned to contest (and win) the Longford seat in the Legislative Council. Robert Kermode was elected unopposed on 20 May 1857.
^{3} In May 1857, William Champ, one of the three members for Launceston and Tasmania's first Premier, resigned. John Crookes won the resulting by-election on 8 June 1857.
^{4} In August 1857, Adye Douglas, one of the three members for Launceston, resigned.. James Matthews won the resulting by-election on 11 September 1857.
^{5} In October 1857, John Rogers, one of the three members for Launceston, resigned. Alexander Clerke won the resulting by-election on 16 November 1857.
^{6} On 11 May 1859, John Gregson, the member for Norfolk Plains, resigned. John Archer won the resulting by-election on 6 June 1859.
^{7} In June 1859, Robert Nutt, one of the five members for Hobart Town, resigned. Robert Adams won the by-election on 30 June 1859.
^{8} In mid-1859, Robert Kermode, the member for Ringwood, resigned. Frederick Houghton won the resulting by-election on 5 July 1859.
^{9} In July 1859, Alfred Nicholas, the member for Kingborough, resigned. Frederick Lipscombe won the resulting by-election on 1 August 1859.
^{10} In October 1859, Henry Anstey, the member for Oatlands, resigned. James MacLanachan was elected unopposed on 11 November 1859.
^{11} In April 1860, James Gibson, the member for Devon, resigned. William Archer was elected unopposed on 4 May 1860.
^{12} In April 1860, Alexander Clerke, one of the three members for Launceston, resigned. Joseph Cohen was elected unopposed on 24 May 1860.
^{13} On 26 June 1860, Askin Morrison, the member for Sorell resigned. George Marshall was elected unopposed on 2 July 1860.
^{14} In June 1860, Ronald Gunn, the member for Selby, resigned. Isaac Sherwin was elected unopposed on 13 July 1860.
^{15} On 1 November 1860, Francis Smith, the member for Fingal. resigned on being appointed as a Puisne Judge of the Supreme Court of Tasmania. Francis von Stieglitz won the resulting by-election on 6 December 1860.

Ministerial by-elections

^{M1} On 1 November 1856, William Champ formed a new Ministry, with himself as Premier and Colonial Secretary, Francis Smith as Attorney General, Thomas Chapman as Colonial Treasurer and Henry Anstey as Secretary for Lands and Works. All four were therefore required to resign and contest ministerial by-elections, at which they were all returned.
^{M2} On 26 February 1857, Thomas Gregson formed a new Ministry, with himself as Premier and Colonial Secretary, Charles Meredith as Colonial Treasurer and John Gregson as Attorney-General. All three were therefore required to resign and contest ministerial by-elections, at which they were all returned.
^{M3} On 25 April 1857, William Weston formed a new four-member Ministry, three of whom were members of the House of Assembly. At the ministerial by-elections which followed, all were returned except Francis Smith, one of the five members for Hobart Town, who was defeated by William Boys on 5 May 1857. However, he was able to nominate for the seat of Fingal, which had been vacated by Frederick von Stieglitz, at which he was returned unopposed on 18 May 1857.

Re-elected members

^{R1} In December 1857, Maxwell Miller, one of the five members for Hobart Town, resigned. He was re-elected at the resulting by-election on 18 December 1857.
^{R2} In February 1858, Edward Abbott, the member for Clarence, resigned. He was re-elected at the resulting by-election on 22 March 1858.
^{R3} In November 1858, John Balfe, the member for Franklin, resigned. He was re-elected at the resulting by-election on 21 December 1858.
^{R4} In January 1857, Alfred Nicholas, the member for Kingborough, resigned. He was returned unopposed on 19 January 1857.

== Sources ==
- Newman, Terry (1994). Representation of the Tasmanian People. Tasmanian Parliamentary Library. ISBN 0-7246-4147-5.
- Parliament of Tasmania (2006). The Parliament of Tasmania from 1856
