= 1856 Tasmanian colonial election =

State election in Australia

1856 Tasmanian colonial elections
8–22 September (House of Assembly); 6–17 October (Legislative Council)	1861 →
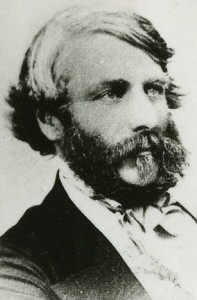
Leader	William Champ
Premier after election
William Champ

The 1856 Tasmanian colonial elections took place from 8 to 22 September 1856 (for the House of Assembly) and 6 to 17 October 1856 (for the Legislative Council). The elections were the first to be held under the Electoral Act 1856, which established responsible government in Tasmania (until 1 January 1856 called Van Diemen's Land) and created a bicameral parliament consisting of the 30-member Tasmanian House of Assembly and the 15-member Tasmanian Legislative Council.

Members were elected using first-past-the-post voting. Following the election, William Champ became the first Premier of Tasmania on 1 November 1856, but his government lasted only 117 days.

== Results ==
=== House of Assembly ===
Elections for members of the House of Assembly took place between 8 and 22 September 1856. Members were elected from single-member 24 single-member divisions, while Hobart Town returned 5 members and Launceston returned 3 members. 16 members were elected unopposed, while the other members were elected using first-past-the-post voting.

Electoral district	Seats	Date	Elected
Launceston	3	8 September	John Rogers, Adye Douglas, William Champ
Clarence	1	15 September	Edward Abbott
Hobart Town	5	15 September	Thomas Chapman, Maxwell Miller, Francis Smith, Robert Nutt, James Dunn
Queenborough	1	15 September	Duncan McPherson
Campbell Town	1	16 September	William Race Allison
Cumberland	1	16 September	Thomas Gellibrand
Glenorchy	1	16 September	Robert Officer (unopposed)
Norfolk Plains	1	16 September	John Gregson (unopposed)
Sorell	1	16 September	Askin Morrison (unopposed)
Fingal	1	17 September	Frederick von Steiglitz (unopposed)
Kingborough	1	17 September	Alfred Nicholas
Oatlands	1	17 September	Henry Anstey (unopposed)
Ringwood	1	17 September	William Weston (unopposed)
Brighton	1	18 September	Henry Butler (unopposed)
Franklin	1	18 September	William Crooke (unopposed)
George Town	1	18 September	Charles Henty (unopposed)
Glamorgan	1	18 September	Charles Meredith (unopposed)
Morven	1	18 September	Frederick Innes (unopposed)
New Norfolk	1	19 September	Michael Fenton (unopposed)
Richmond	1	19 September	Thomas Gregson
Selby	1	19 September	Ronald Gunn (unopposed)
Westbury	1	19 September	Thomas Field (unopposed)
Deloraine	1	20 September	Adolphus Rooke (unopposed)
Devon	1	22 September	James Gibson (unopposed)

== See also ==
- Members of the Tasmanian House of Assembly, 1856–1861
