= List of Australian heads of government by time in office =

The Australian heads of government include the prime minister of Australia, the premiers of the six states of Australia, and the chief ministers of the two self-governing territories of Australia.

== Current heads of government ==
Australian Labor Party Liberal Party of Australia Liberal National Party of Queensland Country Liberal Party

Rank	State	Premier	Portrait	Party	District	Assumed office	Predecessor	Term Time in office	Total Time in office	Election wins
1	(Australian Capital Territory); ACT	Andrew Barr (1973–)		Labor	MLA for Molonglo (2006–2016); Kurrajong (2016–)	11 December 2014	Katy Gallagher (1970–); Labor	11 years, 344 days		2016 2020 2024
2	(South Australia); SA	Peter Malinauskas (1980–)		Labor	MP for Croydon (2018–)	21 March 2022	Steven Marshall (1968–); Liberal	4 years, 244 days		2022 2026
3	(Tasmania); TAS	Jeremy Rockliff (1970–)		Liberal	MHA for Braddon (2002–)	8 April 2022	Peter Gutwein (1964–); Liberal	4 years, 226 days		2024 2025
4	(Australia); AUS	Anthony Albanese (1963–)		Labor	MP for Grayndler (1996–)	23 May 2022	Scott Morrison (1968–); Liberal	4 years, 181 days		2022 2025
5	(New South Wales); NSW	Chris Minns (1979–)		Labor	MP for Kogarah (2015–)	28 March 2023	Dominic Perrottet (1982–); Liberal	3 years, 237 days		2023
6	(Western Australia); WA	Roger Cook (1965–)	3 Feb 15 FREO FSH gnangarra-123	Labor	MP for Kwinana (2008–)	8 June 2023	Mark McGowan (1967–); Labor	3 years, 165 days		2025
7	(Northern Territory); NT	Lia Finocchiaro (1984–)		Country Liberal	MLA for Spillett (2016–)	28 August 2024	Eva Lawler (1962–); Labor	2 years, 84 days		2024
8	(Queensland); QLD	David Crisafulli (1979–)		Liberal National	MP for Broadwater (2017–)	28 October 2024	Steven Miles (1977–); Labor	2 years, 23 days		2024
9	(Victoria (state)); VIC	Ben Carroll (1975–)		Labor	MP for Niddrie (2012–)	28 July 2026	Jacinta Allan (1973–); Labor	115 days		

== Historical heads of government ==
Parties

Australian Labor Party Liberal Party of Australia National Party of Australia Country Liberal Party Other Conservative Party Other Liberalist Party No Party Alignment

Rank	State	Premier	Portrait	Party	District	Assumed office	Left office	Term Time in office	Total Time in office	Election wins
1	(South Australia); SA	Sir; Thomas Playford (1896–1981); GCMG		Liberal & Country League	MP for Gumeracha (1938–1968)	5 November 1938	10 March 1965	26 years, 125 days		1941 1944; 1947; 1950 1953; 1956; 1959 1962
2	(Queensland); QLD	Sir; Joh Bjelke-Petersen (1911–2005); KCMG		Country & National	MP for Barambah (1950–1987)	9 August 1968	1 December 1987	19 years, 114 days		1969 1972; 1974; 1977 1980; 1983; 1986
3	(Tasmania); TAS	Sir; Robert Cosgrove (1884–1969); KCMG		Labor	MHA for Denison (1933–1958)	18 December 1939	18 December 1947	8 years, 0 days	18 years, 182 days	1941 1946; 1948; 1950 1955; 1956
3	(Tasmania); TAS	Sir; Robert Cosgrove (1884–1969); KCMG		Labor	MHA for Denison (1933–1958)	25 February 1948	26 August 1958	10 years, 182 days	18 years, 182 days	1941 1946; 1948; 1950 1955; 1956
4	(Australia); AUS	Sir; Robert Menzies (1894–1978); KT AK CH QC FAA FRS		United Australia	MP for Kooyong, VIC (1934–1966)	26 April 1939	29 August 1941	2 years, 125 days	18 years, 163 days	1940 1949; 1951; 1954 1955; 1958; 1961 1963
4	(Australia); AUS	Sir; Robert Menzies (1894–1978); KT AK CH QC FAA FRS		Liberal	MP for Kooyong, VIC (1934–1966)	19 December 1949	26 January 1966	16 years, 38 days	18 years, 163 days	1940 1949; 1951; 1954 1955; 1958; 1961 1963
5	(Victoria (state)); VIC	Sir; Henry Bolte (1908–1990); GCMG		Liberal & Country	MLA for Hampden (1947–1972)	7 June 1955	6 March 1965	9 years, 272 days	17 years, 77 days	1955 1958; 1961; 1964 1967; 1970
5	(Victoria (state)); VIC	Sir; Henry Bolte (1908–1990); GCMG		Liberal	MLA for Hampden (1947–1972)	6 March 1965	23 August 1972	7 years, 170 days	17 years, 77 days	1955 1958; 1961; 1964 1967; 1970
6	(Tasmania); TAS	Eric Reece (1909–1999); AC		Labor	MHA for Braddon (1945–1975)	26 August 1958	26 May 1969	10 years, 273 days	13 years, 240 days	1959 1964; 1972
6	(Tasmania); TAS	Eric Reece (1909–1999); AC		Labor	MHA for Braddon (1945–1975)	3 May 1972	31 March 1975	2 years, 332 days	13 years, 240 days	1959 1964; 1972
7	(Australian Capital Territory); ACT	Andrew Barr (1973–)		Labor	MLA for Molonglo (2006–2016); MLA for Kurrajong (2016–)	11 December 2014	Incumbent	11 years, 344 days		2016 2020 2024
8	(Western Australia); WA	Sir; David Brand (1912–1979); KCMG		Liberal	MLA for Greenough (1945–1975)	2 April 1959	3 March 1971	11 years, 335 days		1959 1962; 1965; 1968
9	(Tasmania); TAS	Joseph Lyons (1879–1939); CH		Labor	MHA for Wilmot (1909–1929)	25 October 1923	15 June 1928	4 years, 234 days	11 years, 325 days	1925 1931; 1934; 1937
9	(Australia); AUS	Joseph Lyons (1879–1939); CH		United Australia	MP for Wilmot, TAS (1929–1939)	6 January 1932	7 April 1939	7 years, 91 days	11 years, 325 days	1925 1931; 1934; 1937
10	(New South Wales); NSW	Sir; Henry Parkes (1815–1896); GCMG		Non-Party; Liberalism	MLA for East Sydney (1872–1877); Canterbury (1877–1880); Tenterfield (1882–1884)	14 May 1872	8 February 1875	2 years, 270 days	11 years, 278 days	1872 1880; 1887; 1889
10	(New South Wales); NSW	Sir; Henry Parkes (1815–1896); GCMG		Non-Party; Liberalism	MLA for East Sydney (1872–1877); Canterbury (1877–1880); Tenterfield (1882–1884)	22 March 1877	16 August 1877	147 days	11 years, 278 days	1872 1880; 1887; 1889
10	(New South Wales); NSW	Sir; Henry Parkes (1815–1896); GCMG		Non-Party; Liberalism	MLA for East Sydney (1872–1877); Canterbury (1877–1880); Tenterfield (1882–1884)	21 December 1878	4 January 1883	4 years, 14 days	11 years, 278 days	1872 1880; 1887; 1889
10	(New South Wales); NSW	Sir; Henry Parkes (1815–1896); GCMG		Free Trade	MLA for East Sydney (1872–1877); Canterbury (1877–1880); Tenterfield (1882–1884)	25 January 1887	16 January 1889	1 year, 357 days	11 years, 278 days	1872 1880; 1887; 1889
10	(New South Wales); NSW	Sir; Henry Parkes (1815–1896); GCMG		Free Trade	MLA for East Sydney (1872–1877); Canterbury (1877–1880); Tenterfield (1882–1884)	8 March 1889	23 October 1891	2 years, 229 days	11 years, 278 days	1872 1880; 1887; 1889
11	(Australia); AUS	John Howard (1939–); OM AC		Liberal	MP for Bennelong, NSW (1974–2007)	11 March 1996	3 December 2007	11 years, 267 days		1996 1998; 2001; 2004
12	(Victoria (state)); VIC	Sir; Albert Dunstan (1882–1950); KCMG		Country	MLA for Korong and Eaglehawk (1927–1945)	2 April 1935	14 September 1943	8 years, 165 days	10 years, 179 days	1937 1940; 1943
12	(Victoria (state)); VIC	Sir; Albert Dunstan (1882–1950); KCMG		Country	MLA for Korong and Eaglehawk (1927–1945)	18 September 1943	2 October 1945	2 years, 14 days	10 years, 179 days	1937 1940; 1943
13	(Queensland); QLD	Sir; Francis Nicklin (1895–1978); KCMG, MM		Country	MP for Landsborough (1950–1968)	12 August 1957	17 January 1968	10 years, 158 days		1957 1960; 1963; 1966
14	(New South Wales); NSW	Bob Carr (1947–)		Labor	MLA for Maroubra (1983–2005)	4 April 1995	3 August 2005	10 years, 121 days		1995 1999; 2003
15	(Queensland); QLD	William Forgan Smith (1897–1953)		Labor	MP for Mackay (1915–1942)	17 June 1932	16 September 1942	10 years, 91 days		1932 1935; 1938; 1941
16	(New South Wales); NSW	Neville Wran (1926–2014); AC, CNZM, QC		Labor	MLA for Bass Hill (1973–1986)	14 May 1976	4 July 1986	10 years, 51 days		1976 1978; 1981; 1984
17	(Western Australia); WA	Sir; John Forrest (1847–1918); GCMG		Pro-Forrest	MLA for Bunbury (1890–1901)	29 December 1890	15 February 1901	10 years, 48 days		1890 1894; 1897
18	(South Australia); SA	John Bannon (1943–2015); AO		Labor	MP for Ross Smith (1977–1993)	10 November 1982	4 September 1992	9 years, 299 days		1982 1985; 1989
19	(New South Wales); NSW	Sir; Robert Askin (1907–1981); GCMG		Liberal	MLA for Collaroy (1950–1973); Pittwater (1973–1975)	13 May 1965	4 January 1975	9 years, 236 days		1965 1968; 1971; 1973
20	(South Australia); SA	Mike Rann (1953–); CNZM RP		Labor	MP for Ramsay (1993–2012)	5 March 2002	21 October 2011	9 years, 230 days		2002 2006; 2010
21	(South Australia); SA	Don Dunstan (1926–1999); AC, QC		Labor	MP for Norwood (1953–1979)	1 June 1967	17 April 1968	321 days	9 years, 214 days	1970 1973; 1975; 1977
21	(South Australia); SA	Don Dunstan (1926–1999); AC, QC		Labor	MP for Norwood (1953–1979)	2 June 1970	15 February 1979	8 years, 258 days	9 years, 214 days	1970 1973; 1975; 1977
22	(Australian Capital Territory); ACT	Jon Stanhope (1951–); AO		Labor	MLA for Ginninderra (1998–2011)	5 November 2001	12 May 2011	9 years, 188 days		2001 2004; 2008
23	(Western Australia); WA	Philip Collier (1873–1948)		Labor	MLA for Boulder (1905–1948)	16 April 1924	24 April 1930	6 years, 8 days	9 years, 126 days	1924 1927; 1933; 1936
23	(Western Australia); WA	Philip Collier (1873–1948)		Labor	MLA for Boulder (1905–1948)	24 April 1933	20 August 1936	3 years, 118 days	9 years, 126 days	1924 1927; 1933; 1936
24	(Queensland); QLD	Peter Beattie (1952–); AC		Labor	MP for Brisbane Central (1989–2007)	20 June 1998	13 September 2007	9 years, 85 days		1998 2001; 2004; 2006
25	(Western Australia); WA	John Willcock (1879–1956)		Labor	MLA for Geraldton (1917–1947)	20 August 1936	31 July 1945	8 years, 345 days		1939 1943
26	(Queensland); QLD	Annastacia Palaszczuk (1969–)		Labor	MLA for Inala (2006–2023)	14 February 2015	15 December 2023	8 years, 304 days		2015 2017 2020
27	(Victoria (state)); VIC	Sir James McCulloch (1819–1893)		No Party Alignment	MLA for Mornington (1862–1872); Warrnambool (1874-1878)	27 June 1863; 11 July 1868 9 April 1870 20 October 1875	6 May 1868; 20 September 1869; 19 June 1871; 21 May 1877	8 years, 304 days		1864 1866 1868
28	(Victoria (state)); VIC	Daniel Andrews (1972–)		Labor	MLA for Mulgrave (2002–2023)	4 December 2014	27 September 2023	8 years, 297 days		2014 2018 2022
29	(Victoria (state)); VIC	Sir; Rupert Hamer (1916–2004); KCMG AC ED		Liberal	MLA for Kew (1971–1981)	23 August 1972	5 June 1981	8 years, 286 days		1973 1976; 1979
30	(Australia); AUS	Bob Hawke (1929–2019); AC GCL		Labor	MP for Wills, VIC (1980–1992)	11 March 1983	20 December 1991	8 years, 284 days		1983 1984; 1987; 1990
31	(South Australia); SA	Sir; Richard Butler (1885–1966); KCMG		Liberal & Country League	MP for Wooroora (1921–1938)	8 April 1927	17 April 1930	3 years, 9 days	8 years, 210 days	1927 1933; 1938
31	(South Australia); SA	Sir; Richard Butler (1885–1966); KCMG		Liberal & Country League	MP for Wooroora (1921–1938)	18 April 1933	5 November 1938	5 years, 201 days	8 years, 210 days	1927 1933; 1938
32	(Western Australia); WA	Colin Barnett (1950–)		Liberal	MLA for Cottesloe (1990–)	23 September 2008	17 March 2017	8 years, 175 days		2008 2013
33	(Victoria (state)); VIC	John Cain Jr. (1931–2019)		Labor	MLA for Bundoora (1976–1992)	8 April 1982	10 August 1990	8 years, 124 days		1982 1985; 1988
34	(Western Australia); WA	Richard Court (1947–); AC		Liberal	MLA for Nedlands (1982–2001)	16 February 1993	10 February 2001	7 years, 360 days		1993 1996
35	(Western Australia); WA	Sir; James Mitchell (1866–1951); GCMG		Nationalist	MLA for Northam (1905–1933)	17 May 1919	16 April 1924	4 years, 335 days	7 years, 335 days	1921 1930
35	(Western Australia); WA	Sir; James Mitchell (1866–1951); GCMG		Nationalist	MLA for Northam (1905–1933)	24 April 1930	24 April 1933	3 years, 0 days	7 years, 335 days	1921 1930
36	(Western Australia); WA	Sir; Charles Court (1911–2007); AK KCMG OBE		Liberal	MLA for Nedlands (1953–1982)	8 April 1974	25 January 1982	7 years, 292 days		1974 1977; 1980
37	(Victoria (state)); VIC	Steve Bracks (1954–); AC		Labor	MLA for Williamstown (1994–2007)	19 October 1999	30 July 2007	7 years, 284 days		1999 2002; 2006
38	(New South Wales); NSW	Joseph Cahill (1891–1959)		Labor	MLA for Cook's River (1941–1959)	2 April 1952	22 October 1959	7 years, 203 days		1953 1956; 1959
39	(Australia); AUS	Malcolm Fraser (1930–2015); AC CH GCL		Liberal	MP for Wannon, VIC (1955–1983)	11 November 1975	11 March 1983	7 years, 120 days		1975 1977; 1980
40	(Australia); AUS	Billy Hughes (1862–1952); CH KC		Labor	MP for West Sydney, NSW (1901–1917); Bendigo, VIC (1917–1922); North Sydney, NSW (1922–1949)	27 October 1915	14 November 1916	1 year, 18 days	7 years, 105 days	1917 1919; 1922
40	(Australia); AUS	Billy Hughes (1862–1952); CH KC		National Labor	MP for West Sydney, NSW (1901–1917); Bendigo, VIC (1917–1922); North Sydney, NSW (1922–1949)	14 November 1916	17 February 1917	95 days	7 years, 105 days	1917 1919; 1922
40	(Australia); AUS	Billy Hughes (1862–1952); CH KC		Nationalist	MP for West Sydney, NSW (1901–1917); Bendigo, VIC (1917–1922); North Sydney, NSW (1922–1949)	17 February 1917	9 February 1923	5 years, 357 days	7 years, 105 days	1917 1919; 1922
41	(New South Wales); NSW	Sir; Bertram Stevens (1889–1973); KCMG		United Australia	MLA for Croydon (1927–1940)	16 May 1932	5 August 1939	7 years, 81 days		1932 1935; 1938
42	(Queensland); QLD	Sir; Samuel Griffith (1845–1920); GCMG QC		Liberalism	MP for North Brisbane (1878–1888)	13 November 1883	13 June 1888	4 years, 213 days	7 years, 75 days	1883
42	(Queensland); QLD	Sir; Samuel Griffith (1845–1920); GCMG QC		Ministerial	Brisbane North (1888–1893)	12 August 1890	27 March 1893	2 years, 227 days	7 years, 75 days	1883
43	(Northern Territory); NT	Paul Everingham (1943–); AO		Country Liberal	MLA for Jingili (1974–1984)	13 August 1977	16 October 1984	7 years, 64 days		1980 1983
44	(Tasmania); TAS	Robin Gray (1940–)		Liberal	MHA for Wilmot (1976–1984); Lyons (1984–1995)	26 May 1982	29 June 1989	7 years, 34 days		1982 1986
45	(Victoria (state)); VIC	Jeff Kennett (1948–); AC		Liberal	MLA for Burwood (1976–1999)	6 October 1992	19 October 1999	7 years, 13 days		1992 1996
46	(New South Wales); NSW	Sir; Charles Cowper (1807–1875); KCMG		No Party Alignment	MLA for Sydney City (1856–1859); East Sydney (1859–1867)	26 August 1856	2 October 1856	37 days	6 years, 352 days	1865
46	(New South Wales); NSW	Sir; Charles Cowper (1807–1875); KCMG		No Party Alignment	MLA for Sydney City (1856–1859); East Sydney (1859–1867)	7 September 1857	26 October 1859	2 years, 49 days	6 years, 352 days	1865
46	(New South Wales); NSW	Sir; Charles Cowper (1807–1875); KCMG		No Party Alignment	MLA for Sydney City (1856–1859); East Sydney (1859–1867)	10 January 1861	15 October 1863	2 years, 278 days	6 years, 352 days	1865
46	(New South Wales); NSW	Sir; Charles Cowper (1807–1875); KCMG		No Party Alignment	MLA for Sydney City (1856–1859); East Sydney (1859–1867)	3 February 1865	21 January 1866	352 days	6 years, 352 days	1865
46	(New South Wales); NSW	Sir; Charles Cowper (1807–1875); KCMG		No Party Alignment	MLA for Liverpool Plains (1869–1870)	13 January 1870	15 December 1870	336 days	6 years, 352 days	1865
47	(Northern Territory); NT	Marshall Perron (1942–)		Country Liberal	MLA for Fannie Bay (1983–1995)	13 July 1988	26 May 1995	6 years, 317 days		1990 1994
48	(South Australia); SA	Archibald Peake (1859–1920)		Liberal & Democratic Union	MP for Victoria & Albert (1902–1915); Alexandra (1915–1920)	5 June 1909	3 June 1910	363 days	6 years, 312 days	1912 1918
48	(South Australia); SA	Archibald Peake (1859–1920)		Liberal Union	MP for Victoria & Albert (1902–1915); Alexandra (1915–1920)	17 February 1912	3 April 1915	3 years, 45 days	6 years, 312 days	1912 1918
48	(South Australia); SA	Archibald Peake (1859–1920)		Liberal Union	MP for Victoria & Albert (1902–1915); Alexandra (1915–1920)	14 July 1917	8 April 1920	2 years, 269 days	6 years, 312 days	1912 1918
49	(Tasmania); TAS	Sir; Walter Lee (1874–1963); KCMG		Commonwealth Liberal	MHA for Wilmot (1909–1946)	15 April 1916	12 August 1922	6 years, 119 days	6 years, 290 days	1916 1919; 1922
49	(Tasmania); TAS	Sir; Walter Lee (1874–1963); KCMG		Nationalist	MHA for Wilmot (1909–1946)	14 August 1923	25 October 1923	72 days	6 years, 290 days	1916 1919; 1922
49	(Tasmania); TAS	Sir; Walter Lee (1874–1963); KCMG		Nationalist	MHA for Wilmot (1909–1946)	15 March 1934	22 June 1934	99 days	6 years, 290 days	1916 1919; 1922
50	(New South Wales); NSW	William Holman (1871–1934)		Labor	MLA for Cootamundra (1904–1920)	30 June 1913	15 November 1916	3 years, 138 days	6 years, 287 days	1913 1917
50	(New South Wales); NSW	William Holman (1871–1934)		Nationalist	MLA for Cootamundra (1904–1920)	15 November 1916	12 April 1920	3 years, 149 days	6 years, 287 days	1913 1917
51	(Australia); AUS	Stanley Bruce (1883–1967); CH MC PC FRS		Nationalist	MP for Flinders, VIC (1918–1929)	9 February 1923	22 October 1929	6 years, 255 days		1925 1928
52	(Tasmania); TAS	Sir; Elliott Lewis (1858–1935); KCMG		Conservatism	MHA for Richmond (1886–1903)	12 October 1899	9 April 1903	3 years, 179 days	6 years, 188 days	1900 1912
52	(Tasmania); TAS	Sir; Elliott Lewis (1858–1935); KCMG		Commonwealth Liberal	MHA for Denison (1909–1922)	19 June 1909	20 October 1909	123 days	6 years, 188 days	1900 1912
52	(Tasmania); TAS	Sir; Elliott Lewis (1858–1935); KCMG		Commonwealth Liberal	MHA for Denison (1909–1922)	27 October 1909	14 June 1912	2 years, 231 days	6 years, 188 days	1900 1912
53	(South Australia); SA	Charles Kingston (1850–1908)		Non-Party; Liberalism	MP for West Adelaide (1881–1900)	16 June 1893	1 December 1899	6 years, 168 days		1893 1896; 1899
54	(South Australia); SA	Jay Weatherill (1964–)		Labor	MP for Cheltenham (2002–)	21 October 2011	19 March 2018	6 years, 149 days		2014
55	(Northern Territory); NT	Clare Martin (1952–)		Labor	MLA for Fannie Bay (1995–2008)	18 August 2001	26 November 2007	6 years, 100 days		2001 2005
56	(Western Australia); WA	Mark McGowan (1967–)		Labor	MLA for Rockingham (1996–2023)	17 March 2017	8 June 2023	6 years, 83 days		2017 2021
57	(Queensland); QLD	Wayne Goss (1951–2014)		Labor	MP for Logan (1986–1998)	7 December 1989	19 February 1996	6 years, 74 days		1989 1992; 1995
58	(Queensland); QLD	Sir; Robert Herbert (1831–1905); GCB		No Party Alignment	MP for Leichhardt (1860–1863)	10 December 1859	1 February 1866	6 years, 53 days	6 years, 71 days	
58	(Queensland); QLD	Sir; Robert Herbert (1831–1905); GCB		No Party Alignment	MP for West Moreton (1863–1866)	20 July 1866	7 August 1866	18 days	6 years, 71 days	
59	(Victoria (state)); VIC	Sir; Harry Lawson (1875–1952); KCMG		Nationalist	MLA for Castlemaine and Maldon (1904–1927)	21 March 1918	28 April 1924	6 years, 39 days		1920 1921
60	(Western Australia); WA	Albert Hawke (1900–1986)		Labor	MLA for Northam (1933–1968)	23 February 1953	2 April 1959	6 years, 37 days		1953 1956
61	(New South Wales); NSW	Sir; George Reid (1845–1918); GCB GCMG PC KC		Free Trade	MHA for Sydney-King (1894–1901)	3 August 1894	13 September 1899	5 years, 41 days	5 years, 362 days	1894 1895; 1898
61	(Australia); AUS	Sir; George Reid (1845–1918); GCB GCMG PC KC		Free Trade	MP for East Sydney, NSW (1901–1910)	18 August 1904	5 July 1905	321 days	5 years, 362 days	1894 1895; 1898
62	(Tasmania); TAS	Sir; Philip Fysh (1835–1919); KCMG		No Party Alignment	MHA for Buckingham (1884–1894)	9 August 1877	5 March 1878	208 days	5 years, 349 days	
62	(Tasmania); TAS	Sir; Philip Fysh (1835–1919); KCMG		Liberalism	MHA for Buckingham (1884–1894)	30 March 1887	17 August 1892	5 years, 140 days	5 years, 349 days	
63	(Western Australia); WA	Sir; Duncan McLarty (1891–1962); KBE MM		Liberal	MLA for Murray-Wellington (1930–1950); Murray (1950–1962)	1 April 1947	23 February 1953	5 years, 328 days		1947 1950
64	(Queensland); QLD	Edward Hanlon (1887–1952)		Labor	MP for Ithaca (1926–1952)	7 March 1946	16 January 1952	5 years, 315 days		1947 1950
65	(Queensland); QLD	Sir; Thomas McIlwraith (1835–1900); KCMG		Conservative	MP for Mulgrave (1878–1886)	21 January 1879	13 November 1883	4 years, 296 days	5 years, 314 days	1888 1893
65	(Queensland); QLD	Sir; Thomas McIlwraith (1835–1900); KCMG		Conservative	MP for Brisbane North (1888–1896)	13 June 1888	30 November 1888	170 days	5 years, 314 days	1888 1893
65	(Queensland); QLD	Sir; Thomas McIlwraith (1835–1900); KCMG		Ministerial	MP for Brisbane North (1888–1896)	27 March 1893	27 October 1893	214 days	5 years, 314 days	1888 1893
66	(Tasmania); TAS	Will Hodgman (1969–)		Liberal	MHA for Franklin (2002–)	31 March 2014	20 January 2020	5 years, 295 days		2014 2018
67	(Tasmania); TAS	Sir; John McPhee (1878–1952); KCMG		Nationalist	MHA for Denison (1919–1934)	15 June 1928	15 March 1934	5 years, 273 days		1928 1931
68	(New South Wales); NSW	Sir; William McKell (1891–1985); GCMG		Labor	MLA for Redfern (1927–1947)	16 May 1941	6 February 1947	5 years, 266 days		1941 1944
69	(Northern Territory); NT	Michael Gunner (1976–)		Labor	MLA for Fannie Bay (2008–2022)	31 August 2016	13 May 2022	5 years, 255 days		2016 2020
70	(Australian Capital Territory); ACT	Kate Carnell (1955–); AO		Liberal	MLA for Molonglo (1992–2000)	2 March 1995	18 October 2000	5 years, 230 days		1995 1998
71	(Tasmania); TAS	William Giblin (1840–1887)		No Party Alignment	MHA for Wellington (1877–1885)	5 March 1878	20 December 1878	290 days	5 years, 215 days	1882
71	(Tasmania); TAS	William Giblin (1840–1887)		No Party Alignment	MHA for Wellington (1877–1885)	30 October 1879	15 August 1884	4 years, 290 days	5 years, 215 days	1882
72	(Queensland); QLD	Vince Gair (1901–1980)		Labor	MP for South Brisbane (1932–1960)	16 January 1952	24 April 1957	5 years, 98 days	5 years, 208 days	1953 1956
72	(Queensland); QLD	Vince Gair (1901–1980)		Queensland Labor	MP for South Brisbane (1932–1960)	24 April 1957	12 August 1957	110 days	5 years, 208 days	1953 1956
73	(Tasmania); TAS	Jim Bacon (1950–2004); AC		Labor	MHA for Denison (1993–2004)	14 September 1998	21 March 2004	5 years, 189 days		1998 2002
74	(Tasmania); TAS	Sir; Edward Braddon (1829–1904); KCMG		Free Trade	MHA for West Devon (1893–1901)	14 April 1894	12 October 1899	5 years, 181 days		1897
75	(New South Wales); NSW	Sir; James Martin (1820–1886); KCB, QC		No Party Alignment	MLA for Tumut (1863–1864); Lachlan (1864–1869); East Sydney (1869–1872)	16 October 1863	2 February 1865	475 days	5 years, 171 days	
75	(New South Wales); NSW	Sir; James Martin (1820–1886); KCB, QC		No Party Alignment	MLA for Tumut (1863–1864); Lachlan (1864–1869); East Sydney (1869–1872)	22 January 1866	26 October 1868	2 years, 278 days	5 years, 171 days	
75	(New South Wales); NSW	Sir; James Martin (1820–1886); KCB, QC		No Party Alignment	MLA for Tumut (1863–1864); Lachlan (1864–1869); East Sydney (1869–1872)	16 December 1870	13 May 1872	1 year, 149 days	5 years, 171 days	
76	(Victoria (state)); VIC	Sir; George Turner (1851–1916); KCMG PC		Non-Party; Liberalism	MLA for St Kilda (1889–1901)	27 September 1894	5 December 1899	5 years, 69 days	5 years, 154 days	1894 1897; 1900
76	(Victoria (state)); VIC	Sir; George Turner (1851–1916); KCMG PC		Non-Party; Liberalism	MLA for St Kilda (1889–1901)	19 November 1900	12 February 1901	85 days	5 years, 154 days	1894 1897; 1900
77	(Queensland); QLD	Ted Theodore (1884–1950)		Labor	MP for Chillagoe (1912–1925)	22 October 1919	26 February 1925	5 years, 127 days		1920 1923
78	(New South Wales); NSW	James McGirr (1890–1957)		Labor	MLA for Bankstown (1927–1950); Liverpool (1950–1952)	6 February 1947	2 April 1952	5 years, 56 days		1947 1950
79	(Western Australia); WA	Brian Burke (1947–)		Labor	MLA for Balga (1983–1988)	25 February 1983	25 February 1988	5 years, 0 days		1983 1986
80	(Victoria (state)); VIC	Sir; Alexander Peacock (1861–1933); KCMG		Non-Party; Liberalism	MLA for Clunes and Allandale (1889–1904)	12 February 1901	10 June 1902	1 year, 118 days	4 years, 363 days	1914
80	(Victoria (state)); VIC	Sir; Alexander Peacock (1861–1933); KCMG		Commonwealth Liberal	MLA for Allandale (1904–1933)	18 June 1914	17 February 1917	2 years, 244 days	4 years, 363 days	1914
80	(Victoria (state)); VIC	Sir; Alexander Peacock (1861–1933); KCMG		Nationalist	MLA for Allandale (1904–1933)	17 February 1917	30 November 1917	286 days	4 years, 363 days	1914
80	(Victoria (state)); VIC	Sir; Alexander Peacock (1861–1933); KCMG		Nationalist	MLA for Allandale (1904–1933)	28 April 1924	18 July 1924	81 days	4 years, 363 days	1914
81	(Tasmania); TAS	Albert Ogilvie (1890–1939)		Labor	MHA for Franklin (1917–1939)	22 June 1934	10 June 1939	4 years, 353 days		1934 1937
82	(Western Australia); WA	Dr; Geoff Gallop (1951– AC		Labor	MLA for Victoria Park (1986–2006)	16 February 2001	25 January 2006	4 years, 343 days		2001 2005
83	(Tasmania); TAS	Sir; John Evans (1855–1943); CMG		Anti-Socialist	MHA for Kingborough (1897–1909)	12 July 1904	19 June 1909	4 years, 342 days		1906 1909
84	(South Australia); SA	John Olsen (1945–); AO		Liberal	MP for Kavel (1992–2002)	28 November 1996	22 October 2001	4 years, 328 days		1997
85	(Victoria (state)); VIC	Sir; Thomas Bent (1838–1909); KCMG		Non-Party; Conservatism (Electoral Reform)	MLA for Brighton (1900–1909)	16 February 1904	8 January 1909	4 years, 327 days		1904 1907; 1908
86	(Australia); AUS	Alfred Deakin (1856–1919)		Protectionist	MP for Ballaarat, VIC (1901–1913)	24 September 1903	27 April 1904	216 days	4 years, 313 days	1903 1906
86	(Australia); AUS	Alfred Deakin (1856–1919)		Protectionist	MP for Ballaarat, VIC (1901–1913)	5 July 1905	13 November 1908	3 years, 131 days	4 years, 313 days	1903 1906
86	(Australia); AUS	Alfred Deakin (1856–1919)		Commonwealth Liberal	MP for Ballaarat, VIC (1901–1913)	2 June 1909	29 April 1910	331 days	4 years, 313 days	1903 1906
87	(Australia); AUS	Andrew Fisher (1862–1928)		Labor	MP for Wide Bay, QLD (1901–1915)	13 November 1908	2 June 1909	201 days	4 years, 297 days	1910 1914
87	(Australia); AUS	Andrew Fisher (1862–1928)		Labor	MP for Wide Bay, QLD (1901–1915)	29 April 1910	24 June 1913	3 years, 56 days	4 years, 297 days	1910 1914
87	(Australia); AUS	Andrew Fisher (1862–1928)		Labor	MP for Wide Bay, QLD (1901–1915)	17 September 1914	27 October 1915	1 year, 40 days	4 years, 297 days	1910 1914
88	(Western Australia); WA	John Scaddan (1876–1934); CMG		Labor	MLA for Brown Hill-Ivanhoe (1911–1916)	7 October 1911	27 July 1916	4 years, 294 days		1911 1914
89	(Northern Territory); NT	Paul Henderson (1962–)		Labor	MLA for Wanguri (1999–2013)	26 November 2007	29 August 2012	4 years, 277 days		2008
90	(Queensland); QLD	William Kidston (1849–1919)		Labor	MP for Rockhampton (1932–1960)	19 January 1906	18 May 1907	1 year, 119 days	4 years, 262 days	1907 1908; 1909
90	(Queensland); QLD	William Kidston (1849–1919)		Kidston	MP for Rockhampton (1932–1960)	18 May 1907	19 November 1907	185 days	4 years, 262 days	1907 1908; 1909
90	(Queensland); QLD	William Kidston (1849–1919)		Kidston/Liberal	MP for Rockhampton (1932–1960)	18 February 1908	7 February 1911	2 years, 354 days	4 years, 262 days	1907 1908; 1909
91	(Victoria (state)); VIC	Duncan Gillies (1834–1903)		Non-Party; Conservatism	MLA for Rodney (1877–1889); Eastern Suburbs (1889–1894)	18 February 1886	5 November 1890	4 years, 260 days		1886 1889
92	(New South Wales); NSW	Gladys Berejiklian (1970–)		Liberal	MLA for Willoughby (2003–2021)	23 January 2017	5 October 2021	4 years, 255 days		2019
93	(South Australia); SA	Peter Malinauskas (1980–)		Labor	MP for Croydon (2018–)	21 March 2022	Incumbent	4 years, 244 days		2022 2026
94	(New South Wales); NSW	Sir; John Robertson (1816–1891); KCMG		No Party Alignment	MLA for Upper Hunter (1859–1861)	9 March 1860	9 January 1861	306 days	4 years, 242 days	1860 1874; 1877
94	(New South Wales); NSW	Sir; John Robertson (1816–1891); KCMG		No Party Alignment	MLA for Clarence (1866–1869); West Sydney (1869–1877)	27 October 1868	12 January 1870	1 year, 77 days	4 years, 242 days	1860 1874; 1877
94	(New South Wales); NSW	Sir; John Robertson (1816–1891); KCMG		No Party Alignment	MLA for Clarence (1866–1869); West Sydney (1869–1877)	9 February 1875	21 March 1877	2 years, 12 days	4 years, 242 days	1860 1874; 1877
94	(New South Wales); NSW	Sir; John Robertson (1816–1891); KCMG		No Party Alignment	MLA for East Macquarie (1877–1878)	17 August 1877	17 December 1877	122 days	4 years, 242 days	1860 1874; 1877
94	(New South Wales); NSW	Sir; John Robertson (1816–1891); KCMG		No Party Alignment	MLA for Mudgee (1882–1886)	22 December 1885	22 February 1886	62 days	4 years, 242 days	1860 1874; 1877
95	(Tasmania); TAS	Jeremy Rockliff (1970–)		Liberal	MHA for Braddon (2002–)	8 April 2022	Incumbent	4 years, 226 days		2024 2025
96	(Queensland); QLD	Anna Bligh (1960–); AC		Labor	MP for South Brisbane (1995–2012)	13 September 2007	26 March 2012	4 years, 195 days		2009
97	(New South Wales); NSW	Bob Heffron (1890–1978)		Labor	MLA for Maroubra (1950–1968)	23 October 1959	30 April 1964	4 years, 190 days		1962
98	(Australia); AUS	Anthony Albanese (1963–)		Labor	MP for Grayndler (1996–)	23 May 2022	Incumbent	4 years, 181 days		2022 2025
99	(Victoria (state)); VIC	John Cain Snr. (1882–1957)		Labor	MLA for Northcote (1927–1957)	14 September 1943	18 September 1943	4 days	4 years, 175 days	1945 1952
99	(Victoria (state)); VIC	John Cain Snr. (1882–1957)		Labor	MLA for Northcote (1927–1957)	21 November 1945	20 November 1947	1 year, 364 days	4 years, 175 days	1945 1952
99	(Victoria (state)); VIC	John Cain Snr. (1882–1957)		Labor	MLA for Northcote (1927–1957)	17 December 1952	7 June 1955	2 years, 172 days	4 years, 175 days	1945 1952
100	(Queensland); QLD	Sir; Hugh Nelson (1833–1906); KCMG		Ministerial	MP for Murilla (1888–1898)	27 October 1893	13 April 1898	4 years, 168 days		1896
101	(Australia); AUS	Ben Chifley (1885–1951)		Labor	MP for Macquarie, NSW (1940–1951)	13 July 1945	19 December 1949	4 years, 159 days		1946
102	(Queensland); QLD	T. J. Ryan (1876–1921); KC		Labor	MP for Barcoo (1909–1919)	1 June 1915	22 October 1919	4 years, 143 days		1915 1918
103	(Western Australia); WA	Sir; Newton Moore (1870–1936); KCMG VD		Ministerial	MLA for Bunbury (1904–1911)	7 May 1906	16 September 1910	4 years, 132 days		1908
104	(Australian Capital Territory); ACT	Rosemary Follett (1948–); AO		Labor	MLA for Molonglo (1995–1996)	11 May 1989	5 December 1989	208 days	4 years, 122 days	1989 1992
104	(Australian Capital Territory); ACT	Rosemary Follett (1948–); AO		Labor	MLA for Molonglo (1995–1996)	6 June 1991	2 March 1995	3 years, 330 days	4 years, 122 days	1989 1992
105	(Queensland); QLD	Digby Denham (1849–1944)		Liberal	MP for Oxley (1902–1915)	7 February 1911	1 June 1915	4 years, 114 days		1912
106	(New South Wales); NSW	Nick Greiner (1947–); AC		Liberal	MLA for Ku-ring-gai (1980–1992)	25 March 1988	24 June 1992	4 years, 91 days		1988 1991
107	(Australia); AUS	Paul Keating (1944–)		Labor	MP for Blaxland, NSW (1969–1996)	20 December 1991	11 March 1996	4 years, 82 days		1993
108	(Tasmania); TAS	Paul Lennon (1955–); AO		Labor	MHA for Franklin (1989–2008)	21 March 2004	26 May 2008	4 years, 66 days		2006
109	(South Australia); SA	Sir; Henry Ayers (1821–1897); GCMG		No Party Alignment	Member of the Legislative Council (1857–1893)	15 July 1863	4 August 1864	1 year, 20 days	4 years, 34 days	
109	(South Australia); SA	Sir; Henry Ayers (1821–1897); GCMG		No Party Alignment	Member of the Legislative Council (1857–1893)	20 September 1865	23 October 1865	33 days	4 years, 34 days	
109	(South Australia); SA	Sir; Henry Ayers (1821–1897); GCMG		No Party Alignment	Member of the Legislative Council (1857–1893)	3 May 1867	24 September 1868	1 year, 144 days	4 years, 34 days	
109	(South Australia); SA	Sir; Henry Ayers (1821–1897); GCMG		No Party Alignment	Member of the Legislative Council (1857–1893)	13 October 1868	3 November 1868	21 days	4 years, 34 days	
109	(South Australia); SA	Sir; Henry Ayers (1821–1897); GCMG		No Party Alignment	Member of the Legislative Council (1857–1893)	22 January 1872	22 July 1873	1 year, 151 days	4 years, 34 days	
110	(Tasmania); TAS	Ray Groom (1944–); AO		Liberal	MHA for Denison (1986–2001)	17 February 1992	18 March 1996	4 years, 30 days		1992 1996
111	(Queensland); QLD	Sir; Robert Philp (1851–1922); KCMG		Ministerial	MP for Townsville (1888–1912)	17 December 1899	17 September 1903	3 years, 274 days	4 years, 10 days	
111	(Queensland); QLD	Sir; Robert Philp (1851–1922); KCMG		Conservative	MP for Townsville (1888–1912)	19 November 1907	18 February 1908	91 days	4 years, 10 days	
112	(South Australia); SA	Sir; Henry Barwell (1877–1959); KCMG		Liberal Federation	MP for Stanley (1915–1925)	8 April 1920	16 April 1924	4 years, 8 days		1921
113	(South Australia); SA	Steven Marshall (1968–)		Liberal	MP for Norwood (2010–2014); Dunstan (2014–)	19 March 2018	21 March 2022	4 years, 2 days		2018
114	(Victoria (state)); VIC	Edmond Hogan (1883–1964)		Labor	MLA for Warrenheip and Grenville (1927–1945)	20 May 1927	22 November 1928	1 year, 192 days	3 years, 347 days	1927 1929
114	(Victoria (state)); VIC	Edmond Hogan (1883–1964)		Labor	MLA for Warrenheip and Grenville (1927–1945)	12 December 1929	19 May 1932	2 years, 159 days	3 years, 347 days	1927 1929
115	(Tasmania); TAS	Doug Lowe (1942–); AM		Labor	MHA for Franklin (1969–1986)	1 December 1977	11 November 1981	3 years, 345 days		1979
116	(Victoria (state)); VIC	Sir; Graham Berry (1822–1904); KCMG		No Party Alignment	MLA for Geelong West (1869–1877)	7 August 1875	20 October 1875	74 days	3 years, 338 days	1877
116	(Victoria (state)); VIC	Sir; Graham Berry (1822–1904); KCMG		No Party Alignment	MLA for Geelong (1877–1886)	21 May 1877	5 March 1880	2 years, 289 days	3 years, 338 days	1877
116	(Victoria (state)); VIC	Sir; Graham Berry (1822–1904); KCMG		No Party Alignment	MLA for Geelong (1877–1886)	3 August 1880	9 July 1881	340 days	3 years, 338 days	1877
117	(South Australia); SA	Thomas Playford (1837–1915)		No Party Alignment	MP for Newcastle (1887–1890); East Torrens (1890–1894)	11 June 1887	27 June 1889	2 years, 16 days	3 years, 323 days	
117	(South Australia); SA	Thomas Playford (1837–1915)		No Party Alignment	MP for Newcastle (1887–1890); East Torrens (1890–1894)	19 August 1890	21 June 1892	1 year, 307 days	3 years, 323 days	
118	(New South Wales); NSW	Jack Lang (1876–1975)		Labor	MLA for Parramatta (1920–1927)	17 June 1925	18 October 1927	2 years, 123 days	3 years, 317 days	1925 1930
118	(New South Wales); NSW	Jack Lang (1876–1975)		Labor	MLA for Auburn (1927–1946)	4 November 1930	15 October 1931	345 days	3 years, 317 days	1925 1930
118	(New South Wales); NSW	Jack Lang (1876–1975)		Labor (NSW)	MLA for Auburn (1927–1946)	15 October 1931	16 May 1932	214 days	3 years, 317 days	1925 1930
119	(South Australia); SA	Thomas Price (1852–1909)		Labor	MP for Torrens (1902–1909)	26 July 1905	5 June 1909	3 years, 314 days		1905 1906
120	(Tasmania); TAS	James Whyte (1820–1882)		No Party Alignment	MHA for Pembroke (1856–1876)	20 January 1863	24 November 1866	3 years, 308 days		
121	(Queensland); QLD	Arthur Macalister (1818–1883); CMG		No Party Alignment	MP for Ipswich (1860–1868) (1872–1876)	1 February 1866	20 July 1866	169 days	3 years, 296 days	
121	(Queensland); QLD	Arthur Macalister (1818–1883); CMG		No Party Alignment	MP for Ipswich (1860–1868) (1872–1876)	7 August 1866	15 August 1867	1 year, 8 days	3 years, 296 days	
121	(Queensland); QLD	Arthur Macalister (1818–1883); CMG		No Party Alignment	MP for Ipswich (1860–1868) (1872–1876)	8 January 1874	5 June 1876	2 years, 149 days	3 years, 296 days	
122	(South Australia); SA	John Jenkins (1851–1923)		Non-Party; Liberalism	MP for Torrens (1901–1905)	15 May 1901	1 March 1905	3 years, 290 days		1902
123	(Australia); AUS	Scott Morrison (1968–)		Liberal	MP for Cook, NSW (2007–)	24 August 2018	23 May 2022	3 years, 272 days		2019
124	(Australia); AUS	John Curtin (1885–1945)		Labor	MP for Fremantle, WA (1934–1945)	7 October 1941	5 July 1945	3 years, 271 days		1943
125	(Northern Territory); NT	Shane Stone (1950–); AC QC		Country Liberal	MLA for Port Darwin (1990–2000)	26 May 1995	8 February 1999	3 years, 258 days		1997
126	(Queensland); QLD	Sir; Arthur Palmer (1838–1905); KCMG		No Party Alignment	MP for Port Curtis (1866–1878)	3 May 1870	7 January 1874	3 years, 249 days		
127	(New South Wales); NSW	Chris Minns (1979– )		Labor	MP for Kogarah (2015–present)	28 March 2023	Incumbent	3 years, 237 days		2023
128	(Queensland); QLD	William McCormack (1879–1947)		Labor	MP for Cairns (1912–1930)	22 October 1925	21 May 1929	3 years, 211 days		1926
129	(Australian Capital Territory); ACT	Katy Gallagher (1970–)		Labor	MLA for Molonglo (2001–2014)	16 May 2011	11 December 2014	3 years, 209 days		2012
130	(Tasmania); TAS	Sir; Francis Smith (1819–1909)		No Party Alignment	MHA for Fingal (1857–1860)	12 May 1857	1 November 1860	3 years, 173 days		
131	(Queensland); QLD	Frank Cooper (1887–1952)		Labor	MP for Bremer (1915–1946)	16 September 1942	7 March 1946	3 years, 172 days		1944
132	(Northern Territory); NT	Adam Giles (1973–)		Country Liberal	MLA for Braitling (2008–2016)	14 March 2013	31 August 2016	3 years, 170 days		
133	(Western Australia); WA	Roger Cook (1965–)	3 Feb 15 FREO FSH gnangarra-123	Labor	MLA for Kwinana (2008–)	8 June 2023	Incumbent	3 years, 165 days		2025
134	(South Australia); SA	Lionel Hill (1881–1963)		Labor	MP for Port Pirie (1918–1933)	28 August 1926	8 April 1927	223 days	3 years, 160 days	1930
134	(South Australia); SA	Lionel Hill (1881–1963)		Labor	MP for Port Pirie (1918–1933)	17 April 1930	14 August 1931	1 year, 119 days	3 years, 160 days	1930
134	(South Australia); SA	Lionel Hill (1881–1963)		Parliamentary Labor	MP for Port Pirie (1918–1933)	14 August 1931	13 February 1933	1 year, 183 days	3 years, 160 days	1930
135	(Victoria (state)); VIC	Sir; John O'Shanassy (1818–1883); KCMG		No Party Alignment	MLA for Kilmore (1856–1865)	11 March 1857	29 April 1857	49 days	3 years, 140 days	1861
135	(Victoria (state)); VIC	Sir; John O'Shanassy (1818–1883); KCMG		No Party Alignment	MLA for Kilmore (1856–1865)	10 March 1858	27 October 1859	1 year, 231 days	3 years, 140 days	1861
135	(Victoria (state)); VIC	Sir; John O'Shanassy (1818–1883); KCMG		No Party Alignment	MLA for Kilmore (1856–1865)	14 November 1861	27 June 1863	1 year, 225 days	3 years, 140 days	1861
136	(Victoria (state)); VIC	James Service (1823–1899)		No Party Alignment	MLA for Maldon (1874–1881)	5 March 1880	3 August 1880	151 days	3 years, 133 days	1883
136	(Victoria (state)); VIC	James Service (1823–1899)		No Party Alignment	MLA for Castlemaine (1883–1886)	8 March 1883	18 February 1886	2 years, 347 days	3 years, 133 days	1883
137	(Victoria (state)); VIC	John Murray (1851–1916)		Commonwealth Liberal	MLA for Warrnambool (1884–1916)	8 January 1909	18 May 1912	3 years, 131 days		1911
138	(Victoria (state)); VIC	John Brumby (1953–); AO		Labor	MLA for Broadmeadows (1993–2011)	30 July 2007	2 December 2010	3 years, 125 days		
139	(Tasmania); TAS	Sir; James Wilson (1812–1880); KCMG		No Party Alignment	MHA for Hobart (1859–1880)	4 August 1869	4 November 1872	3 years, 92 days		1871
140	(New South Wales); NSW	Sir; John See (1844–1907); KCMG JP		Progressive	MLA for Grafton (1880–1904)	28 March 1901	14 June 1904	3 years, 78 days		1901
141	(Tasmania); TAS	Lara Giddings (1972–)		Labor	MHA for Franklin (2002–)	23 January 2011	31 March 2014	3 years, 67 days		
142	(New South Wales); NSW	Sir; George Fuller (1861–1940); KCMG		Nationalist	MLA for Wollondilly (1920–1927)	20 December 1921	20 December 1921	1 day	3 years, 66 days	1922
142	(New South Wales); NSW	Sir; George Fuller (1861–1940); KCMG		Nationalist	MLA for Wollondilly (1920–1927)	13 April 1922	17 June 1925	3 years, 65 days	3 years, 66 days	1922
143	(Western Australia); WA	John Tonkin (1902–1995); AC		Labor	MLA for Melville (1950–1977)	3 March 1971	8 April 1974	3 years, 65 days		1971
144	(Australia); AUS	John Gorton (1911–2002); GCMG AC CH		Liberal	Senate (VIC) (1950 – 1968); MP for Higgins, VIC (1968 – 1975)	10 January 1968	10 March 1971	3 years, 59 days		1969
145	(South Australia); SA	Dr; David Tonkin (1929–2000); AO		Liberal	MP for Bragg (1970–1983)	18 September 1979	10 November 1982	3 years, 53 days		1979
146	(New South Wales); NSW	Sir; George Dibbs (1834–1904); KCMG		Non-Party; Conservatism	MLA for Murrumbidgee (1885–1894)	7 October 1885	21 December 1885	75 days	3 years, 42 days	1885 1891
146	(New South Wales); NSW	Sir; George Dibbs (1834–1904); KCMG		Protectionist	MLA for Murrumbidgee (1885–1894)	17 January 1889	7 March 1889	49 days	3 years, 42 days	1885 1891
146	(New South Wales); NSW	Sir; George Dibbs (1834–1904); KCMG		Protectionist	MLA for Murrumbidgee (1885–1894)	23 October 1891	2 August 1894	2 years, 283 days	3 years, 42 days	1885 1891
147	(New South Wales); NSW	Sir; Joseph Carruthers (1857–1922); KCMG		Liberal Reform	MLA for St George (1894–1908)	29 August 1904	2 October 1907	3 years, 34 days		1904 1907
148	(New South Wales); NSW	Morris Iemma (1961–)		Labor	MLA for Lakemba (1999–2008)	3 August 2005	5 September 2008	3 years, 33 days		2007
149	(Queensland); QLD	Arthur Moore (1876–1963); CMG		Country and Progressive; National Party	MP for Aubigny (1915–1941)	21 May 1929	17 June 1932	3 years, 27 days		1929
150	(New South Wales); NSW	Barry O'Farrell (1959–)		Liberal	MLA for Ku-ring-gai (1999–2015)	28 March 2011	23 April 2014	3 years, 26 days		2011
151	(New South Wales); NSW	Sir; Thomas Bavin (1874–1941); KCMG KC		Nationalist	MLA for Gordon (1927–1935)	18 October 1927	4 November 1930	3 years, 17 days		1927
152	(South Australia); SA	Sir; James Boucaut (1831–1916); KCMG		No Party Alignment	MP for Encounter Bay (1875–1878)	28 March 1866	3 May 1867	1 year, 36 days	3 years, 10 days	
152	(South Australia); SA	Sir; James Boucaut (1831–1916); KCMG		No Party Alignment	MP for Encounter Bay (1875–1878)	3 June 1875	6 June 1876	1 year, 3 days	3 years, 10 days	
152	(South Australia); SA	Sir; James Boucaut (1831–1916); KCMG		No Party Alignment	MP for Encounter Bay (1875–1878)	26 October 1877	27 September 1878	336 days	3 years, 10 days	
153	(Western Australia); WA	Dr; Carmen Lawrence (1948–)		Labor	MLA for Glendalough (1989–1994)	12 February 1990	16 February 1993	3 years, 4 days		
154	(Australia); AUS	Julia Gillard (1961–); AC		Labor	MP for Lalor, VIC (1998–2013)	24 June 2010	27 June 2013	3 years, 3 days		2010
155	(New South Wales); NSW	Sir; Charles Wade (1863–1922); KCMG KC JP		Liberal Reform	MLA for Gordon (1904–1917)	2 October 1907	1 October 1910	2 years, 364 days		
156	(South Australia); SA	Sir; John Bray (1842–1894); KCMG, JP		No Party Alignment	MP for East Adelaide (1871–1892)	24 June 1881	16 June 1884	2 years, 358 days		
157	(Tasmania); TAS	Alfred Kennerley (1810–1897)		No Party Alignment	MHA for Hobart (1865–1877)	4 August 1873	20 July 1876	2 years, 351 days		
158	(South Australia); SA	Dean Brown (1943–); AO		Liberal	MP for Finniss (1993–2006)	14 December 1993	28 November 1996	2 years, 350 days		1993
159	(Tasmania); TAS	Sir; Angus Bethune (1908–2004)		Liberal	MHA for Wilmot (1946–1975)	26 May 1969	3 May 1972	2 years, 344 days		1969
160	(Australia); AUS	Malcolm Turnbull (1954–)		Liberal	MP for Wentworth, NSW (2004–2018)	15 September 2015	24 August 2018	2 years, 343 days		2016
161	(Australia); AUS	Gough Whitlam (1916–2014); AC QC		Labor	MP for Werriwa, NSW (1952–1978)	5 December 1972	11 November 1975	2 years, 341 days		1972 1974
162	(Queensland); QLD	Campbell Newman (1963–)		Liberal National	MP for Ashgrove (2012–2015)	26 March 2012	14 February 2015	2 years, 325 days		2012
163	(Victoria (state)); VIC	Sir; Stanley Argyle (1867–1940); KBE		United Australia	MLA for Toorak (1920–1940)	19 May 1932	2 April 1935	2 years, 318 days		1932 1935
164	(Victoria (state)); VIC	Jacinta Allan (1973–)		Labor	MLA for Bendigo East (1999- )	27 September 2023	28 July 2026	2 years, 304 days		
165	(Australia); AUS	Kevin Rudd (1957–)		Labor	MP for Griffith, QLD (1998–2013)	3 December 2007	24 June 2010	2 years, 203 days	2 years, 286 days	2007
165	(Australia); AUS	Kevin Rudd (1957–)		Labor	MP for Griffith, QLD (1998–2013)	27 June 2013	18 September 2013	83 days	2 years, 286 days	2007
166	(New South Wales); NSW	John Fahey (1945–2020); AC		Liberal	MLA for Macarthur (1996–2001)	24 June 1992	4 April 1995	2 years, 284 days		
167	(New South Wales); NSW	Sir; Alexander Stuart (1824–1886); KCMG		No Party Alignment	MLA for Illawarra (1880–1885)	4 January 1883	7 October 1885	2 years, 276 days		
168	(New South Wales); NSW	Mike Baird (1968–)		Liberal	MLA for Manly (2007–2017)	17 April 2014	23 January 2017	2 years, 275 days		2015
169	(South Australia); SA	Sir; William Morgan (1828–1883); KCMG		No Party Alignment	Member of the Legislative Council (1867–1884)	27 September 1878	24 June 1881	2 years, 270 days		
170	(Northern Territory); NT	Goff Letts (1928–2023); CBE AM		Country Liberal	MLA for Victoria River (1974–1977)	19 October 1974	13 August 1977	2 years, 267 days		1974 1977
171	(Australia); AUS	Sir Edmund Barton (1849–1920); GCMG KC		Protectionist	MP for Hunter, NSW (1901–1903)	1 January 1901	24 September 1903	2 years, 266 days		1901
172	(South Australia); SA	Sir; Arthur Blyth (1823–1891); KCMG CB		No Party Alignment	MP for Gumeracha (1857–1868)	4 August 1864	22 March 1865	230 days	2 years, 254 days	
172	(South Australia); SA	Sir; Arthur Blyth (1823–1891); KCMG CB		No Party Alignment	MP for Gumeracha (1870–1875)	10 November 1871	22 January 1872	73 days	2 years, 254 days	
172	(South Australia); SA	Sir; Arthur Blyth (1823–1891); KCMG CB		No Party Alignment	MP for Gumeracha (1870–1875)	22 July 1873	3 June 1875	1 year, 316 days	2 years, 254 days	
173	(Tasmania); TAS	Sir; Richard Dry (1815–1869); KCMG		No Party Alignment	MHA for Tamar (1862–1869)	24 November 1866	4 August 1869	2 years, 253 days		1866 1869
174	(New South Wales); NSW	James McGowen (1855–1922); JP		Labor	MLA for Redfern (1891–1917)	21 October 1910	29 June 1913	2 years, 251 days		1910
175	(Tasmania); TAS	Bill Neilson (1925–1989); AC		Labor	MHA for Franklin (1941–1977)	31 March 1975	1 December 1977	2 years, 245 days		1976
176	(Tasmania); TAS	David Bartlett (1968–)		Labor	MHA for Denison (2004–2011)	26 May 2008	24 January 2011	2 years, 243 days		2010
177	(Western Australia); WA	Alan Carpenter (1957–)		Labor	MLA for Willagee (1996–2009)	25 January 2006	23 September 2008	2 years, 242 days		
178	(South Australia); SA	Sir; John Downer (1843–1915); KCMG, QC		No Party Alignment	MP for Barossa (1878–1901)	16 June 1885	11 June 1887	1 year, 360 days	2 years, 239 days	
178	(South Australia); SA	Sir; John Downer (1843–1915); KCMG, QC		Non-Party; Conservatism	MP for Barossa (1878–1901)	15 October 1892	16 June 1893	244 days	2 years, 239 days	
179	(Tasmania); TAS	Michael Field (1948–); AC		Labor	MHA for Braddon (1975–1997)	29 June 1989	17 February 1992	2 years, 233 days		1989
180	(Victoria (state)); VIC	Thomas Hollway (1906–1971)		Liberal	MLA for Ballarat (1932–1952)	20 November 1947	22 March 1949	1 year, 122 days	2 years, 222 days	1947 1950
180	(Victoria (state)); VIC	Thomas Hollway (1906–1971)		Liberal & Country	MLA for Ballarat (1932–1952)	22 March 1949	27 June 1950	1 year, 97 days	2 years, 222 days	1947 1950
180	(Victoria (state)); VIC	Thomas Hollway (1906–1971)		Electoral Reform	MLA for Ballarat (1932–1952)	28 October 1952	31 October 1952	3 days	2 years, 222 days	1947 1950
181	(South Australia); SA	Sir; Richard Hanson (1805–1876)		No Party Alignment	MP for Adelaide (1857–1861)	30 September 1857	8 May 1860	2 years, 221 days		
182	(Northern Territory); NT	Denis Burke (1948–)		Country Liberal	MLA for Brennan (1994–2005)	8 February 1999	18 August 2001	2 years, 191 days		
183	(Victoria (state)); VIC	John Allan (1866–1936)		Country	MLA for Rodney (1917–1936)	18 November 1924	20 May 1927	2 years, 183 days		
184	(Tasmania); TAS	Tony Rundle (1939–2025); AO		Liberal	MHA for Braddon (1982–2002)	18 March 1996	14 September 1998	2 years, 180 days		
185	(Victoria (state)); VIC	Sir; John McDonald (1898–1977)		Country	MLA for Shepparton (1945–1955)	27 June 1950	28 October 1952	2 years, 123 days	2 years, 170 days	
185	(Victoria (state)); VIC	Sir; John McDonald (1898–1977)		Country	MLA for Shepparton (1945–1955)	31 October 1952	17 December 1952	47 days	2 years, 170 days	
186	(Victoria (state)); VIC	Dr; William Haines (1810–1866)		No Party Alignment	MLA for South Grant (1856–1858)	30 November 1855	11 March 1857	1 year, 101 days	2 years, 149 days	1856
186	(Victoria (state)); VIC	Dr; William Haines (1810–1866)		No Party Alignment	MLA for South Grant (1856–1858)	29 April 1857	10 March 1858	315 days	2 years, 149 days	1856
187	(South Australia); SA	Sir; John Colton (1823–1902); KCMG		No Party Alignment	MP for Noarlunga (1875–1878) (1889–1887)	6 June 1876	26 October 1877	1 year, 142 days	2 years, 142 days	
187	(South Australia); SA	Sir; John Colton (1823–1902); KCMG		No Party Alignment	MP for Noarlunga (1875–1878) (1889–1887)	16 June 1884	16 June 1885	1 year, 0 days	2 years, 142 days	
188	(South Australia); SA	John Gunn (1884–1959)		Labor	MP for Adelaide (1918–1926)	16 April 1924	28 August 1926	2 years, 134 days		1924
189	(Queensland); QLD	Rob Borbidge (1954–); AO		National	MP for Surfers Paradise (1980–2001)	19 February 1996	26 June 1998	2 years, 127 days		
190	(Queensland); QLD	Sir; Arthur Morgan (1856–1916)		Ministerial	MP for Warwick (1898–1906)	17 September 1903	19 January 1906	2 years, 124 days		1904
191	(South Australia); SA	Crawford Vaughan (1874–1947)		Labor	MP for Sturt (1915–1918)	3 April 1915	13 February 1917	1 year, 316 days	2 years, 102 days	1915
191	(South Australia); SA	Crawford Vaughan (1874–1947)		National Labor	MP for Sturt (1915–1918)	13 February 1917	14 July 1917	151 days	2 years, 102 days	1915
192	(Victoria (state)); VIC	Ted Baillieu (1953–)		Liberal	MLA for Hawthorn (1999–2014)	2 December 2010	6 March 2013	2 years, 94 days		2010
193	(Northern Territory); NT	Lia Finocchiaro (1984–)		Country Liberal	MLA for Spillett (2016–)	28 August 2024	Incumbent	2 years, 84 days		2024
194	(South Australia); SA	Frank Walsh (1897–1968)		Labor	MP for Edwardstown (1956–1968)	10 March 1965	1 June 1967	2 years, 83 days		1965
195	(Tasmania); TAS	Peter Gutwein (1964–)		Liberal	MHA for Bass (2002–2022)	20 January 2020	8 April 2022	2 years, 78 days		2021
196	(Australia); AUS	James Scullin (1876–1953)		Labor	MP for Yarra, VIC (1922–1949)	22 October 1929	6 January 1932	2 years, 76 days		1929 -
197	(Northern Territory); NT	Stephen Hatton (1948–)		Country Liberal	MLA for Nightcliff (1983–2001)	13 May 1986	13 July 1988	2 years, 61 days		1987 -
198	(Victoria (state)); VIC	Joan Kirner (1938–2015); AC		Labor	MLA for Williamstown (1988–1994)	10 August 1990	6 October 1992	2 years, 57 days		
199	(Victoria (state)); VIC	James Francis (1819–1884)		No Party Alignment	MLA for Richmond (1859–1874)	10 June 1872	31 July 1874	2 years, 51 days		
200	(South Australia); SA	Steele Hall (1928–2024)		Liberal & Country League	MP for Gouger (1959–1973)	17 April 1968	2 June 1970	2 years, 46 days		1968
201	(Western Australia); WA	Sir; Walter James (1863–1943); KCMG KC		Opposition	MLA for East Perth (1894–1904)	1 July 1902	10 August 1904	2 years, 40 days		
202	(Queensland); QLD	David Crisafulli (1979–)		Liberal National	MP for Mundingburra (2012–2015); Broadwater (2017–)	28 October 2024	Incumbent	2 years, 23 days		2024
203	(Victoria (state)); VIC	William Watt (1871–1946); PC		Commonwealth Liberal	MLA for Essendon (1904–1914)	18 May 1912	9 December 1913	1 year, 205 days	2 years, 18 days	
203	(Victoria (state)); VIC	William Watt (1871–1946); PC		Commonwealth Liberal	MLA for Essendon (1904–1914)	22 December 1913	18 June 1914	178 days	2 years, 18 days	
204	(Tasmania); TAS	John Earle (1865–1932)		Labor	MHA for Franklin (1909–1917)	20 October 1909	27 October 1909	7 days	2 years, 16 days	
204	(Tasmania); TAS	John Earle (1865–1932)		Labor	MHA for Franklin (1909–1917)	6 April 1914	15 April 1916	2 years, 9 days	2 years, 16 days	
205	(Australia); AUS	Tony Abbott (1957–)		Liberal	MP for Warringah, NSW (1994–2019)	18 September 2013	15 September 2015	1 year, 362 days		2013
206	(Western Australia); WA	Frank Wilson (1859–1918); CMG		Nationalist	MLA for Sussex (1904–1917)	16 September 1910	7 October 1911	1 year, 21 days	1 year, 357 days	
206	(Western Australia); WA	Frank Wilson (1859–1918); CMG		Liberal (WA)	MLA for Sussex (1904–1917)	27 July 1916	28 June 1917	336 days	1 year, 357 days	
207	(Western Australia); WA	Peter Dowding (1943–); SC		Labor	MLA for Maylands (1986–1990)	25 February 1988	12 February 1990	1 year, 352 days		1989
208	(South Australia); SA	John Hart (1809–1873)		No Party Alignment	MP for Port Adelaide (1862–1866); Light (1868–1870); The Burra (1870–1873)	23 October 1865	28 March 1866	156 days	1 year, 339 days	
208	(South Australia); SA	John Hart (1809–1873)		No Party Alignment	MP for Port Adelaide (1862–1866); Light (1868–1870); The Burra (1870–1873)	24 September 1868	13 October 1868	19 days	1 year, 339 days	
208	(South Australia); SA	John Hart (1809–1873)		No Party Alignment	MP for Port Adelaide (1862–1866); Light (1868–1870); The Burra (1870–1873)	30 May 1870	10 November 1871	1 year, 164 days	1 year, 339 days	
209	(Australia); AUS	Harold Holt (1908–1967); CH		Liberal	MP for Higgins, VIC (1949–1967)	26 January 1966	19 December 1967	1 year, 327 days		1966
210	(Queensland); QLD	John Douglas (1828–1904); CMG		No Party Alignment	MP for Maryborough (1875–1880)	8 March 1877	21 January 1879	1 year, 319 days		1878
211	(Queensland); QLD	Mike Ahern (1942–2023); AO FTSE		National	MP for Landsborough (1968–1990)	1 December 1987	25 September 1989	1 year, 298 days		
212	(Tasmania); TAS	Albert Solomon (1876–1914)		Commonwealth Liberal	MHA for Bass (1909–1914)	14 June 1912	6 April 1914	1 year, 296 days		1913
213	(Western Australia); WA	Sir; Henry Lefroy (1854–1930); KCMG		Nationalist	MLA for Moore (1911–1921)	28 June 1917	17 April 1919	1 year, 293 days		1917
214	(New South Wales); NSW	Alexander Mair (1889–1969)		United Australia	MLA for Albury (1932–1946)	5 August 1939	16 May 1941	1 year, 284 days		
215	(South Australia); SA	Sir; Frederick Holder (1850–1909); KCMG		No Party Alignment	MP for Burra (1887–1901)	21 June 1892	15 October 1892	116 days	1 year, 274 days	
215	(South Australia); SA	Sir; Frederick Holder (1850–1909); KCMG		Non-Party; Liberalism	MP for Burra (1887–1901)	8 December 1899	15 May 1901	1 year, 158 days	1 year, 274 days	
216	(Victoria (state)); VIC	Denis Napthine (1952–)		Liberal	MLA for South-West Coast (2002–2015)	6 March 2013	4 December 2014	1 year, 273 days		
217	(Australia); AUS	William McMahon (1908–1988); GCMG CH		Liberal	MP for Lowe, NSW (1949–1982)	10 March 1971	5 December 1972	1 year, 270 days		
218	(South Australia); SA	George Waterhouse (1824–1906)		No Party Alignment	Member of the Legislative Council (1860–1864)	8 October 1861	4 July 1863	1 year, 269 days		
219	(New South Wales); NSW	Barrie Unsworth (1934–)		Labor	MLA for Rockdale (1986–1991)	4 July 1986	25 March 1988	1 year, 265 days		
220	(South Australia); SA	John Verran (1856–1932)		Labor	MP for Wallaroo (1901–1918)	3 June 1910	17 February 1912	1 year, 259 days		1910
221	(Queensland); QLD	Boyd Morehead (1843–1905)		Conservative	MP for Balonne (1883–1896)	30 November 1888	12 August 1890	1 year, 255 days		
222	(Victoria (state)); VIC	Sir; William Irvine (1858–1943); GCMG		Non-Party; Conservatism (Electoral Reform)	MLA for Lowan (1894–1906)	10 June 1902	16 February 1904	1 year, 251 days		1902
223	(Victoria (state)); VIC	Sir; James Patterson (1833–1895); KCMG		Non-Party; Conservatism	MLA for Castlemaine (1870–1895)	23 January 1893	27 September 1894	1 year, 247 days		
224	(Western Australia); WA	Frank Wise (1897–1986); AO		Labor	MLA for Gascoyne (1933–1951)	31 July 1945	1 April 1947	1 year, 244 days		
225	(Victoria (state)); VIC	Sir; Bryan O'Loghlen (1828–1905); Bt		No Party Alignment	MLA for West Bourke (1880–1883)	9 July 1881	8 March 1883	1 year, 242 days		
226	(Tasmania); TAS	Henry Dobson (1841–1918)		Conservatism	MHA for Brighton (1891–1900)	17 August 1892	14 April 1894	1 year, 240 days		1893
227	(Northern Territory); NT	Natasha Fyles (1978–)		Labor	MLA for Nightcliff (2012–2024)	13 May 2022	21 December 2023	1 year, 222 days		
228	(South Australia); SA	Henry Strangways (1832–1920)		No Party Alignment	MP for West Torrens (1862–1871)	3 November 1868	30 May 1870	1 year, 208 days		
229	(Northern Territory); NT	Ian Tuxworth (1942–2020)		Country Liberal	MLA for Barkly (1974–1990)	17 October 1984	10 May 1986	1 year, 205 days		
230	(Tasmania); TAS	Sir; Adye Douglas (1815–1906)		No Party Alignment	MHA for Fingal (1872–1884)	15 August 1884	8 March 1886	1 year, 205 days		
231	(New South Wales); NSW	Sir; William Lyne (1844–1913); KCMG		Protectionist	MLA for Hume (1880–1901)	14 September 1899	27 March 1901	1 year, 194 days		
232	(Australian Capital Territory); ACT	Trevor Kaine (1928–2008)		Liberal	MLA for Brindabella (1995–2001)	5 December 1989	6 June 1991	1 year, 183 days		
233	(New South Wales); NSW	John Storey (1869–1921)		Labor	MLA for Balmain (1907–1921)	13 April 1920	5 October 1921	1 year, 175 days		1920
234	(New South Wales); NSW	Dominic Perrottet (1982–)		Liberal	MP for Epping (2019–2024)	5 October 2021	28 March 2023	1 year, 174 days		
235	(Tasmania); TAS	Thomas Chapman (1815–1884)		No Party Alignment	MHA for Queensborough (1861–1862); Campbell Town (1862–1864)	2 August 1861	20 January 1863	1 year, 171 days		1861
236	(Queensland); QLD	Sir; Charles Lilley (1827–1897)		No Party Alignment	MP for Fortitude Valley (1860–1874)	25 November 1868	2 May 1870	1 year, 158 days		
237	(South Australia); SA	Thomas Reynolds (1818–1875)		No Party Alignment	MP for City of Adelaide (1860–1862)	9 May 1860	8 October 1861	1 year, 152 days		
238	(New South Wales); NSW	Kristina Keneally (1968–)		Labor	MLA for Heffron (2003–2012)	4 December 2009	28 March 2011	1 year, 114 days		
239	(Victoria (state)); VIC	James Munro (1832–1908)		Non-Party; Liberalism (National Liberal)	MLA for Geelong (1886–1892)	5 November 1890	16 February 1892	1 year, 103 days		
240	(Queensland); QLD	Sir; Robert Mackenzie (1811–1873); Bt		No Party Alignment	MP for Burnett (1860–1869)	15 August 1867	25 November 1868	1 year, 102 days		
241	(South Australia); SA	Lynn Arnold (1949–); AO		Labor	MP for Ramsay (1985–1993)	4 September 1992	14 December 1993	1 year, 101 days		
242	(Tasmania); TAS	William Propsting (1861–1937); CMG		Conservatism	MHA for North Hobart (1903–1906)	9 April 1903	11 July 1904	1 year, 93 days		
243	(New South Wales); NSW	Nathan Rees (1968–)		Labor	MLA for Toongabbie (2007–2015)	5 September 2008	4 December 2009	1 year, 90 days		
244	(Australia); AUS	Joseph Cook (1860–1947); GCMG PC		Commonwealth Liberal	MP for Parramatta, NSW (1901–1921)	24 June 1913	17 September 1914	1 year, 85 days		1913
245	(Queensland); QLD	Sir; James Dickson (1832–1901); KCMG		Ministerial	MP for Bulimba (1892–1901)	1 October 1898	1 December 1899	1 year, 61 days		1899
246	(South Australia); SA	Sir; John Cockburn (1850–1929); KCMG		No Party Alignment	MP for Mount Barker (1887–1898)	27 June 1889	19 August 1890	1 year, 53 days		1890
247	(Western Australia); WA	Ray O'Connor (1926–2013)		Liberal	MLA for Mount Lawley (1962–1984)	25 January 1982	25 February 1983	1 year, 31 days		
248	(Victoria (state)); VIC	William Nicholson (1816–1865)		No Party Alignment	MLA for Sandridge (1859–1864)	27 October 1859	26 November 1860	1 year, 30 days		1859
249	(Tasmania); TAS	Sir; James Agnew (1815–1901); KCMG		No Party Alignment	MLC for Macquarie (1886–1887)	8 March 1886	29 March 1887	1 year, 21 days		
250	(Tasmania); TAS	Thomas Reibey (1821–1912)		No Party Alignment	MHA for Westbury (1874–1903)	20 July 1876	9 August 1877	1 year, 20 days		
251	(Victoria (state)); VIC	Sir; William McPherson (1865–1932); KBE		Nationalist	MLA for Hawthorn (1913–1930)	22 November 1928	12 December 1929	1 year, 20 days		
252	(New South Wales); NSW	Tom Lewis (1922–2016); AO		Liberal	MLA for Wollondilly (1957–1978)	3 January 1975	23 January 1976	1 year, 20 days		
253	(Australian Capital Territory); ACT	Gary Humphries (1958–)		Liberal	MLA for Molonglo (1995–2002)	18 October 2000	5 November 2001	1 year, 18 days		
254	(Western Australia); WA	Henry Daglish (1866–1920)		Labor	MLA for Subiaco (1901–1911)	10 August 1904	25 August 1905	1 year, 15 days		
255	(New South Wales); NSW	Jack Renshaw (1909–1987); AC		Labor	MLA for Castlereagh (1941–1980)	30 April 1964	13 May 1965	1 year, 13 days		
256	(Victoria (state)); VIC	George Kerferd (1831–1889)		No Party Alignment	MLA for Ovens (1864–1886)	31 July 1874	7 August 1875	1 year, 7 days		1874
257	(New South Wales); NSW	James Farnell (1825–1888)		No Party Alignment	MLA for St Leonards (1874–1882)	18 December 1877	20 December 1878	1 year, 2 days		
258	(Tasmania); TAS	John Hayes (1868–1956)		Nationalist	MHA for Bass (1913–1923)	12 August 1922	14 August 1923	1 year, 2 days		
259	(Western Australia); WA	George Leake (1856–1902); CMG KC		Oppositionist	MLA for West Perth (1901–1902)	27 May 1901	21 November 1901	178 days	361 days	1901
259	(Western Australia); WA	George Leake (1856–1902); CMG KC		Oppositionist	MLA for West Perth (1901–1902)	23 December 1901	24 June 1902	183 days	361 days	1901
260	(Victoria (state)); VIC	Sir; Charles Gavan Duffy (1816–1903); KCMG		No Party Alignment	MLA for Dalhousie (1867–1874)	19 June 1871	10 June 1872	357 days		1871
261	(Victoria (state)); VIC	Richard Heales (1822–1864)		No Party Alignment	MLA for East Bourke Boroughs (1859–1864)	26 November 1860	14 November 1861	353 days		1859
262	(Victoria (state)); VIC	Allan McLean (1840–1911)		Non-Party; Liberalism	MLA for Gippsland North (1880–1901)	5 December 1899	19 November 1900	349 days		1892
263	(Victoria (state)); VIC	William Shiels (1848–1904)		Non-Party; Liberalism	MLA for Normanby (1880–1904)	16 February 1892	23 January 1893	342 days		1892
264	(New South Wales); NSW	Sir; Henry Parker (1808–1881); KCMG		No Party Alignment	MLA for Parramatta (1856–1857)	3 October 1856	7 September 1857	339 days		
265	(New South Wales); NSW	Sir; Patrick Jennings (1831–1897); KCMG		Non-Party; Conservatism	MLA for The Bogan (1880–1887)	26 February 1886	19 January 1887	327 days		
266	(Queensland); QLD	Steven Miles (1977–)		Labor	MP for Murrumba (2017–)	15 December 2023	28 October 2024	318 days		
267	(Tasmania); TAS	Dr; William Crowther (1817–1885); FRCS		No Party Alignment	MHA for Hobart (1866–1885)	20 December 1878	29 October 1879	313 days		
268	(Victoria (state)); VIC	Lindsay Thompson (1923–2008); AO CMG		Liberal	MLA for Malvern (1970–1982)	5 June 1981	8 April 1982	307 days		
269	(South Australia); SA	Boyle Travers Finniss (1807–1893)		No Party Alignment	MP for Adelaide (1857–1860)	24 October 1856	21 August 1857	301 days		
270	(Tasmania); TAS	William Weston (1804–1888)		No Party Alignment	MHA for Ringwood (1856–1857); MLC for Longford (1857-1861)	25 April 1857	12 May 1857	17 days	291 days	
270	(Tasmania); TAS	William Weston (1804–1888)		No Party Alignment	MHA for Ringwood (1856–1857); MLC for Longford (1857-1861)	1 November 1860	2 August 1861	274 days	291 days	
271	(Queensland); QLD	George Thorn (1838–1905)		No Party Alignment	MP for Ipswich (1876–1878)	5 June 1876	8 March 1877	276 days		
272	(Tasmania); TAS	Frederick Innes (1816–1882)		No Party Alignment	MHA for Selby (1872–1873)	4 November 1872	4 August 1873	273 days		
273	(Western Australia); WA	Sir; Hector Rason (1858–1927)		Ministerial	MLA for Guildford (1901–1906)	25 August 1905	7 May 1906	255 days		1905
274	(Northern Territory); NT	Eva Lawler (1962–)		Labor	MLA for Drysdale (2016-2024)	21 December 2023	28 August 2024	251 days		
275	(Queensland); QLD	William Gillies (1868–1928)		Labor	MP for Eacham (1912–1925)	26 February 1925	22 October 1925	238 days		
276	(Queensland); QLD	Jack Pizzey (1911–1968)		Country	MP for Isis (1950–1968)	17 January 1968	31 July 1968	227 days		
277	(South Australia); SA	Des Corcoran (1928–2004); AO		Labor	MP for Hartley (1977–1982)	15 February 1979	18 September 1979	215 days		
278	(Victoria (state)); VIC	John MacPherson (1833–1894)		No Party Alignment	MLA for Dundas (1866–1878)	20 September 1869	9 April 1870	201 days		
279	(Northern Territory); NT	Terry Mills (1957–)		Country Liberal	MLA for Blain (1999–2014, 2016–2020)	29 August 2012	14 March 2013	197 days		2012
280	(Tasmania); TAS	Harry Holgate (1933–1997); AO		Labor	MHA for Bass (1974–1992)	11 November 1981	26 May 1982	196 days		
281	(South Australia); SA	Francis Dutton (1818–1877); CMG		No Party Alignment	MP for Light (1862–1865)	4 July 1863	15 July 1863	11 days	193 days	
281	(South Australia); SA	Francis Dutton (1818–1877); CMG		No Party Alignment	MP for Light (1862–1865)	22 March 1865	20 September 1865	182 days	193 days	
282	(Tasmania); TAS	Edmund Dwyer-Gray (1870–1945)		Labor	MHA for Denison (1928–1945)	11 June 1939	18 December 1939	190 days		
283	(New South Wales); NSW	James Dooley (1877–1950)		Labor	MLA for Hartley (1907–1920); Bathurst (1920–1927)	5 October 1921	20 December 1921	76 days	190 days	
283	(New South Wales); NSW	James Dooley (1877–1950)		Labor	MLA for Hartley (1907–1920); Bathurst (1920–1927)	20 December 1921	13 April 1922	114 days	190 days	
284	(Queensland); QLD	Thomas Byrnes (1860–1898)		Ministerial	MP for Warwick (1896–1898)	13 April 1898	27 September 1898	167 days		
285	(South Australia); SA	Sir; Richard Butler (1850–1925)		Non-Party; Conservatism	MP for Barossa (1902–1924)	1 March 1905	26 July 1905	147 days		
286	(New South Wales); NSW	William Forster (1818–1882)		No Party Alignment	MLA for Queanbeyan (1859–1860)	27 October 1859	9 March 1860	134 days		1859
287	(South Australia); SA	Rob Kerin (1954–)		Liberal	MP for Frome (1993–2008)	22 October 2001	5 March 2002	134 days		
288	(Victoria (state)); VIC	George Prendergast (1854–1937)		Labor	MLA for North Melbourne (1900–1927)	18 July 1924	18 November 1924	123 days		
289	(Tasmania); TAS	William Champ (1808–1892)		No Party Alignment	MHA for Launceston (1856–1857)	1 November 1856	26 February 1857	117 days		
290	(Victoria (state)); VIC	Ben Carroll (1975–)		Labor	MLA for Niddrie (2012- )	28 July 2026	Incumbent	115 days		
291	(Australia); AUS	Chris Watson (1867–1941)		Labor	MP for Bland, NSW (1901–1906)	27 April 1904	18 August 1904	113 days		
292	(New South Wales); NSW	Sir; Eric Willis (1922–1999); KBE CMG		Liberal	MLA for Earlwood (1950–1978)	23 January 1976	14 May 1976	112 days		
293	(Victoria (state)); VIC	Sir; John Bowser (1856–1936)		Nationalist	MLA for Wangaratta (1904–1927)	29 November 1917	21 March 1918	112 days		1917
294	(Western Australia); WA	George Throssell (1840–1910); CMG		Pro-Forrest	MLA for Northam (1890–1904)	15 February 1901	27 May 1901	101 days		
295	(New South Wales); NSW	Sir; Stuart Donaldson (1812–1867)		No Party Alignment	MLA for Sydney Hamlets (1856)	6 June 1856	25 August 1856	80 days		1856
296	(New South Wales); NSW	Thomas Waddell (1854–1940)		Progressive	MLA for Cowra (1898–1904)	15 June 1904	29 August 1904	75 days		
297	(Queensland); QLD	Russell Cooper (1941–); AM		National	MP for Roma (1983–1992)	25 September 1989	7 December 1989	73 days		
298	(Tasmania); TAS	Edward Brooker (1891–1948)		Labor	MHA for Franklin (1934–1948)	19 December 1947	24 February 1948	67 days		
299	(Victoria (state)); VIC	Sir; Charles Sladen (1816–1884); KCMG		No Party Alignment	MLC for Western (1864–1868)	6 May 1868	11 July 1868	66 days		
300	(South Australia); SA	Robert Richards (1885–1967)		Parliamentary Labor	MP for Wallaroo (1918–1949)	13 February 1933	18 April 1933	64 days		
301	(Tasmania); TAS	Thomas Gregson (1796–1874)		No Party Alignment	MHA for Richmond (1856–1872)	26 February 1857	25 April 1857	58 days		
302	(Victoria (state)); VIC	Ian Macfarlan (1881–1964)		Liberal	MLA for Brighton (1928–1945)	2 October 1945	21 November 1945	50 days		
303	(Australia); AUS	Arthur Fadden (1894–1973); GCMG PC		Country	MP for Darling Downs, QLD (1936–1949)	29 August 1941	7 October 1941	39 days		
304	(Western Australia); WA	Alf Morgans (1850–1933)		Ministerial	MLA for Coolgardie (1897–1904)	21 November 1901	23 December 1901	32 days		
305	(Western Australia); WA	Sir; Hal Colebatch (1872–1953); CMG		Nationalist	Member of the Legislative Council (1912–1923)	17 April 1919	17 May 1919	30 days		
306	(South Australia); SA	Sir; Robert Torrens (1814–1884); GCMG		No Party Alignment	MP for Adelaide (1857–1858)	1 September 1857	30 September 1857	29 days		
307	(Australia); AUS	John McEwen (1900–1980); GCMG CH		Country	MP for Murray, VIC (1949–1971)	19 December 1967	10 January 1968	22 days		
308	(Australia); AUS	Sir Earle Page (1880–1961); GCMG CH		Country	MP for Cowper, NSW (1919–1961)	7 April 1939	26 April 1939	19 days		
309	(Victoria (state)); VIC	George Elmslie (1861–1918)		Labor	MLA for Albert Park (1902–1918)	9 December 1913	22 December 1913	13 days		
310	(South Australia); SA	John Baker (1813–1872)		No Party Alignment	Member of the Legislative Council (1857–1861)	21 August 1857	1 September 1857	11 days		
311	(Queensland); QLD	Sir; Gordon Chalk (1913–1991); KBE		Liberal	MP for Lockyer (1950–1976)	1 August 1968	8 August 1968	7 days		
312	(Australia); AUS	Frank Forde (1890–1983)		Labor	MP for Capricornia, QLD (1922–1946)	6 July 1945	13 July 1945	7 days		
313	(South Australia); SA	Vaiben Louis Solomon (1853–1908)		Non-Party; Conservatism	MP for Northern Territory (1891–1901)	1 December 1899	8 December 1899	7 days		
314	(Queensland); QLD	Anderson Dawson (1863–1910)		Labor	MP for Charters Towers (1893–1901)	1 December 1899	7 December 1899	6 days		

== See also ==
- Premier of New South Wales
  - List of premiers of New South Wales by time in office
- Premier of Queensland
  - List of premiers of Queensland by time in office
- Premier of South Australia
  - List of premiers of South Australia by time in office
- Premier of Tasmania
  - List of premiers of Tasmania by time in office
- Premier of Victoria
  - List of premiers of Victoria by time in office
- Premier of Western Australia
  - List of premiers of Western Australia by time in office
- Chief Minister of the Northern Territory
  - List of chief ministers of the Northern Territory by time in office
- Chief Minister of the Australian Capital Territory
  - List of chief ministers of the Australian Capital Territory by time in office
- Prime Minister of Australia
  - List of prime ministers of Australia by time in office
- List of longest-serving members of the Parliament of Australia
