= Henry Mundy =

Henry Mundy may refer to:

- Henry Mundy (portraitist) (1798–1848), English pioneer settler and portraitist in the colony of Van Diemen's Land
- Henry Mundy (abstract painter) (1919–2019), English abstract painter and teacher

== See also ==
- Henry Munday (1623–1682), English physician and schoolmaster
