= Alexander Clerke =

Australian politician (1804–1877)

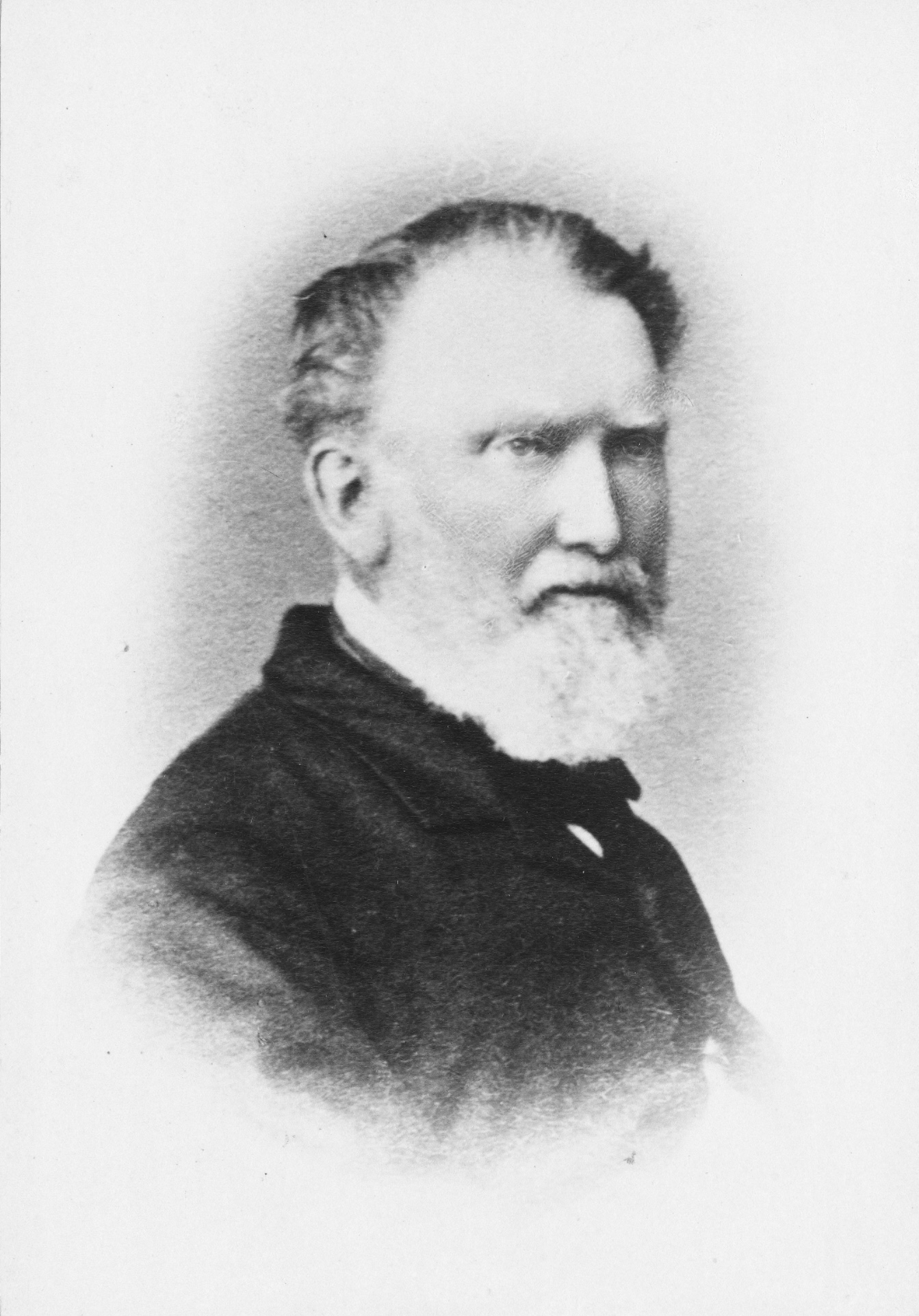
- Clerke in 1850-1876

Member of the Tasmanian Legislative Council for Longford
- In office 1853–1856
- Preceded by: Joseph Archer
- Succeeded by: Robert Kermode

Personal details
- Born: 17 March 1804 Skibbereen, Ireland
- Died: 20 March 1877 (age 73) Leven, Tasmania
- Party: None

Alexander Clerke (17 March 1804 – 20 March 1877) was an Irish politician in Tasmania, who was a member of the electoral division of Longford from 1853 to 1856.

== Life ==
Clerke grew up in a middle class family in Skibbereen. He trained as an engineer while his brother, Thomas, became a lawyer and moved to New York, United States. In 1853, he became the member of the Tasmanian Legislative Council in Longford, and stayed in that position for three years. He died at his property "Sea View," near Leven, on 20 March 1877, three days after his 73rd birthday, in Tasmania.

Tasmanian Legislative Council
Preceded by Joseph Archer	Member for Longford; 1853–1856	Succeeded by Robert Kermode
Tasmanian House of Assembly
Preceded by William Champ; Adye Douglas; John Rogers	Member for Launceston; 1857–1860	Succeeded by Joseph Cohen
Preceded by Robert Kermode	Member for Ringwood; 1862–1863	Succeeded by Alfred Horne
Tasmanian Legislative Council
Preceded by William Nairn	Member for Meander; 1869–1871	Succeeded by John Thomson
Tasmanian House of Assembly
Preceded by Frederick Houghton	Member for Ringwood; 1872–1874	Succeeded by William Gellibrand
