= Electoral district of Ringwood =

Electoral district of Ringwood may refer to:

- Electoral district of Ringwood (Victoria), an electoral district of the Victorian Legislative Assembly
- Electoral district of Ringwood (Tasmania), a former electoral district of the Tasmanian House of Assembly
