= William Brock (Australian politician) =

Australian politician

Member of the Tasmanian House of Assembly for Richmond
- In office 30 May 1882 – June 1885
- Preceded by: Charles Bromby
- Succeeded by: George Stokell

Personal details
- Born: c. 1851 Woodbank, Van Diemen's Land
- Died: 9 February 1913 (aged 62)

William Brock (c. 1851 – 9 February 1913) was an Australian politician.

Brock was born in Woodbank in Van Diemen's Land in about 1851. In 1882 he was elected to the Tasmanian House of Assembly, representing the seat of Richmond. He served until 1885. He died in 1913.

Tasmanian House of Assembly
| Preceded by Charles Bromby | Member for Richmond; 1882–1885 | Succeeded by George Stokell |
