= Robert Kermode =

Australian politician (1812–1870)

Robert Quayle Kermode
- Robert Kermode by Henry Mundy (portraitist), 1840

Member of the Tasmanian Legislative Council for Longford
- In office 1856–1857
- Preceded by: Alexander Clerke
- Succeeded by: William Weston

Personal details
- Born: 1812 Isle of Man, United Kingdom
- Died: 4 May 1870 (aged 58) Ross, Tasmania (presumed)
- Resting place: Ross, Tasmania

Robert Quayle Kermode (1812 – 4 May 1870) was a British politician. He was a member of the Tasmanian Legislative Council and the Tasmanian House of Assembly in the 1850s and 1860s. In 1852 Godfrey Mundy claimed Kermode to be the richest Manxman in the world, in his book Our Antipodes. Kermode's mansion, Mona Vale, itself was at the time the largest house in Australia.

== Life ==
Kermode was born on the Isle of Man. His parents were William Kermode (1780–1852), a merchant and settler from the Isle of Man, and Margaret Kermode (née Quayle). Kermode arrived in Van Diemen's Land with his father in 1827 and married his wife, Martha, daughter of Thomas Archer in November 1839. Kermode was a member of the Tasmanian Legislative Council for the Electoral division of Campbell Town from 28 October 1851 to 1852 and for the Electoral division of Longford from 10 October 1856 until resigning in 1857. Kermode was then a member of the Assembly for Ringwood from 16 May 1857 to 1859 and again from 17 June 1861 to 1862. Then Kermode represented the Electoral division of North Esk from 13 June 1864 until retiring on 18 July 1868. Kermode died on 4 May 1870, at the age of 58.
