= Buckton, Northumberland =

Village in Northumberland, England

Coordinates: 55.639°N 1.871°W

Buckton
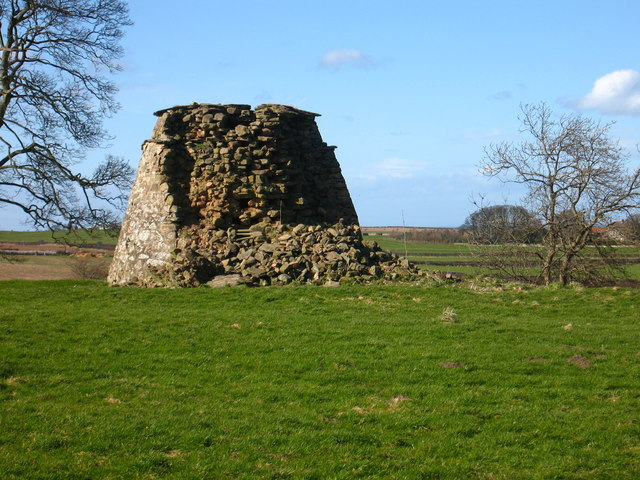
- Remains of dovecote at Buckton

- Location within Northumberland
- Civil parish: Kyloe
- Unitary authority: Northumberland
- Ceremonial county: Northumberland
- Region: North East
- Country: England
- Sovereign state: United Kingdom
- Police: Northumbria
- Fire: Northumberland
- Ambulance: North East

Buckton is a hamlet in the civil parish of Kyloe, in Northumberland, England, located just over 5 km north of Belford.

Buckton consists of a farm and a few cottages. Buckton is the site of a medieval deserted village, which was first recorded in 1560, but had shrunk in size by the mid-18th century. The farmhouse dates from the 18th century and has a walled garden. The remains of a late medieval dovecote (Grade II listed) are located to the north of the farm. Buckton Burn flows close to the settlement. In 1870-72 the township had a population of 183.

Thomas Gregson, second premier of Tasmania, was born in Buckton.
