= William Gellibrand (politician) =

Australian politician

Member of the Tasmanian House of Assembly for Fingal
- In office 11 September 1871 – September 1872
- Preceded by: John Swan
- Succeeded by: Adye Douglas

Member of the Tasmanian House of Assembly for Ringwood
- In office 9 May 1874 – July 1886
- Preceded by: Alexander Clerke
- Succeeded by: Seat abolished

Personal details
- Born: William St Paul Gellibrand; 18 December 1823 At sea
- Died: 22 August 1905 (aged 81) Hobart, Tasmania

William St Paul Gellibrand (18 December 1823 – 22 August 1905) was an Australian politician.

Gellibrand was born at sea in 1823. In 1871 he was elected to the Tasmanian House of Assembly, representing the seat of Fingal, but he was defeated the following year. He returned in 1874 as the member for Ringwood, serving until 1886. He died in 1905 in Hobart.

Tasmanian House of Assembly
Preceded by John Swan	Member for Fingal; 1871–1872	Succeeded by Adye Douglas
Preceded by Alexander Clerke	Member for Ringwood; 1874–1886	Abolished
