= George Stokell =

Australian politician

Member of the Tasmanian House of Assembly for Richmond
- In office 1 August 1885 – July 1886
- Preceded by: William Brock
- Succeeded by: Elliott Lewis

Personal details
- Born: 22 October 1826 Van Diemen's Land
- Died: 5 May 1898 (aged 71) Rokeby, Tasmania

George Stokell (22 October 1826 – 5 May 1898) was an Australian politician.

Stokell was born in Van Diemen's Land in 1826. In 1885 he was elected to the Tasmanian House of Assembly, representing the seat of Richmond. He served until 1886. In a macabre gesture, in 1860 when the last Tasmanian male died, George Stokell, member of the Royal Society of Tasmania, had her grave opened to make a suitcase with her skin. He died in 1898 in Rokeby.

Tasmanian House of Assembly
Preceded by William Brock	Member for Richmond; 1885–1886	Succeeded by Elliott Lewis
