= Electoral district of Franklin =

Former state electoral district of Tasmania, Australia

The Electoral district of Franklin was a single-member electoral district of the Tasmanian House of Assembly. It covered all of southern and southwestern Tasmania, and its main population centre was the town of Franklin in Tasmania's Huon Valley. Other centres included Castle Forbes Bay, Geeveston, Dover and Southport.

The seat was created ahead of the Assembly's first election held in 1856, and was abolished when the Tasmanian parliament adopted the Hare-Clark electoral model in 1909.

== Members for Franklin ==
Member	Term
William Crooke	1856–1857
John Balfe	1857–1871
John Davies	1871–1872
Russell Young	1872–1877
Joseph Risby	1877–1882
Stafford Bird	1882–1903
William Brownell	1903–1909
