= William Crooke (politician) =

Surgeon and politician in colonial Australia

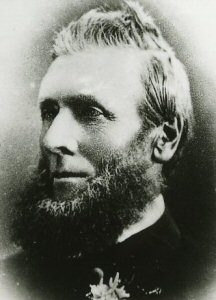
William Crooke

William Crooke (baptised 4 August 1815 – 10 December 1901) was a surgeon and politician in colonial Australia. He served in both houses of the parliament of Tasmania during the 1850s.

== Biography ==
Born in Derreen, County Cork, Ireland, Crooke was baptised on 4 August 1815. Around 1839–41, he arrived in Van Diemen's Land, which would become known as Tasmania. He was a surgeon in the convict department of St Mary's Hospital in Hobart Town. From 1843 to 1847, he held the position of house surgeon at the General Hospital, Hobart Town. He served as a member of the Tasmanian Legislative Council for Buckingham from 1855 to 1856, which he unsuccessfully contested in 1853, before serving in the Tasmanian House of Assembly for Franklin from 1856 to 1857. He proposed unsuccessfully for the Tasmanian government to fund £20,000 per year (equivalent to more than A$3 million in 2015) for the establishment of a state-owned university to rival mainland Australia.

In 1857, Crooke moved to Victoria, where he ran a surgery in Fitzroy, Melbourne. He was appointed Victorian public vaccinator after successfully identifying an outbreak of smallpox. He was also Australia's first medical practitioner to identify diseased milk as a factor in the production of diphtheria. He died at age 86 at St Vincent's Hospital, Fitzroy, on 10 December 1901.

Parliament of Tasmania
Preceded by Robert Officer	Member of the Legislative Council for Buckingham; 15 March 1855 – August 1856	Succeeded by Thomas Lowes
Preceded by Seat established	Member of the House of Assembly for Franklin; 18 September 1856 – February 1857	Succeeded by John Balfe
