= John Gregson (politician) =

Australian politician

John Compton Gregson (c. March 1821 – 16 December 1867) was a politician, member of the Tasmanian House of Assembly 1856 to 1859 and the Tasmanian Legislative Council 1859 to 1864.

Gregson was the eldest son of Thomas George Gregson Premier of Tasmania in 1857. Gregson was Chairman of Quarter Sessions at Launceston until being elected to the Tasmanian House of Assembly for Norfolk Plains on 13 September 1856, a position he held until 11 May 1859. Gregson was Attorney-General in his father's Administration, which only lasted from February to April 1857.

Gregson was then elected to the Tasmanian Legislative Council for Cambridge on 11 May 1859 and retired on 18 January 1864. He was Solicitor-General from 1864 to 1867.

Gregson died at his residence aged 46 years and 9 months.

Tasmanian House of Assembly
New title	Member for Norfolk Plains; 1856–1859	Succeeded by John Archer
Tasmanian Legislative Council
Preceded by Francis Burgess	Member for Cambridge; 1859–1864	Succeeded by Edward Abbott
