= Electoral division of Longford =

Former Tasmanian Legislative Council electoral division

The Electoral division of Longford was an electoral division in the Tasmanian Legislative Council of Australia. It existed from 1851 until its abolition in a redistribution in 1885.

== Members ==
Member	Party	Period
Joseph Archer	Independent	1851–1853
Alexander Clerke	Independent	1853–1856
Robert Kermode	Independent	1856–1857
William Weston	Independent	1857–1861
Joseph Archer	Independent	1861–1872
Edward Weston	Independent	1872–1877
William Dodery	Independent	1877–1885

== See also ==
- Tasmanian Legislative Council electoral divisions
