= Henry Anstey =

Australian politician

Henry Frampton Anstey (1822 – 8 July 1862) was a politician in colonial Tasmania, a nominee member of the Tasmanian Legislative Council and later an elected member of the Tasmanian House of Assembly.

Anstey was born in Devon, England, son of son of Thos. Anstey, of Anstey Burton, Tasmania. On 31 October 1851 Anstey was elected to the seat of Oatlands in the unicameral Tasmanian Legislative Council; Anstey was elected to the first Tasmanian House of Assembly for Oatlands on 4 September 1856. Anstey was Secretary for Lands and Works in the first Tasmanian Ministry from November 1856 to February 1857. Having been received into the Roman Catholic Church in 1842, he was created a Knight of St. Gregory by Pope Pius IX., and by special privilege was buried in the Basilica of Santa Maria del Popolo at Rome, where he resided for two years prior to his death on 8 July 1862, at the age of forty. He was Roman correspondent of the London Tablet during his stay in the Eternal City, and was brother of Mr. T. Chisholm Anstey, the well-known and eccentric Indian publicist and member of the House of Commons.
