= Electoral district of Richmond (Tasmania) =

Former state electoral district of Tasmania

The electoral district of Richmond was a single-member electoral district of the Tasmanian House of Assembly. Its capital was the town of Richmond to the north of Hobart.

The seat was created ahead of the Assembly's first election held in 1856, and was abolished at the 1903 election. Its first member, Thomas Gregson, served as the second Premier of Tasmania for a few weeks in 1857.

== Members for Richmond ==
Member	Term
Thomas Gregson	1856–1872
William Hodgson	1872–1881
Charles Bromby	1881–1882
William Brock	1882–1885
George Stokell	1885–1886
Elliott Lewis	1886–1903
