= Henry Mundy (portraitist) =

English portraitist (1798–1848)

Henry Mundy or Munday (1798–1848) was an English pioneer settler and portraitist in the colony of Van Diemen's Land. He worked as a portraitist in Launceston in the early 1840s, and tried his hand at farming, but want of funds forced him to move to Hobart in 1842, where he died of an overdose of laudanum in 1848, leaving a wife, Lavinia, and five children.

== Sources ==
- "Henry Mundy, 1798–1848". National Portrait Gallery. 2019. Retrieved 3 April 2023.
- Stilwell, G. T.; Oppeln, Carolyn von (1992; updated 2011). "Henry Mundy b. c.1798". Design & Art Australia Online. Retrieved 3 April 2023.
