= Thomas Gregson =

2nd Premier of Tasmania, Australia

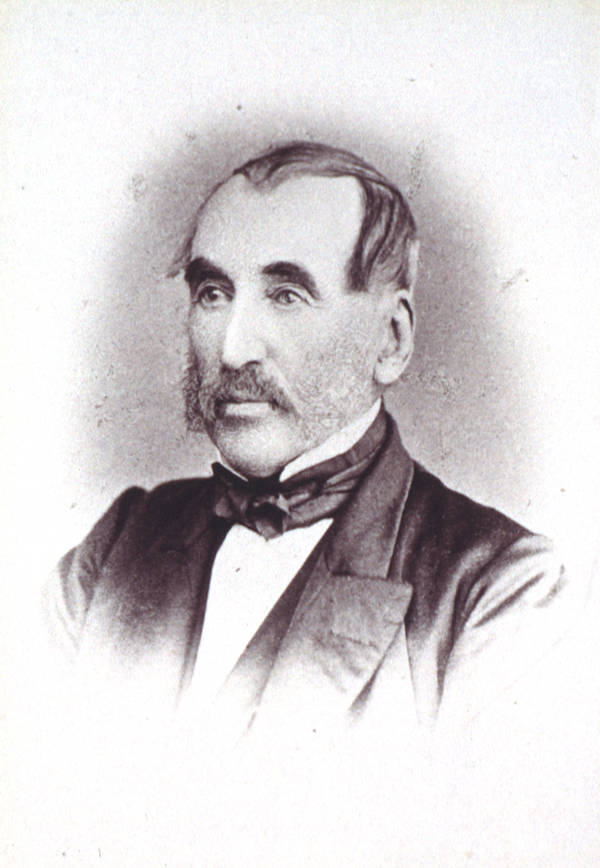

2nd Premier of Tasmania
- In office 26 February 1857 – 25 April 1857
- Governor: Sir Henry Young
- Preceded by: William Champ
- Succeeded by: William Weston

Personal details
- Born: Thomas George Gregson; 7 February 1796 Buckton, Northumberland, England
- Died: 4 January 1874 (aged 77) Risdon, Tasmania, Australia
- Spouse: Elizabeth Bugg (m. 1820)
- Relations: John Gregson (son)
- Occupation: Landowner

Thomas George Gregson (7 February 1796 – 4 January 1874) was an Australian businessman and politician in the colony of Tasmania, earlier known as Van Diemen's Land. He was born in England and arrived in the colony in 1821, where he acquired significant landholdings. After responsible government was granted he was elected to the House of Assembly and served as the second premier of Tasmania from 1856 to 1857.

== Early life ==
Gregson was born on 7 February 1796 in Buckton, Northumberland, England. He was the son of John Gregson, a member of the Gregson family associated with nearby Lowlynn House.

In 1820, apparently following a family dispute or an inheritance dispute, Gregson applied to the Colonial Secretary for a recommendation of a grant of land in Van Diemen's Land. He stated that he had available capital of £3,000 (equivalent to £300,000 in 2025) and attached a letter of support from Hugh Percy, 3rd Duke of Northumberland. Gregson arrived in Hobart Town aboard Emerald on 13 March 1821, accompanied by his wife, brother-in-law, an assistant and two other servants. He also brought "a grand piano, forge and bellows, patent brewing machine, fourteen iron ploughs, wine, plate and linen".

Gregson was authorised by Lieutenant-Governor William Sorrell to take up the maximum land grant of 2,000 acres (810 ha). He settled near Jericho, although he did not receive formal title until 1823 when he was granted 1,800 acres (730 ha) on the Jordan River and a separate grant of 200 acres (81 ha) on the Clarence Plains on the River Derwent close to Hobart.

== Public life ==
In 1824, Gregson was involved in petitioning for Van Diemen's Land to be separated from the colony of New South Wales as a Crown colony in its own right. He became a leader of the free settlers in the colony.

Gregson was one of the few landowners to oppose the Black Line of 1830, which sought to drive out Aboriginal Tasmanians from the settled districts. John West recalled that he compared the initiative to "an attempt to harpoon a whale from the heights of Mount Wellington". Gregson refused to participate in military action or allow the participation of his servants, and according to James Bonwick's 1870 account The Last of the Tasmanians held "that such a warlike demonstration was uncalled for, and that the Natives, as real masters of the soil, ought not to be forced from the territory bequeathed to them by their fathers, and now usurped by the British crown".

== Parliamentary politics ==
In 1843, Gregson was appointed to the Legislative Council by Franklin. He was one of the "Patriotic Six" who resigned in 1845 to protest Governor John Eardley-Wilmot's fiscal policy, but he was subsequently reinstated at the direction of the Colonial Office.

Gregson was elected to the Legislative Council seat of Richmond in October 1851, standing as an Anti-Transportation candidate. He was involved in the drafting of Tasmania's first constitution under responsible government and in 1856 was elected to the Richmond seat in the new Tasmanian House of Assembly.

== Personal life ==
In 1820, Gregson married Elizabeth Bugg. He was predeceased in 1865 by his daughter Elizabeth, who married James Whyte, and in 1867 by his son John Gregson, who served as attorney-general during his brief stint as premier.

Gregson died at Risdon on 4 January 1874. After his death his substantial estate on Hobart's Eastern Shore was broken up and subdivided, leading to the creation of the suburb of Lindisfarne.

Political offices
Preceded by William Champ	Premier of Tasmania; 1857	Succeeded by William Weston
