= Robert Officer =

Australian politician (1800–1879)

- Born: 3 October 1800; Dundee, Forfarshire, Scotland
- Died: 8 July 1879 (aged 78); New Norfolk, Tasmania, Australia
- Occupations: politician and medical officer
- Notable work: Knighted in 1869

Sir Robert Officer M.A., (3 October 1800 – 8 July 1879) was an Australian politician and medical officer.

== Early life ==
Officer was the son of Robert Officer, and was born in Dundee, Forfarshire, Scotland, and graduated B.A., and subsequently M.A., at St. Andrews University. Having obtained his diploma as a member of the Royal College of Surgeons, England, he emigrated to Tasmania, where he married Scotland-born Jemima Patterson in 1823 and was appointed Government medical officer for New Norfolk in 1824. He moved to nearby Bothwell with his family, after receiving a land grant on the Clyde River in 1826. In 1835, the family moved to Hobart.

He also acquired considerable private practice in partnership with Dr. James Agnew, who was later Premier of the colony. Sir Robert paid a brief visit to Victoria whilst the gold fever was at its height; but ultimately returned to Tasmania, where, after filling the post of Assistant Colonial Surgeon, he retired from the medical profession, resigning his practice to Dr. Agnew.

== Political career ==
In 1853 Officer was returned to the old Tasmanian Legislative Council, then the only Chamber, for Buckingham. In the following year the new Constitution Act was passed, and when the first election under the bi-cameral system took place, in September 1856, Sir Robert Officer was returned to the House of Assembly for the district of Glenorchy. He was at once chosen Chairman of Committees, and on the retirement of Mr. Fenton in August 1861, became Speaker of the House. This position he held uninterrupted until April 1877, having been four times re-elected in the interval, and having throughout the whole term of his Speakership been returned unopposed for Glenorchy.

== Late life ==
Sir Robert was knighted in 1869; and after his resignation of the Speakership he retired to live at Hall Green, his residence near New Norfolk. There he occupied himself in hop cultivation and salmon acclimatization, industries in which he was greatly interested, and of which he was one of the leading pioneers. He died on 8 July 1879 in New Norfolk, Tasmania, Australia. A son, Charles Myles Officer, became a politician in Victoria (Australia).
