= William Weston (Australian politician) =

Australian politician

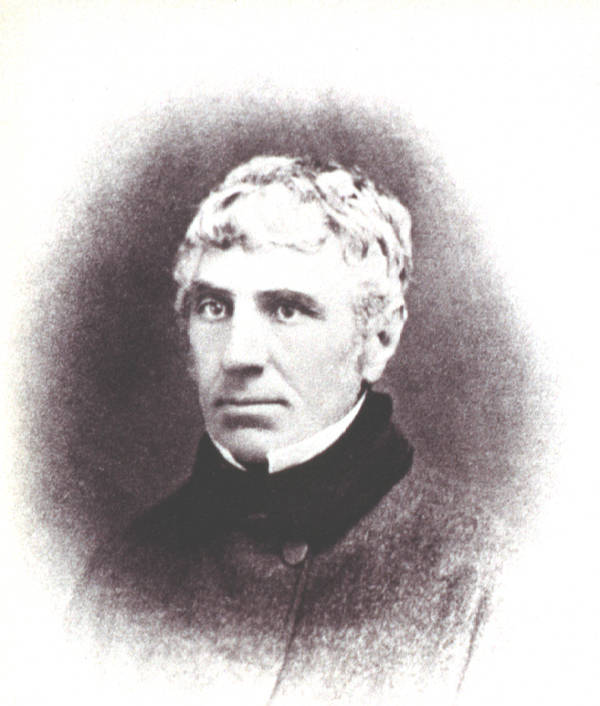

3rd Premier of Tasmania
- In office 25 April 1857 – 12 May 1857
- Preceded by: Thomas Gregson
- Succeeded by: Francis Smith
- In office 1 November 1860 – 2 August 1861
- Preceded by: Francis Smith
- Succeeded by: Thomas Chapman

Member of the Tasmanian Legislative Council for Longford
- In office 1857–1861
- Preceded by: Robert Kermode
- Succeeded by: Joseph Archer

Personal details
- Born: 28 November 1804 Shoreditch, Middlesex, England
- Died: 21 February 1888 (aged 83) St Kilda, Victoria

William Pritchard Weston (28 November 1804 – 21 February 1888) was the third Premier of Tasmania.

== Early life ==
William Weston was born in Shoreditch, England, to John Weston, a surgeon. He was educated in Brighton and spent several years working in a merchant's counting house and in the wool trade.

Weston emigrated to Tasmania in 1823, sailing aboard the Adrian with fellow passenger George Arthur, the new lieutenant-governor of Van Diemen's Land. Weston had more than £3000 and a letter of recommendation from a friend at the Colonial Office. Originally intending to travel on to Sydney, when the ship docked in Hobart, Weston decided to remain in Van Diemen's Land. On-board, he had met Captain William Clark, whose daughter Ann he went on to marry in 1826 at the Clark's property 'Cluny' in Bothwell.

Weston lived in Bothwell for several years, assisting Horace and Charles Rowcroft, with Charles writing about Weston in his book Tales of the Colonies (London, 1845). Weston purchased a property near Longford. In Longford, Weston built a two storey Regency-style house 'Hythe' in Longford, which was started in 1831 and finished in 1834. He and his wife had eight children, with the eldest dying in infancy.

== Public career ==
Holding office on two occasions. Weston was elected to parliament at the original opening, in 1856 in the electoral district of Ringwood. He served for a short term as Premier from 25 April 1857 until 12 May 1857. He resigned his seat in the Tasmanian House of Assembly on 20 May 1857, instead taking a position in the Tasmanian Legislative Council as the member for Longford on 19 May 1857. He became Premier again on 1 November 1860 holding the position until 2 August 1861.

== Later life ==
Ill health forced him to resign from the Tasmanian Parliament altogether in the 1860s. He later moved to Victoria, dying in St Kilda. He was survived by a son and five daughters, with his eldest son Edward inheriting his Longford property Hythe, and his second son Maurice inheriting the Cluny property in Bothwell from his Clark grandfather.

Political offices
| Preceded by Thomas Gregson | Premier of Tasmania; 1857 | Succeeded by Francis Smith |
| Preceded by Francis Smith | Premier of Tasmania; 1860–1861 | Succeeded by Thomas Chapman |
Tasmanian Legislative Council
| Preceded by Robert Kermode | Member for Longford; 1857–1861 | Succeeded by Joseph Archer |
