= Electoral district of Ringwood (Tasmania) =

Former electoral district of the Tasmanian House of Assembly

The Electoral district of Ringwood was a single-member electoral district of the Tasmanian House of Assembly. It was based in an agricultural region to the southwest of Launceston, Tasmania's second city.

The seat was created ahead of the Assembly's first election held in 1856, and was largely recreated as Cressy at the 1886 election, with a less populated region moving to Cumberland. The seat had a higher turnover of members in its first eighteen years than any other seat in Tasmania.

== Members for Ringwood ==
Member	Term
William Weston	1856–1857
Robert Kermode	1857–1859
Frederick Houghton	1859–1861
Robert Kermode	1861–1862
Alexander Clerke	1862–1863
Alfred Horne	1863–1865
John Meredith	1865–1866
George Gibson	1866–1869
Robert Archer	1869–1871
Basil Archer	1871–1872
Frederick Houghton	1872–1872
Alexander Clerke	1872–1874
William Gellibrand	1874–1886
