= William Champ =

British Army officer and first Premier of Tasmania

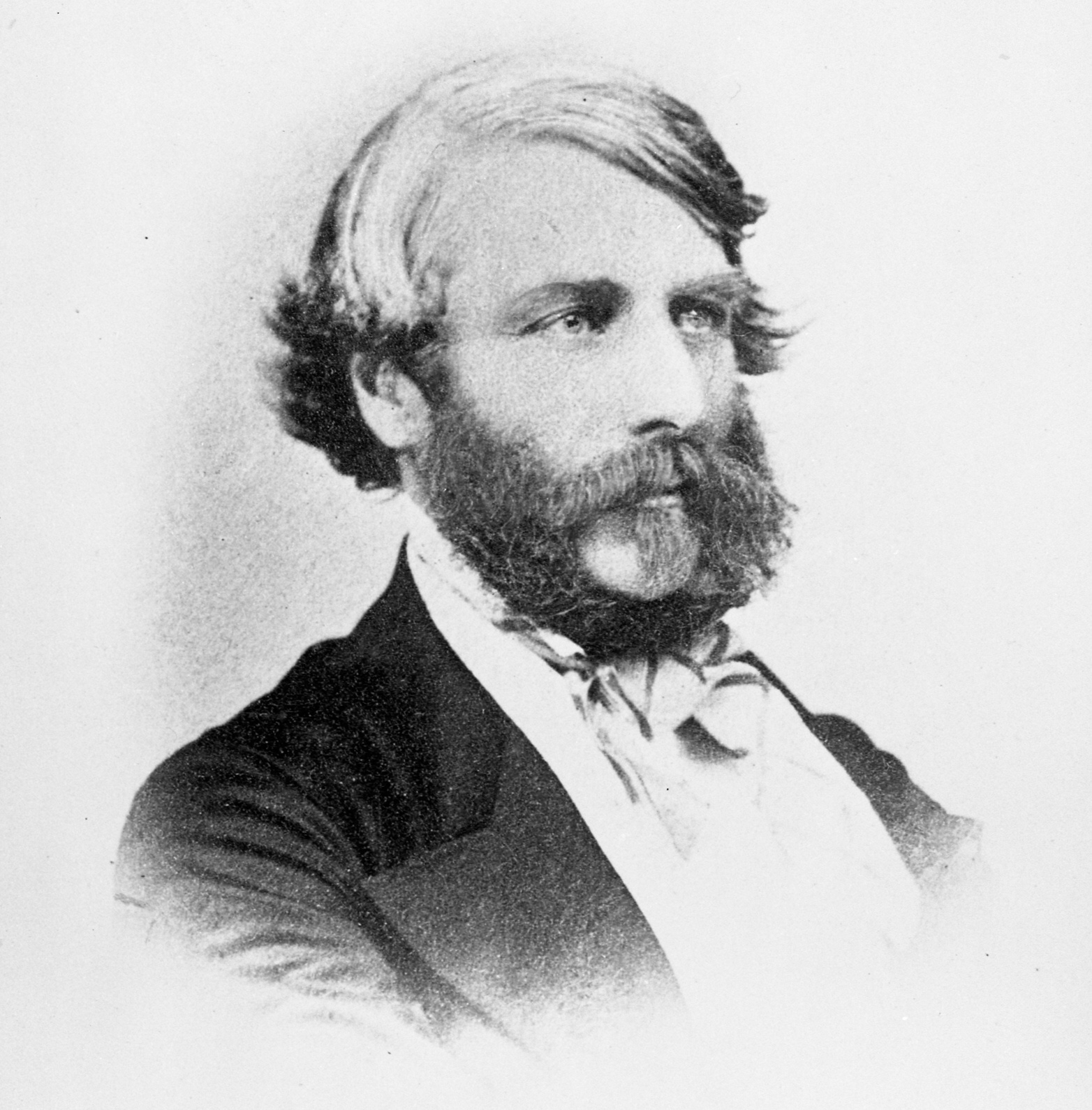
- Official portrait, 1856

1st Premier of Tasmania
- In office 1 November 1856 – 26 February 1857
- Succeeded by: Thomas Gregson
- Constituency: Launceston

3rd Member for East Bourke Boroughs
- In office 1871–1873
- Preceded by: Edward Cope
- Succeeded by: George Higinbotham

Personal details
- Born: 15 April 1808 Maldon, Essex, England, UK
- Died: 25 August 1892 (aged 84) Melbourne, Colony of Victoria
- Spouse: Helen Abigail Gibson
- Children: 4
- Profession: Soldier; politician; penal administrator

Military service
- Allegiance: United Kingdom
- Branch/service: British Army
- Years of service: 1826–1834
- Unit: 63rd Regiment of Foot

William Thomas Napier Champ (15 April 1808 – 25 August 1892) was a British soldier and Colonial Australian politician and penal administrator, who served as the first Premier of Tasmania from 1856 to 1857.

== Early life ==
Champ was born in Maldon, Essex, England. He joined the army as an ensign when he was 18 years old and later became an adjutant.

== Army and police career ==
Champ was serving with the 63rd Regiment of Foot as an ensign by 1826 and was posted with them to Sydney, Colony of New South Wales in October 1828. Some of the regiment was detached as a garrison force for the Macquarie Harbour Penal Station, Van Diemens Land (now Tasmania) in 1829, and Champ was amongst them.

As a lieutenant with the 63rd, he participated in the Black War campaign which was an attempt to segregate Tasmanian Aborigines near the end of 1830.

The 63rd left New South Wales and Van Diemens Land in 1834 to deploy to India and Burma and Champ left with the regiment. However, he had apparently enjoyed his time in Australia and later in 1834 he resigned his army commission and returned to Van Diemens Land to enter the civil service. Champ then became an assistant police magistrate, before being appointed as the commandant of Port Arthur penitentiary (succeeding Charles O'Hara Booth) in 1844.

In March 1857 Champ was appointed as inspector-general of penal establishments in Victoria, a position he held until his resignation on 31 December 1868. During his term, he was largely responsible for the building of HM Prison Pentridge.

== Political career ==
In 1852, Champ became a colonial secretary to Governor Denison. In the 1850s, the British parliament passed legislation that would give Tasmania a responsible 'independent' government. This created the Tasmanian House of Assembly. The first elections for the House of Assembly took place in 1856. Prior to this, Champ served as a member of the Tasmanian Legislative Council chosen by the Governor from 1852 until 1856.

Champ held office of premier for 117 days, until 26 February 1857. Shortly into his term, his ministry collapsed and Champ became unable to govern. He was briefly the opposition leader in 1857 but resigned shortly after.

He later entered politics in Victoria, becoming a member of the Victorian Legislative Assembly for East Bourke Boroughs from April 1871 until May 1873. He died in Melbourne, Victoria on 25 August 1892.

Political offices
New office	Premier of Tasmania; 1856–1857	Succeeded by Thomas Gregson
Victorian Legislative Assembly
Preceded by Edward Cope	Member for East Bourke Boroughs; 1871–1873	Succeeded by George Higinbotham
