= Edward Abbott (writer) =

Edward Abbott (25 February 1801 – 4 April 1869) was an Australian newspaper proprietor, legislator and gastronome whose anonymously‑published English and Australian Cookery Book is considered the first substantial cookbook written in Australia.

== Early life and education ==
Abbott was born in Sydney, the eldest child of Canadian-born army officer-turned-jurist Edward Abbott senior and his wife Louisa. When his father was appointed deputy judge-advocate of Van Diemen's Land, the family moved to Hobart Town in February 1815. He was educated privately and entered public service in 1818 as clerk to the Lieutenant-Governor's Court.

== Career ==
=== Publishing ===
In 1823, Abbott received a pastoral grant of 1,100 acres along the Derwent River, where he combined grazing activities with minor judicial responsibilities, becoming a justice of the peace in 1828. His public recognition increased after he founded and edited the Hobart Town Advertiser in April 1839, a tri-weekly publication covering political issues and culinary commentary. The newspaper served as a foundation for his English and Australian Cookery Book, published under the pseudonym "An Australian Aristologist." The book included a diverse collection of recipes and hunting traditions, such as roast beef and "slippery-bob" (kangaroo brains in emu fat), positioning Abbott as an early contributor to Australian culinary literature.

=== Politics ===
Abbott entered representative politics during the colony's first elections under responsible government, securing the seat of Clarence in the inaugural Tasmanian House of Assembly on 15 September 1856. He continued to represent Clarence until January 1864, when he moved unopposed to the Legislative Council, representing Cambridge. Although Abbott was better known for procedural contributions than formal speeches, he was regarded as a politician of integrity and reliability. In August 1867, he resigned from the Council to assume the salaried position of Usher of the Black Rod, which he retained until his death. Between 1860 and 1868, Abbott also served as the first warden (mayor) of the Municipality of Clarence, winning closely contested re-elections indicative of his local influence.

=== Civil works ===
As warden, he managed drainage and road infrastructure projects in the expanding district of Bellerive. Additionally, he served on the Inter-colonial Exhibition Commission responsible for selecting and sending Tasmanian exhibits to the 1866 Melbourne Exhibition. Parliamentary records from the early 1860s indicate that Abbott advocated for regular government subsidies to institutions such as the Benevolent Society of Hobart Town and the Royal Society of Tasmania, describing these subsidies as necessary public charities.
