= John Warrington Rogers =

Australian judge

John Warrington Rogers (1822 – 10 February 1906), MA QC, was a lawyer, member of parliament for the colony of Tasmania and judge of the County Court of Victoria.

Rogers was the eldest son of the John Warrington Rogers, of London, entered as a student to the Middle Temple in June 1848, and was called to the bar in November 1846. He emigrated to Tasmania, and was admitted to practise there in August 1865. Rogers was elected to the Tasmanian House of Assembly for Launceston on 8 September 1856 and was Solicitor-General in the first Ministry formed under responsible government, he resigned on 16 November 1857. In the latter year he removed to Victoria, where he was admitted to the bar in March.

In 1858 Rogers was appointed a judge of the County Court of Victoria at Ballarat and Creswick as well as Chairman of the Court of General Sessions and a judge of the Courts of Mines. In 1878 the Berry government sacked Warrington, along will all other judges of County Courts, Courts of Mines, Chairmen of Courts of General Sessions, Police Magistrates and a large number of public servants, an event referred to as "Black Wednesday". Rogers was temporarily reappointed on 29 January 1878, but to different counties, those previously held by Charles Skinner. His reappointment was challenged in the Supreme Court on the basis that the judges had not validly been removed. The Supreme Court held that County Court judges held office at pleasure and the Governor in council could remove them without cause. The government refused to give County Court judges security of tenure and Rogers resigned from 29 June 1878, on a pension. Rogers returned to the bar and was appointed a Queen's Counsel on 2 July 1878.

Rogers, was awarded a Master of Arts by University of Melbourne, was appointed a Law Lecturer at that University in 1878. He was President of the Royal Commission on Education appointed by the O'Loghlen Government.

Rogers died on 10 February 1906 in Brentford, Middlesex, and his will was proved on 29 March in London.
