= Bourke, New South Wales =

Coordinates: 30°04′54″S 145°57′04″E

Bourke
- Town
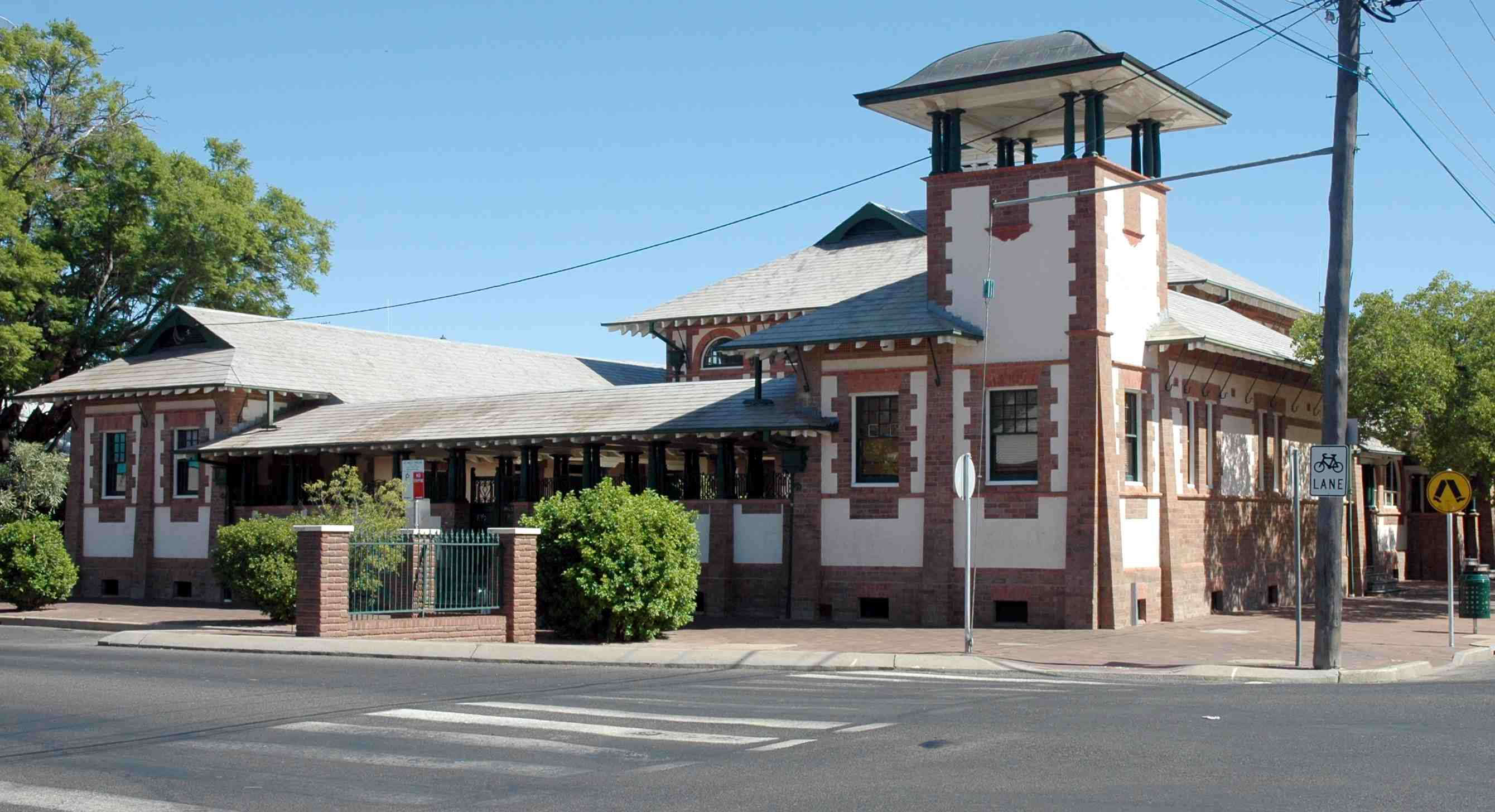
- Court house, former maritime court
- Interactive map of Bourke
- Country: Australia
- State: New South Wales
- LGA: Bourke Shire
- Location: 778 km (483 mi) NW of Sydney; 162 km (101 mi) N of Cobar; 96 km (60 mi) W of Brewarrina; 257 km (160 mi) S of Cunnamulla; 454 km (282 mi) S of Charleville

Government
  - State electorate: Barwon
  - Federal division: Parkes
- Elevation: 106 m (348 ft)

Population
  - Total: 1,535 (2021 census)
- Postcode: 2840
- County: Cowper County
- Mean max temp: 28.2 °C (82.8 °F)
- Mean min temp: 13.5 °C (56.3 °F)
- Annual rainfall: 331.5 mm (13.05 in)
Localities around Bourke
Fords Bridge	Enngonia	Ledknapper
Toorale National Park	Bourke	Brewarrina
Toorale National Park	Cobar	Byrock

Bourke is a town in the north-west of New South Wales, Australia. The administrative centre and largest town in Bourke Shire, Bourke is approximately 800 kilometres (500 mi) north-west of the state capital, Sydney, on the south bank of the Darling River. It is also situated:

- 137 kilometres south of Barringun and the Queensland – New South Wales Border
- 256 kilometres (159 mi) south of Cunnamulla
- 454 kilometres (282 mi) south of Charleville

== History ==
The location of the current township of Bourke is on a bend in the Darling River on the traditional country of the Ngemba people. Archaeological sites indicate Aboriginal occupancy of the region dating back thousands of years.

The first British explorer to explore the river was Charles Sturt in 1828 who named it after Sir Ralph Darling, Governor of New South Wales. Having struck the region during an intense drought and a low river, Sturt dismissed the area as largely uninhabitable and short of any features necessary for establishing reliable industry on the land.

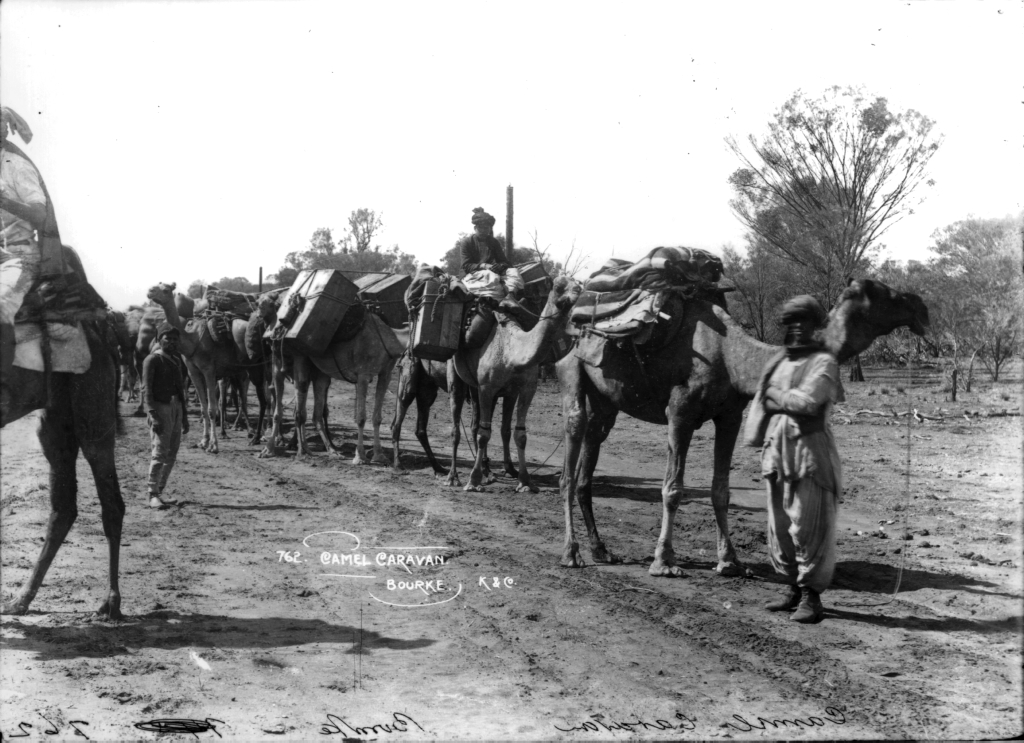
A camel caravan in Bourke circa 1900

Further exploration of the area did not occur until 1835 when the colonial surveyor Sir Thomas Mitchell conducted an expedition. Following tensions with the local people Mitchell built a small stockade to protect his men and named it Fort Bourke after then Governor Sir Richard Bourke. British pastoral settlement failed to occur for many years in the vicinity due to the large distances from the colonised areas and the strong resistance from the local Aboriginal population.

It wasn't until 1859 when British colonists were able to gain a foothold along the Upper Darling, with the arrival of paddle steamers making river transportation and trade to the southern settlements seasonally viable. The first paddle steamer to reach Fort Bourke was the Genesis in February 1859, skippered by Captain William Randell.

The first British pastoralist to appropriate land around Fort Bourke was Edward J Spence in late 1858, but it was Vincent James Dowling with his head stockman, John E Kelly, who successfully established the Fort Bourke cattle station and homestead in 1859. Dowling clashed with the resident Aboriginal population, receiving a spear through his hat and his horse being wounded by a boomerang. However, he was able to come to terms with the Indigenous people, who became a cheap source of labour for his run.

The immediate area around Fort Bourke where Mitchell had originally built his little stockade was deemed too flood prone for a township, so an elevated site on the east bank of the river around 10km north of the fort was chosen for closer settlement. This site was called by the Indigenous people Whertiemurtie and by the colonists 18 Mile Point. In 1862 the township of Bourke was officially surveyed and laid out at this locality.

As the pastoralist industry expanded around Bourke, the town rapidly grew into a busy river port, with paddle steamers shipping large quantities of stock and wool south to Echuca, from where the railway extension allowed further transportation to Melbourne.

Road infrastructure improved with the opening on 4 May 1883 of the North Bourke Bridge, designed by J.H. Daniels and modified in 1895 and 1903 by E.M. de Burgh. Its construction was begun by David Baillie and completed by McCulloch and Company. The 1895 modifications led to improved designs for subsequent lift-span bridges. The bridge is the oldest moveable-span bridge in Australia and is the sole survivor of its type in New South Wales. It served for 114 years before being bypassed in 1997 when a new bridge carrying the Mitchell Highway was opened just downstream.

By 1885 Bourke was made accessible by rail and reliance on the river trade to the south was quickly replaced by the more direct rail access to Sydney. Like many outback Australian townships, Bourke also utilised camels for overland transport, and the area supported a large Afghan community that had been imported to drive the teams of camels. A small Afghan mosque that dates back to the 1900s can be found within Bourke cemetery.

As trade moved away from river transport routes, Bourke's hold on the inland trade industry began to relax. Whilst no longer considered a trade centre, Bourke serves instead as a key service centre for the state's north western regions. In this semi-arid outback landscape, sheep farming along with some small irrigated cotton crops comprise the primary industry in the area today.

Bourke's traditional landholders endured a similar fate to Indigenous people across Australia. Dispossessed of their traditional country and in occasional conflict with white settlers, they battled a loss of land and culture and were hit hard by European disease. While the population of the local Ngemba and Barkindji people around the town of Bourke had dwindled by the late 19th century, many continued to live a traditional lifestyle in the region. Others found employment on local stations working with stock and found their skill as trackers in high demand.

A large influx of displaced Aboriginal peoples from other areas in the 1940s saw Bourke's indigenous community grow and led to the establishment of a reserve in 1946 by the Aborigines Protection Board. The majority of indigenous settlers were Wangkumara people from the Tibooburra region.

In 1962 in Perth, local high jumper Percy Hobson became the first person of Aboriginal descent to win a Commonwealth Games gold medal for Australia. The 5 ft 10 in (1.78 m) tall Hobson jumped 13 in (33 cm) above his height to win the event with a Games record leap of 6 ft 11 in (2.11 m). Hobson was celebrated on his return to Bourke and greeted by a brass band playing "Hail the Conquering Hero". A park and illustrated water tower now contribute to his memory.

== Heritage listings ==
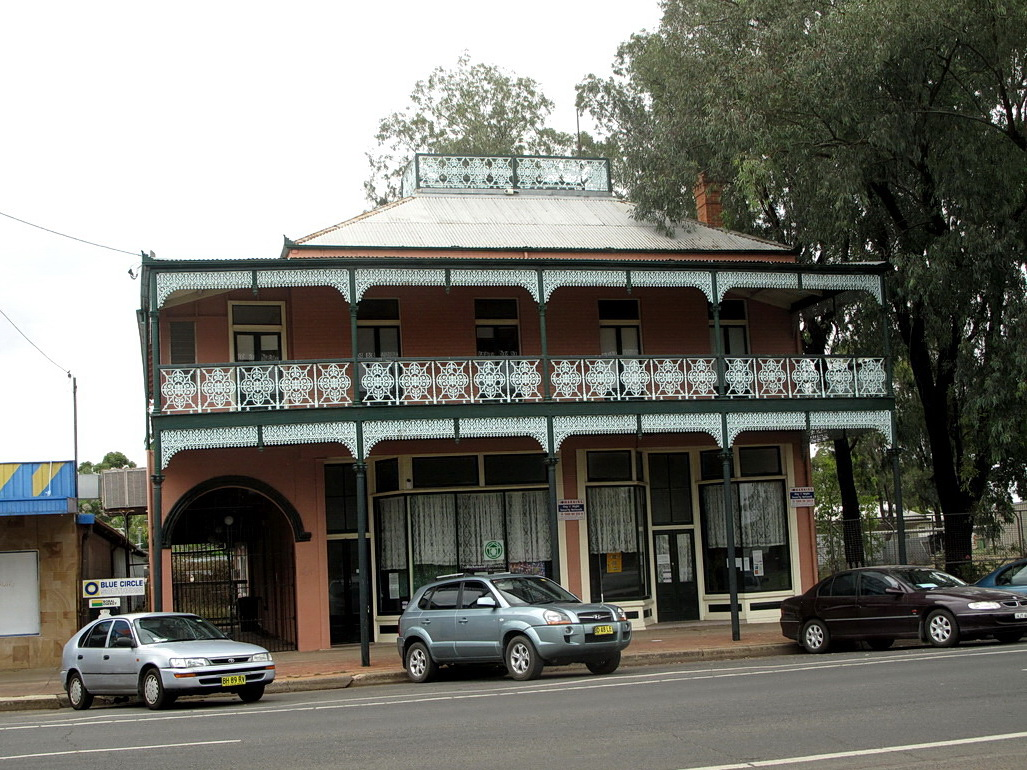
The old Towers Drug Company Building – built 1889–1890

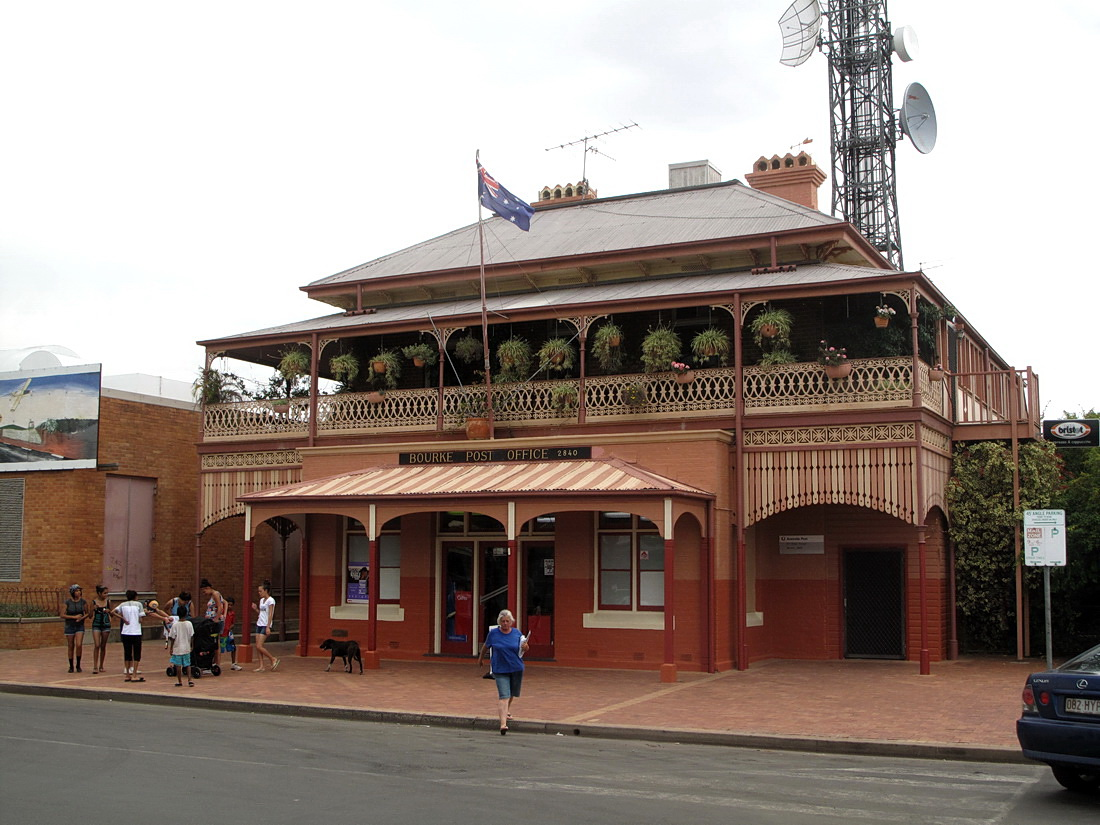
Bourke Post Office – built 1880

Bourke has a number of heritage-listed sites, including:

- 3–7 Meek Street: St Ignatius Roman Catholic Church and Convent
- 45 Mitchell Street: Towers Drug Company Building
- 47 Oxley Street: Bourke Post Office
- Richard Street: Bourke Court House
- 5 Richard Street: Ardsilla
- 17 Sturt Street: Old London Bank Building
- The North Bourke Bridge, opened in 1883, is on the Engineering Heritage Register.

== Climate ==
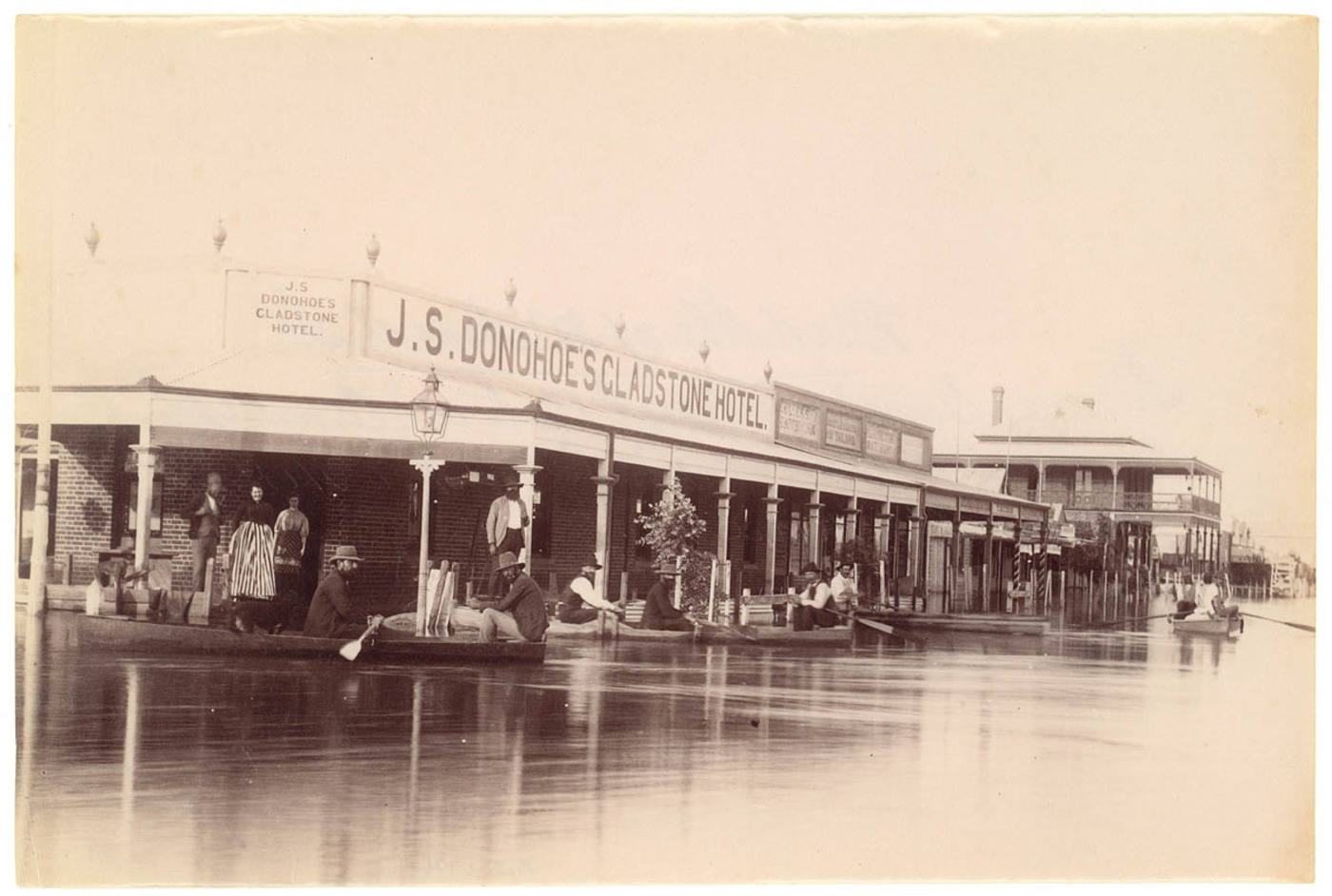
Mitchell Street, Bourke, in "The Wet", a flood that occurred in 1890

Under the Köppen–Geiger classification, Bourke has a hot semi-arid climate (BSh), with very hot summers and relatively cool winters that are generally mild by day. On 4 January 1903, Bourke recorded as much as 49.7 °C (121.5 °F), one of the highest temperatures recorded in New South Wales. It is extremely sunny with an average of 209 clear days annually from 1908–1994, though at the new site 153.7 clear days from 1999–2009.

Climate data for Bourke Airport AWS (30º02'S 145º57'E, 107 m AMSL) (1998–2024, extremes to 1871 [Post Office])
Month	Jan	Feb	Mar	Apr	May	Jun	Jul	Aug	Sep	Oct	Nov	Dec	Year
Record high °C (°F)	51.6 (124.9)	48.3 (118.9)	46.7 (116.1)	41.1 (106.0)	35.0 (95.0)	30.0 (86.0)	31.8 (89.2)	37.1 (98.8)	40.8 (105.4)	44.8 (112.6)	46.6 (115.9)	48.9 (120.0)	51.6 (124.9)
Mean daily maximum °C (°F)	37.6 (99.7)	35.7 (96.3)	32.8 (91.0)	28.0 (82.4)	22.5 (72.5)	18.9 (66.0)	18.7 (65.7)	21.5 (70.7)	25.9 (78.6)	29.7 (85.5)	32.5 (90.5)	35.5 (95.9)	28.3 (82.9)
Mean daily minimum °C (°F)	22.8 (73.0)	21.7 (71.1)	18.7 (65.7)	13.5 (56.3)	8.4 (47.1)	5.8 (42.4)	4.3 (39.7)	5.3 (41.5)	9.3 (48.7)	13.9 (57.0)	17.5 (63.5)	20.5 (68.9)	13.5 (56.2)
Record low °C (°F)	8.9 (48.0)	10.6 (51.1)	5.6 (42.1)	1.7 (35.1)	−2.8 (27.0)	−3.9 (25.0)	−3.5 (25.7)	−3.3 (26.1)	−1.7 (28.9)	1.7 (35.1)	3.3 (37.9)	5.0 (41.0)	−3.9 (25.0)
Average rainfall mm (inches)	32.2 (1.27)	30.8 (1.21)	38.9 (1.53)	23.6 (0.93)	23.6 (0.93)	28.6 (1.13)	14.0 (0.55)	13.3 (0.52)	20.2 (0.80)	28.7 (1.13)	44.4 (1.75)	32.9 (1.30)	331.5 (13.05)
Average rainy days (≥ 1.0 mm)	3.4	2.7	3.5	2.1	2.5	3.4	2.1	2.1	2.1	3.0	4.2	2.8	33.9
Average afternoon relative humidity (%)	24	28	27	28	36	47	41	30	24	22	25	21	29
Source 1: Australian Bureau of Meteorology Bourke Airport AWS (means, 1998–2024)
Source 2: Australian Bureau of Meteorology Bourke Post Office (extremes to 1871)

== Demographics ==
In 2021, there were 1,535 people in Bourke.

- Aboriginal and Torres Strait Islander people made up 35.7% of the population.
- 73.0% of people were born in Australia and 77.0% spoke only English at home.
- The most popular (37.9%) religion was Catholicism.

In Bourke today, there are 21 recognised indigenous language groups, including Ngemba, Barkindji, Wangkumara and Muruwari.

Historical population
Year	Pop.	±%
1921	1,430	—
1933	1,778	+24.3%
1947	2,025	+13.9%
1954	2,642	+30.5%
1961	3,001	+13.6%
1966	3,300	+10.0%
1971	3,622	+9.8%
1976	3,534	−2.4%
1981	3,326	−5.9%
1986	3,018	−9.3%
1991	2,976	−1.4%
1996	2,775	−6.8%
2001	2,555	−7.9%
2006	2,145	−16.0%
2011	2,047	−4.6%
2016	1,824	−10.9%
2021	1,535	−15.8%
Source: Australian Bureau of Statistics data.

== Education ==
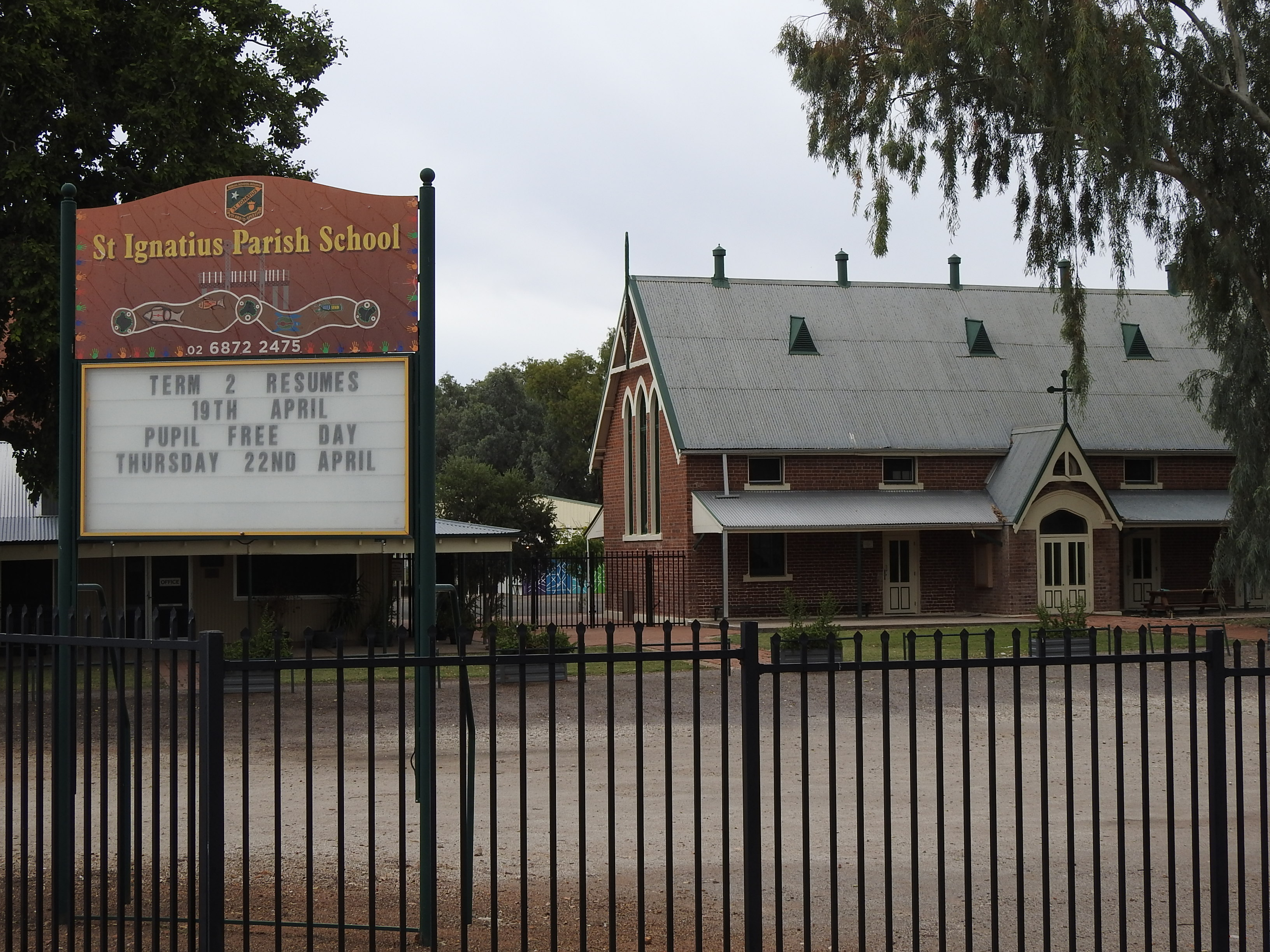
Saint Ignatius Parish School (2021).

Bourke has many schools for preschool children, primary and high school students. The Bourke–Walgett School of Distance Education allows children to be schooled at home, from preschool to year 12.

== Transportation ==
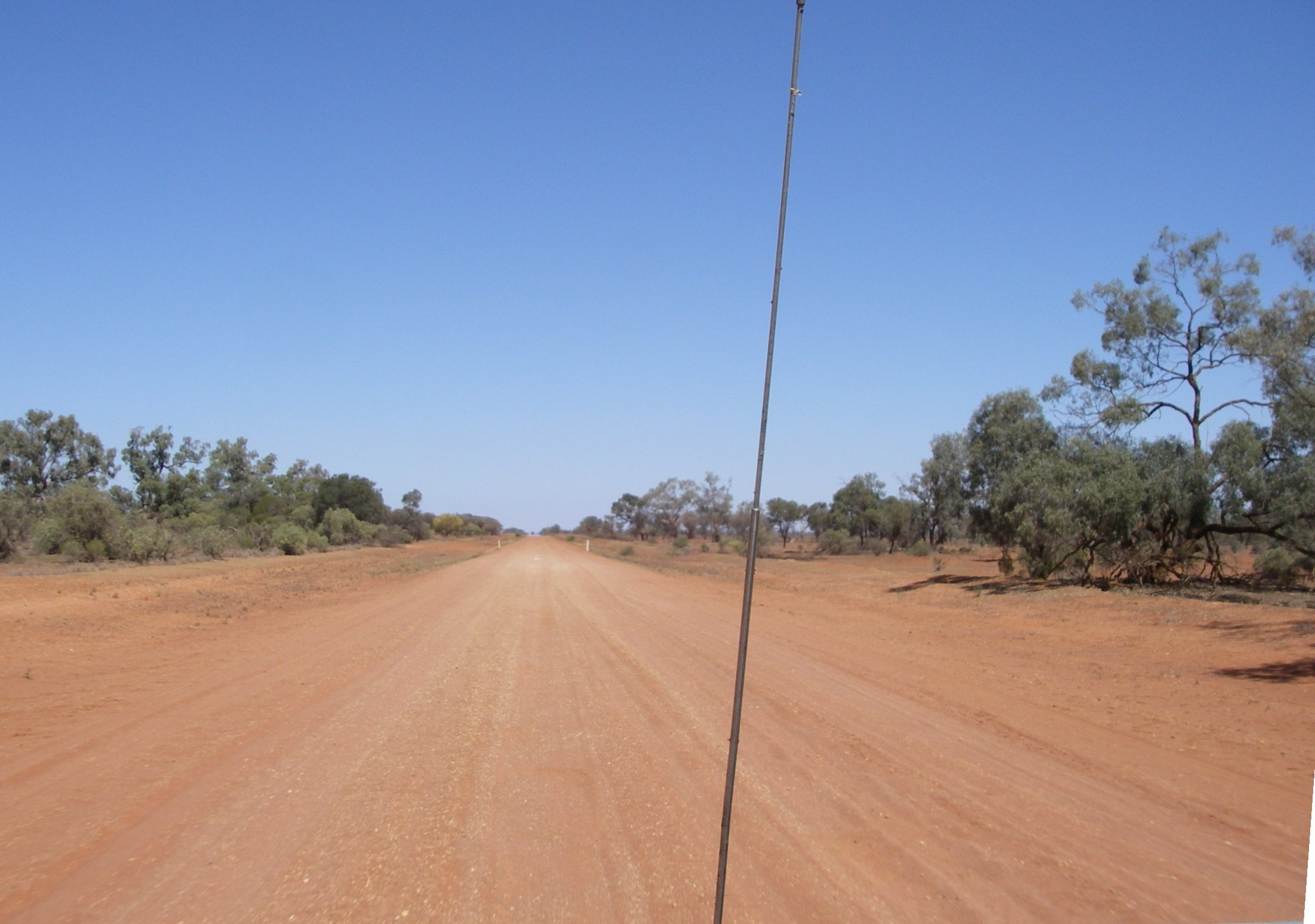
The unsealed Bourke-Wilcannia highway links the two towns.

Bourke can be reached by the Mitchell Highway from both the north from Charleville and Cunnamulla and from the southeast from Nyngan. Brewarrina and Walgett are located on the Kamilaroi Highway that has its western terminus in Bourke. Moree and Goondiwindi, located on the Newell Highway, connect to Bourke via various roads. Cobar via the Kidman Way, is connected from the south.

The town is also served by Bourke Airport and has NSW TrainLink bus service to other regional centres such as Dubbo. It was formerly the largest inland port in the world for exporting wool on the Darling River. The Bourke court house is unique in inland Australia in that it was originally a maritime court and to this day maintains that distinction. That distinction is evident in the crowns that sits above the finials of the flag poles atop the corner parapets of the building.

Prior to its closure, Bourke railway station was the terminus of the Main Western railway line. The railway extension from Byrock opened on 3 September 1885. Passenger services on the line were cancelled in September 1975 with the line closing down entirely in 1986, leaving the station derelict.

== Cultural significance ==
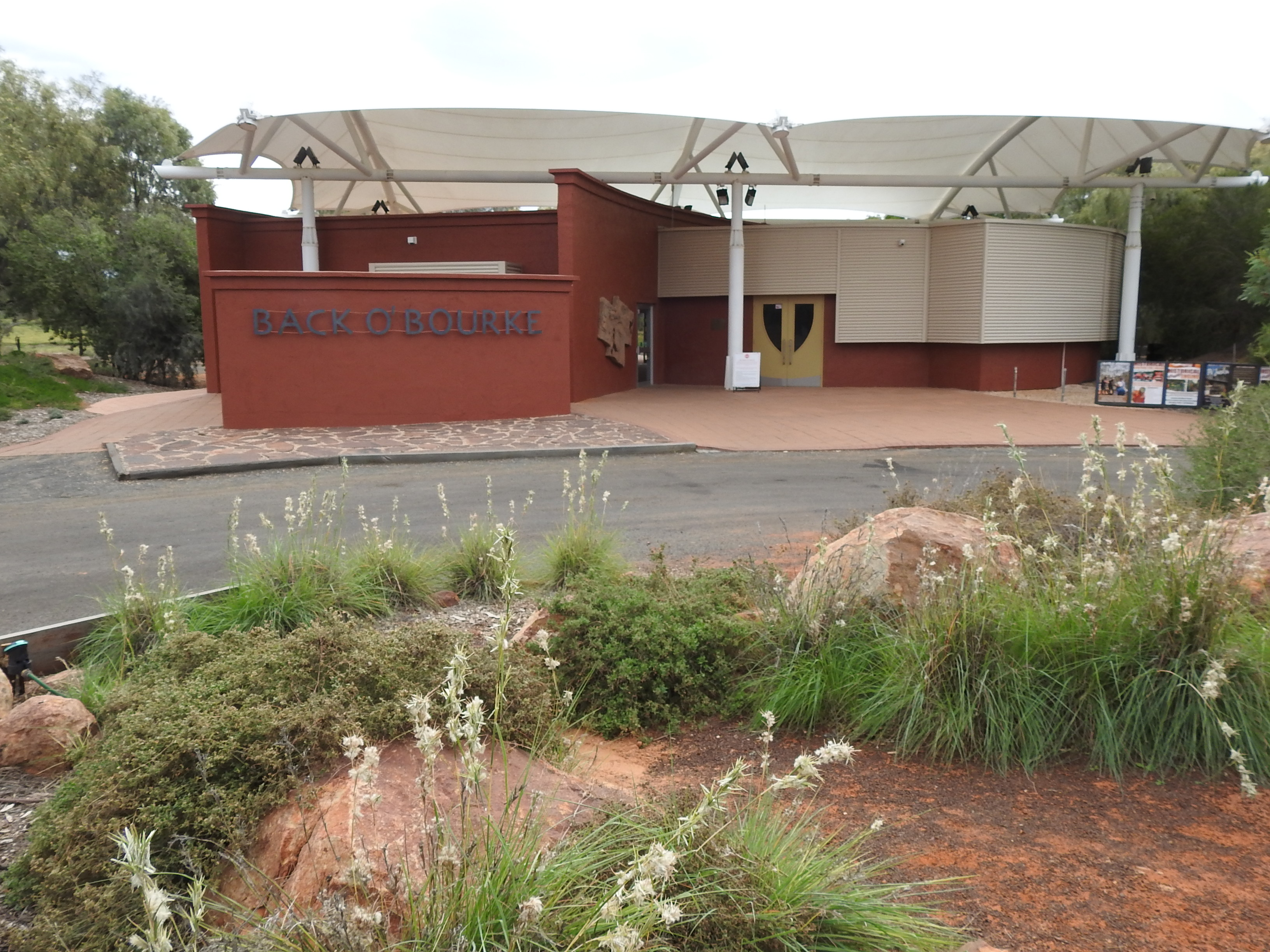
Back o' Bourke Information Centre (2021).

Bourke is considered to represent the edge of the settled agricultural districts and the gateway to the outback that lies north and west of Bourke. This is reflected in a traditional east coast Australian expression "back o' Bourke", from the poem by Scottish-Australian poet and bush balladeer Will H. Ogilvie.

The Tourist Information Centre is located on the Mitchell Highway at The Back 'O Bourke Exhibition Centre.

In 1892 a young writer Henry Lawson was sent to Bourke by the Bulletin editor J. F. Archibald to get a taste of outback life and to try to curb his heavy drinking. In Lawson's own words "I got £5 and a railway ticket from the Bulletin and went to Bourke. Painted, picked up in a shearing shed and swagged it for six months". The experience was to have a profound effect on the 25-year-old and his encounter with the harsh realities of bush life inspired much of his subsequent work. Lawson would later write "if you know Bourke you know Australia". In 1992 eight poems, written under a pseudonym and published in the Western Herald, were discovered in the Bourke library archives and confirmed to be Lawson's work.

Bush poets Harry 'Breaker' Morant (1864–1902) and Will H. Ogilvie (1869–1963) also spent time in the Bourke region and based much of their work on the experience.

Eye surgeon Fred Hollows was buried in Bourke after his death in 1993. Fred Hollows had worked at Enngonia and around the Bourke area in the early 1970s and had asked to be buried there.

The Telegraph Hotel, established in 1888 beside the Darling River, has been restored and now operates as the Riverside Motel.

== Crime ==
In 2008, persistently high levels of criminal offending in Bourke led to a ban of the takeaway sales of beer in glass bottles, fortified wine larger than 750 mL and cask wine larger than two litres with only 3.5% or less alcohol non-glass bottles being sold during the four hours around midday. In 2013, a US-style justice reinvestment program called Maranguka was put in place to combat offending.

By 2017, there had been a 38% reduction in significant juvenile charges in Bourke. However, by 2022 crime in Bourke had again increased which the founder of Maranguka attributed to the COVID-19 pandemic.

In February 2022, ABC Radio's national current affairs program The World Today detailed numerous allegations of local health workers being routinely abused, threatened and attacked by patients at Bourke Hospital. Such incidents led the University of Sydney to suspend student nurse placements in Bourke.

A lead organiser with the New South Wales Nurses and Midwives' Association said the violence against health workers in Bourke was emblematic of the issues facing such staff in remote areas. She claimed administration staff from the front office were being called on to check on patients in the aged care wing because there was an insufficient number of nurses. She believed the patients at the hospital were being neglected due to a lack of staff with just two registered nurses responsible for the emergency department, an acute ward, an aged care wing and a COVID ward during a night shift. She feared a nurse could lose their life through the violence, or that a patient could die through the chronic staffing shortages.

Bourke Shire mayor Barry Hollman expressed concern for the ramifications for the hospital if the ongoing violence prompted health workers to refuse to come to Bourke. He said he was devastated by the level of violence in the town, which had shocked the community.

In a statement, Western New South Wales Local Health District chief executive Mark Spittal said his organisation had a zero tolerance of threatening or criminal behaviour and was working with Bourke Shire Council, various agencies and community leaders to address the issues. Spittal said a number of measures had already been established including a 24/7 security presence and improvements to infrastructure such as lighting with further measures expected to be put in place in the near future.

== Media ==
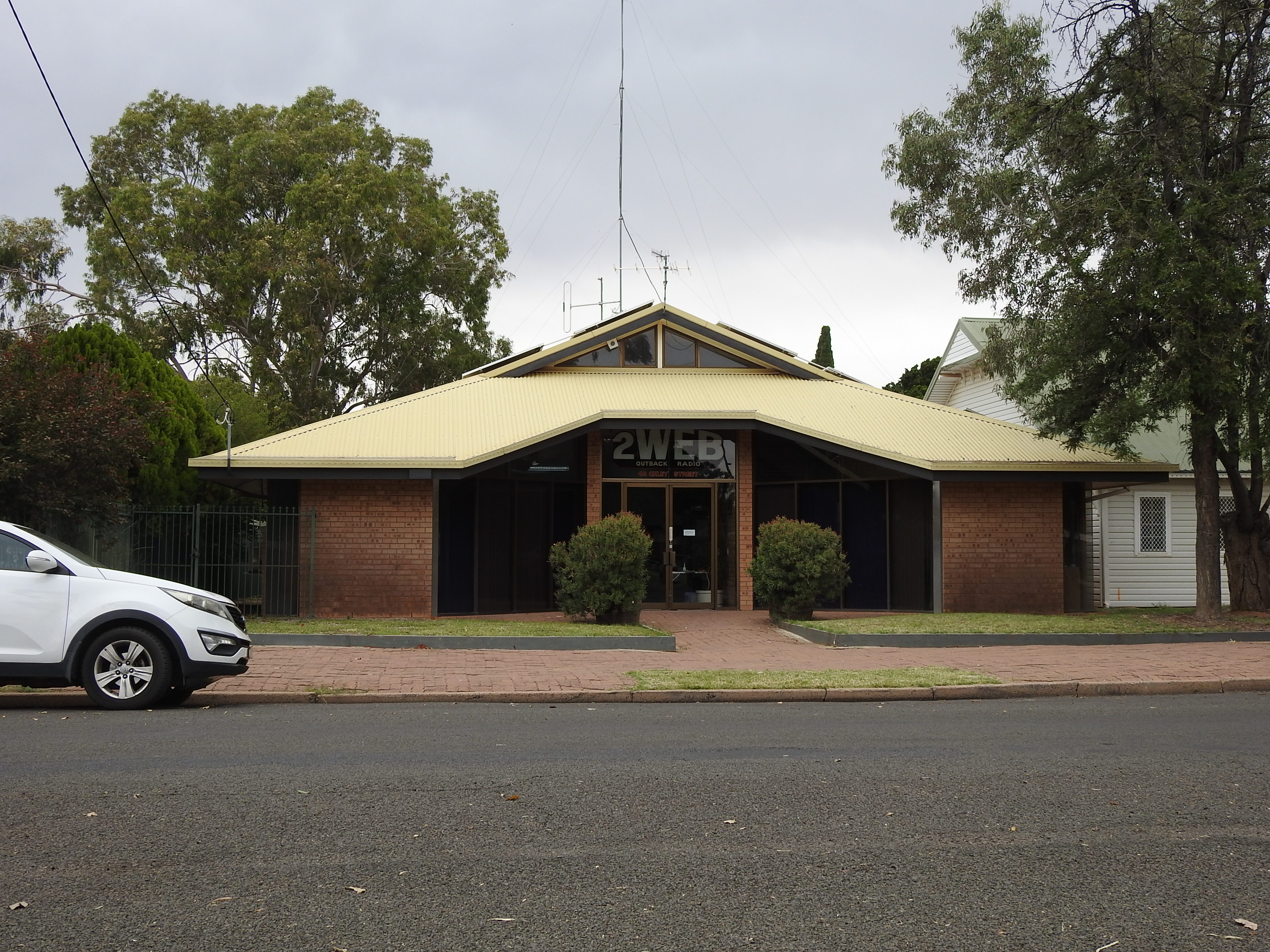
2WEB Outback Radio building, 48 Oxley Street (2021).

The town is served by these radio stations:

- ABC Western Plains on 657 AM (Regional)
- Triple M on 93.5 FM (Commercial)
- ABC RN on 101.1 FM (National)
- 2WEB on 585 AM (Community)
- 2CUZ on 106.5 FM (Indigenous Community station)

The Bourke area is served by five television stations. In common with all Australian TV stations, they now broadcast digital transmissions only, with the primary program in each case being designated as:

- QQQ, 7two, 7mate – Seven Network owned and operated channels.
- CDT, 10 Drama, 10 Comedy – an affiliate of Network 10.
- Imparja, 9Go!, 9Gem – an affiliate of the Nine Network.
- ABC TV – ABC, ABC Family, ABC Kids, ABC Entertains, ABC News
- SBS Television – SBS, SBS Viceland, SBS World Movies, SBS WorldWatch, SBS Food, NITV

Seven (formerly branded as Prime7 and Prime Television) and WIN Television both produce half-hour-long local news bulletins. Seven News (formerly Prime7 News and Prime News) screens at 6 pm, while WIN News screens at 5:30 pm from Monday to Friday. Nine News Central West was an hour-long bulletin that mixed local and national news, broadcast on the Southern Cross Austereo primary channel, when it was a Nine affiliate.

The local paper, The Western Herald, is published on a weekly basis (every Thursday) year-round, except during a short break at Christmas.

== Gallery ==
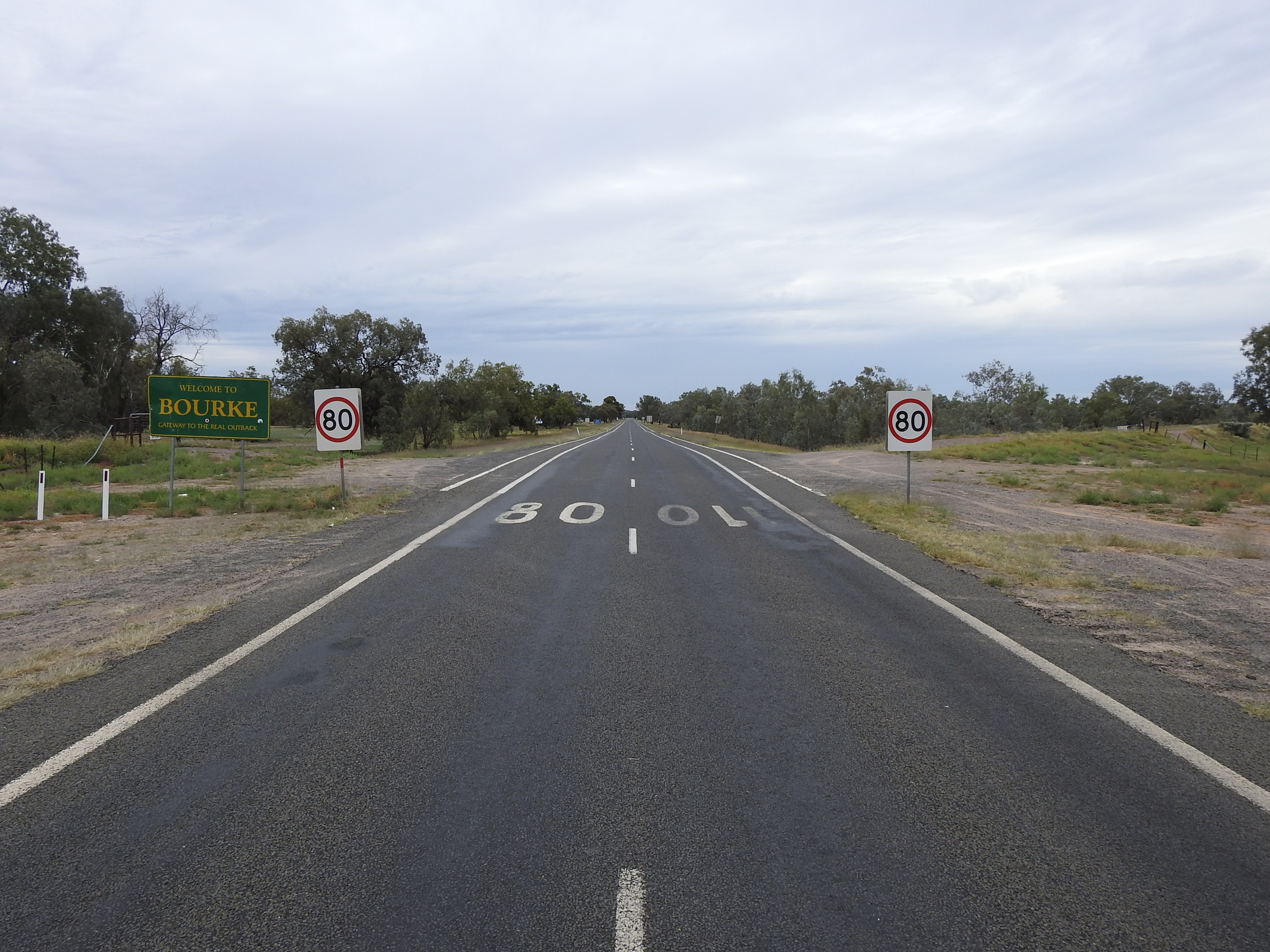
Town sign, southern approach from Kidman Way (2021).

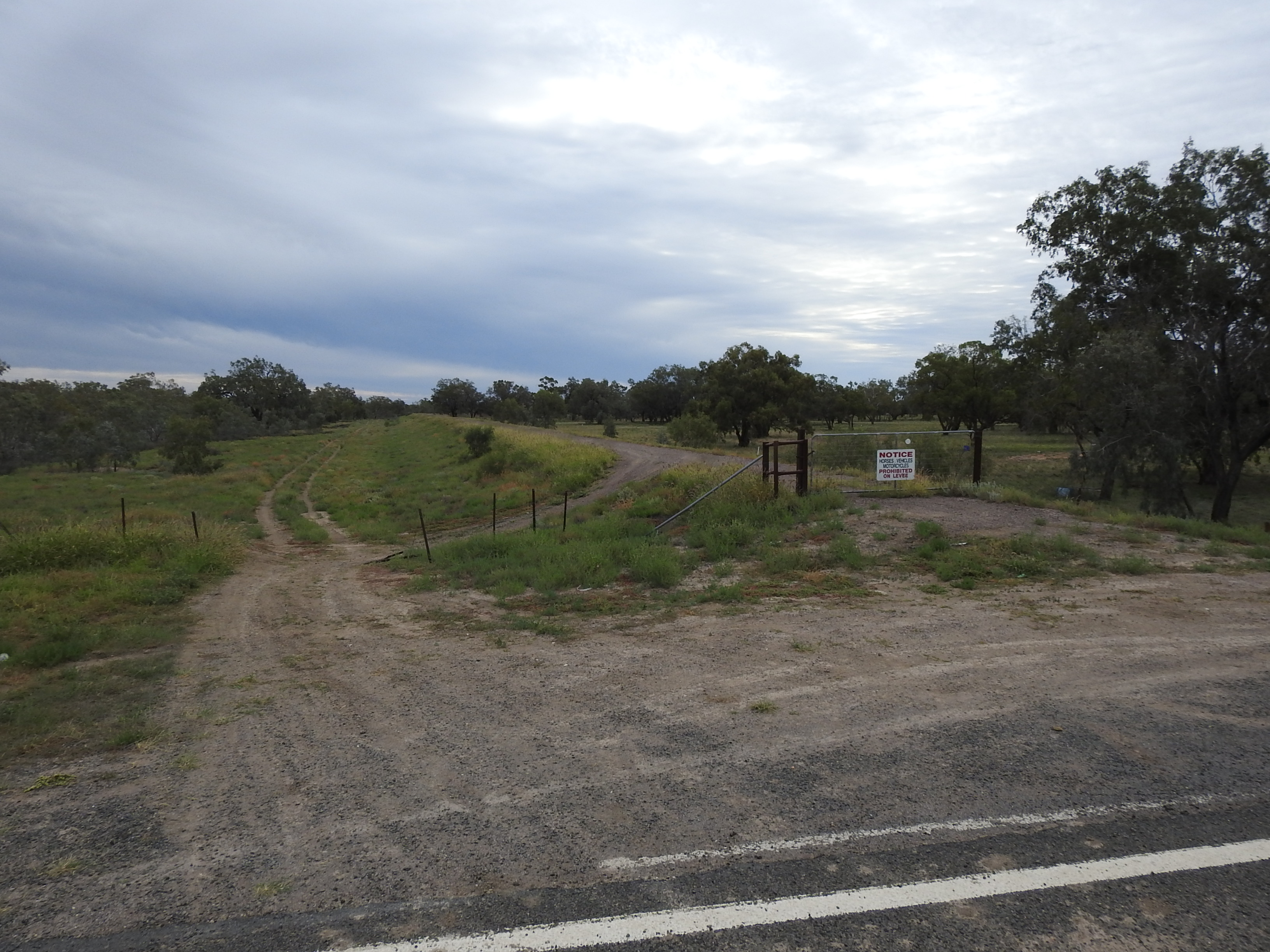
Levee bank on southern side of town (2021).

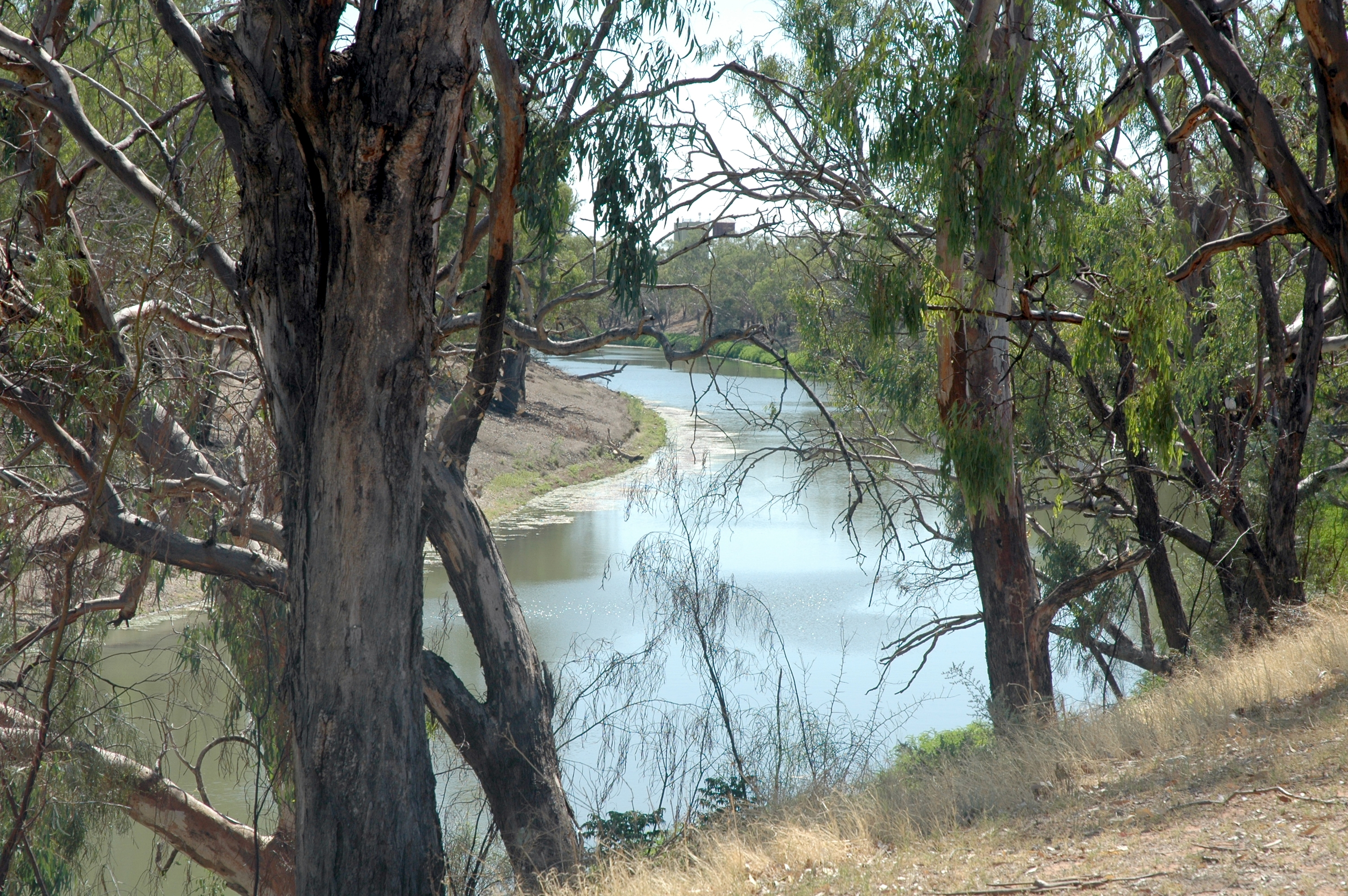
The Darling River from Bourke Wharf (2010).

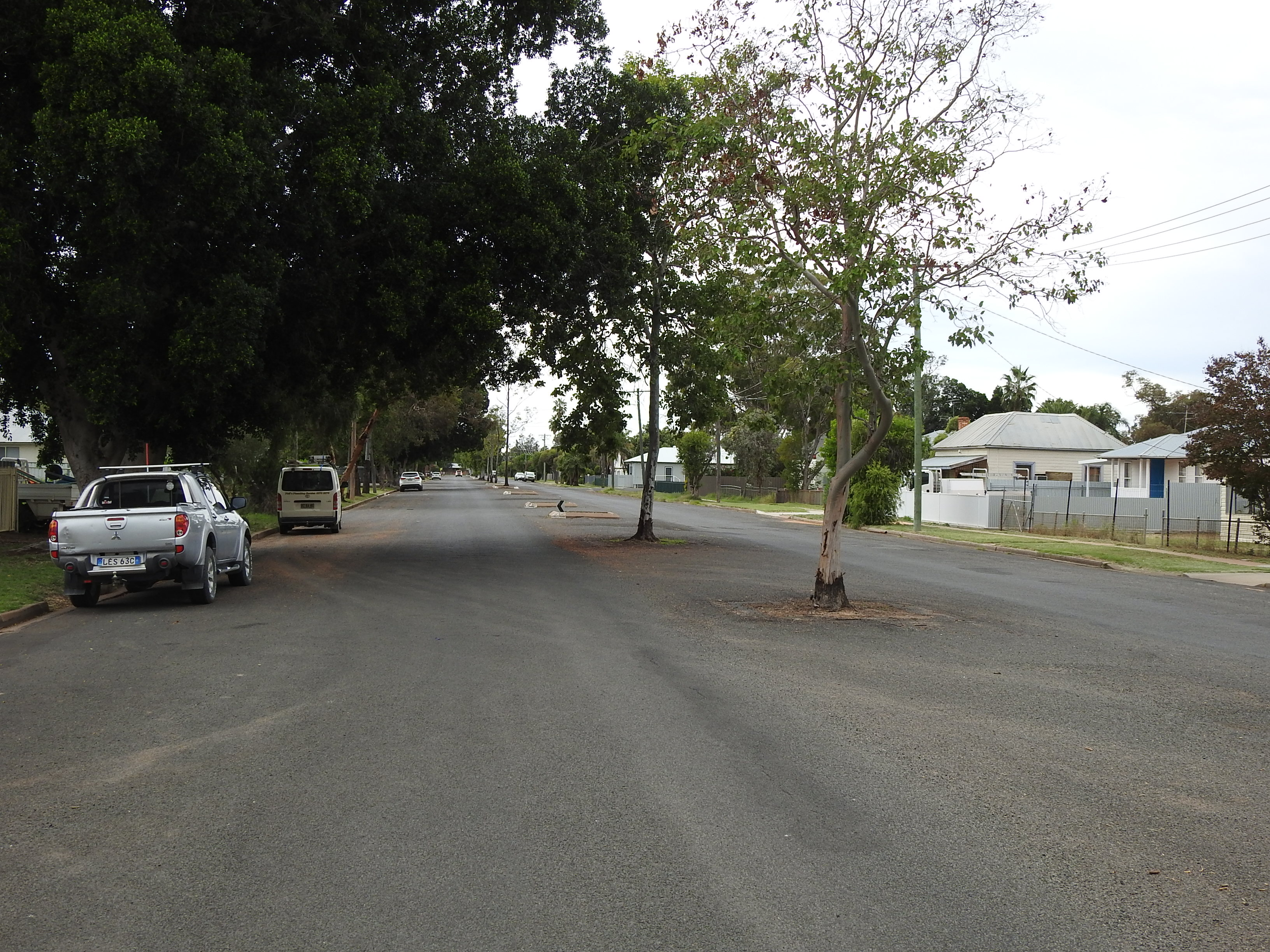
Oxley Street scene (2021).

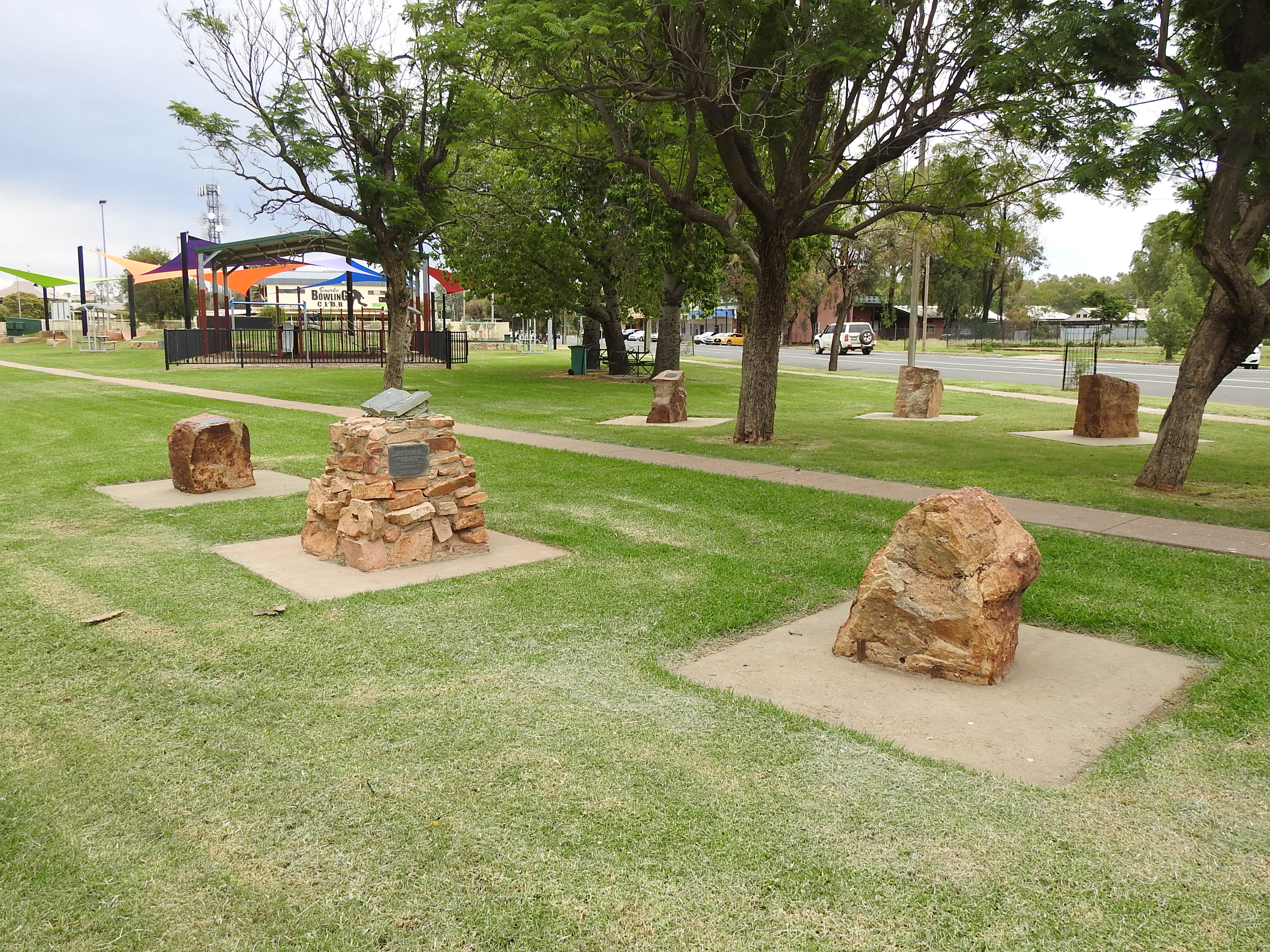
Poets Corner of Central Park (2021).

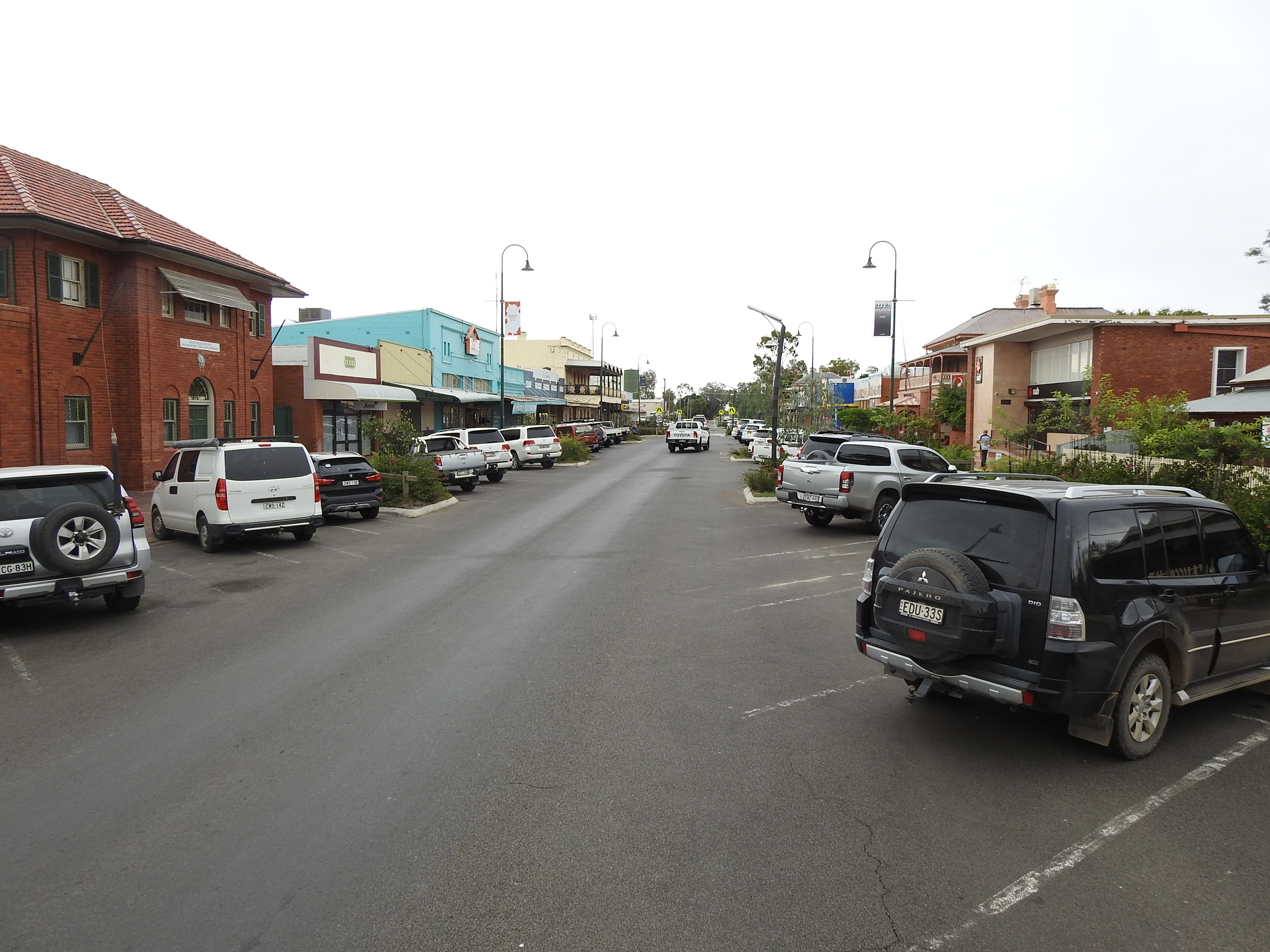
Oxley Street town centre (2021).

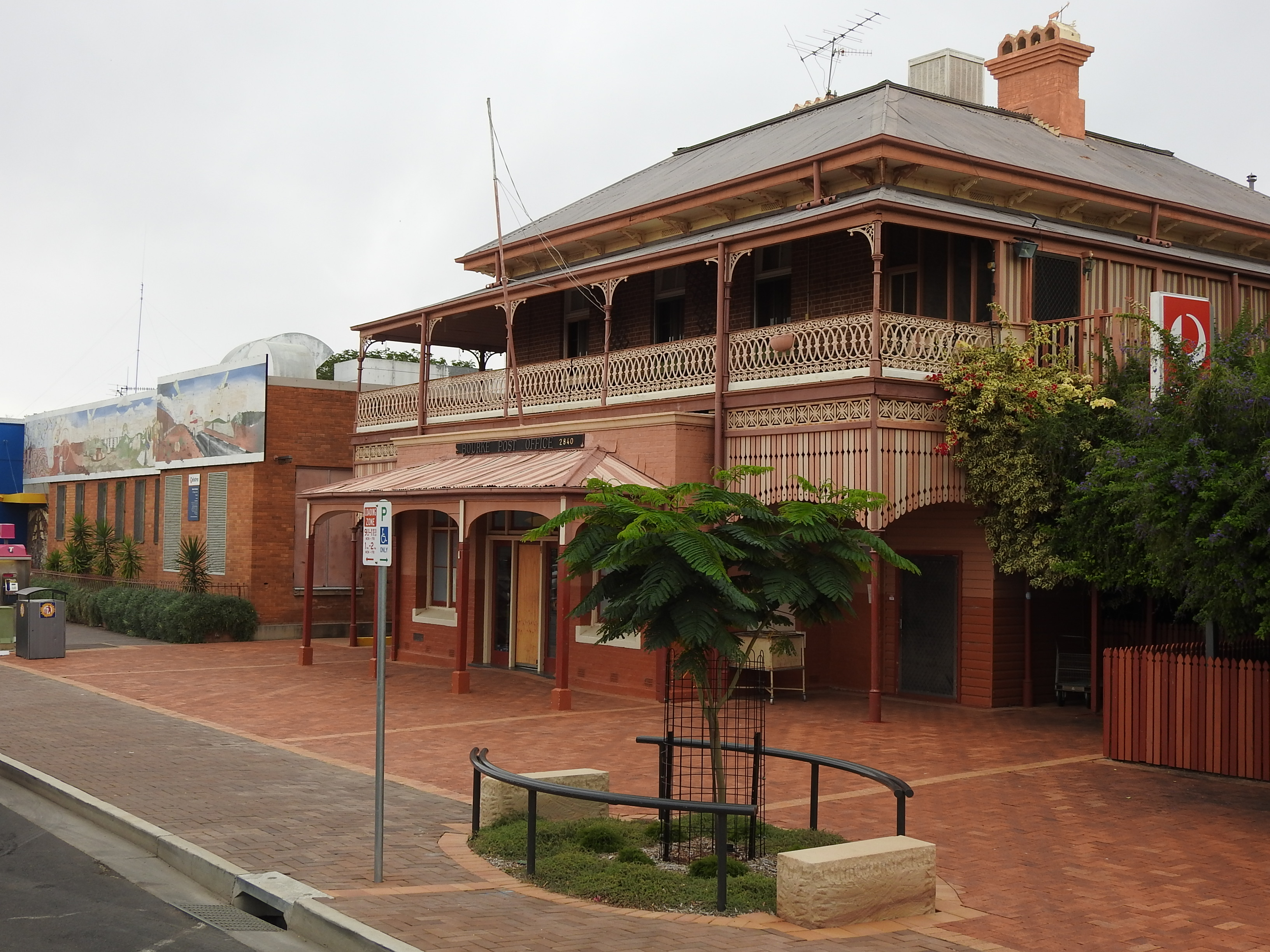
Australia Post office (2021).

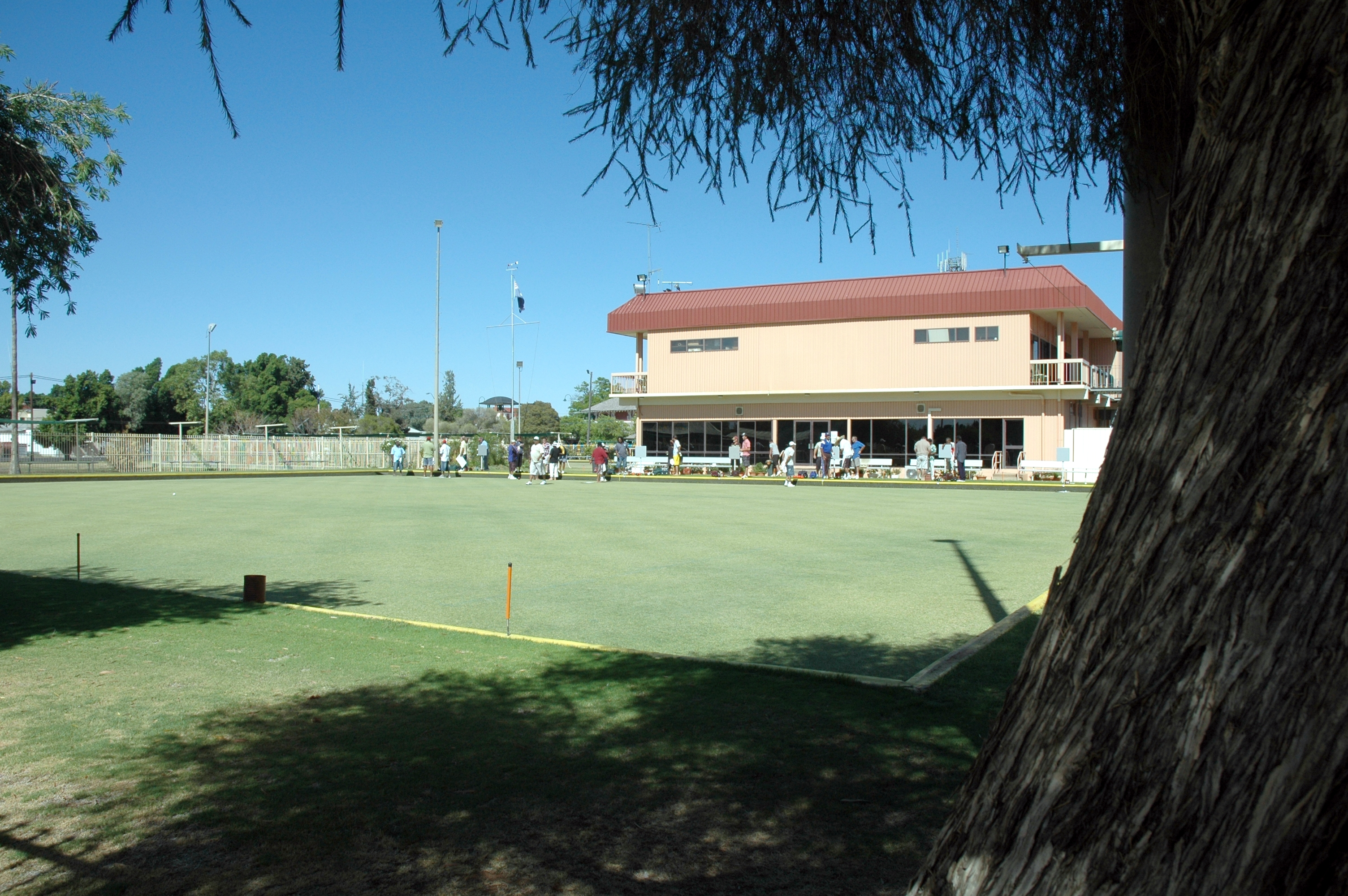
Bourke Bowls Club on a Sunday morning

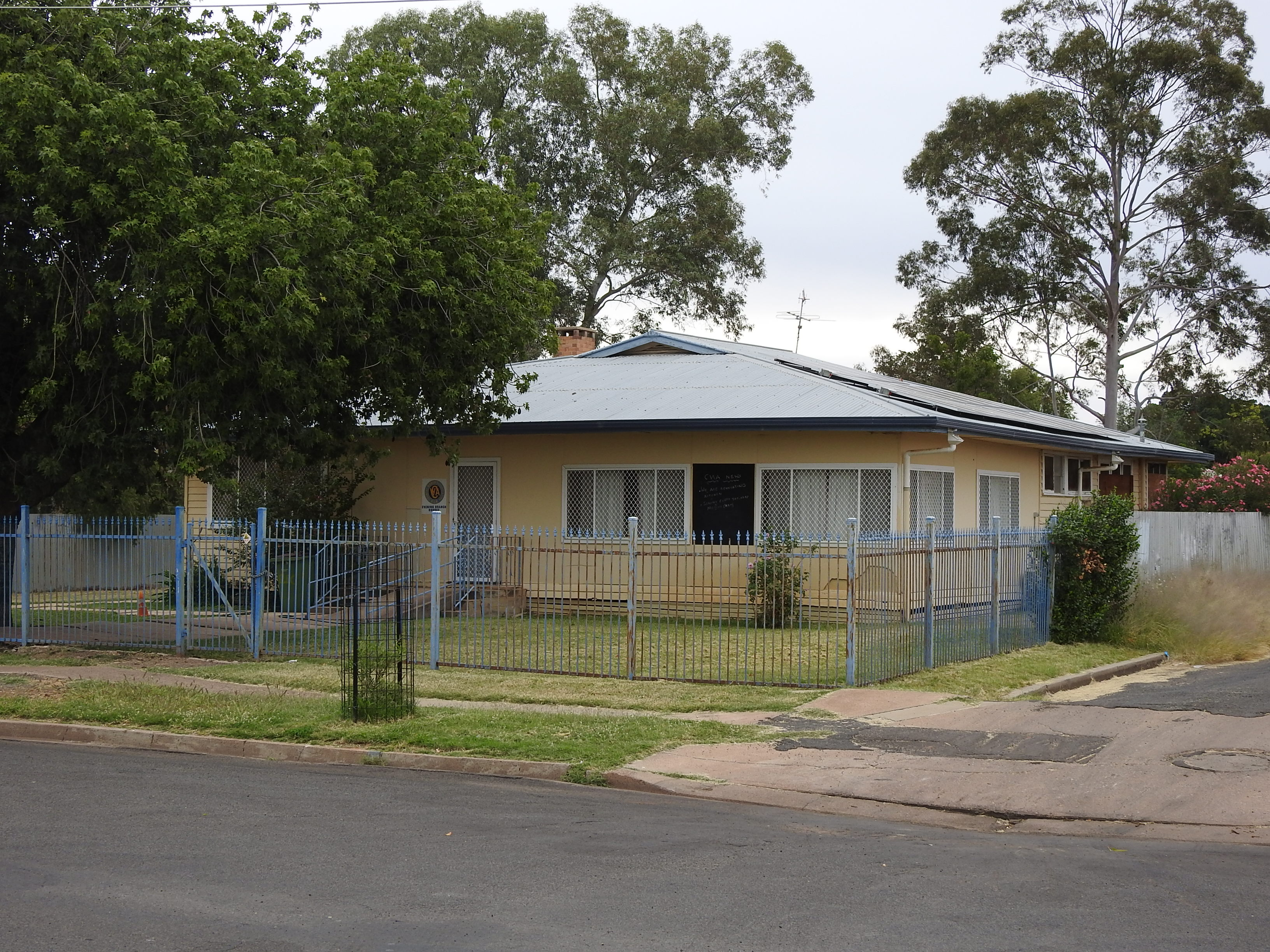
Country Women's Association rest room (2021).

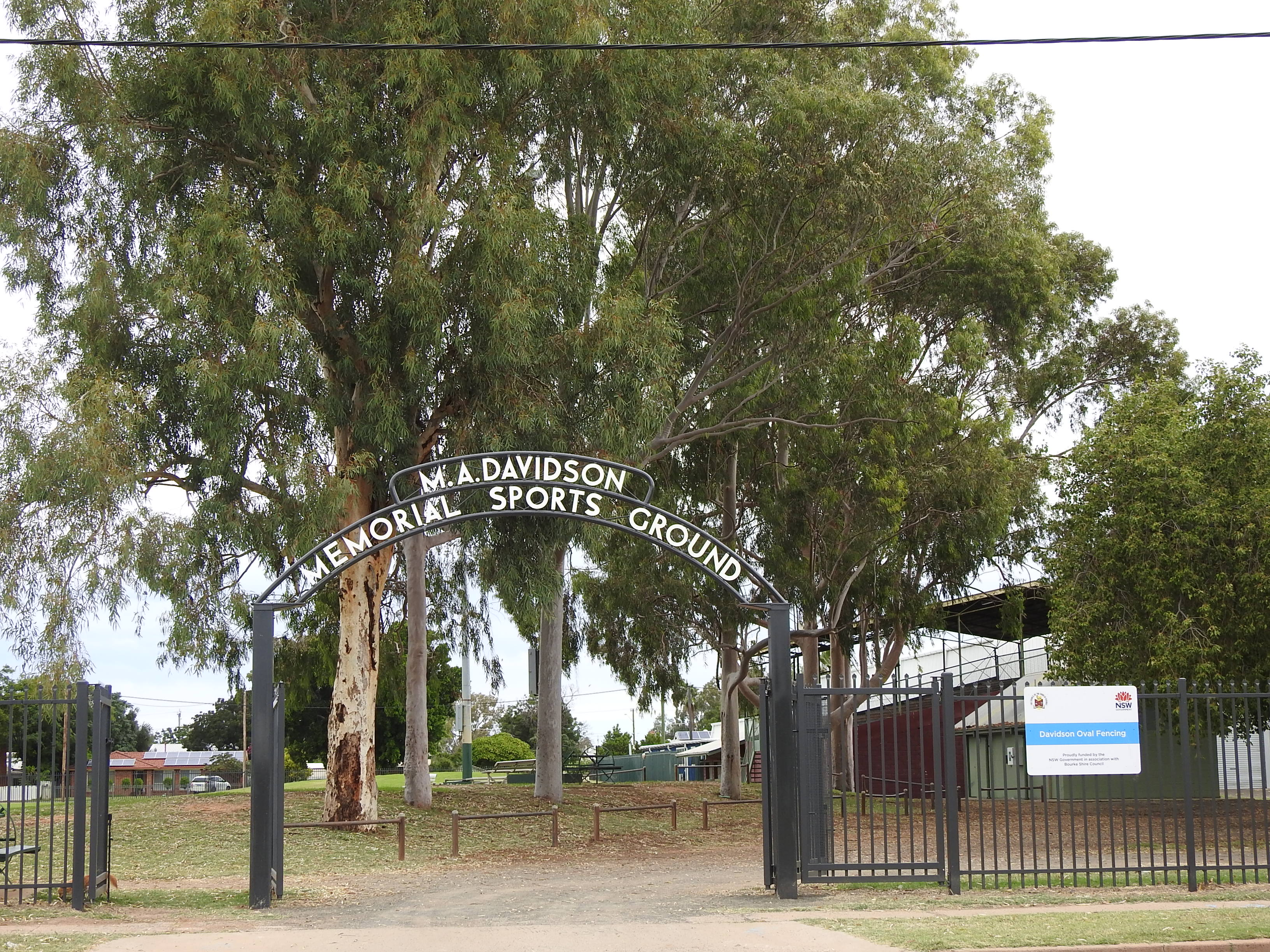
M A Davidson Memorial Sports Ground (2021).

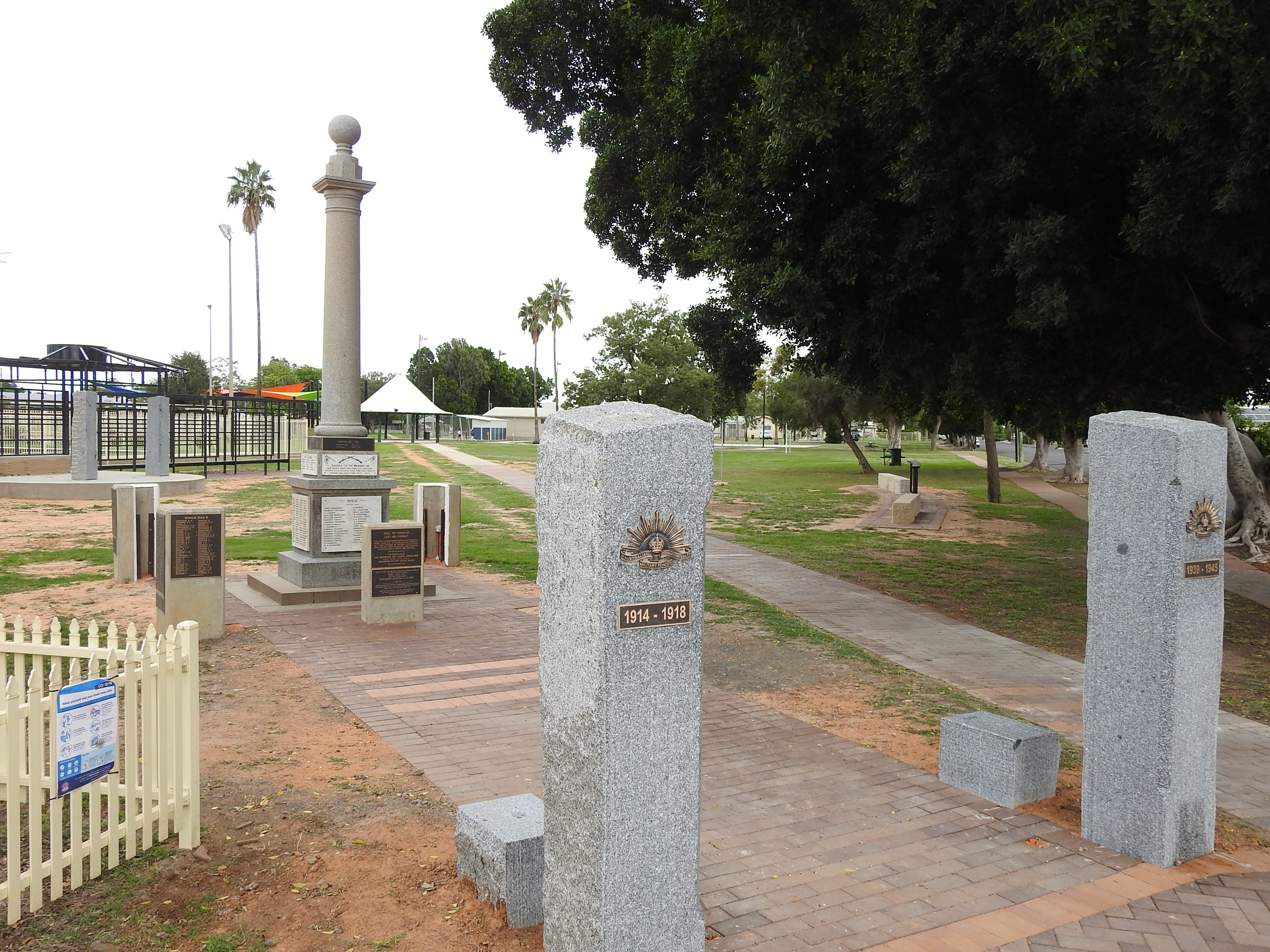
War memorial (2021).

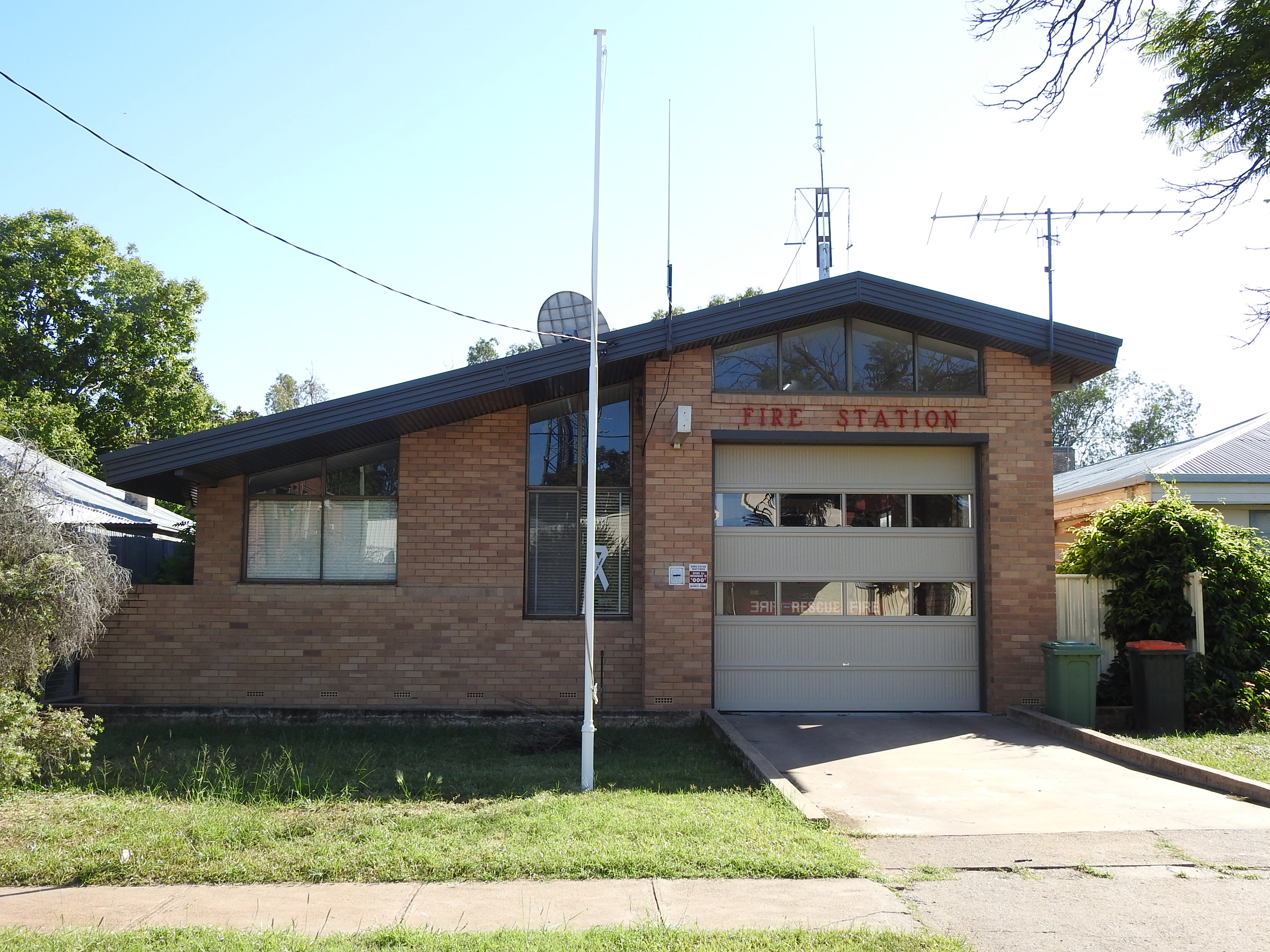
Fire station (2021).

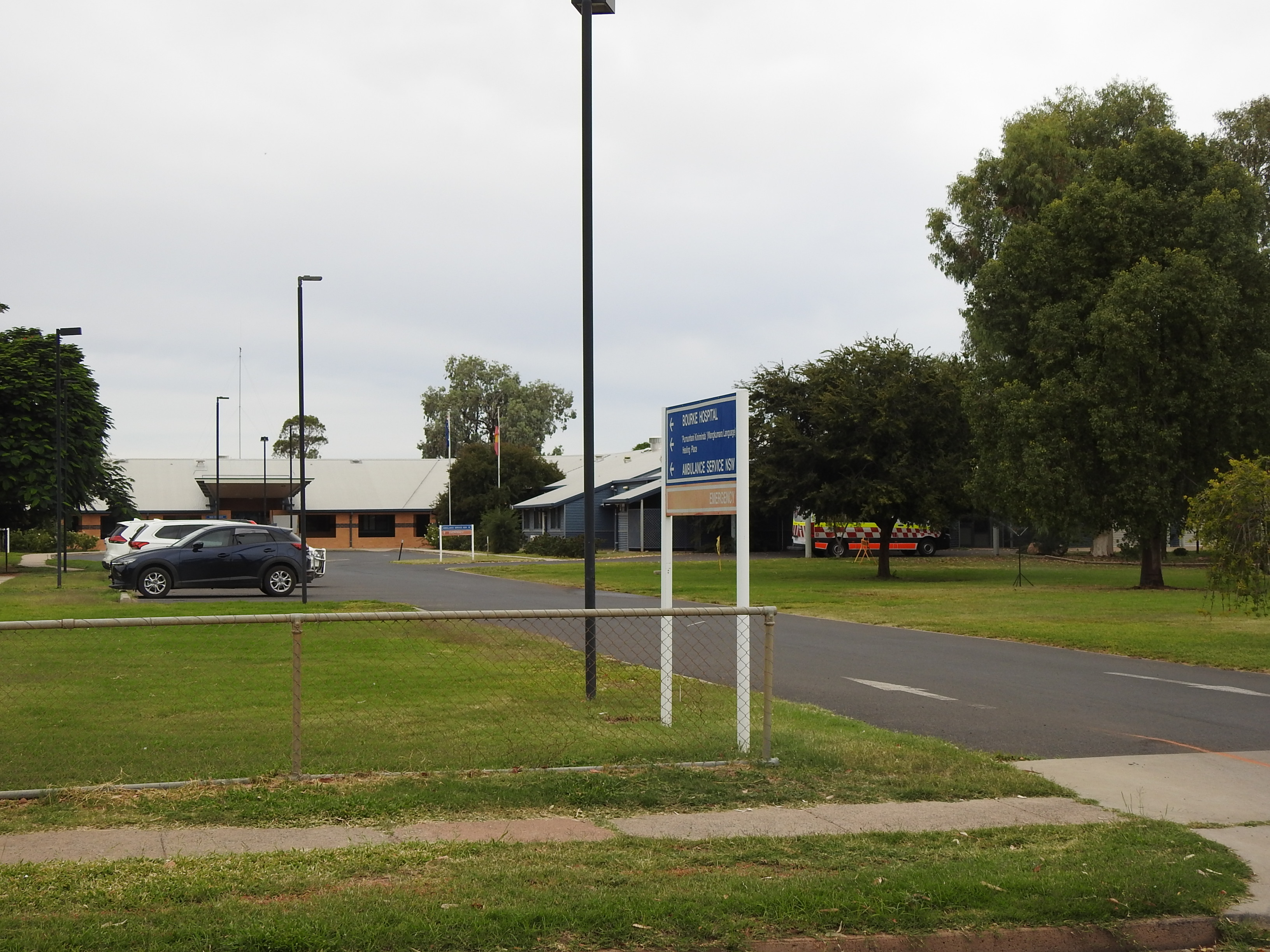
Bourke District Hospital, Tarcoon Street (2021).

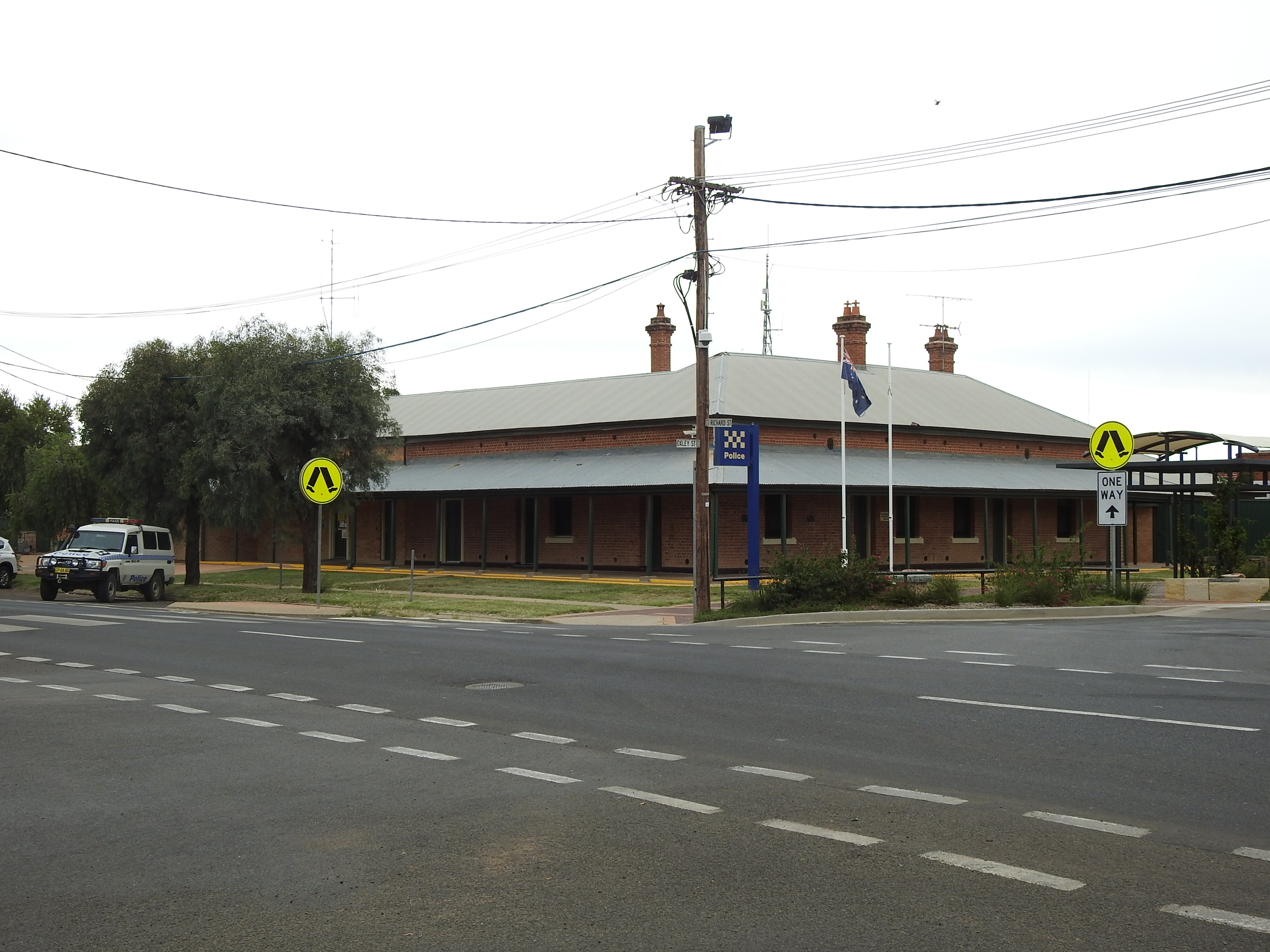
NSW Police Force police station (2021).

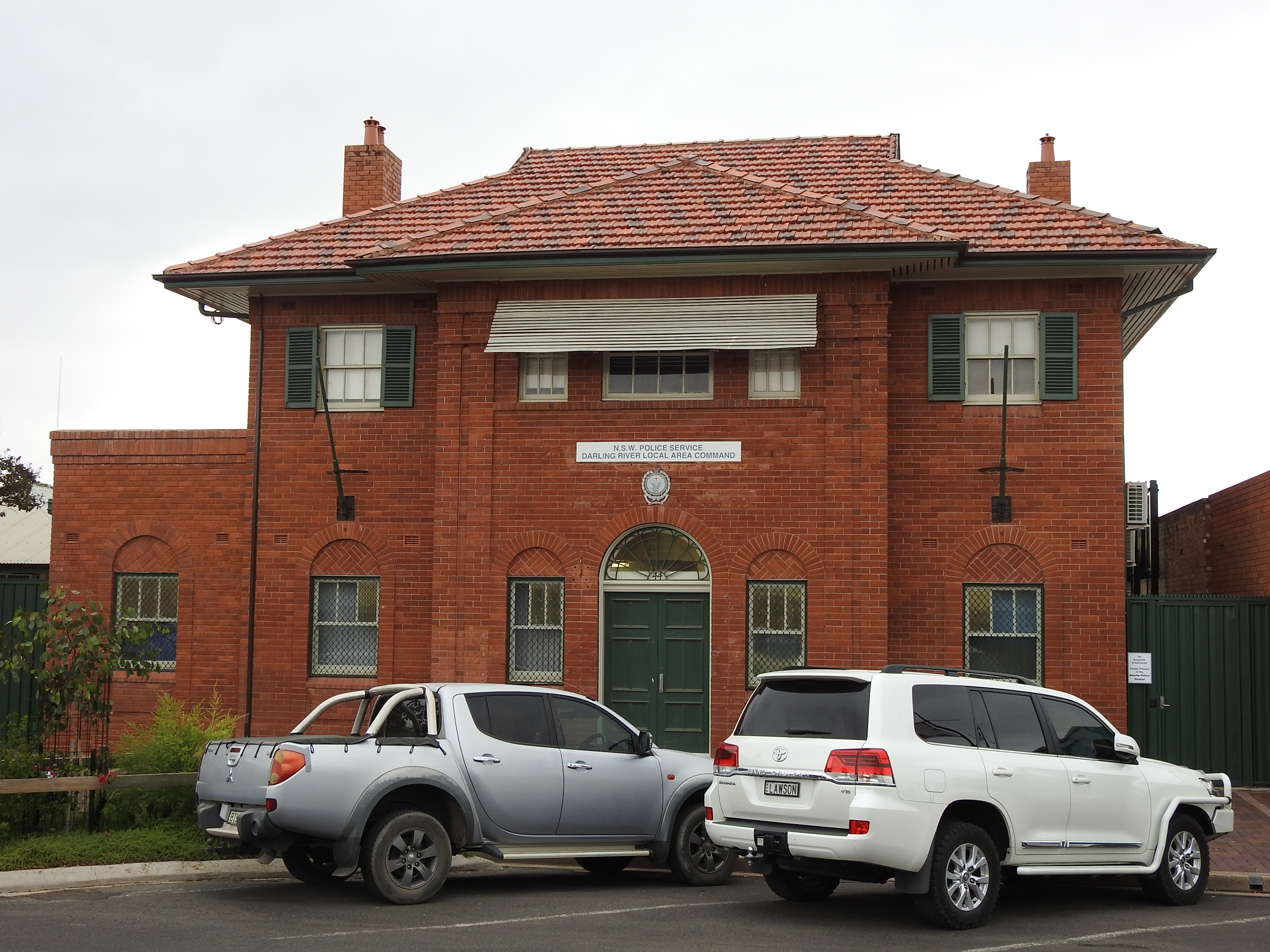
NSW Police local area command (2021).

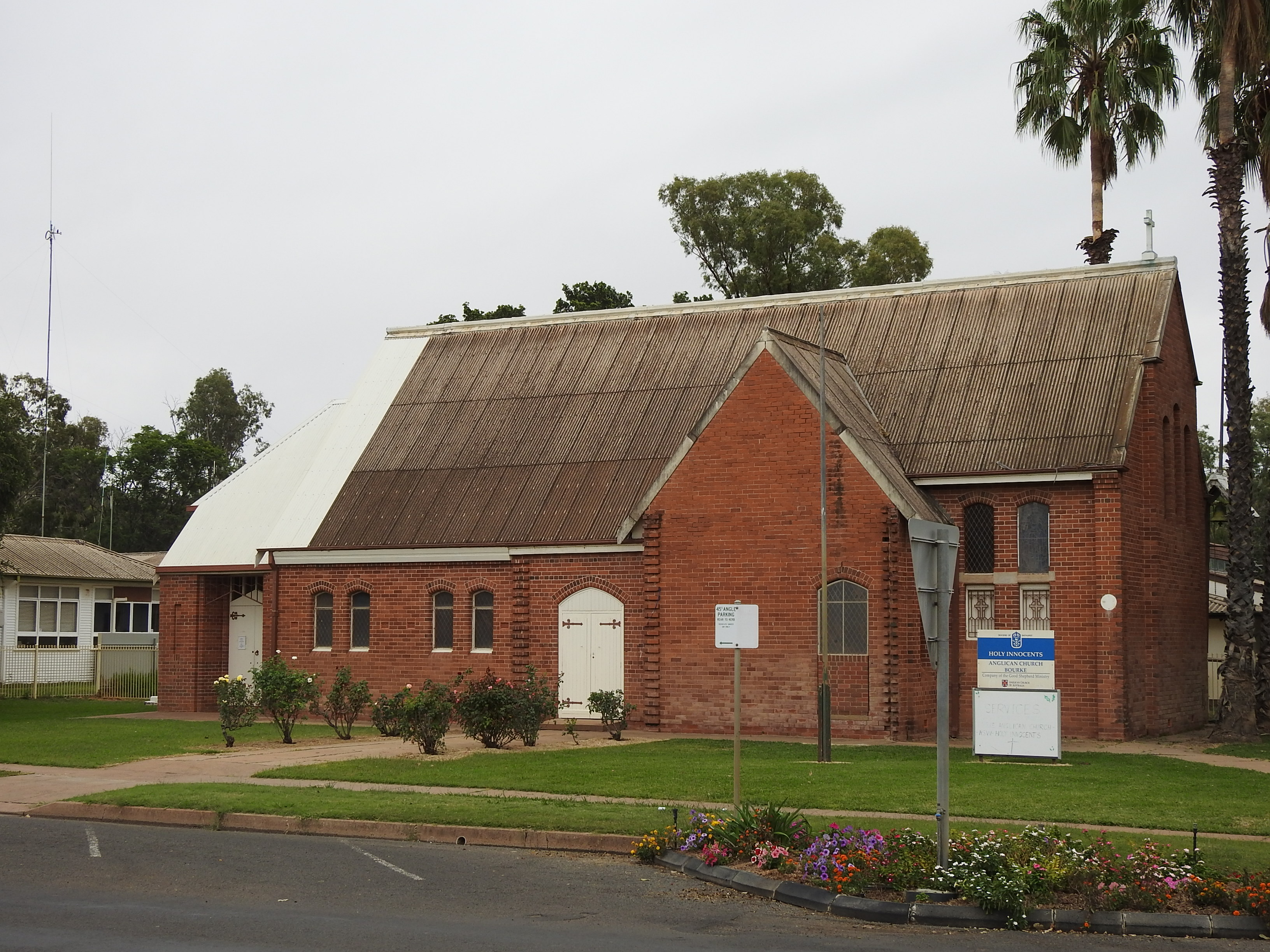
Anglican church (2021).

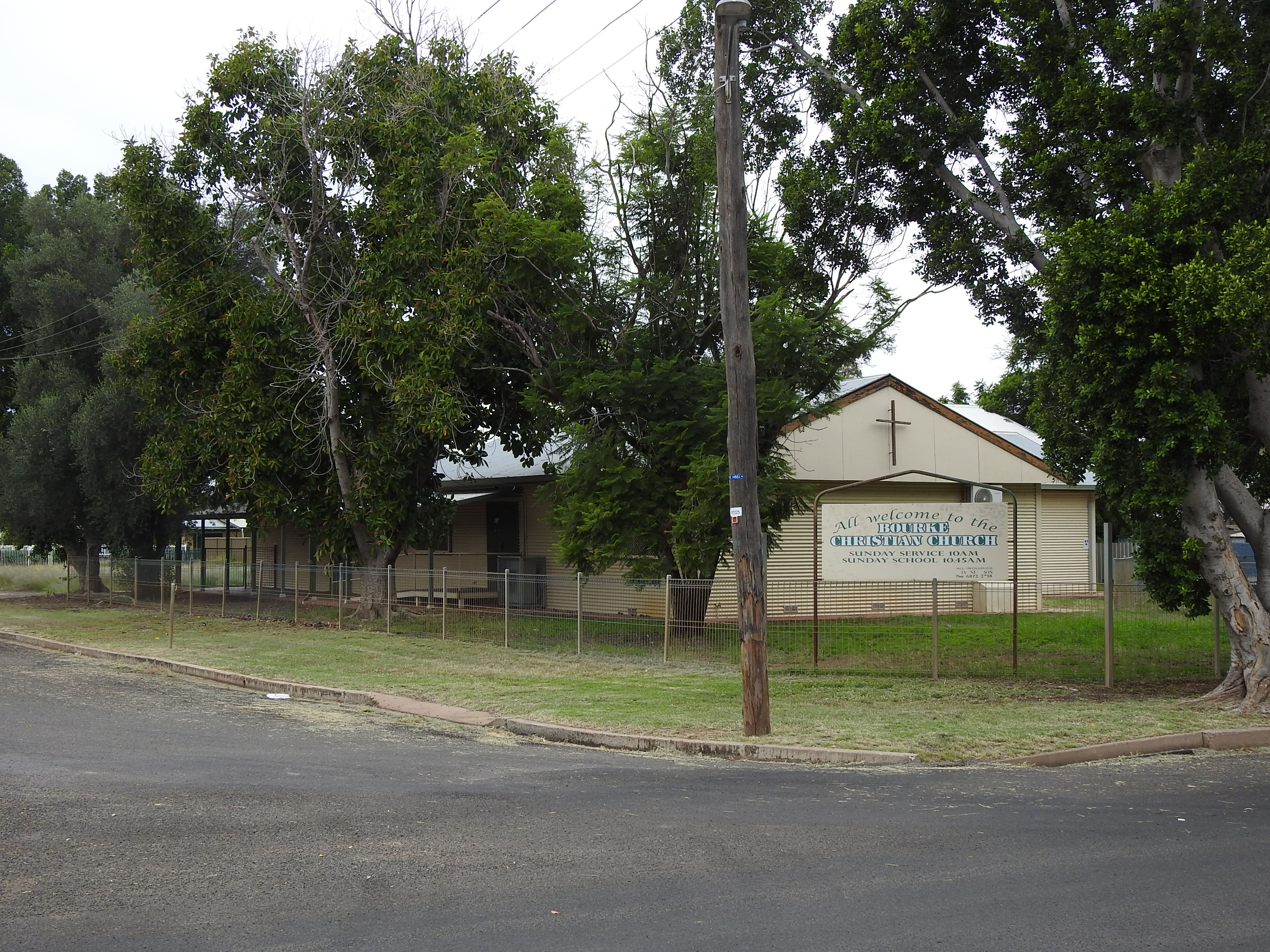
Bourke Christian Church (2021).

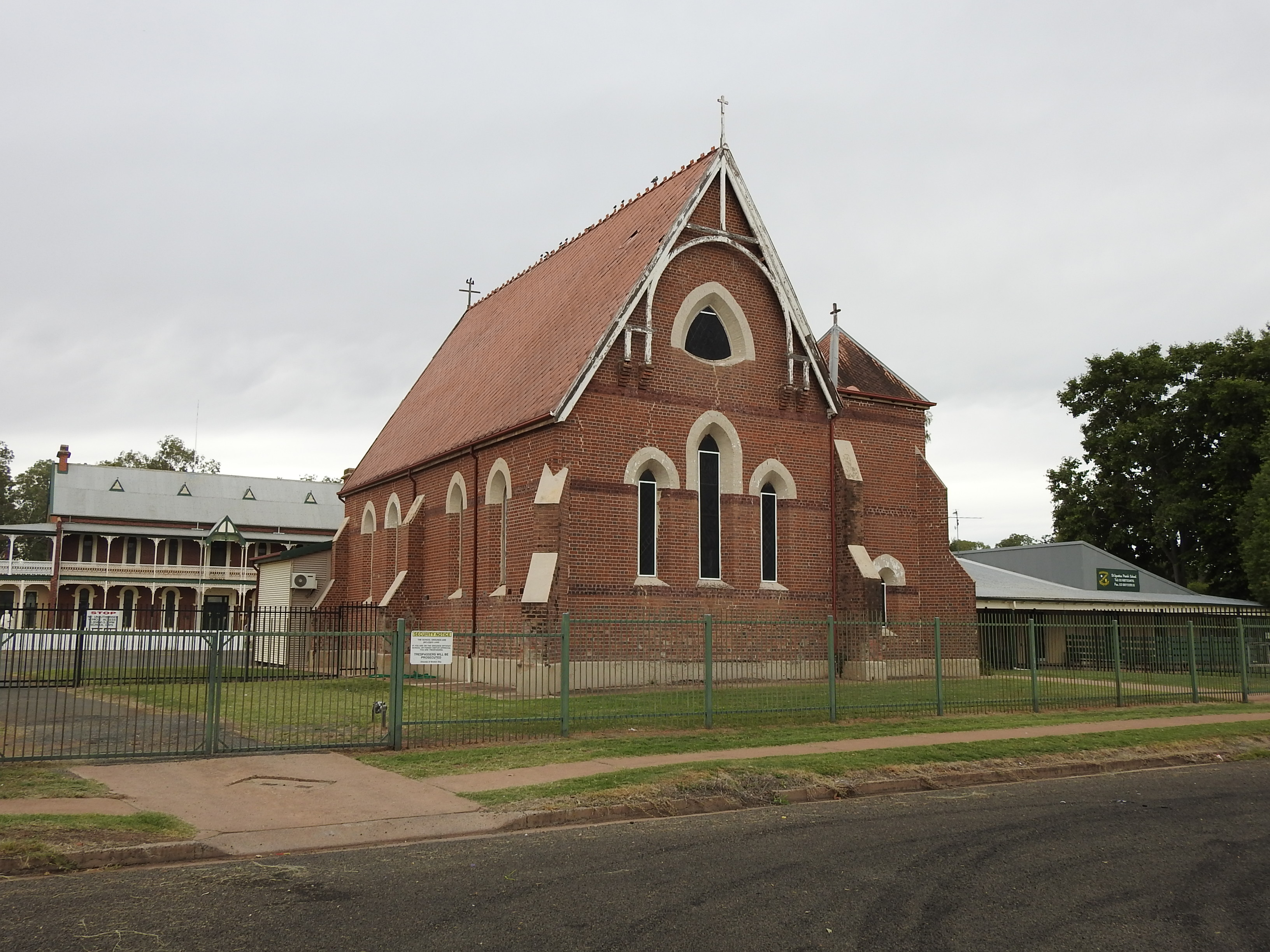
Catholic church (2021).

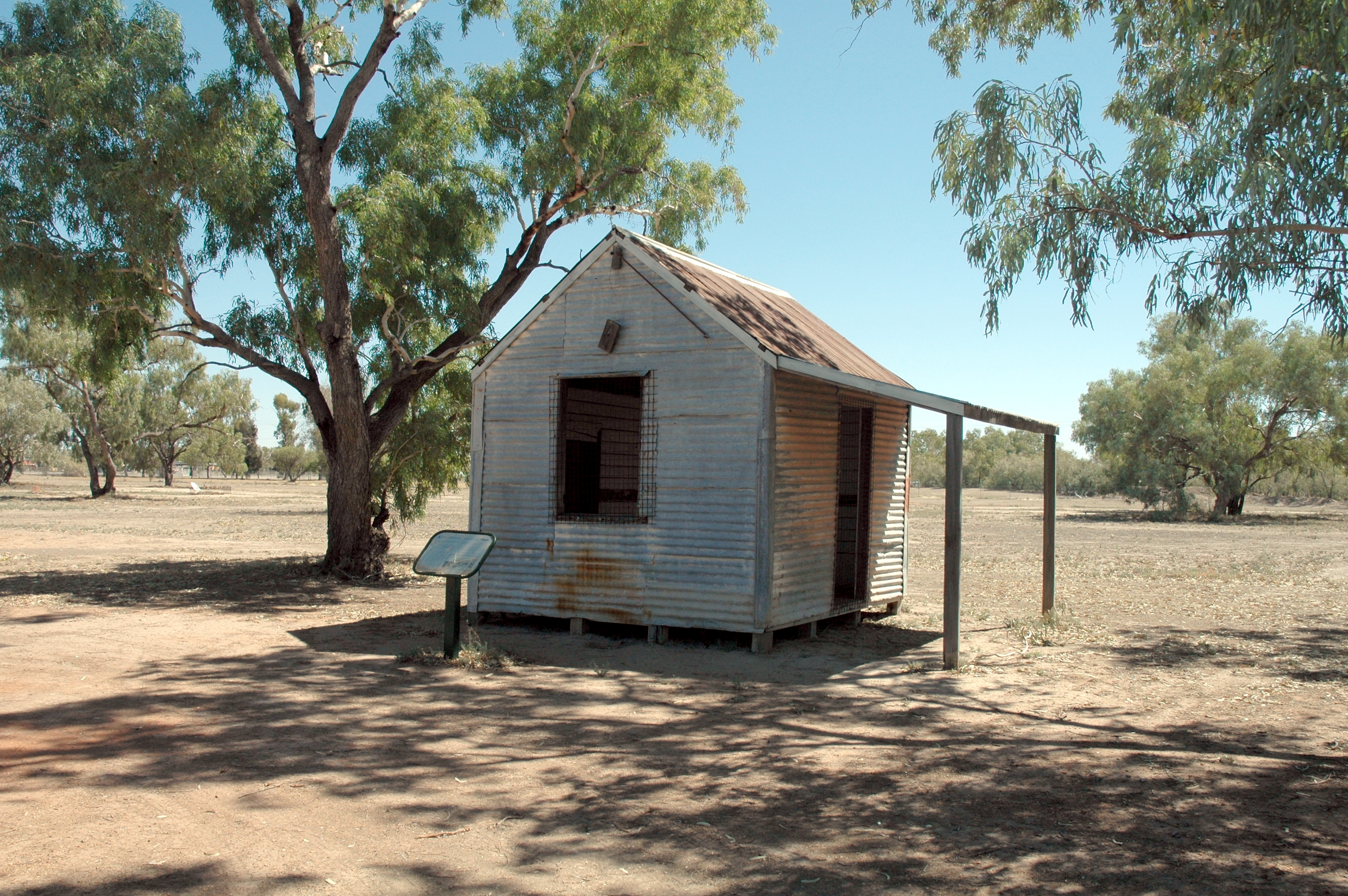
Mosque in Bourke cemetery. 19th-century Bourke was home to many Afghan camel keepers

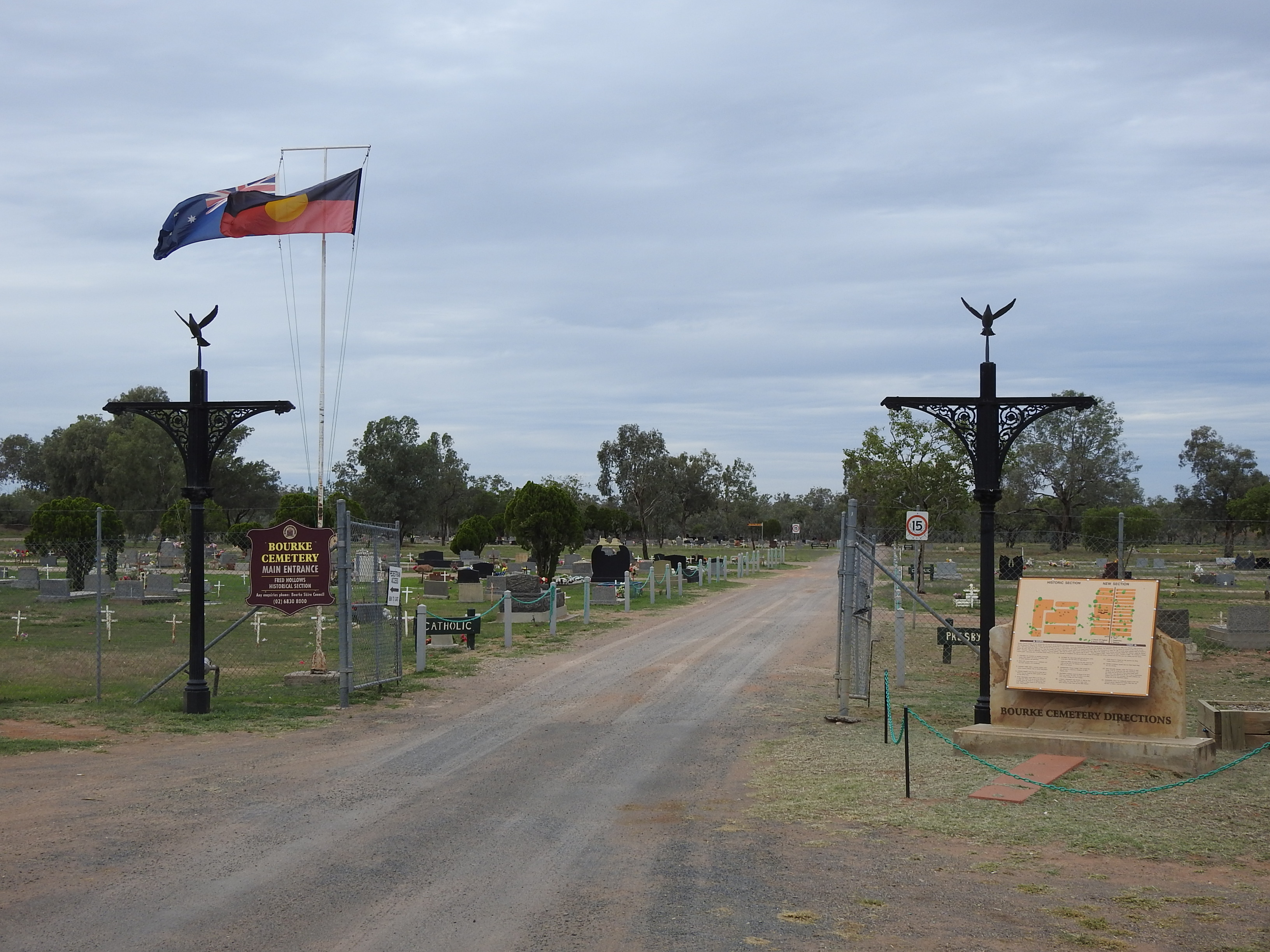
Town cemetery, Gorrell Avenue/Kidman Way (2021).

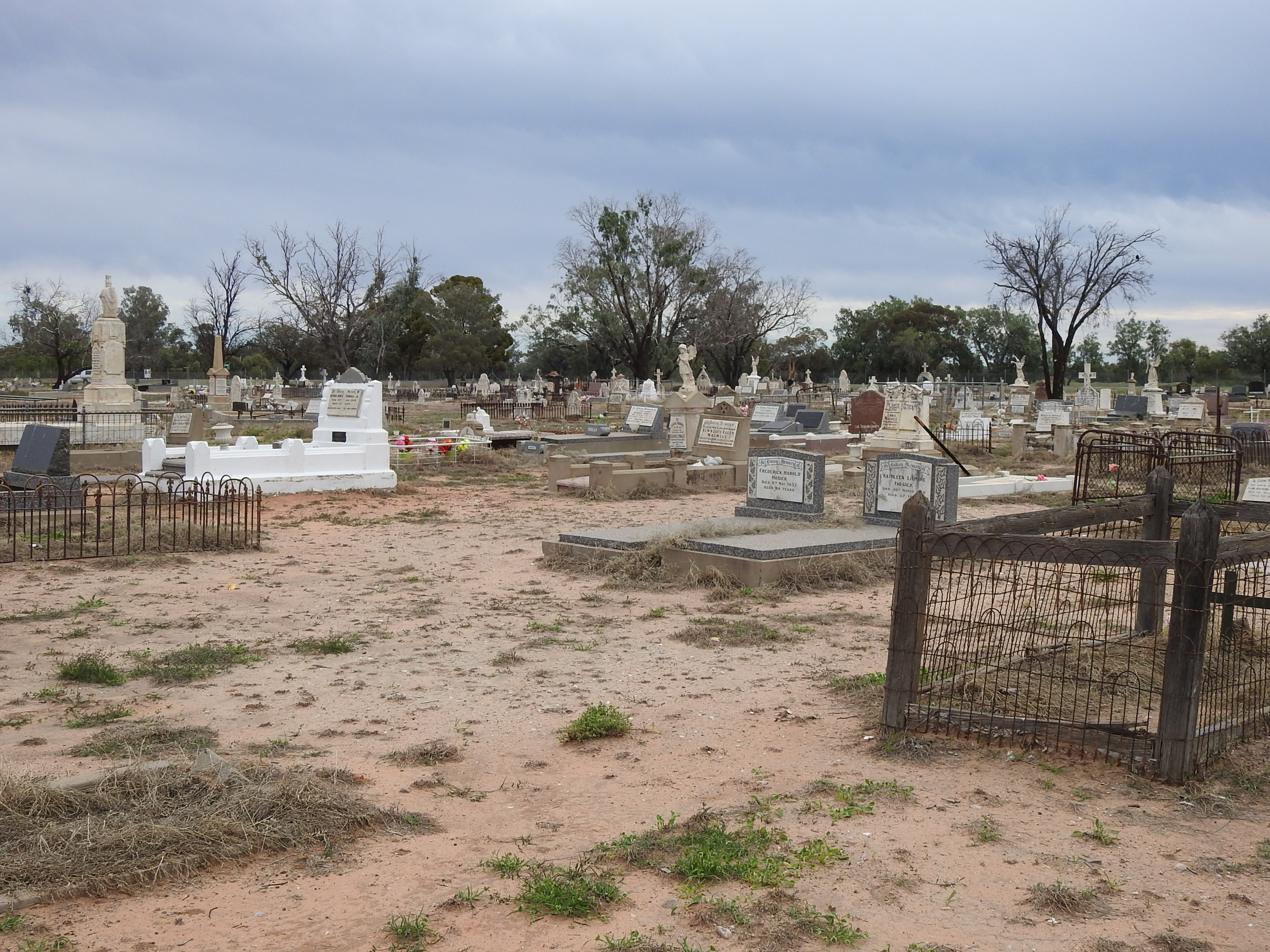
Headstones of the old section of the Bourke Cemetery, Gorrell Avenue (2021).

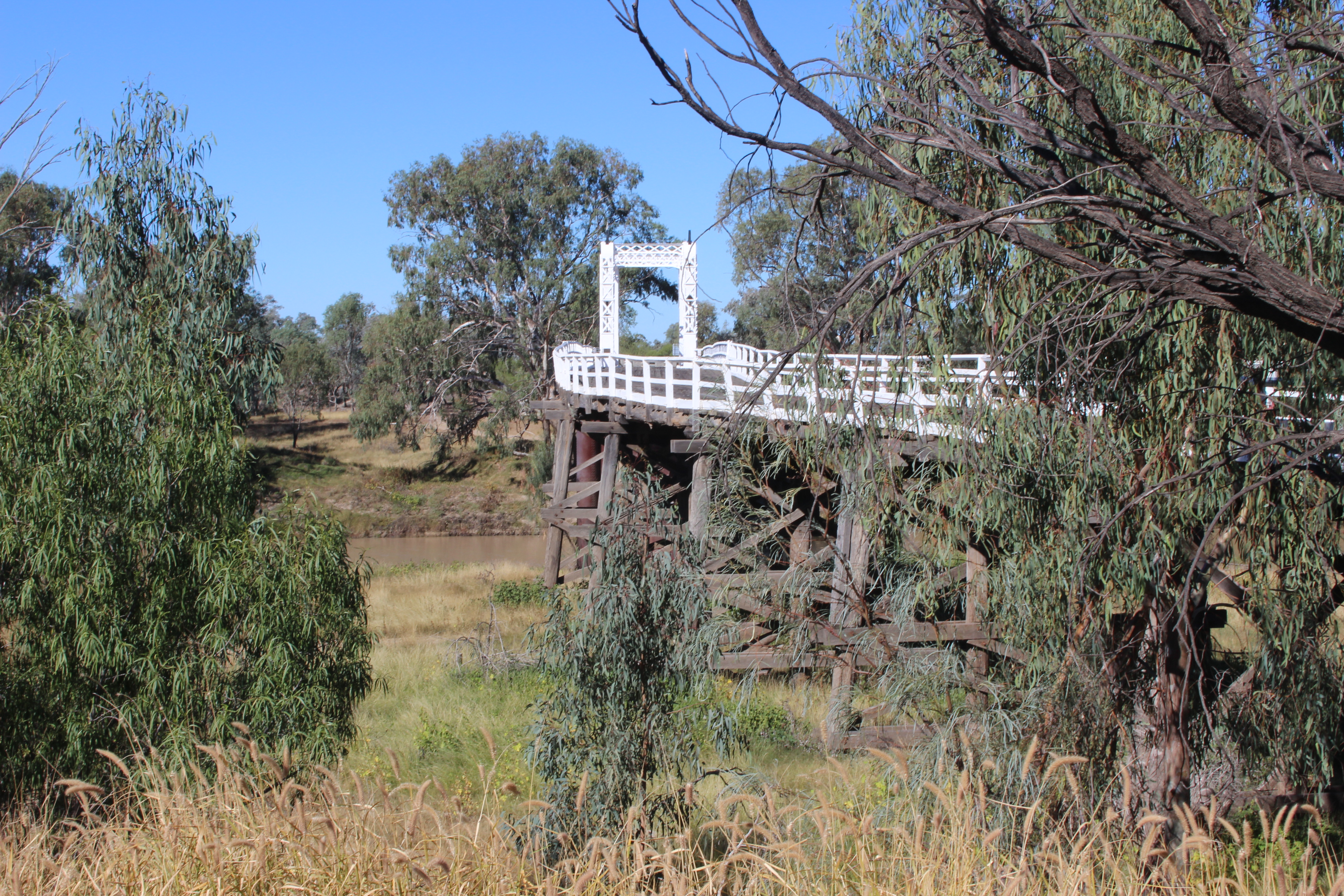
Old North Bourke Bridge, opened in 1883 (2014).

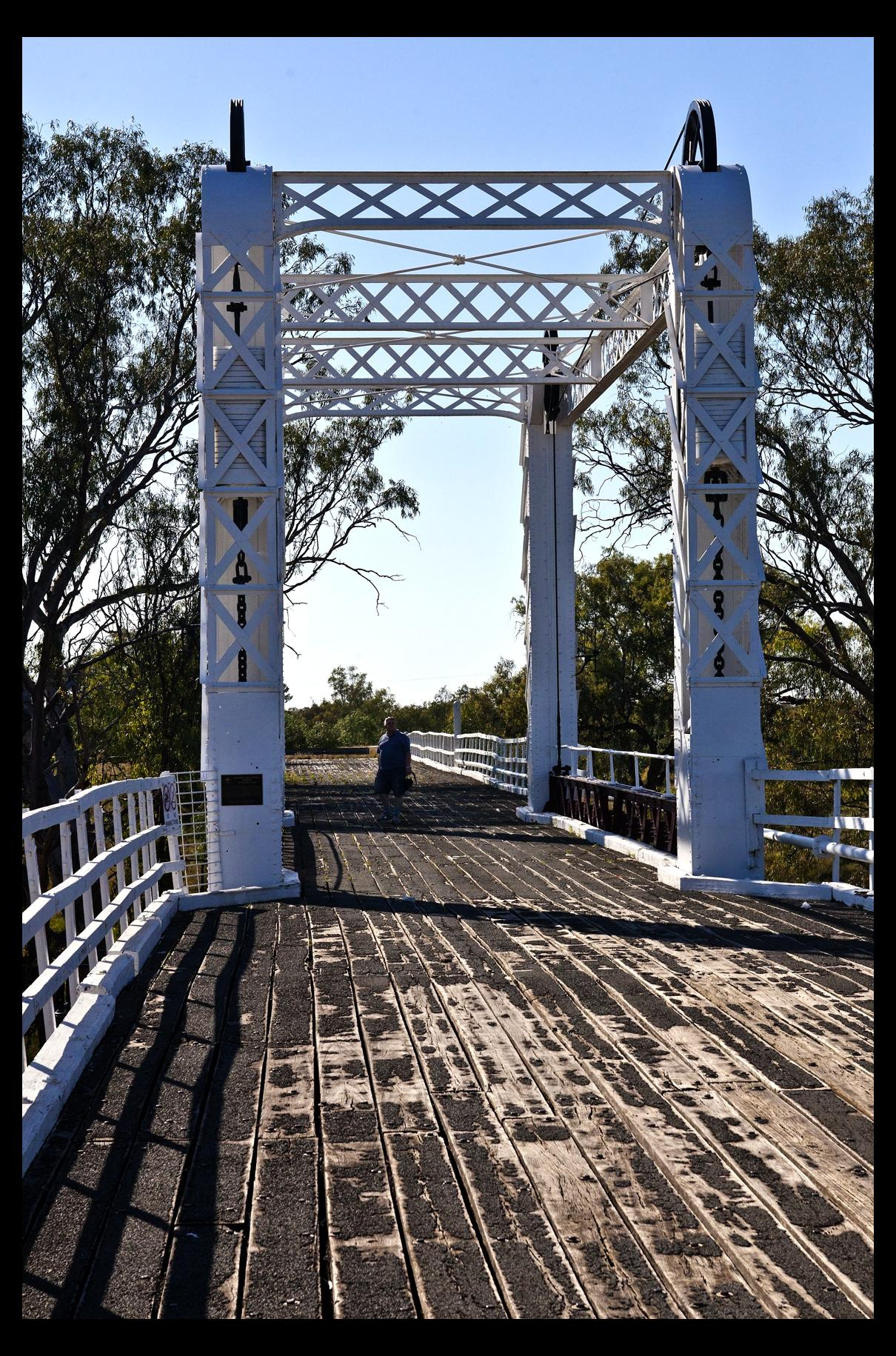
Lifting span of the old North Bourke Bridge.

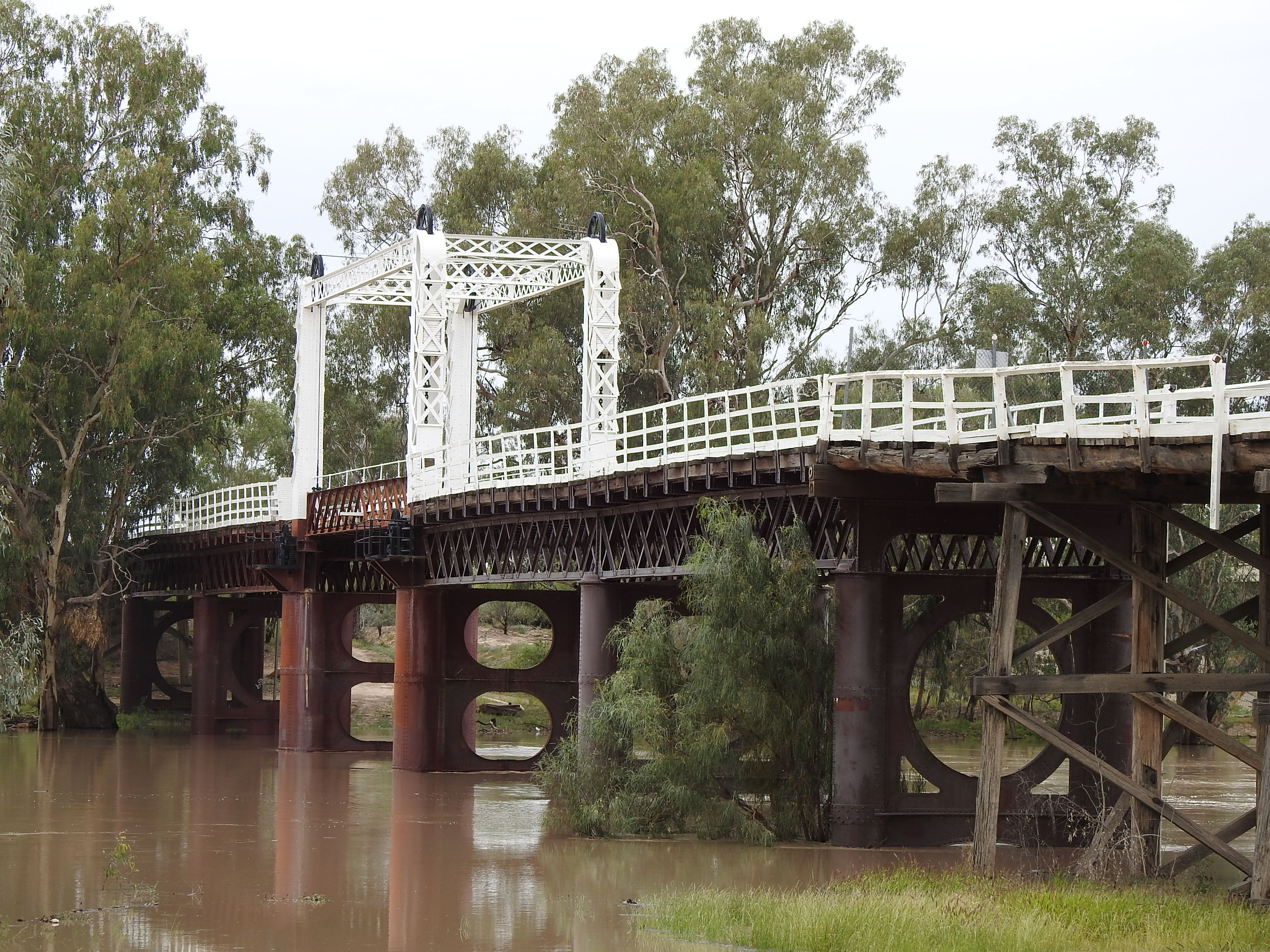
Old North Bourke bridge, in flood, northern side, North Bourke (2021).

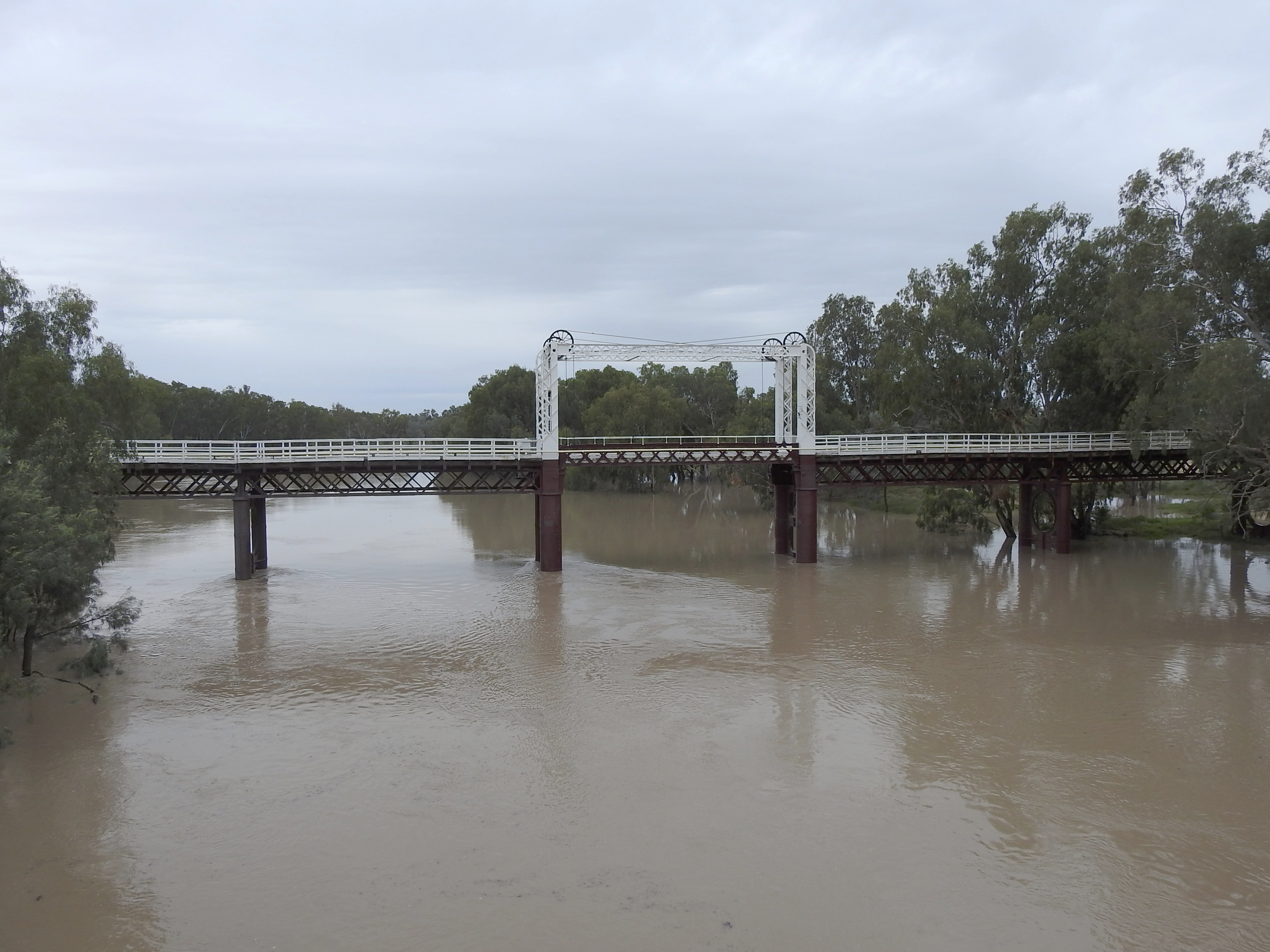
Old North Bourke bridge, in flood, southern side, North Bourke (2021).

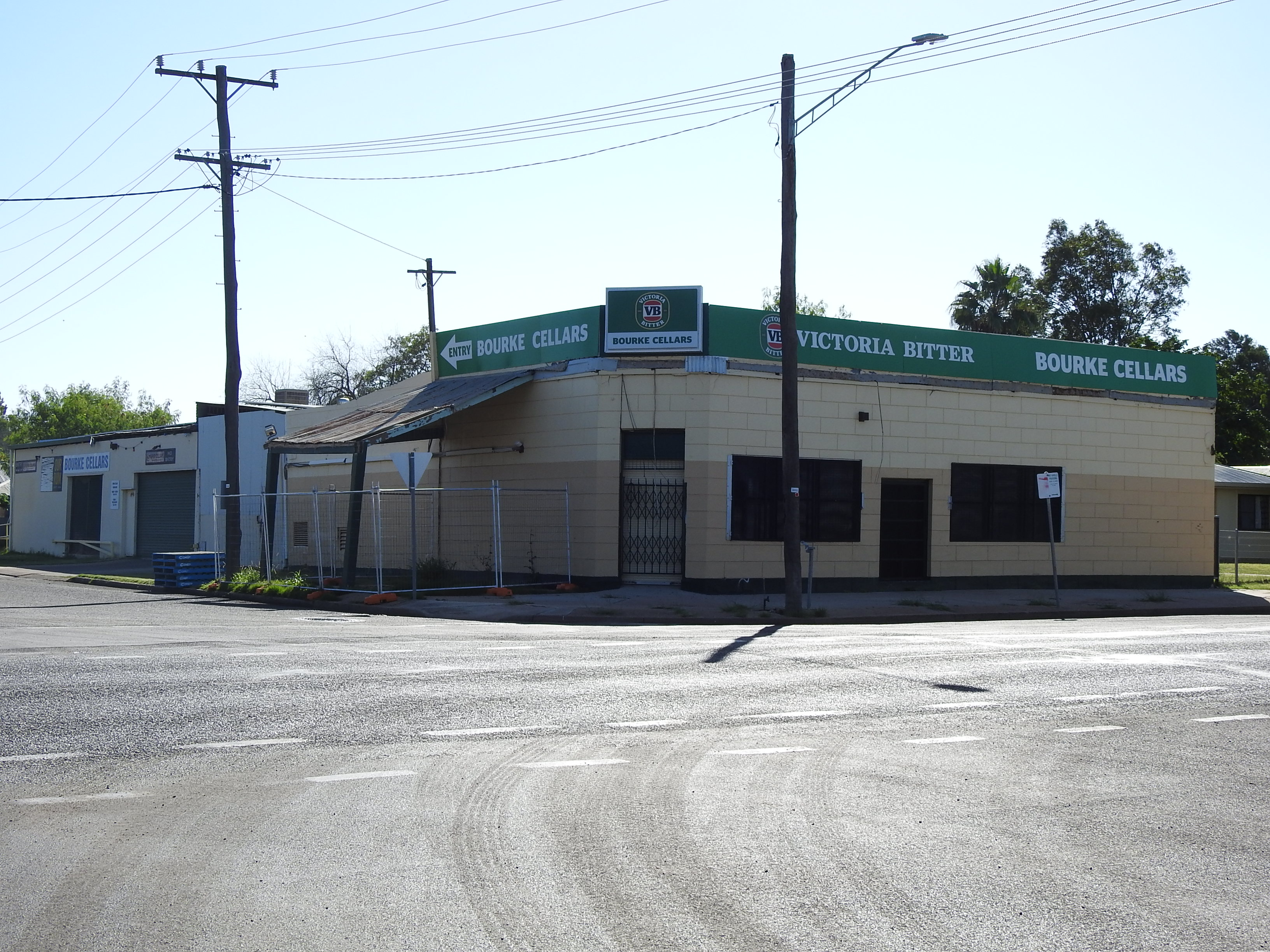
Bourke Cellars, the former Shakespeare Hotel, Mitchell and Glen Streets (2021).

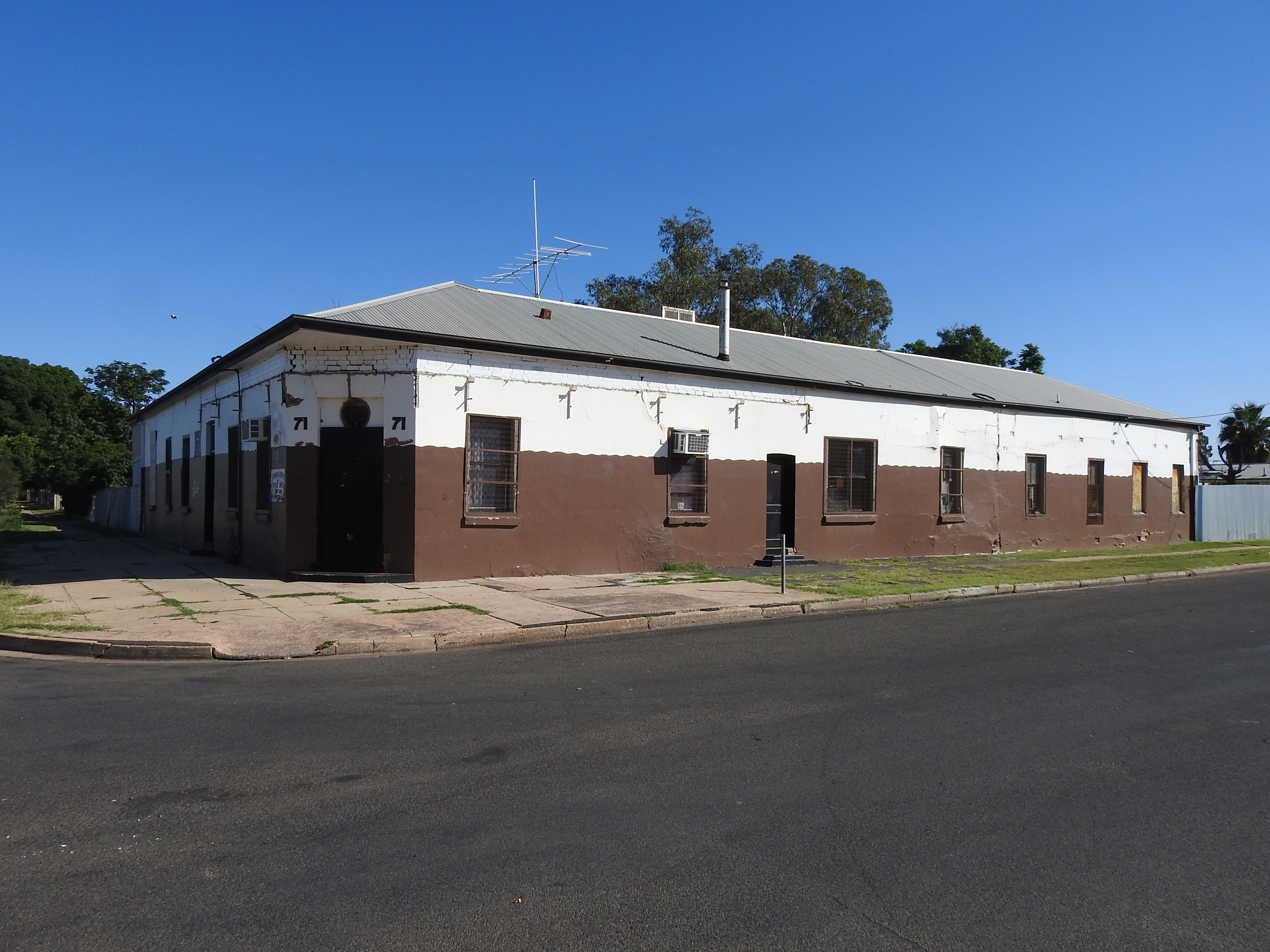
Carriers Arms Hotel, then the Cobb and Co. Tavern, Mitchell and Wilson Streets (2021).

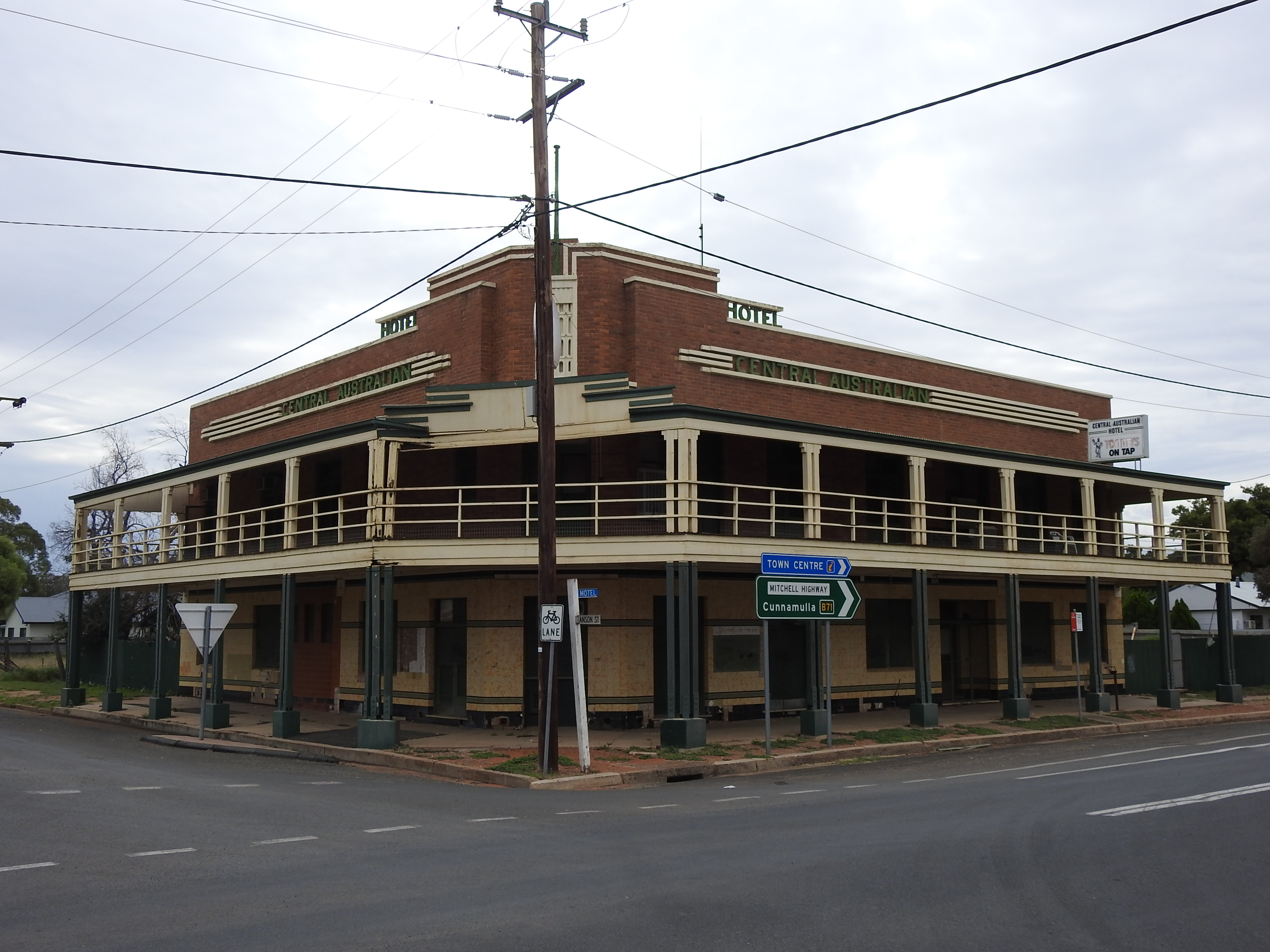
Central Australian Hotel, Anson Street (2021).

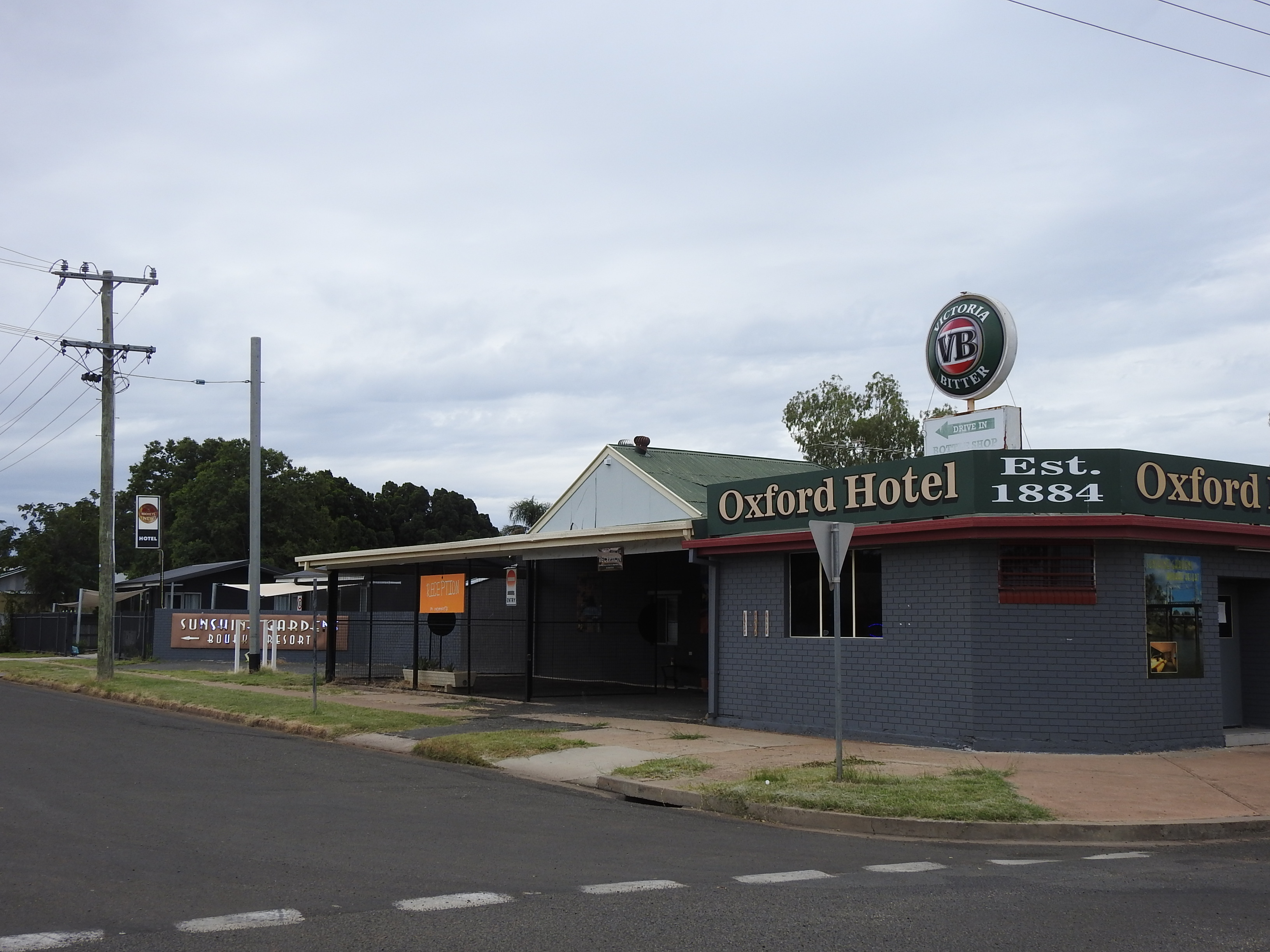
Oxford Hotel, Anson Street (2021).

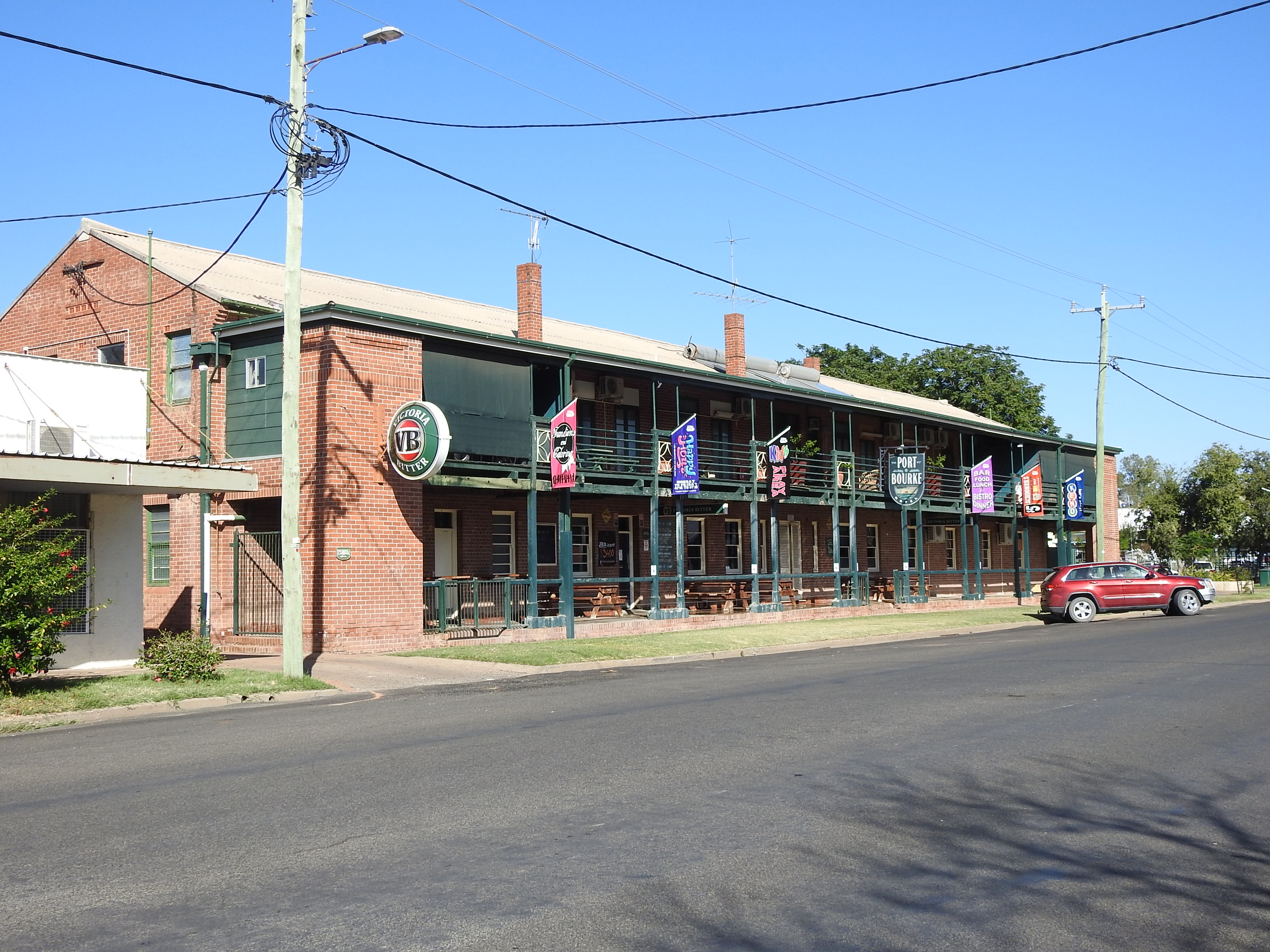
Port Bourke Hotel, Mitchell Street (2021).

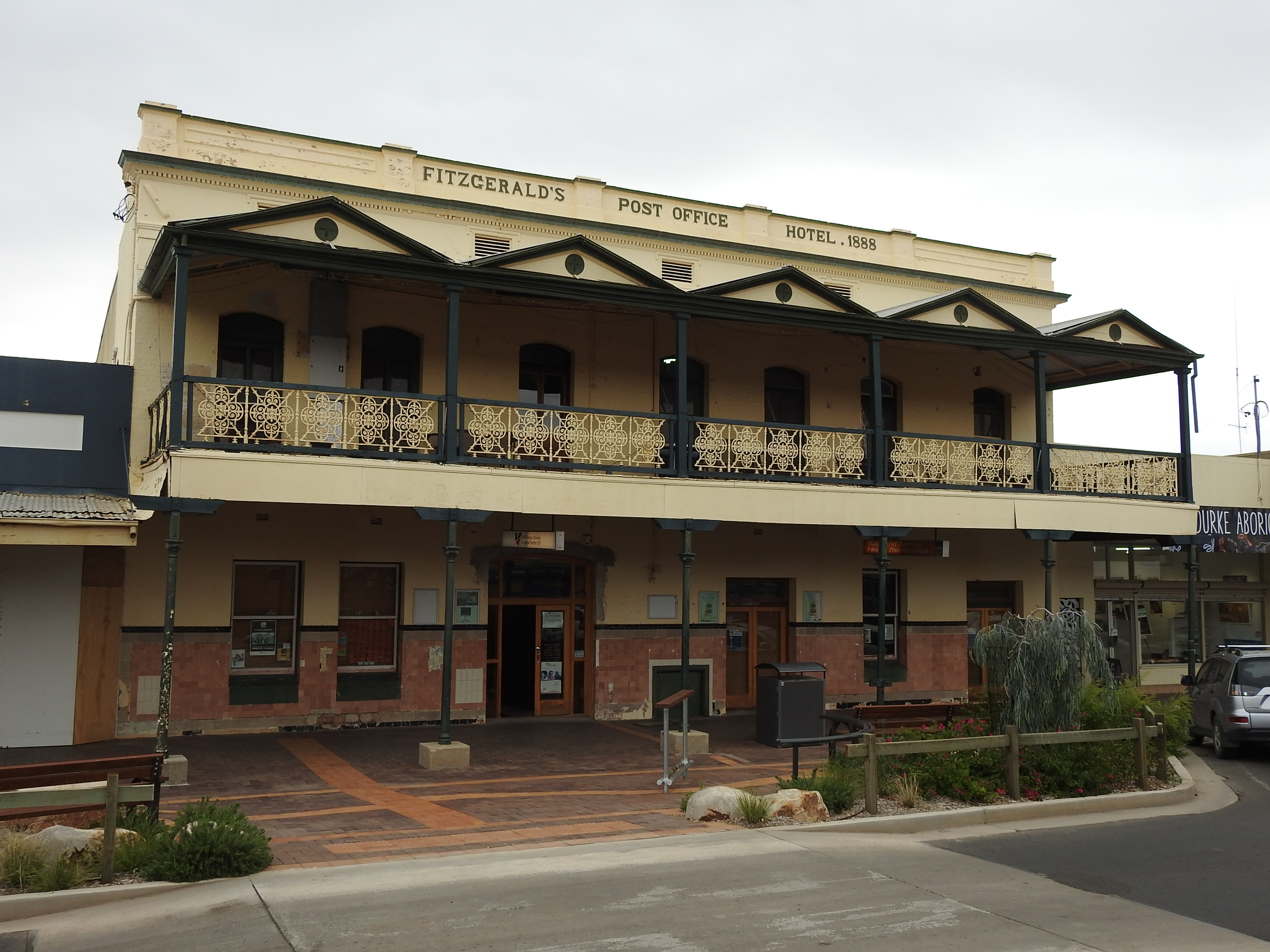
Post Office Hotel (2021).

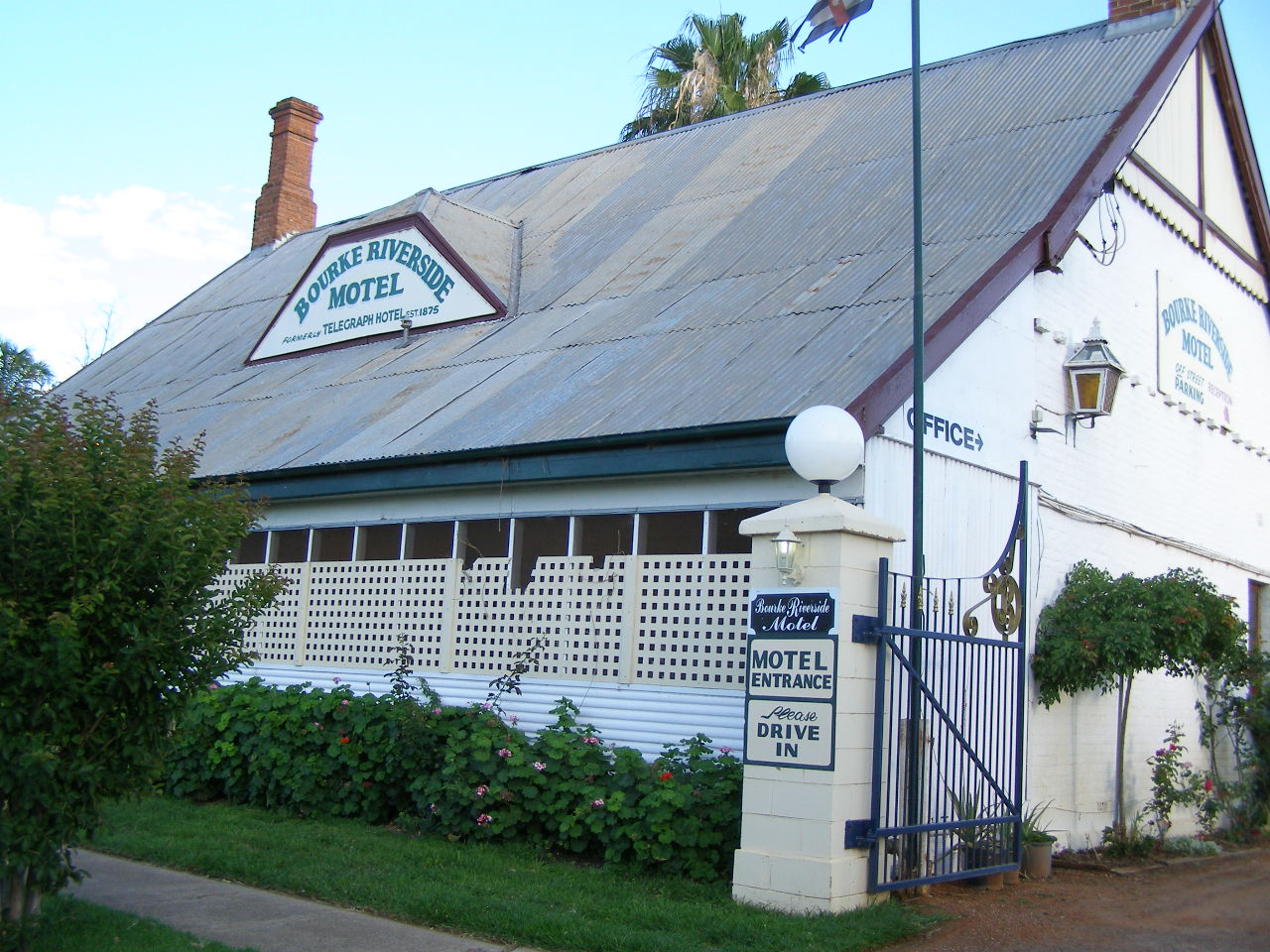
Telegraph Hotel established 1875, now Riverside Motel

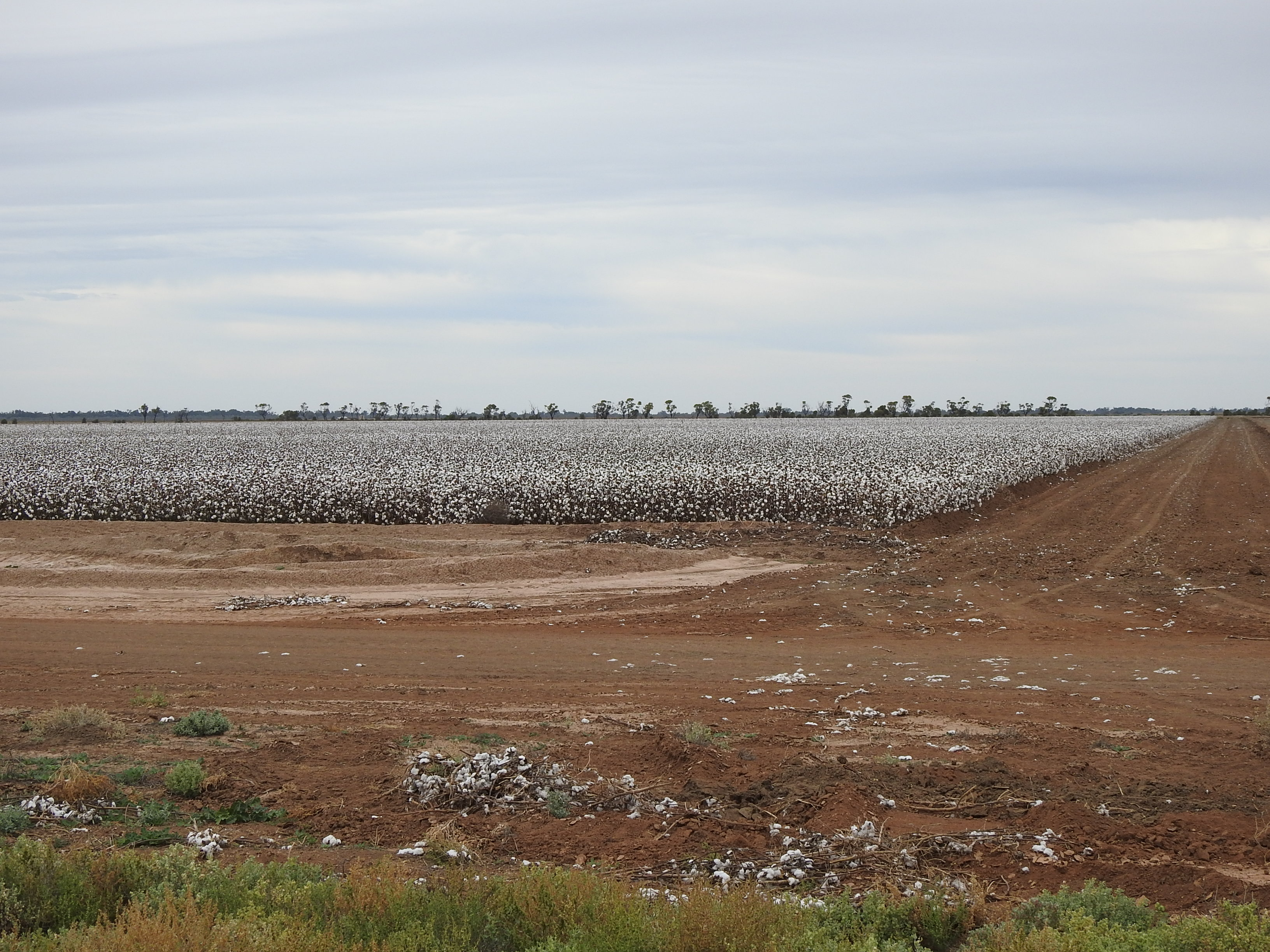
Cotton fields between Toorale National Park and North Bourke (2021).

== See also ==
- List of disasters in Australia by death toll for the 1895–1896 heat wave that killed 47 in Bourke
