= Clyde County =

Clyde
- Cadastral division
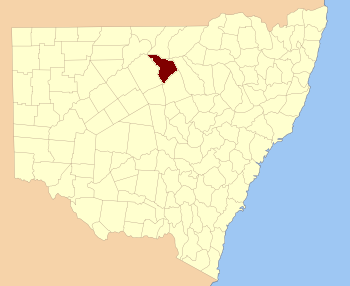
- Location in New South Wales
- Country: Australia
- State: New South Wales
Lands administrative divisions around Clyde
Gunderbooka	Narran	Finch
Cowper	Clyde	Leichhardt
Cowper	Canbelego	Gregory

Clyde County is one of the 141 cadastral divisions of the Australian state of New South Wales. It is located between the Bogan River and Barwon River in the area between them where they join. This is the area to the south of Brewarrina, as far east as the Carinda area. A very small part of the Macquarie River and Castlereagh River is also part of the boundary in the north-east.

Clyde County was named in honour of Field Marshal Sir Colin Campbell, Baron Clyde (1792–1863).

== Parishes within this county ==
A full list of parishes found within this county, their current local government area, and mapping coordinates to the approximate centre of each location is as follows:

Parish	LGA	Coordinates
Annan	Brewarrina Shire	30°30′26″S 147°02′46″E
Back Willoi	Walgett Shire	30°13′54″S 147°24′04″E
Ballaree	Warren Shire	30°29′54″S 147°18′04″E
Beemery	Bourke Shire	29°56′31″S 146°26′28″E
Bendermere	Brewarrina Shire	30°08′41″S 146°54′38″E
Billybingbone	Brewarrina Shire	30°25′38″S 147°02′37″E
Blowan	Walgett Shire	30°17′54″S 147°30′04″E
Bouka Bouka	Warren Shire	30°25′54″S 147°12′04″E
Brewarrina	Brewarrina Shire	29°58′26″S 146°50′10″E
Briarie	Brewarrina Shire	30°07′33″S 147°08′49″E
Buckinguy	Walgett Shire	30°11′54″S 147°28′04″E
Carinda	Walgett Shire	30°27′54″S 147°46′04″E
Cashmere	Warren Shire	30°25′54″S 147°18′04″E
Charlton	Brewarrina Shire	30°12′00″S 146°47′43″E
Clements	Warren Shire	30°47′54″S 147°18′04″E
Coolaree	Brewarrina Shire	30°04′16″S 146°39′56″E
Coorabur	Walgett Shire	30°19′54″S 147°42′04″E
Cowabee	Brewarrina Shire	30°08′02″S 146°59′47″E
Cowal	Warren Shire	30°50′40″S 147°11′23″E
Cowga	Brewarrina Shire	30°29′05″S 146°57′07″E
Cox	Warren Shire	30°33′46″S 147°26′37″E
Cuddie	Walgett Shire	30°19′49″S 147°21′46″E
Derri Derri	Warren Shire	30°39′31″S 147°22′19″E
Dooral	Brewarrina Shire	30°03′41″S 147°01′43″E
Druid	Brewarrina Shire	29°58′58″S 146°39′12″E
Esperance	Warren Shire	30°35′22″S 147°27′46″E
Ethelberg	Brewarrina Shire	30°13′25″S 147°08′35″E
Galar	Brewarrina Shire	30°12′51″S 147°01′31″E
Gangarry	Warren Shire	30°27′54″S 147°28′04″E
Geera	Walgett Shire	30°09′54″S 147°24′04″E
Gidgerah	Warren Shire	30°31′52″S 147°32′55″E
Ginge	Walgett Shire	30°21′54″S 147°14′04″E
Ginghet	Warren Shire	30°25′54″S 147°24′04″E
Gobollion	Warren Shire	30°39′23″S 147°16′11″E
Gongolgon	Brewarrina Shire	30°23′48″S 146°55′23″E
Gralwin	Warren Shire	30°44′10″S 147°22′55″E
Grandool	Walgett Shire	30°13′26″S 147°34′36″E
Grandoonbone	Brewarrina Shire	30°36′06″S 146°58′32″E
Gunderwerrie	Brewarrina Shire	29°58′21″S 146°44′24″E
Haradon	Brewarrina Shire	30°06′41″S 146°35′57″E
Higgins	Walgett Shire	30°37′54″S 147°14′04″E
Langmore	Brewarrina Shire	30°16′18″S 146°56′54″E
Lindsay	Brewarrina Shire	30°14′22″S 147°00′09″E
Lynch	Brewarrina Shire	30°10′17″S 146°40′41″E
Meranda	Warren Shire	30°41′54″S 147°28′04″E
Merunda	Warren Shire	30°43′01″S 147°26′54″E
Molle	Coonamble Shire	30°35′02″S 147°37′04″E
Morla	Brewarrina Shire	30°13′46″S 146°44′05″E
Mundadoo	Brewarrina Shire	30°47′51″S 147°12′18″E
Mundawah	Warren Shire	30°33′54″S 147°08′04″E
Navina	Brewarrina Shire	30°04′57″S 146°53′00″E
Quabothoo	Coonamble Shire	30°33′54″S 147°44′04″E
Ridge	Warren Shire	30°51′54″S 147°16′04″E
Stonehenge	Brewarrina Shire	30°02′44″S 146°28′14″E
Thuara	Warren Shire	30°27′54″S 147°14′04″E
Thudie	Brewarrina Shire	30°21′21″S 147°03′55″E
Tichawanta	Brewarrina Shire	30°05′37″S 146°46′27″E
Tulloch	Brewarrina Shire	30°15′22″S 146°48′47″E
Uki	Bogan Shire	30°50′35″S 147°06′14″E
Ulourie	Walgett Shire	30°19′31″S 147°14′52″E
Wammerawa	Walgett Shire	30°21′24″S 147°35′24″E
Waveney	Brewarrina Shire	30°32′57″S 147°02′31″E
Weeli	Brewarrina Shire	30°39′23″S 147°10′00″E
Welman	Brewarrina Shire	30°00′40″S 146°55′30″E
Weribiddee	Walgett Shire	30°25′07″S 147°43′06″E
Wilga	Brewarrina Shire	30°24′47″S 147°07′53″E
Willa Murra	Brewarrina Shire	unknown
Willary	Brewarrina Shire	30°29′05″S 147°08′27″E
Willenbone	Walgett Shire	30°24′18″S 147°35′50″E
Willewa	Walgett Shire	30°27′54″S 147°38′04″E
Willi Culling	Warren Shire	30°42′17″S 147°16′23″E
Willoi	Walgett Shire	30°11′54″S 147°18′04″E
Womboin	Warren Shire	30°35′01″S 147°20′59″E
Wommera	Brewarrina Shire	30°02′00″S 146°48′03″E
Wommo	Walgett Shire	30°21′59″S 147°18′56″E
Wyabray	Walgett Shire	30°09′54″S 147°18′04″E
Yambacuna	Brewarrina Shire	29°58′34″S 146°34′15″E
Yanda	Walgett Shire	30°24′39″S 147°27′22″E
Yarea	Warren Shire	30°39′54″S 147°32′04″E
Yarrawin	Brewarrina Shire	30°17′34″S 147°10′14″E
