= Narran County =

Narran New South Wales
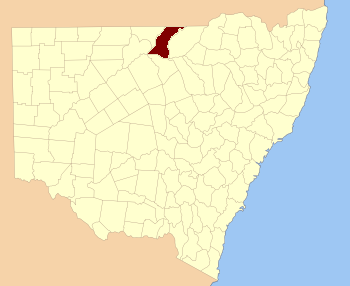
- Location in New South Wales
Lands administrative divisions around Narran:
| Queensland | Queensland | Queensland |
| Culgoa | Narran | Finch |
| Gunderbooka | Clyde | Leichhardt |

Narran County is one of the 141 cadastral divisions of New South Wales. It is bounded by the Culgoa River on the west, the Narran River in the east, the Queensland border in the north, and the Barwon River in the south. It includes Goodooga and the area to the north of Brewarrina.

A third river runs thought Narran County – the Bokhara River with Goodooga being on its eastern bank. The three rivers – the Narran, the Bokhara, and the Culgoa – are branches of the Balonne River and all three enter the Barwon River separately. The confluence of the Culgoa and the Barwon rivers is the start of the Darling River.

Narran is believed to be derived from a local Aboriginal word.

== Parishes within this county ==
A full list of parishes found within this county; their current LGA and mapping coordinates to the approximate centre of each location is as follows:

| Parish | LGA | Coordinates |
|---|---|---|
| Akolia | Brewarrina Shire | 29°31′39″S 147°23′15″E |
| Ballanbillian | Brewarrina Shire | 29°05′44″S 147°51′39″E |
| Bannockburn | Brewarrina Shire | 29°35′22″S 146°53′29″E |
| Belbrook | Brewarrina Shire | 29°52′39″S 147°06′02″E |
| Bilbil | Brewarrina Shire | 29°31′18″S 147°17′39″E |
| Bindayah | Brewarrina Shire | 29°24′49″S 147°17′34″E |
| Birruma | Walgett Shire | 29°05′49″S 147°58′39″E |
| Blake | Brewarrina Shire | 29°41′26″S 147°08′04″E |
| Blantyre | Brewarrina Shire | 29°50′36″S 146°56′48″E |
| Bogeira | Brewarrina Shire | 29°04′14″S 147°44′52″E |
| Bogwarra | Brewarrina Shire | 29°11′16″S 147°40′11″E |
| Bombah | Brewarrina Shire | 29°15′16″S 147°02′25″E |
| Boogenderra | Brewarrina Shire | 29°02′36″S 147°17′47″E |
| Booman Gabar | Brewarrina Shire | 29°49′38″S 147°22′37″E |
| Boonderra | Brewarrina Shire | 29°49′40″S 146°32′06″E |
| Bragla | Brewarrina Shire | 29°39′35″S 146°50′11″E |
| Braltchee | Brewarrina Shire | 29°44′57″S 147°11′57″E |
| Briery | Brewarrina Shire | 30°02′03″S 147°13′35″E |
| Bruce | Brewarrina Shire | 29°32′22″S 146°49′54″E |
| Bugindear | Brewarrina Shire | 29°12′36″S 147°28′11″E |
| Buleek | Brewarrina Shire | 29°35′54″S 147°14′53″E |
| Bundabulla | Brewarrina Shire | 29°34′25″S 147°02′51″E |
| Bunna Bunna | Brewarrina Shire | 29°00′47″S 147°30′14″E |
| Bunnawanna | Bourke Shire | 29°53′58″S 146°28′30″E |
| Bunyip | Brewarrina Shire | 29°43′24″S 146°53′18″E |
| Burrell | Brewarrina Shire | 29°24′41″S 147°26′42″E |
| Byerawering | Brewarrina Shire | 29°15′25″S 147°09′51″E |
| Carcool | Brewarrina Shire | 29°40′52″S 147°12′11″E |
| Cato | Brewarrina Shire | 29°58′58″S 146°59′17″E |
| Cobran | Brewarrina Shire | 29°09′41″S 147°06′37″E |
| Collywarry | Brewarrina Shire | 29°59′00″S 147°05′54″E |
| Concord | Brewarrina Shire | 29°18′57″S 147°30′41″E |
| Coobah | Brewarrina Shire | 29°35′57″S 147°21′13″E |
| Coobeinda | Brewarrina Shire | 29°02′57″S 147°24′31″E |
| Coobung | Brewarrina Shire | 29°23′42″S 147°23′07″E |
| Coonghan | Walgett Shire | 29°01′09″S 148°00′24″E |
| Cowga | Brewarrina Shire | 29°07′14″S 147°27′56″E |
| Cranbrook | Brewarrina Shire | 29°51′42″S 146°41′12″E |
| Cumblegubinbah | Brewarrina Shire | 29°13′32″S 147°45′26″E |
| Denman | Brewarrina Shire | 29°07′13″S 147°21′06″E |
| Dickenson | Brewarrina Shire | 29°37′09″S 147°06′53″E |
| Drumdelang | Brewarrina Shire | 29°47′05″S 146°50′23″E |
| Gannawarra | Brewarrina Shire | 29°37′32″S 146°41′21″E |
| Gayer | Brewarrina Shire | 29°19′12″S 147°15′05″E |
| Gidgier | Brewarrina Shire | 29°18′42″S 146°59′20″E |
| Gillgi | Brewarrina Shire | 29°54′05″S 147°15′45″E |
| Gnomery | Brewarrina Shire | 29°10′04″S 147°16′45″E |
| Goonoo | Brewarrina Shire | 29°55′30″S 146°48′27″E |
| Gruie | Brewarrina Shire | 29°28′18″S 147°12′50″E |
| Hammond | Brewarrina Shire | 29°02′25″S 147°38′30″E |
| Jumbuck | Brewarrina Shire | 29°42′01″S 146°40′13″E |
| Kalistha | Brewarrina Shire | 29°24′18″S 147°02′38″E |
| Kelvedon | Brewarrina Shire | 29°48′51″S 146°44′09″E |
| Kiengal | Brewarrina Shire | 29°21′18″S 147°10′22″E |
| Konowogan | Brewarrina Shire | 29°26′36″S 146°49′21″E |
| Langboyde | Brewarrina Shire | 29°30′54″S 147°01′10″E |
| Lignum | Brewarrina Shire | 29°38′31″S 146°56′22″E |
| Lillicro | Brewarrina Shire | 29°08′48″S 147°33′54″E |
| Linchiden | Brewarrina Shire | 29°29′33″S 146°53′59″E |
| Lolah | Brewarrina Shire | 29°44′03″S 147°20′49″E |
| Lulawar | Brewarrina Shire | 29°17′23″S 147°21′19″E |
| Mildool | Brewarrina Shire | 29°01′16″S 147°51′22″E |
| Milroy | Brewarrina Shire | 29°44′19″S 146°45′04″E |
| Minna | Brewarrina Shire | 29°03′48″S 147°11′37″E |
| Mogila | Brewarrina Shire | 29°04′21″S 147°33′08″E |
| Mohenia | Brewarrina Shire | 29°55′16″S 146°36′35″E |
| Moongoonoola | Brewarrina Shire | 29°09′11″S 147°48′12″E |
| Morabilla | Brewarrina Shire | 29°41′43″S 147°00′56″E |
| Morella | Brewarrina Shire | 29°46′20″S 147°06′10″E |
| Muckerawea | Brewarrina Shire | 29°20′04″S 147°36′24″E |
| Mungiladh | Brewarrina Shire | 29°16′31″S 147°40′14″E |
| Mungrada | Brewarrina Shire | 29°20′52″S 147°26′02″E |
| Nardoo | Brewarrina Shire | 29°22′40″S 146°58′09″E |
| Narrandool | Brewarrina Shire | 29°52′45″S 146°51′08″E |
| Ninmegate | Brewarrina Shire | 29°39′02″S 147°19′02″E |
| Papperton | Brewarrina Shire | 29°20′58″S 146°54′08″E |
| Quantambone | Brewarrina Shire | 29°55′07″S 146°59′18″E |
| Sawers | Brewarrina Shire | 29°31′00″S 147°08′48″E |
| Talawanta | Brewarrina Shire | 29°32′54″S 146°57′32″E |
| Terewah | Brewarrina Shire | 29°54′15″S 147°25′27″E |
| Teriabola | Brewarrina Shire | 29°09′53″S 147°22′56″E |
| Terra Walka | Brewarrina Shire | 29°48′37″S 147°13′13″E |
| Thulama | Brewarrina Shire | 29°57′29″S 147°24′39″E |
| Towtowra | Brewarrina Shire | 29°12′12″S 147°12′58″E |
| Waroma | Brewarrina Shire | 29°23′58″S 146°48′20″E |
| Warrambool | Brewarrina Shire | 29°13′55″S 147°22′02″E |
| Wilby | Brewarrina Shire | 29°26′07″S 147°29′08″E |
| Wilga | Brewarrina Shire | 29°35′35″S 146°47′04″E |
| Willawillinbah | Brewarrina Shire | 29°27′48″S 147°21′23″E |
| Wilson | Brewarrina Shire | 29°34′53″S 147°12′24″E |
| Wirrawarra | Brewarrina Shire | 29°21′35″S 147°20′06″E |
| Wongal | Brewarrina Shire | 29°39′53″S 146°44′16″E |
| Woolnorth | Brewarrina Shire | 29°47′56″S 147°00′17″E |
| Wureep | Brewarrina Shire | 29°44′47″S 146°38′31″E |
| Yamboor | Brewarrina Shire | 29°15′36″S 147°16′50″E |
| Yarkieta | Brewarrina Shire | 29°29′58″S 146°41′54″E |
| Zara | Brewarrina Shire | 29°47′12″S 146°34′22″E |
