= Gunderbooka County =

Gunderbooka
- Cadastral division
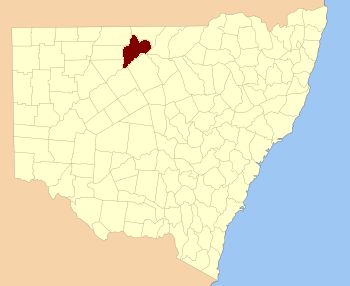
- Location in New South Wales
- Country: Australia
- State: New South Wales
Lands administrative divisions around Gunderbooka
| Irrara | Culgoa | Culgoa |
| Barrona | Gunderbooka | Narran |
| Landsborough | Yanda | Cowper |

Gunderbooka County is one of the 141 cadastral divisions of New South Wales.

== Geography ==
The Warrego River is the western boundary, and the Culgoa River and Darling River is the south-eastern boundary. It includes the area down to where the Warrego meets the Darling, to the north of Bourke (including North Bourke).

The village of Ford's Bridge, the town of Enngonia and Burke all lie just outside the county with North Bourke being the only settlement currently in the county. The entirety of the county is incorporated, with the seat of government being located in Bourke.

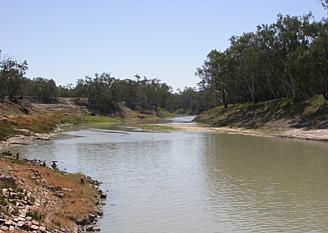
The Darling River is the boundary between Gunderbooka and Cowper.

== Etymology ==
Gunderbooka is believed to be derived from a local Aboriginal word and is also the name of Gundabook Station.

== History ==
The area occupied by the country was the traditional lands of three groups of Aboriginal tribes.

Living In the west of the County along the Warrego river, were the Gunu people, living in the south along the flood plain of the Darling River were the Barranbidgee people with the Wangoibon tribes living on the adjacent river bank of the Darling River, in what is today Cowper Country.

In the north of the County lived the Manuwari people.

The first Europeans to the County were the expedition of Charles Sturt in 1828. Followed by the expedition of Thomas Mitchell in 1835.

Poet Henry Lawson came to the Country walking from Bourke to Hungerford in 1892.

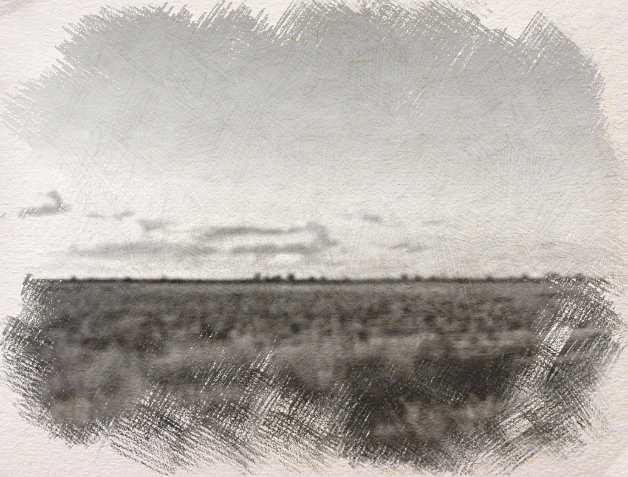
Landscape of Coooer Parish in Gunderbooka Country

And another poet, Oglevy coined the phrase "Back of Burke" to describe the remoteness of the northern part of the country during his time working in Engonnia in the years around Federation.

== Parishes within this county ==
A full list of parishes found within this county; their current LGA and mapping coordinates to the approximate centre of each location is as follows:

| Parish | LGA | Coordinates |
|---|---|---|
| Aripilis | Bourke Shire | 30°17′04″S 145°30′52″E |
| Bibildoolie | Bourke Shire | 29°38′50″S 145°46′40″E |
| Booka | Bourke Shire | 30°04′00″S 145°27′42″E |
| Bothadoola | Bourke Shire | 30°02′43″S 145°34′43″E |
| Boyong | Bourke Shire | 30°09′40″S 145°44′44″E |
| Brandis | Bourke Shire | 29°53′49″S 145°57′50″E |
| Bullamunta | Bourke Shire | 30°00′33″S 145°58′14″E |
| Coolamon | Bourke Shire | 29°45′12″S 145°41′28″E |
| Cooning | Bourke Shire | 29°33′28″S 146°09′30″E |
| Cooper | Bourke Shire | 29°49′55″S 145°44′16″E |
| Courallie | Bourke Shire | 29°36′50″S 145°54′42″E |
| Cumbooka | Bourke Shire | 29°42′53″S 146°17′55″E |
| Cuttabulla | Bourke Shire | 29°28′28″S 145°57′10″E |
| Darling | Bourke Shire | 29°42′22″S 146°04′40″E |
| Fords Bridge | Bourke Shire | 29°50′53″S 145°29′45″E |
| Franklin | Bourke Shire | 30°06′25″S 145°40′43″E |
| Galar | Bourke Shire | 29°43′23″S 145°44′43″E |
| Goldson | Bourke Shire | 29°49′12″S 146°02′52″E |
| Greig | Bourke Shire | 29°51′28″S 145°57′58″E |
| Ledknapper | Bourke Shire | 29°35′32″S 146°13′26″E |
| Leila | Bourke Shire | 29°29′33″S 145°48′26″E |
| Looden | Bourke Shire | 29°50′10″S 146°14′11″E |
| Mooramia | Bourke Shire | 29°49′41″S 145°52′20″E |
| Mumpber | Bourke Shire | 30°11′14″S 145°30′50″E |
| Mungunyah | Bourke Shire | 29°24′54″S 145°51′06″E |
| Nellys Springs | Bourke Shire | 29°35′35″S 146°03′20″E |
| Nidgerie | Bourke Shire | 29°58′56″S 145°40′42″E |
| North Bourke | Bourke Shire | 30°02′45″S 145°56′33″E |
| Nulty | Bourke Shire | 30°12′35″S 145°38′01″E |
| Paka | Bourke Shire | 30°02′49″S 145°43′30″E |
| Palmer | Bourke Shire | 29°45′17″S 146°09′54″E |
| Pera | Bourke Shire | 30°03′54″S 145°52′24″E |
| Polo | Bourke Shire | 29°58′45″S 145°47′09″E |
| Quondong | Bourke Shire | 29°46′02″S 146°25′59″E |
| Sutherland | Bourke Shire | 29°53′48″S 145°37′33″E |
| Talaa | Bourke Shire | 30°00′33″S 145°52′02″E |
| Tobin | Bourke Shire | unknown |
| Toorale | Bourke Shire | 30°16′40″S 145°25′30″E |
| Tresillian | Bourke Shire | 29°46′22″S 145°53′50″E |
| Tully | Bourke Shire | 29°52′04″S 146°08′32″E |
| Turee | Bourke Shire | 29°54′43″S 146°06′02″E |
| Warraweena | Bourke Shire | 29°55′33″S 146°15′56″E |
| Wommera | Bourke Shire | 29°57′01″S 145°35′47″E |
| Yarraman | Bourke Shire | 29°40′53″S 146°21′15″E |
| Yurongan | Bourke Shire | 29°37′19″S 146°13′29″E |
