= Culgoa County =

Administrative area in New South Wales, Australia

Culgoa New South Wales
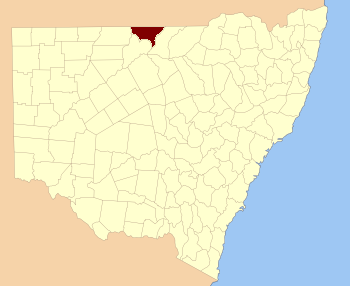
- Location in New South Wales
Lands administrative divisions around Culgoa:
Queensland	Queensland	Queensland
Irrara	Culgoa	Narran
Gunderbooka	Gunderbooka	Narran

Culgoa County is one of the 141 cadastral divisions of New South Wales. It is bounded by the Warrego River in the west, and the Culgoa River in the east.

The name Culgoa is of unknown origin.

== Parishes within this county ==
A full list of parishes found within this county; their current LGA and mapping coordinates to the approximate centre of each location is as follows:

Parish	LGA	Coordinates
Anderson	Bourke Shire	29°00′38″S 145°54′22″E
Barringun	Bourke Shire	29°01′18″S 145°46′07″E
Belalie	Bourke Shire	29°06′31″S 145°49′52″E
Beri	Brewarrina Shire	29°01′00″S 147°09′38″E
Boneda	Bourke Shire	29°10′53″S 146°16′03″E
Booroominia	Brewarrina Shire	29°25′21″S 146°35′27″E
Bourbah	Brewarrina Shire	29°03′43″S 147°02′30″E
Brenda	Brewarrina Shire	29°01′02″S 147°18′14″E
Brolga	Bourke Shire	29°19′00″S 146°16′51″E
Bundaleear	Brewarrina Shire	29°04′05″S 146°24′26″E
Buntawarrara	Bourke Shire	29°25′09″S 146°08′23″E
Cedia	Bourke Shire	29°26′13″S 146°14′25″E
Cockellireena	Bourke Shire	29°39′07″S 146°34′18″E
Coolibar	Bourke Shire	29°25′04″S 146°27′25″E
Corella	Bourke Shire	29°28′19″S 146°20′37″E
Coward	Bourke Shire	29°30′28″S 146°13′35″E
Currindule	Bourke Shire	29°24′56″S 146°02′16″E
Darling	Brewarrina Shire	unknown
Diemunga	Brewarrina Shire	29°05′43″S 146°55′24″E
Dingo	Bourke Shire	29°01′18″S 146°07′57″E
Emu Hill	Bourke Shire	29°12′03″S 146°06′07″E
Enngonia	Bourke Shire	29°18′22″S 145°52′49″E
Grindie	Bourke Shire	29°33′44″S 146°20′23″E
Gurrera	Bourke Shire	29°16′13″S 146°19′45″E
Hardie	Bourke Shire	29°08′45″S 146°16′02″E
Jamieson	Brewarrina Shire	29°12′01″S 146°28′03″E
Keats	Brewarrina Shire	29°09′10″S 146°48′22″E
Lissington	Bourke Shire	29°26′27″S 146°20′21″E
Loxton	Bourke Shire	29°11′22″S 145°55′36″E
Malgoolie	Bourke Shire	29°34′32″S 146°27′44″E
Milroy West	Brewarrina Shire	29°30′57″S 146°33′11″E
Morton Plains	Brewarrina Shire	29°01′19″S 146°33′14″E
Mudelooromun	Brewarrina Shire	29°04′04″S 146°40′59″E
Opal	Bourke Shire	29°04′05″S 146°17′22″E
Payera	Brewarrina Shire	29°22′43″S 146°37′11″E
Power	Bourke Shire	29°16′25″S 146°02′47″E
Tatala	Brewarrina Shire	29°07′53″S 146°59′02″E
Tawaggan	Brewarrina Shire	29°01′47″S 146°48′44″E
Thurlagoona	Bourke Shire	29°03′35″S 145°56′17″E
Thurmylae	Bourke Shire	29°16′52″S 145°54′49″E
Wee Warra	Bourke Shire	29°22′30″S 145°57′54″E
Weejallah	Bourke Shire	29°16′20″S 146°09′48″E
Weilmoringle	Brewarrina Shire	29°13′14″S 146°54′00″E
Yamby	Brewarrina Shire	29°16′44″S 146°46′57″E
Yamby West	Brewarrina Shire	29°14′18″S 146°38′21″E
Yarran	Brewarrina Shire	29°17′46″S 146°29′10″E
