= London Chartered Bank of Australia Building, Bourke =

Heritage-listed building in Bourke, New South Wales, Australia

Old London Bank Building
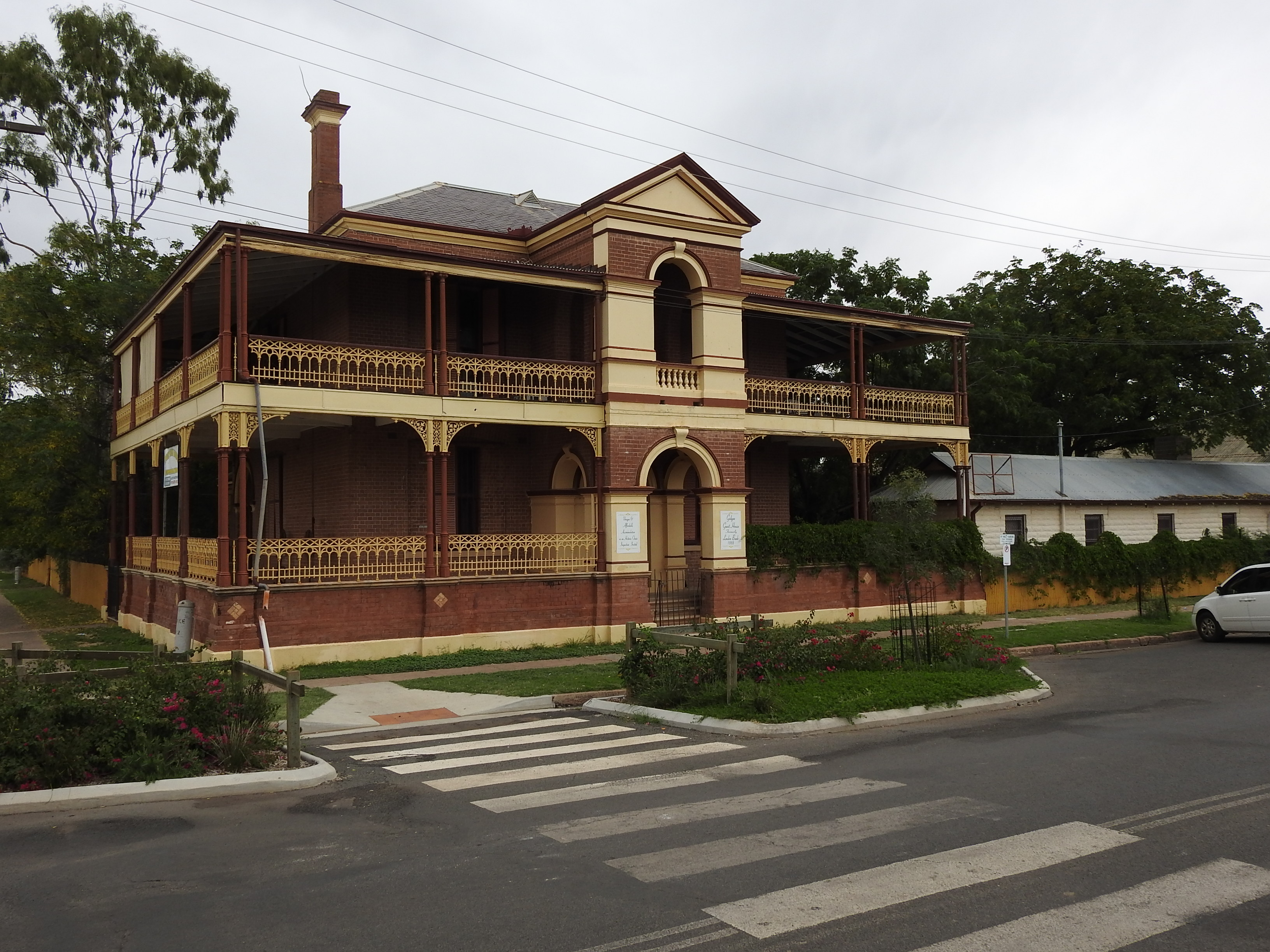
- London Bank building (2021)

- Location within New South Wales Location within Australia
- 30.0894°S 145.9349°E
- Location: 17 Sturt Street, Bourke, Bourke Shire, New South Wales, Australia

History
- Built: 1886–1888

Site notes
- Architect(s): Terry and Oakden; architects based in Melbourne
- Architectural style: Victorian Filigree

New South Wales Heritage Register
- Official name: Old London Bank Building; Gidgee Guesthouse
- Type: state heritage (built)
- Designated: 2 April 1999
- Reference no.: 764
- Type: historic site
- Builders: attributed to local builders / architects Perry and Hawken

The Old London Bank Building is a heritage-listed former bank building and boarding house and now guesthouse at 17 Sturt Street, Bourke, Bourke Shire, New South Wales, Australia. It was designed by Melbourne architectural firm Terry and Oakden and built from 1886 to 1888, with construction attributed to local builders/architects Perry and Hawken. The building now operates as the Gidgee Guesthouse. It was added to the New South Wales State Heritage Register on 2 April 1999.

== History ==
In 1862, prior to the first sale of land at Bourke, William Sly, Joseph Becker and John Kelly are thought to have constructed the first buildings in Bourke on the banks of the Darling River on what was to become Lots 245 and 6 of Section 1 and Lots 1, 2, 3 and 5 of Section 2 located next to the punt. Sly and Kelly established the first Bourke hotels on their land and Becker established a store. Sly also owned Lot 6, which is the site of the Old London Bank.

Bourke was proclaimed a township in 1862 and quickly grew and developed. By 1872 the township's businesses included bakers, cordial manufacturers, tailors, jewellers, market gardeners, and a blacksmith and wheelwright. The growth and development of Bourke continued throughout the 1890s and the early decades of the twentieth century. The telegraph system of communication was supplemented with telephone in 1911 and electricity became available in the early 1930s. With development grew numerous industries. There were two Bourke breweries operating by 1881 as woolstores, and the meat processing and export industry was established in 1889. The local meat business, Bourke Meat Works closed in 1900 and it was not until 1938 that it was replaced by Tancred Brothers Pty Ltd who established an abattoir in Bourke in 1938. This business prospered and continued to operate through the 1970s.

The industry and business interests in the Bourke community were supported by a growing financial and banking sector. The first bank to open in Bourke was the Commercial Banking Company of Sydney in 1865, this was followed by the Australian Joint Stock Bank in 1875, the Bank of New South Wales in 1877 and by 1881 the London Chartered Bank of Australia was established in the town, the bank was restructured in 1888 becoming the London Bank of Australia. Most of these banking operations had started their operations in rented rooms in the business district. As they firmed their position in the community most banks purchased property and constructed imposing premises from which to operate.

In April 1887 the London Chartered Bank purchased Lot 6 Section 1, which had by this time passed from the ownership of William Sly to Henry and George Colless and eventually to George Allen, Charles Cowper and Jane Becker. By 1887 a prominent firm of architects from Melbourne, Terry and Oakden had been commissioned to design the new London Chartered Bank building and residence. The building was completed by 1889 and the bank operations and the then Bank Manager's family, the Gledhills, moved into the premises on 12 February 1889.

The building housed the operations of the London Bank of Australia from 1889 to 1942. In 1920 the bank was amalgamated with the English, Scottish and Australian Bank (ES&A) bank. During these years the bank and its managers became part of the fabric of the political social and business life of the Bourke community. The bank managers' families were involved in community affairs such as local sporting event, council business and charitable activities. One bank manager, Mr Gledhill, became Mayor of Bourke and inevitably the Bank as part of its business operations came to hold substantial interests in local pastoral land through the process of administering mortgages on properties.

In 1942 the Bank closed its operation in Bourke due to the wartime rationalisation scheme which aimed to free up personnel so they could enlist or contribute to the war effort. The building was purchased in 1942 by the a Sylvia Faith Randall, who immediately transferred ownership to Tancred Brothers who by this time had built a boarding house or hostel on the adjacent property to house their abattoir staff.

The hostel was run by a series of managers who were either women or couples. It operated as a hostel until the 1970s. Initially rent was paid directly to the Tancred Brothers who then paid the managers. Later a system was established where the manager collected rent and paid a portion of it to Tancred Brothers. While initially confined to the hostel or barracks building, with an increasing demand for accommodation not only from Tancred employees but also itinerant shearers and others, the boarding house operations gradually encroached onto the bank premises. In 1943 a dining room building was built directly adjacent to the living room and kitchen of the original residence. The manager and her family lived in the original residence and eventually some of Tancreds' more senior employees also lived in rooms in the original residence.

In 1946 the Commonwealth Bank leased the former banking chambers at the Old London Bank. The design of the building ensured that secure banking operations could be maintained even if other parts of the original residence continued to serve as a boarding house and accommodation for the boarding house managers family. The chambers had by this time been partitioned into accommodation quarters and Tancreds agreed to remove these, repair and paint the walls, windows and doors, clean the area, and install certain fittings for the bank. The verandah was enclosed for bathroom facilities in the 1950s.

The Commonwealth Bank operated from the Old London Bank's chambers until 1956 when it was again used to accommodate the seasonal surges in Tancred staff numbers. Tancred's operations in Bourke were affected by the periods of drought, industrial action and shifts in the market demand for their products during the 1960s and 1970s. During this period the bank building's use as accommodation quarters ceased and the hostel quarters adjacent closed in 1972.

In 1981 the Bank building was bought and used as a residence and secondhand furniture repair shop. In 1988, the Bourke Historic Buildings Co-op purchased the building with a grant from the New South Wales Heritage Council. Some restoration was undertaken at this time. In 1993 a Permanent Conservation Order was gazetted for the Old London Bank.

Between 1993 and 1997 the Cornerstone Community established backpacker accommodation on the premises. Some maintenance work and renovations were undertaken during the lease period, but towards the end of their tenure some structural problems were identified which required quite extensive maintenance and replacement work.

Between 1998 and 1999 vandalism exacerbated the maintenance problems.

In 2001 an agreement was struck between Chris Ware and Kristie Smiles and the Bourke Shire Council (for the Historic Building Co-Op) which allowed for the conservation and repair of the building "in consideration of future ownership". The work began in 2001 and the premises was opened as the Gidgee Guesthouse in 2002.

== Description ==
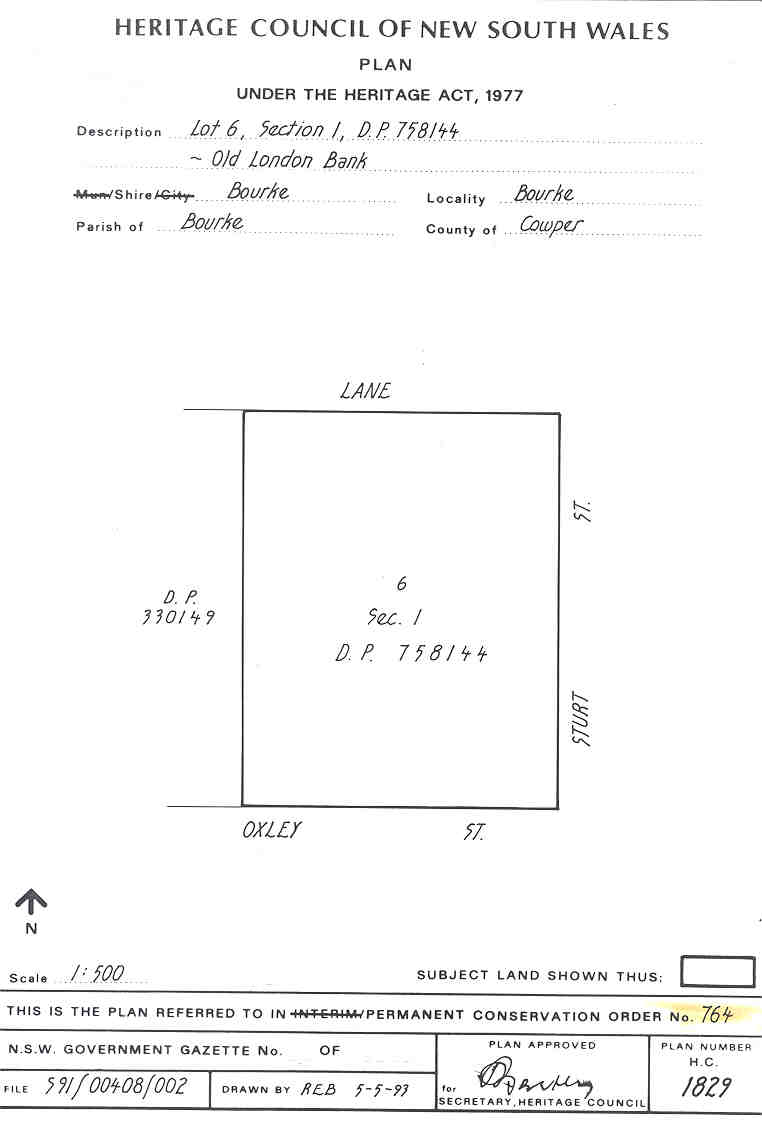
Heritage boundaries

The former London Chartered Bank is located at 17 Oxley Street, Bourke and is bound on the north by a laneway, the southern side by Oxley Street, the eastern side by Sturt Street. The site today consists of 5 buildings.

1. A two-storey brick Victorian Filigree Style commercial building facing onto Oxley Street and Sturt Streets.

This building has a single-story wing extending to the west of the property. The brick construction of the two-storey wing is tuck-pointed Flemish bond. The single-storey wing is of stretcher bond. The roof of the two-storey wing of the building is hipped with gabled roof vents and constructed of slate. The single-storey wing roof is hipped and is constructed of slate except for a section on the northern section which is of corrugated sheet metal.

The two-storey section of the building is surrounded on three sides by deep verandahs on both levels. The ground-floor verandah consists of a brick baluster with piers at intervals and a stone copping. Paired, fluted cast-iron posts are positioned above each brick pier. The columns have a faceted base, decorative capitals, infill panel and brackets. Double-sided cast-iron panels with a Gothic tracery motif form a railing between the paired columns. The upper verandah follows the same theme without the brackets. The arched portico entry to the banking chamber from Sturt Street is position centrally in the eastern facade and is approached by white marble steps.

The entry to the former bank manager's residence is located toward the western end of the southern facade of the building off Oxley Street. Its arched door opening with highlight window and side lights and timber mouldings give the entrance suitable prominence.

The interior of this building comprises the former banking chamber (now used as common area for guests) accessed through an entrance hall and also the bank managers office (now used as part of the accommodation for the guesthouse manager). These rooms retain many original features such as original joinery and a black marble fireplace, although the original plaster lathe ceilings are covered by a new ceiling. The rear wing contains the former residence kitchen and living and dining room complete with pressed metal ceilings and servery, parts of an internal bell pull system and the original Metters kitchen stove. Other rooms on this level include the bathroom and former bedroom and store. The upper level of the building is accessed by the original decorative timber staircase and the second storey rooms retain much of their original detailing, such as cornices and doors.

The former bank and residence has suffered some masonry cracking through poor drainage and the results of vandalism and neglect. Upper floor verandah collapsed and is being reinstated. Timber window shutters are similarly being repaired or reinstated. Some of the interior of the bank and residence has sustained damage through neglect and work has begun to repair this and restore original features.

2. A single-storey concrete block building located adjacent to and north of the original kitchen.

This was added in 1943 and functioned as the kitchen for the boarding house established on the site by the Tancred Brothers to house their Bourke employees. It is now a kitchen/dining room for the current backpacker accommodation (in what is described here as Building 3) It can be accessed through an opening between the residence dining/living room and this room and has a deck at its eastern end, which has replaced a narrow verandah running between this building and the verandah of the residence.

The former Tancreds dining room requires maintenance to remediate masonry cracking and external timber deterioration

3. Accommodation wing, formerly known as Tancred Brothers Boarding House.

This is an L-shaped, painted, concrete-block building with a half gabled hip corrugated iron roof located on the east and northern boundaries of the property. The building contains a series of 11 bedrooms opening onto a verandah that runs along the building and opens onto a garden.

The Accommodation wing has sustained damage to the barge boards and the half gable at the end of the roof.

4. Ablutions block

At the north western end of this building is a relatively newly constructed toilet and shower block.

5. Laundry Store Room

A single-storey brick building located at the north west corner of the residence.

== Heritage listing ==
The Old London Bank in Bourke was built on the site of the town's first land sale in 1862. The bank reflects the opulent buildings that sprang up during the town's boom period when Bourke was a major river port for the expanding wool trade.

The site of the old London Bank is able to demonstrate the planning of the township of Bourke and its early subdivision. The old London Bank is an important and rare example of Victorian style bank architecture resulting from a period of prosperity in the region and the prediction of continuity. It demonstrates Bourke's recognition of financial institutions and business people and position as a significant inland riverport, rail head and business centre important in the further development of western NSW at the turn of the century and in the early decades of the twentieth century.

The combined banking chamber and residence retains its two-storey Victorian character, form and planning and contributes to the historic streetscape. It is the only surviving example of nineteenth-century banking in Bourke.

The barracks and dining room are reminders of a period of ownership by Tancred Brothers, a significant local industry, and its use as a boarding house for their employees, many of whom were migrants.

The old London Bank is a major landmark in Bourke. The site's successful adaptation as backpackers accommodation is evidence of the growth of two new industries in Bourke - that of tourism and heritage.

Old London Bank Building was listed on the New South Wales State Heritage Register on 2 April 1999 having satisfied the following criteria.

The place is important in demonstrating the course, or pattern, of cultural or natural history in New South Wales.

The configuration of the site of the Old London Bank of Australia demonstrates the first subdivision of allotments for the township of Bourke in 1862. It is evidence of a period of economic expansion in Bourke in the nineteenth century that encouraged banks to establish larger more permanent officers in the Darling River Town thus facilitation the settlement and development of the then remote areas of western NSW.

The premises were operated exclusively as a bank and managers residence for 53 years. Closure of the branch in 1942 was evidence of the pressure on Australian financial institutions to rationalise staff and resources in support of the war effort. The construction of the "barracks" and Tancred's dining room c. 1943 on the site is evidence of Tancred Brothers' provision of accommodation for their employees, including many new migrants. The continuing, though sporadic use of the buildings for accommodation reflects ongoing demand for casual lodging for itinerant workers and tourists. The site and its buildings continue to meet the needs of the local tourism industry at the same time emphasising several phases of Bourke's rich heritage and its contribution to the opening up and development of the State during the late nineteenth century and early decades of the twentieth century.

The place has a strong or special association with a person, or group of persons, of importance of cultural or natural history of New South Wales's history.

The Old London Bank, Bourke is associated with the rapid development and gradual implementation of controls on the Australian Banking industry in the nineteenth and twentieth centuries. The building is associated with the managers, the staff and their families who came to Bourke for professional reasons and participated in and contributed to community activities. It is also associated with the banks local clients who relied on the bank for financial advice and to support their business interests.

The Old London Bank has a strong association with Tancred Brothers Pty Ltd through the boarding house that they established on the site c. 1943 to accommodate meatworks employees. Fluctuations in the need to accommodate the rural workforce reflected cycle of boom and bust in the Australian Meat and Livestock industry.

The design of the Old London Bank is associated with Terry and Oakden, prominent bank architects based in Voctoria. The design of the building is not typical of the style for which they are best known. although the face brick treatment is reminiscent of Oakden.

The place is important in demonstrating aesthetic characteristics and/or a high degree of creative or technical achievement in New South Wales.

The Old London Bank is a good example of the character and style of financial institution architecture of the Victorian era. Like other bank building the combined banking chamber and residence demonstrates the scale planning, symmetry and landmark qualities associated with public buildings. The scale and detailing of the impressive edifice demonstrates the social and economic importance of banking and banks. The building is evidence of the status that nineteenth-century banks with to convey to customers and their optimism about the town's future. As such the building is a landmark building in the streetscape and provides a link with other nineteenth and early twentieth century elements in Oxlet Street such as the Post Office and Court House.

The deep verandah, sliding timber shutters and closable wall vents are important in demonstrating the methods architects Terry and Oakden, to deal with a hot and dusty environment such as that found in areas in western NSW.

The place has strong or special association with a particular community or cultural group in New South Wales for social, cultural or spiritual reasons.

The Old London Bank is held in high regard by the community as demonstrated by its inclusion on the Register of the National Trust, the State Heritage Register, State Heritage Inventory and Bourke Shire Council's LEP Heritage Schedule.

The old London Bank has a strong association with the Bourke community as a reminder of the significance of the bank as an institution integral to rural investment. It has a special association with the families of Bank Managers who were posted to Bourke, for whom it was often the first experience of life in western NSW.

The building's survival into the twenty-first century, adaptation for tourist accommodation and restoration is evidence of the community's awareness and appreciation of Bourke's heritage.

The place has potential to yield information that will contribute to an understanding of the cultural or natural history of New South Wales.

The Old London Bank has potential to yield information that will contribute to an understanding of the building materials and methods used in building in hot and dusty, outback environments such as Bourke in western NSW.

Some of the site is relatively undisturbed and has the potential to provide evidence of prior occupation in addition to superseded structures such as the stables, coach house, drains, cisterns and wells.

The place possesses uncommon, rare or endangered aspects of the cultural or natural history of New South Wales.

The Old London Bank is a rare example of a nineteenth-century banking building institution in Bourke. It is a rare reminder of Bourke's boomtime period and reputation as a key inland port, railhead and pastoral centre crucial in the opening up and development of western NSW in the late nineteenth and early twentieth century.

The place is important in demonstrating the principal characteristics of a class of cultural or natural places/environments in New South Wales.

The scale, form and planning of the Old London Bank is broadly representative of regional bank architecture of the late nineteenth century.
