= Yetta Dhinnakkal Centre =

Prison New South Wales, Australia

- Interactive map of Yetta Dhinnakkal Centre
- Location: Brewarrina, New South Wales; 30.350835°S 146.891024°E
- Status: Closed
- Security class: Minimum
- Opened: 2000
- Managed by: Corrective Services NSW

Yetta Dhinnakkal Centre, also known as the Brewarrina (Yetta Dhinnakkal) Centre, Brewarrina Correctional Centre and Brewarrina Prison, and referred to informally as Brewarrina jail, was an Australian minimum security prison for young Indigenous Australian men. It was located in Gongolgon, approximately 70 kilometres (43 mi) south of Brewarrina, New South Wales. The centre was operated by Corrective Services NSW, an agency of the Department of Communities and Justice, of the Government of New South Wales, until its closure in mid-2020. Many of its inmates were first offenders, and the centre offered various types of educational opportunities, in particular farming skills.

Yetta dhinnakkal is a phrase in the Ngemba language meaning "the right pathway".

== Facilities ==
In response to the rising number of Indigenous men being incarcerated in New South Wales prisons, Corrective Services NSW purchased a remote cattle station around 2000 and transformed it into an outdoor prison, without walls, bars, armed guards, or electric fences. Located on 10,553 hectares (26,080 acres) and opened in 2000, the centre was a working farming property, maintained by inmates under officer supervision and guided by elders. The centre's behavioural change programs targeted first-time young Aboriginal offenders aged from 18 to 25, through culturally relevant intensive case management. Vocational training courses were offered in information technology, horticulture, construction, visual arts and contemporary craft. Other practical skills, including small motor maintenance, welding, road sealing, building skills, literacy and numeracy and first aid are also provided.

The reoffending rate in 2004 was assessed at 20 per cent, compared with 40 per cent across NSW. In 2005/2006, the centre was awarded the Gold Award at the NSW Premier's Public Sector Awards in the Social Justice Category.

In January 2011, the centre was isolated by flooding waters affecting northern NSW and Queensland. During April 2011, there were five separate escapes from the minimum security centre.

The closure of the centre was announced in mid-2019, planned for 2020. Ownership of the site was split between the local Aboriginal land council and the Brewarrina Shire Council. Orana Haven was planning to lease the Shire's land and facilities for use as a drug and alcohol rehabilitation centre from sometime during 2021.
