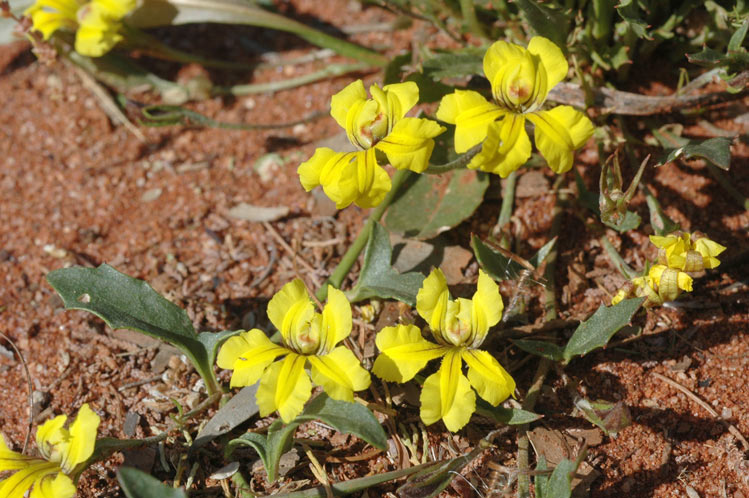
- Goodenia glabra near Goolgowi

Scientific classification
- Kingdom: Plantae
- Clade: Tracheophytes
- Clade: Angiosperms
- Clade: Eudicots
- Clade: Asterids
- Order: Asterales
- Family: Goodeniaceae
- Genus: Goodenia
- Species: G. glabra

Binomial name
- Goodenia glabra R.Br.
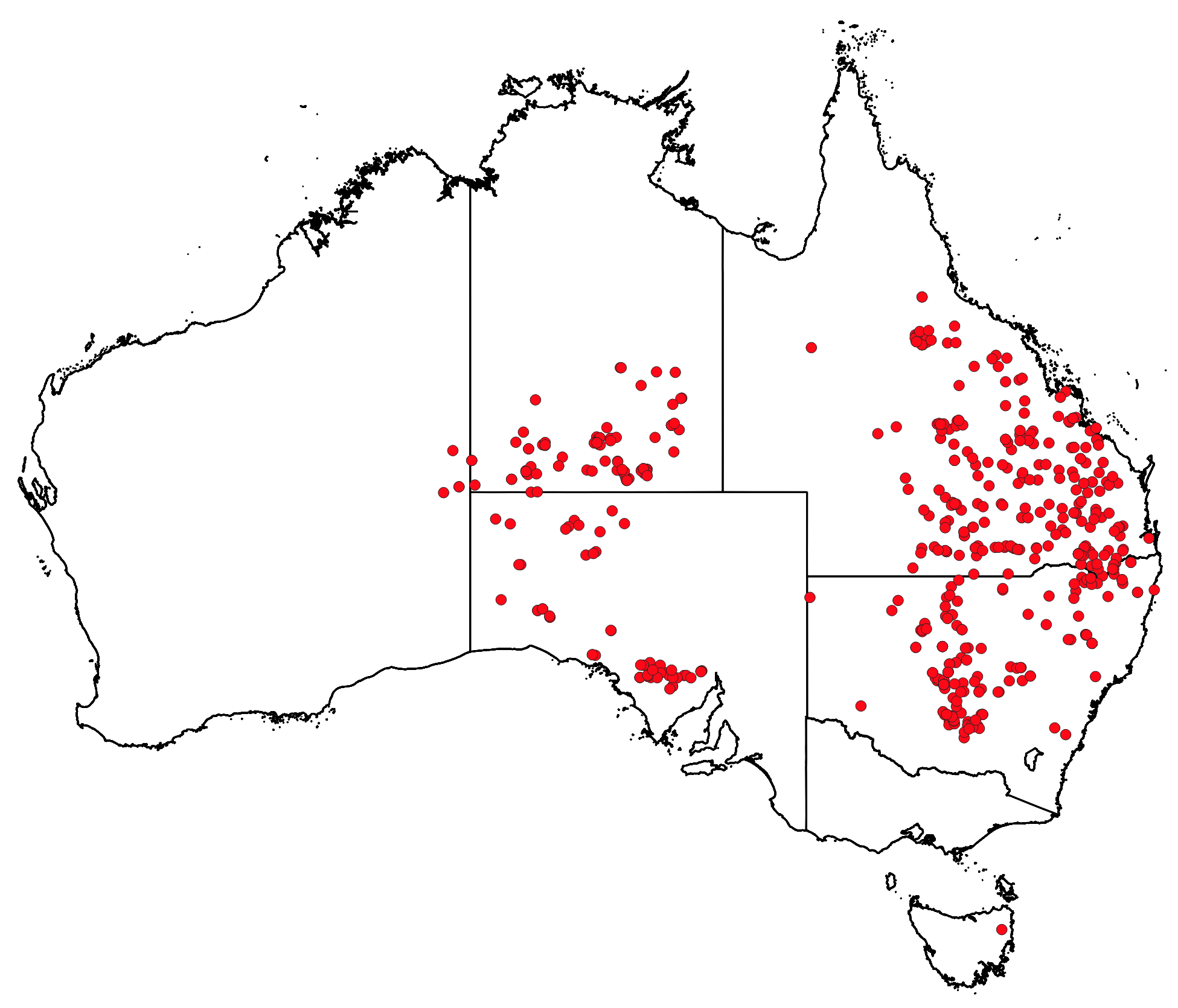
- Occurrence data from AVH

Synonyms
- Goodenia flagellifera de Vriese; Goodenia unilobata J.M.Black

= Goodenia glabra =

Shiny pansy

Species of plant

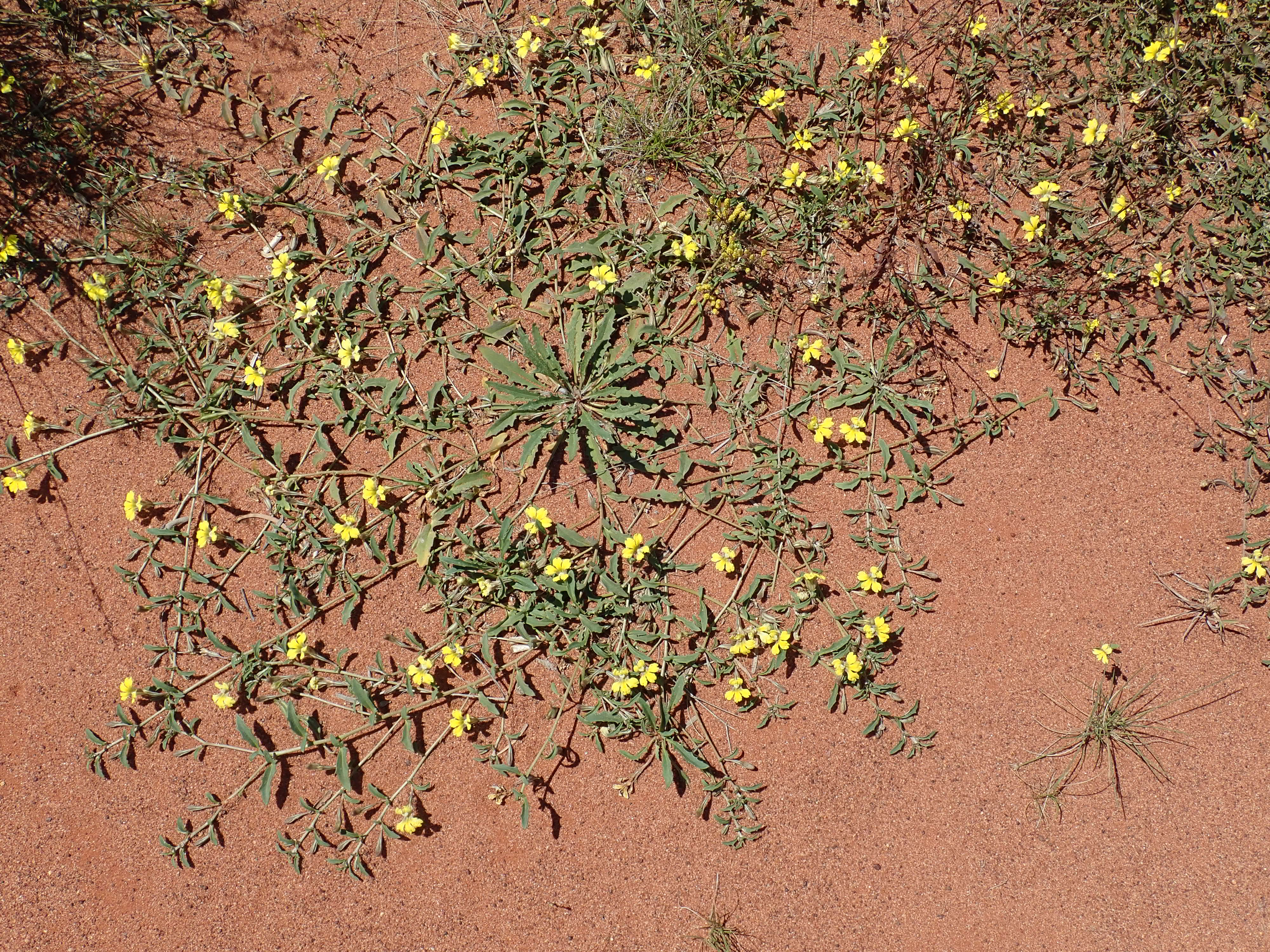
Habit near Enngonia

Goodenia glabra, commonly known as shiny pansy or smooth goodenia, is a species of flowering plant in the family Goodeniaceae and is endemic to drier inland areas of Australia. It is a prostrate to low-lying herb with lobed, oblong to egg-shaped leaves, and racemes of yellow flowers with purplish markings.

== Description ==
Goodenia glabra is a prostrate to low-lying herb that has stems up to 30 cm (12 in). The leaves at the base of the plant are narrow oblong to egg-shaped with the narrower end towards the base, 30–90 mm (1.2–3.5 in) long and 7–11 mm (0.28–0.43 in) wide with lobed or wavy edges, and those on the stem are smaller but broader. The flowers are arranged in racemes up to 250 mm (9.8 in) long on a peduncle 8–15 mm (0.31–0.59 in) long with leaf-like bracts at the base. Each flower is on a pedicel 8–20 mm (0.31–0.79 in) long with linear bracteoles about 3 mm (0.12 in) long. The sepals are linear to lance-shaped, 3–4 mm (0.12–0.16 in) long and the petals are yellow with purplish markings, 10–18 mm (0.39–0.71 in) long. The lower lobes of the corolla are 3–6.5 mm (0.12–0.26 in) long with wings 1.5–2.5 mm (0.059–0.098 in) wide. Flowering occurs in most months and the fruit is an oval capsule 7–10 mm (0.28–0.39 in) long.

== Taxonomy and naming ==
Goodenia glabra was first formally described in 1810 Robert Brown in his Prodromus Florae Novae Hollandiae et Insulae Van Diemen. The specific epithet (glabra) means "without hair".

== Distribution and habitat ==
Goodenia glabra grows in the drier inland parts of Western Australia, South Australia, the Northern Territory, Queensland and New South Wales.
