= Towers Drug Company Building =

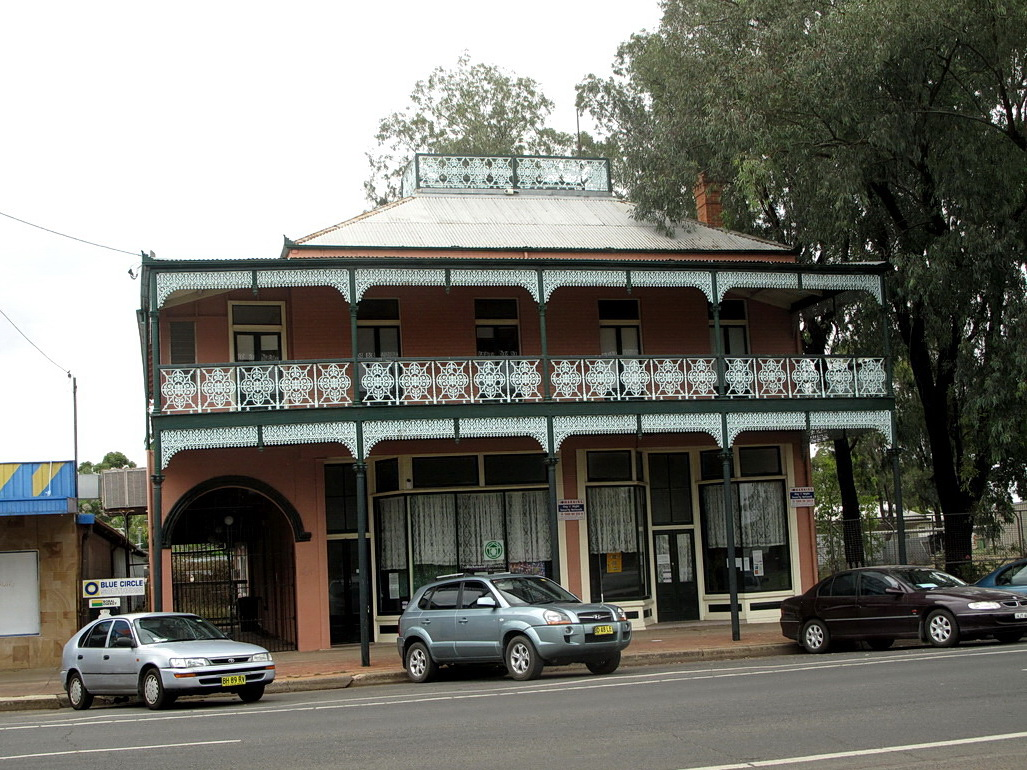

- Location within New South Wales Location within Australia
- 30.0886°S 145.9389°E
- Location: 45 Mitchell Street, Bourke, Bourke Shire, New South Wales, Australia

History
- Built: 1889–1890

New South Wales Heritage Register
- Official name: Towers Drug Company Building (former); Towers Drug Company Building
- Type: state heritage (built)
- Designated: 2 April 1999
- Reference no.: 383
- Type: historic site

Towers Drug Company Building is a heritage-listed commercial building and former medical centre and residence at 45 Mitchell Street, Bourke, Bourke Shire, New South Wales, Australia. It was built from 1889 to 1890. It was added to the New South Wales State Heritage Register on 2 April 1999.

== History ==
The building is on an allotment originally owned by early colonist T. A. Matthews. The building was erected in 1889/90 for Dr Sides as a medical centre and residence. The building was named after Mr Towers, a chemist who worked with him.

It survived the 1890 flood and a severe fire. Typhoid epidemics broke out after the flood in 1890 leading to the closure of all private wells. In all probability the hastily erected extensions at the rear could have occurred about this time to cope with the epidemics.

In 1908 the Council building was burnt down, destroying all records of original buildings and early photographs. Succeeding doctors used the Towers Drug Company Building until 1920.

After World War II there was a boom period and a building revival. The main shopping centre swung from Mitchell Street to Oxley Street. In the 1960s-1970s the building was used as a residence and the first floor side verandah closed in for extra bedrooms. It would have been about this time that the rear extensions to form a separate house would have been completed. Extra toilets were also constructed upstairs.

Between 1970 and 1975 the first floor was used as a coffee house for teenagers and dancing took place. Some fabric damage was caused to the building during this period prior to a notice being placed on the building by Council preventing further use of the first floor. Subsequent events indicate that the old and the new plumbing carried out was not of good workmanship. In 1976 a hairdresser took the lease to the front shop and extra plumbing was carried out. At the same time leaks in the plumbing were repaired. From 1976 stresses and subsequent major cracking of the building had taken place, probably accentuated by the general drying out and shrinkage of the foundation material, in particular the periphery footings.

The Bourke and District Historical Society used the premises from 1976 to 1996 as a museum and craft shop. The building was subject to an interim conservation order which lapsed in 1984. In 1985 the Heritage Council placed a Permanent Conservation order on the building. The building was restored in 1985 with funding/grant from the Heritage Council of NSW.

In 2018, the building is being used for serviced apartments, known as the Bourke Apartments, and for commercial office space.

== Description ==
The building consists of a two-storey structure at the front of the block and a single storey extension to the rear. The front section is basically of brick construction, with a lightweight first floor extension in the North West Corner. The rear section is partly brick, with a larger fibro extension to the rear.

The brick construction represents several stages of development. The building was constructed originally only to the rear of the present shops, extended to the rear of the two storey section without making any jointing, thence with straight joints an infill section and eventually to the rear, again with straight joints. Both floors are timber, and some internal walls to the first floor also lightweight construction. Footings are concrete.

== Heritage listing ==
Towers Drug Company Building was listed on the New South Wales State Heritage Register on 2 April 1999 having satisfied the following criteria.

The place is important in demonstrating aesthetic characteristics and/or a high degree of creative or technical achievement in New South Wales.

The building is significant in the streetscape of Bourke.
