= Enngonia =

- Town
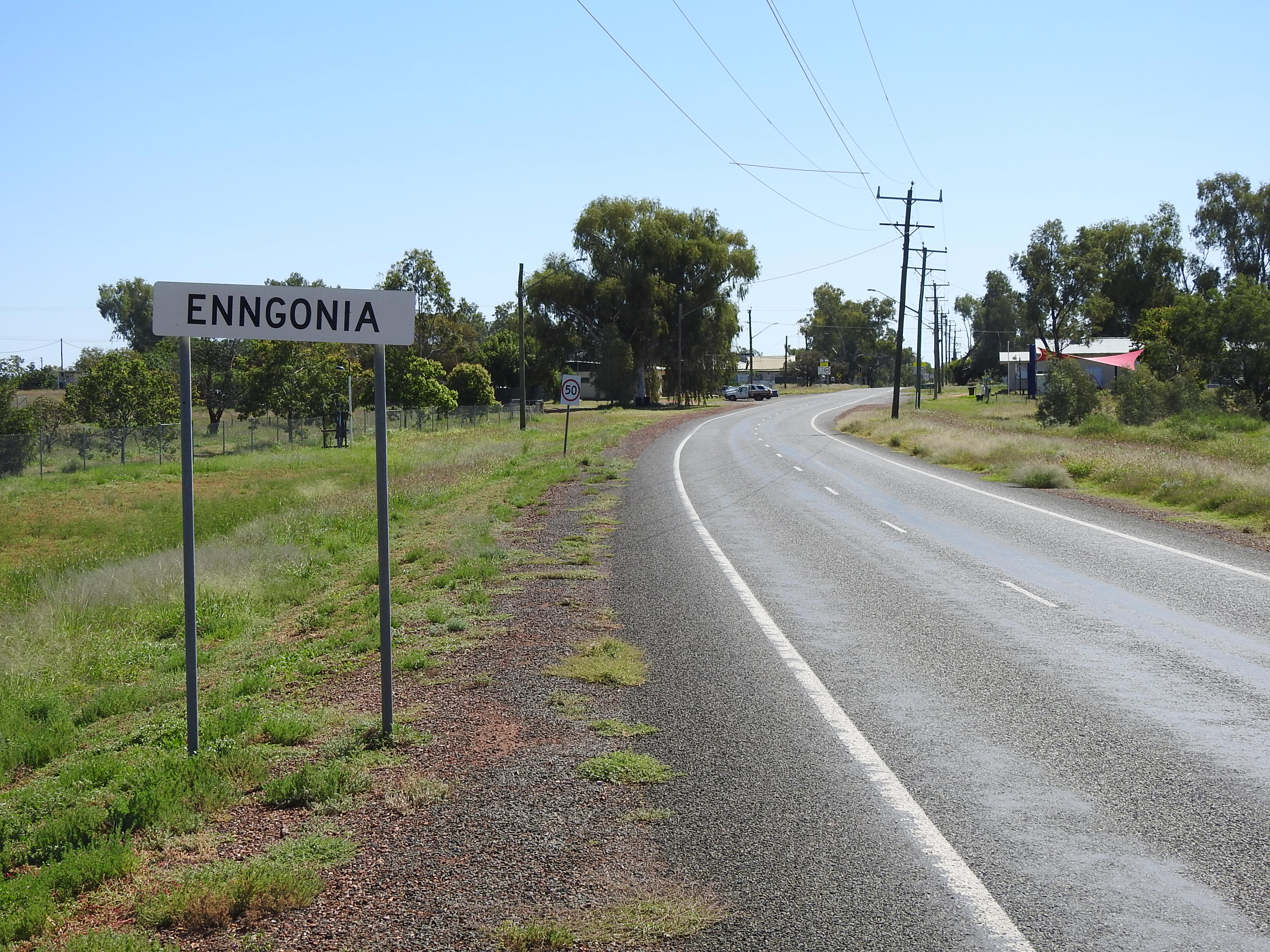
- Southern approach to town (2021).

- Coordinates: 29°19′08″S 145°50′47″E
- Country: Australia
- State: New South Wales
- LGA: Bourke Shire
- Location: 98 km (61 mi) N of Bourke, NSW; 160 km (99 mi) S of Cunnamulla, Qld

Government
  - State electorate: Barwon
  - Federal division: Parkes

Population
  - Total: 183 (2021 census)
- Time zone: AEDT
- Postcode: 2840
Localities around Enngonia
| Hungerford (Qld) | Barringun | Hebel (Qld) |
| Yantabulla | Enngonia | Ledknapper |
| Fords Bridge | Bourke | Brewarrina |

Enngonia, formerly known as Eringonia, is a small town in the north-west of New South Wales, Australia, in Bourke Shire, approximately 98 kilometres (61 mi) north of the regional centre of Bourke. The Warrego River runs just to the west of the town. The central street, Belalie Street, is otherwise the Mitchell Highway running north–south.

Enngonia is Muruwari First Nations country, bordering Kunja and Gunu countries. The town is in the Enngonia parish of the Culgoa County cadastral division.

== Etymology ==
In 1859, Cornelius "Con" Bride, a man with Irish ancestry, established a property along the Warrego River and called his rough shack, 'Erin's Gunyah' (gunyah being an Aboriginal word for 'hut'; effectively, 'Irish Hut'). It is known the location was otherwise first known as Eringunia and Eringunyah, then as Erringonia in 1861, and Eringa in 1862, then later as the township Enngonia.

== History ==
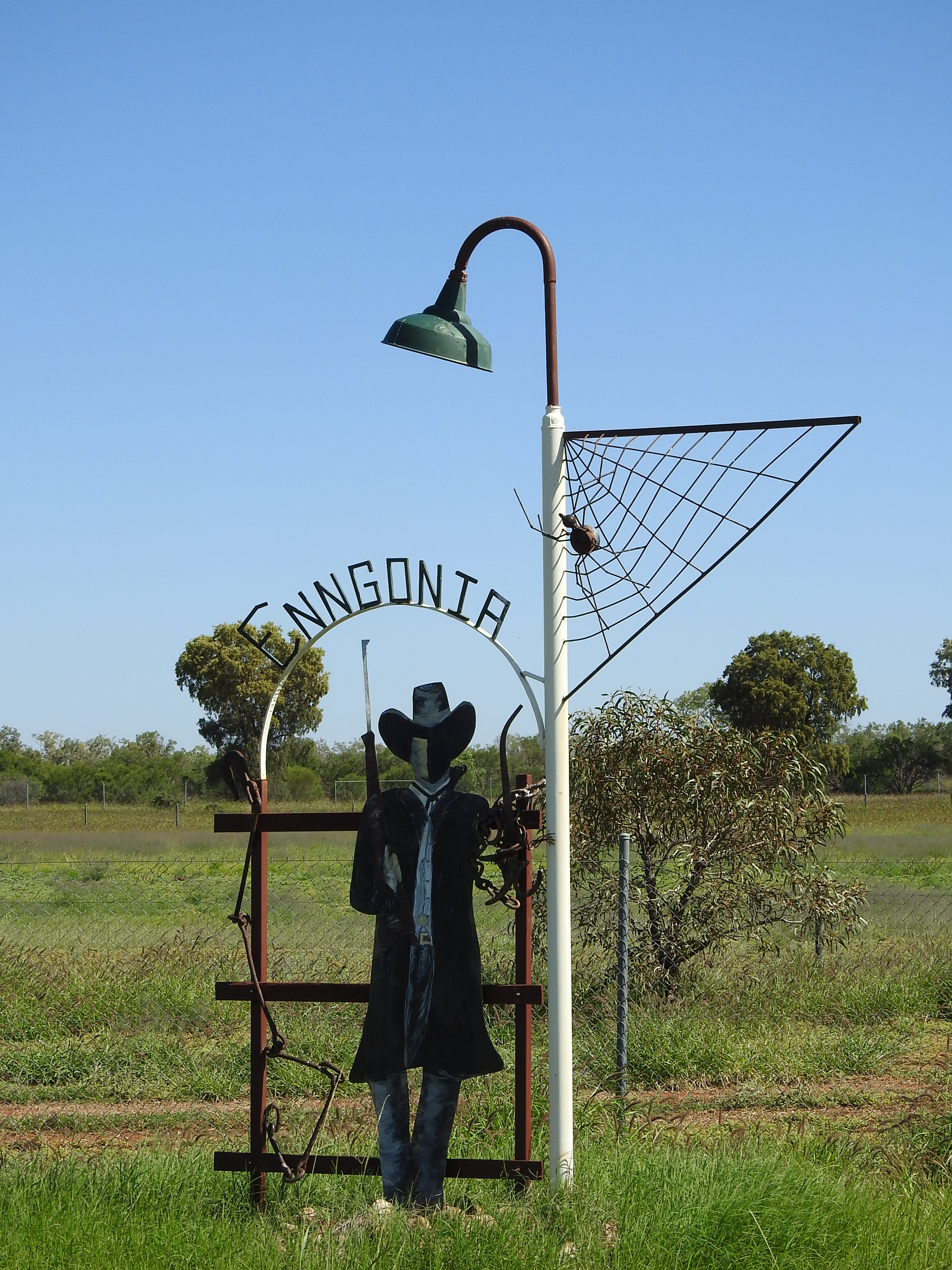
Metal artwork of a bushranger, southern approach to the town (2021).

In 1859, Con Bride, founded a horse station, naming his rough shack along the Warrego River, 'Erin's Gunyah'. Bride is regarded as one of the pioneer colonists of the lower Warrego River region and is better known for his leading role in the Hospital Creek Massacre of Aboriginal people which also occurred in 1859.

Given to be an isolated area, it became a centre for bushrangers and stock thieves, including around 1865 with the gentleman bushranger Captain Thunderbolt (1833–1870). Johnny Dunn (1846–1866), the last remaining member of Ben Hall's gang also did some horse breaking on the Culgoa, seeking not to attract the attention of the law.

A post office in the area was established at 'Rutherford's', now the sheep property of Belalie north of Enngonia. The Belalie Post Office was established on 16 June 1866, but the office was discontinued at times.

The first public hotel was Thomas Shearer's Shearer's Inn, who later became the postmaster. A Kerrigan was also the local mailman, while E. D. Johnson had the horse and sulky mail contract to eastern properties. Other public hotels included Kerrigan's Hotel, and H. C. Whittaker's Eringonia Hotel (c. 1893).

On 6 October 1868, Biree police officer Senior Constable John McCabe and an accompanying Queensland officer were at the Shearer's Inn when it was held up by bushrangers Charles Rutherford and Frank Pearson, alias Captain Starlight. THe officers engaged with the wanted men, where McCabe was shot and later died of the injury and resultant infection. A month later, Pearson was captured, and Rutherford was later shot dead while holding up a hotel.

The town was proclaimed in 1870. The 1890s Federation drought made a significant impact to the area, with many people abandoning their properties.

The first Enngonia Post Office opened on 1 March 1871, and the town's spelling standardised.

The bushranger Midnight, the nickname of the possible Thomas Law (who also used the aliases of A'lick Law, Thomas Smith, George Gibson and Harry Wilson), was shot and captured near the town on Sunday 6 October 1878 and died a few days later. He had escaped the Parramatta gaol in 1872, and had a reward for his capture. Law was involved in stock theft of cattle and horses. He escaped from a police constable at Brewarrina, before killing a police sergeant near Wonbobbie Station near Dubbo on 20 September 1878. Law was buried close to the Wapweelah Station homestead (later being named the Wirrawarra homestead). The Captain Starlight character of the 1888 bushranger novel Robbery Under Arms was based on Thomas Law.

With the telegraph line completed to the town, the amalgamated postal and telegraph office commenced on 1 May 1884, with 61 letters posted a week. This increased to 148 letters a week by 1888, and banking transactions also undertaken. The building was built at the corner of Belalie and McCabe Streets, opening on 8 February 1896.

The first school at Enngonia was opened in 1884 by Mrs Ellen Johnson. Despite being closed on numerous occasions, subject to repairs in 1893, being taught in 1923–24 by the bush nurse in lieu of a teacher, by 1970, the school was a two-story building with two-teachers. It also had a tennis court, and students saw an educational film each week, were taught gymnastics, singing, folk dancing, and had their own library.

A Cobb & Co. staging post for the stage coach was at John O'Shannessey's Post Office Hotel in the 1890s.

The post office became officially declared in November 1913, and by 1917, there were seven telephone subscribers in the area. Mail was despatched and received twice weekly.

The Enngonia branch of the Bush Nursing Association existed in the 1930s.

The post office was destroyed by fire on 12 February 1941 before being reconstructed. In between time, business was conducted from the police station including the 14 telephone subscribers, and a public telephone.

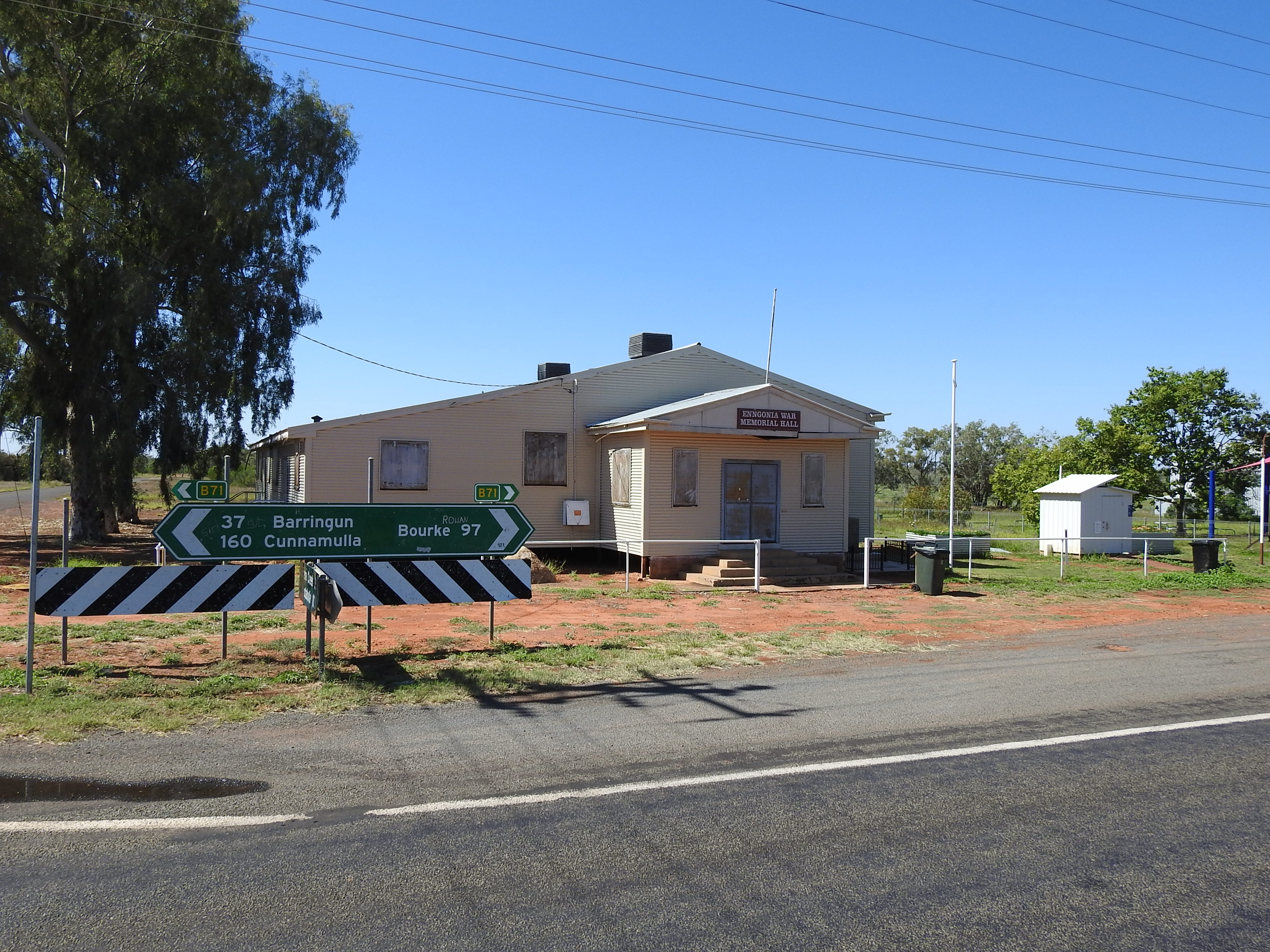
War memorial hall, Enngonia (2021).

Formed prior to 1954, the Enngonia War Memorial Hall Association, funds were raised for the hall erection which was officially opened on Saturday 18 August 1957. In the 1950s and 1960s the association organised sports and gymkhana days, followed by a grand dance. By September 1956, the hall debit balance was £2,226/19/0 (in 2020, A$70,115 equivalent). An Enngonia and District Progress Association also operated in the 1970s.

In the 1970s the town boasted a small but well-equipped racecourse, with a modern grandstand, club rooms, and an airstrip.

New Zealand–Australian ophthalmologist Fred Hollows established his trachoma treatments in restoring the sight of persons in Enngonia in the 1970s. Hollows' medical team would stay at the town's only hotel, the Oasis Hotel. An experience by Hollows in November 1973, and his correspondence with federal Attorney-General Lionel Murphy (1922–1986), contributed to the introduction of the Racial Discrimination Act 1975 (Cwlth), a statute to outlaw discrimination based on race.

... according to previously made arrangements I breakfasted at the Oasis having arrived from Bourke. We arranged for accommodation for all members of the party at the Motel. The new licensee, Mr. Short, then informed me that the aboriginal members of our party would not be served in the only bar and lounge of the Motel and if they required refreshments they were to walk around the back of the Motel and be served through a hatchway. ... Such discrimination makes my work both as an ophthalmologist to the total community and as a person especially interested in improving Aboriginal health very difficult...

In 2013 a group of persons declared the Murrawarri Republic micronation republic in a triangular area that encompassed Enngonia.

== Population ==
In 2021, there were 183 people in Enngonia, with 38 families, and 79 private dwellings.

- Aboriginal and Torres Strait Islander people made up 50.3% of the population.
- 59.0% of people were born in Australia and 71.6% spoke only English at home.

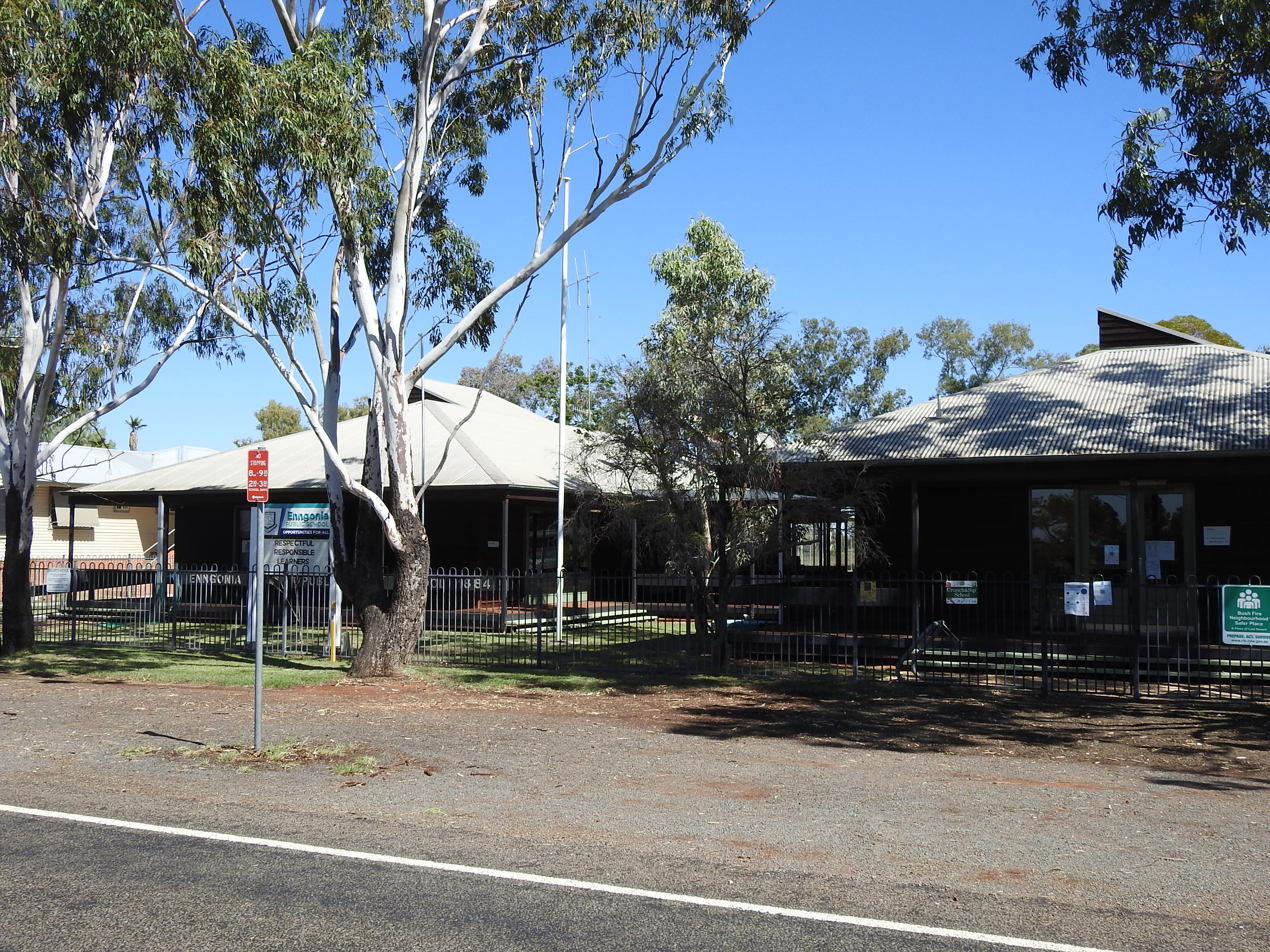
Public school, Enngonia (2021).

== Services ==
Enngonia has a public school, a post office, church, CWA rest room, and the Oasis public hotel.

For First Nations activities, the Murdi Paaki Regional Assembly works with the Murrawarri Local Aboriginal Lands Council to operate the Enngonia Community Working Party.

There is a NSW Police station.

Tennis courts and a sports oval are on the southern side of the town.

An annual horse racing event is held in September at the racecourse, 7 kilometres (4.3 mi) east of the town (29°16′41.5″S 145°53′50.9″E).

== Notable people ==
- Will H. Ogilvie (1869–1963), Scottish-Australian poet and bush balladeer. Nearby Belalie sheep station owned by William Scott, created prior to 1875, was the home of jackaroo and drover from 1889 to about 1893. His poem 'The back o' Bourke' led to the use of that expression to indicate a place of some distance away, several of his poems mention surrounding locations including Barringun. Fellow poet and friend of Ogilvie, Breaker Morant (1864–1902) also stayed in the area in 1895. A stone cairn, a copy of the Scottish Borders cairn, in Bourke is in memory of his presence and poetry within the shire.
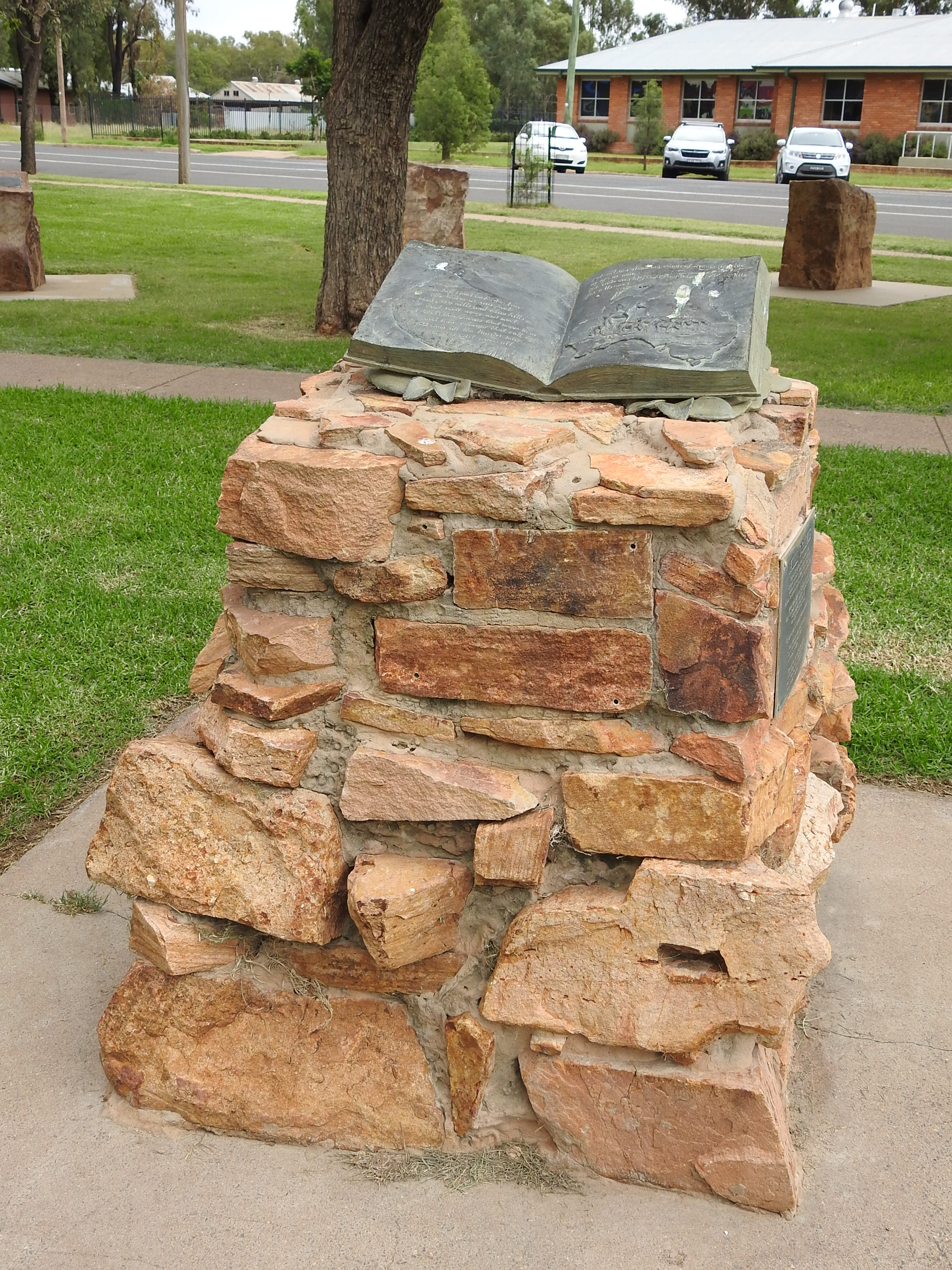
Stone cairn and bronze sculpture relating to Australian–Scottish poet Ogilvie, Bourke (2021).

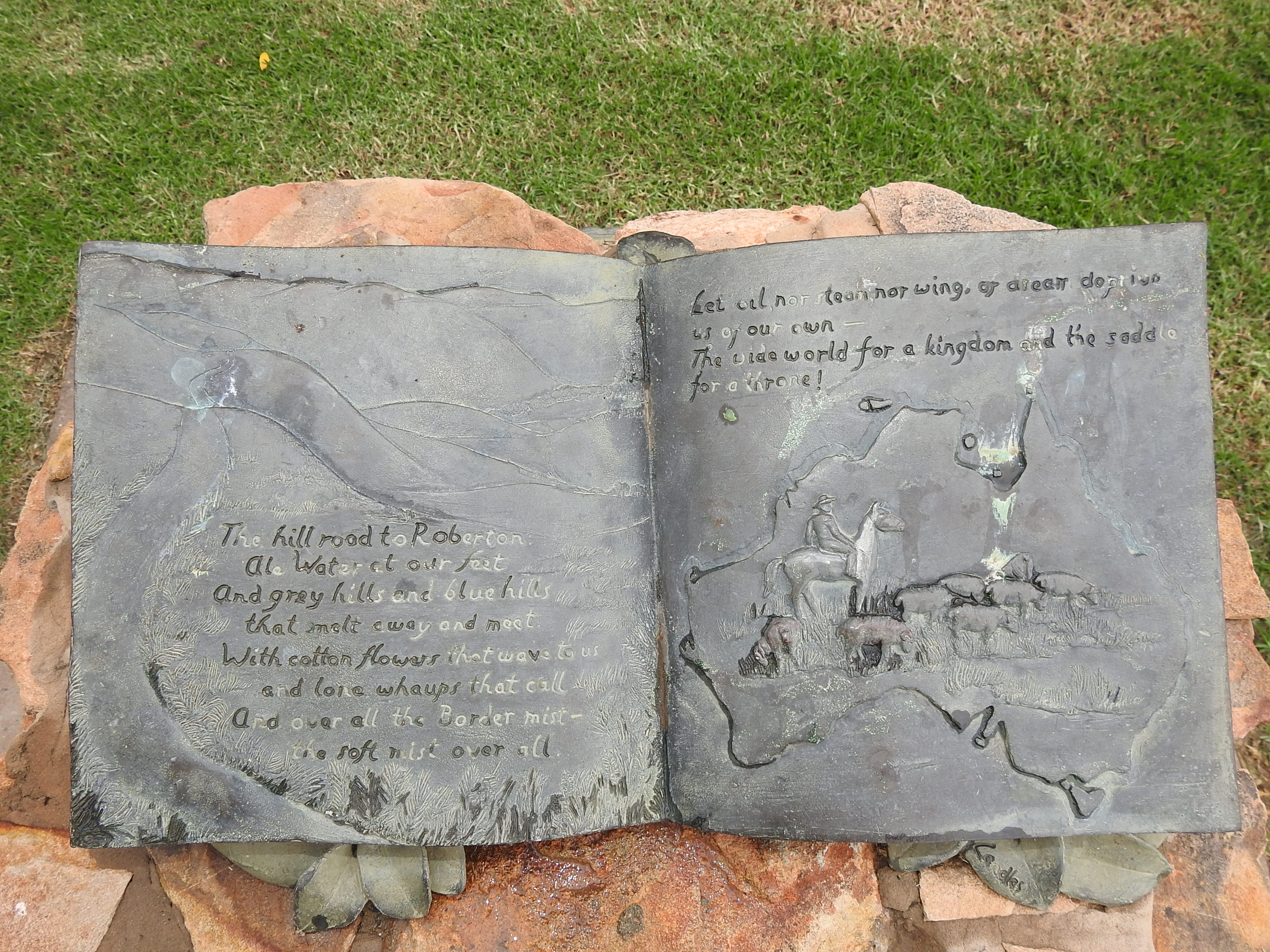
Ogilvie's stone cairn and bronze sculpture at Bourke (2021).

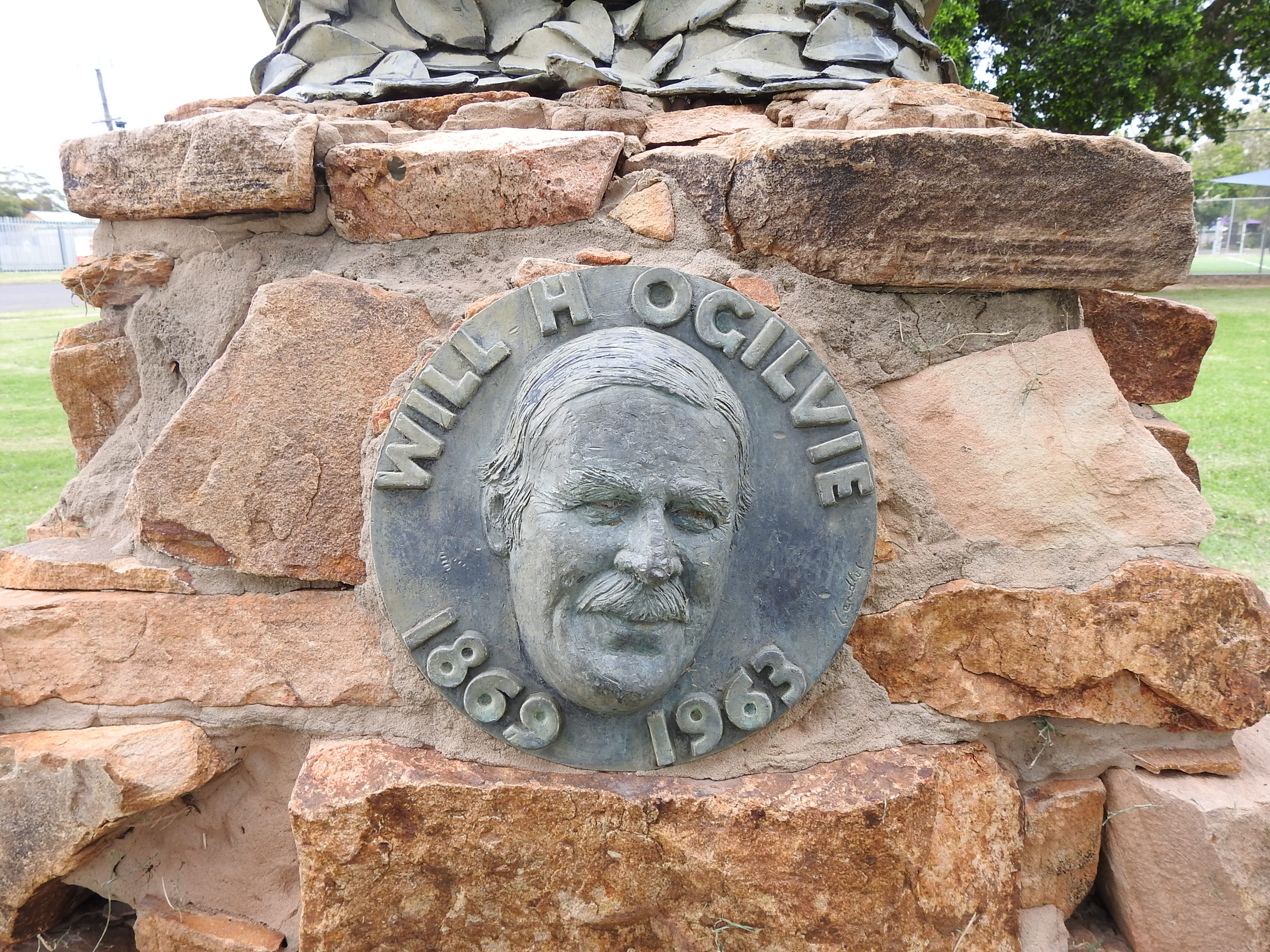
Ogilvie's bronze, at Bourke (2021).
- Fred Hollows (1929–1993), New Zealand–Australian ophthalmologist. Buried at nearby Bourke, Hollows established his trachoma treatments in restoring the sight of persons, particularly Indigenous Australians, in Enngonia in the 1970s. The experiences helped Hollows campaign for indigenous health care.

== Gallery ==
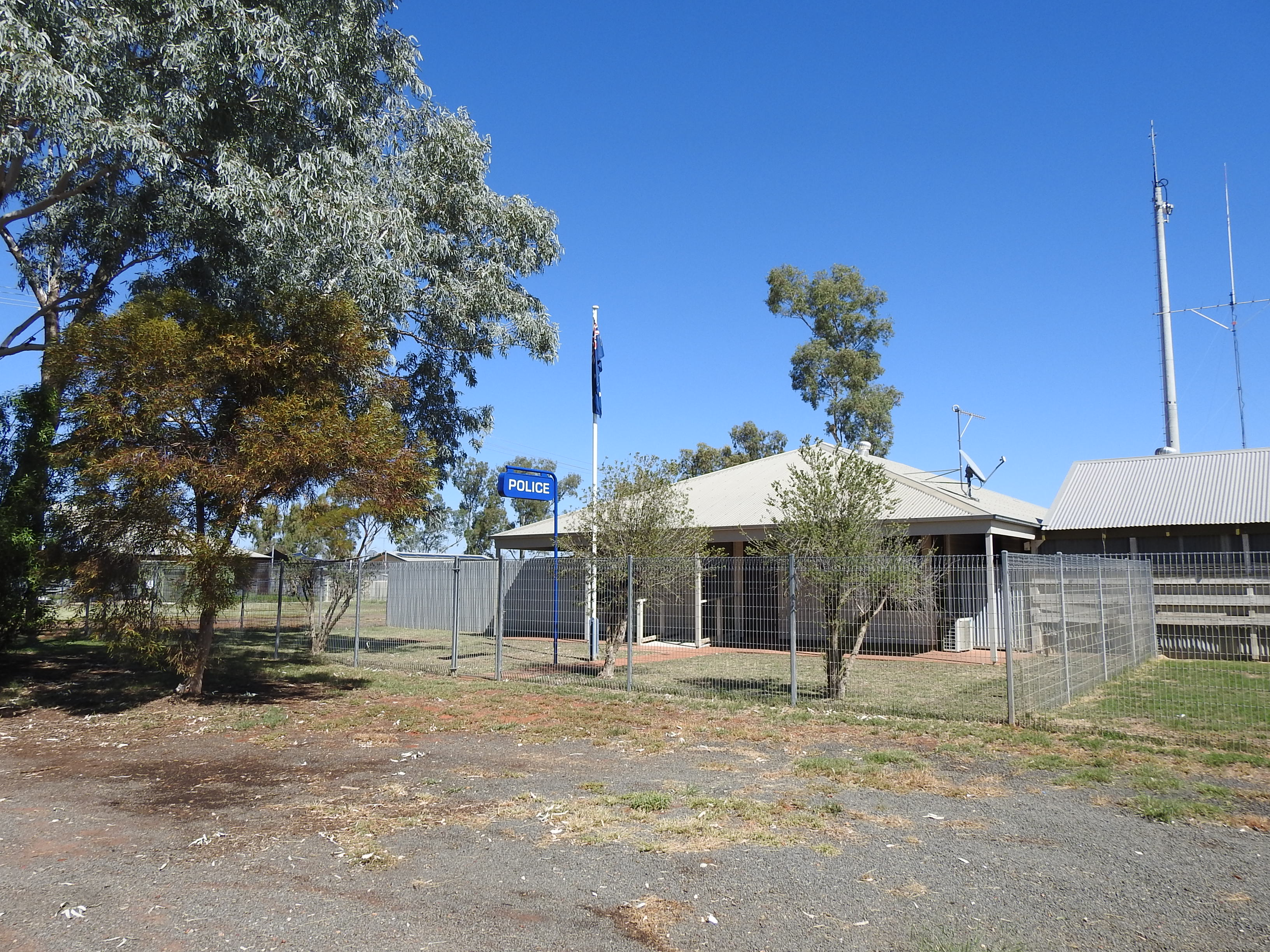
Police station (2021).

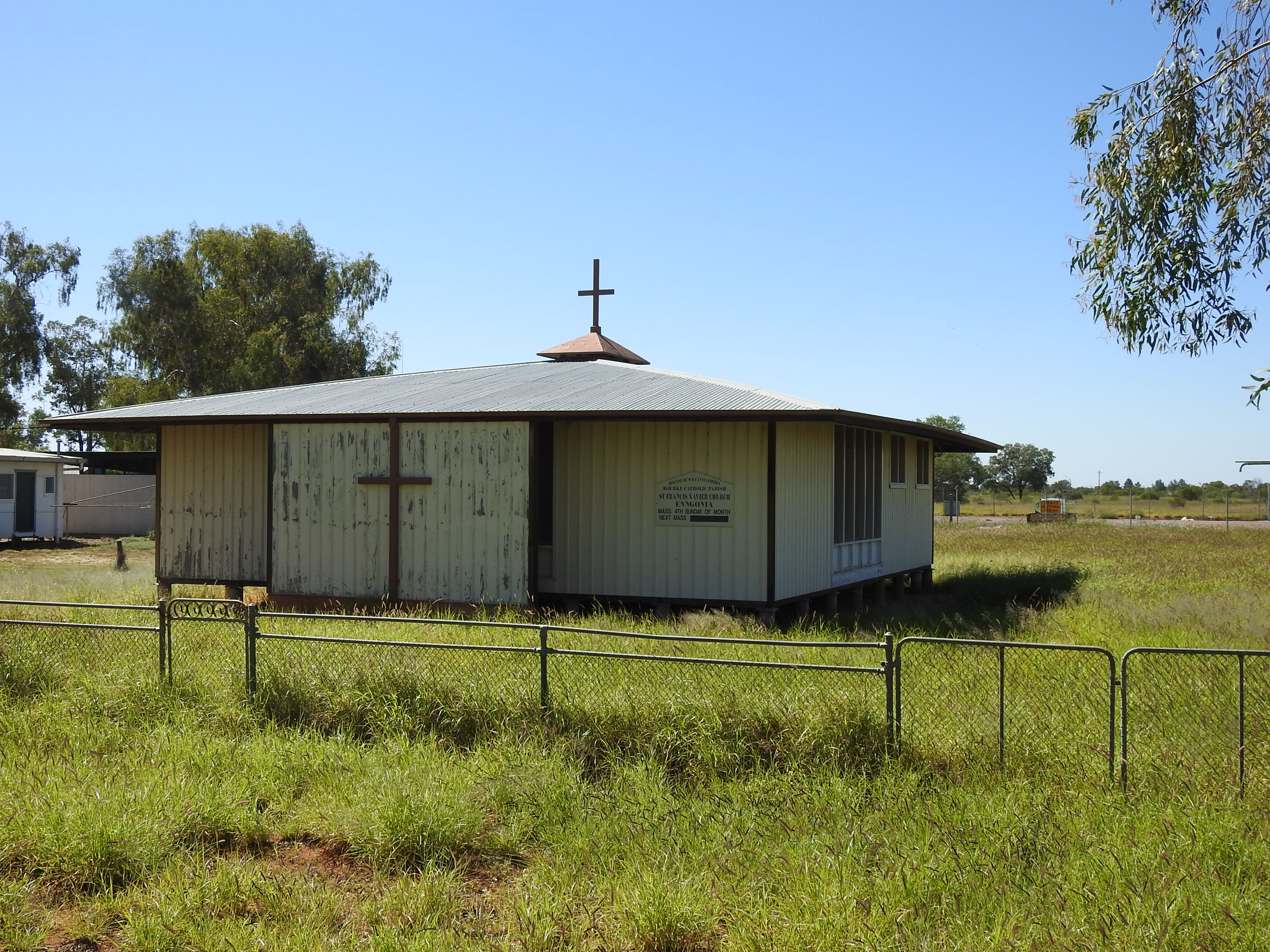
Saint Francis Xavier Catholic Church (2021).

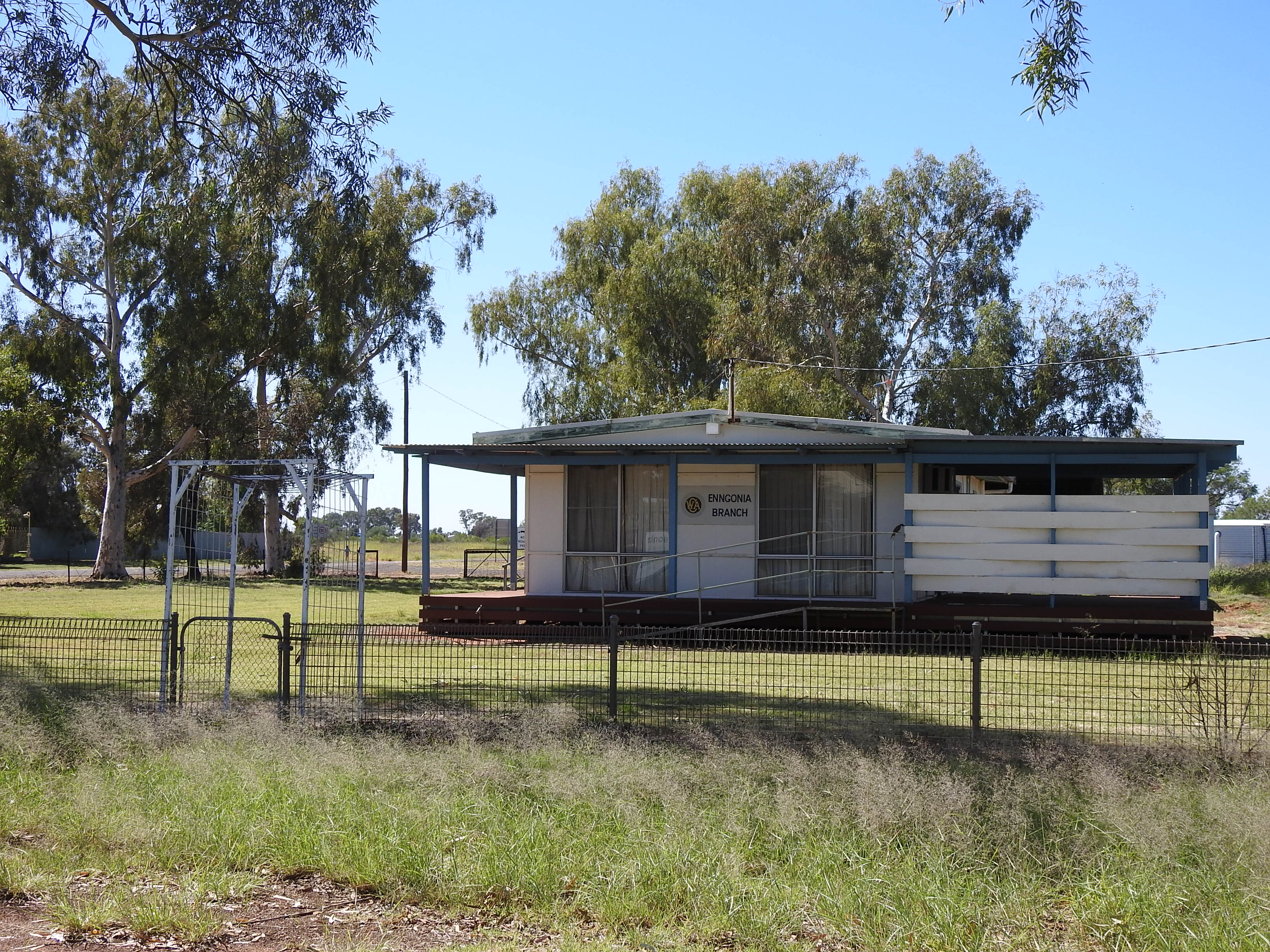
Country Women's Association rest room (2021).

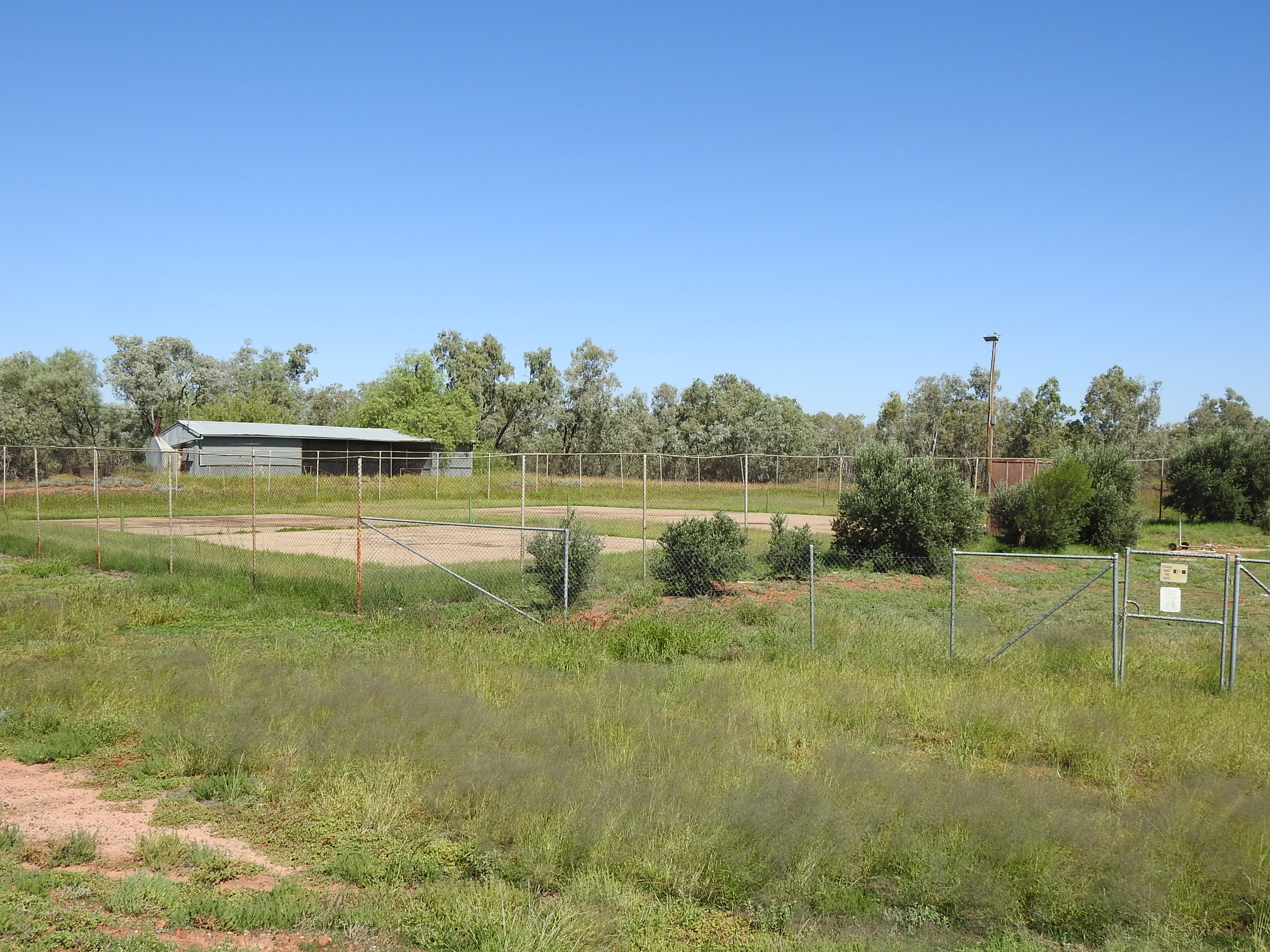
Tennis courts and oval on southside of the town (2021).

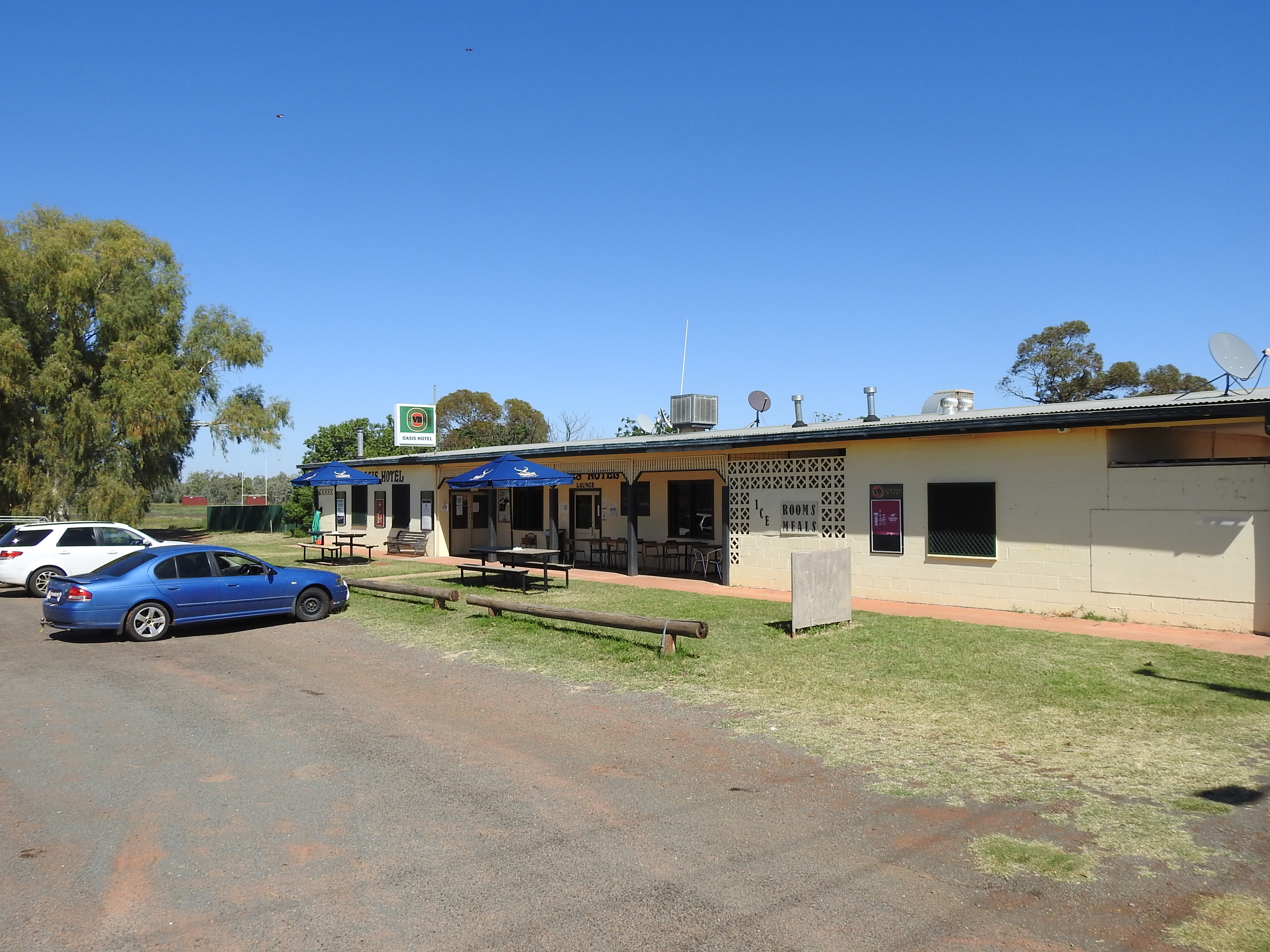
Oasis public hotel (2021).
