= Gongolgon =

- Town
- Coordinates: 30°21′54″S 146°55′04″E
- Country: Australia
- State: New South Wales
- Region: Orana
- LGA: Brewarrina Shire

Government
  - State electorate: Barwon
  - Federal division: Parkes

Population
  - Total: 31 (SAL 2021)
- Postcode: 2839
- County: Cowper
- Parish: Gongolgon

Gongolgon is a rural locality in Brewarrina Shire, in northern New South Wales, Australia, 566 km (352 mi) from Sydney. At the 2016 census, it had a population of 40 in 11 families. The median weekly household income was $537.

Gongolgon is located on the Brewarrina–Coolabah road. It is located 52 km (32 mi) from Byrock, 67 km (42 mi) from Brewarrina, 98 km (61 mi) from Coolabah and 131 km (81 mi) from Bourke. Gongolgon's nearest airport is Brewarrina Airport, 73 km (45 mi) away. Its nearest school is Brewarrina Christian School (3-8).

The Yetta Dhinnakkal Centre, a.k.a. Brewarrina jail, is located in Gongolgon.
