= Fords Bridge, New South Wales =

Fords Bridge New South Wales
- Coordinates: 29°45′09″S 145°25′29″E
- Population: 30 (2021 census)
- Postcode(s): 2840
- LGA(s): Bourke Shire
- County: Irrara
- State electorate(s): Barwon
- Federal division(s): Parkes

Fords Bridge is a remote outback village in northwestern New South Wales, Australia, within the local government area of Bourke Shire. It is 824 km northwest of Sydney, and 67.5 km west of Bourke. At the 2021 census, Fords Bridge had a population of 30.

== History ==
Back in the year 1880, in its earliest records, Fords Bridge was known as "Fords Crossing".

The very first significant private initiative in the area was initiated in January 1873 by Michheal McAuliffe who was granted a licence for his 'Salmon Ford Hotel'. However, he would transfer the license to Robert Ford and Arrowsmith in 1879.

== Notable people ==
Henry Lawson - lived and worked in the area.
