= Brewarrina Shire =

- Local government area
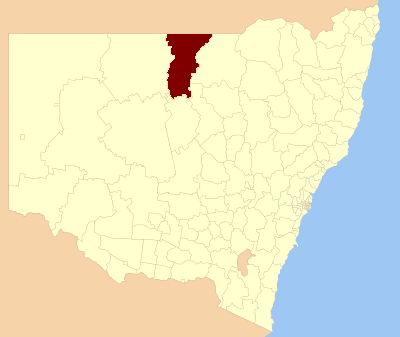
- Location in New South Wales

- Interactive map of Brewarrina Shire
- Coordinates: 29°57.6′S 146°51.6′E
- Country: Australia
- State: New South Wales
- Region: Orana
- Council seat: Brewarrina

Government
  - Mayor: Tommy Stanton (Independent)
  - State electorate: Barwon
  - Federal division: Parkes

Area
  - Total: 19,188 km^{2} (7,409 sq mi)

Population
  - Totals: 1,651 (2016 census); 1,356 (2021 census)
  - Density: 0.086043/km^{2} (0.22285/sq mi)
- Website: Brewarrina Shire
LGAs around Brewarrina Shire
Paroo (Qld)	Balonne (Qld)	Balonne (Qld)
Bourke	Brewarrina Shire	Walgett
Cobar	Bogan	Warren

Brewarrina Shire is a local government area in the Orana region of New South Wales, Australia. The Shire is located adjacent to the Darling River, which is known as the Barwon River upstream from Bourke; and located adjacent to the Kamilaroi Highway. The northern boundary of the Shire is located adjacent to the border between New South Wales and Queensland. The Shire is a wool and cotton growing area.

== Towns and villages ==
Brewarrina Shire includes Brewarrina and the villages of Gongolgon, Angledool and Goodooga and the ghost town of Tarcoon.

== Demographics ==
According to the Australian Bureau of Statistics during 2003–04, there were 500 wage and salary earners (ranked 163rd in New South Wales and 528th in Australia, less than 0.1% of both New South Wales's 2,558,415 and Australia's 7,831,856) with a total income of $17 million (ranked 162nd in New South Wales and 527nd in Australia, less than 0.1% of both New South Wales's $107 billion and Australia's $304 billion). It was an estimated average income per wage and salary earner of $33,530 (ranked 90th in New South Wales and 302nd in Australia, 81% of New South Wales's $41,407 and 86% of Australia's $38,820) and that median income per wage and salary earner of $32,230 (ranked 73rd in New South Wales and 245th in Australia, 91% of New South Wales's $35,479 and 94% of Australia's $34,149).

Selected historical census data for Brewarrina Shire local government area
Census year		2001	2006	2011	2016	2021
Population	Estimated residents on census night	2,056	▼1,944	▼1,766	▼1,651	▼1,356
Population	LGA rank in terms of size within New South Wales			129th	▲128th	128th
Population	% of New South Wales population	0.03%	0.03%	0.03%	▼0.02%	0.02%
Population	% of Australian population	0.010%	0.010%	▼0.008%	▼0.007%	▼0.005%
Cultural and language diversity						
Ancestry, top responses	Australian Aboriginal			31.2%	▼27.2%	▲46.2%
Ancestry, top responses	Australian			29.7%	▲30.0%	▼21.8%
Ancestry, top responses	English			15.8%	▲17.8%	▼21.5%
Ancestry, top responses	Irish			6.1%	▲6.9%	▲7.2%
Ancestry, top responses	Scottish			3.9%	▲4.6%	▲5.9%
Language, top responses (other than English)	Malayalam	n/c	n/c	n/c	▲0.5%	▲0.7%
Language, top responses (other than English)	Punjabi	n/c	n/c	n/c	n/c	▲0.7%
Language, top responses (other than English)	Other Australian Indigenous Languages, nec	n/c	n/c	▲0.3%	▼0.2%	▲0.4%
Language, top responses (other than English)	Afrikaans	n/c	▲0.2%	▼ n/c	n/c	▲0.2%
Language, top responses (other than English)	Nepali	n/c	n/c	n/c	n/c	▲0.2%
Religious affiliation						
Religious affiliation, top responses	No Religion	8.5%	▲15.2%	▲20.7%	▲28.5%	▲36.4%
Religious affiliation, top responses	Anglican	35.9%	▼33.3%	▼29.0%	▼20.9%	▼17.6%
Religious affiliation, top responses	Catholic	34.4%	▼27.4%	▲29.6%	▼26.3%	▼17.2%
Religious affiliation, top responses	Not Stated	n/c	n/c	n/c	▲14.0%	▲16.7%
Religious affiliation, top responses	Christian, nfd	n/c	n/c	n/c	▲2.2%	▲2.6%
Median weekly incomes						
Personal income	Median weekly personal income		A$316	A$369	A$439	A$553
Personal income	% of Australian median income		67.8%	▼64.0%	▲66.3%	▲68.7%
Family income	Median weekly family income		A$760	A$782	A$923	A$1,232
Family income	% of Australian median income		64.9%	▼52.8%	▲53.2%	▲58.1%
Household income	Median weekly household income		A$713	A$791	A$864	A$962
Household income	% of Australian median income		69.4%	▼64.1%	▼60.1%	▼55.1%

== Council ==
=== Current composition and election method ===
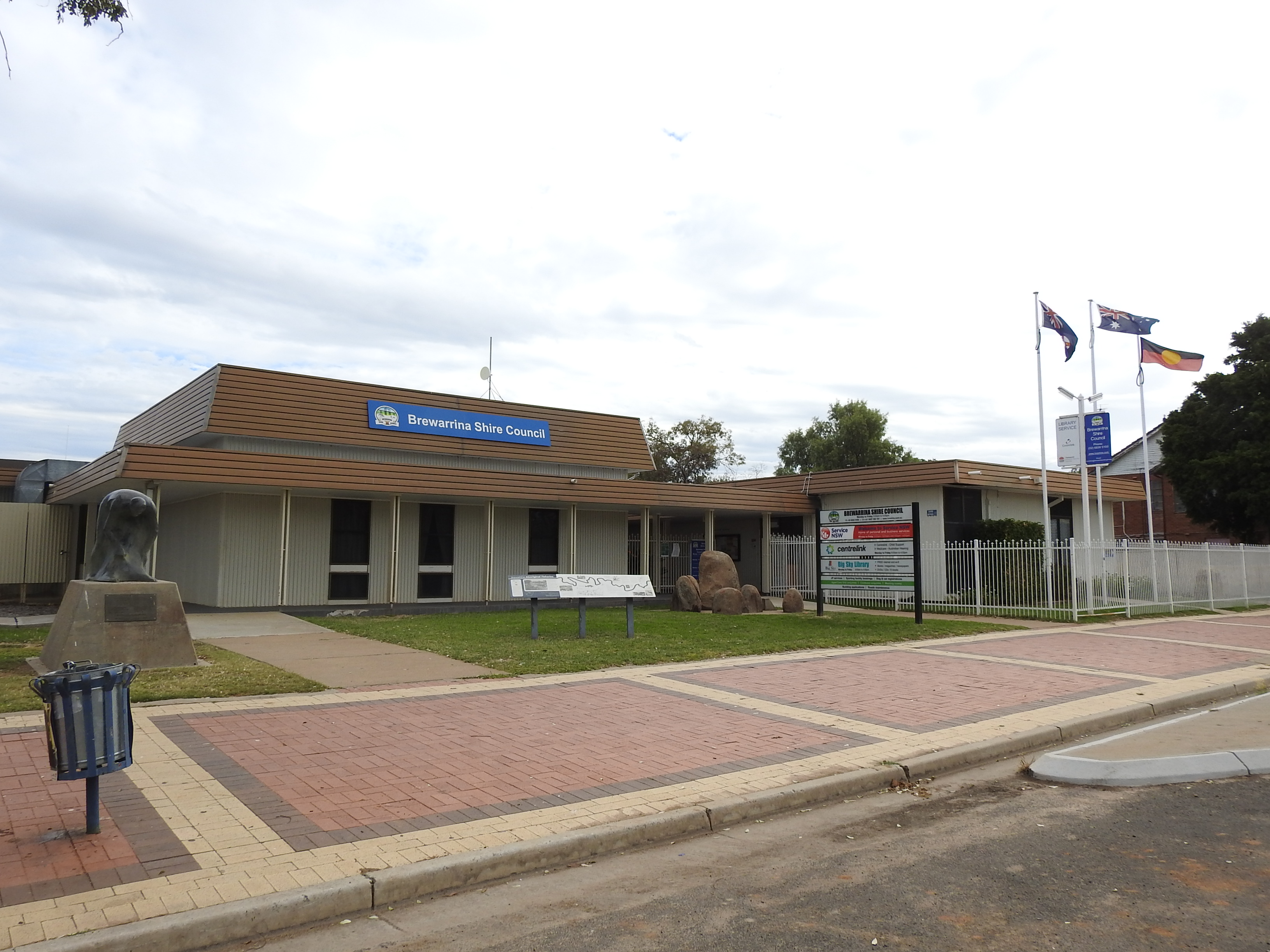
Brewarrina Shire Council chambers, 2021

Brewarrina Shire Council is composed of nine councillors elected proportionally as a single ward. All councillors are elected for a fixed four-year term of office. The mayor is elected by the councillors at the first meeting of the council. The most recent election was held on 4 December 2021, and the makeup of the council is as follows:

Party	Councillors
Independents and Unaligned	8
Greens	1
Total	9

The current Council, elected in 2024, in order of election, is:

Councillor	Party	Notes
Tommy Stanton	Independent	Mayor.
Vivian Slack-Smith	Independent	Deputy Mayor.
Mark Brown	Independent	
Belinda Colless	Independent	
Trish Frail	Greens	
Douglas Gordon	Independent	
Isaac Gordon	Independent	
Jason Morton	Independent	
Michael Pederson	Independent	

== Election results ==
=== 2024 ===
2024 New South Wales local elections: Brewarrina
Party	Candidate	Votes	%	±%
Independent	Vivian Slack-Smith (elected)	105	18.8	−8.2
Independent	Angelo Pippos (elected)	79	14.1	+2.5
Independent	Tommy Stanton (elected)	70	12.5	−6.1
Independent	Belinda Colless (elected)	68	12.1	+12.1
Independent	Mark Brown (elected)	50	8.9	+3.4
Independent	Douglas Gordon (elected)	46	8.2	−0.7
Independent	Michael Pedersen (elected)	39	7.0	+7.0
Independent	Jason Morton (elected)	33	5.9	+5.9
Greens	Trish Frail (elected)	29	5.2	−1.9
Independent	Isaac Gordon	23	4.1	−0.3
Independent	Noel Sheridan	18	3.2	−3.5
Total formal votes		560	96.1	
Informal votes		23	3.9	
Turnout		583	61.7	

=== 2021 ===
2021 New South Wales local elections: Brewarrina
Party	Candidate	Votes	%	±%
Independent	Vivian Slack-Smith (elected)	148	26.9	
Independent	Thomas Stanton (elected)	102	18.5	
Independent	Angelo Pippos (elected)	64	11.6	
Independent	Gordon Douglas (elected)	49	8.9	
Greens	Trish Frail (elected)	39	7.1	
Independent	Noel Sheridan (elected)	37	6.7	
Independent	Mark Brown (elected)	36	6.5	
Independent	Donna Jefferies (elected)	28	5.1	
Independent	Lily Shearer	24	4.4	
Independent	Isaac Gordon (elected)	23	4.2	
Total formal votes		550	97.0	
Informal votes		17	3.0	
Turnout		567	63.6	
Party total votes
Independent		511	92.9	
Greens		39	7.1	
Party total seats			Seats	±
Independent			8	▼1
Greens			1	▲1

== See also ==
- List of local government areas in New South Wales
