= Bourke Shire =

- Local government area
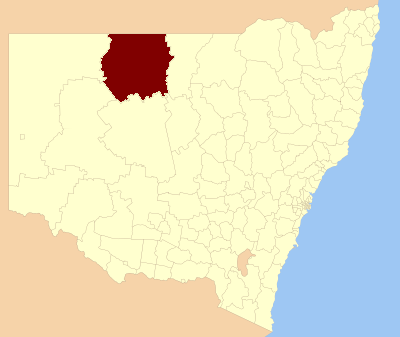
- Location in New South Wales

- Interactive map of Bourke Shire
- Coordinates: 30°06′S 145°56′E
- Country: Australia
- State: New South Wales
- Region: Orana
- Council seat: Bourke

Government
  - Mayor: Barry Hollman (Unaligned)
  - State electorate: Barwon
  - Federal division: Parkes

Area
  - Total: 41,679 km^{2} (16,092 sq mi)

Population
  - Totals: 2,834 (2016 census); 2,630 (2018 est.)
  - Density: 0.067996/km^{2} (0.17611/sq mi)
- Website: Bourke Shire
LGAs around Bourke Shire
Bulloo (Qld)	Paroo (Qld)	Balonne (Qld)
Unincorporated Far West	Bourke Shire	Brewarrina
Unincorporated Far West	Cobar	Bogan

Bourke Shire is a local government area in the Orana region of New South Wales, Australia. The Shire is located adjacent to the Darling River, which is known as the Barwon River upstream from Bourke; and located adjacent to the Mitchell Highway. The northern boundary of the Shire is located adjacent to the border between New South Wales and Queensland. The shire is a wool and beef producing area.

The mayor of Bourke Shire Council is Barry Hollman, an unaligned politician.

== History ==
The Bourke LGA (local government area) was traditionally home to around fifteen Aboriginal groups. The people of the region were traditionally hunter-gatherers as well as seed harvesters, who managed the environment. These traditional landowners have been identified as belonging to five main groups, the Ngiyampaa, Barranbinya, Paruntji, Naualko, and Muruwari peoples. Aboriginal people consulted for a 2019 Aboriginal heritage study identified the Bourke LGA as the traditional country of the Barkindji people, Bardaji people, Murrawari (Muruwari) people, Nyemba (Ngiyampaa) people, and Nyirrpa people, who each occupied different areas. The boundaries of the land they occupied were defined largely by rivers, landforms, and areas of access to seasonal environmental resources.

== Main towns and villages ==
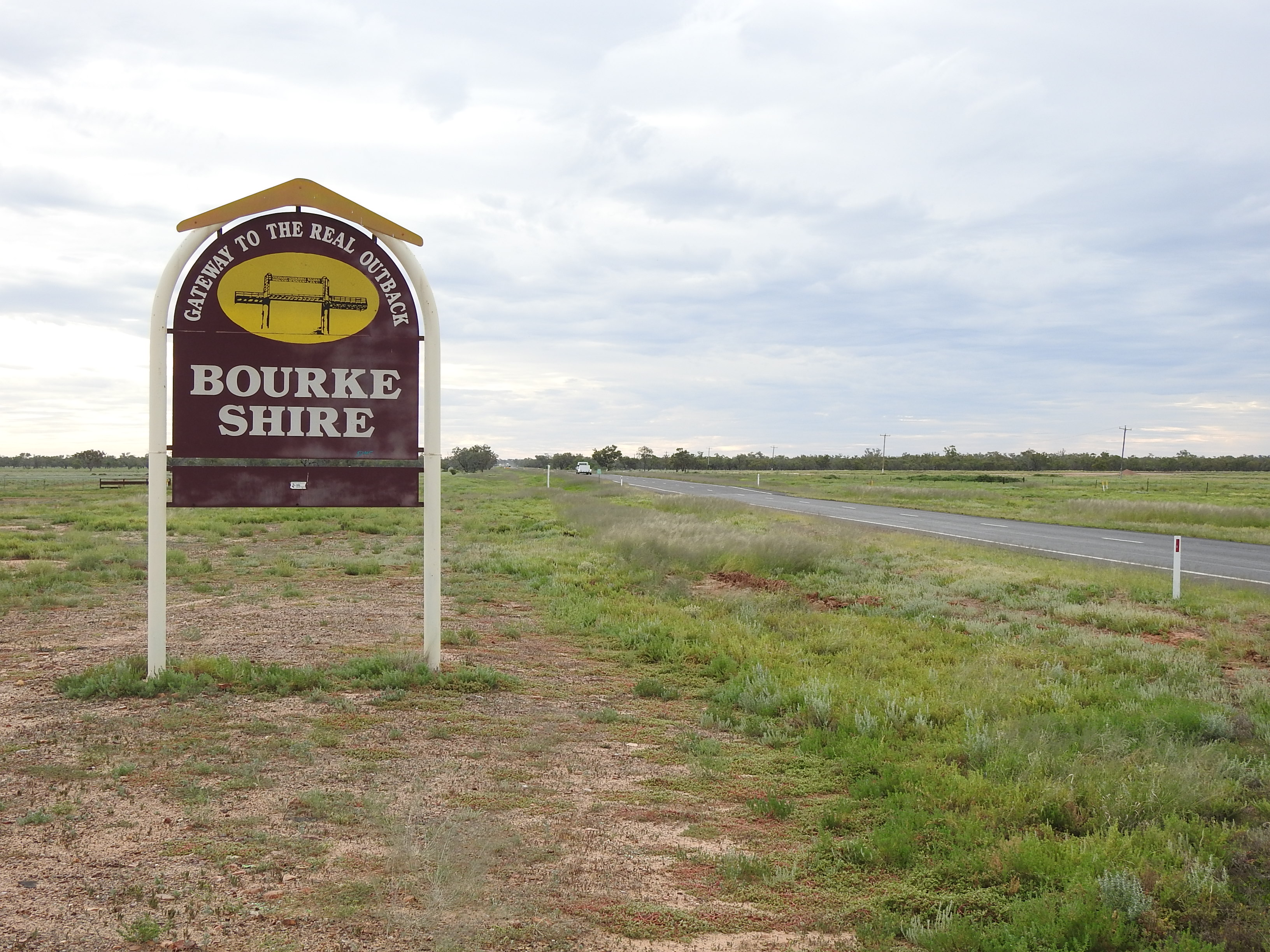
Bourke Shire Council sign, bordering with Brewarrina (2021)

Bourke Shire includes Bourke and the very small outback towns of Byrock, Enngonia, Fords Bridge, Wanaaring and Louth.

== Demographics ==
According to the Australian Bureau of Statistics during 2003–04 there:

- were 1,062 wage and salary earners (ranked 141st in New South Wales and 457th in Australia, less than 0.1% of both New South Wales's 2,558,415 and Australia's 7,831,856)
- was a total income of $36 million (ranked 137th in New South Wales and 449th in Australia, less than 0.1% of both New South Wales's $107 billion and Australia's $304 billion)
- was an estimated average income per wage and salary earner of $33,611 (ranked 88th in New South Wales and 298th in Australia, 81% of New South Wales's $41,407 and 87% of Australia's $38,820)
- was an estimated median income per wage and salary earner of $32,426 (ranked 71st in New South Wales and 235th in Australia, 91% of New South Wales's $35,479 and 95% of Australia's $34,149).

Selected historical census data for Bourke Shire local government area
Census year		2011	2016	2021
Population	Estimated residents on census night	2,868	▼2,634	▼2,340
Population	LGA rank in terms of size within New South Wales	122nd	▼125th	125th
Population	% of New South Wales population	0.04%	0.04%	▼0.03%
Population	% of Australian population	0.01%	0.01%	0.01%
Cultural and language diversity				
Ancestry, top responses	Australian	38.3%	▲39.4%	▼33.6%
Ancestry, top responses	English	23.8%	▼22.1%	▲30.0%
Ancestry, top responses	Australian Aboriginal	4.0%	▲4.7%	▲25.5%
Ancestry, top responses	Irish	7.8%	▼7.1%	▲9.6%
Ancestry, top responses	Scottish	5.1%	▼4.2%	▲6.2%
Language, top responses (other than English)	Nepali	n/c	▲0.7%	▼0.6%
Language, top responses (other than English)	Malayalam	n/c	n/c	▲0.3%
Language, top responses (other than English)	Telugu	n/c	n/c	▲0.2%
Language, top responses (other than English)	Greek	n/c	n/c	▲0.2%
Religious affiliation				
Religious affiliation, top responses	Catholic	41.5%	▼36.5%	▼34.1%
Religious affiliation, top responses	No religion	8.6%	▲12.7%	▲20.6%
Religious affiliation, top responses	Not stated	n/c	▲20.1%	▼19.0%
Religious affiliation, top responses	Anglican	21.1%	▼17.7%	▼13.8%
Religious affiliation, top responses	Presbyterian and Reformed	4.5%	▼3.6%	▼2.7%
Median weekly incomes				
Personal income	Median weekly personal income	A$600	A$719	A$862
Personal income	% of Australian median income	104.0%	▲108.6%	▼107.1%
Family income	Median weekly family income	A$1238	A$1562	A$1899
Family income	% of Australian median income	83.6%	▲90.1%	▼89.6%
Household income	Median weekly household income	A$1085	A$1243	A$1559
Household income	% of Australian median income	87.9%	▼86.4%	▲89.3%

== Council ==
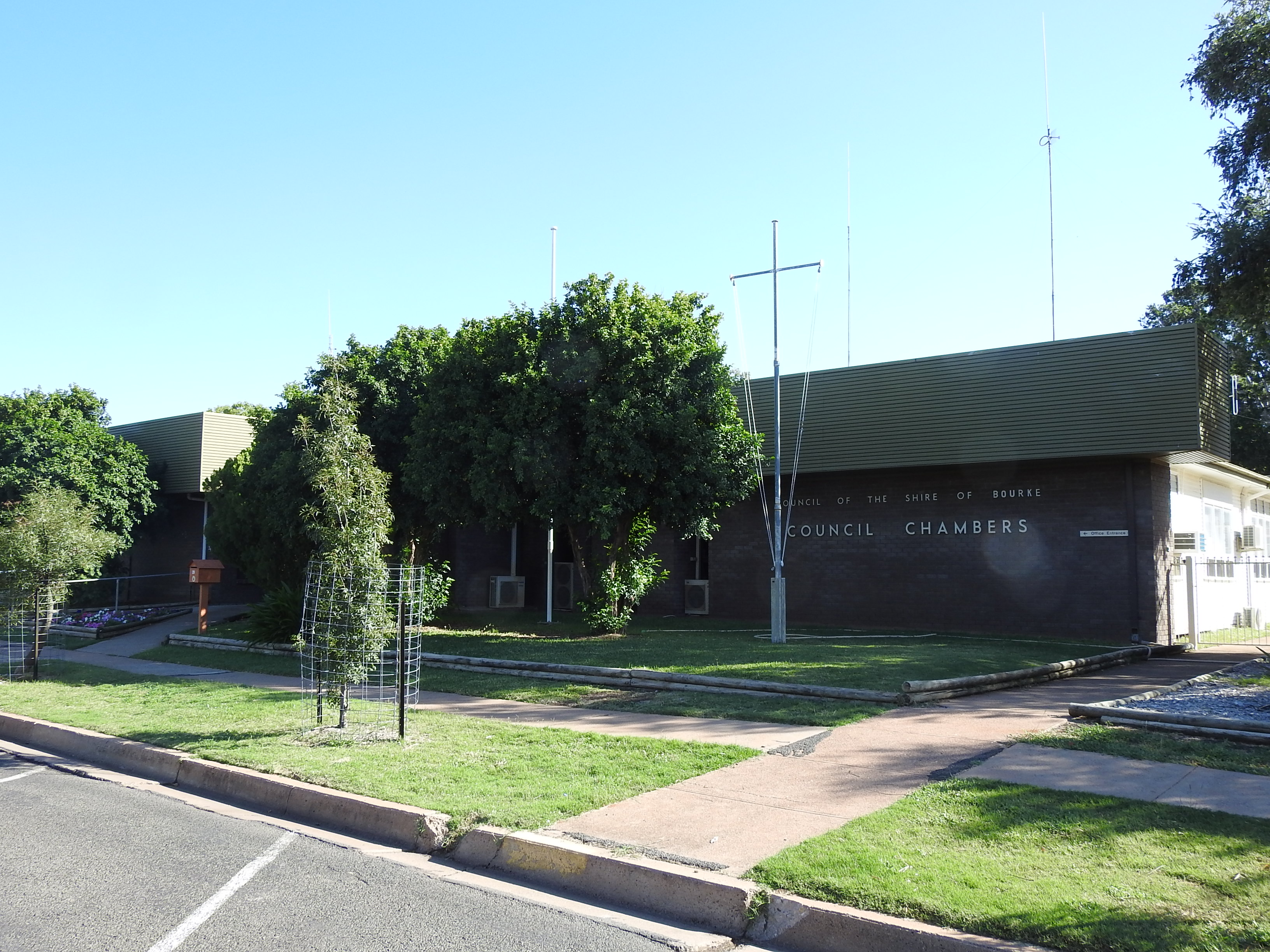
Bourke Shire Council chambers, Mitchell Street, Bourke (2021)

=== Current composition and election method ===
Bourke Shire Council is composed of ten councillors elected proportionally as a single ward. All councillors are elected for a fixed four-year term of office. The mayor is elected by the councillors at the first meeting of the council. The most recent election was held on 10 September 2016, and the makeup of the council is as follows:

Party	Councillors
Independents and Unaligned	10
Total	10

The current Council, elected in 2021, in order of election, is:

Councillor	Party	Notes
Victor Bartley	Independent	
Sarah Barton	Independent	
Sally Davis	Unaligned	
Cec Dorrington	Unaligned	
Lachlan Ford	Independent	Deputy Mayor
Barry Hollman	Unaligned	Mayor
Samuel Rice	Independent	
Grace Ridge	Unaligned	
Nathan Ryan	Independent	
Bob Stutsel	Independent	

== Election results ==
=== 2024 ===
2024 New South Wales local elections: Bourke
Party	Candidate	Votes	%	±%
Independent	Patricia Bates-Canty (elected)	133	11.8	
Independent	Scott McAdam (elected)	120	10.7	
Independent	Maxime Nina (elected)	105	9.3	
Independent	Sarah Barton (elected)	98	8.7	
Independent	Samuel Rice (elected)	94	8.4	
Independent	Lachlan Ford (elected)	92	8.2	
Independent	Sally Davis (elected)	88	7.8	
Independent	Francis Kerr (elected)	87	7.7	
Independent	Kylie Baty (elected)	75	6.7	
Independent	Bob Stutsel (elected)	73	6.5	
Independent	Nathan Ryan	61	5.4	
Independent	Victor Bartley	53	4.7	
Independent	Cecil Dorrington	27	2.4	
Independent	Grace Ridge	20	1.8	
Total formal votes		1,126	96.7	
Informal votes		38	3.3	
Turnout		1,164	67.2	

=== 2021 ===
2021 New South Wales local elections: Bourke
Party	Candidate	Votes	%	±%
Independent	Victor Bartley (elected)	unopposed		
Independent	Sarah Barton (elected)	unopposed		
Independent	Sally Davis (elected)	unopposed		
Independent	Cec Dorrington (elected)	unopposed		
Independent	Lachlan Ford (elected)	unopposed		
Independent	Barry Hollman (elected)	unopposed		
Independent	Samuel Rice (elected)	unopposed		
Independent	Grace Ridge (elected)	unopposed		
Independent	Nathan Ryan (elected)	unopposed		
Independent	Bob Stutsel (elected)	unopposed		
Registered electors		1,775		

== Notable persons ==
In 1884, Sid 'Combo' Ross set a record by shearing nine lambs in nine minutes.

Scottish-Australian poet balladeer Will. H. Ogilvie (1869–1963) worked on Belalie Station on the Warrego River, composed many of his poems in the 1890s. Belalie is between the township of Enngonia (formerly Eringunia) and the Queensland border.

Edward Dickens, the son of English novelist Charles Dickens, was elected as alderman in the 1880s.
