= Newcastle Knights awards and achievements =

List of awards and honours earned by players of the Newcastle Knights NRL club

This article lists awards and honours that players of the Newcastle Knights club have received.

== RLIF Awards ==
=== Rugby League Golden Boot ===
1999

- Andrew Johns

2001

- Andrew Johns

== Dally M Awards ==
=== Player of the Year (Dally M Medal) ===
1998

- Andrew Johns

1999

- Andrew Johns

2002

- Andrew Johns

2004

- Danny Buderus

2023

- Kalyn Ponga

=== Fullback of the Year ===
2023

- Kalyn Ponga

=== Winger of the Year ===
1990

- Ashley Gordon

1995

- Jamie Ainscough

2006

- Brian Carney

2010

- Akuila Uate

2011

- Akuila Uate

2012

- Akuila Uate

=== Halfback of the Year ===
1995

- Andrew Johns

1998

- Andrew Johns

1999

- Andrew Johns

2002

- Andrew Johns

=== Prop of the Year ===
1996

- Paul Harragon

=== Hooker of the Year ===
2002

- Danny Buderus

2004

- Danny Buderus

2005

- Danny Buderus

=== Rookie of the Year ===
1992

- Matthew Rodwell

=== Representative Player of the Year ===
2002

- Danny Buderus

2005

- Andrew Johns

=== Provan-Summons Medal ===
1998

- Andrew Johns

1999

- Andrew Johns

2000

- Andrew Johns

2001

- Andrew Johns

2002

- Andrew Johns

=== Peter Frilingos Memorial Award ===
2005

- Andrew Johns

=== Bronze Dally M Player of the Year ===
1995

- Andrew Johns

== General awards ==
=== Clive Churchill Medal ===
1997

- Robbie O'Davis

2001

- Andrew Johns

=== Rothmans Medal ===
1989

- Mark Sargent

== State of Origin Awards ==
=== Man of the Match ===
1994

- Paul Harragon (Game 2)

1996

- Andrew Johns (Game 2)

2000

- Adam MacDougall (Game 1)

2002

- Andrew Johns (Game 1)

2003

- Andrew Johns (Game 2)

2005

- Andrew Johns (Game 2)

2022

- Kalyn Ponga (Game 3)

=== Brad Fittler Medal ===
2008

- Danny Buderus

2010

- Kurt Gidley

=== Ron McAuliffe Medal ===
1997

- Robbie O'Davis

== Honours ==
=== Immortal ===
- Andrew Johns (2012)

=== The ARL's 100 Greatest Players ===
No. 47

- Andrew Johns

No. 96

- Steve Walters
