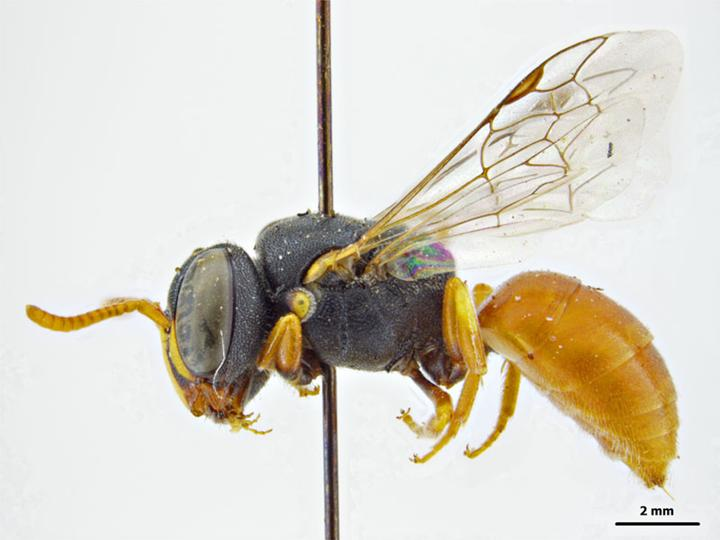
- Female

Scientific classification
- Kingdom: Animalia
- Phylum: Arthropoda
- Clade: Pancrustacea
- Class: Insecta
- Order: Hymenoptera
- Family: Colletidae
- Genus: Hylaeus
- Species: H. semirufus

Binomial name
- Hylaeus semirufus (Cockerell, 1914)

Synonyms
- Euryglossa semirufa Cockerell, 1914; Prosopis pulchricrus Cockerell, 1915

= Hylaeus semirufus =

Species of bee

Hylaeus semirufus, or Hylaeus (Hylaeteron) semirufus, is a species of bee in the family Colletidae and subfamily Hylaeinae. It is endemic to Australia. It was described by British-American entomologist Theodore Dru Alison Cockerell in 1914.

== Description ==
Female body length is about 5 mm. Integumental colouration is mainly black, with red and yellow markings, the female abdomen red.

== Distribution and habitat ==
The species occurs in inland Australia. The type locality is Brewarrina in north-western New South Wales.

== Behaviour ==
The adults are flying mellivores. Flowering plants visited by the bees include Cassia, Grevillea and Hakea species.

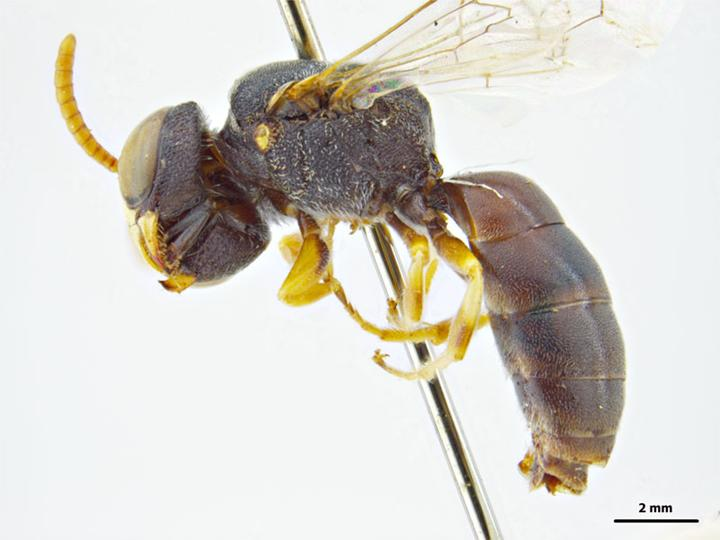
Male
