= Isaac Gordon =

Australian rugby league footballer

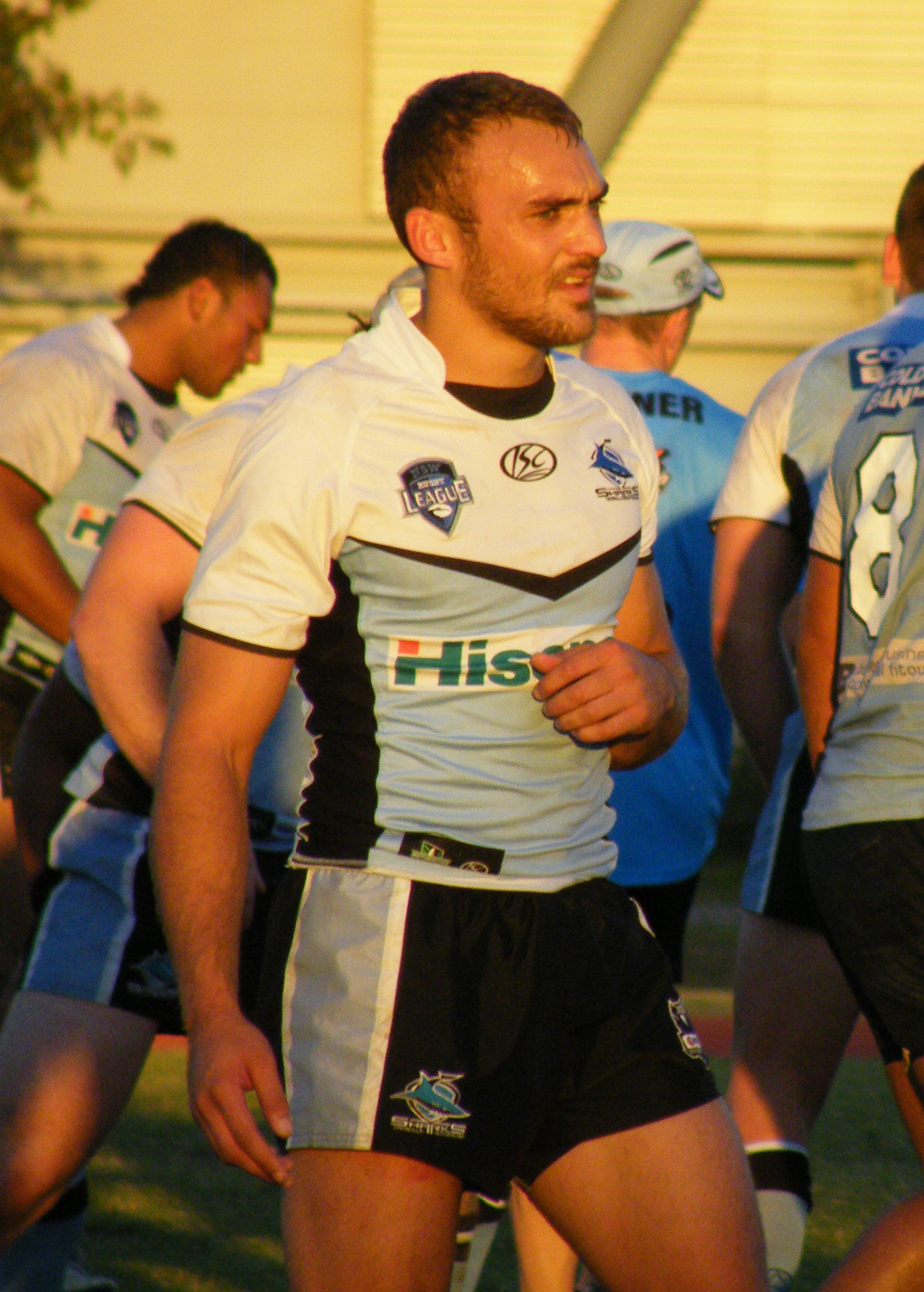
- Gordon playing for the Sharks in 2010.

Personal information
- Born: 7 October 1986 (age 40) Brewarrina, New South Wales, Australia

Playing information
- Height: 176 cm (5 ft 9 in)
- Weight: 84 kg (13 st 3 lb)
- Position: Fullback, Wing
Club
Years	Team	Pld	T	G	FG	P
2010–12	Cronulla-Sutherland	29	10	0	0	40
- Relatives: Ashley Gordon (cousin)

Isaac Gordon (born 7 October 1986) is a former Indigenous Australian professional rugby league footballer. He previously played for the Cronulla-Sutherland Sharks of the National Rugby League. He primarily played fullback and wing.

== Playing career ==
Born in Brewarrina, New South Wales, Gordon played his junior football for the Brewarrina Goo-Gars, Waratah Mayfield Cheetahs and Cessnock Goannas. Gordon played for The North Sydney Bears in The 2007 and 2008 NSW Cup making 14 appearances before being signed by the Cronulla-Sutherland Sharks.

In Round 1 of the 2010 NRL season Gordon made his NRL debut for Cronulla-Sutherland against the Melbourne Storm.

After the 2012 season, Gordon was released by Cronulla.

== Personal life ==
He is the second cousin of former Newcastle Knights player Ashley Gordon.

On 25 January 2012, Gordon pleaded guilty in Sutherland Court to attacking his former partner, Karen Lee Davidson who was pregnant at the time of the assault, after he came home from a drunken night out with teammates. The NRL stood him down for nine matches.
