= Barranbinya =

Aboriginal Australian people of New South Wales

The Barranbinya, also written Baranbinja and other variants, are an Aboriginal Australian people of New South Wales.

== Country ==
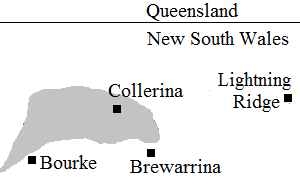
Map showing the traditional lands of the Baranbinya people

Barranbinya territory extended over an estimated 1,200 square miles (3,100 km^{2}) along the northern bank of the Darling River from Bourke to Brewarrina. (Note: 'Tribe above the junction of the Bogan to the native fishery at Breewarrina.' 'Next language down the Barwon south of the Weilwan speakers.' (Honery 1878, p. 246))

== Alternative names ==
- Barren-binya
- Barrumbinya, Burrumbinya, Barrunbarga (typo)
- Baranbinja
- Burranbinga, Burrabinya
- Burranbinya, Burrunbinya
- Parran-binye

Source: Tindale 1974, p. 191

== Sources ==
- Honery, Thomas (1878). Ridley, William (ed.). "Australian Languages and Traditions: Wailwun Language and Traditions". The Journal of the Anthropological Institute of Great Britain and Ireland. 7: 232–274. JSTOR 2841001.
- Mathews, R. H. (1903). "Murrawarri and other Australian languages" (PDF). Queensland Geographical Journal. 18: 52–68.
- Mathews, R. H. (1907). "Initiation ceremonies of Murawarri and other aboriginal tribes of Queensland" (PDF). Queensland Geographical Journal. 22: 64–73.
- Oates, Lynette F. (1 January 1985). Barranbinya: Fragments of a N.S.W. Aboriginal language. Pacific Linguistics. Series A. Occasional Papers. Australian National University. pp. 185–204.
- Pechey, W. A (1872). "Vocabulary of the Cornu Tribes of Australia". The Journal of the Anthropological Institute of Great Britain and Ireland. 1: 143–147. doi:10.2307/2840949. JSTOR 2840949.
- Tindale, Norman Barnett (1974). "Baranbinja (NSW)". Aboriginal Tribes of Australia: Their Terrain, Environmental Controls, Distribution, Limits, and Proper Names. Australian National University.
