= Hospital Creek Massacre =

Massacre in New South Wales, Australia

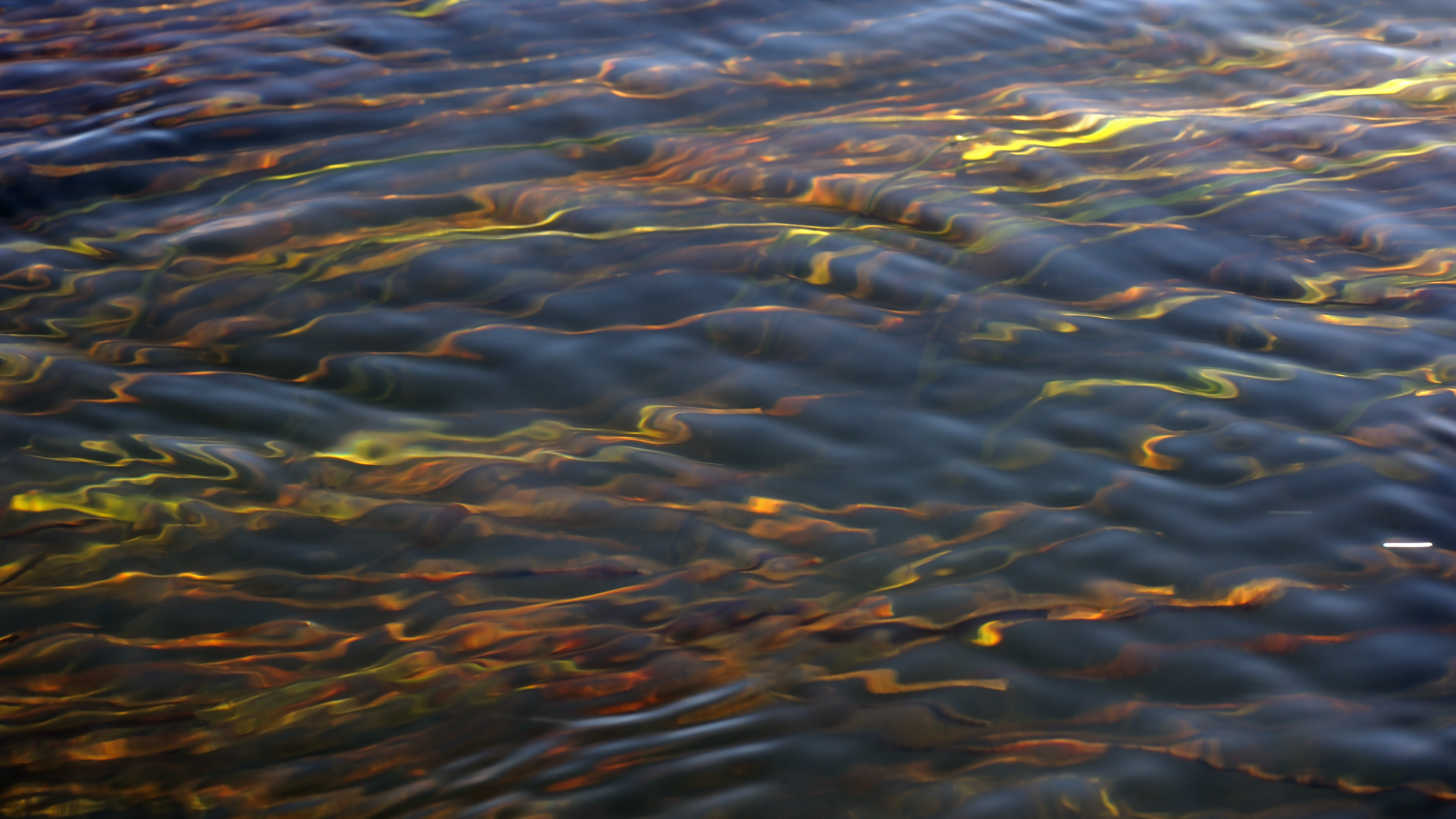
Hospital Creek, New South Wales

The Hospital Creek Massacre refers to a retaliatory mass-slaughter of Indigenous Australians in 1859 in rural New South Wales at Hospital Creek about 10km north-east of Brewarrina.

There are differing accounts of this event, but one alleges that a white stockman at Walcha Hut (now called Brewarrina), abducted an Aboriginal woman. The stockman was warned by the woman's fellow tribe members to release her. When the stockman refused to release the woman, they were both killed. White settlers retaliated by shooting a large number of Aboriginal men, women and children. Another version claims that the Hospital Creek Massacre was led by J. McKenzie and refers to the death of 300 Aboriginals in retaliation for having "annoyed" white settlers.

In 1928, The Sydney Mail published an article titled Pioneers of the West: The Massacre at Hospital Creek, written by G. M. Smith. This version names Cornelius "Con" Bride, the manager of the Quantambone cattle station, as the main organiser of the massacre. Bride claimed that many of his cattle were being speared near the waterholes by a large group of Aboriginal people from the Culgoa River. He attempted to persuade them to move on but they refused, so he went to an adjoining cattle station for assistance. They sent men and ammunition, and Con Bride led a force of 20 armed men, including at least six "black boys" from the cattle station, to disperse the Culgoa River Aboriginals. He claimed that only a "dozen or so" were shot, however it is possible that it was many more. He was quoted as saying

"Some went so far as to say that I should have been put on trial for what I did, but the Government was well aware of the fact that the work we were doing outback could not be done with white-gloves on, and, therefore, were not too ready to take action in such cases, but depended on the humanity of the white settlers to spare the natives as much as possible."

Bride described how the Aboriginal men were hiding in the trees at the waterholes and spearing the cattle when they came to drink. The name Hospital Creek is itself derived from massacre, alluding to the many Aboriginal people wounded and killed there.
