= Brewarrina Aboriginal Mission Site =

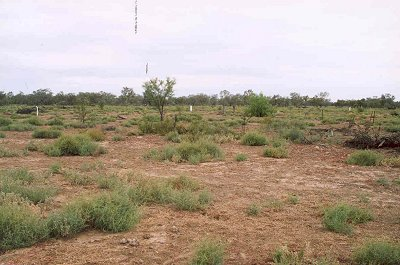
- Site of the mission

- Location within New South Wales Location within Australia
- 29.9805°S 146.9661°E
- Location: The Old Mission Road, Brewarrina, New South Wales, Australia

History
- Built: 1880–

New South Wales Heritage Register
- Official name: Brewarrina Aboriginal Mission Site; Barwon Mission; Brewarrina Mission; Brewarrina Aboriginal Station
- Type: state heritage (complex / group)
- Designated: 21 July 2006
- Reference no.: 1732
- Type: Occupational site
- Category: Aboriginal

Brewarrina Aboriginal Mission Site is a heritage-listed site of the former mission station for Aboriginal Australians and cemetery at The Old Mission Road, Brewarrina, New South Wales, Australia. It was also known as Barwon Mission, Brewarrina Mission and Brewarrina Aboriginal Station. It was added to the New South Wales State Heritage Register on 21 July 2006. This mission was the largest and longest-running mission or Aboriginal reserve in the state, and operated from 1886 to 1966.

== History ==
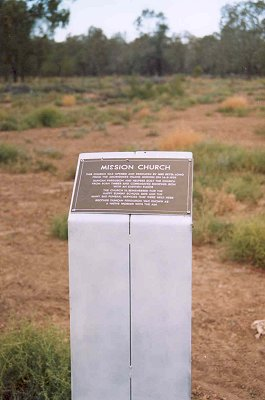
Plaque recording the location of the mission's church

For the first Protector of Aborigines and the Aboriginal Protection Board, the problem of the large group of Aboriginal people camping around Brewarrina seemed to be one of the most pressing in the State. In 1882 a census listed 151 Aboriginal people and 24 "half-castes" at Brewarrina, many reported to be suffering from venereal diseases and "addicted to the habits of intemperance". In 1885 the Aboriginal Protection Board removed the Aboriginal population to an Aboriginal reserve 2 mi (3.2 km) from town, but urged the need for a home for Aboriginal people in the area. In 1886 the Aborigines Protection Association established a mission on a reserve of 5,000 acres (2,000 ha), 10 miles (16 km) east of the town on the opposite bank of the Barwon River, at the Quantambone stock camp.

The new Mission did not attract all the Brewarrina people. In 1891 only 41 and in 1897 43 people were recorded as residents of the mission. In 1897 the Board took over the mission from the Protection Association as they were making small contributions to the enterprise of the mission. During the 1920s and 1930s many Aboriginal people were brought in from places such as Tibooburra, Angledool, Collarenebri and Walgett due to other stations were closed down. (Aboriginal Settlements)

Only a few families lived out on the reserve in 1882 and had their homes near the river bank. When Aboriginal people began to arrive or were relocated, the Aboriginal Protection Board built houses from corrugated iron with board or concrete flooring. When the Aboriginal people from Tibooburra were relocated to Brewarrina mission their houses were made of weatherboard and were located in two rows at the back of the mission, next to another two rows of houses for the Angledool people. The Mission Church was built by Duncan Ferguson from bush timber and corrugated roofing iron with an earthen floor. The church was used for Sunday school and funerals.

In the early period the Mission contained a Managers House, Butchers Shop, School, Church, small treatment-room and hall. The school never had proper teachers, and classes were taught by either the mission manager, mission managers wife, the clinic sister or even the bookkeeper. Mission schools only had to teach to the standard Grade three. The Education Department maintained a one-teacher school in 1965.

There was a girls' dormitory at the Brewarrina Mission. Once girls reached the age of 13 or 14 the Aboriginal Protection Board would remove the girls from their families to house them at the dormitory. Here they were taught how to become maids and then sent out to stations to work. The dormitory was established sometime before 1897.

The Mission had a number of Station Managers, and the Manager's house was referred to as the "Big House". On the arrival of a new Mission Manager, the families were allowed to make a garden to grow their own vegetables and fruit. These included turnips, onions, cabbages, tomatoes, cucumbers, strawberries, and carrots. Everyone was required to grow orange trees, lemon trees and mandarin trees, and some stone fruit trees: peaches, apricots, and plums. The last Mission Manager was William Hopkins who died in December 1900. His grave site is within the Brewarrina Mission Cemetery.

The Aboriginal people were required to wash in sheep dip. Every morning each child was required to go to the Clinic to get pink eye drops and cod liver oil. A small lump of hard soap was allocated once a month. Twice a week meat rations were supplied from the butchers shop, the first would consist of enough to feed a family chops, lump of fat or kidney with fat, piece of liver and half a neck. The other would consist of two lamb shanks and a kidney to feed for a week. On ration day once a fortnight a supply of vegetables such as potatoes, onions, sugar, tea leaves, rice, flour, salt, pepper, syrup, and half a bar of soap. If the Mission Manager felt that anyone was making trouble on the station, everyone in that family had their rations reduced. To obtain more food, many Aboriginal people would fish in the Barwon River and gather mussels.

Water was pumped up from the Barwon River and reticulated to the houses but only some of them had taps inside the dwellings. Most had outside coppers and tubs for washing and bathing and only two had bathrooms .

According to a death report for Lloyd James Boney written for the Royal Commission into Aboriginal Deaths in Custody (RCDIAC), "Brewarrina Mission became a focal point for the Board's enforced concentration of Aboriginal people in the 1910s. So many children were taken away from their parents that Aboriginals tried in turn to escape from the Board to surrounding stock camps, or to the town camp of Barwon Four". Also according to the RCDIAC report, the APA would take absconding indentured Aboriginal apprentices to the mission dormitories and mete out harsh punishment. However, the Aboriginal people living there often maintained their own community lives and culture, held political meetings, and used their own languages despite the ban on speaking them. In the 1930s, the APA undertook more forced removals of Aboriginal people from different groups, bringing them to the already overcrowded mission from as far away as 350 mi (560 km).

The reserve was reduced from 4,638 acres (1,877 ha) to 638 acres (258 ha) in 1953. The Welfare Board tried to move the mission residents into the town, with the aim of cultural assimilation, but no rental homes were available to Aboriginal people, and the council worked against integration. The Welfare Board then announced a small new reserve, comprising 30 cheap houses built on an exposed, treeless hill within half a mile of the town, which they called West Brewarrina, and in 1965 all of the mission residents were moved there. The residents dubbed their new home "Dodge City", reflecting their knowledge of racial segregation practised in the American cattle town of Dodge City, Kansas. Around this time the Welfare Board was dismantled.

Only a few acres of the remaining acreage of the mission were still used in 1965, for the station buildings and a small cemetery. In November 1965, just 11 small cottages and a school, a garage, a small treatment room, a hall, and the manager's house and office remained.

The last burial at the cemetery was in 1971.

== Description ==
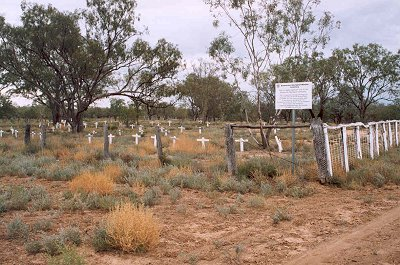
Mission cemetery

Today there are no buildings standing. The cemetery is located within a large pasture and is enclosed by a fence which is need of repair. There are approximately 90 graves with 50 of those being marked by wooden crosses and headstones. Near the cemetery there are 2 small burial sites which were recently done in a reburial ceremony of returned ancestral remains.

Over the old mission area, approximately 16 small interpretation panels are scattered, providing information as to what was once there. Remains of the rehabilitation centre are also on the site, including the concrete slab.

The community would like to further improve the condition of the cemetery as it is need of urgent repair. The community would also like to further enhance the interpretation signage to include a driving trail around the signs to enable better viewing. The rehabilitation centre, which is now demolished, needs to be cleaned up and possibly a new shed could be built on the existing concrete slab.

== Heritage listing ==
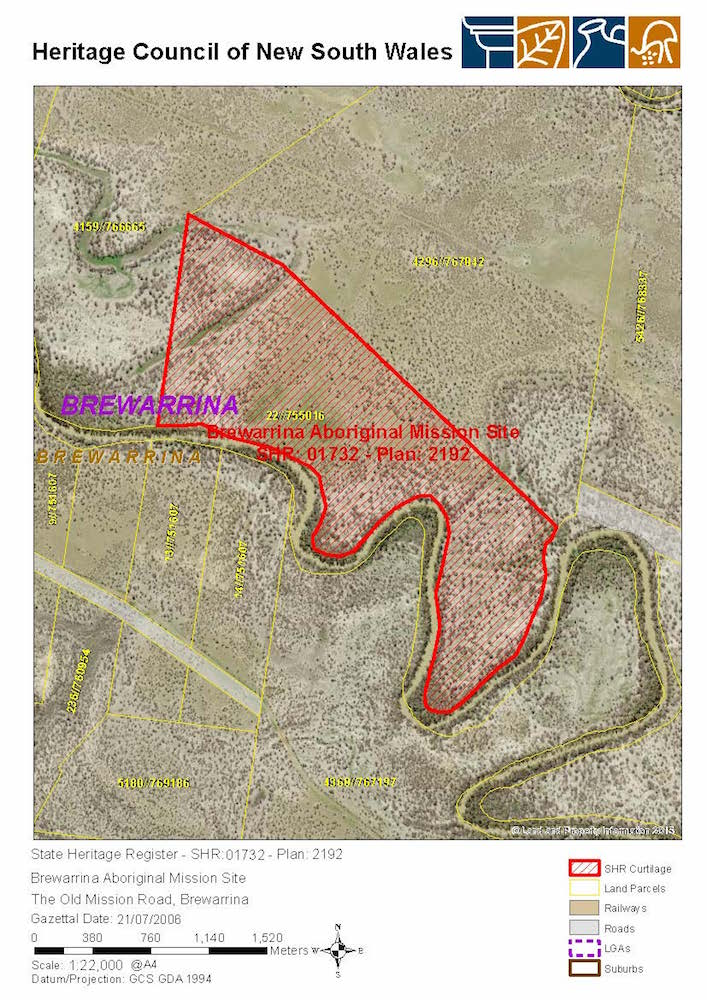
Heritage boundaries

The Brewarrina Aboriginal Mission was the oldest institutional-type community in the state that was still managed in 1965. Brewarrina Mission was the first institution formally established by the Aborigines Protection Board as part of its policy to segregate Aboriginal people. Over the years, the Brewarrina Mission was used to house other Aboriginal people from Tibooburra, Angledool, Goodooga and Culgoa to form the reserve which operated between 1886 - 1966 and was one of the longest running reserve stations in NSW. During the reserve period many Aboriginal people died and were buried in the reserve cemetery. The cemetery is no longer used by the community its integrity is held high within the values of the Aboriginal people. The entire site of Brewarrina Mission including its cemetery is a significant place to the many Aboriginal tribes including Ngemba and Murrawarri tribe as a "place of belonging". The place retains its high integrity in its cultural, spiritual, social and historical values to many Aboriginal people across NSW.

Brewarrina Aboriginal Mission Site was listed on the New South Wales State Heritage Register on 21 July 2006 having satisfied the following criteria.

The place is important in demonstrating the course, or pattern, of cultural or natural history in New South Wales.

The Brewarrina Mission is the oldest institutional type community in the state. It is associated with the significant historical phase as being the first institution formally established by the Aboriginal Protection Board in 1886. While there are no remaining buildings left, the original cemetery remains within the mission site which maintains the continuity of the historical activity of an Aboriginal settlement.

The place has a strong or special association with a person, or group of persons, of importance of cultural or natural history of New South Wales's history.

The site of the Brewarrina mission and the cemetery is evidence of the occupation of Aboriginal people. The station was the oldest institutional-type community in the State that was still managed as such in 1965. Established in 1886, Aboriginal people were relocated 10 miles east of the town on the opposite bank of the Barwon River. The mission is associated with the removal of many Aboriginal people from their "homes" from as far as Tibooburra, Angledool, Walgett, Goodooga and Collenanebri and relocating them to the Brewarrina Mission during the 1930s. The girls' dormitory was also significant as it was utilised by the Aboriginal Protection Board to house young girls who were forcibly removed from their families to be educated in domestic work and then sent out in NSW to work.

The place has strong or special association with a particular community or cultural group in New South Wales for social, cultural or spiritual reasons.

Brewarrina Mission has a strong and special association for many Aboriginal people for its historical, social and cultural values and is a place of belonging to those of the Ngemba and Murwarri tribes. While many Aboriginal people were removed from their traditional home lands and forcibly removed to the Mission, Brewarrina Mission remains an important part to the community's sense of place.

The place is important in demonstrating the principal characteristics of a class of cultural or natural places/environments in New South Wales.

Brewarrina Mission is highly significant to many Aboriginal people within NSW to their cultural heritage values. The area is able to demonstrate the principal characteristics of the many Aboriginal people who lived at the mission during 1889 - 1966. Being the site of the first Aboriginal Protection Board institutionalised community the area has the attributes to demonstrate the way of life and customs of those who lived and died on the Mission. Although there are no physical buildings remaining, the original cemetery is all that remains and it is maintained by members of the community.
