= Brewarrina =

- Town
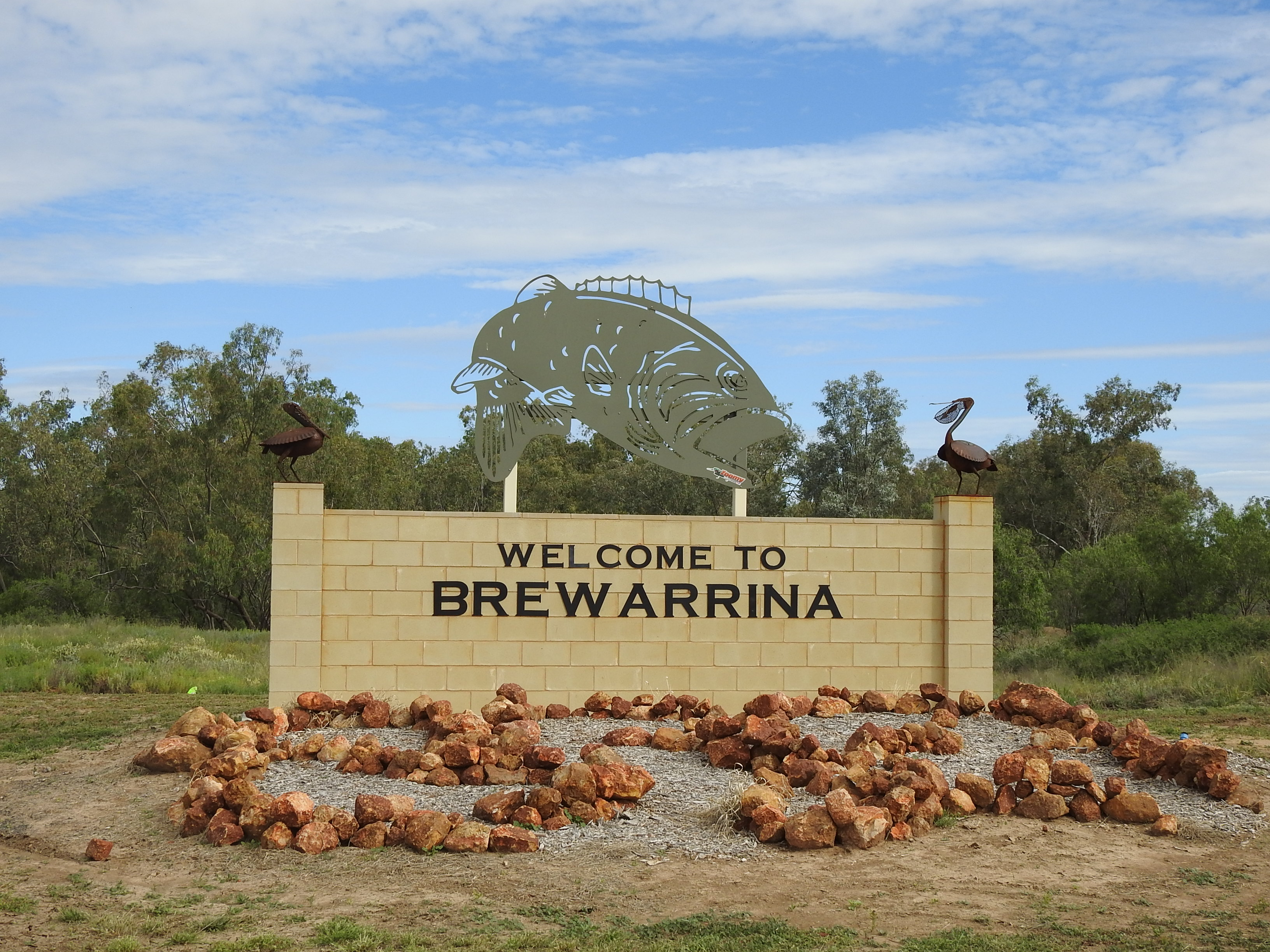
- Town sign from eastern approach (2021)

- Coordinates: 29°57′36″S 146°51′40″E
- Country: Australia
- State: New South Wales
- LGA: Brewarrina Shire
- Location: 787 km (489 mi) NW of Sydney; 378 km (235 mi) NW of Dubbo; 96 km (60 mi) E of Bourke
- Established: 1863

Government
  - State electorate: Barwon
  - Federal division: Parkes
- Elevation: 115 m (377 ft)

Population
  - Total: 743 (UCL 2021)
- Postcode: 2839
- Mean max temp: 27.6 °C (81.7 °F)
- Mean min temp: 12.7 °C (54.9 °F)
- Annual rainfall: 412.2 mm (16.23 in)

Brewarrina (pronounced bree‑warren‑ah; locally known as “Bre”) is a town in north‑west New South Wales, Australia, situated on the Barwon River within Brewarrina Shire. Located 96 km (60 miles) east of Bourke and 787 km (490 miles) north‑west of Sydney, it had a population of 743 at the 2021 census. The town serves as a regional centre for surrounding communities including Goodooga, Gongolgon, Weilmoringle and Angledool.

The area has a deep Indigenous history and is a significant cultural meeting place for the Ngemba, Murrawarri, Euahlayi, Weilwan and Barranbinya peoples. Brewarrina is best known for the Brewarrina Aboriginal Fish Traps (Baiame’s Ngunnhu), a complex system of stone weirs and ponds along the Barwon River that is among the oldest known human‑made structures in Australia. The nearby Brewarrina Aboriginal Mission, established in 1876, became a major site of government‑controlled settlement and forced relocation until its closure in 1967.

European settlement began in the 1840s with the establishment of pastoral runs, and Brewarrina developed as the uppermost navigable port on the Darling–Barwon river system. The town grew through the late nineteenth century with the arrival of riverboats, the construction of the Barwon Bridge in 1888, and the opening of the Brewarrina railway line in 1901. Brewarrina’s twentieth‑century history includes major flooding in 1974, the growth of Aboriginal community activism, and the 1987 Brewarrina riot following the death of Lloyd Boney in police custody.

Today Brewarrina retains its cultural significance, with several heritage‑listed sites including the fish traps and the former mission. The town hosts annual racing and rodeo events, supports a range of sporting clubs, and serves as a service hub for the wider region.

== History ==
=== Pre-colonisation ===
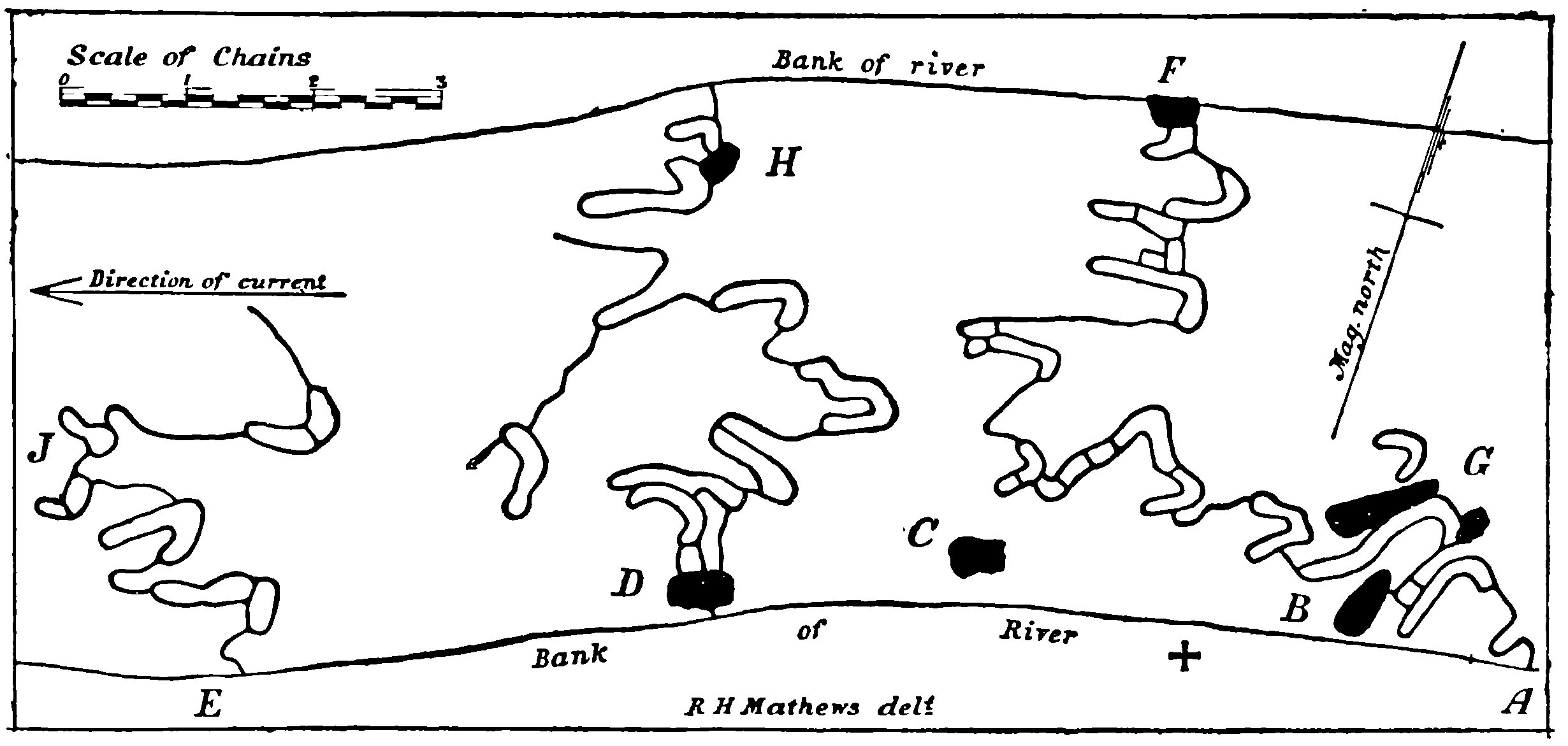
Plan of Baiame's Ngunnhu (Brewarrina Aboriginal Fish Traps)

The town is located amid the traditional lands of the Ngemba, Murrawarri, Euahlayi (Yuwaalaraay), Weilwan, and Barranbinya peoples, who have lived on the land for at least 2000 generations. The area has a long Indigenous Australian history and was once a great gathering site for Indigenous people.

The Ngunnhu (Brewarrina Aboriginal Fish Traps) are estimated to be over 40,000 years old.

The name Brewarrina is derived from burru waranha, a Weilwan Weilwan name for a species of acacia, Cassia tree, "Acacia clumps", "a native standing", or "place where wild gooseberry grows".

=== 19th century ===
The first British colonists arrived in the district in the early 1840s, with the brothers William and Nelson Lawson (sons of Lieutenant William Lawson) establishing two holdings – one called Walcha and another called Mohanna. Henry Cox (son of William Cox) formed Quantambone, while George Joseph Druitt (son of Major George Druitt) established Brewareena West. These pastoralists were the colonial elite with extensive other landholdings and employed managers to run their properties. For instance, William Lewis and then Cornelius "Con" Bride were the first managers for Quantambone.

In 1859, possibly up to 300 or 400 Aboriginal people were massacred by white settlers in an event known as the Hospital Creek Massacre, recollections of which vary. A memorial was erected by the local Aboriginal Land Council near the site of the massacre.

The town was first known as "Walcha Hut" but this later changed to "Brewarrina".

In 1859 a riverboat called Gemini, skippered by William Randell, reached the town. This opened the possibility of developing the town as a port, and by the early 1860s Brewarrina was recognised as the furthest navigable point on the Darling River. Brewarrina became a port for shipping wool to Adelaide via the Darling and Murray rivers. The town was formally surveyed and laid out in 1861 and proclaimed on 28 April 1863.

The paddle steamer Wandering Jew of 66 tonnes, 22 × 4.4 × 1.5 metres (72¼ x 14½ x 5 feet), was built in 1866 and registered at Sydney. On 15 December 1914, Wandering Jew was lost due to a fire on Barwon River, Brewarrina. "The Wandering Jew represents an earlier maritime era and provides a direct link to the riverine heritage of Brewarrina. Its colourful history and repeated damage by fire is evocative of the dramas associated with riverboat travel".

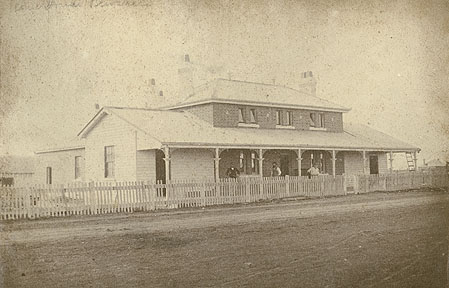
Brewarrina Court House

The 1870s were a boom time for Brewarrina. The courthouse was built in 1871. The Telegraph reached town in 1873. The Mechanics Institute formed in 1873. The following year two hotels, two stores and the Commercial Bank all opened, and in 1875 The Parish of Brewarrina was formed and public school was opened. All this development was largely due to Cobb and Co, which had a number of coach services passing through the town. There was a service from Byrock, one from Dubbo via Warren and, in 1874, a direct service from Brewarrina to Enngonia, north of Bourke.

The Barwon Bridge opened in 1888, the previous method of crossing the Barwon River was by punt and pontoon. The impetus for Brewarrina bridge, was to capture the New South Wales wool trade from the river paddle steamers and direct it away from Melbourne and Adelaide to Sydney. It is a rare bridge because it, and the lift bridge at North Bourke, are the only surviving examples of the first series of lift bridges in New South Wales. The bridge has been assessed as being of state significance and is listed on the NSW State Heritage Register.

In 1901 the Brewarrina railway line opened to Brewarrina from Byrock, on the Nyngan to Bourke line. The Brewarrina Line closed in 1974, and the wood-framed Brewarrina Station burned to the ground in 1980. The local telephone exchange was established in 1913. The town was surveyed in 1920. Brewarrina was used as a location for the Australian silent film Moora Neya, or The Message of the Spear (1911).

=== 20th century ===
In the 1970s, Essie Coffey, Tombo Winters (Thomas "Tombo" Martin Winters, c. 1938–2004), and Steve Gordon co-founded the Brewarrina Aboriginal Movement (which, among other things, successfully campaigned for integration of the open-air cinema in Brewarrina). They also co-founded the Western Aboriginal Legal Service (WALS) in the 1970s.

In January 1974, major floods hit the region, affecting Bourke, Walgett, and Brewarrina. The river was up 31 ft (9.4 m) at Brewarrina by 19 January, and was expected to peak at 35 ft (11 m) by the 25th. There were food shortages, and flooding made it impossible to bring machinery in to help build defences. Coffey, Winters, Gordon, and Phil Eyre were called upon by the local government and State Emergency Service (SES) to mobilise the Aboriginal community to build levees. When Winters realised that the levee would not protect West Brewarrina ("Dodge City"), where most of the Aboriginal people lived, from flooding, he tried to get boats to ferry people from Dodge City to the town. Gordon, co-founder of and now a field officer with WALS, said that civil defence officers had refused to make boats available for the Aboriginal community, providing only one 8-foot (2.4 m) aluminium rowing boat to service the whole community. The SES denied discrimination on racial grounds, saying that two boats had been flown in, but the first priority use was to link the town with its railway station and airport. A third boat coming in on 22 January would service the Aboriginal settlements for two hours each morning and afternoon. After the SES would not guarantee boats for the Dodge residents, Winters pulled the Aboriginal workers off the levee. On 23 January Gordon contacted the newly-established Chinese embassy in Canberra, which led to a national media response. According to Winters, as soon as reporters arrived, many boats started appearing at Dodge City, but they left after the media left.

On 15 August 1987 Brewarrina erupted into a riot, later known as the Brewarrina riot, triggered by the death in police custody of Lloyd James Boney. This came a few days after the announcement by Prime Minister Bob Hawke of a Royal Commission into Aboriginal Deaths in Custody, on 10 August 1987. Both the riot and the five-year trials that followed were widely covered by the press, and had continuing legal impact for years afterwards.

Yetta Dhinnakkal Centre, a minimum-security outdoor prison for young Indigenous men that ran an award-winning program, opened in 2000 and closed in 2020. Although often referred to as Brewarrina jail or prison, it was situated about 65 km (40 mi) south at Gongolgon.

== Heritage listings ==
Brewarrina has a number of heritage-listed sites, including:

- Brewarrina Aboriginal Fish Traps
- The Old Mission Road: Brewarrina Aboriginal Mission Site

=== Ancient Aboriginal fish traps ===
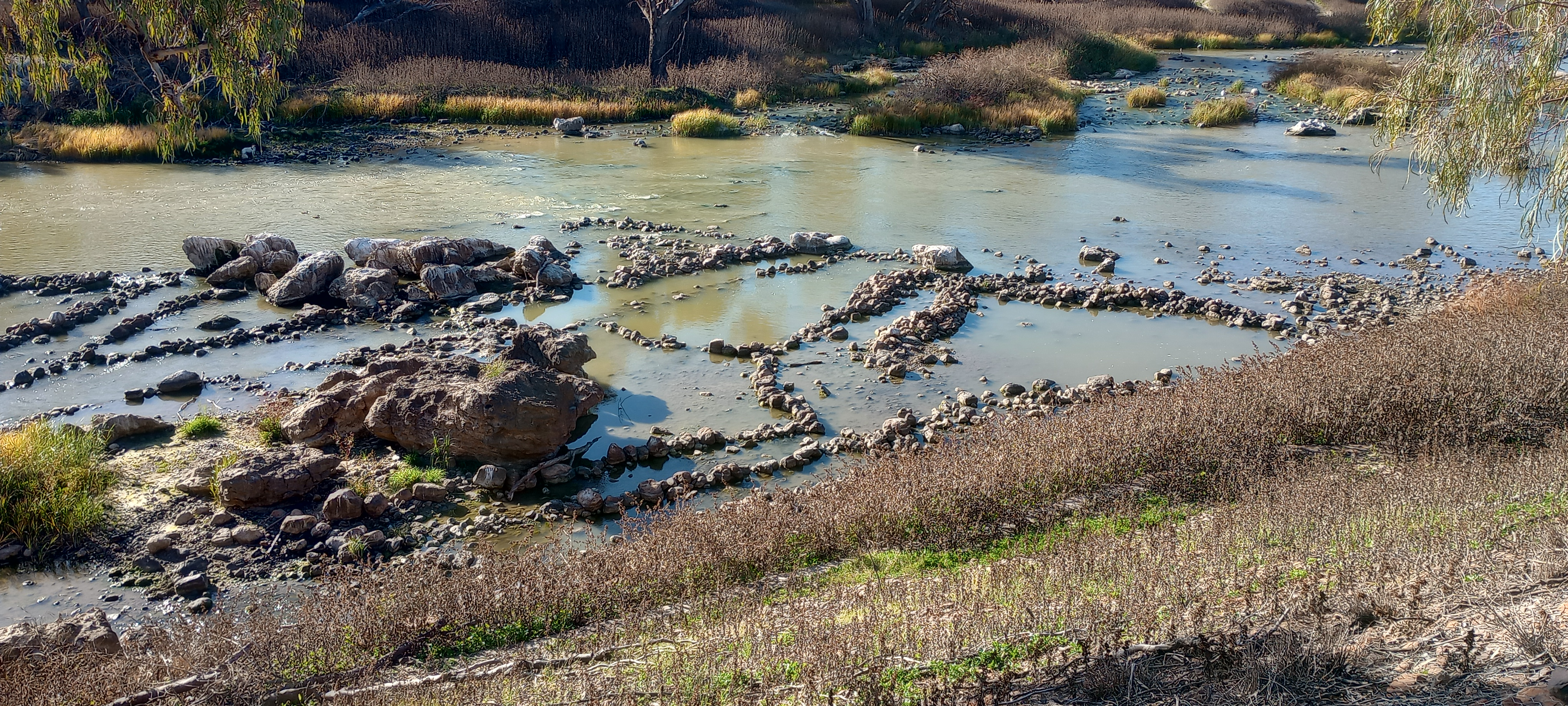
Brewarrina fish traps in 2023

Brewarrina's most significant feature is its Aboriginal fish traps. Known in the local Aboriginal language as Baiame's Ngunnhu. It is believed that Ngemba, Wonkamurra, Wailwan and Gomolaroi people have shared and maintained the traps for thousands of years. The age of the fish traps is currently unknown, but they may be the oldest human construction in the world. Locals claim that the traps are at least 40,000 years old and thus the oldest surviving human-made structure in the world.

Consisting of river stones arranged to form small channels, the traps direct fish into small areas from which they are readily plucked. The traps form a complex net of linked weirs and ponds along 500m of the river. They operate at varying water heights and can be altered to suit seasonal changes. People use their expert knowledge of fish species and the environment to maximise their catch. Brewarrina Ngemba Billabong has been declared a World Conservation Union (IUCN) Category V and VI protected area. It was declared an Indigenous Protected Area in November 2010. The ready availability of fish made Brewarrina one of the great intertribal meeting places of pre-European eastern Australia.

=== Brewarrina Aboriginal Mission ===
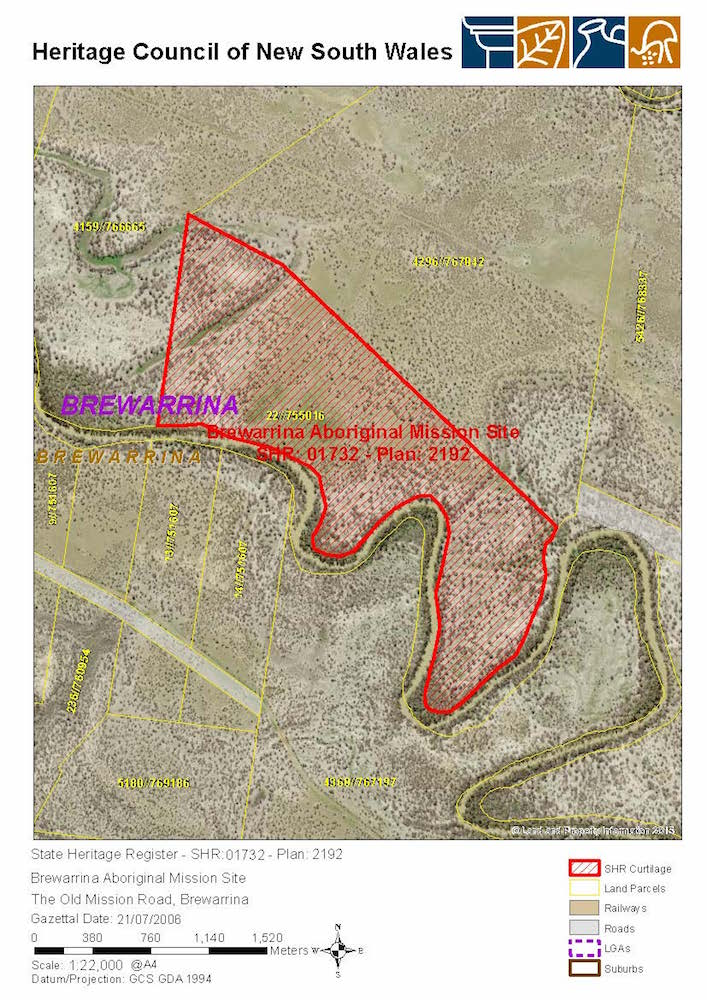
Brewarrina Aboriginal Mission site

The Brewarrina Ngemba Billabong has a strong cultural history. From 1876 to 1967 the Ngemba Billabong was the Brewarrina Aboriginal Mission for local Aboriginal people, whose land had been taken for grazing. The entire 261-hectare (640-acre) property is listed on the NSW State Heritage Register. Brewarrina Mission was the first institution formally established by the Aborigines Protection Board (APA) as part of its policy to segregate Aboriginal people.

According to a report written for the Royal Commission into Aboriginal Deaths in Custody (RCDIAC), "Brewarrina Mission became a focal point for the Board's enforced concentration of Aboriginal people in the 1910s". The Aboriginal people living on the mission often maintained their own community lives and culture, held political meetings, and used their own languages despite the ban on speaking them. In the 1930s, the APA undertook more forced removals of Aboriginal people from different groups, bringing them to the already overcrowded mission from as far away as 350 mi (560 km).

The reserve was reduced from 4,638 acres (1,877 ha) to 638 acres (258 ha) in 1953.

==== West Brewarrina ("Dodge City") ====
The Welfare Board tried to move the mission residents into the town, with the aim of cultural assimilation, but no rental homes were available to Aboriginal people, and the council worked against integration. The Welfare Board then announced a small new reserve, comprising 30 cheap houses built on an exposed, treeless hill within half a mile of the town, which they called West Brewarrina, and in 1965 all of the mission residents were moved there. The residents dubbed their new home "Dodge City", reflecting their knowledge of racial segregation practised in the American cattle town of Dodge City, Kansas. Around this time the Welfare Board was dismantled.

Several Aboriginal activists lived in West Brewarrina and/or worked to improve conditions there. Steve Gordon (born c.1948) worked to improve conditions for Aboriginal people living in West Brewarrina and against barriers to employment in the town. He was fired from his job at the meatworks after protesting about Aboriginal workers not being paid award wages. In 1973 he was appointed field officer for the Foundation for Aboriginal Affairs, headquartered in Sydney. Essie Coffey (1941–1998) was a community worker, singer, actor, and filmmaker, known for her film My Survival as an Aboriginal (1979), filmed in Brewarrina. Coffey, Gordon, and Tombo Winters (Thomas "Tombo" Martin Winters, c. 1938–2004) co-founded the Brewarrina Aboriginal Movement and the Western Aboriginal Legal Service.

== Description and governance ==
Brewarrina is situated on the banks of the Barwon River, in the local government area of Brewarrina Shire. It is 96 kilometres (60 mi) east of Bourke and west of Walgett on the Kamilaroi Highway, and 787 km (489 mi) from Sydney.

The town is known locally as "Bre". The population of Brewarrina in 2021 was 743.

Other towns and villages in the Brewarrina district include: Goodooga, Gongolgon, Weilmoringle, and Angledool.

== Climate ==
Brewarrina has the typical hot semi-arid climate (Köppen: BSh) of north-western New South Wales, with very hot summers frequently over 40 °C (104 °F), cool to mild winters and generally dry all year round. Brewarrina's highest recorded temperature was 48.9 °C (120.0 °F) on 19 December 1912, while its lowest was −4.1 °C (24.6 °F) on 14 July 1997. The average annual rainfall is 412.2 mm (16.2 in).

Climate data for Brewarrina Hospital (29º58'S 146º53'E, 115 m AMSL) (1991–2020, extremes 1911–2024)
Month	Jan	Feb	Mar	Apr	May	Jun	Jul	Aug	Sep	Oct	Nov	Dec	Year
Record high °C (°F)	48.3 (118.9)	47.2 (117.0)	43.9 (111.0)	38.3 (100.9)	35.0 (95.0)	29.4 (84.9)	31.2 (88.2)	35.6 (96.1)	39.0 (102.2)	43.9 (111.0)	46.0 (114.8)	48.9 (120.0)	48.9 (120.0)
Mean daily maximum °C (°F)	36.3 (97.3)	34.9 (94.8)	32.1 (89.8)	27.8 (82.0)	22.6 (72.7)	19.0 (66.2)	18.7 (65.7)	21.1 (70.0)	25.4 (77.7)	29.4 (84.9)	32.3 (90.1)	34.7 (94.5)	27.9 (82.1)
Mean daily minimum °C (°F)	21.9 (71.4)	21.1 (70.0)	18.0 (64.4)	13.3 (55.9)	8.9 (48.0)	6.3 (43.3)	4.7 (40.5)	5.4 (41.7)	9.2 (48.6)	13.4 (56.1)	17.1 (62.8)	19.6 (67.3)	13.2 (55.8)
Record low °C (°F)	10.4 (50.7)	9.5 (49.1)	7.0 (44.6)	1.4 (34.5)	−0.8 (30.6)	−2.8 (27.0)	−4.2 (24.4)	−2.1 (28.2)	−0.1 (31.8)	3.9 (39.0)	5.4 (41.7)	9.0 (48.2)	−4.2 (24.4)
Average precipitation mm (inches)	41.9 (1.65)	38.5 (1.52)	41.4 (1.63)	27.3 (1.07)	30.8 (1.21)	31.1 (1.22)	22.7 (0.89)	16.4 (0.65)	23.3 (0.92)	27.1 (1.07)	43.7 (1.72)	50.0 (1.97)	394.2 (15.52)
Average precipitation days (≥ 1.0 mm)	4.3	3.8	3.4	2.2	2.8	3.5	3.2	2.3	3.1	3.7	4.6	4.0	40.9
Average afternoon relative humidity (%)	31	35	32	33	42	50	45	35	30	26	29	27	35
Average dew point °C (°F)	12.2 (54.0)	13.4 (56.1)	10.7 (51.3)	7.8 (46.0)	7.2 (45.0)	6.6 (43.9)	4.5 (40.1)	2.9 (37.2)	3.4 (38.1)	4.4 (39.9)	7.8 (46.0)	8.8 (47.8)	7.5 (45.4)
Source: Bureau of Meteorology

=== Weather radar station ===
The Brewarrina radar station (29.96°S 146.81°E) at the local airport was constructed from July 2020 to provide better weather forecasts for the area and farming community.

== Sport and recreation ==
The townspeople of Brewarrina play a variety of sports. The town has a local rugby union club and team, the Brewarrina Brumbies, and a number of rugby league teams. Local players Alby Carr, Ron Gibbs, Les Biles, Isaac Gordon and cousin Ashley Gordon played first grade in the National Rugby League. Netball is played weekly, with over 12 teams playing in the local competition. The Brewarrina Golf Club is renowned throughout the western region as one of the best 'oiled' green golf courses. Other major sports include lawn bowls, shooting, tennis and swimming. The river is also used for swimming and water skiing in the summer months. A skate park is near the town centre.

The Brewarrina Circus Skills Training Project is a 2004 program, which trains local kids skills in circus acts and gives them the opportunity to travel across the country to places like Adelaide and Melbourne. The Brewarrina Youth Circus was a partnership with the Brewarrina Council and Brewarrina Central School with objectives to increase school attendance. This program has also given particular kids the chance to travel overseas, with one girl travelling to South Africa to perform in the art of circus skills.

== Events ==
Brewarrina plays host to one of the rodeos in the far west of New South Wales. The Brewarrina Show and Rodeo Society runs an annual rodeo program which attracts a large crowd to town. Unfortunately over the last number of years, the Brewarrina Show has not been held.

The Brewarrina Races are an important race meet in the district hosted by the Brewarrina Jockey Club. The race meet is usually held in May and has a large prize pool, complete with an extensive race program, fashions on the field, as well as other novelty races and lucky door prizes.

In more recent years, Brewarrina has played host to the Brewarrina Field Day, which came about as an event for people from the district to have a day out in the time after devastating drought. It showcases over 70 stalls, wildlife and agricultural exhibits, quick shear competitions, carnival rides, dog jumping trials, as well as food and bar stalls.

The Bre Big Fish is an annual fishing competition run over the June public holiday long weekend. It is hosted by the Brewarrina Fishing Club and draws many fishing, hunting and camping enthusiasts to the district.

In bygone years, Brewarrina was renowned for its annual "Festival of the Fisheries", which celebrated Brewarrina's Aboriginal and European History. Brewarrina also hosted the unique "Surfboat Classic", which attracted a number of Surf Life Saving Clubs from the New South Wales Coast. These events have not been held in recent years.

In April 2013, Brewarrina celebrated the 150th year since it was gazetted as a town in 1863. This was celebrated by a week long festival which included: Brewarrina Race Club meeting with over 2000 attendees, Bre Big Fish Competition, street parade and carnival, film festival, historical exhibitions, black tie ball, fireworks display, flower and cake show, as well as a number of celebratory sporting fixtures including rugby league and rugby union exhibition matches, clay target shooting and bowling competition.

== Notable people ==
- Jimmie Barker, first Indigenous published author. The two worlds of Jimmie Barker: The life of an Australian Aboriginal, 1900–1972 / as told to Janet Mathews.
- Mervyn Bishop (1945–), news and documentary photographer. Mervyn won 'News photographer of the Year Award' for Life and Death Dash, the 1971 front page of The Sydney Morning Herald.
- Essie Coffey (1941–1998), community worker, singer, actor, filmmaker, co-founder of the Western Aboriginal Legal Service
- Ron Gibbs (1962–), 1980s/1990s Australian rugby league footballer
- Ashley Gordon, 1990s Australian rugby league footballer
- Isaac Gordon (1986–), 2010s Australian rugby league footballer
- Leo Schofield (1935–), restaurant critic, advertising professional and arts festival director
- Albert George Henry Why (1899–1969), known as Alby Carr, an Australian rugby league footballer

== Education ==
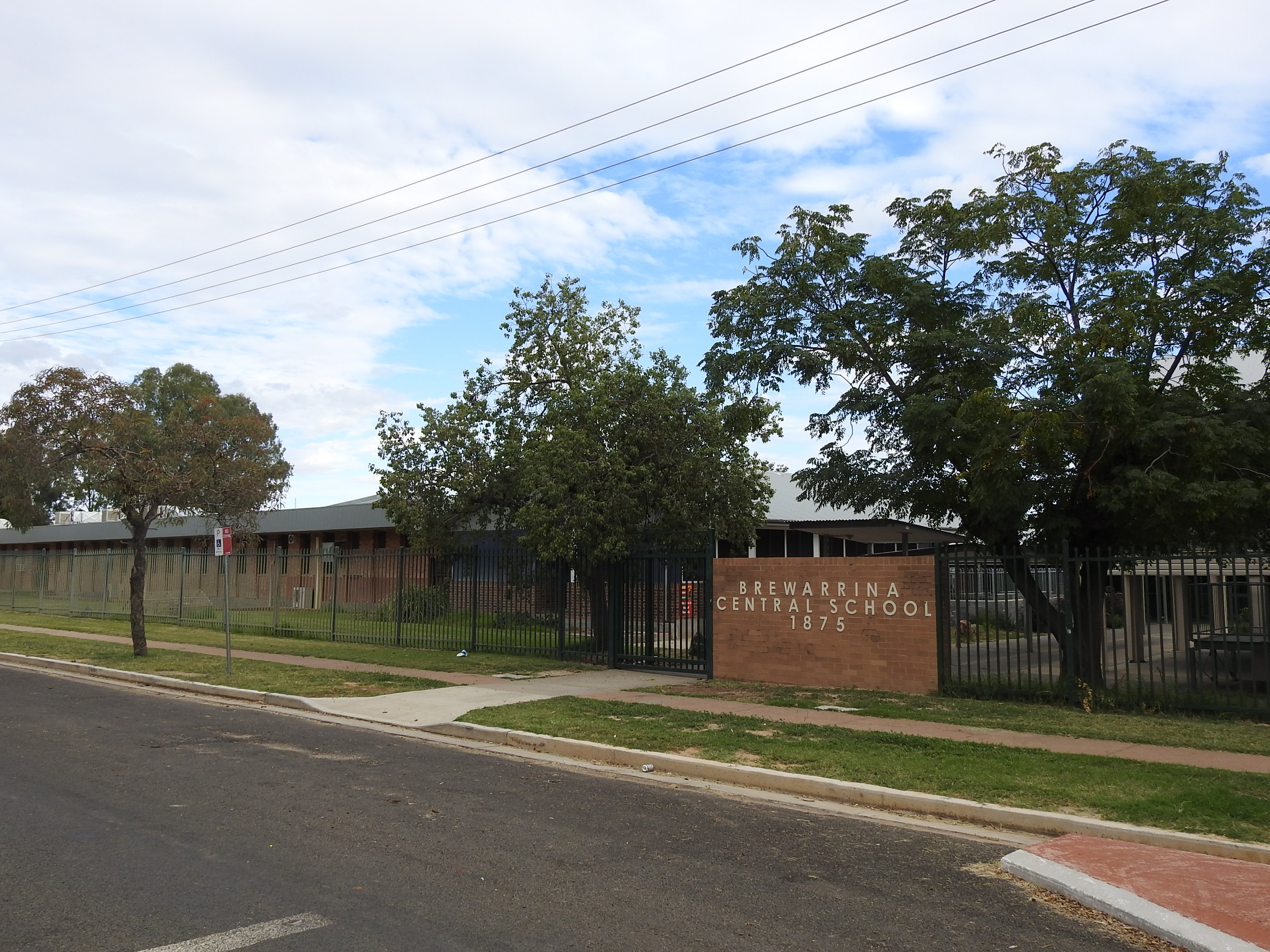
Brewarrina Central School (2021)

- Gainmara Birrilee Preschool
- Brewarrina Central School (Kindergarten to Grade 12)
- St Patrick's Catholic School (Kindergarten to Grade 6)
- TAFE Western, Brewarrina College

== Gallery ==
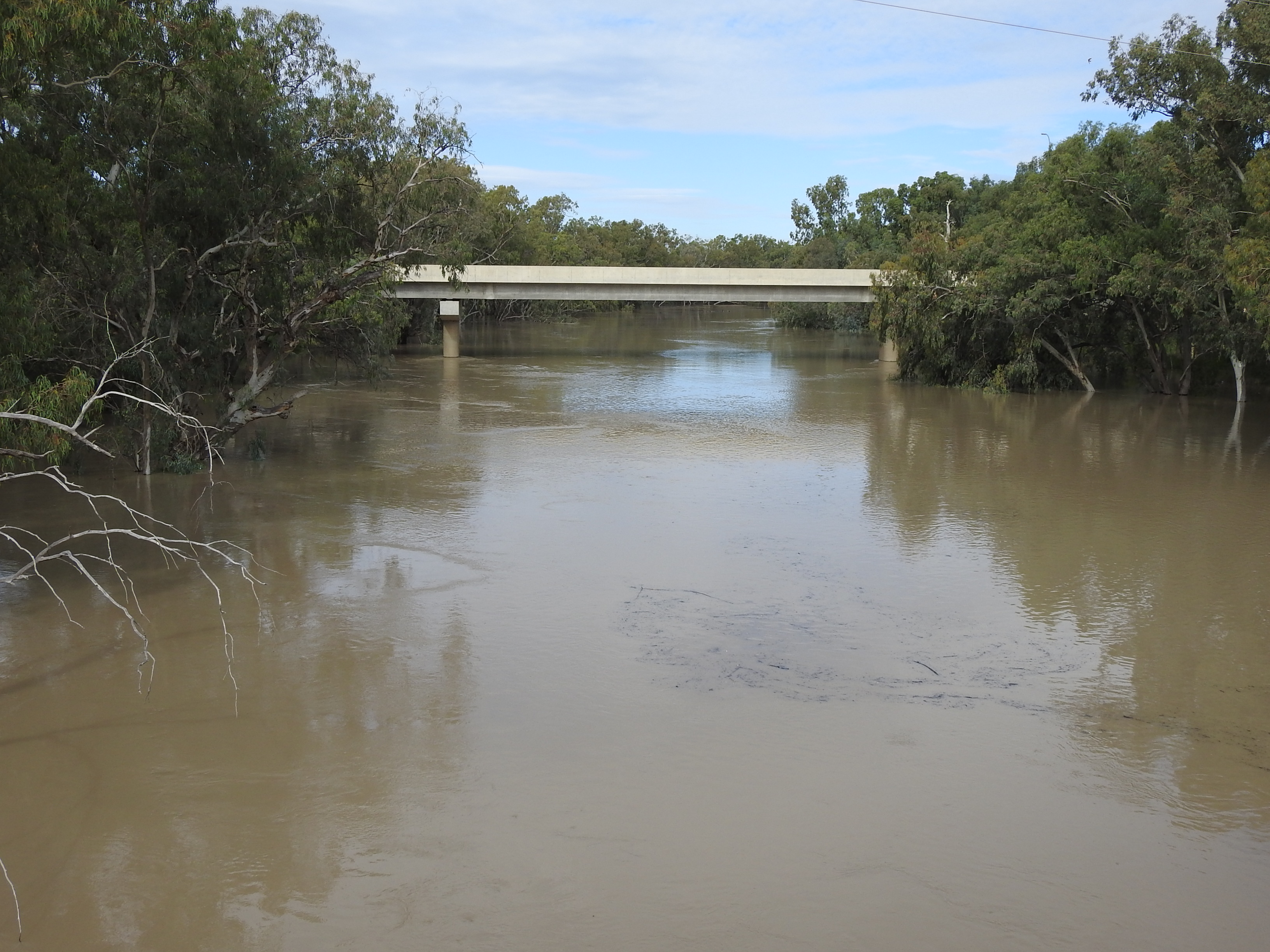
Bridge over the Barwon River in flood (2021)

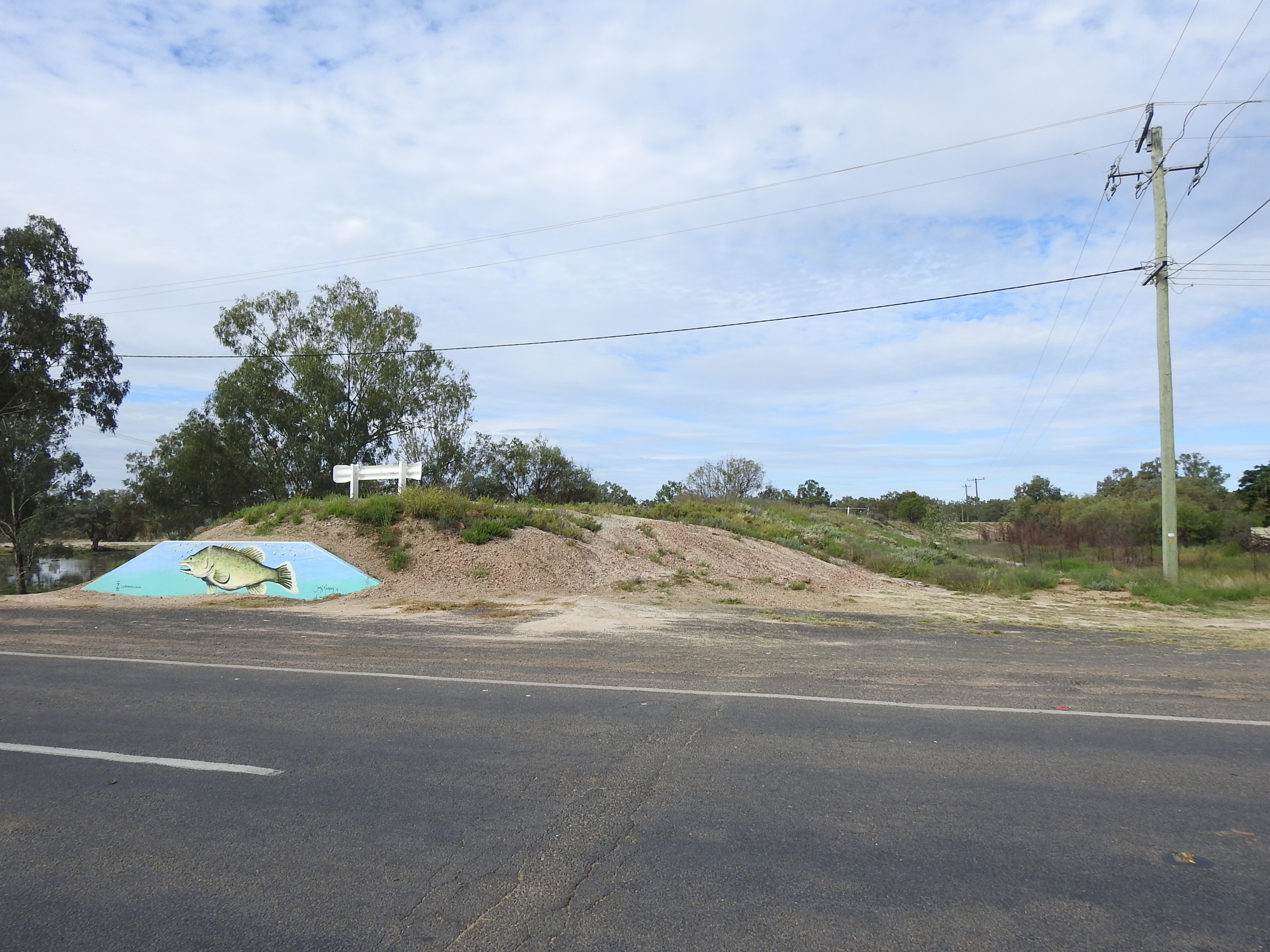
Eastern levee bank (2021)

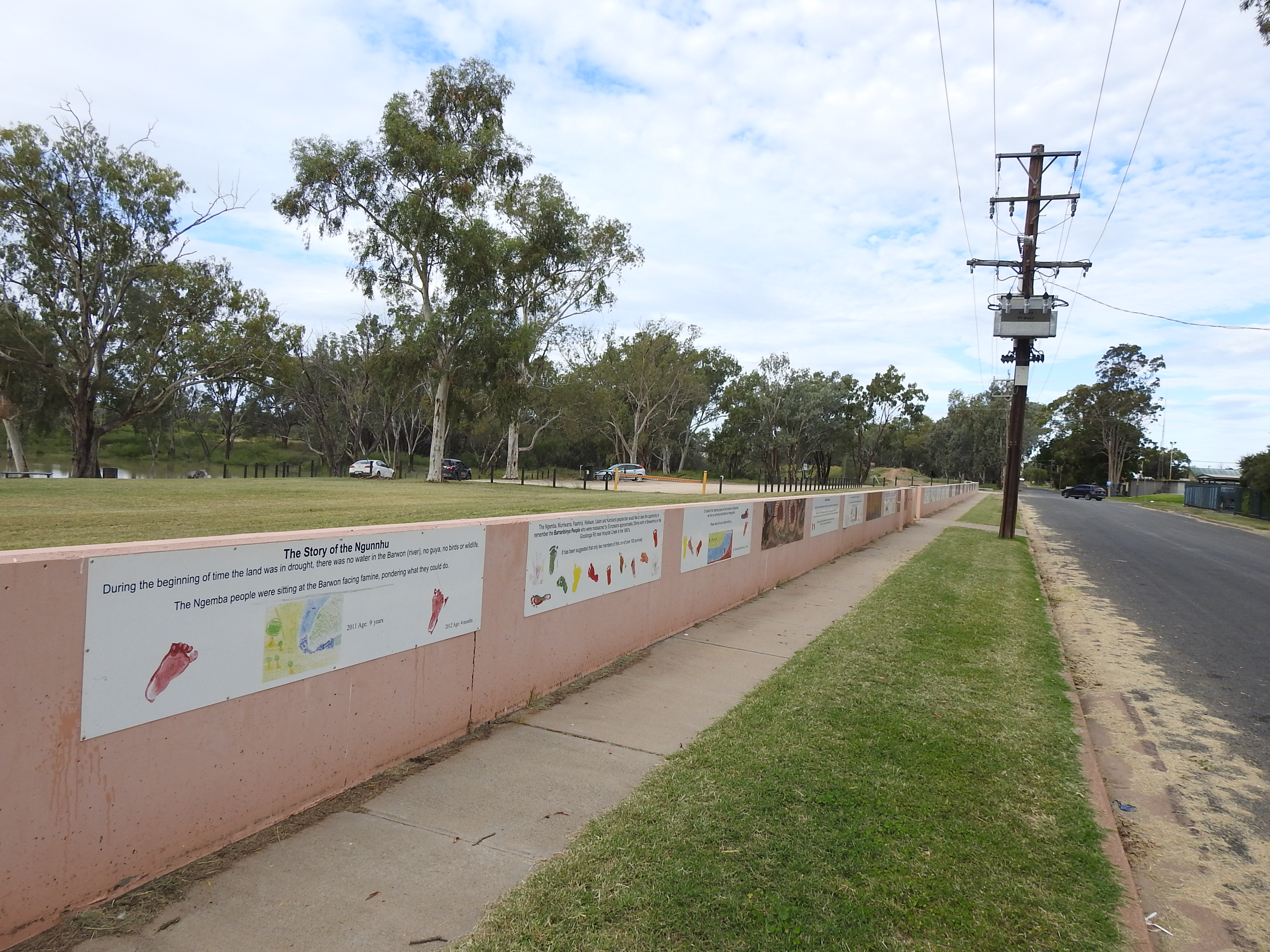
Levee wall beside Barwon River (2021)

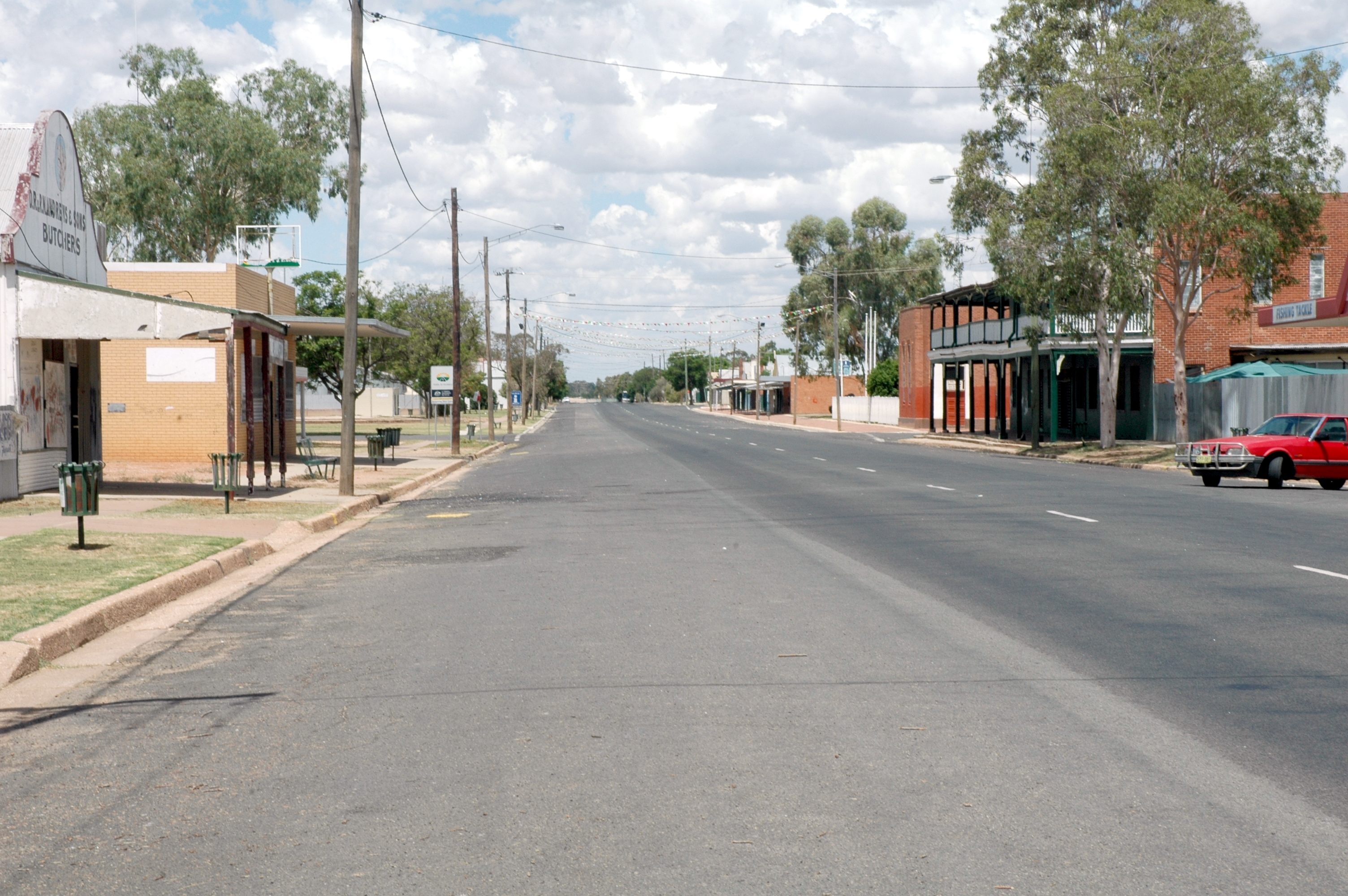
Bathurst Street main street, Hotel Brewarrina on the right (2008)

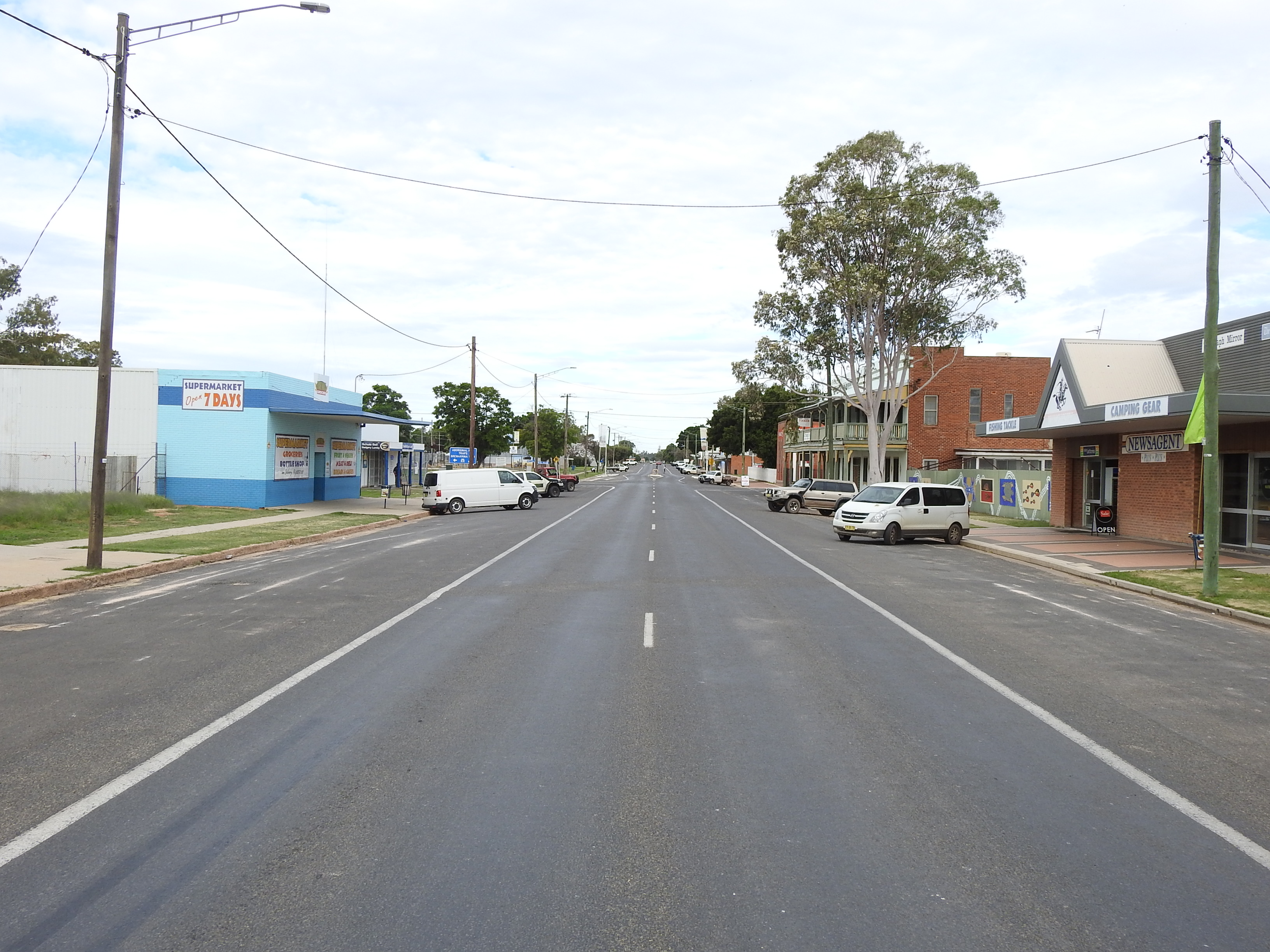
Bathurst Street, looking south-west (2021)

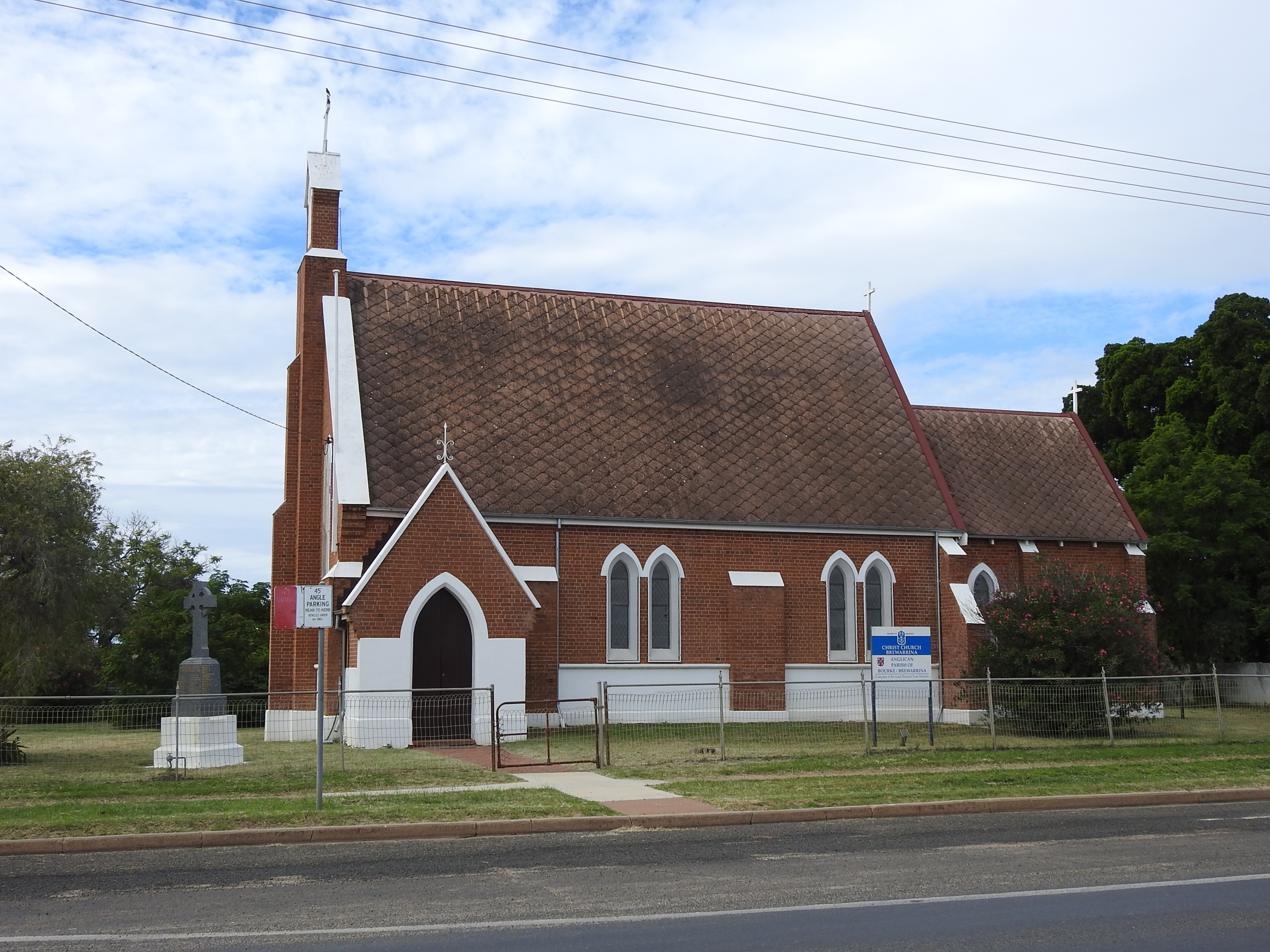
Anglican Christ Church, Young Street (2021)

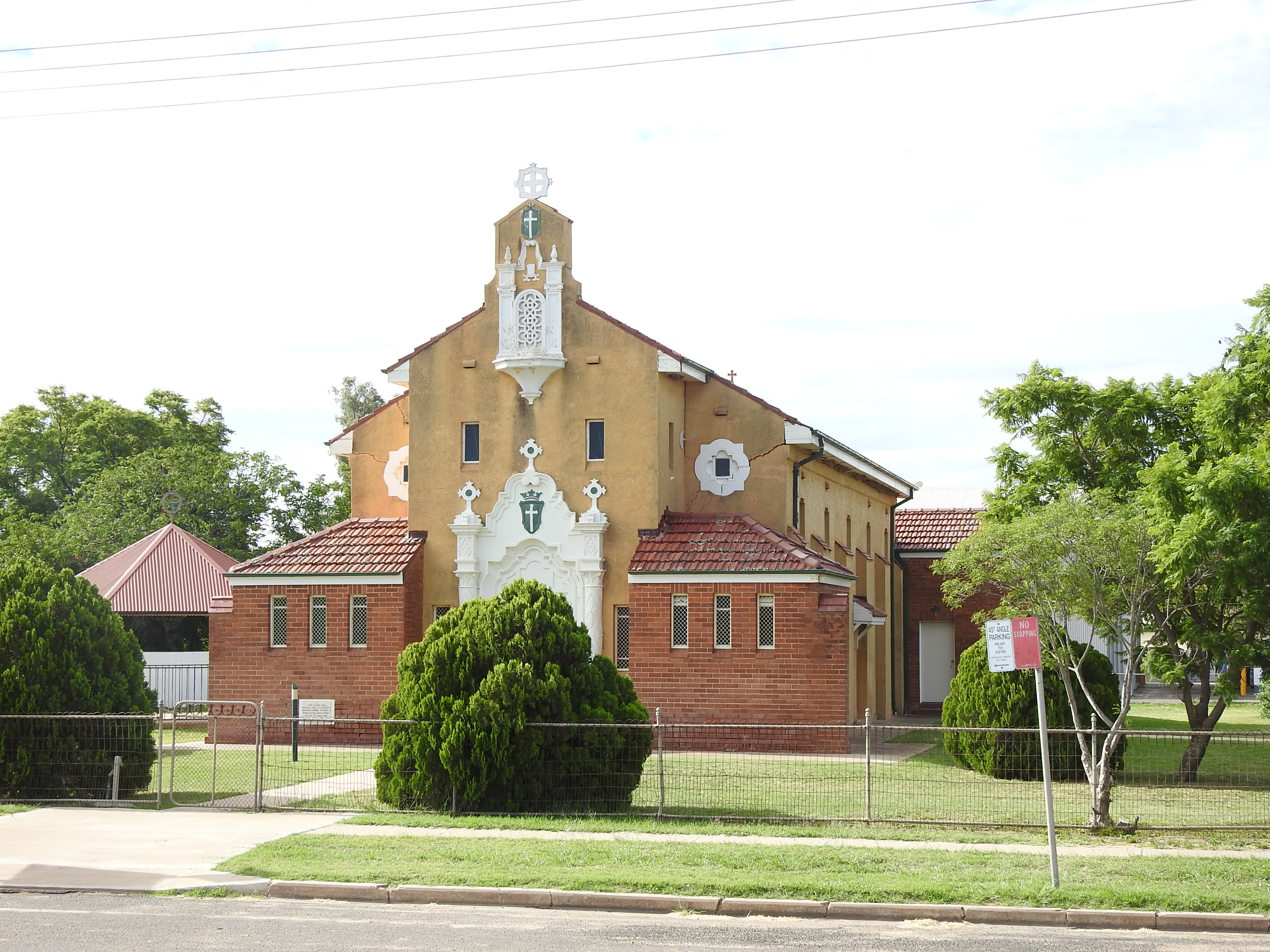
Saint Patrick's Catholic Church (2021)

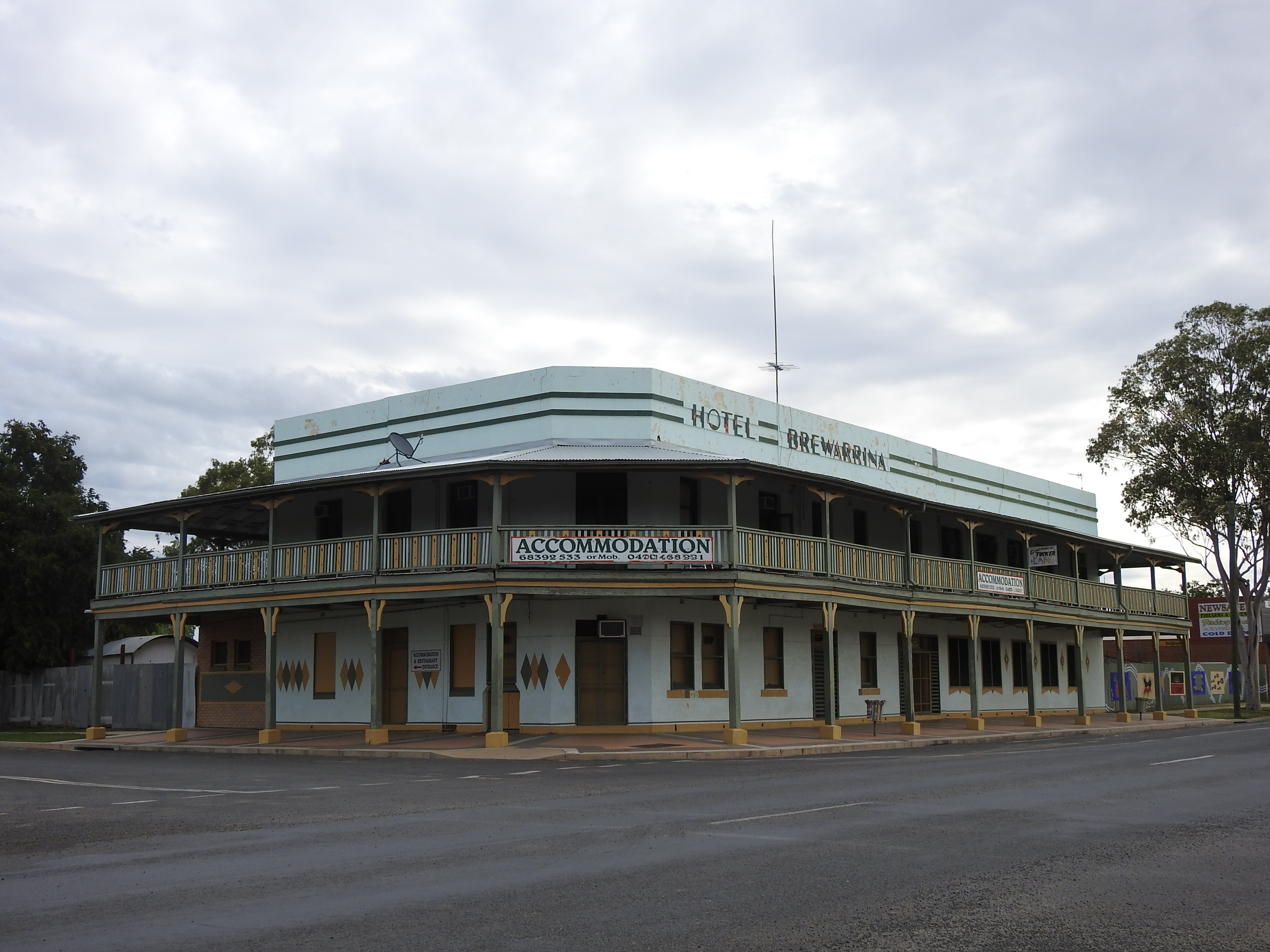
Hotel Brewarrina public hotel (2021)

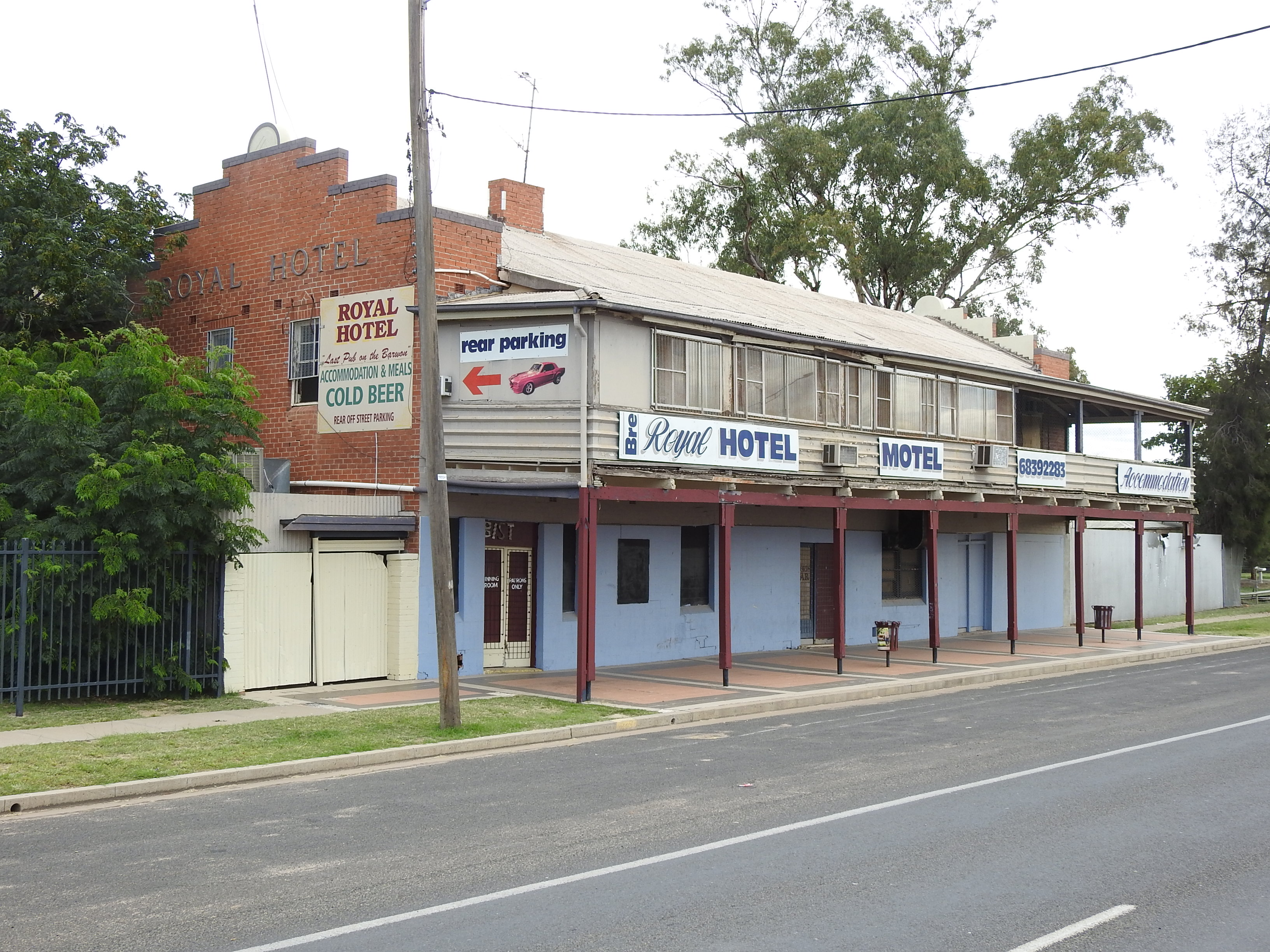
Royal Hotel public hotel (2021)

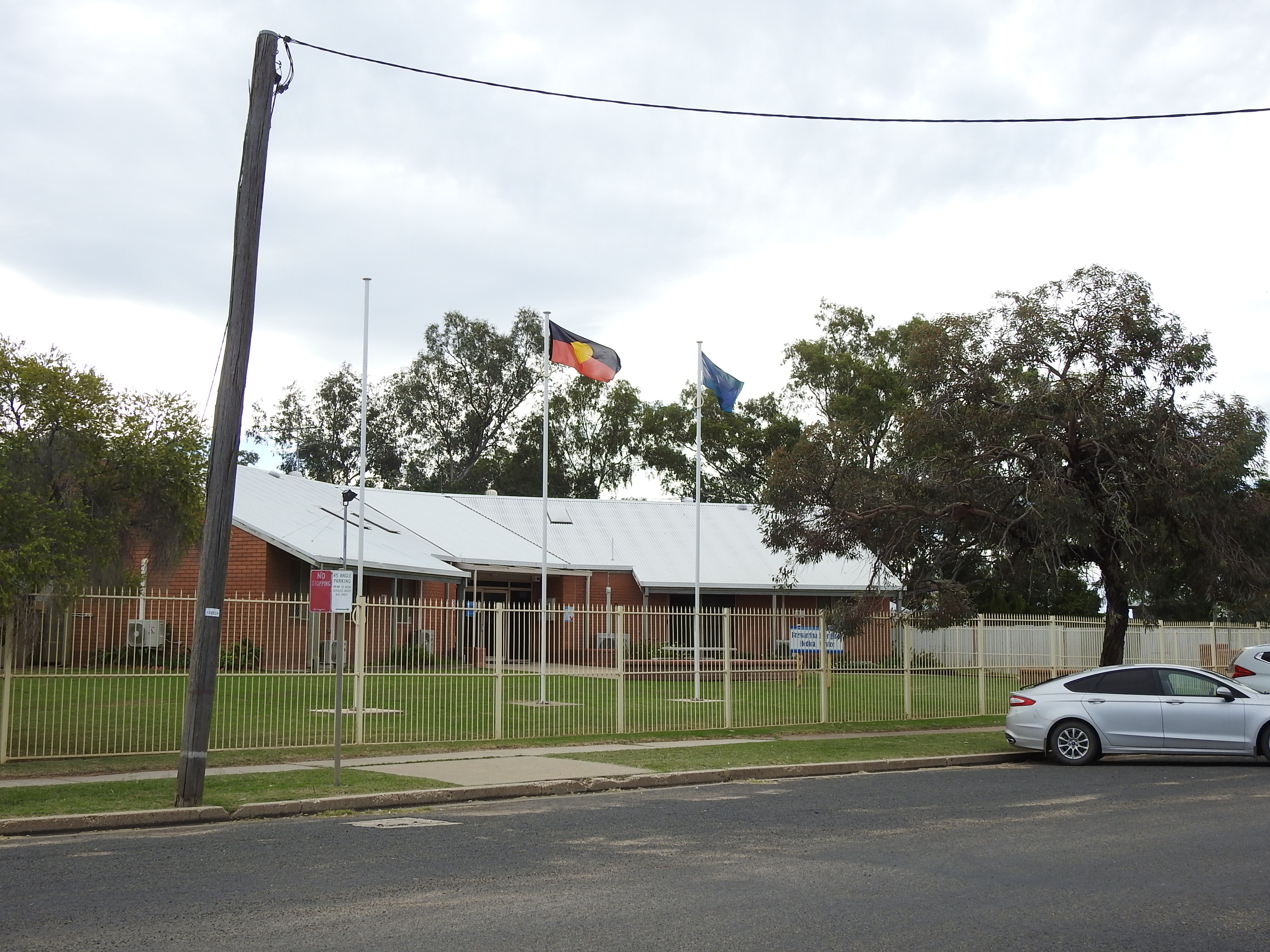
Brewarrina Aboriginal Medical Service centre, Sandon Street, intersecting Bourke Street (2021)

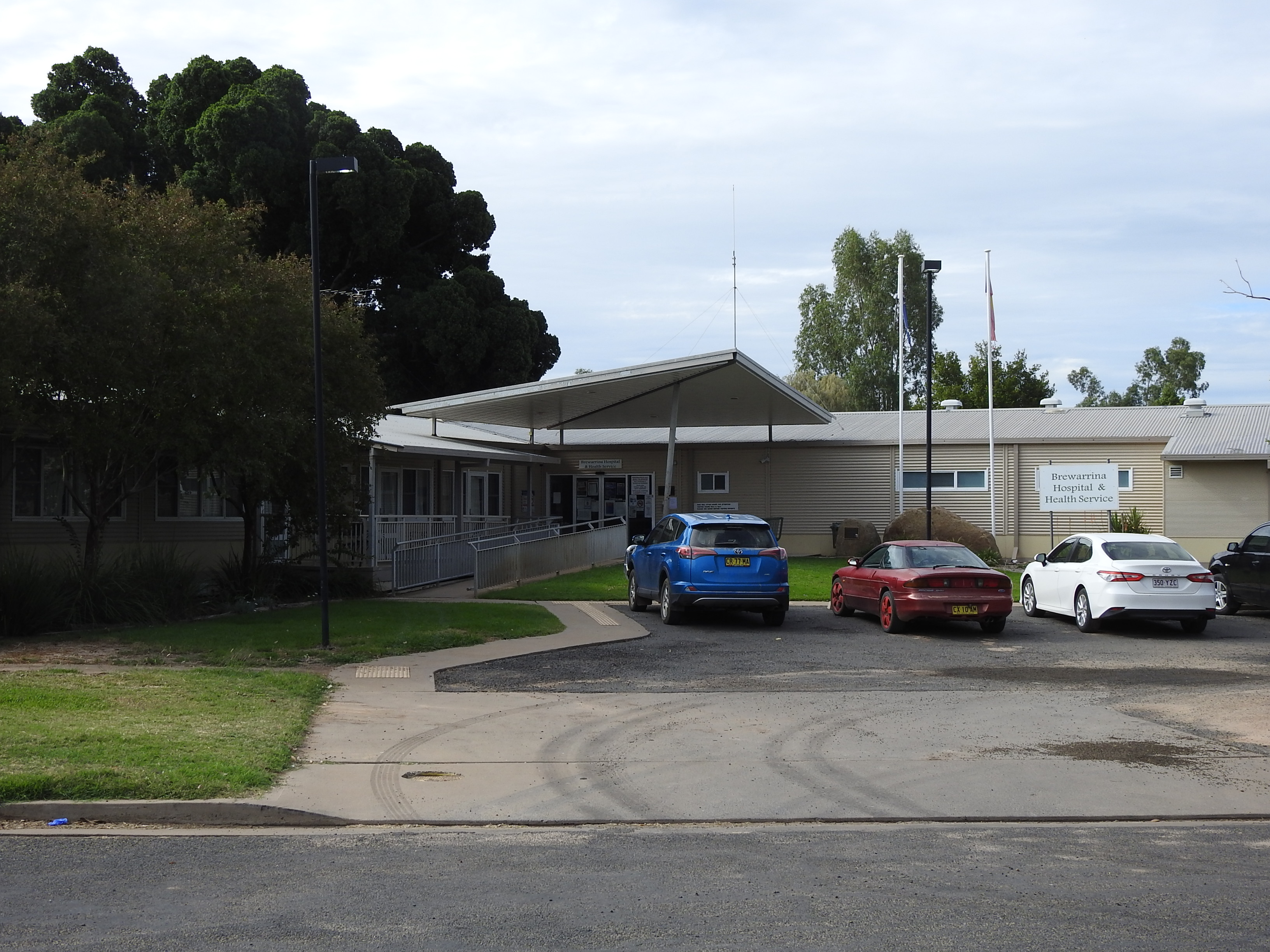
Hospital (2021)

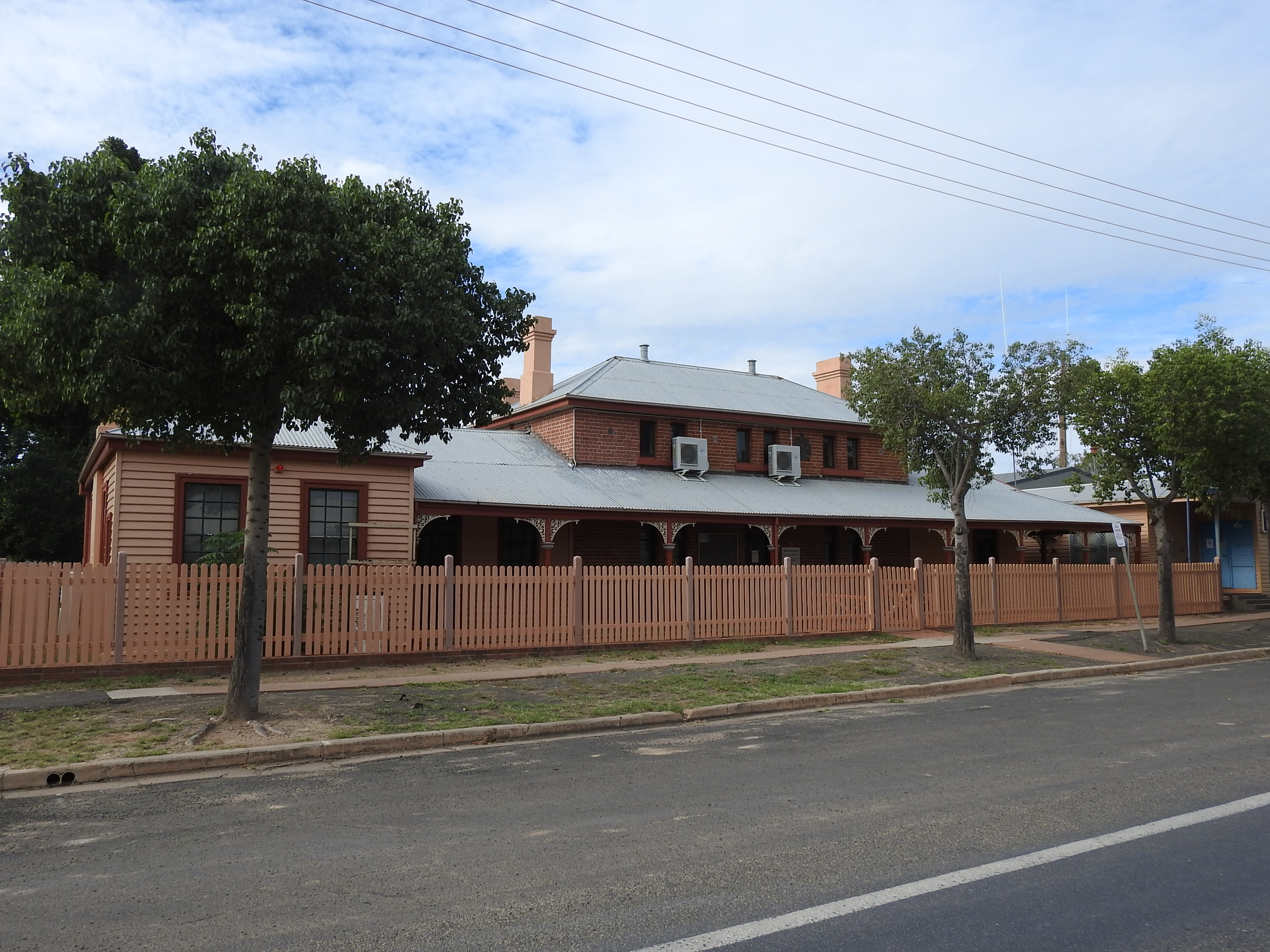
Court house (2021)

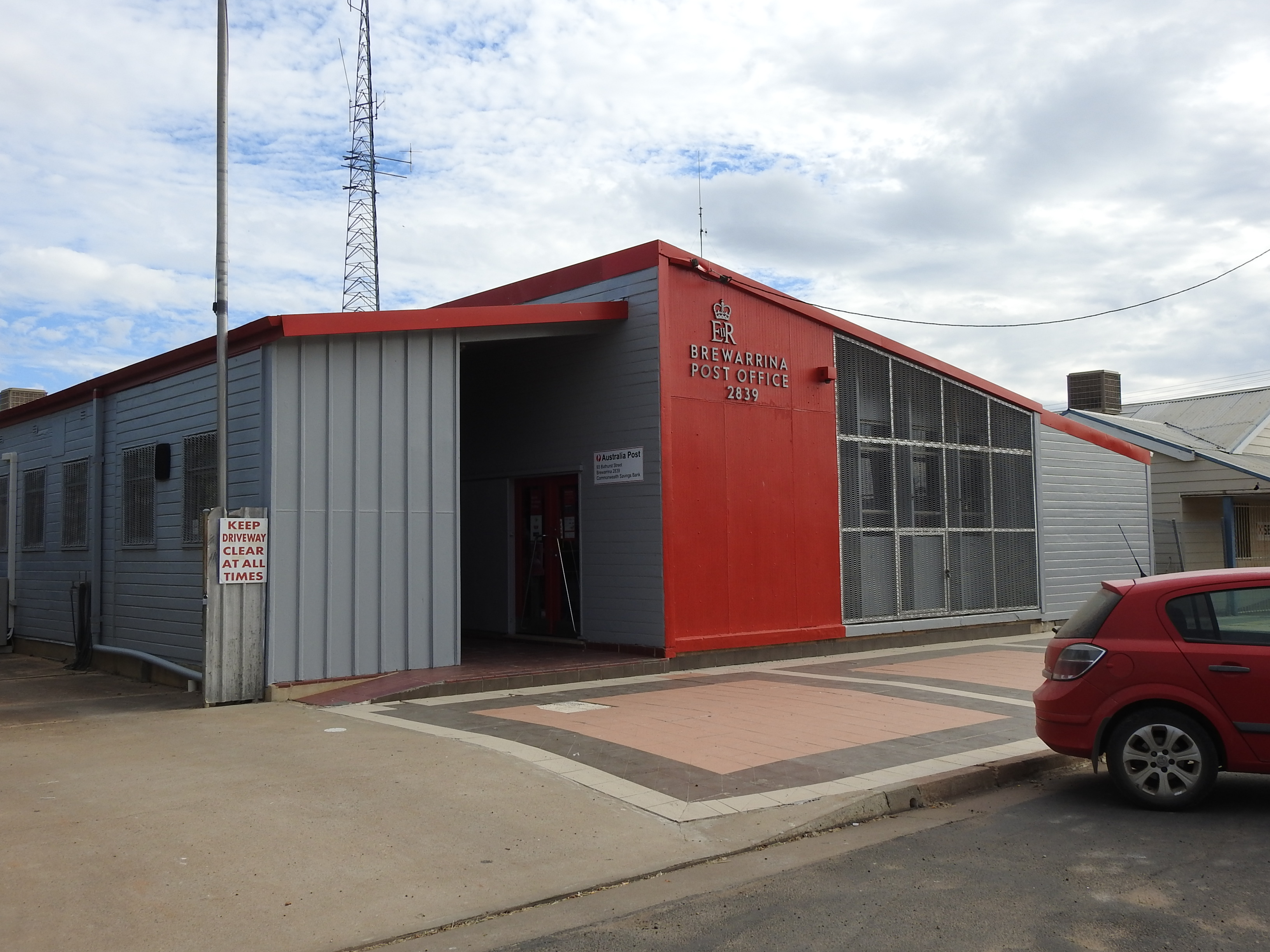
Australia Post office (2021)

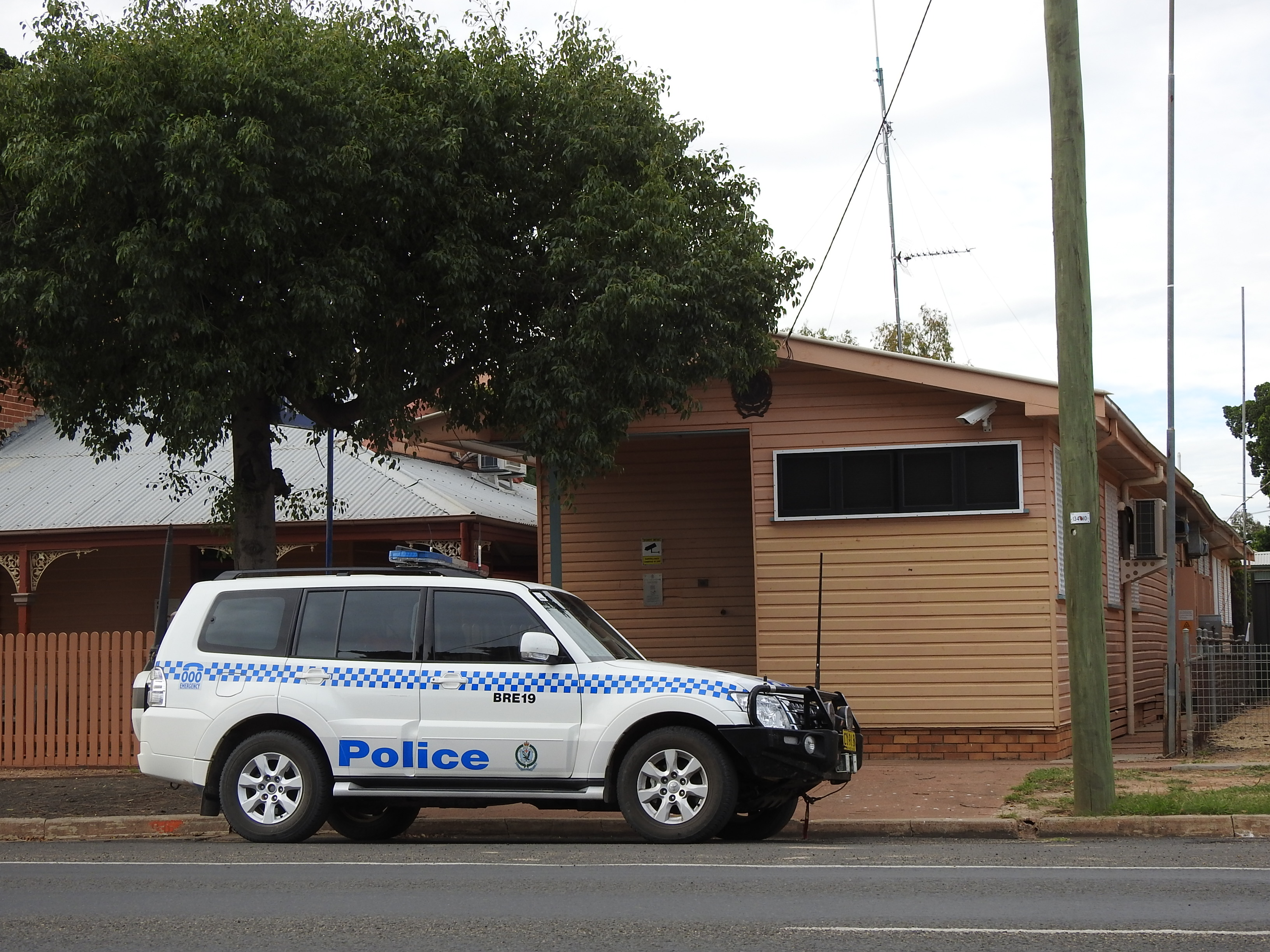
NSW Police Force station (2021)

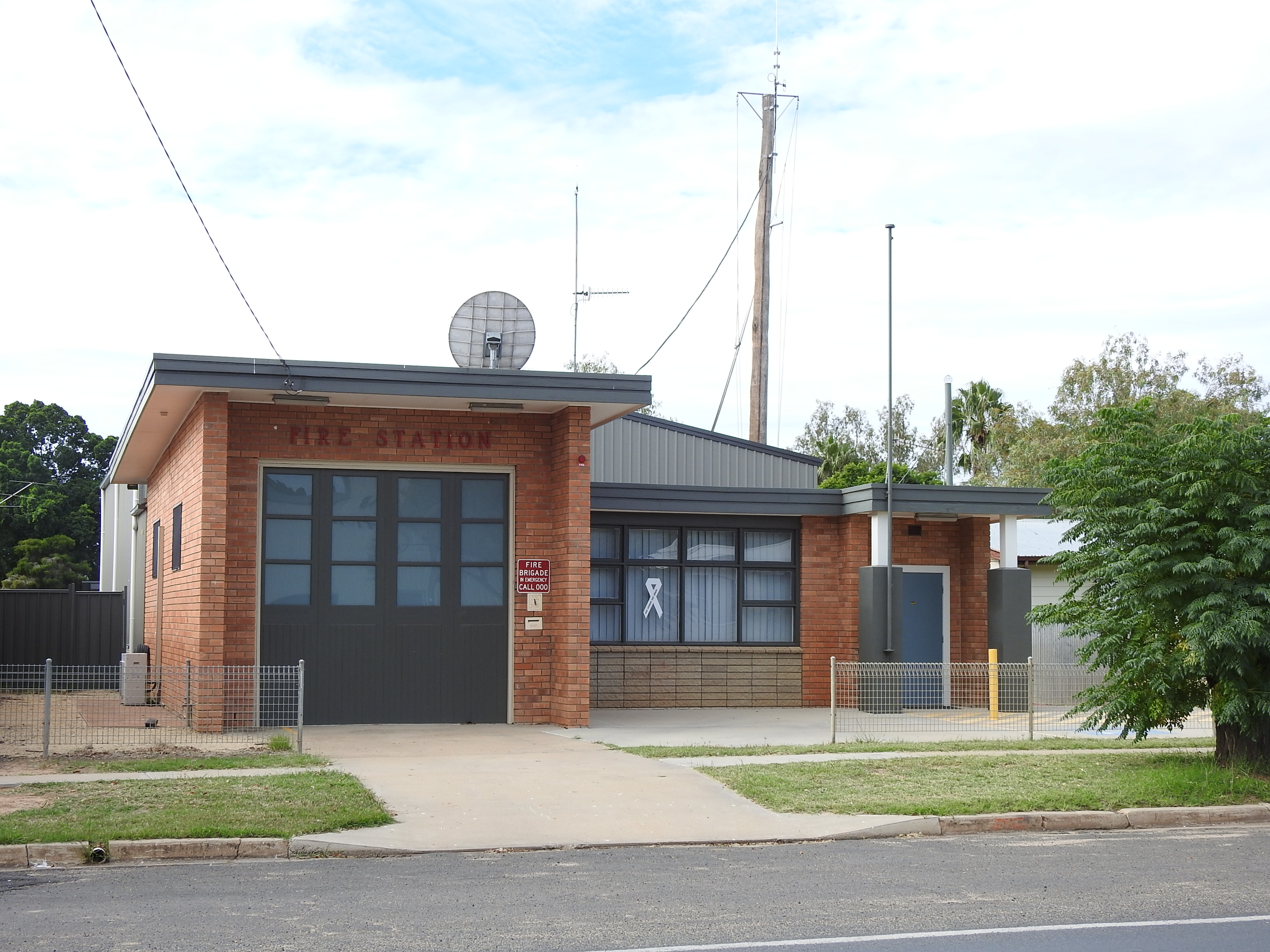
Fire station (2021)

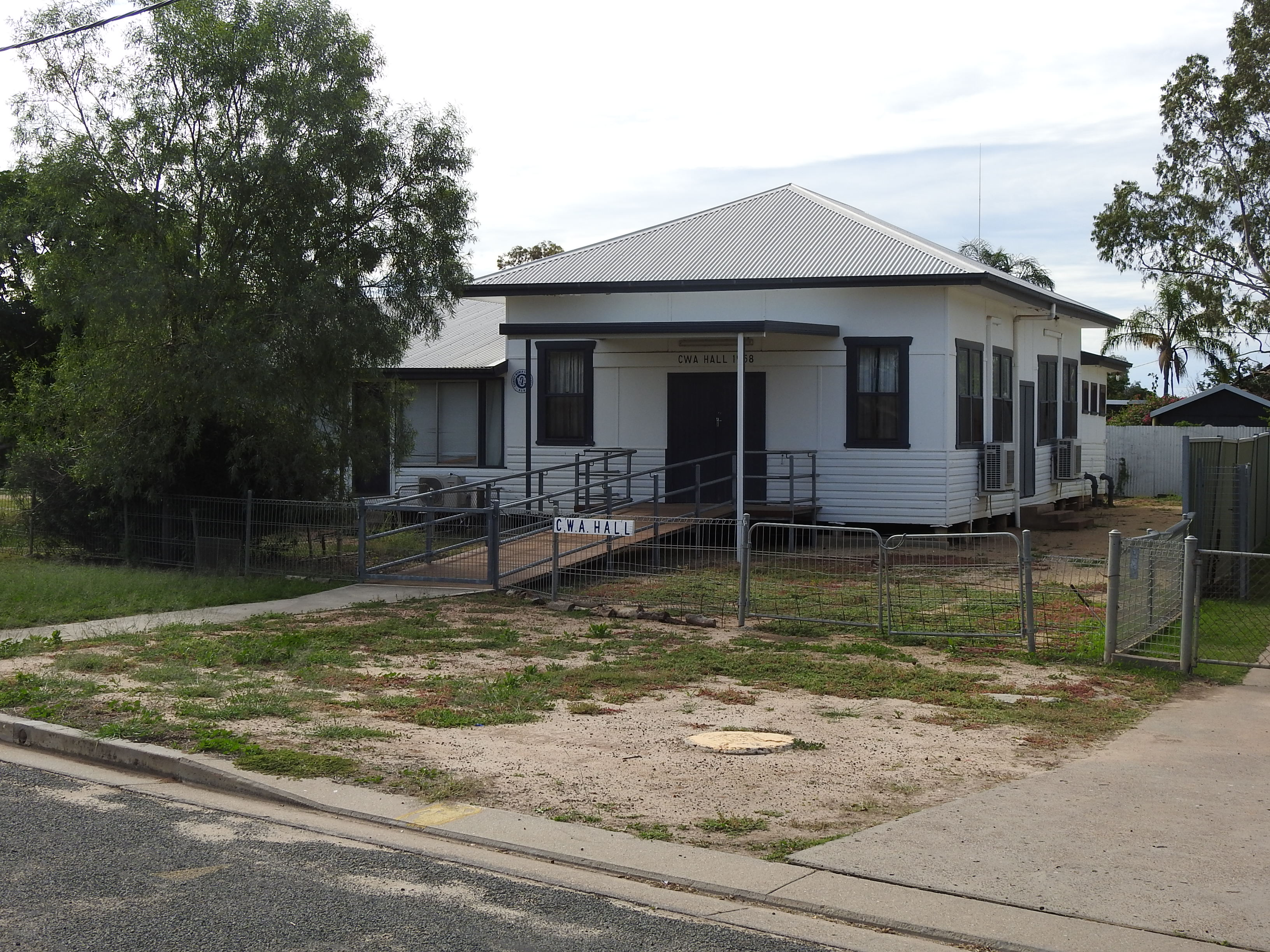
Country Women's Association rest room (2021)

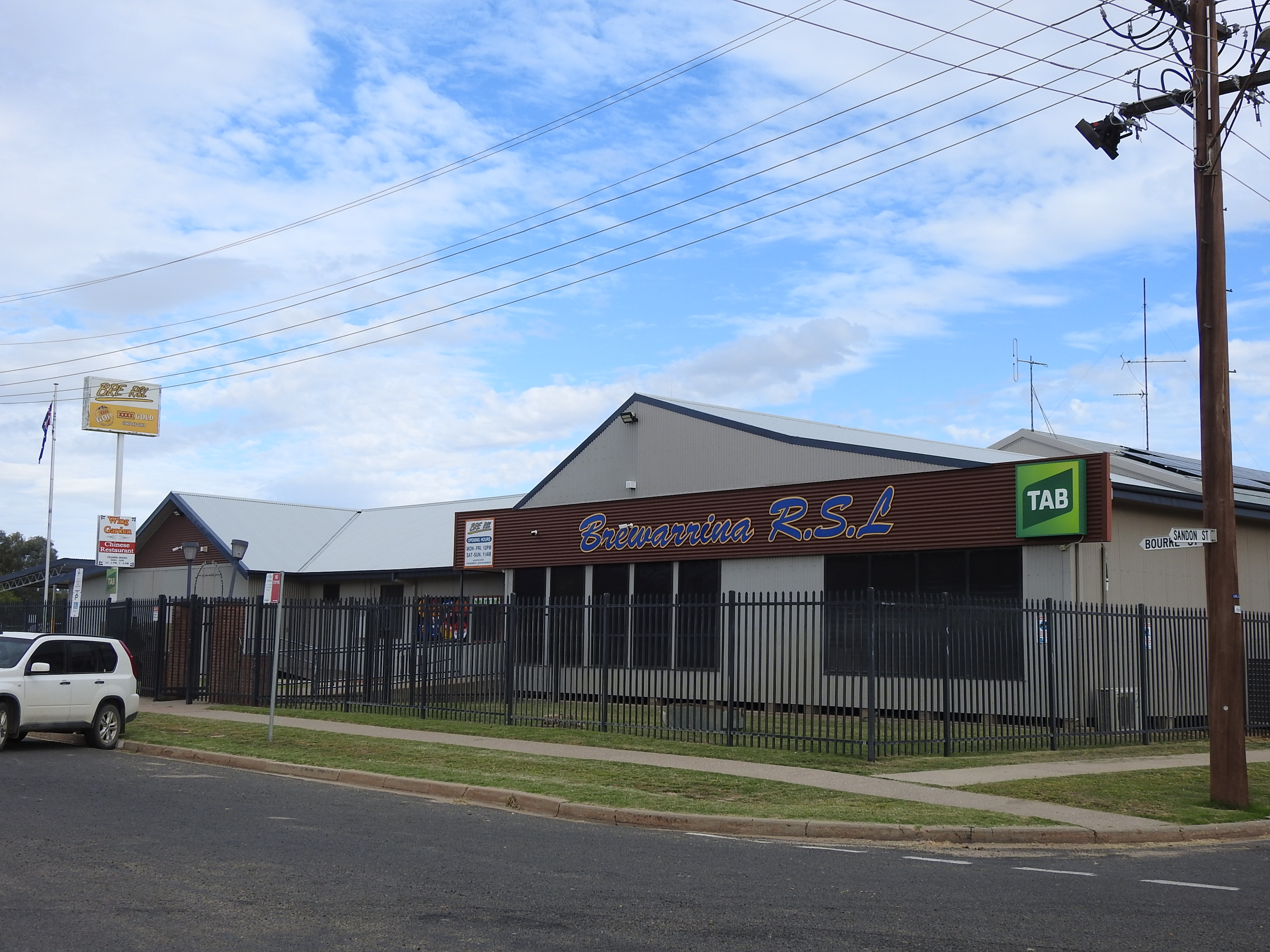
Returned and Services League hall (2021)

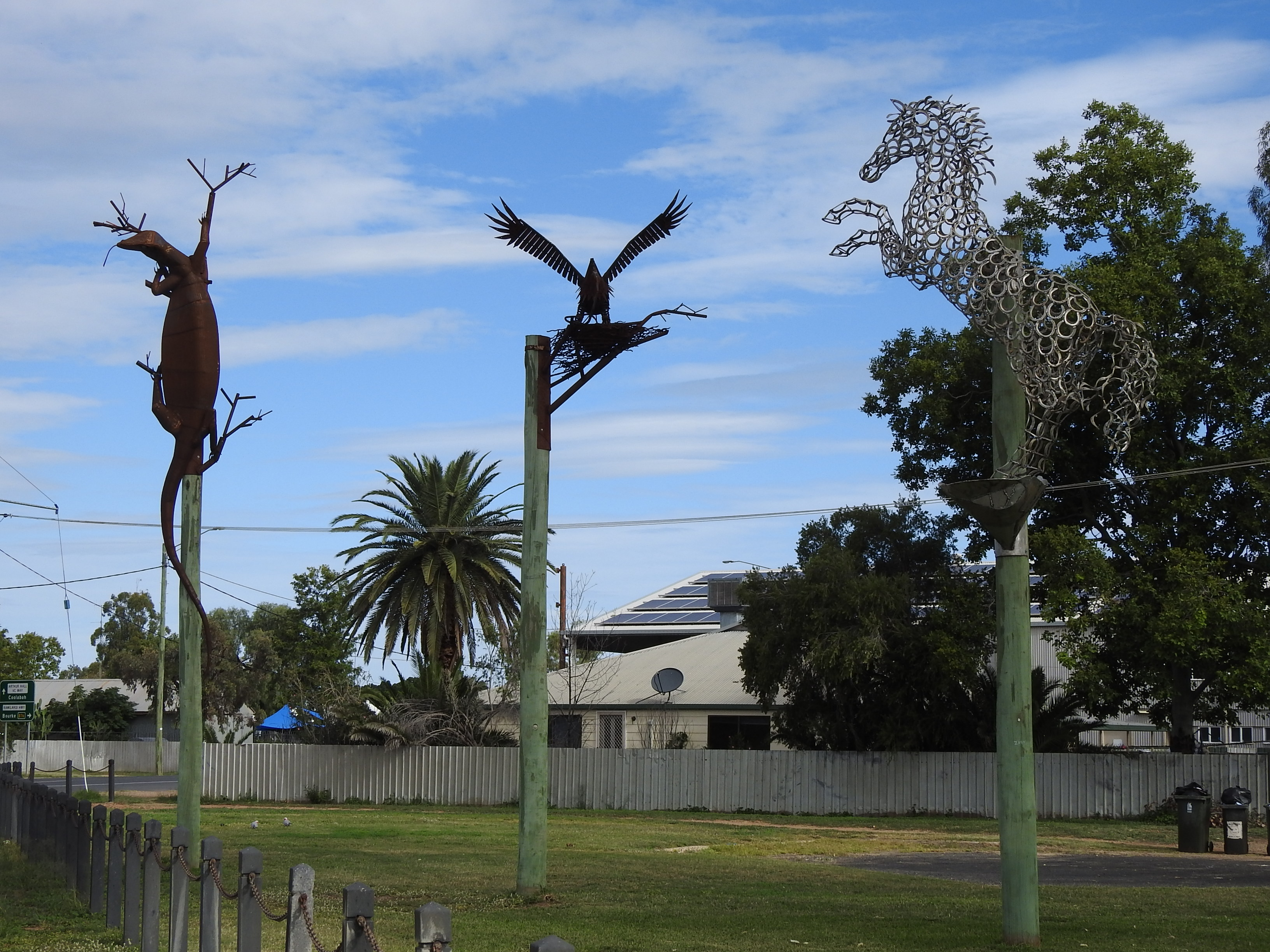
Art work in town park on Bridge Street (2021)
