= Ashley Gordon =

Australian rugby league footballer

Personal information
- Full name: Ashley Gordon
- Born: 6 March 1969 (age 57) Collarenebri, New South Wales, Australia

Playing information
- Position: Wing, Fullback
Club
Years	Team	Pld	T	G	FG	P
1989–92	Newcastle Knights	56	33	56	2	246
1993	Penrith Panthers	7	0	0	0	0
1995	Newcastle Knights	15	5	0	0	20
	Total	78	38	56	2	266
Representative
Years	Team	Pld	T	G	FG	P
1991–95	NSW Country	2	1	0	0	4
- Source: As of 6 February 2019
- Relatives: Isaac Gordon (cousin)

Ashley Gordon is a former professional Indigenous Australian rugby league footballer who played in the 1980s and 1990s as a winger and positions for the Newcastle Knights and Penrith Panthers in the NRL. Gordon was recognised in 1990 as the best wing of the year winning the Dally M Winger of the Year.

Gordon is the second cousin of Cronulla-Sutherland Sharks winger Isaac Gordon.

== Background ==
Gordon was born in Brewarrina, New South Wales. Gordon played junior rugby league at Cardiff, before moving to Souths Newcastle.

== Playing career ==
Gordon played for the Newcastle Knights for most of his career. Gordon then played for the Penrith Panthers for a year and came back to the Knights for a farewell year.
