= Calga Aboriginal Cultural Landscape =

- Location within New South Wales
- 33.4217°S 151.2154°E
- Location: Peats Ridge Road, Calga, Central Coast Council, New South Wales, Australia

New South Wales Heritage Register
- Official name: Calga Aboriginal Cultural Landscape; Calga Aboriginal Women's Site; Calga Aboriginal Sites
- Type: State heritage (landscape)
- Designated: 1 October 2019
- Reference no.: 2014
- Type: Site complex
- Category: Aboriginal

Calga Aboriginal Cultural Landscape is a heritage-listed site at Peats Ridge Road, Calga, in the Central Coast region of New South Wales, Australia. It is also known as Calga Aboriginal Women's Site and Calga Aboriginal Sites. It was added to the New South Wales State Heritage Register on 1 October 2019.

== History ==
=== The Peats Ridge Songline ===
The Calga Aboriginal Cultural Landscape (Calga ACL) is located along the primary ridgeline of Peats Ridge which has been identified as a traditional Aboriginal walking route between the Hawkesbury and the Hunter rivers. Aboriginal people commonly followed ridgelines to travel through rough country. The route would be used to visit neighbours for trade, to arrange marriage, participate in ceremony or other cultural events. Often these routes were understood as shared areas along which "strangers" could travel through another group's lands without causing offence. Modern roads in Australia often follow traditional songlines and routes of Aboriginal communities, reflecting how European settlers relied on the knowledge of Aboriginal guides to traverse the country. Over time these "explorers" routes became more formalised into roads and highways, as seen with Peats Ridge Road.

Aboriginal people identify routes such as Peats Ridge as songlines, routes that ancestral beings such as Baiame, Bootha and Daramulan took across the land, the knowledge of which is passed down through oral histories. The landscape along the songline is often marked by the actions taken by these ancestral beings in the past, physically expressed through their works such as rock engravings and, also through natural landmarks or features including topography, waterholes and trees. These would be interpreted and navigated by knowledge passed down through traditional songs and stories. As such, the songline provides a practical and mental map of important travel routes, and is also used to teach people about The Dreaming, the law and about obligations to Country. Songlines are still physically travelled as a teaching device for learning about Country, spirituality, ceremony and men's and women's business. The physical act of travelling the route and interpreting and responding appropriately to its markers is valued as an important part of the learning process.

=== Ancestral beings ===
The Calga Aboriginal Cultural Landscape is recognised by Aboriginal people to have been marked by the presence of ancestral beings. Belief in certain creator beings is recorded as being common to Aboriginal groups across much of southeastern Australia. These creator beings were called different names in different areas, with variations in stories about their deeds. In the Sydney region there is a belief in three main ancestral beings who travelled across the land during the Dreaming, performing various deeds and creating other beings and the landscape as it is today.

These three primary figures are Baiame, the father, his wife Bootha, and their son Daramulan. The stories about their deeds and travels across the landscape vary from place to place but the belief in their role in creating the world links many Aboriginal nations together, often across vast distances. These figures are not perceived as having existed in the past but continue to exist and participate in life and ceremony in the present day. In some communities Baiame and Daramulan are understood to be different names for the same being, however, in those such as Darkinjung country they are known as father and son. These ancestral beings, sometimes referred to as culture heroes, are often identified in rock art from identifying features including larger than life size, combination of human and animal-life features and/or depiction of animal totems.

According to the local Darkinjung and Guringai communities, Biame and Bootha, at a site near Mooney Mooney, first instructed the other totemic ancestral beings to go out and create the land. One of these was Echidna who journeyed north performing various deeds before finally stopping, taking the form of Mount Yengo. At this time Baiame and Bootha also travelled across the land, eventually coming to Baiame Cave in Wonnarua Country southwest of Singleton. Within Baiame Cave pigment art depicts Baiame with his arms outstretched, said to be protecting the Hunter Valley. In addition to the Guringai and Darkinjung communities, those of broader south eastern Australia including the Wonnarua people believe that after he had finished creating the world he stepped on Mount Yengo and returned up into the sky, flattening its top. From the sky he took an all-seeing interest in people and particularly their conduct of male initiation. Places visited by Baiame are sometimes marked with distinctive engravings of his footsteps. Such places include the Brewarrina Fishtraps created by Baiame, Yambacoona Mountain where he taught community the lesson to share resources with each other and Mount Drysdale where he sleeps.

According to the local Darkinjung and Guringai communities, Bootha was originally the holder of the law and gave it to her son Daramulan who in turn gave it to Aboriginal people via initiation ceremony known in this part of Australia as the Bora, Burbung or Boraba. Daramulan is often depicted in rock art as a male figure either in profile or front on with a club foot or one leg or alternatively he is depicted as an emu. Boys are called to initiation by the sound of the bullroarer, which represents Daramulan's thundering voice. The Law of Daramulan is well documented by early European anthropologists such as R. H. Matthews: 'His name is made up from dhurru, thigh, and mulan, one side, the whole name meaning leg-on-one-side, as he is said to possess one leg only... He had a voice like the rumbling of distant thunder. It fell to his lot to separate the youths from their mothers and teach them the Burbung ceremonies'.

Like her son, Bootha's totem is the emu. She is sometimes depicted as an emu, or emu-woman, but such depictions are comparatively rare. She has a special name which is rarely spoken except by those for whom it is socially appropriate.

Aboriginal people from across eastern Australia express similar understandings of Daramulan's role as son of Bootha and central figure in initiation ceremonies. The emu story extends from the Pacific Ocean into the Northern Territory, the path of the story following the rising of the sun from east to west.

Aboriginal people recognise the Calga ACL as an important ceremonial place with a special association with these creation beings. At the women's site, the engraving of the female figure is determined, by its larger than life size, rare detailing (which reflects ceremonial practice and cannot be made public due to gendered cultural sensitivities), association with the large emu and footprint engravings and its proximity to ceremonial stone arrangements to be a depiction of Bootha, the wife of Baiame. The footprint is identified to have been made by Baiame and the emu is recognised as Daramulan by its size. This is reinforced by the womb-like shape of the amphitheatre which physically embraces the site and provides privacy, safety, resources and amenity for Bootha and ceremony related to her.

The heavy concentration of motifs related to Daramulan in the eastern portion of the site is seen to be highly symbolic, given the regional context and location along the songline. The profile emu with a three-toed foot and large protruding chest is interpreted as Daramulan in emu form, the prostrate male human figure shown pointing west with a small bandicoot alongside is interpreted as a "guide" pointing the way to men's ceremonial grounds further along the songline. The one-legged human figure is interpreted as Daramulan calling the mothers to bring their sons to him to be initiated and learn the Law that Bootha had given him.

In light of this, the topography of the landscape, which is seen to be protectively embracing all within it in the shape of a womb, and its key location adjacent to the songline, the Calga Aboriginal Cultural Landscape is recognised as the highly place where Daramulan came into being and was first given the Law. It also marks the place where boys were separated from their mothers and taken for initiation, where they would die as boys and be reborn as men. It is a place where Law is respected, adhered to, practised and passed on.

=== The cultural landscape ===
The term cultural landscape refers to "the combined works of nature and man", as designated in Article 1 of the World Heritage Convention. An Aboriginal cultural landscape is "a place or area valued by an Aboriginal group (or groups) because of their long and complex relationship with that land. It expresses their unity with the natural and spiritual environment. It embodies their traditional knowledge of spirits, places, land uses, and ecology. Material remains of the association may be prominent, but will often be minimal or absent".

First introduced to the English speaking world by geographer Carl Sauer in the 1920s, the concept of cultural landscapes became broadly embraced by the cultural heritage management discipline across the world in the 1990s. At this time, practitioners in NSW and the NSW government began to move away from previous conceptions of Aboriginal Cultural Heritage as physical objects or archaeology such as rock art, to a richer recognition of multi-faceted Aboriginal Cultural Landscapes imbued with meaning. Where, previously, there had been a sole focus on NSW Aboriginal Heritage Information Management System (AHIMS) data of known recorded objects and archaeology known as "sites", contemporary NSW best practice recognises that complexes of "sites" are understood as part of cultural landscapes made up of layers of tangible and intangible significance which expresses the connection of Aboriginal people, past and present, with country.

In 2019, the NSW government formally recognised cultural landscapes in policy: 'For Aboriginal people, the significance of individual landscape features is derived from their interrelatedness within the cultural landscape. This means features cannot be assessed in isolation and any assessment must consider the feature and its associations in a holistic manner. This may require a range of assessment methods and will always require the close involvement and participation of Aboriginal people. By consulting with Aboriginal people and using the concept of cultural landscapes, the story behind the features can be told which demonstrates the associations that may exist between Aboriginal objects and other features within the landscape'

Study of the cultural landscape and its tangible and intangible markers and underpinnings allows for a rich understanding of the traditional connection of Aboriginal people past and present with totemic ancestral beings and with country. The womb-shaped valley comprises not just the women's ceremonial area along the northern ridge, but also the Daramulan-related area of particular significance to men which tells an important part of the story of Daramulan's coming into being and passing down of the law to men through initiation. It also comprises north-facing shelters along the eastern ridge and open camp areas at the base of the gully where groups could be supported for camping and preparation prior for ceremony.

The significance of the Calga Aboriginal Cultural Landscape can be understood through interpretation of these interrelated tangible and intangible layers. Across the site, interconnected journey and directional markers, including topography, water sources, vegetation, rock art and stone arrangements have traditionally signalled information including directions, boundaries of initiated authorization, ritual practices and/or stories. The ability to identify and interpret these journey and directional markers and their related songs, stories and ritual practices is traditionally passed down through generations of Aboriginal people. Transmission of knowledge is based on factors including age and gender, and was undertaken gradually over the course of a person's life.

Ritualised movement through the Calga ACL involves this process of signal interpretation undertaken during travel along the natural pathways created by the terraced sandstone platforms and sloped contour of the land. In addition to providing necessary seclusion of vegetation and landform at key points, the landscape also offers key sightlines across and within the natural amphitheatre and into it from the Peats Road Ridgeline. In addition to providing amenity such as privacy the landform and vegetation possess intangible values which tie together the special associations, attachments, meanings, memories, stories and beliefs of the cultural landscape.

=== Cultural law and gender ===
Much of the symbolism of the engravings, stone arrangements, landforms and vegetation of the site has been identified as being associated with secret women's business. For Aboriginal people of south east Australia gendered cultural divisions traditionally pervade broad areas of community life ranging from practical hunting and fishing practices to spiritual matters, according to cultural law. Aboriginal cultural law (sometimes referred to as traditional law or customary law) refers to the rules of acceptable and unacceptable behaviour in traditional Aboriginal communities. It refers to the rules for living, established by ancestral beings during The Dreaming. Passed down by oral tradition, song, dance, art, ritual and ceremony, the law covers ritual, economic, residential and kinship rules and conventions, care of sacred places and objects, the division of labour by gender, etc. A major tenant of cultural law is the obligation to care for country. The ceremonies of men's business and women's business emphasize both the difference between the two sexes, and the ways they complement and depend on each other in traditional society.

=== Women's business ===
For women, ritual and ceremonial duties, stories, songs, dances and knowledge associated with woman's business is passed down through generations at the appropriate age. Women's business includes rites and ceremony centred on female milestones, for example, birth, childhood, puberty, fertility, childbirth and death, but can also include a wide range of social ceremonies including those aimed at healing, dealing with quarrels, relationships, or bringing relatives home safely from a journey. Knowledge and practice of Women's business links Aboriginal women with each other and with their totemic ancestors from the Dreaming.

A level of seclusion or secrecy is often required, the exclusion of men and sometimes children can be important for their safety and wellbeing, and because their presence or knowledge of the rites could impair the success of the ceremony. There are supernaturally and socially derived consequences for those who disrespect cultural law.

The womb-shaped amphitheatre is important for women's business. In particular, the shape of the landform and associated views, vegetation, iconography of engravings and associated series of stone arrangements on the northern ridgeline of the natural amphitheatre have been noted as indications that it is sacred area for women's business. Archaeological and anthropological research supports the combined cultural knowledge of local Aboriginal people which indicates that this area on the northern ridgeline is a place of teaching and ceremony related to sacred women's business. Believed to have been marked by the presence of creation deities, Baiame, Bootha and Daramulan, the landscape is recognised as the birthplace of Daramulan, the place where the lore was first passed from Bootha to Daramulan and a place where young women were initiated into sacred women's business. Further detail of this northern ceremonial area and its use is not able to be shared publicly in light of these gendered cultural sensitivities.

Beyond the sacred ceremonial area on the northern ridgeline, the cultural landscape comprises various other spaces and markers associated with women's business. For example, part of the southern area is of special significance to women, including a cave with red hand stencils and a group of ponds.

Further investigation of the site has the potential to provide further in-depth understandings of how Aboriginal people, and especially Aboriginal women, engaged with and derived meaning from the landscape. The importance of this anthropological potential is heightened by its richness and rarity, considering that historically, anthropological documentation of Aboriginal cultural practice has been dominated by a focus on men's ceremony.

=== European occupation ===
Due to the rugged nature of the inland areas of the Central Coast places such as Calga remained undeveloped for a significant period following European settlement of NSW. The land comprised within the Calga ACL was set aside in late 1915 but it was not until February 1931 that the properties became available as Homestead Farms, part of a program designed to support returning servicemen by providing them with land and financial assistance. The land was described at the time as comprising gently sloping country with rocky sandstone ledges.

Frequently changing hands, during the twentieth century the properties were used for citrus orchards although much of the land was likely too steep, rough and sandy for further cultivation. At some time during the twentieth century a small area of Lot 40, DP 1087374 was mined for shale. Although clearing and earthworks associated with this may have impacted upon natural features, art and/or archaeological deposits no specific instances of this have been identified. It is not considered that these isolated agricultural and industrial works have severed connections across the amphitheatre or present a significant obstacle to ongoing work to investigate and interpret the traditional use and meaning of the landscape.

It was reported that when the land within current Lot 1 DP805358 was first cleared and ploughed, a "blackfellows" ground' was uncovered at the "back" of the property. The nature of this comment, made by a local resident, Mr H Cook to Ian Sims in the 1960s is likely to refer to the disturbance of Aboriginal objects, possibly around the convergence of the two first order channels in the gully where orchards were grown during the twentieth century.

Construction of Peats Ridge Road in the late 1960s, which involved large earth works and rock cuttings, destroyed some of the known sites along the ridgeline including a significant Daramulan engraving and further engravings of Baiame's footsteps. Further reported engraving sites in this small area, east of Peats Ridge Road, were unable to be located in a ground truthing exercise in October 2017 and may have also been destroyed since the 1960s.

Whilst intangible links between these engraving sites east of Peats Ridge Road and the boundary of the Calga ACL continue to be valued by the local Aboriginal community, and recognised to be linked with a broader network of sites east of the songline, these substantial earth works have impacted upon the connections beyond the natural amphitheatre of the Calga ACL. The link between the songline and Calga ACL is still discernible through remaining sites such as the profile engraving of a woman in the eastern side of the Peats Ridge Road easement (within the Calga ACL boundary) which is identified to be a way marker for pregnant women.

Civil works such as an electrical line easement now transect the site. Although clearing and earthworks associated with these works may have impacted on natural features, art and/or archaeological deposits no specific instances of this have been identified. It is not considered that these civil works have severed connections across the amphitheatre or present a significant obstacle to ongoing work to investigate and interpret the traditional use and meaning of the landscape.

=== Late twentieth-century developments ===
From the 1960s, various operators began sand and clay quarrying in the area on a small scale and in an ad hoc manner. Management practices resulted in the degradation of Cabbage Tree Creek and its tributaries. In 1990 the Land and Environment Court ordered the quarrying to cease operations because of a lack of compliance with the relevant Act. In 1991 a new operator, Calga Sands Pty Ltd received approval to recommence quarrying within Lot 2 DP 229889. Rocla Materials Pty Ltd took over control of the quarry from Calga Sands in October 2002, and operated in until the 1991 consent lapsed on 1 January 2005. In 2004 Rocla lodged a proposal to re-open and extend the quarry to the north that was approved in November 2005. These works appear to have dramatically altered the northern ridgeline of the natural amphitheatre comprised within the Calga ACL with the resultant effect that the ability to identify and interpret any sites on this former high point and associated views and intangible connections were lost.

At the western extent of the natural amphitheatre, the property was operated from 1972 as Glenworth Valley, a horse riding business. Latterly, the business expanded to include outdoor adventure activities.

Encompassing the southern extent of the natural amphitheatre, Popran National Park was gazetted National Park in 1994 and it protects an area of native vegetation and wildlife corridor between Brisbane Water National Park to the east and Dharug National Park to the west. Popran National Park was named after the major creek which flows through the park and the local Parish of Popran.

At the south-eastern extent, a wildlife sanctuary was operated from 2001. It was originally opened by Barry Cohen (a former Federal Minister for the Arts, Heritage and the Environment) who bought the land, made it into a park, known as Calga Springs Sanctuary. Cohen sold the property in 2005 and new owners acquired the lease of adjacent Crown Land in 2012. Surrounded by a fox-and cat-proof fence, the exclusion area is home to approximately 180 species of mammals, birds, reptiles and frogs.

=== Reconnection with the women's site ===
The "women's site", a rare and sacred pecked engraving of a profile woman, was first recorded in European records in a survey by Ian M. Sim in 1962. It was later relocated and photographed by Warren Bluff in 1993. In the context of proposed quarry extension into Lot 1/805358 the site was relocated in 2006, by John Appleton and Warren Bluff who noted it had been impacted by a covering of leaf detritus and roots.

The landowner, Rocla Quarries, commissioned several consultants over the following six years to undertake assessments of impact of the proposed extension of the mine. Over the course of these investigations many Aboriginal sites including stone arrangements several rock engravings, artefact scatters and shelters with art, were located in the landscape in the vicinity of the "women's site".

As part of these early investigations commissioned by the landowner it was identified that although there was an understanding within some members of the Aboriginal community that the land in question was of great significance to Aboriginal people, knowledge of the specific "women's site" had been lost to at least some of the community as part of the impact of dispossession from the land which had resulted from government policies which discouraged this in the past. When local Aboriginal people recorded the women's site in 2005 as part of the teams undertaking assessments commissioned by the land owner it was immediately recognised as a rare and important sacred women's site, thus affirming local oral history about a sacred area.

From that time, in addition to extensive archaeological and ethnographic research commissioned by the landowner(s) the community began a process of coming together to combine their collective cultural knowledge to interpret the site. Local Aboriginal women have noted how the reconnection has acted as an important catalyst for bringing together people who hold different important pieces of its story and meaning. This reconnection of different pieces of the story is both an important community effort to address the cultural dislocation of colonisation, but also reflects the traditional system of gradual initiation and transmission of cultural knowledge within Aboriginal communities, whereby different individuals were charged with different components of cultural law/lore (based on factors including age, gender, level of initiation, role within the clan group, etc.).

This system of gradual knowledge inheritance is captured by Graham Walsh:

All over Australia the stories, great and small, are told to the proper people at the proper time. The paths of the creator-powers link up the places where their mighty deeds took place and where other powers left descendants of Wallaby, Emu, Goanna, Yam and a host of others. Teachings are often followed, correct observance of ritual carries the religious law down through the generations, and only in old age can any person expect to have the great wisdom of dreaming, to receive the secret keys which unlock real understanding

— Graham Walsh

Warpiri elder, Wanta Jampijinpa further reflects on the value of sharing knowledge about country:

There are "few who still know how to listen to country. Our libraries exist within the country. They are embedded in our land archives and in our people. There is so much to learn within this country. Feeding each other stories keeps us from being hungry. Sharing it is like leading each other back home".

— Wanta Jampijinpa

The community have also stated that the reconnection with the Calga Aboriginal Women's Site and the appeal to stop the proposed extension of the Calga sand quarry has helped to heal rifts and bring together formerly disparate parts of the Central Coast Aboriginal community. It is believed that this is not a coincidence, and that the site itself holds a power which acts in the world, bringing women together to learn and share their knowledge of Aboriginal culture.

The reconnection has allowed female elders to use the site and the combined knowledge its discovery has brought together in the teaching of young girls about Aboriginal culture, womanhood and their heritage. Tracey Howie describes this:

it is in our being ... it is in us ... it is our skin ... for us to teach and support our fore-girl leaders emerging from our future leading women. Connection with this site and its surrounds, brings together a unity of continued learning, bringing together females, to share knowledge of Aboriginal culture across a diverse range of backgrounds.

— Tracey Howie

Uniting around a common cause was a significant moment for many Aboriginal women involved in the appeal against the mine extension not only as a confirmation of their Aboriginality but also of their value and right to be heard specifically as Aboriginal women. This grassroots movement on the Central Coast was documented in local newspapers over several years and has had a lasting impact on community, particularly the community of Aboriginal women.

The community have remained committed to recognising and protecting the site's values since the proposed sand mine was refused on appeal, with Aboriginal communities from across Australia recognising its particular significance and connection to their places and stories in 2018.

==== Proposed quarry extension and Land and Environment Court appeal ====
In October 2006 Rocla first proposed the southern extension of the Calga Sand Quarry onto Lots 1 and 2, DP805358. The new quarry would involve the excavation of a surface area of approximately 500 square metres (5,400 sq ft) at a depth of up to 30 metres (98 ft). The sandstone obtained would be crushed into sand, primarily for the Sydney construction market. The land adjoined the Popran National Park, Peats Ridge Road and some private properties, including the site owned by Australian Walkabout Wildlife Park. The project was granted approval by the PAC under the now repealed provisions of Part 3A of the Environmental Planning and Assessment Act 1979 (NSW) in December 2013.

In November 2015, the New South Wales Land and Environment Court upheld the merit appeal of two objectors against the approval by the Planning and Assessment Commission (PAC) of the proposed quarry extension. The matter was heard over 17 days before two Commissioners of the Land and Environment Court.

The appeal was brought by the Australian Walkabout Wildlife Park, the operator of a wildlife park adjoining the proposed quarry, and Darkinjung Local Aboriginal Land Council, the local Aboriginal land council in whose statutory area the proposed quarry was located. Rocla Materials Pty Ltd, the project proponent, owned the land on which the quarry expansion was proposed. The Minister for Planning was also a respondent.

The hearing was largely confined to matters relating to the project's impact on Aboriginal cultural heritage. The applicants to the proceedings asserted that the rare Women's Site formed part of a broader cultural landscape of a natural amphitheatre with rare tangible and intangible values at local, regional and State levels. In contrast, Rocla asserted that the project area contained "hotspots" such as the women's site, with "free land" in between them. Rocla sought to mitigate the impact of the proposed quarry on the Women's Site by proposing a 60-metre (197 ft) "buffer" around it. The applicants contended that the effect of such a buffer would be to isolate or "island" the women' site and destroy the cultural landscape which is intrinsic to its significance.

The court found that, "there is convincing evidence of the existence of a cultural landscape surrounding the "Women's Site", connecting to other nearby sites and encompassing tangible and intangible elements as described in the relevant OEH policy documents, significant elements of which may extend outside the proposed buffer area".

It also found that there is further potential for the discovery of new significant sites and/or information which might enhance the significance of known sites within the cultural landscape. It stated that further assessment of Aboriginal heritage values would need to encompass all aspects of values in the Burra Charter including not just archaeological and aesthetic values but also, historic and intangible social values:

'The extent of sites in the area, including those which relate to the evidence of past life, points to the fact that Aboriginal people traditionally, actively and intensively utilised an area which includes the Rocla land and probably stretching beyond. The area contains elements such as traditional food and water sources, walking routes, camping places, and abundant rock art, much of it relating to the travels of cultural heroes'.

— Darkinjung Local Aboriginal Land Council v Minister for Planning and Infrastructure [2015] NSWLEC 1465

Further, it applied the Precautionary Principle in finding that, "In the absence of sufficient information we must assume the worst and find that there is a threat of serious and irreversible environmental harm. Therefore, it follows that there is a shift in the evidentiary burden and that Rocla must demonstrate that the threat of serious or irreversible damage does not exist or is negligible. On the evidence, the Court cannot be so satisfied. In the circumstances the preference must be to prevent environmental damage".

The judgement has been recognised as a landmark precedent by the legal industry. Butterly and Petter recognised that the case showed that "the courts are increasingly recognising that cultural heritage consists of much more than artefacts, but includes landscapes and values". Sack, et al. noted that "This case demonstrates that the New South Wales Land and Environment Court is moving with contemporary practice in cultural heritage assessment and management".

== Description ==
The site is a U-shaped gully overlooked by a natural sandstone amphitheatre formed by two westerly spurs off the ridgeline of Peats Ridge Road. Formed by the incision of the sandstone plateau by a tributary of Cabbage Tree Creek, the upper slopes of this amphitheatre between the 150-and-200-metre (490 and 660 ft) contours predominately consist of a series of sandstone platforms which create a terraced landscape. Below the 150 metres (490 ft) contour the topography is generally steep to moderately sloped, running down to the creek at the base of the gully.

There is a high concentration of recorded sites within the Calga Aboriginal Cultural Landscape including but not limited to shelters, engraved and pigment art, stone arrangements, artefact scatters, middens and archaeological deposits. These, in addition to the topography, spatial distribution and orientation and natural resources are known to be inextricably linked in terms of traditional symbolism and practice.

The southern ridgeline of this amphitheatre runs from Peats Ridge ridgeline westward towards a tall knoll, which is a prominent natural landmark. A large sandstone platform is located at the western foot of this knoll which contains a number of engravings. The sandstone platforms on this southern ridge are somewhat higher and steeper than the corresponding contour across the amphitheatre. This has created a number of natural rock shelters which face north across the amphitheatre, some of which have been identified as containing pigmented and engraving rock art and having high potential for archaeological deposits. These north-facing shelters provide important amenity for groups and cultural practice, and are inscribed with totemic meaning. Art in this area is reflective of totemic connections including the engraving of large bird figure with line/spear/rope attached to its back. The line is oriented towards Mount White and an associated group of smaller bird engravings located 20 metres (66 ft) away from the large bird. Part of this southern area is of special significance to women, including a cave with red hand stencils and a group of ponds.

The northern ridgeline of the upper tributary gully forms a series of sandstone terraces. The most notable engraving site, within a women's ceremonial area is located on a large sandstone outcrop, which slopes slightly south along this northern ridgeline. Two large engravings are present on the sandstone surface: a large emu and a prostrate female figure. Both engravings are pecked outlines in the stone. The female figure, identified as Bootha, has very rare, possibly unique detailing which is not able to be publicly shared due to cultural and gender sensitivities. The large emu, identified as Daramulan, is located above the female figure with its head positioned towards her head. The emu is approximately 385 by 310 centimetres (152 in × 122 in). Five peck marks are visible within the head of the emu. A footprint is located 2–3 metres (6 ft 7 in – 9 ft 10 in) to the south of the female figure, and is fully pecked (infilled).

Associated stone arrangements are located within the women's ceremonial area along the next sandstone terrace south of the engraving of the woman. From west to east the first stone arrangement consists of a circle of medium-sized sandstone boulders, approximately 4.8 metres (16 ft) in diameter. A single sandstone boulder stands in the centre of the circle which is clear of all vegetation excepting leaf litter.

From this stone arrangement a clear path runs east along the sandstone terrace with irregularly spaced marker boulders of similar size and appearance to the circle stones. Approximately 70 metres (230 ft) from the stone circle are two standing stones approximately 10 metres (33 ft) apart. These stones are flat (approximately 10–15 centimetres (3.9–5.9 in) deep), roughly triangular in shape and have been placed upright, set in the soil.

Approximately 70 metres (230 ft) further east of the two standing stones is another stone arrangement on a large flat, sandstone outcropping, almost directly below the engraving of the woman. On top of this outcropping is a series of medium-sized sandstone boulders. Again, these boulders are conspicuously angular and of slightly different composition to the underlying outcrop. The boulders form a rough circle approximately 2–3 metres (6 ft 7 in – 9 ft 10 in) in diameter, however, they appear to be in slight disarray and heavy leaf litter and vegetation partially obscures them.

Further features and details of the women's ceremonial area on the northern ridgeline are not able to be publicly shared out of respect for cultural and gendered sensitivities.

The eastern ridgeline of the amphitheatre is heavily inscribed with motifs related to Daramulan. A set of three engravings includes a profile emu with a three-toed foot and large protruding chest, interpreted as Daramulan in emu form, a prostrate male human figure shown pointing west with a small bandicoot alongside interpreted as a "guide", and a one-legged human figure shown holding a large ovoid shape, interpreted as Daramulan using what may be a bullroarer.

There are visual, physical and symbolic links known to be intact between individual sites across the Calga ACL. For example, the rare engraving of the prostrate woman on the northern ridge is visually and symbolically connected to the engraving of a profile pregnant woman located on a high sandstone platform approximately 700 metres (2,300 ft) to its south east, in the Peats Ridge Road reserve. The pecked engraving depicts a pregnant woman in profile, alongside a small macropod-like figure and several unidentified circular shapes. The figure is recognised by Aboriginal people as a direction signal by its orientation and profile presentation. The profile pregnant woman engraving is also symbolically linked to an engraving site in the southern portion of the site which depicts a similar macropod-like figure.

The landscape is transected by an electrical line easement. Although clearing and earthworks associated with these works and earlier agricultural works may have impacted on natural features, art and/or archaeological deposits no specific instances of this have been identified. It is not considered that these works have severed visual or symbolic connections across the natural amphitheatre or present a significant obstacle to ongoing work to investigate and interpret the traditional use and meaning of the landscape.

=== Archaeological potential ===
The following predictive modelling of archaeological potential is excerpted from GML 2016:

- Engraved art sites may be found on any flat sandstone platform, with suitable quality rock, especially on the extended and raised terraces associated with the northern and southern ridgelines between the 180-and-220-metre (590 and 720 ft) contours. These sites may be buried by soil and leaf accumulation and therefore not visible. These sites may also need to be recorded at night, when visibility of shallow engravings is maximised by oblique light. Certain engraved art sites may contain images of Aboriginal ancestral beings connected with ceremony or tradition. These need to be recorded and categorised separately to other types of engraving sites. Particular attention should be made to the aesthetic and visual links associated with such sites.
- Pigmented art sites may be found in any larger shelter with suitable sandstone outcropping, particularly in association with the steeper inclined upper slopes of the north and south ridgelines.
- Rockshelters are likely to be found in areas with steeply benched sandstone terraces, most commonly between the 100m-200m contour. The median elevation for 224 recorded shelters within a 5 kilometres (3.1 mi) radius of Calga Women's Site is 145 metres (476 ft). Shelters have the potential to contain deeply stratified, undisturbed archaeological deposits which have a high level of research potential due to their intactness and integrity of the archaeological deposits which could contain datable evidence of ancient Aboriginal occupation.
- The recording of engraved and pigmented art sites also needs to include description of and consideration for the surrounding landscape connection, including near and distant views to and from the sites. View sheds may provide an indication of locations with further art sites;
- Access (walking) routes between art sites need to be considered and recorded. Access routes are likely to have been associated with terraces on similar contour lines to that on which the art site is located. Certain landforms on access routes may contain archaeological deposits connected with traditional use-in some instances these deposits could be stratified;
- Standing stones may be found in connection with terraces and walking routes between the engraved art sites.
- Stone circles may be found on the terraces between the engraved art sites. The orientation of stones needs to be recorded and connected with other site types, especially engraving sites, visible landscape features and celestial movements.
- Grinding grooves are likely to be found in and adjacent to the creek corridors on exposed sandstone bedrock platforms. These sites may have been buried by recent soil accumulation. Regionally, grinding grooves have also been recorded at a distance from water, in connection with water holes and engraved art sites on elevated platforms.
- Concentrations of artefacts may be found on the terraces below engraving sites, close to water, where soil has accumulated, on flat or gently sloping landforms which are large enough to accommodate a moderately sized family group. Given the colluvial and fluvial erosional processes at work in this area, these sites within the bowl of the gully could be stratified and a considerable depth of archaeological deposit may be present. It is likely that the stratigraphic integrity and research value of such open sites is likely to be lower than closed sites such as shelter deposits. These deposits may be associated with Aboriginal habitation activities and could include evidence for hearth and ground ovens, used for cooking.

== Heritage listing ==
As at 2 October 2019, The Calga Aboriginal Cultural Landscape is of State heritage significance as a symbolic and ritualised cultural landscape comprised within a natural sandstone amphitheatre formed around a gully. The semicircular topography of the amphitheatre provides natural resources, amenity and seclusion for cultural practice and its shape is recognised by Aboriginal women to represent a womb.

The landscape is associated with Dreaming stories and belief systems of Baiame, Bootha and Daramulan, who are recognised by Aboriginal people across much of south eastern Australia as the all-father who came from the sky and the mother and son who created the earth and other beings and passed down sacred law to Aboriginal people. Of great spiritual significance, a concentration of engravings depicting these entities in both human and anthropomorphic forms demonstrate to Aboriginal people that the site is the highly sacred place where Daramulan came into being. Located along the Peats Ridge songline, the Calga Aboriginal Cultural Landscape is connected both spatially and symbolically with other key sites which have established associations with these creation beings including Mooney Mooney, Baiame Cave and Mt Yengo.

The landscape is made up of layers of interconnected journey and directional markers which are individually significant, but when read or interpreted together in their traditional context, convey rich information about cultural practice including boundaries of initiated or gendered authorization for particular areas and instructions for ritual practice and ceremony related to stories, songs and dances. These markers include paths provided by the sloped and terraced topography, views from prominent landmarks, water sources, significant trees and vegetation, rock engravings, stone arrangements and pigment art. Some of the engraved motifs associated with sacred women's business are exceptionally rare and one example with associated stone arrangements may be totally unique. There is high potential for further archaeological and anthropological insights to be gained from further survey and investigation of the terrain.

Aboriginal women view the place as an important link to their female ancestors and key resource for teaching of future generations of Aboriginal girls and women about their culture and spirituality. Although much of the symbolism of the engravings, stone arrangements, landforms and vegetation on the northern high sandstone terraces have been identified as being associated with sacred women's business, other areas are inscribed with meaning of particular importance to Aboriginal men. Other parts of the site, particularly the southern rock shelters and sloping terrain at the base of the gully, are able to sustain and accommodate mixed domestic groups while ceremony is undertaken on the northern ridgeline.

The 2015 judgement of the Land and Environment Court, based largely on evidence given by Aboriginal women, is regarded as an historic landmark precedent in the way that Aboriginal cultural landscapes with tangible and intangible values are recognised and protected in law.

Efforts to recognise and protect the cultural landscape over a decade have served to unite Aboriginal communities from previously disparate and geographically distant groups. The community associates the womb-shaped place with cultural genesis and spiritual nourishment. This recent strengthening of ties and sharing of cultural knowledge has enabled deeper understandings and reconnection, particularly for Aboriginal women, with the landscape, and their culture. The Calga Aboriginal Cultural Landscape is of exceptional social and spiritual state heritage significance as it demonstrates the continuation of Aboriginal living culture and beliefs.

Calga Aboriginal Cultural Landscape was listed on the New South Wales State Heritage Register on 1 October 2019 having satisfied the following criteria.

The place is important in demonstrating the course, or pattern, of cultural or natural history in New South Wales.

The site is of state historical significance as its location on Peats Ridge tells the story of an important traditional songline. The location on an ancient pathway demonstrates the historical movement of Aboriginal people between the Sydney Basin, the Hunter Valley and beyond over thousands of years for diverse purposes including trade and social and cultural practice.

The position on the songline and assemblage of creator being motifs depicted in art across the site demonstrates historical and ongoing connections of both a spatial and symbolic nature to other key sites such as Mount Yengo and Biame Cave (SHR01942) which share established cultural associations with creator beings such as Baiame, Bootha and Daramulan (the ancestral all-father, mother and son who created the earth during the Dreaming).

The site is of historic state significance as a key place along the songline which tells the story of the earths' creation, the coming into being of Daramulan and the handing down of Aboriginal lore to Aboriginal people over generations. The songline, related belief system and traditional handing down of Aboriginal lore continues as part of a living culture.

Individual spaces and features within the site provide historical evidence of the cultural life and traditional practices of Aboriginal people past and present, notably of women's sacred ceremony, but also of the early stages of men's initiation when boys are handed over by their mothers to become men. The complex cultural landscape, comprising land form, topography, natural resources, art, ceremonial stone arrangements and significant viewsheds, reinforced by traditional belief and knowledge, are of state level significance for their ability to communicate the traditional cultural practices and ceremony which have been historically undertaken by Aboriginal people, particularly women.

The site is also of historic significance as the subject of a landmark Land and Environment Court judgement which recognised the significance of an Aboriginal cultural landscape. This decision recognised in law, for what appears to be the first time, the interconnectedness and inextricable significance of networks of individual Aboriginal sites and intangible values as intrinsically connected components of a single cultural landscape, rather than isolated physical objects or artefacts.

The place has a strong or special association with a person, or group of persons, of importance of cultural or natural history of New South Wales's history.

The site is associated with Aboriginal people past and present, in particular the Darkinjung and Guringai Aboriginal peoples, for whom it has profound cultural and spiritual meaning. Aboriginal peoples' experience of this landscape has traditionally been guided by culturally symbolic markers including topography, natural resources, rock and pigment art and stone arrangements which can be interpreted to communicate directions, boundaries, required ritual practices and/or stories.

The site is also significant at a state level for its particular association with Aboriginal women past and present. The shape of the landform and associated views, vegetation, iconography of engravings and associated series of stone arrangements on the northern ridgeline of the natural amphitheatre indicate that it is an area of women's ceremonial business. This is reinforced by traditional stories and beliefs. As such, the tangible and intangible values of the cultural landscape provide a unique and rich window into the traditional practice and instruction of sacred women's business.

The full significance of the association with Aboriginal women is not able to be articulated in detail due to cultural and gender sensitivities.

The place is important in demonstrating aesthetic characteristics and/or a high degree of creative or technical achievement in New South Wales.

The site is of state aesthetic significance as a ritualised cultural landscape comprised within a largely intact gully. It demonstrates distinctive aesthetic attributes in form and composition, with natural and cultural features across the landscape which are imbued with both practical and intangible meanings.

The semicircular topography of the amphitheatre provides resources, amenity and seclusion for cultural practice and its shape is recognised by Aboriginal women to represent a womb. The shape reflects cultural knowledge of the site as the birthplace of Daramulan and the traditional practices that occur there, proving symbolic and physical protection and sustenance. The orientation of the womb-shaped amphitheatre to the west and its spatial relationship in the broader regional cultural landscape further emphasise its connection to far reaching Aboriginal people and countries via the songline travelled by creation beings. The topography provides natural pathways to facilitate traditional practice and key high points which allow for important viewsheds across and within the natural amphitheatre and beyond it to other related landscapes.

Historic archaeological investigations have focused mostly on the high sandstone ridgelines, revealing a significant concentration of rock engravings along these high points. The motifs of this engraved art are directly linked with Dreaming stories and belief systems which are commonly held across south eastern Australia, particularly concerning creation beings or culture heroes Baiame, Bootha and Daramulan.

Within the women's ceremonial area on the northern ridge, the engraving of the female figure is of state heritage significance. Its state heritage significance is established through its larger than life size, detailing and association with the large emu and footprint engravings which indicate that it is a depiction of ancestral creation deity Bootha, the wife of Baiame. The motif and detailing of this engraving relates to ceremonial practice and cannot be made public due to gendered cultural sensitivities. The adjacent engraving of a footprint is identified to have been made by Baiame and the engraved emu figure is recognised as Daramulan by its large size and detailing. The location of these engravings on a secluded platform and their proximity to ceremonial stone arrangements also contributes to the aesthetic state heritage significance of the site.

There is a heavy concentration of motifs related to Daramulan in the eastern portion of the site of state heritage significance. The profile emu with a three-toed foot and large protruding chest is interpreted as Daramulan in emu form. tTe prostrate male human figure shown pointing west with a small bandicoot alongside is interpreted as a "guide" pointing the way to men's ceremonial grounds further along the songline. The one-legged human figure is interpreted as Daramulan using his bullroarer to call the mothers to bring their sons to him to be initiated and learn the Law that Bootha had given him.

In addition to rock art, the landscape is heavily inscribed with other culturally symbolic markers including water sources, significance trees and vegetation, stone arrangements, pigment art, etc. Whilst individually significant, when read together these markers communicate complex messages about cultural practice including (but not limited to) ritualised movement through country, the transmission of cultural knowledge, use of trade routes and practice of ceremony. The visual, spatial and symbolic links between these sites are substantially intact.

The place has a strong or special association with a particular community or cultural group in New South Wales for social, cultural or spiritual reasons.

The Calga Aboriginal Cultural Landscape is of exceptional state social significance to Aboriginal people, particularly the Darkinjung and Guringai peoples, for whom it is imbued with social, cultural and spiritual meaning.

The site is of state level spiritual significance as it is central to the ongoing belief systems of Aboriginal people of eastern Australia, particularly the Darkinjung and Guringai people. It is a key place along the songline believed to be created by the travels of creation beings, Baiame, Bootha and Daramulan. It is an important part of the sacred story of the earths' creation, including the coming into being of Daramulan and the handing down of Aboriginal lore to Aboriginal people over generations.

Much of the symbolism of the engravings, stone arrangements, landforms and vegetation of the site has been identified as being associated with secret women's business. This is of social significance at a state level for Aboriginal women. For Aboriginal people of south east Australia gendered cultural divisions traditionally pervade broad areas of community life ranging from practical hunting and fishing practices to spiritual matters, according to cultural law. A major tenant of cultural law is the obligation to care for country, and Aboriginal women express an enduring strong spiritual obligation to care for the Calga Aboriginal Cultural Landscape in perpetuity and pass on cultural knowledge with regard to it.

The fight for the site's protection over the past decade has united the Aboriginal community across previously disparate groups. These strengthened ties have allowed for deeper understandings and reconnection with the landscape from which the community had been previously physically displaced.

Community efforts in coming together to combine their collective cultural knowledge to interpret the site demonstrates a strong sense of connection and value. Acting as a catalyst for bringing together people who hold different pieces of the site's story and meaning, the fight to protect it reflects an important community effort to address the cultural dislocation of colonisation. It also reflects the ongoing traditional system of gradual initiation and transmission of cultural knowledge within Aboriginal communities, whereby different individuals are charged with different components of cultural law/lore (based on factors including age, gender, level of initiation, role within the clan group, etc.). In this way the site is inextricably linked with the identity of past and present Aboriginal people.

The site is also of state social significance in light of the 2015 Land and Environment Court Judgement which recognised its importance to Aboriginal people as a cultural landscape. Uniting around a common cause was a significant moment for many Aboriginal women involved in the appeal against the mine extension not only as a confirmation of their Aboriginality but also of their identity and value and right to be heard specifically as Aboriginal women. This grassroots movement on the Central Coast was documented in local newspapers over several years and has had a lasting impact on community, particularly the community of Aboriginal women.

Aboriginal people from across and beyond New South Wales have demonstrated their connection to the Calga Aboriginal Cultural Landscape via shared sacred stories, cultural law and practices. These far reaching groups have further demonstrated the cultural significance of the site by emphasising their feeling of cultural obligation as Aboriginal people to care for this significant piece of country.

The site is of social significance as a key educational resource for Aboriginal women to teach girls about sacred women's business.

The place has potential to yield information that will contribute to an understanding of the cultural or natural history of New South Wales.

The site is of state level scientific significance for its research potential. Its research potential has been well documented by numerous expert cultural heritage practitioners and, notably, the 2015 Land and Environment Court judgement relating to land within the proposed curtilage. Considering the intactness of the cultural landscape this site may provide evidence of Darkinjung and Guringai cultures that is unavailable elsewhere.

It encompasses an area of archaeological potential for rock engravings especially on extended and raised terraces between the 180-and-220-metre (590 and 720 ft) contours, for rockshelters with associated occupation deposits between the 100–200-metre (330–660 ft) contours and for artefact scatters, open camp sites, middens and grinding grooves within the bowl of the gully and along the water source.

The site contains a large assemblage of rock art which remains yet to be fully recorded or interpreted. Together with stone arrangements and natural features this assemblage provides significant anthropological research potential for understanding Aboriginal cultural landscapes more broadly. It has the potential to further understandings of the Sydney Basin Aboriginal rock art tradition, including the role of symbolic graphic language in the social, ritual and economic spheres of traditional Aboriginal culture. The court specifically noted the great potential for additional rock art sites relating to creation beings within the cultural landscape considering the remoteness and inaccessibility of parts of the topography.

There is also potential for stratified sub-surface archaeological deposits which could contribute to the understanding of how groups lived during times of ceremony and of broader occupation patterns across south-eastern Australia. Further research could also contribute to understandings about the major travel route or songline of Peats Ridge, regional links and the way in which the landscape was traditionally managed and traversed.

The place possesses uncommon, rare or endangered aspects of the cultural or natural history of New South Wales.

The site is of state significance as it includes a large assemblage of Aboriginal rock engraving sites depicting exceptionally rare iconography concerning creation beings such as Baiame, Bootha and Daramulan.

One rare rock art motif present within the women's ceremonial area has been determined by archaeologist Jo McDonald to be found in only 1% of rock art sites in the Sydney basin. It has also been determined that the particular detail to this rare motif, which reflects traditional ceremonial practice, may be completely unique.

Rock art with associated stone arrangements, as seen at the site, has been determined by Jo McDonald to be found in 0.6% of rock art sites in the Sydney basin.

The intactness of the amphitheatre is rare in metropolitan NSW. It, and the symbolic and tangible connections between the individual sites and its depictions of the creation beings has allowed the Aboriginal community a unique opportunity to interpret the meaning inscribed on this landscape, reconnecting intangible Dreaming stories and belief systems with the tangible environment and former ritual practices. Further investigation of the site has the potential to provide further in-depth understandings of how Aboriginal people, and especially Aboriginal women, engaged with and derived meaning from the landscape. The importance of this anthropological potential is heightened by its richness and rarity, considering that historically, anthropological documentation of Aboriginal cultural practice has been dominated by a focus on men's ceremony.

The place is important in demonstrating the principal characteristics of a class of cultural or natural places/environments in New South Wales.

The site is of representative significance at a state level as a fine example of an Aboriginal cultural landscape comprised within a relatively undisturbed natural amphitheatre.

The visual, spatial and symbolic relationships between individual sites is representative of Aboriginal cultural landscapes across the state, but are unique in terms of their intactness and well-documented interconnectedness.

The way in which the landscape has been inscribed with symbolic ritual meaning is reflective of Aboriginal spirituality and common belief systems about country and the Dreaming.

The site's location on Peats Ridge may be of state significance as a visible example of the routes and pathways known as songlines that were utilised throughout New South Wales and Australia by Aboriginal people over thousands of years.

The depiction of creation beings such as Baiame, Daramulan and Bootha is representative of deities common to Aboriginal people of south-eastern Australia.

Whilst the method and style of the engravings across the site are typical of Aboriginal engravings in the Sydney basin the particular motifs and symbolism are noted to be very rare.
