= Australian Cornish Mining Sites =

- Interactive map of Australian Cornish Mining Sites
- 33°40′47″S 138°55′03″E and 34°04′32″S 137°36′31″E
- Type: Mining site
- Location: Burra and Moonta

Site notes
- Governing body: Government of Australia

Australian National Heritage List
- Designated: 9 May 2017
- Reference no.
- Region: South Australia

The Australian Cornish Mining Sites are historic sites in South Australia listed jointly on the Australian National Heritage List. There are two distinct sites – Burra in the mid-north of the state and Moonta Mines in the northern Yorke Peninsula region. The heritage value of both sites relates to their history as mines worked by migrant miners from Cornwall. The sites were inscribed on the Australian National Heritage List on 9 May 2017.

== Background ==
In 1841, copper deposits were discovered in Kapunda and Burra, though mining only began in 1844 and 1845 respectively. By 1850 the region would become the third largest copper producer in the world. Settlers were drawn to Southern Australia to take part in the great copper boom, including Cornish miners and their families.

In 1859, traces of copper were discovered in South Australia's Yorke peninsula and mines were quickly established in Moonta, Kadina, and Wallaroo. The area bordered by these towns became known as the Copper Triangle due to the large amount of copper discovered. These mines would produce around 350,000 tonnes of copper – an amount nearly half the total mineral production of South Australia until 1924.

== Cornish influence ==
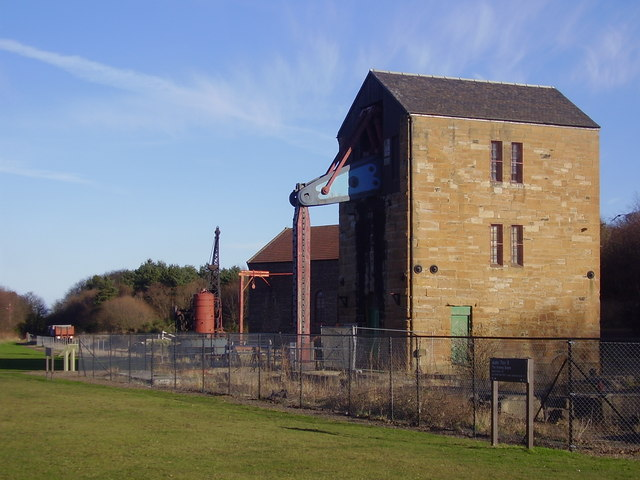
Cornish Beam Engine

The Cornish settler had a large influence on the development of the Yorke peninsula and was a major factor in the inclusion of the Moonta and Burra mines in the National Heritage list. In the 1840s, Cornwall suffered a tremendous impact due to the potato blight which led to a significant proportion of the Cornish population traveling overseas to seek employment as a way to avoid the famine. During the 1860s to 1870s, Cornwall began to de-industrialize as the over-specialized economy failed to diversify. The discovery of copper in the Yorke peninsula saw many Cornish miners and their families to emigrate as they found themselves unemployed in Cornwall.

Cornish migrants and their families would settle near the mines due to their interest in the copper boom. The settlers would apply their methods in construction, design, labour and mining to their work. Cornish miners imported their own equipment, such as the Cornish beam engine, and other materials to aid in the development of the mines. Cornish engine-houses dominated the landscape surrounding the mines, pumping water found in the mines to the surface. The Cornish steam engine was revolutionary when introduced in Australia during the mid-19th century as it enabled mining of metals at depths previously unreachable. The techniques Cornish miners had developed over generations suited the conditions needed to mine copper, as skillset missing in Australia till their arrival.

The expertise and advanced machinery brought by the Cornish settlers allowed the Copper Triangle to flourish. By 1865, it was thought that Cornish settlers made up more than 42% of South Australia's immigrant population. The Yorke peninsula became known as Australia's Little Cornwall due to the large Cornish population in the region. The Yorke peninsula became known as Australia's Little Cornwall due to the large Cornish population in the region. The mining communities in South Australia became distinctly Cornish in culture. Cornish migrants brought their dialect, Methodist faith, and other Cornish practices after emigrating to the region. The operations of mining sites, particularly in Moonta and Burra, was overwhelmingly Cornish in nature, with mining terminology and practices bearing a strong resemblance to that of Cornwall. Managers at the mining sites who held authority in both mining operations and within the broader society, such as Henry Richard Hancock, achieved a mythic status amongst residents; a social structure that was directly inherited from Cornwall. The culture of the Cornish immigrants would change overtime as the idea of belonging shifted from Cornwall to the mining communities they lived in, though still retaining their cultural roots. During the measles epidemic in Moonta Mines, Cornish immigrants banded together in opposition of government intervention in the region due to a localized anti-metropolitanism, a result of the hybridization of both Cornish influence and the cultural identity developed by the immigrants of the Moonta region. During the miner strikes that occurred in 1848 at Burra, fellow miners at Kapunda, many of which were Cornish in origin, had prepared to send monetary funds as a sign of their unity to their "brethren" in Burra. A festival known as Kernewek Lowender (Cornish for "Cornish Happiness") is held every year to celebrate the region's ties to Cornwall. Today, around 10% of South Australians are of Cornish descent.

== Moonta mine ==
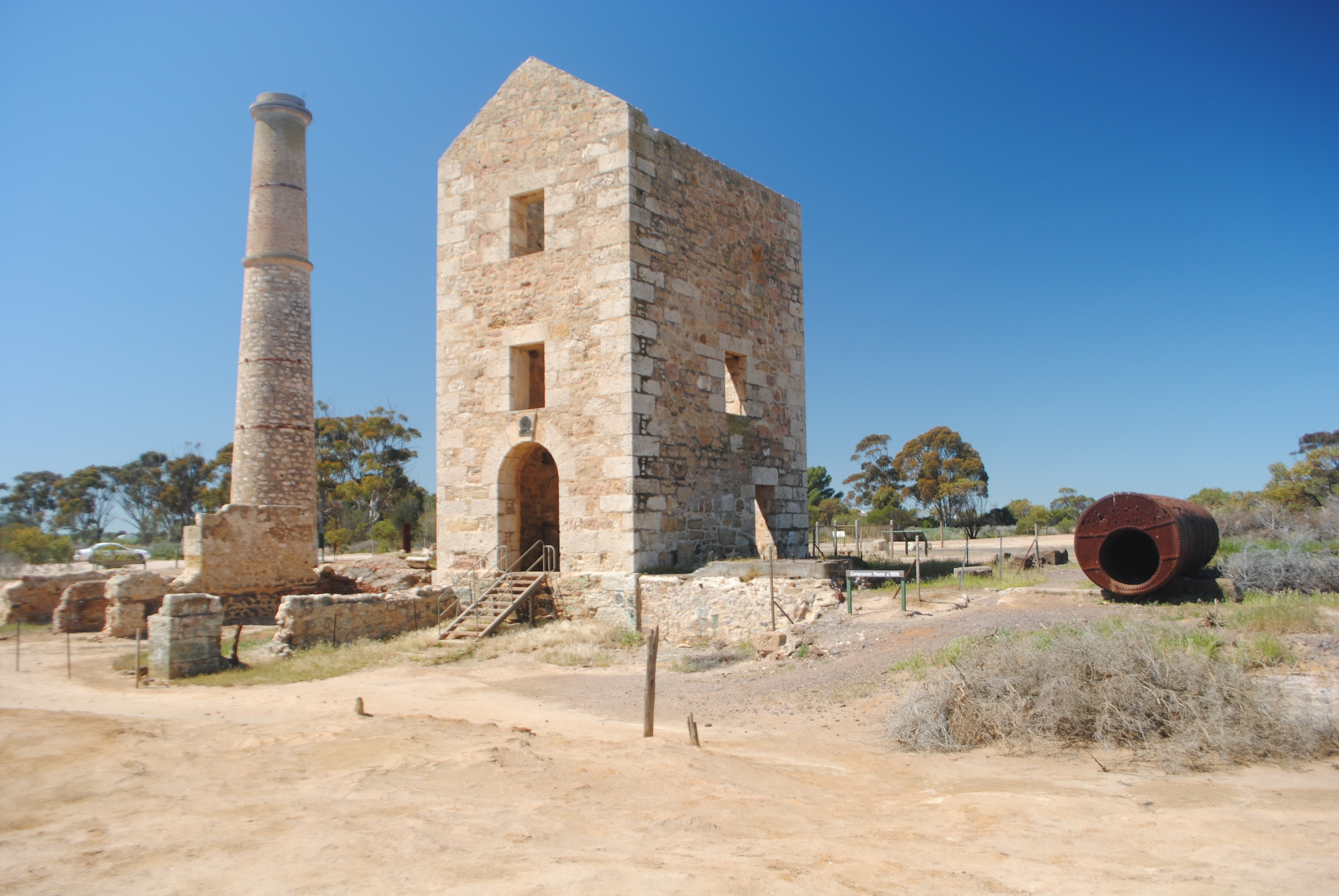
Moonta Mines Hughes' Enginehouse

Moonta was South Australia's largest mining enterprise during Australia's colonial period. It is located in the upper Yorke Peninsula, 165 km north west of Adelaide. The state heritage area covers most of the former Moonta Mining Company lease, including the main mining, industrial, and residential components of Moonta Mines and Yelta. The Moonta Mines opened in 1861, providing a boost to South Australia's economy during a time of poor crop yields. In the span of nine years, the population of Moonta Mines increased from an initial four men to a community of more than 10,000. By 1870, Moonta held the second largest urban population behind Adelaide.

Due the rapid increase in population relevant infrastructure such as dwellings and sewage were poorly planned or non-existent, resulting in cramped conditions, lack of infrastructure, and unsanitary conditions. Furthermore, as the region lacked sources of fresh water, the cost of water was high due to water either being transported into the area via cart or pumped and distilled from highly mineralized water sources found in the mine shafts. The Moonta Mining Company, who at the time were managing the mines, were unable to keep up with the demand for water in the community. The community developed alternative methods to supply themselves with water, such as making underground tanks which collected surface water during rainfall. This, however, led the community to become increasingly susceptible to disease as the ground surface of Moonta Mines was a toxic mix of contaminants and sewage. The water tanks quickly became polluted and were breeding grounds for malign bacteria. As a result of these poor conditions, epidemics ran rampant in the Moonta area during the mine's early days.

In 1874, Moonta faced a measles epidemic which had a significant impact on the mining settlements. The spread of measles to the Moonta district was first reported by Northern Argus on 20 October 1874. By December of the same year, an estimated 2,400 cases of measles had been reported with an average of five to six daily deaths, the majority of the victims being infants and children. Death certificates and contemporary newspapers clarified that these deaths were not solely due to measles but also a result of commonplace illnesses such as dysentery and diarrhoea. Moonta Mine was particularly affected by these illnesses due to the unsanitary conditions and impure drinking water in the community. The Central Board of Health, a government body established to improve and protect public health in South Australian government townships, issued a decree on 21 December 1874 that the mineral leases would come under its control so that they may intervene in the sanitary affairs of the mines.

Until the 1890s, all work undertaken in the Moonta mine was carried out through manual labour. An estimated 80 miles (130 km) of shaft and levels were constructed inside the mining area. To travel between levels, step ladders were installed in shafts that went as deep as 750 metres (2,460 ft). Ore was hauled to the surface using horse whims, a machine powered by a horse using a system of pulleys and cables, and engine houses pumped water from the mine. The mine was managed for 34 years by Mine Captain Henry Richard Hancock, who worked to better the living conditions for the workers and their families, such as through the establishment of an adequate minimum wage and compulsory night school for the boys who worked at the mine's sorting tables.

In its first year, Moonta mines produced nearly 5,000 tons of ore, worth more than 67,000 British pounds. By 1875, Moonta mine had surpassed Cornwall as the British Empire's largest copper region. The mine was the first in Australia to pay one million pounds in dividends. The Moonta company produced more than $10 million worth of copper. At its peak, the mines employed more than 1,700 workers. Profits from the mine would be reinvested in South Australia.

== Burra mine ==
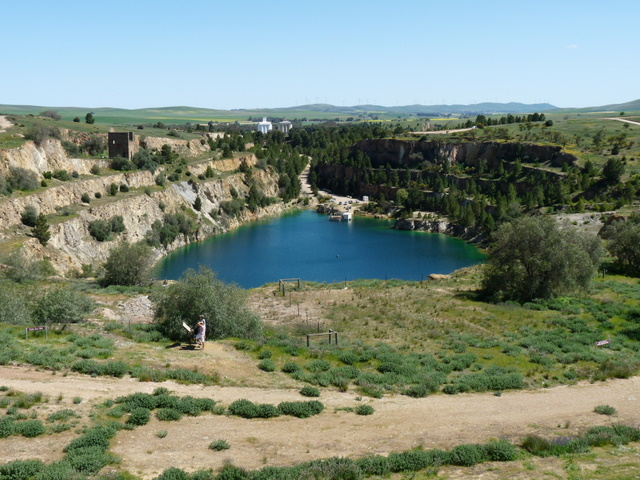
Burra Mine Site

The Burra mine, also known as Burra Burra copper mine or Burra's "monster mine", was discovered in 1845 and would be the largest mine in Australia for the first 10 years after its discovery. The mine was owned by Henry Ayers, secretary of the South Australian Mining Association (SAMA). SAMA sought to obtain the expertise brought by Cornish workers, recruiting Cornish miners and adopting their technology and mining methods to aid in the development of the mine. From 1850 to 1860 the mine produced five percent of the world's copper. In 1895 at the peak of its production the mine employed more than 1200 workers.

Located 160 km north-east of Adelaide along the Barrier Highway, Burra was the largest inland settlement by 1850. The Burra mines and associated buildings are the earliest examples of Cornish mining and domestic architecture in Australia.

In September 1848, miners began strikes challenging Henry Ayers and SAMA after SAMA superintendent, Thomas Burr, was dismissed after continuous discrepancies regarding assays of copper ore samples provided by the miners were found to be over-estimated. These strikes were in opposition to evaluation of the assays as well as other monetary related pressures, such as the deduction of club and doctor fund as well as high charges for necessary equipment for mining operations. With the intervention of G. S. Dashwood, the Commissioner of Police dispatched to the mines after reports of the strike was release, SAMA and the miners began negotiation, the results of which favoured the miners.

Due to the dislocation and upheavals occurring in Europe in 1848 the world price of copper fell. On 20 September 1848, Henry Ayers sought to cut expenditure of the Burra mine by announcing a general cut in wages for labourers, blacksmiths, and other workers who operated on the surface; otherwise known as grass workers, after having reached an agreement with the miners. The miners began to strike once again in consideration of their fellow workers, demanding the restoration of existing rates of pay for all workers of the mine. SAMA did not negotiate with this second strike and the strike was broken by desperate miners persuaded to return to work.

== National heritage listing ==
The addition of the Burra and Moonta mining sites to the National Heritage list on 9 May 2017 was due to their demonstration of Cornish mining technology, skills and culture. The cultural value of these sites was due to the historical significance of the mines and the large influence the Cornish miners, engineers, and tradespeople played in the development of what would be a major economic source for Australia.
