= Old High Court Building, Melbourne =

Former courthouse in Melbourne, Australia

Old High Court Building
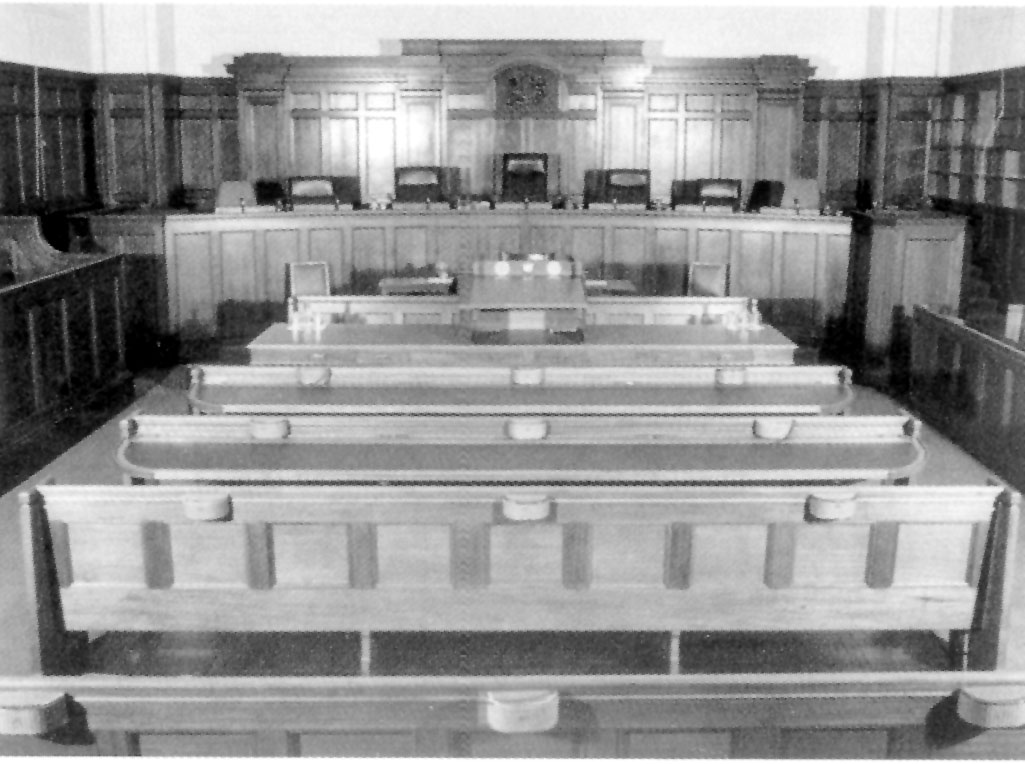
- The court house interior

- Location within Melbourne
- Interactive map of the Old High Court Building area

General information
- Type: Court house
- Location: Melbourne, Victoria, Australia, 450 Little Bourke Street
- Coordinates: 37°48′51″S 144°57′33″E

The Old High Court Building is a building that formerly housed the High Court of Australia, when resident in Melbourne, in a building located at 450 Little Bourke Street, Melbourne, in Victoria, Australia. The High Court sat at the building from 1928 to 1980, and it was the location of its registry from 1928 to 1973.

The building was added to the National Heritage List on 11 July 2007; the Victorian branch of the National Trust also added the building to a non-statutory heritage list; and on 22 June 1993 the building was added to the now defunct Register of the National Estate.

== History ==
Significant cases heard at the old High Court Building include:

- the Bank Nationalisation Case in 1948
- the Communist Party Case in 1951
