= National Heritage List (Australia) =

National heritage register of Australia

Australian National Heritage List
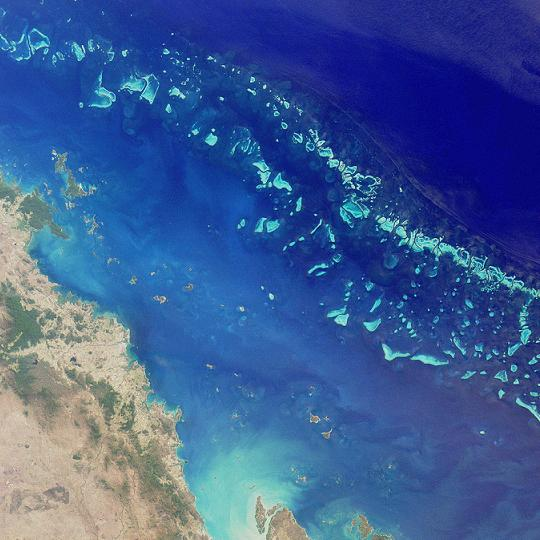
- Satellite image of part of the Great Barrier Reef adjacent to the Queensland coastal areas of Airlie Beach and Mackay.
- Type: Heritage register of natural, historic and indigenous places that are not owned by the Commonwealth of Australia
- Country: Australia
- Years: 2003–present
- Preceded by: Register of the National Estate
- Compiled by: Commonwealth of Australia via the Australian Heritage Council
- Approved by: Minister for the Environment

The Australian National Heritage List or National Heritage List (NHL) is a heritage register, a list of national heritage places deemed to be of outstanding heritage significance to Australia, established in 2003. The list includes natural and historic places, including those of cultural significance to Indigenous Australians such as Aboriginal Australian sacred sites. Having been assessed against a set list of criteria, once a place is put on the National Heritage List, the provisions of the Environment Protection and Biodiversity Conservation Act 1999 (EPBC Act) apply.

All places on this list can be found on the online Australian Heritage Database, along with other places on other Australian and world heritage listings.

== History ==
The National Heritage List was established in 2003 by an amendment to the Environment Protection and Biodiversity Conservation Act 1999.

The National Heritage List, together with the Commonwealth Heritage List, replaced the former Register of the National Estate, which was closed and archived in 2007. Places on the National Heritage List are places of outstanding heritage value for Australia, while the Commonwealth Heritage List are heritage places that are owned or controlled by the Commonwealth of Australia.

== Criteria for listing ==
The National Heritage List is a list of places deemed to be of outstanding heritage significance to Australia. Once on the list, the provisions of the EPBC Act apply. To be included on the list, a nominated place is assessed by the Australian Heritage Council against nine criteria:

- importance in the course, or pattern, of Australia's natural or cultural history
- possession of uncommon, rare or endangered aspects of Australia's natural or cultural history
- potential to yield information that will contribute to an understanding of Australia's natural or cultural history
- importance in demonstrating the principal characteristics of a class of Australia's natural or cultural places or environments
- importance in exhibiting particular aesthetic characteristics valued by a community or cultural group
- importance in demonstrating a high degree of creative or technical achievement at a particular period
- strong or special association with a particular community or cultural group for social, cultural or spiritual reasons
- special association with the life or works of a person, or group of persons, of importance in Australia's natural or cultural history
- importance as part of Indigenous tradition.

In addition, the place must pass a "significance threshold"; it must have 'outstanding' heritage value to the nation as a whole. This is determined by comparison to other similar places. Once the Heritage Council has made an assessment, it forwards a recommendation to the Minister for the Environment, who shall make a determination.

== Composition ==
As of 10 August 2020, the Australian National Heritage List comprised 120 heritage places as follows:

State/territory	Number of places
Australian Capital Territory	5
New South Wales	36
Northern Territory	4
Queensland	13
South Australia	8
Tasmania	11
Victoria	32
Western Australia	15
Other territories	3
(duplicates):	(4) (Note: The following historic resources are included within multiple state lists: Australian Alps (ACT, NSW, Victoria); Gondwana Rainforests – Focal Peak Group (NSW and Qld); Gondwana Rainforests – Main Range National Park (NSW and Qld); Gondwana Rainforests – Shield Volcano Group (NSW and Qld); Australian Convict Sites (New South Wales, Tasmania, Western Australia))
Total:	120

== List ==
The Australian National Heritage List comprises these sites:

#	Image	Listed place	State	Date listed	Coordinates	Notes
1		Abbotsford Convent (listing)	Victoria	31 August 2017	37°48′09″S 145°00′14″E	
2		Adelaide Park Lands and City Layout (listing)	South Australia	7 November 2008	34°56′05″S 138°37′00″E	
3		Australian Academy of Science Building (listing)	Australian Capital Territory	21 November 2005	35°17′01.2″S 149°07′21.4″E	
4		Australian Alps National Parks and Reserves – Alpine National Park (listing)	Victoria	7 November 2008	36°29′59″S 148°03′50″E	
4		Australian Alps National Parks and Reserves – Avon Wilderness (listing)	Victoria	7 November 2008	37°36′45″S 146°50′34″E	
4		Australian Alps National Parks and Reserves – Baw Baw National Park (listing)	Victoria	7 November 2008	37°45′50″S 146°13′23″E	
4		Australian Alps National Parks and Reserves – Bimberi Nature Reserve (listing)	New South Wales	7 November 2008	35°34′54″S 148°45′04″E	
4		Australian Alps National Parks and Reserves – Brindabella National Park (listing)	New South Wales	7 November 2008	35°13′54″S 148°46′44″E	
4		Australian Alps National Parks and Reserves – Kosciuszko National Park (listing)	New South Wales	7 November 2008	36°04′20″S 148°20′55″E	
4		Australian Alps National Parks and Reserves – Mount Buffalo National Park (listing)	Victoria	7 November 2008	36°44′18″S 146°46′30″E	
4		Australian Alps National Parks and Reserves – Namadgi National Park (listing)	Australian Capital Territory	7 November 2008	35°40′00″S 148°57′00″E	
4		Australian Alps National Parks and Reserves – Scabby Range Nature Reserve (listing)	New South Wales	7 November 2008	35°45′55″S 148°52′04″E	
4		Australian Alps National Parks and Reserves – Snowy River National Park (listing)	Victoria	7 November 2008	37°16′30″S 148°33′12″E	
4		Australian Alps National Parks and Reserves – Tidbinbilla Nature Reserve (listing)	Australian Capital Territory	7 November 2008	35°27′47″S 148°54′38″E	
5		Australian Convict Sites – Brickendon Estate (listing)	Tasmania	23 June 2007	41°37′01″S 147°07′39″E	World Heritage Site 2010
5		Australian Convict Sites – Cascades Female Factory and Yard 4 North (listing)	Tasmania	1 August 2007^{[B]}	42°53′37″S 147°17′57″E	World Heritage Site 2010
5		Australian Convict Sites – Coal Mines Historic Site (listing)	Tasmania	1 August 2007	42°59′01″S 147°42′59″E	World Heritage Site 2010
5		Australian Convict Sites – Cockatoo Island (listing)	New South Wales	1 August 2007	33°50′49″S 151°10′16″E	World Heritage Site 2010
5		Australian Convict Sites – Darlington Probation Station (listing)	Tasmania	1 August 2007	42°34′54″S 148°04′12″E	World Heritage Site 2010
5		Australian Convict Sites – Fremantle Prison (listing)	Western Australia	1 August 2005	32°3′18″S 115°45′13″E	World Heritage Site 2010
5		Australian Convict Sites – Old Great North Road (listing)	New South Wales	1 August 2007	33°22′42″S 150°59′40″E	World Heritage Site 2010
5		Australian Convict Sites – Hyde Park Barracks (listing)	New South Wales	1 August 2007	33°52′10″S 151°12′45″E	World Heritage Site 2010
5		Australian Convict Sites – Kingston and Arthurs Vale Historic Area (listing)	Norfolk Island	1 August 2007	29°03′12″S 167°57′31″E	World Heritage Site 2010
5		Australian Convict Sites – Old Government House and Government Domain (listing)	New South Wales	1 August 2007	33°48′35″S 150°59′42″E	World Heritage Site 2010
5		Australian Convict Sites – Port Arthur Historic site (listing)	Tasmania	3 June 2005	43°08′52″S 147°51′05″E	World Heritage Site 2010
5		Australian Convict Sites – Woolmers Estate (listing)	Tasmania	23 November 2007	41°37′01″S 147°07′48″E	World Heritage Site 2010
6		Australian Cornish Mining Sites – Burra (listing)	South Australia	9 May 2017	33°40′47″S 138°55′03″E	
6		Australian Cornish Mining Sites – Moonta (listing)	South Australia	9 May 2017	34°04′32″S 137°36′31″E	
7		Australian Fossil Mammal Sites (Naracoorte) (listing)	South Australia	21 May 2007^{[A]}	36°57′S 140°45′E	Inscribed as a World Heritage Site in 1994
7		Australian Fossil Mammal Sites (Riversleigh) (listing)	Queensland	21 May 2007^{[A]}	19°04′59″S 138°43′01″E	World Heritage Site 1994
8		Australian War Memorial and the Memorial Parade (listing)	Australian Capital Territory	25 April 2006	35°16′49.76″S 149°08′56.56″E	
9		Batavia Shipwreck Site and Survivor Camps Area 1629, Houtman Abrolhos (listing)	Western Australia	6 April 2006	28°29′25″S 113°47′36″E	
10		Battle of the Coral Sea Site (listing)	Coral Sea Islands Territory	17 April 2025	16°16′00″S 162°20′00″E	
10		Beechworth Administrative Precinct (listing)	Victoria	16 August 2024	36°21′31″S 146°41′19″E	
10		Bondi Beach (listing)	New South Wales	25 January 2008	33°53′28″S 151°16′40″E	
11		Bonegilla Migrant Camp – Block 19 (listing)	Victoria	7 December 2007	36°07′52″S 147°00′49″E	
12		Brewarrina Aboriginal Fish Traps (Baiames Ngunnhu) (listing)	New South Wales	3 June 2005		
13		City of Broken Hill (listing)	New South Wales	20 January 2015	31°57′S 141°27′E	
14		Budj Bim National Heritage Landscape – Tyrendarra Area (listing)	Victoria	20 July 2004	38°12′00″S 141°46′00″E	World Heritage Site 2019
14		Budj Bim National Heritage Landscape – Mount Eccles Lake Condah Area (listing)	Victoria	20 July 2004	38°04′00″S 141°55′00″E	World Heritage Site 2019
15		The Burke, Wills, King and Yandruwandha National Heritage Place (listing)	Queensland, South Australia	22 January 2016		
16		Castlemaine Diggings National Heritage Park (listing)	Victoria	27 January 2005	37°11′29″S 144°12′59″E	
17		Centennial Park (listing)	New South Wales	3 October 2018	33°54′S 151°14′E	
18		Cheetup Rock Shelter (listing)	Western Australia	23 October 2009		
19		Coranderrk (listing)	Victoria	7 June 2011	37°41′02″S 145°31′19″E	
20		Cuttlefish Coast Sanctuary Zone (listing)	Western Australia	3 July 2007	33°01′S 137°42′E	
20		Cyprus Hellene Club - Australian Hall (listing)	New South Wales	20 May 2008		Site of the Aboriginal Day of Mourning in 1938
21		Dampier Archipelago (listing)	Western Australia	3 July 2007	20°34′52″S 116°48′29″E	
22		Dirk Hartog Landing Site 1616 – Cape Inscription Area (listing)	Western Australia	6 April 2006		
23		Dinosaur Stampede National Monument (listing)	Queensland	20 July 2004	23°00′58″S 142°24′41″E	
24		Echuca Wharf (listing)	Victoria	26 April 2007	36°07′12″S 144°44′50″E	
25		Ediacara Fossil Site – Nilpena (listing)	South Australia	11 January 2007	30°48′28″S 138°08′15″E	
26		Elizabeth Springs (listing)	Queensland	4 August 2009		
26		Erawondoo Hill (listing)	Western Australia	30 June 2020	26°07′S 117°09′E	
27		Eureka Stockade Gardens (listing)	Victoria	8 December 2004	37°33′55″S 143°53′3″E	
28		First Government House Site, Sydney (listing)	New South Wales	19 August 2005		
29		Fitzgerald River National Park (listing)	Western Australia	6 May 2016	33°56′51″S 119°36′55″E	
30		Flemington Racecourse (listing)	Victoria	7 November 2006	37°47′25″S 144°54′45″E	
31		Fraser Island (listing)	Queensland	21 May 2007^{[A]}	25°13′S 153°08′E	World Heritage Site 1992
32		Glass House Mountains National Landscape (listing)	Queensland	3 August 2006	26°50′51″S 152°57′15″E	
33		Glenrowan Heritage Precinct (listing)	Victoria	5 July 2005	36°28′S 146°14′E	Site of the Siege of Glenrowan and the capture of Ned Kelly
34		Goldfields Water Supply Scheme (listing)	Western Australia	23 June 2011		
35		Gondwana Rainforests – Barrington Tops Area (listing)	New South Wales	21 May 2007^{[A]}	32°03′10″S 151°29′37″E	World Heritage Site 1986
35		Gondwana Rainforests – Focal Peak Group (listing)	NSW, Qld	21 May 2007^{[A]}		World Heritage Site 1986
35		Gondwana Rainforests – Hastings-Macleay Group (listing)	New South Wales	21 May 2007^{[A]}		World Heritage Site 1986
35		Gondwana Rainforests – Iluka Nature Reserve (listing)	New South Wales	21 May 2007^{[A]}		World Heritage Site 1986
35		Gondwana Rainforests – Main Range National Park (listing)	NSW, Qld	21 May 2007^{[A]}	27°48′57″S 152°15′56″E	World Heritage Site 1986
35		Gondwana Rainforests – New England Group (listing)	New South Wales	21 May 2007^{[A]}		World Heritage Site 1986
35		Gondwana Rainforests – Shield Volcano Group (listing)	NSW, Qld	21 May 2007^{[A]}		World Heritage Site 1986
35		Gondwana Rainforests – Washpool and Gibraltar Range (listing)	New South Wales	21 May 2007^{[A]}		World Heritage Site 1986
36		Governors' Domain and Civic Precinct (listing)	New South Wales	10 February 2021	33°52′06″S 151°12′53″E	
37		Grampians National Park (Gariwerd) (listing)	Victoria	15 December 2006	37°12′28″S 142°23′59″E	
38		Great Barrier Reef (listing)	Queensland	21 May 2007^{[A]}	18°17′10″S 147°42′00″E	World Heritage Site 1981
39		Greater Blue Mountains Area (listing)	New South Wales	21 May 2007^{[A]}	33°43′05″S 150°18′38″E	World Heritage Site 2000
40		Great Ocean Road (listing)	Victoria	7 April 2011	38°44′02″S 143°41′14″E	
41		HMAS Sydney and HSK Kormoran shipwreck sites (listing)	Western Australia	14 March 2011	26°14′31″S 111°12′48″E	The two ships lie 22 kilometres (14 mi) apart.
42		HMVS Cerberus (listing)	Victoria	14 December 2005	37°58′03″S 145°00′28″E	
43		HMS Sirius (listing)	Norfolk Island	25 October 2011	29°2′36.9″S 167°57′18″E	
44		Heard and McDonald Islands (listing)	External territory	21 May 2007^{[A]}	53°06′00″S 73°31′00″E	World Heritage Site 1997
45		Hermannsburg Historic Precinct (listing)	Northern Territory	13 April 2006	23°56′35″S 132°46′40″E	
46		Old High Court Building, Melbourne (listing)	Victoria	11 July 2007		
47		High Court – National Gallery precinct (listing)	Australian Capital Territory	23 November 2007		
48		ICI Building (listing)	Victoria	21 September 2005	37°48′32″S 144°58′24″E	
49		Jordan River Levee (listing)	Tasmania	23 December 2011		Archeological site on a tributary of the River Derwent
50		Kamay Botany Bay (listing)	New South Wales	15 December 2006	34°01′14″S 151°13′29″E	
51		Ku-ring-gai Chase National Park, Lion Island, Long Island and Spectacle Island Nature Reserves (listing)	New South Wales	15 December 2006		
52		Kakadu National Park (listing)	Northern Territory	21 May 2007^{[A]}		World Heritage Site 1981
53		Kurnell Peninsula Headland (listing)	New South Wales	20 September 2004		James Cook's first landing site in Australia in 1770
54		Koonalda Cave (listing)	South Australia	15 October 2014	31°24′S 129°53′E	
55		Lesueur National Park (listing)	Western Australia	6 May 2016	30°08′04″S 115°06′02″E	
56		Lord Howe Island Group (listing)	New South Wales	21 May 2007^{[A]}	31°33′S 159°05′E	World Heritage Site 1982
57		Macquarie Island (listing)	Tasmania	21 May 2007^{[A]}	54°37′00″S 158°51′00″E	World Heritage Site 1997
58		Mawsons Huts and Mawsons Huts Historic site (listing)	Australian Antarctic Territory	27 January 2005	67°00′30″S 142°39′40″E	
59		Melbourne Cricket Ground (listing)	Victoria	26 December 2005	37°49′12″S 144°59′0″E	
60		Melbourne's Domain Parkland and Memorial Precinct (listing)	Victoria	11 February 2018	37°49′14″S 144°58′08″E	"The area was previously included in the National Heritage List using the emergency listing provisions of the Environment Protection and Biodiversity Act 1999 on 13 February 2017. The area was reviewed further under these provisions leading to a decision to keep the place with some alterations to its boundary and heritage values."
60		Mithaka Cultural Landscape (listing)	Queensland	5 December 2025	25°8′S 140°2′E	
61		Moree Baths and Swimming Pool Complex (listing)	New South Wales	6 September 2013	29°28′27″S 149°50′48″E	
62		Mount William Stone Hatchet Quarry (listing)	Victoria	25 February 2008	37°12′38″S 144°48′37″E	
63		Murtoa Stick Shed (listing)	Victoria	1 October 2014	36°37′23″S 142°28′41″E	
64		Myall Creek Massacre and Memorial Site (listing)	New South Wales	7 June 2008	29°46′52″S 150°42′45″E	
65		Newman College (listing)	Victoria	21 September 2005	37°47′42″S 144°57′49″E	
66		The Ningaloo Coast (listing)	Western Australia	6 January 2010		World Heritage Site 2011
67		Ngarrabullgan (listing)	Queensland	12 May 2011		
68		North Head, Sydney (listing)	New South Wales	12 May 2006		
69		Old Parliament House and Curtilage (listing)	Australian Capital Territory	20 June 2006	35.302097°S 149.12992°E	
70		Parkes Observatory (listing)	New South Wales	10 August 2020	32.99778°S 148.26292°E	
71		Point Cook Air Base (listing)	Victoria	29 August 2007	37°55′54″S 144°45′12″E	
72		Point Nepean Defence Sites and Quarantine Station Area (listing)	Victoria	16 June 2006		
73		Porongurup National Park (listing)	Western Australia	4 August 2009		
74		Purnululu National Park (listing)	Western Australia	21 May 2007^{[A]}		World Heritage Site 2003
75		Qantas Hangar, Longreach (listing)	Queensland	2 May 2009	23°26′11″S 144°16′28″E	
76		Queen Victoria Market (listing)	Victoria	23 July 2018	37°48′25″S 144°57′24″E	
77		Quinkan Country (listing)	Queensland	10 November 2018	15°38′42″S 144°30′26″E	
78		Recherche Bay (North East Peninsula) Area (listing)	Tasmania	7 October 2005		
79		Richmond Bridge (listing)	Tasmania	25 November 2005		
80		Rippon Lea House and Gardens (listing)	Victoria	11 August 2006	37°52′45″S 144°59′58″E	
81		Royal Exhibition Building and Carlton Gardens (listing)	Victoria	20 July 2004	37°48′17″S 144°58′16″E	World Heritage Site 2004
82		Royal National Park and Garawarra State Conservation Area (listing)	New South Wales	15 September 2006		
83		Shark Bay (listing)	Western Australia	21 May 2007^{[A]}		World Heritage Site 1991
84		Sidney Myer Music Bowl (listing)	Victoria	21 September 2005	37°49′24″S 144°58′28″E	
85		Snowy Mountains Scheme (listing)	New South Wales	14 October 2016	36°18′S 148°28′E	
86		South Australian Old and New Parliament Houses (listing)	South Australia	26 January 2006		
87		Stirling Range National Park (listing)	Western Australia	15 December 2006		
88		Sydney Gay and Lesbian Mardi Gras parade route (listing)	New South Wales	26 February 2026	33°52′50″S 151°13′2″E	
89		Sydney Harbour Bridge (listing)	New South Wales	19 March 2007	33°51′08″S 151°12′38″E	
90		Sydney Opera House (listing)	New South Wales	12 July 2005	33°51′25″S 151°12′55″E	World Heritage Site 2007
90		Tasmanian Wilderness (listing)	Tasmania	21 May 2007^{[A]}		World Heritage Site 1982
91		Tree of Knowledge, Barcaldine (listing)	Queensland	26 January 2006		Poisoned in 2006 and felled in 2007
92		Uluru-Kata Tjuta National Park (listing)	Northern Territory	21 May 2007^{[A]}	25°20′42″S 131°02′10″E	World Heritage Site 1987
92		Victorian Trades Hall (listing)	Victoria	21 May 2007^{[A]}	37°48′23″S 144°57′58″E	
93		Warrumbungle National Park (listing)	New South Wales	15 December 2006	31°13′54″S 149°01′04″E	
94		Watarrka National Park (listing)	Northern Territory	16 April 2026	24°16′47″S 131°33′30″E	
94		Wave Hill walk-off route (listing)	Northern Territory	9 August 2007		
95		Western Tasmania Aboriginal Cultural Landscape (listing)	Tasmania	8 February 2013		
96		West Kimberley (listing)	Western Australia	31 August 2011		
97		Wet Tropics of Queensland (listing)	Queensland	21 May 2007^{[A]}		World Heritage Site 1988
98		Wilgie Mia (listing)	Western Australia	24 February 2011	26°58′S 117°39′E	
99		Willandra Lakes Region (listing)	New South Wales	21 May 2007^{[A]}	33°39′55″S 143°00′04″E	World Heritage Site 1981; Includes Lake Mungo
100		Witjira-Dalhousie Springs (listing)	South Australia	4 August 2009	26°27′39″S 135°31′23″E	
101		Wurrwurrwuy stone arrangements (listing)	Northern Territory	7 August 2013	12.3311°S 136.9328°E	
102		Yea Flora Fossil Site (listing)	Victoria	11 January 2007	37°13′15″S 145°26′57″E	

== Notes ==
- ^{A} One of 15 World Heritage places included in the National Heritage List on 21 May 2007.
- ^{B} Yard 4 North was added on 4 August 2009.

== See also ==
- Commonwealth Heritage List
