= Governors' Domain and Civic Precinct =

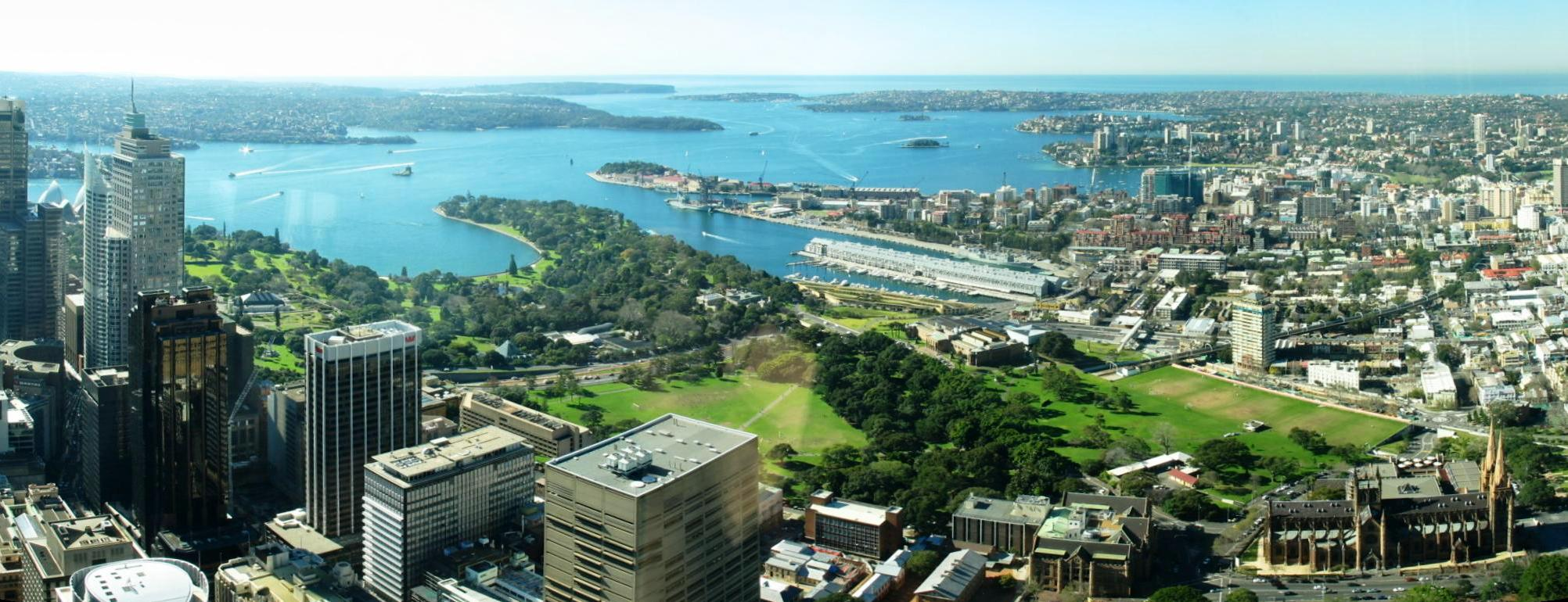

- The Domain viewed from above from the Sydney CBD (looking northeast)
- 33°52′6″S 151°12′53″E
- Location: Sydney, New South Wales, Australia

Australian National Heritage List
- Official name: Governors' Domain and Civic Precinct
- Type: Listed place
- Designated: 10 February 2021
- Reference no.: 106103

The Governors' Domain and Civic Precinct is a listed site on the Australian National Heritage List. The site is immediately to the east of the Sydney Central Business District (CBD), separating the CBD from the neighbourhood of Woolloomooloo. The site includes the Domain, the Royal Botanic Gardens, Hyde Park, Macquarie Street and Bridge Street and associated buildings.
