= Calga =

- Suburb
- Interactive map of Calga
- Coordinates: 33°25′55″S 151°13′05″E
- Country: Australia
- State: New South Wales
- City: Central Coast
- LGA: Central Coast Council
- Location: 62 km (39 mi) N of Sydney; 19 km (12 mi) W of Gosford

Government
  - State electorate: Gosford
  - Federal division: Robertson
- Elevation: 176 m (577 ft)

Population
  - Total: 134 (2021 census)
- Postcode: 2250
- Parish: Cowan
Suburbs around Calga
Glenworth Valley	Somersby	Somersby
Glenworth Valley	Calga	Mooney Mooney Creek
Mount White	Mooney Mooney Creek	Mooney Mooney Creek

Calga is a suburb and locality in the Central Coast region of New South Wales, Australia, located 62 kilometres (39 mi) north of Sydney. It is part of the Central Coast Council local government area.

It is home to a major interchange on the Pacific Motorway, Old Pacific Highway, and the Australia Walkabout Wildlife Park.

== History ==
Calga lies within the traditional lands of both the Darkinjung and Kuringgai peoples, and its name is an Aboriginal word meaning "the mouth". The locality's main feature is the state heritage-registered Aboriginal women's site, which includes the site of a sandstone amphitheater.

== Population ==
As of the 2021 Census, Calga had a population of 134 people. 79.1% of people were born in Australia, and 88.1% spoke only English at home.

== Heritage listings ==
Calga has a number of heritage-listed sites, including:

- Peats Ridge Road: Calga Aboriginal Cultural Landscape.
