= Brewarrina Aboriginal Fish Traps =

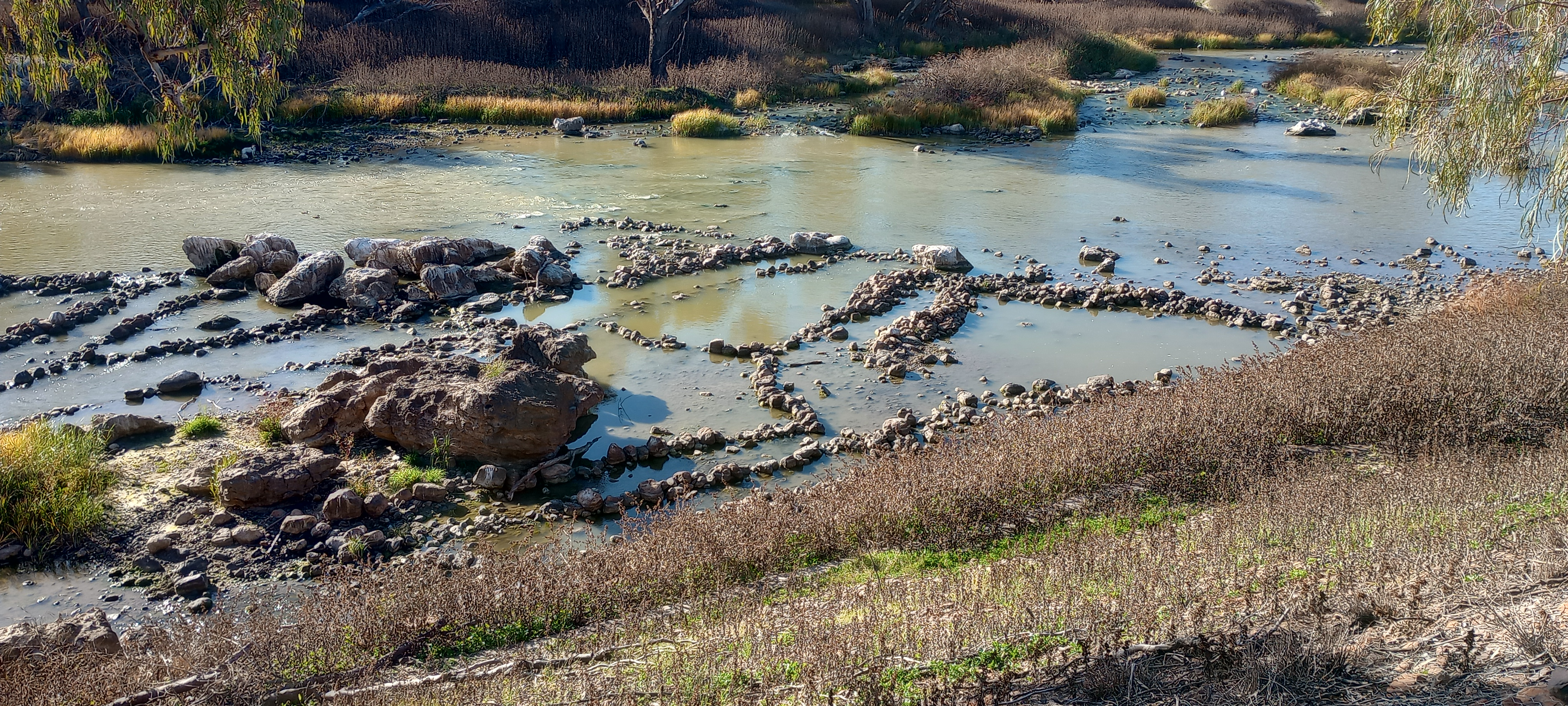
- The fish traps in 2023

- Location within New South Wales Location within Australia
- 29.9580°S 146.8534°E
- Location: Brewarrina, Brewarrina Shire, New South Wales, Australia

Site notes
- Architect: Baime
- Owner: Brewarrina Local Aboriginal Land Council; Brewarrina Shire Council; Crown Lands LPMA; NSW Office of Water

New South Wales Heritage Register
- Official name: Brewarrina Aboriginal Fish Traps / Baiame's Ngunnhu; Aboriginal Fishtraps; fisheries; Nonah; Nyemba Fish Traps; Biame; Biaime; Baime; water fishery
- Type: state heritage (landscape)
- Designated: 11 August 2000
- Reference no.: 1413
- Type: Fish/eel trap
- Category: Aboriginal
- Builders: Baime, Booma-ooma-nowi and Ghindi-inda-mui

Brewarrina Aboriginal Fish Traps are heritage-listed Australian Aboriginal fish traps on the Barwon River at Brewarrina, in the Orana region of, New South Wales, Australia. They are also known as Baiame's Ngunnhu, Nonah, or Nyemba Fish Traps. The Brewarrina Aboriginal Cultural Museum, opened in 1988, adjoins the site. The fish traps were added to the New South Wales State Heritage Register on 11 August 2000 and to the Australian National Heritage List on 3 June 2005.

It has been suggested that these fish traps may be the oldest human construction in the world.

== History ==
=== Aboriginal land ===
The traditional custodians of the fish traps are the Ngemba Wayilwan (or Wailwan) people. It has been estimated that the region supported a population of about 3,000 people prior to European settlement. The river people generally settled along the main rivers in summer and moved to regular campsites located in drier country during the winter months.

While the rivers acted as important travel and trade routes, each tribe had a clearly defined territory, the boundaries of which were commonly marked by prominent physical features. Evidence of the occupation and use of these places survives across the landscape in the form of open campsites, middens, scarred trees, stone quarries, stone arrangements, burial grounds, ceremonial sites and rock art. Archaeological remains are especially concentrated along riverine corridors, reflecting the intensive occupation of these areas. In 1829 Charles Sturt came across what he considered to be a permanent camp of 70 huts each capable of housing 12-15 people beside the Darling River near present-day Bourke. Similarly, Thomas Mitchell reported the existence of permanent huts on both banks of the Darling River above present-day Wilcannia in 1835.

Before the British came, thousands of people visited these fish traps for large corroborees in which each group's use of the fish traps was controlled by strict protocols. Brewarrina retains a rich collection of Aboriginal sites consisting of axe grinding grooves, burial grounds, open campsites, knapping sites, scarred trees, ceremonial sites, middens and stone quarries. Prior to European disturbance, both banks of the river at the fish traps were lined by almost continuous middens with an accumulation of shells and other objects more than a metre deep. In 1901, the anthropologist Robert Hamilton Mathews noted more than two dozen axe grinding places along the river banks at the fish traps. The Barwon Four Reserve on the northern bank of the Barwon River contains 250 recorded sites including two known burial grounds.

=== Creation story ===
The creation of the Ngunnhu is enshrined in ancient tradition. Many Aboriginal people believe that the fish traps were designed and created by Baiame, a great ancestral being who is respected by numerous cultural groups in western NSW, including the Ngemba Wayilwan, Morowari. Walkwan, Wongaibon, Ualarai, Kamilaroi and Wiradjuri. The creation story is well known to Aboriginal people of the region, having been passed down by word of mouth from generation to generation. Elements of the story have also been recorded by various European visitors to the fish traps, from Robert Hamilton Mathews in 1903 through to his granddaughter-in-law Janet Mathews in 1985.

According to legend, Baiame camped at a granite outcrop called Bai near present-day Byrock. A rock-hole located here was dug by him and the small depression nearby is where Baiame and his wives did their cooking. On the rock at Bai are impressions of a number of Baiame's weapons and utensils including his fighting club or "bunid" spear and dilly bag. He moved from here to Cobar where he camped in a large cave. The visible copper at Cobar is said to have been formed by the excrement of Baiame. From Cobar he traveled north.

Baiame reached the site where the Ngunnhu now stands during a time of drought. The Ngemba Wayilwan people were facing famine as Gurrungga (the deep waterhole at Brewarrina upstream of the rock bar) had completely dried up. Upon seeing their plight, Baiame conceived of a gift for the Ngemba Wayilwan - an intricate series of fish traps in the dry river bed. He designed the traps by casting his great net across the course of the river. Using the pattern of their father's net, Baiame's two sons Booma-ooma-nowi and Ghinda-inda-mui built the traps from stones.

Baiame then showed the Ngemba Wayilwan men how to call the rain through dance and song. Days of rain followed, filling the river channel and flooding Baiame's net which filled with thousands of fish. The old men rushed to block the entry of the stone traps, herding fish through the pens. Baiame instructed the Ngemba Wayilwan people in how to use and maintain the Ngunnhu. Although they were to be the custodians of the fishery, Baiame declared that the maintenance and use of the traps should be shared with other cultural groups in the area. People from all of the groups that came to use and rely upon the fish traps had deep feelings of gratitude to Baiame.

Two large footprints made by Baiame remained at the Ngunnhu. One was located opposite the rock called Muja, the other was some 350m downstream of the traps on the southern bank of the river. One of these imprints is still visible. It is a strong belief that wherever Baiame camped, some of his spirit remains at the site. This applies to the Ngunnhu.

After creating the Ngunnhu, Baiame's family group travelled further to the east. Their path is now the winding course of the Barwon River. The tracks of his spirit dogs who moved separately across the landscape formed the tributary streams of the Warrego, Culgoa, Bokhara and Bogan Rivers. Before rejoining Baiame at a camp between Cumborah and Walgett, the dogs camped together on an arid plain, transforming it into Narran Lake. The Ualarai people call Narran Lake "Galiburima" which means Wild Dog Water.

The story of Baiame as creator of the fish traps was reported by Kathleen Langloh Parker in her 1905 book, The Euahlayi Tribe: 'Byamee is the originator of things less archaic and important than totemism. There is a large stone fish-trap at Brewarrina, on the Barwan River. It is said to have been made by Byamee and his gigantic sons, just as later Greece attributed the walls of Tiryns to the Cyclops, or as Glasgow Cathedral has been explained in legend as the work of the Picts. Byamee also established the rule that there should be a common camping-ground for the various tribes, where, during the fishing festival, peace should be strictly kept, all meeting to enjoy the fish, and do their share towards preserving the fisheries.'

The travels of Baiame are only one of the many creation stories set within the landscape of the Brewarrina district. Others include the stories of the kurrea serpent living in Boobera Lagoon on the Barwon River, the great warrior Toolalla, an eminent man called Yooneeara, and Mullian, the eagle, at nearby Cuddie Springs.

The linkages between landscape features through long-distance creation stories means that many of them, including the fish traps, are important to Aboriginal people from distant places, as well as local communities.

=== Age of the fish traps ===
Given the location in the bed of a river, the fish traps would have been a dynamic structure, constantly changing. The river flow itself would have modified the fish traps which would also have been continually added to or altered by Aboriginal people over the course of hundreds or thousands of years. This constant reworking of the construction means that it is difficult to assign an original date to it.

An indication of when the Brewarrina fish traps were constructed may possibly be gauged by considering changes in the flow of the Barwon River. Construction of the fish traps would only have worked if low water levels were relatively frequent and regular in the river. Evidence from the lower Darling River indicates that during the past 50,000 years prolonged periods of low flow occurred between 15,000 and 9,000 years ago, and then from about 3,000 years ago up until the present time. Whether or not these dates also apply to low flow periods in the Barwon River is currently unknown.

=== Early European descriptions ===
The earliest known reference to the fish traps by a European was made in 1848 by the then Commissioner of Crown Lands at Wellington, W. C. Mayne. His observations, albeit brief, were made within the first decade of European settlement of the district:

In a broad but shallow part of the head of the River where there are numerous rocks, the Aborigines have formed several enclosures or Pens, if I may use the word, into which the fish are carried, or as it were decoyed by the current, are there retained. To form these must have been a work of no trifling labour, and no slight degree of ingenuity and skill must have been exercised in their construction, as I was informed by men who have passed several years in the vicinity, that not even the heaviest floods displace the stones forming these enclosures.

A second, equally brief description was published in 1861 by William Richard Randell, the captain of the river boat Gemini, who had navigated the upper reaches of the Darling River as far as the "Nonah" in 1859. His report in the Journal of the Royal Geographical Society states:

The obstacle presented to the navigation at Nonah is a fall at low water and a very swift rapid at the time of the Gemini's visit; the descent being about 8 feet in 200 or 300 yards, and the water boiling and foaming over rocks for that distance. It is called the Black's fishing-grounds in consequence of their having (assisted by natural facilities) built a great number of circular walls of stone in the bed of the river extending from below the falls to a distance of half a mile above.

The first known detailed studies of the fish traps were made in the early years of the 20th century. The surveyor Robert Hamilton Mathews, one of the pioneers of Australian anthropology, visited the fish traps in 1901. He prepared the first detailed documentation of the fish traps, relying heavily upon the knowledge of Aboriginal people he had met. In 1903, Mathews described the construction and layout of the fish traps in a paper published in the journal of the Royal Society of New South Wales. Five years after Mathews' visit, A. W. Mullen, a surveyor with the Western Lands Board of New South Wales, also surveyed the fish traps. Two versions of his plan survive. The most detailed of these is drawn in his field notebook. The second plan, dated 15 June 1906, is based upon the first but has been simplified.

When Mathews and Mullen surveyed the fish traps there were already far fewer traps than in pre-European times because of disuse or disturbance from the activities of early settlers. The key features of the construction of the fish traps as described by Mathews and Mullen are summarized in Hope and Vines (1994).

About the same time as the first surveys of the fish traps were being conducted in the early 20th century, numerous photographs were taken of the fisheries. These are held in the Tyrell Collection in the Museum of Applied Arts and Sciences in Sydney.

=== Disruption and decline ===
The appearance of Europeans on the banks of the Barwon River heralded the beginning of a prolonged period of dramatic, and often violent, disruption of Aboriginal society. It also marked the start of the deliberate and sometimes inadvertent degradation of Baiame's Ngunnhu.

Introduced diseases ravaged Aboriginal populations in advance of the first European explorers and settlers. During the 1820s and 1830s, smallpox epidemics spread along the important travel routes of the Murray and Darling River systems causing many deaths. The first European explorer to visit the region, Captain Charles Sturt, reached the Darling River in 1829 by which time much disease prevailed throughout the tribes. By 1836, white settlement had reached the junction of the Barwon and Castlereagh Rivers. Within three years, settlers had occupied land at Baiame's Ngunnhu.

The first legal title to land at Brewarrina was granted to the Lawson brothers in 1839. Their run, named "Moheni", extended along the southern bank of the Barwon River adjacent to the fish traps. The opposite bank was included in Quantambone station which had been established by Major George Druitt. Within a decade, river frontage properties were occupied along the length of the Barwon River. With the concentration of settlers and their stock along the rivers of the region, Aboriginal people were dispossessed of many of their important waterholes, hunting grounds, camping areas and ceremonial sites, disrupting the traditional life of the Ngemba Wayilwan, Kamilaroi and Ualarai people.

The twenty years that followed the initial pastoral invasion of Aboriginal lands were characterized by violent clashes. According to Dargin it was a time of "many killings, retaliatory raids, punitive expeditions, revenge or fear killings, or more euphemistically, grazing or property management or sport. For the first decade of white settlement, guerrilla warfare prevailed".

In addition to the loss of their tribal lands, a key grievance was the abduction and abuse of Aboriginal women. Frontier life was considered to be too harsh for white women, leading to an imbalance between the numbers of men and women in the settler population. As a result, the abduction of Aboriginal women by white settlers became a common practice. In one recorded incident in 1859 a stockman at Walcha Hut on the Lawson run was warned by the Aboriginals to release one of their women. He refused, and both he and the woman were killed. In retaliation, the settlers shot a large number of Aboriginal men, women and children in what became known as the Hospital Creek Massacre.

The rock bar across the Barwon River at the fish traps quickly became a common watering and camping place for teamsters and drovers moving mobs of cattle. This appropriation of the fish traps angered the Ngemba Wayilwan people, as evidenced by the recollections of William Kerrigan: "My father and his two brothers, Bob and Andrew, came to Brewarrina when the blacks were bad, my father had someone with him when he used to cart water from the rocky crossing, each one used to take turn about with the rifle in case a wild black showed his head in the scrub on the bank".

Prompted by the loss of access to the fish traps for Aboriginal people, the then Commissioner of Crown Lands at Wellington, W. C. Mayne, attempted to have the area around the fishery reserved for Aboriginal people in 1848. Nothing came of Mayne's recommendation.

Large gatherings of Aboriginal people came to be viewed with suspicion. A policy of detribalisation was introduced, in which family groups were separated from each other at different pastoral stations. The effects of this policy and the ongoing violence on the use of the fish traps by Aboriginal people were catastrophic. The last time the fish traps were fully utilised and regularly maintained was probably during the 1850s or 1860s.

=== Township of Brewarrina ===
European occupation of the Brewarrina district not only made the traditional use and maintenance of the fish traps difficult but resulted in much active destruction of them.

The rock bar at the fish traps provided a ready-made river crossing for settlers establishing stations to the north. The abundant stones of the fish traps were used to fill in holes in the crossing to make a ford suitable for bullock drays. But it was the arrival of Captain William Randall in his riverboat the "Gemini" in 1859 that dramatically hastened the demise of the traps. As the head of navigation on the Darling River, the site had great potential to be developed as a port to service the riverboat trade.

The township of Brewarrina was surveyed in 1861 and formally proclaimed on 28 April 1863. As the town developed, rocks were removed from the fish traps for use in building foundations and to upgrade the ford across the river into a causeway. Randell, in an 1861 report on his pioneering trip, had noted that:

I believe that a passage may be very easily made through these rocks [the fish traps], so that steamers could ascend the rapids with the assistance of warps in seasons of moderate flow.

His suggestion was acted upon and rocks that formed parts of the fish traps were removed to create a passage for steamers and barges. Additional rocks were removed or displaced to free riverboats that periodically became trapped in the fish traps at low water levels.

In 1872 a pontoon bridge was constructed across the river just downstream of the fish traps for the crossing of sheep, wool and other goods. Two years later a public punt was established nearby for the ferrying of light vehicles.

At this time, some 300 Aboriginal people lived at Brewarrina. But with the arrival of Sergeant Steele in 1878, Aboriginal people were forced to camp away from the town on the northern bank of the Barwon River adjacent to the fish traps. They were instructed to only visit town during daylight hours and at 6pm each evening Steele enforced a curfew with a horsewhip.

The "problem" of Aboriginal people camping around Brewarrina was deemed by the first Protector of Aborigines to be one of the most pressing issues in NSW. In 1885 the Aborigines Protection Board moved the Aboriginal people to a reserve on the northern bank of the river two miles from town. In the following year they were moved again, still further from town, to the Brewarrina Aboriginal Mission, a mission established by the Aborigines Protection Association. This new mission was located ten miles out of town on a 5,000 acre reserve. On the mission, people were prevented from eating their traditional foods. Instead they were served rations of sugar, tea, coffee and refined flour. They were also forbidden to speak their own language or participate in any of their cultural practices or customs.

Despite this segregation and the forced abandonment of their cultural traditions, a report in the Sydney Mail in 1888 claimed that: "The blacks still adhere to their old habit of frequenting the Fisheries at proper seasons, when they rejoice in high living, coupled with corroborees". But by then, the great corroborees of earlier times were no more, with gatherings attracting hundreds rather than thousands of people.

By 1897 the Brewarrina Aboriginal Mission was home to about 43 Aboriginal people. According to A.W. Mullen writing in 1906: "there is a woman at present at the Mission station called Murray or Nelly Taylor whose husband (now dead) for years back helped to keep these Fishery in repair and told the younger members of the tribe that the aborigines built the Fishery - this woman is now about 70 years of age and her husband was much older than she was".

During the early years of the 20th century, the fish traps continued to receive some use and parts of the system were kept in repair by the small community of Ngemba Wayilwan and Morowari people living at the mission. Doreen Wright of the Ngemba Wayilwan people recalled: 'Old King Clyde, he was the boss of the stone fish traps here in the river at Brewarrina. When the old people wanted to get fish down at the traps the old King would tell them all to stand out on the banks. The old King would dive down into the fish going into the stone fish traps. The old people wouldn't have to spear the fish, they would just walk into the river and catch them under the gills and fill their bugguda, their dilly bags, up with them'.

Some of the traps were still being maintained by people from the mission in 1912. They replaced smaller fallen rocks and frequently diverted the water flow to cut away deposits of silt. In 1915 just one man, Steve Shaw, was working the traps. He would block the entrance to a trap with an iron wheel covered with wire and wade through the trap disturbing any fish with a length of wire and driving them into the shallow end where he caught them in a small wire net.

Between World War I and World War II, the fish traps, then known as "The Rocks" became a place for Aboriginal people to drink alcohol. With police patrols searching for drunks, many Aboriginal people stopped visiting the area during this period. During the 1920s and 1930s, many people were brought to the Brewarrina mission from places such as Tibooburra, Angledool, Goodooga, Culgoa, Collarenebri and Walgett as Aboriginal settlements in those towns were closed down. This centralisation of Aboriginal communities resulted in the Brewarrina mission becoming the largest such institution in Australia until it was closed in 1966.

Dray loads of stone continued to be taken from the fish traps during the 1920s, with even larger quantities of stone removed in later years for roadworks. Still at this time, the custom by which members of another tribe could only catch fish at the fish traps after gaining permission from a Ngemba Wayilwan elder was still recognized.

Floods also took their toll on the fish traps. Two large floods in the 1950s caused large parts of the fisheries to be covered in silt.

Construction of the Brewarrina Weir, which was opened in 1971, resulted in the destruction of the remaining parts of the upstream set of fish traps. As part of the weir development, a 90m-long channel was built from the original fishway at the weir to the middle of the river course. This involved the removal of additional stones and the pouring of concrete in the river channel in order to back water up to the fishway. A single Aboriginal man, Cassidy Samuels, protested against the construction of the weir, chaining himself to the safety nets erected at the site during blasting works.

For more than 160 years, the fish traps has endured deliberate and inadvertent destruction and suffered from the loss of traditional management and maintenance. Yet despite this, substantial elements of the fish traps and its significance to Aboriginal people have survived.

=== Recent years ===
Two attempts to reconstruct or repair sections of the fish traps have occurred in recent times. In the early 1970s the Brewarrina Council obtained a grant from the Directorate of Aboriginal Welfare to employ local Aboriginal people to restore parts of the fish traps. The work undertaken was not documented, though there are theories about which structures were possibly associated with this early reconstruction exercise. More of the contemporary stone wall structures may be the result of building work reportedly undertaken in recent years by children and adults wishing to privately reconstruct the fish traps.

Despite their imperfect condition, the Brewarrina Fish Traps / Baiame's Ngunnhu remain an inspirational destination for Aboriginal and non-Aboriginal people alike. Beyond its role as a tourism drawcard, the fish traps are also viewed by Aboriginal people as a teaching place, one that can contribute to cultural renewal, understanding and tolerance.

The Brewarrina Aboriginal Cultural Museum has been constructed on the south bank of the river near the fish traps, a free-form curvilinear building consisting of a series of earth-covered domes that represent traditional shelters or gunyas. Funded by a bicentennial grant, the museum was designed by the NSW Government Architect's office under project architect Olga Kosterin and officially opened in 1988. It won an Australian Institute of Architects Balcakett Award for regional architecture in 1991. The mission statement for the museum stated:

To preserve, develop and promote our ancient culture, heritage and tradition. To enlighten the broader community and most importantly our own young. To let them be made aware of their ancestors, let them be proud of their descendants, and let them know how they struggled, suffered and created happiness, so that we still survive in the driest continent on earth - knowing that through different governments and policies over the last 150 years we still have our own identity. This project Is about Aboriginal pride.

In 1996, rebuilding to some of the walls that had been neglected over time took place by members of the Aboriginal community, particularly through Community Development Employment Projects.

In 2000 the Brewarrina Fish Traps were listed on the NSW State Heritage Register (SHR) and in 2006 they were listed on the Australian National Heritage List (called by their Aboriginal name, 'Baiame's Ngunnhu").

In 2008, federal funding was announced for interpretation works, with $180,000 for "keeping place" works, alongside fish traps.

Between 2006 and 2012, the NSW Department of Fisheries underwent an extensive local consultation process to build a new fishway in the Brewarrina weir just east of the fish traps to allow more indigenous fish to navigate the river upstream. In its final form as a curving rock stairway adjoining the weir and next to the south bank of the river at Weir Park, the fishway should not be confused with the traditional fish traps located some metres further downstream from the weir.

== Description ==
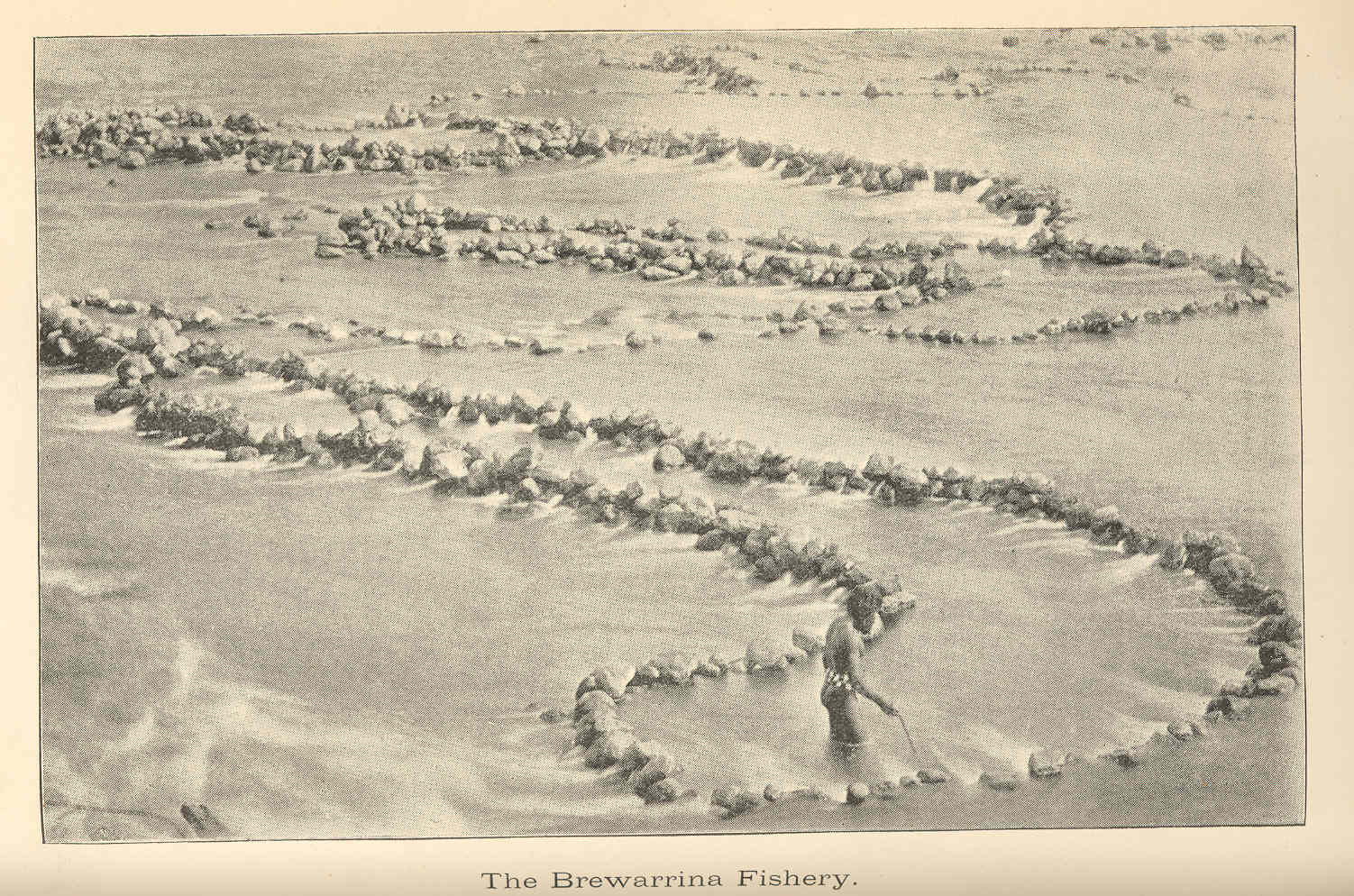
Fish traps, 1893

The Brewarrina Aboriginal Fish Traps, also known as Baiame's Ngunnhu, consists of a series of dry-stone weirs and ponds arranged in the form of a stone net across the Barwon River in north west NSW. They occupy the entire length of a 400m-long rock bar that extends from bank to bank across the river bed. Here, the river is fast-flowing and shallow, descending 3.35m over a set of four low rapids

In 1994 Hope and Vines summarized the known characteristics of the fish trap construction. The construction methods display sophistication and economy with rocks placed tightly together, often with their length across the wall rather than along it. The result is a knitting of the courses together, a method that provides greater strength. Further stability is gained by the technique of placing large stones along the tops of the walls, like capping stones on a dry stone wall. The curved forms of individual traps are also probably designed to enhance stability. The teardrop-shaped curves act as arches against the weight of the water with the tail sections following the lines of the currents.

=== Natural context ===
The fish traps are located in the Darling Riverine Plains Bioregion, a semi-arid area characterised by a hot and dry climate. The bioregion has undergone significant modification since the commencement of European occupation in the first half of the nineteenth century. Extensive areas within the bioregion have been cleared and the combination of droughts, overstocking of properties, the spread of weed species and changes to fire regimes have contributed to widespread land degradation. The poor state of the Barwon River, no different to the condition of most rivers in the bioregion, has impacted upon the integrity of the fish traps.

The Barwon River Catchment occupies part of a large Cainozoic basin where flood plain sediments deposited by ancient rivers have buried the underlying bedrock in all but a few places, one of which is the fish traps. Light grey clay stained with the yellows and reds of iron oxide extends as a low cliff along the southern bank of the river downstream of the fish traps. This clay exposure was an important source of ochre for bodily decoration and other use by the Ngemba people.

=== Barwon River ===
The fish traps are situated at the southern edge of the Great Artesian Basin, the groundwater of which sustains the base flows of the rivers of the region.

The Barwon River originates in the Great Dividing Range in south-east Queensland, north east of Brewarrina. Its headwaters feed the Macintyre River which marks a section of the Queensland / New South Wales state border. The Macintyre is known as the Barwon River downstream of the town of Mungindi. The river changes names once again at its confluence with the Culgoa River, some 80 km downstream of the fish traps, to become the Darling River

The Barwon River is classified as a controlled river with reduced flow. The reduced flow volumes and variability are primarily due to upstream harvesting and extraction of surface water and groundwater for agricultural purposes. Key water quality problems in the river include contamination with agricultural pesticides, high concentrations of nutrients and salt, the large quantity of suspended sediments present and the occurrence of algal blooms.

The degraded state of the Barwon River is reflected in the listing of the aquatic ecological community of the natural drainage system of the lowland catchment of the Darling-Barwon River as an endangered ecological community.

Sources of river impairment exist within the curtilage itself. The Brewarrina sewerage plant outfall pipe discharges into the river near the ochre beds while the concrete form of the Brewarrina Weir dominates the upstream end of the traps.

=== Modification of natural context ===
Sections of the southern bank have been highly modified through the construction or placement of a range of soil stabilization and flood mitigation measures. These include the:

- formation of earth banks;
- laying of rows of sandbags (filled with sand and cement);
- use of rock-filled gabions;
- covering of an entire section of slope with imported rocks (wire-covered with concrete edges);
- installation of steel section and concrete retaining walls at river level;
- use of rows of concrete blocks;
- laying of geotextile sheeting;
- placement of granite boulders in the river channel;
- construction of a concrete flood levee wall running along the top of the bank. and
- construction of a fishway largely constructed of stone boulders through on the southern end of the weir.

Little archaeological material is likely to remain in situ on the southern bank of the river due to the highly disturbed nature of this area. Parts of the southern bank within the curtilage have previously served as a rubbish tip and a landscaped park, while a series of major bank stabilisation works has resulted in the importation of new material and the removal or burial of the original soil layer.

=== Weir ===
The Brewarrina Weir, or Darling Weir Number 15, is a 1.2m high fixed crest structure built at the head of the rock bar upon which the Fish traps are situated. Officially opened on 20 August 1971, the weir was built to provide a domestic water supply for the township of Brewarrina. Sixteen irrigators also extract water from the weir pool which extends upstream for a distance of approximately 100 km.

The weir has adversely impacted upon the integrity of the fish traps, and on the ecology of the river. Apart from the direct physical damage to the upstream set-of fish traps, construction of the weir has altered the flow of the river and the natural processes of sediment erosion, transportation and deposition. The weir evenly distributes water flow across the river channel except at low flows when the fishway installed at the time of construction channels water to the northern side of the river. By contrast, the natural, low-flow of the river followed a channel near the southern bank. This change of flow patterns has resulted in the formation of silt banks that have buried portions of the fish traps.

The presence of the weir has also reduced the occurrence of small river height rises that naturally flush the system. The rocks of the fish traps are often covered with algae and the trapping of fine sediments and nutrients behind the weir has led to an increased incidence of blue-green algal blooms in the weir pool. The still water habitats created by the weir are more suited to introduced fish species, such as carp, than native fish.

The Brewarrina Weir was constructed with a submerged orifice fishway which proved to be too steep for native Australian fish to negotiate. A new fishway with a less steep design, resembling a stairway of rocks, was installed on the weir in 2012.

=== Built context associated with the fish traps ===
The recreational and educational centrepiece at the fish traps is the Brewarrina Aboriginal Cultural Museum. The building, designed by the NSW Government Architect's Office with project architect Olga Kosterin, won a Blacket Award for regional architecture in 1991.

The design of the Brewarrina Aboriginal Cultural Museum precinct is empathetic and commensurate with the significance of the place. The red soil and granite rocks within the precinct were imported in order to establish a bush tucker educational area.

Various other visitor facilities are also located along the southern bank of the river within the curtilage. A large number and variety of signs have also been erected along the southern bank of the river. Most of this infrastructure is situated in Weir Park and was installed by the Brewarrina Shire Council during the 1970s and 1990s. An old tractor is also located in the park. The tractor and most of the signage may be considered intrusive to the significance of the place.

Much of the northern bank of the river is owned by the Brewarrina Local Aboriginal Land Council, which has built several residences there. The northern bank has been damaged through clearing, grazing and the movement of livestock, vehicles and people. Despite this, surveys of the Barwon Four Aboriginal Reserve have revealed 250 archaeological sites including burial grounds, open campsites, scarred trees and middens. The two traditional burial grounds located here are surrounded by protective fences, though bone fragments and stone artefacts are scattered throughout the area. Visitor facilities are not provided on the northern bank of the river.

=== Condition ===
As at 23 July 2013, the fish traps have been considerably damaged in the past. In the mid-1860s a crossing was built by European settlers at the upstream end of the fish traps by filling holes with stones from the traps and moving other stones to provide the ford that bullock drays could use. Stones from the traps were also moved to enable navigation of river craft, and in the 1920s dray loads of stone were removed for building foundations of buildings in the town.

Construction of the 1.2-metre-high (3.9 ft) Brewarrina weir on the Barwon River in the mid-1960s further disturbed the remains of the fish traps at the upstream end. The weir has adversely impacted on the cultural integrity of the fish traps and on the ecology of the river. The weir, and the fishway that was included in the original construction, also changed the flow pattern through the traps. The weir evenly distributed flow across the river where beforehand it followed a channel near the south-east bank. The fishway also channelled low flows to the north side of the river. Prevention of fish migration by weirs and dams is a major reason for the decline in native fish populations in the Murray-Darling river system.

Surveys of the remaining structures of the fish traps were conducted in 1991 and 1993 as part of the conservation planning study-undertaker by Jeanette Hope and Gary Vines (1994). The first of these surveys revealed that there were significant distortions in the plan of the fisheries prepared by Mullen in 1906, due to him apparently drawing in details of the walls and traps by eye. High water levels during the 1993 fieldwork prevented the second survey from being completed.

Utilising these two surveys and low level aerial photographs dating from 1980 and colour and infrared photographs taken in 1991, Hope and Vines made the following observations concerning the remaining early structures of the fisheries:

- Many walls and traps shown on the 1906 plan no longer exist;
- Of the four original sets of traps, evidence of three sets remains visible (No evidence remains of the upstream set);
- Of the original 1.8 km of walls (of traps, yards and connecting walls), 750m survive in some form;
- Only 5 per cent of the original system survives in a substantially intact form, that is, the stone structures are still standing on their original alignments and possibly to their original heights; and
- Some traces of approximately 50 per cent of the traps and walls shown on the early plans and photographs remain.

There is unlikely to have been significant changes to the condition of the early structures of the fish traps since the early 1990s, as most of the surviving walls appear to be in a stable state of collapse. That said, minor displacements and rearrangements of rocks are likely to have occurred, largely through the activities of children playing and fishing in the river. Conversely, some of the silt banks currently found at the fish traps are relatively recent formations and it is possible that additional parts of the fish traps still exist beneath these deposits.

However, despite these impacts much of the fish traps remains, particularly at the downstream end. There is great potential to rehabilitate the individual traps to their original condition.

== Heritage listing ==
=== NSW ===
The traditional Aboriginal fish traps at Brewarrina, also known as Baiame's Ngunnhu [pronounced By-ah-mee's noon-oo], comprises a nearly half-kilometre long complex of dry-stone walls and holding ponds within the Barwon River in north west NSW. The fish traps are the largest group recorded in Australia and are arranged in an unusual and innovative way that allowed fish to be herded and caught during both high and low river flows. According to Aboriginal tradition, the ancestral creation being, Baiame, generated the design by throwing his net over the river and, with his two sons Booma-ooma-nowi and Ghinda-inda-mui, building the fish traps to this design.

Ngemba people are the custodians of the fishery and continue to use and have responsibilities for the fish traps. It is said that Baiame instructed these responsibilities to be shared with other traditional owner groups who periodically gathered in large numbers at the fish traps for subsistence, cultural and spiritual reasons. The place is extremely significant to the Aboriginal people of western and northern NSW for whom it is imbued with spiritual, cultural, traditional and symbolic meanings. The creation of the fish traps, and the laws governing their use, helped shape the spiritual, political, social, ceremonial and trade relationships between Aboriginal groups from across the greater landscape. The site was one of the great Aboriginal meeting places of eastern Australia.

The bedrock outcrop upon which the traps are built is a rare geological exposure in an expansive alluvial basin. Study of the outcrop has the potential to contribute to a better understanding of the evolution of the Australian landscape.

Brewarrina Aboriginal Fish Traps was listed on the New South Wales State Heritage Register on 11 August 2000 having satisfied the following criteria:

The place is important in demonstrating the course, or pattern, of cultural or natural history in New South Wales.

The Brewarrina Aboriginal fish traps is the largest system of traditional fish traps recorded in Australia. Its unusual, innovative and complex design demonstrates the development of a highly skilled fishing technique involving a thorough understanding of dry stone wall construction principles, river hydrology and fish biology. It is evidence of a distinctive way of life that is no longer practised today. Baiame, an ancestral being, is understood by many Aboriginal people from NSW to be responsible for the design and traditional use of these fish traps. According to Aboriginal tradition, Baiame generated the design by throwing his net over the river and, with his two sons Booma-ooma-nowi and Ghinda-inda-mui, building the fish traps to this design. Neighbouring tribes were invited to the fish traps to join in great corroborees, initiation ceremonies, and meetings for trade and barter. The fish traps indicate how a common understanding of this ancestral being influenced the social, cultural and spiritual interactions between a number of Aboriginal groups in relation to a major built structure on one group's land. Because of the fish traps, this place was one of the great Aboriginal meeting places of eastern Australia.

The place is important in demonstrating aesthetic characteristics and/or a high degree of creative or technical achievement in New South Wales.

The stone fish traps of the Barwon River have fish trapping pens with teardrop-shaped structures and convex walls that are upstream-facing in order to withstand the powerful current of the river. The walls are of varying heights and are fitted with pond gates, which make it possible for the traps to trap fish when the water levels are high and when they are low, depending on whether the fish is moving upriver or downriver.

The place has strong or special association with a particular community or cultural group in New South Wales for social, cultural or spiritual reasons.

The place is extremely significant to the Aboriginal people of western and northern NSW for whom it is imbued with spiritual, cultural, traditional and symbolic meanings. While the Ngemba people are the custodians of the fish traps, it is understood to have been Baiame's wish that other tribes in the region, including the Morowari, Paarkinji, Weilwan, Barabinja, Ualarai and Kamilaroi should use it in an organised way. It is said that particular traps were allocated to each family group who were then responsible under Aboriginal law for their use and maintenance. The spiritual influence of the fish traps on the Aboriginal people who built and used them is demonstrated across western NSW through story association as well as related artwork.

The fish traps were and remain an important meeting place for Aboriginal people with connections to the area. The fisheries are also valued by contemporary Aboriginal community as a highly visible symbol of traditional life and ownership of country.

The place has potential to yield information that will contribute to an understanding of the cultural or natural history of New South Wales.

The fish traps offer great potential for researching how Aboriginal people occupied this part of the country before colonisation. The place is understood to have been an important meeting place and ceremonial site for different Aboriginal groups in the region. The fish traps provide an important opportunity for Aboriginal children, visitors and researchers to understand and appreciate the culture of Aboriginal people of western NSW.

Aside from the obvious Aboriginal significance, the Fisheries are built on a bedrock outcrop which is a rare geological exposure along the Darling River system which reveals evidence of past landscape history.

The place possesses uncommon, rare or endangered aspects of the cultural or natural history of New South Wales.

The Aboriginal fishery at Brewarrina (Ngunnhu) is rare in being a dry-stone fish trap located on a large river system and the largest fish trap recorded in NSW and Australia. It features a complex design that exploits an unusual location. Aboriginal people used the unusual combination of a large rock bar, seasonal river flows and suitable local rocks to develop the fish traps, nearly half a kilometre long. The size, design and complexity of these fish traps is exceptional in Australia. The role of an ancestral being (Baiame) in creating built structures is also rare in Aboriginal society and adds to the significance of the fish traps.

There are only four other fish traps recorded in NSW of which three are only exposed in drought conditions and are eroded almost to invisibility.

=== National ===
The fish traps were added to the Australian National Heritage List on 3 June 2005.
