= Melbourne Cricket Ground =

Stadium in Melbourne, Victoria, Australia

- MCG the 'G

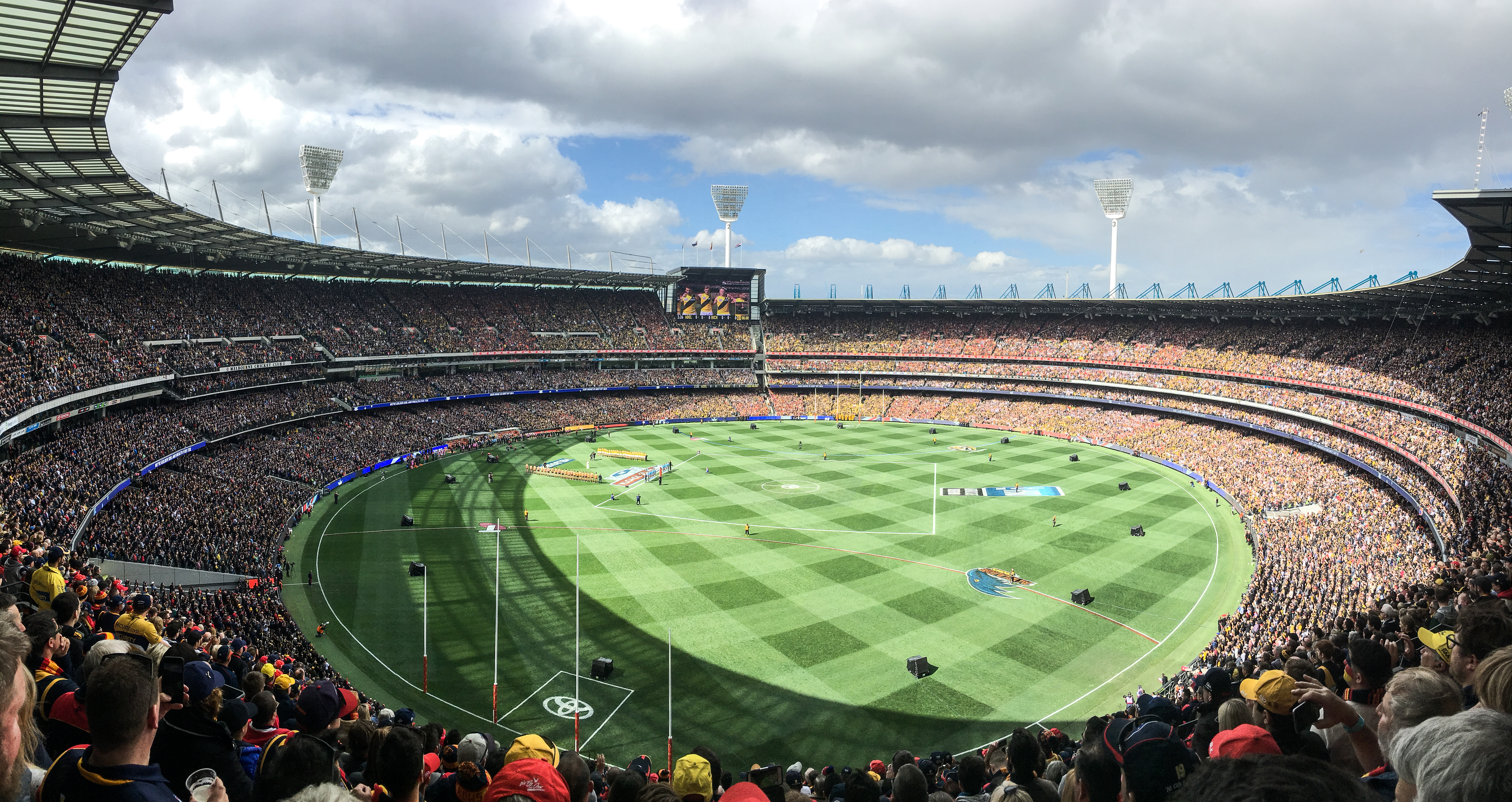
- Panorama of the MCG before the 2017 AFL Grand Final
- Interactive map of Melbourne Cricket Ground
- Address: 120 Barassi Way; East Melbourne, Victoria, Australia
- Coordinates: 37°49′12″S 144°59′0″E
- Owner: Victoria State Government
- Operator: Melbourne Cricket Club
- Capacity: 100,024 (95,000 seats + 5,000 standing room)
- Executive suites: 109
- Surface: Grass
- Record attendance: 109,500 – Ed Sheeran +–=÷× Tour; 143,000 – Billy Graham Crusade (pre-configuration)
- Field size: 174 metres x 149 metres (general); 160 metres x 141 metres (AFL); 172.9 metres x 147.8 metres (cricket)
- Public transit: Richmond; Jolimont

Construction
- Opened: 23 September 1853; 173 years ago
- Renovated: 1992 (Southern Stand redevelopment); 2006 (Northern Stand redevelopment); 2032 (Proposed Shane Warne Stand redevelopment)
- Cost: Estimated A$725 million (excluding original 1853 construction)

Tenants
- Australian Football League (AFL) Melbourne Football Club (1858–present); Richmond Football Club (1965–present); Collingwood Football Club (1993–present); Essendon Football Club (1991–present); Hawthorn Football Club (2000–present); Carlton Football Club (2005–present); North Melbourne Football Club (1985–2005); University Football Club (1911–1914) Cricket Australian cricket team (1877–present); Victoria cricket team (1851–present); Melbourne Stars (2011–present); Melbourne Renegades (2026–present) National Rugby League (NRL) Melbourne Storm (2000) Soccer Australia men's national soccer team (selected matches); Australia women's national soccer team (selected matches); Melbourne Victory (international friendly matches): Major Events; 1956 Summer Olympics 1988 Women's Cricket World Cup 1992 Cricket World Cup Football at the 2000 Summer Olympics 2006 Commonwealth Games 2015 Cricket World Cup State of Origin series 1994, 1995, 1997, 2015, 2018, 2024 2020 ICC Women's T20 World Cup 2022 ICC Men's T20 World Cup Boxing Day Test FIFA World Cup qualification
Cricket details
Ground information
Country	Australia
End names
West: City End (AFL); North: Members End (Cricket) South: Shane Warne Stand End (Cricket); East: Punt Road End (AFL)
International information
First men's Test	15–19 March 1877: Australia v England
Last men's Test	26–29 December 2025: Australia v England
First men's ODI	5 January 1971: Australia v England
Last men's ODI	4 November 2024: Australia v Pakistan
First men's T20I	1 February 2008: Australia v India
Last men's T20I	31 October 2025: Australia v India
First women's Test	18–20 January 1935: Australia v England
Last women's Test	28–31 January 1949: Australia v England
First women's ODI	18 December 1988: Australia v England
Last women's ODI	23 January 2014: Australia v England
First women's T20I	1 February 2008: Australia v England
Last women's T20I	8 March 2020: Australia v India
As of 2 February 2024; Source: Cricinfo
Heritage listing details
Australian National Heritage List
Type	Historic
Criteria	a, g, h
Designated	26 December 2005; 20 years ago
Reference no.	105885
Victorian Heritage Register
Official name	Melbourne Cricket Ground
Type	State Registered Place
Criteria	a, b, c, e, f, g
Designated	19 April 2001; 25 years ago
Reference no.	H1928
Heritage Overlay number	HO890

Website
- mcg.org.au

The Melbourne Cricket Ground (MCG), also known locally as the 'G, is a multi-purpose stadium located in Yarra Park in the suburb of East Melbourne, Victoria, Australia. The stadium primarily hosts Australian rules football and cricket as the home ground of multiple teams in the Australian Football League (AFL), as well as the Melbourne Renegades and the Melbourne Stars in the Big Bash League (BBL) and the Victorian cricket team in the Sheffield Shield. It also frequently hosts the Australian national cricket team. The ground was established by the Melbourne Cricket Club (MCC) in 1853, who continue to manage and operate the site. The stadium itself is owned by the Victorian Government through its appointed MCG Trust.

The MCG is the host venue of the annual AFL Grand Final, the world's second-highest attended league championship event, and the annual Boxing Day Test match. The stadium has hosted two Cricket World Cup finals (1992 and 2015). It was the venue for the opening and closing ceremonies in the 1956 Summer Olympics, where it also hosted athletics and the finals for hockey and football. It also hosted the opening and closing ceremonies, along with athletics, during the 2006 Commonwealth Games. The stadium has also hosted matches during the State of Origin rugby league series, football in the 2000 Summer Olympics, and the Bledisloe Cup. The MCG also hosted both the first Test match and the first One Day International, played between Australia and England in 1877 and 1971, respectively.

Since it was built in 1853, the MCG has undergone numerous renovations, with capacity of the stadium now standing at approximately 95,000 (with an additional 5,000 for standing-room only), bringing the total capacity to 100,024. It is the largest stadium in Australia, the eleventh-largest stadium globally, the second-largest cricket stadium by capacity and the largest stadium in the Southern Hemisphere. It is listed on both the Victorian Heritage Register and the Australian National Heritage List and is the home of the Australian Sports Museum.

== Early history ==
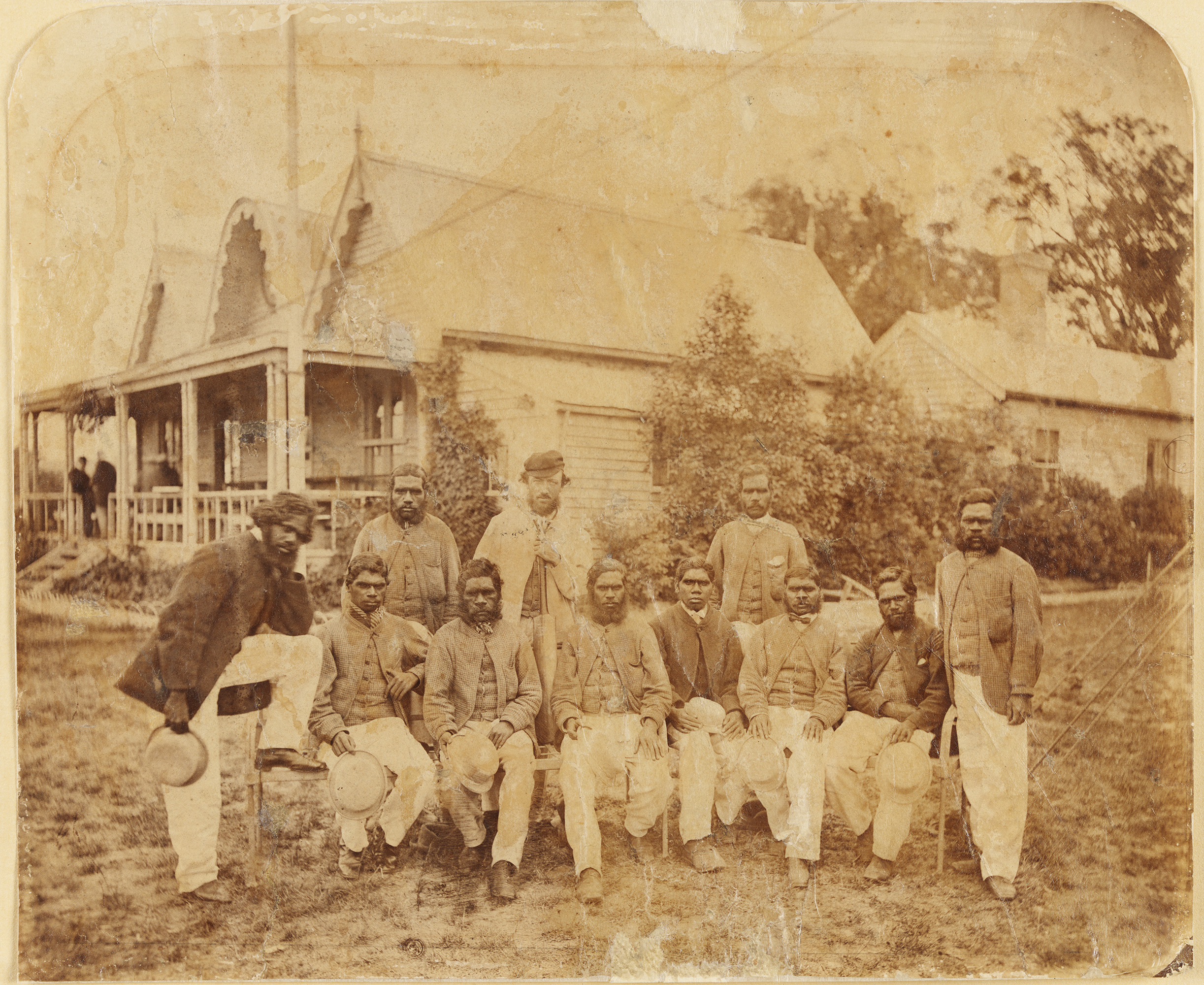
Aboriginal cricket team with captain-coach Tom Wills, December 1866. In the background is the original MCC pavilion, built in 1854.

The MCG is built atop a Wurundjeri camping ground and site of numerous corroborees. Founded in November 1838 the Melbourne Cricket Club (MCC) selected the current MCG site in 1853 after previously playing at several grounds around Melbourne. The club's first game was against a military team at the Old Mint site, at the corner of William and La Trobe Streets. Burial Hill (now Flagstaff Gardens) became its home ground in January 1839, but the area was already set aside for Botanical Gardens and the club was moved on in October 1846, to an area on the south bank of the Yarra about where the Herald & Weekly Times building is today. The area was subject to flooding, forcing the club to move again, this time to a ground in South Melbourne.

It was not long before the club was forced out again, this time because of the expansion of the railway. The South Melbourne ground was in the path of Victoria's first steam railway line from Melbourne to Sandridge (now Port Melbourne). Governor La Trobe offered the MCC a choice of three sites; an area adjacent to the existing ground, a site at the junction of Flinders and Spring Streets or a ten-acre (about 4 hectares) section of the Government Paddock at Richmond next to Richmond Park.

Between European settlement in 1835 and the early 1860s, this last option, which is now Yarra Park, was known as the Government or Police Paddock and served as a large agistment area for the horses of the Mounted Police, Border Police and Native Police. The north-eastern section also housed the main barracks for the Mounted Police in the Port Phillip district. In 1850 it was part of a 200-acre (81 ha) stretch set aside for public recreation extending from Governor La Trobe's Jolimont Estate to the Yarra River. By 1853 it had become a busy promenade for Melbourne residents.

An MCC sub-committee chose the Richmond Park option because it was level enough for cricket but sloped enough to prevent inundation. That ground was located where the Richmond, or outer, end of the current MCG is now.

At the same time the Richmond Cricket Club was given occupancy rights to six acres (2.4 hectares) for another cricket ground on the eastern side of the Government Paddock.

In 1861, a board of trustees was appointed to be responsible for the ground. Over the first forty years, most of the trustees were appointed by the MCC, giving the cricket club relative autonomy over the use of the ground. In 1906, the state governments' Lands ministry appointed five new trustees, putting the government-appointed trustees in the majority; and the government has appointed and overseen the trust since. This gives the state government, via the trust, a level of control over the ground's use.

At the time of the land grant, the government stipulated that the ground was to be used for cricket and cricket only. This condition technically remained until 1933 when the Melbourne Cricket Ground Act 1933 (No. 4149) widened its allowable uses. The 1933 act has been replaced by the Melbourne Cricket Ground Trust Act 1989 (No. 70 of 1989) and the Melbourne Cricket Ground Act 2009 (No. 15 of 2009).

In 1863, a corridor of land running diagonally across Yarra Park was granted to the Melbourne and Hobson's Bay Railway Company and divided Yarra Park from the river. The Mounted Police barracks were operational until the 1880s when it was subdivided into the current residential precinct bordered by Vale Street. The area closest to the river was also developed for sporting purposes in later years including Olympic venues in 1956.

== Stadium development ==
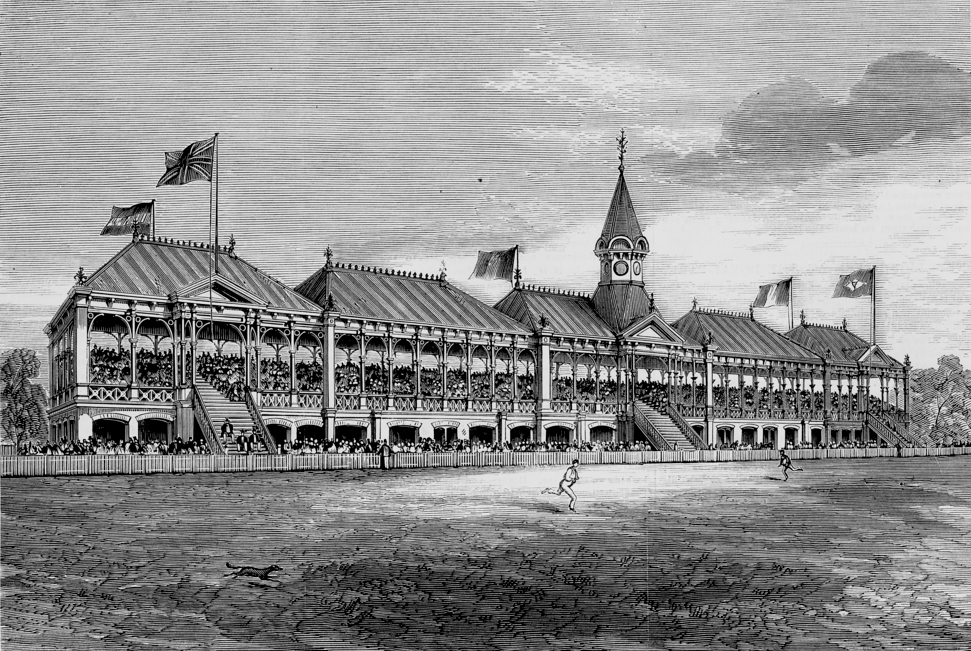
Grandstand built for the English cricket team's 1877 visit

The first grandstand at the MCG was the original wooden members' stand built in 1854, while the first public grandstand was a 200-metre long 6000-seat temporary structure built in 1861. Another grandstand seating 2000, facing one way to the cricket ground and the other way to the park where football was played, was built in 1876 for the 1877 visit of James Lillywhite's English cricket team. It was during this tour that the MCG hosted the world's first Test match.

In 1881, the original members' stand was sold to the Richmond Cricket Club for £55. A new brick stand, considered at the time to be the world's finest cricket facility, was built in its place. The foundation stone was laid by Prince George of Wales and Prince Albert Victor on 4 July and the stand opened in December that year. It was also in 1881 that a telephone was installed at the ground, and the wickets and goal posts were changed from an east–west orientation to north–south. In 1882 a scoreboard was built which showed details of the batsman's name and how he was dismissed.

When the Lillywhite tour stand burned down in 1884 it was replaced by a new stand which seated 450 members and 4500 public. In 1897, second-storey wings were added to 'The Grandstand', as it was known, increasing capacity to 9,000. In 1900 it was lit with electric light.

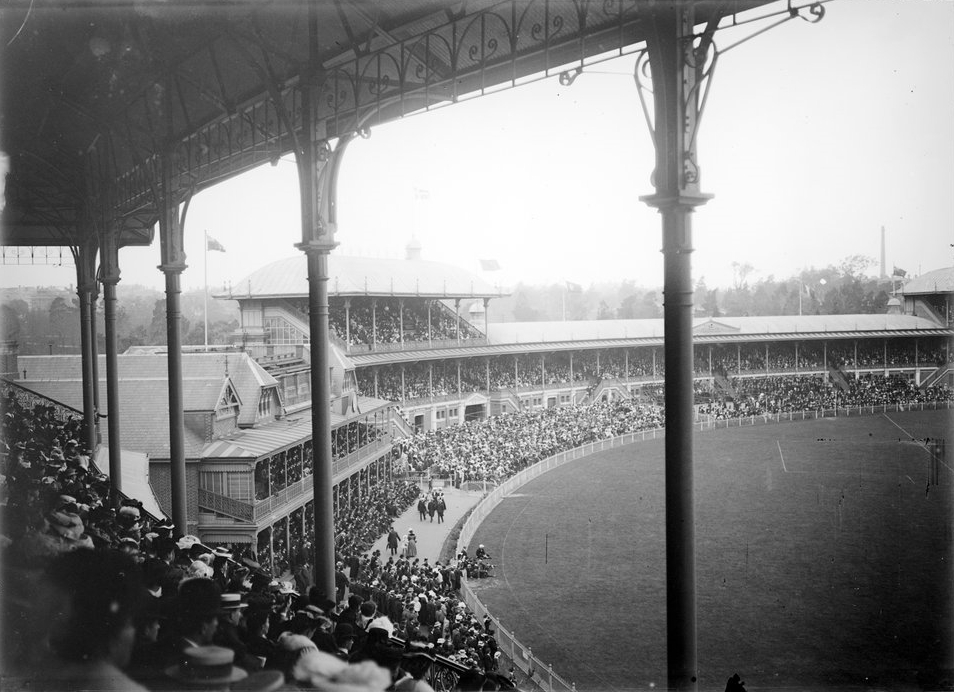
MCG, c. 1914. The 1881 members' stand is the smaller building on the left

More stands were built in the early 20th century. An open wooden stand was on the south side of the ground in 1904 and the 2084-seat Grey Smith Stand (known as the New Stand until 1912) was erected for members in 1906. The 4000-seat Harrison Stand on the ground's southern side was built in 1908 followed by the 8000-seat Wardill Stand in 1912. In the 15 years after 1897 the grandstand capacity at the ground increased to nearly 20,000, while the full ground capacity was almost 60,000.

In 1927, the second brick members' stand was replaced at a cost of £60,000. The Harrison and Wardill Stands were demolished to make way for the Southern Stand which was opened at the end of 1936. The Southern Stand, which spanned almost half of the field's circumference, seated 18,200 under cover and 13,000 in the open and was the main public area of the MCG. The maximum capacity of the ground under this configuration, as advised by the Health Department, was 84,000 seated and 94,000 standing.

The Northern Stand, also known as the Olympic Stand, was built to replace the old Grandstand for the 1956 Olympic Games. By Health Department regulations, this was to increase the stadium's capacity to 120,000; although this was revised down after the 1956 VFL Grand Final, which could not comfortably accommodate its crowd of 115,802. Ten years later, the Grey Smith Stand and the open concrete stand next to it were replaced by the Western Stand; the Duke of Edinburgh laid a foundation stone for the Western Stand on 3 March 1967, and it was completed in 1968; in 1986, it was renamed the W.H. Ponsford Stand in honour of Victorian batsman Bill Ponsford. This was the stadium's highest capacity configuration, and the all-time record crowd for a sporting event at the venue of 121,696 was set under this configuration in the 1970 VFL Grand Final.

The MCG was the home of Australia's first full colour video scoreboard, which replaced the old scoreboard in 1982, located on Level 4 of the Western Stand, which notably caught fire in 1999 and was replaced in 2000. A second video screen added in 1994 almost directly opposite, on Level 4 of the Olympic stand. In 1985, light towers were installed at the ground, allowing for night football and day-night cricket games.

During the 1980s, the Olympic Stand had corporate suites installed which led to the reduction of seating and standing capacity in the stand, the Ponsford Stand had seats installed on the ground level replacing the standing room and both the Southern Stand and Olympic Stand had their wooden bench seats removed and replaced with plastic bucket seats.

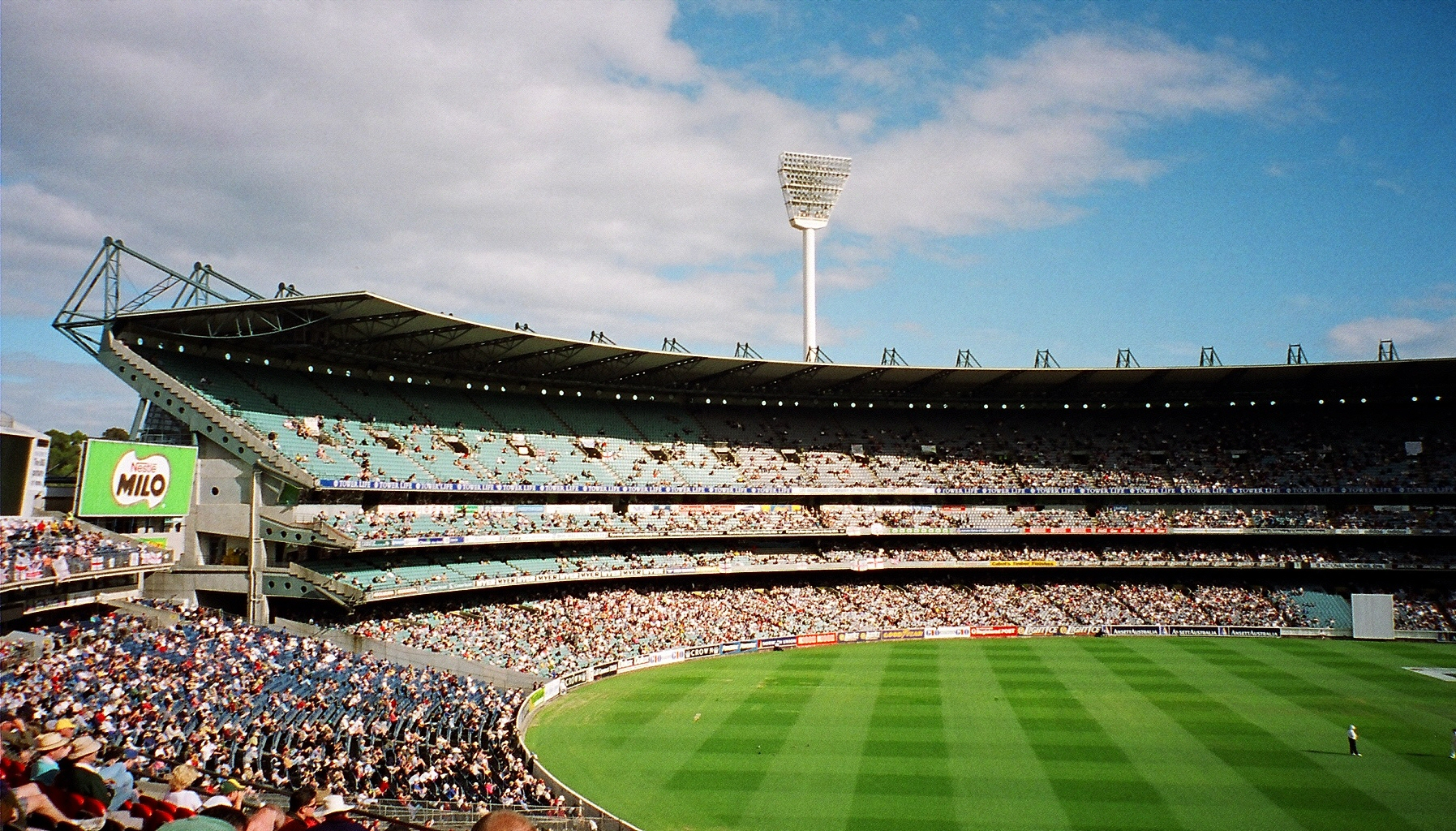
View of the Great Southern Stand during the 1998 Boxing Day Test match. The Olympic Stand is visible at the bottom left of the photo.

In 1988, inspections of the old Southern Stand found concrete cancer and provided the opportunity to replace the increasingly run-down 50-year-old facility. The projected cost of $100 million was outside what the Melbourne Cricket Club could afford so the Victorian Football League took the opportunity to part fund the project in return for a 30-year deal to share the ground. The new Great Southern Stand was completed in 1992, in time for the 1992 Cricket World Cup, at a final cost of $150 million by John Holland. It was renamed the Shane Warne Stand after Victorian bowler Shane Warne in 2022 shortly after his death.

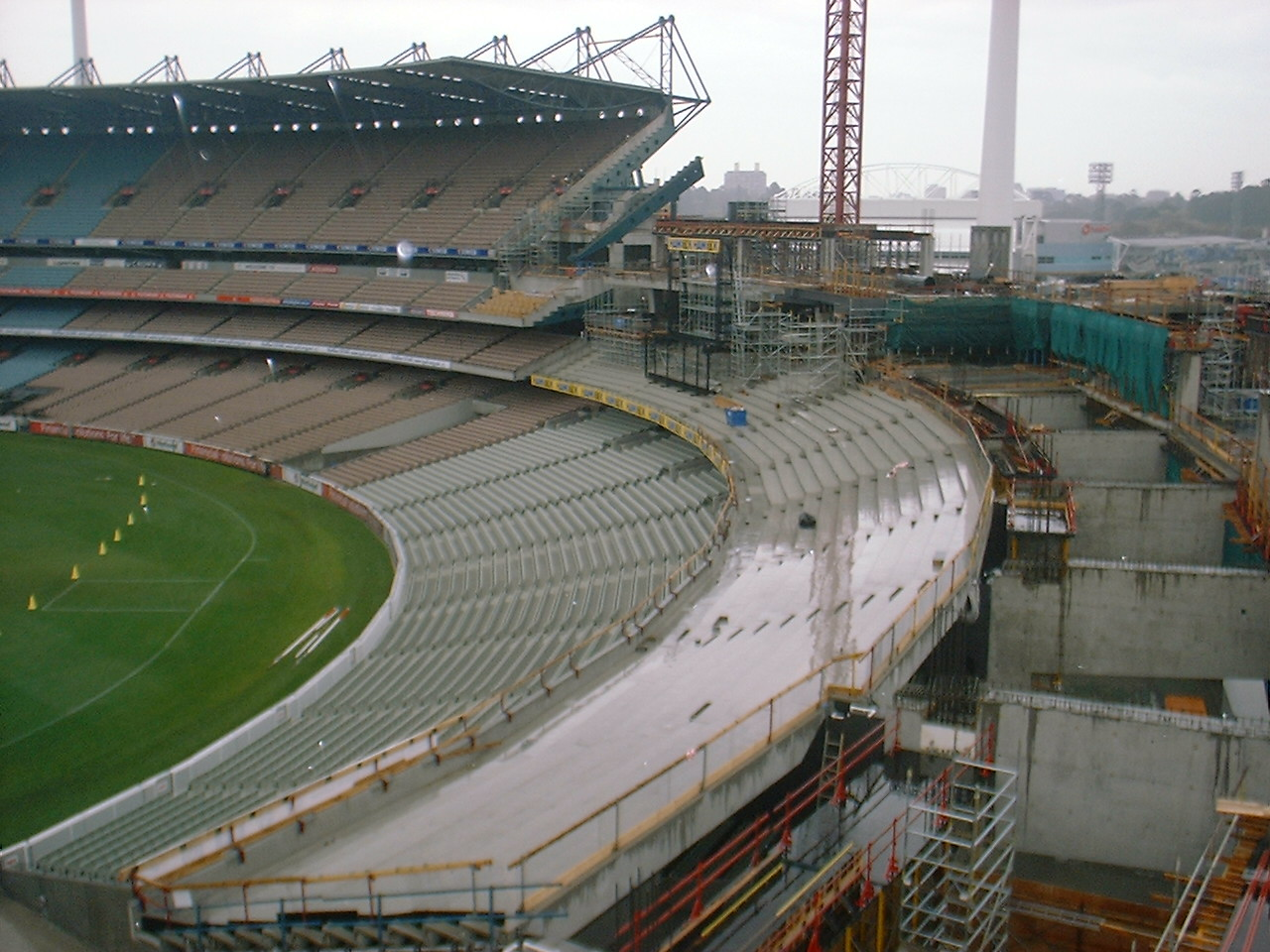
The W.H. Ponsford Stand undergoing reconstruction in 2003.

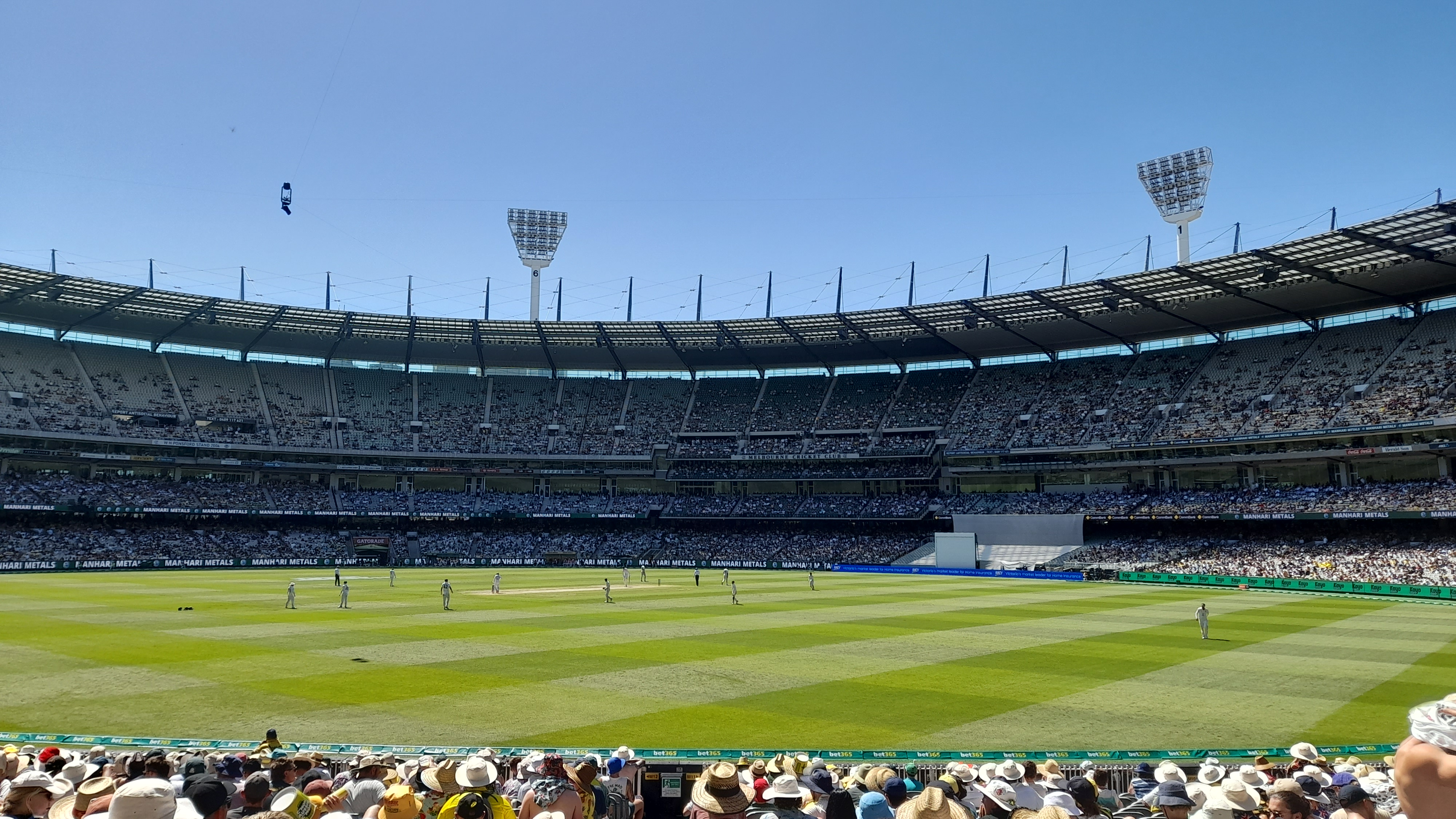
The Members Reserve as viewed from the Shane Warne Stand during the Australia vs South Africa Boxing Day Test in 2022.

The 1928 Members' stand, the 1956 Olympic stand and the 1968 W.H. Ponsford stand were demolished one by one between late 2003 to 2005 and replaced with a new structure in time for the 2006 Commonwealth Games. Despite now standing as a single unbroken stand, the individual sections retain the names of W.H. Ponsford, Olympic and Members Stands. The redevelopment cost exceeded A$400 million and pushed the ground's capacity to just above 100,000. Since redevelopment, the highest attendance has been 100,024 at the 2022 and 2023 AFL grand finals.

From 2011 until 2013, the Victoria State Government and the Melbourne Cricket Club funded a $55 million refurbishment of the facilities in the Great Southern Stand, including renovations to entrance gates and ticket outlets, food and beverage outlets, etc., without significantly modifying the stand. New scoreboards, more than twice the size of the original ones, were installed in the same positions in late 2013.

From November 2019 until February 2020 all the playing field lights, including those in the light towers, were replaced with LED sports lighting with the lighting under the roof and in two of the light towers completed in time for the Boxing Day Test against New Zealand.

== Cricket ==
=== Early years ===
The first cricket match at the venue was played on 30 September 1854, while the first inter-colonial cricket match to be played at the MCG was between Victoria and New South Wales in March 1856. Victoria had played Tasmania (then known as Van Diemen's Land) as early as 1851 but the Victorians had included two professionals in the 1853 team upsetting the Tasmanians and causing a cooling of relations between the two colonies. To replace the disgruntled Tasmanians the Melbourne Cricket Club issued a challenge to play any team in the colonies for £1000. Sydney publican William Tunks accepted the challenge on behalf of New South Wales although the Victorians were criticised for playing for money. Ethics aside, New South Wales could not afford the £1000 and only managed to travel to Melbourne after half the team's travel cost of £181 was put up by Sydney barrister Richard Driver.

The game eventually got under way on 26 March 1856. The Victorians, stung by criticism over the £1000 stake, argued over just about everything; the toss, who should bat first, whether different pitches should be used for the different innings and even what the umpires should wear.

Victoria won the toss but New South Wales captain George Gilbert successfully argued that the visiting team should decide who bats first. The MCG was a grassless desert and Gilbert, considering players fielded without boots, promptly sent Victoria into bat. Needing only 16 to win in the final innings, New South Wales collapsed to be 5 for 5 before Gilbert's batting saved the game and the visitors won by three wickets.

In subsequent years conditions at the MCG improved but the ever-ambitious Melburnians were always on the lookout for more than the usual diet of club and inter-colonial games. In 1861, Felix William Spiers and Christopher Pond, the proprietors of the Cafe de Paris in Bourke Street and caterers to the MCC, sent their agent, W.B. Mallam, to England to arrange for a cricket team to visit Australia.

Mallam found a team and, captained by Heathfield Stephenson, it arrived in Australia on Christmas Eve 1861 to be met by a crowd of more than 3000 people. The team was taken on a parade through the streets wearing white-trimmed hats with blue ribbons given to them for the occasion. Wherever they went they were mobbed and cheered by crowds to the point where the tour sponsors had to take them out of Melbourne so that they could train undisturbed.

Their first game was at the MCG on New Year's Day 1862, against a Victorian XVIII. The Englishmen also wore coloured sashes around their waists to identify each player and were presented with hats to shade them from the sun. Some estimates put the crowd at the MCG that day at 25,000. It must have been quite a picture with a new 6000 seat grandstand, coloured marquees ringing the ground and a carnival outside. Stephenson said that the ground was better than any in England. The Victorians however, were no match for the English at cricket and the visitors won by an innings and 96 runs.

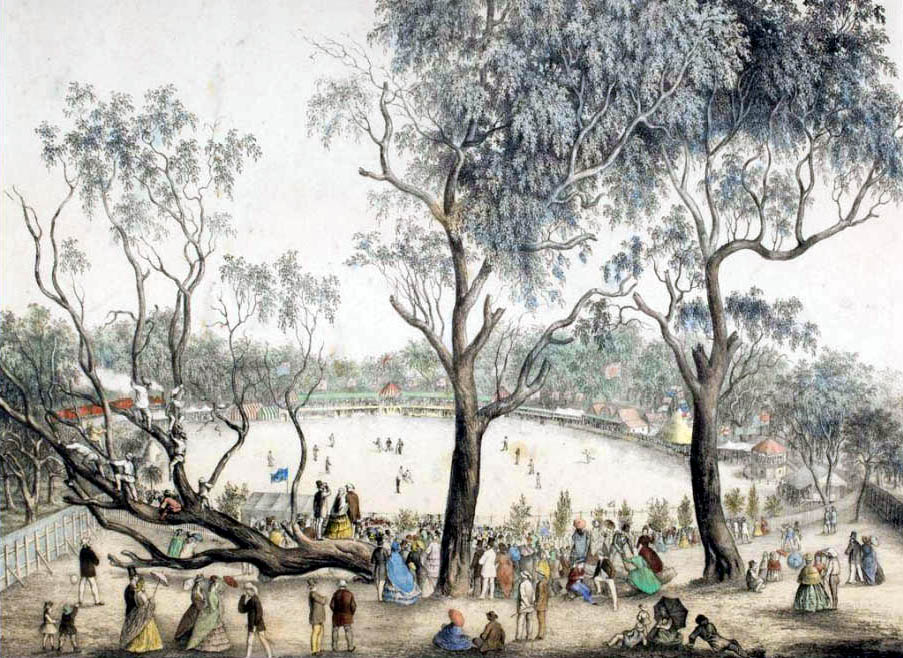
1864 match between Victoria and George Parr's touring All-England Eleven

Over the four days of the match more than 45,000 people attended and the profits for Speirs and Pond from this game alone was enough to fund the whole tour. At that time it was the largest number of people to ever watch a cricket match anywhere in the world. Local cricket authorities went out of their way to cater for the needs of the team and the sponsors. They provided grounds and sponsors booths without charge and let the sponsors keep the gate takings. The sponsors however, were not so generous in return. They quibbled with the Melbourne Cricket Club about paying £175 for damages to the MCG despite a prior arrangement to do so.

The last match of the tour was against a Victorian XXII at the MCG after which the English team planted an elm tree outside the ground.

Following the success of this tour, a number of other English teams also visited in subsequent years. George Parr's side came out in 1863–64 and there were two tours by sides led by W. G. Grace. The fourth tour was led by James Lillywhite.

On Boxing Day 1866 an Indigenous Australian cricket team played at the MCG with 11,000 spectators against an MCC team. A few players in that match were in a later team that toured England in 1868. Some also played in three other matches at the ground before 1869.

=== First Test match ===
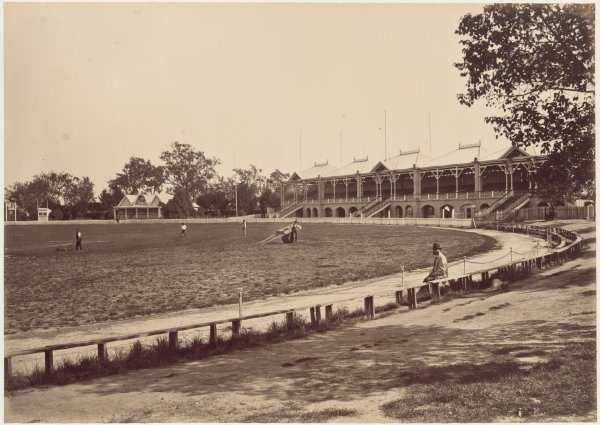
The MCG in 1878. The first Test cricket match was played at the MCG in 1877

Up until the fourth tour in 1877, led by James Lillywhite, touring teams had played first-class games against the individual colonial sides, but Lillywhite felt that his side had done well enough against New South Wales to warrant a game against an All Australian team.

When Lillywhite headed off to New Zealand he left Melbourne cricketer John Conway to arrange the match for their return. Conway ignored the cricket associations in each colony and selected his own Australian team, negotiating directly with the players. Not only was the team he selected of doubtful representation but it was also probably not the strongest available as some players had declined to take part for various reasons. Demon bowler Fred Spofforth refused to play because wicket-keeper Billy Murdoch was not selected. Paceman Frank Allan was at Warrnambool Agricultural Show and Australia's best all-rounder Edwin Evans could not get away from work. In the end only five Australian-born players were selected.

The same could be said for Lillywhite's team which, being selected from only four counties, meant that some of England's best players did not take part. In addition, the team had a rough voyage back across the Tasman Sea and many members had been seasick. The game was due to be played on 15 March, the day after their arrival, but most had not yet fully recovered. On top of that, wicket-keeper Ted Pooley was still in a New Zealand prison after a brawl in a Christchurch pub.

England was nonetheless favourite to win the game and the first ever Test match began with a crowd of only 1000 watching. The Australians elected Dave Gregory from New South Wales as Australia's first ever captain and on winning the toss he decided to bat.

Charles Bannerman scored an unbeaten 165 before retiring hurt. Sydney Cricket Ground curator, Ned Gregory, playing in his one and only Test for Australia, scored Test cricket's first duck. Australia racked up 245 and 104 while England scored 196 and 108 giving Australia victory by 45 runs. The win hinged on Bannerman's century and a superb bowling performance by Tom Kendall who took 7 for 55 in England's second innings.

A fortnight later there was a return game, although it was really more of a benefit for the English team. Australia included Spofforth, Murdoch and T.J.D. Cooper in the side but this time the honours went to England who won by four wickets.

Two years later Lord Harris brought another England team out and during England's first innings in the Test at the MCG, Fred Spofforth took the first hat-trick in Test cricket. He bagged two hauls of 6 for 48 and 7 for 62 in Australia's ten wicket win.

=== Cricket uses ===
Through most of the 20th century, the Melbourne Cricket Ground was one of the two major Test venues in Australia (along with the Sydney Cricket Ground), and it would host one or two Tests in each summer in which Tests were played; since 1982, the Melbourne Cricket Ground has hosted one Test match each summer. Until 1979, the ground almost always hosted its match or one of its matches over the New Year, with the first day's play falling somewhere between 29 December and 1 January; in most years since 1980 and every year since 1995, its test has begun on Boxing Day, and it is now a standard fixture in the Australian cricket calendar and is known as the Boxing Day Test. The venue also hosts one-day international matches each year, and Twenty20 international matches most years. No other venue in Melbourne has hosted a Test, and Docklands Stadium is the only other venue to have hosted a limited-overs international.

The Victorian first-class team plays Sheffield Shield cricket at the venue during the season. Prior to Test cricket being played on Boxing Day, it was a long-standing tradition for Victoria to host New South Wales in a first-class match on Boxing Day. Victoria also played its limited overs matches at the ground. Since the introduction of the domestic Twenty20 Big Bash League (BBL) in 2011, the Melbourne Stars club played its home matches at the ground until it merged with the Melbourne Renegades in 2026.It is set to become the home ground of the Unnamed Melbourne BBL franchise going forward. It is also the home ground of the Melbourne Stars Women team, which plays in the Women's Big Bash League (WBBL).

By the 1980s, the integral MCG pitch – grown from Merri Creek black soil – was considered the worst in Australia, in some matches exhibiting wildly inconsistent bounce which could see balls pass through as grubbers or rear dangerously high – a phenomenon which was put down to damage caused by footballers in winter and increased use for cricket during the summers of the 1970s. The integral pitch has since been removed and drop-in pitches have been cultivated and used since 1996, generally offering consistent bounce and a fair balance between bat and ball. The decade-and-a-half-old pitches degraded again through the late 2010s, seeing the pitch receive the first official International Cricket Council 'poor' rating by an Australian pitch in 2017, and saw another Sheffield Shield match abandoned in 2019; a new set of drop-in pitches will be grown and ready for use by the early 2020s.

=== Highlights and lowlights ===
The highest first-class team score in history was posted at the MCG in the Boxing Day match against New South Wales in 1926–27. Victoria scored 1107 in two days, with Bill Ponsford scoring 352 and Jack Ryder scoring 295.

One of the most sensational incidents in Test cricket occurred at the MCG during the Melbourne test of the 1954–55 England tour of Australia. Big cracks had appeared in the pitch during a very hot Saturday's play and on the rest day Sunday, groundsman Jack House watered the pitch to close them up. This was illegal and the story was leaked by The Age newspaper. The teams agreed to finish the match and England won by 128 runs after Frank Tyson took 7 for 27 in the final innings.

An incident in the second Test of the 1960–61 series involved the West Indies player Joe Solomon being given out after his hat fell on the stumps after being bowled at by Richie Benaud. The crowd sided with the West Indies over the Australians.

Not only was the first Test match played at the MCG, the first One Day International match was also played there, on 5 January 1971, between Australia and England. The match was played on what was originally scheduled to have been the fifth day of a Test match, but the Test was abandoned after the first three days were washed out. Australia won the 40-over match by 5 wickets. The next ODI was played in August 1972, some 19 months later.

In March 1977, a Centenary Test Match was held between Australia and England to mark the 100th anniversary of the first Test match. The match was the idea of former Australian bowler and MCC committee member Hans Ebeling who had been responsible for developing the cricket museum at the MCG. England's Derek Randall scored 174, Australia's Rod Marsh also got a century, Dennis Lillee took 11 wickets, and David Hookes, in his first Test, hit five fours in a row off England captain Tony Greig's bowling. Rick McCosker opened the batting for Australia and suffered a fractured jaw after being hit by a sharply rising delivery. He left the field but came back in the second innings with his head swathed in bandages. Australia won the match by 45 runs, exactly the same margin as the first Test in 1877.

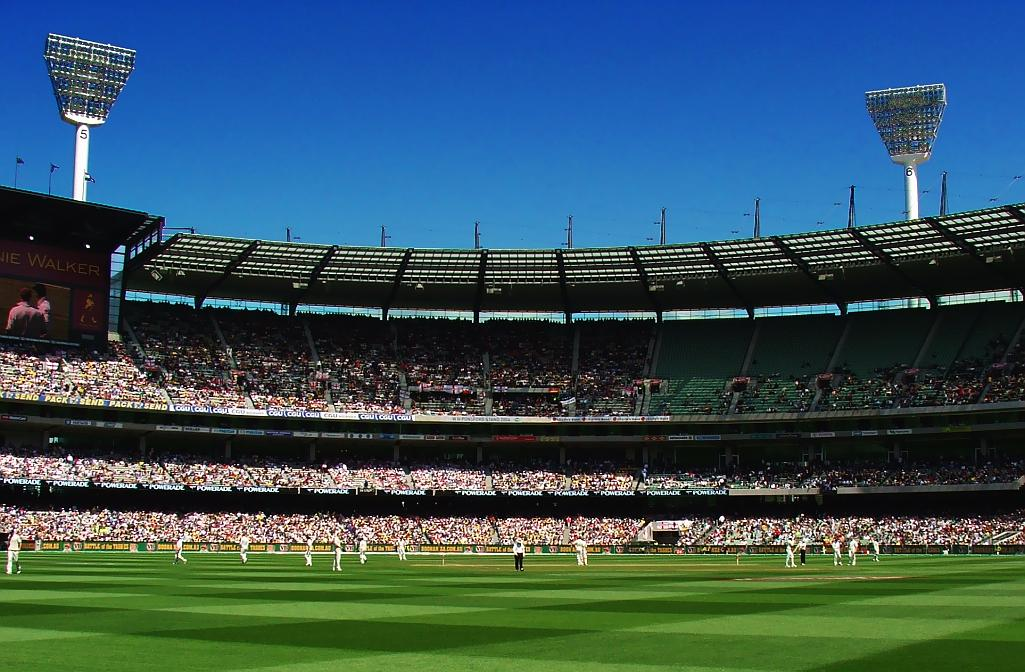
The second day of the 2006 Boxing Day Test match

Another incident occurred on 1 February 1981 at the end of a one-day match between Australia and New Zealand. New Zealand, batting second, needed six runs off the last ball of the day to tie the game. Australian captain, Greg Chappell instructed his brother Trevor, who was bowling the last over, to send the last ball down underarm to prevent the New Zealand batsman, Brian McKechnie, from hitting the ball for six. Although not in the spirit of the game, an underarm delivery was quite legal, so long as the arm was kept straight. The Laws of cricket have since been changed to prevent such a thing happening again. The incident has long been a sore point and source of banter between Australia and New Zealand.

In February and March 1985 the Benson & Hedges World Championship of Cricket was played at the MCG, a One Day International tournament involving all of the then Test match playing countries to celebrate 150 years of the Australian state of Victoria. Some matches were also played at Sydney Cricket Ground.

The MCG hosted the 1992 Cricket World Cup Final between Pakistan and England with a crowd of more than 87,000. Pakistan won the match after an all-round performance by Wasim Akram who scored 33 runs and took 3 wickets to make Pakistan cricket world champions for the first and, to date, only time.

During the 1995 Boxing Day Test at the MCG, Australian umpire Darrell Hair called Sri Lankan spin bowler Muttiah Muralitharan for throwing the ball, rather than bowling it, seven times during the match. The other umpire did not call him once and this caused a controversy, although Muralitharan was later called for throwing by other umpires in different matches.

The MCG is known for its great atmosphere, much of which is generated at Bay 13, situated almost directly opposite to the members stand. In the late 1980s, the crowd at Bay 13 would often mimic the warm up stretches performed by Merv Hughes. In a 1999 One-Day International, the behaviour of Bay 13 was so poor that Shane Warne, donning a helmet for protection, asked the crowd to settle down at the request of opposing England captain Alec Stewart.

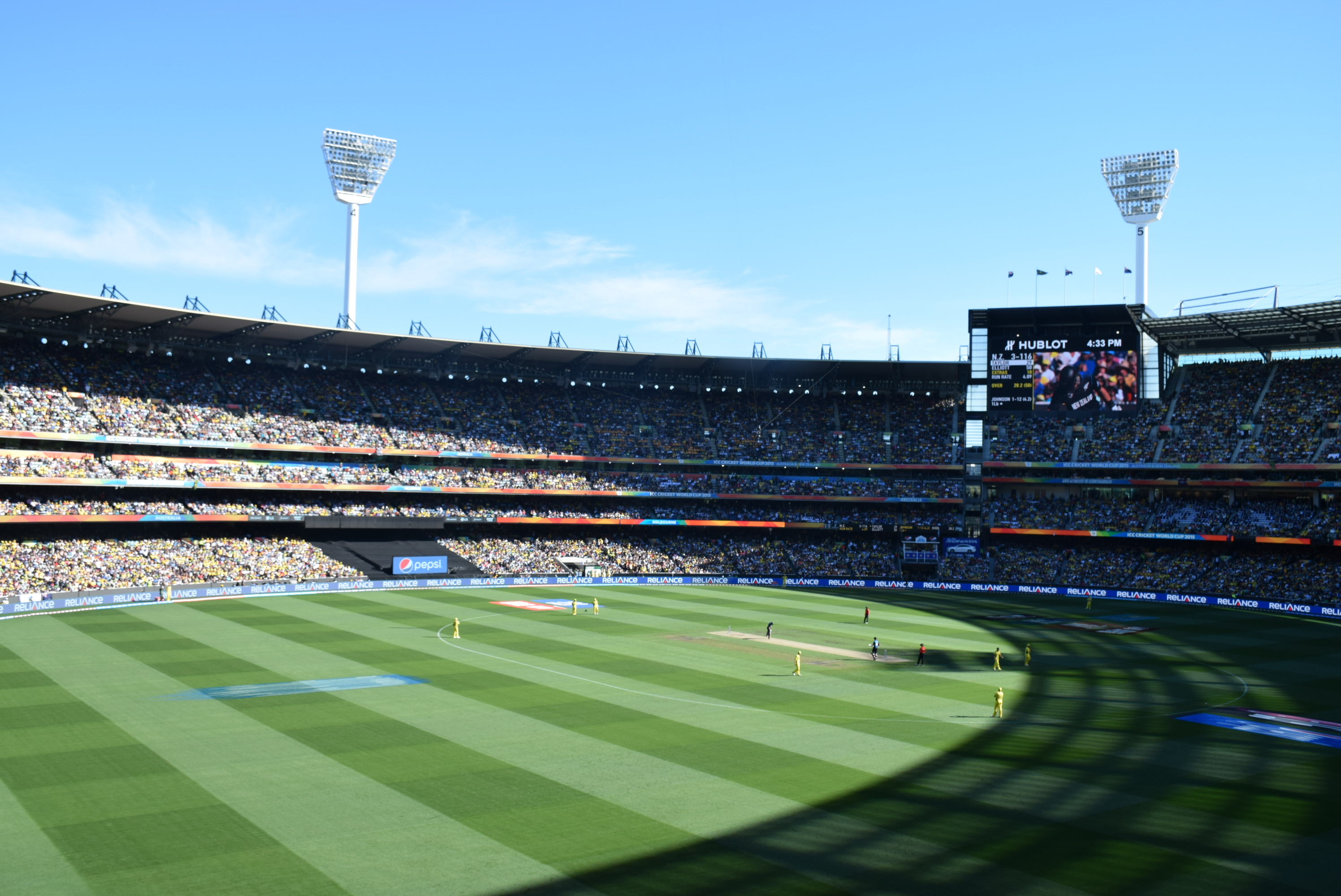
MCG during the 2015 Cricket World Cup Final with 93,013 in attendance

The MCG hosted three pool games as part of the 2015 ICC Cricket World Cup as well as a quarter-final, and then the final on 29 March. Australia comfortably defeated New Zealand by seven wickets in front of an Australian record cricket crowd of 93,013.

The 2020 ICC Women's T20 World Cup Final was held on International Women's Day between Australia and India. Australia won by 85 runs in front of a record crowd for women's cricket of 86,174.

A 150th anniversary Test match between Australia and England, commemorating the first Test match in 1877, is scheduled to be held from 11 to 15 March 2027 and is expected to be the first day-and-night men's Test at the ground.

Attendance records for cricket matches at the MCG
Number	Teams	Match type	Attendance	Date
1	Australia v England	Test	94,199	26 December 2025
2	Australia v New Zealand	2015 Cricket World Cup Final (ODI)	93,013	29 March 2015
3	Australia v England	Test	91,112	26 December 2013
4	Australia v West Indies	Test	90,800	11 February 1961
5	India v Pakistan	2022 Men's T20 World Cup (Super 12)	90,293	23 October 2022
6	Australia v England	Test	89,155	26 December 2006
7	Australia v England	Test	88,172	26 December 2017
8	Australia v England	Test	87,789	4 January 1937
9	Australia v India	Test	87,242	26 December 2024
10	England v Pakistan	1992 Cricket World Cup Final (ODI)	87,182	25 March 1992
11	India v South Africa	2015 Cricket World Cup Group match	86,876	22 February 2015
12	Australia v India	2020 ICC Women's T20 World Cup Final	86,174	8 March 2020

== Australian rules football ==
As of 2024, six AFL teams have deals in place to play home games at the MCG:

- Melbourne Football Club (1858–present) – ten home games per year.
- Richmond Football Club (1965–present) – ten home games per year.
- Essendon Football Club (1991–present) – four home games per year.
- Collingwood Football Club (1993–present) – nine home games per year.
- Hawthorn Football Club (2000–present) – six or seven home games per year.
- Carlton Football Club (2005–present) – five home games per year.

Additionally, the Geelong Football Club plays one home game per year at the MCG (two home games per year between 2017 and 2024), and the St Kilda Football Club plays one home game per year at the MCG; both teams predominantly play home games at Kardinia Park and Docklands Stadium respectively.

=== Origins ===
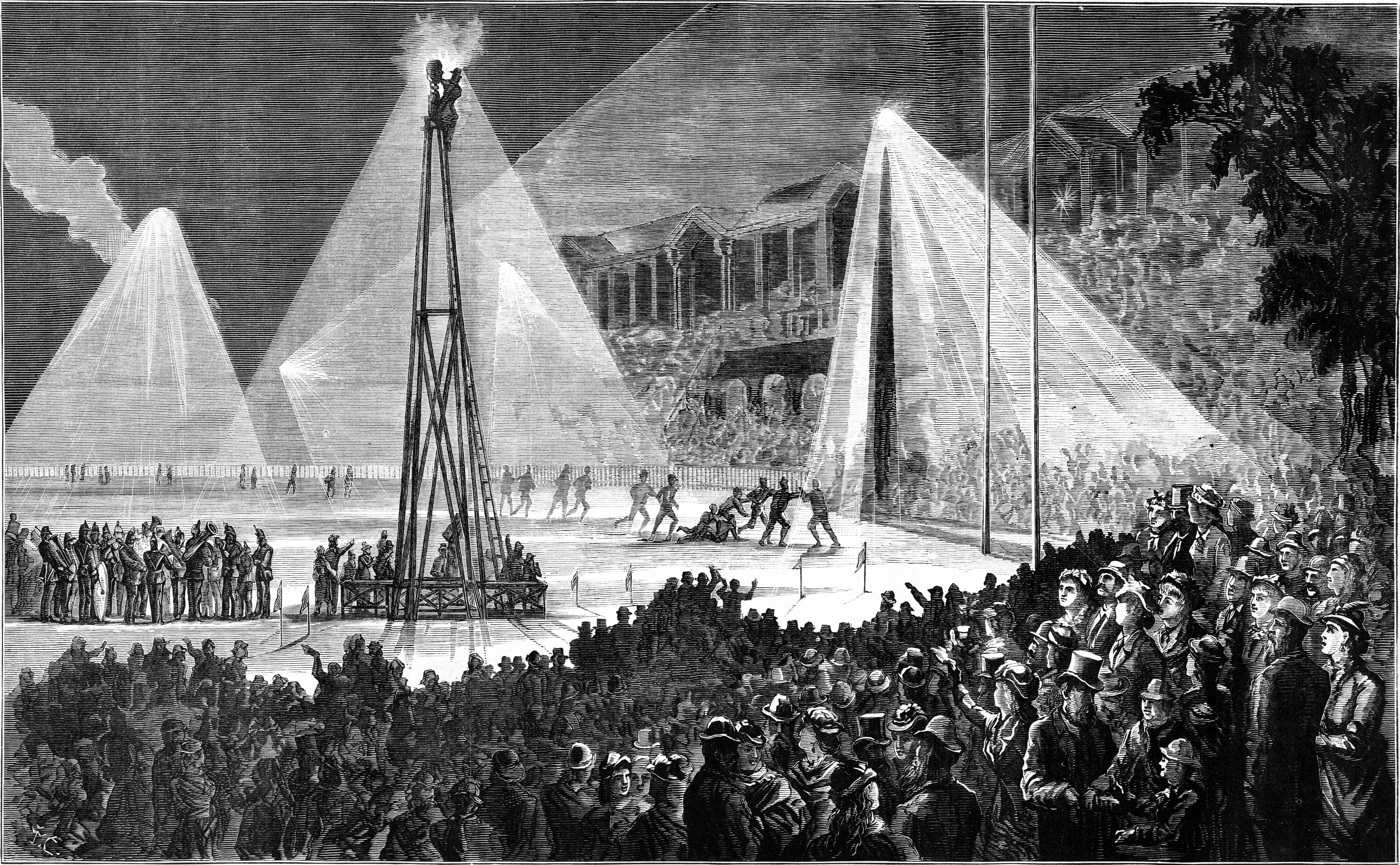
1879 Australian rules football match played under electric lights

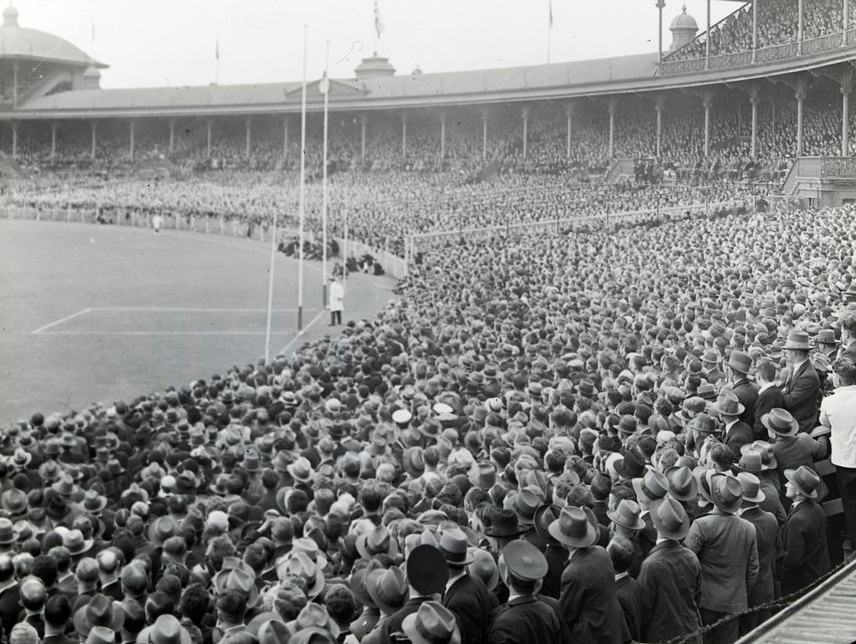
Crowd during a VFL football match, early 1900s

Despite being called the Melbourne Cricket Ground, the stadium has been and continues to be used much more often for Australian rules football. Spectator numbers for football are larger than for any other sport in Australia, and it makes more money for the MCG than any of the other sports played there.

Although the Melbourne Cricket Club members were instrumental in founding Australian Rules Football, there were understandable concerns in the early days about the damage that might be done to the playing surface if football was allowed to be played at the MCG. Therefore, football games were often played in the parklands next to the cricket ground, and this was the case for the first documented football match to be played at the ground. The match which today is considered to be the first Australian rules football, played between Melbourne Grammar and Scotch College over three Saturdays beginning 7 August 1858 was played in this area.

It wasn't until 1869 that football was played on the MCG proper, a trial game involving a police team. It was not for another ten years, in 1879, after the formation of the Victorian Football Association, that the first official match was played on the MCG and the cricket ground itself became a regular venue for football. Two night matches were played on the ground during the year under the newly invented electric light.

In the early years, the MCG was the home ground of Melbourne Football Club, Australia's oldest club, established in 1858 by the founder of the game itself, Thomas Wills. Melbourne won five premierships during the 1870s using the MCG as its home ground.

The first of nearly 3000 Victorian Football League/Australian Football League games to be played at the MCG was on 15 May 1897, with Melbourne beating Geelong 64 to 19.

Melbourne used the venue as its training base until 1984, before being required to move to preserve the venue's surface when North Melbourne began playing there.

=== Finals and grand finals ===
The VFL/AFL grand final has been played at the MCG almost every season since 1902. Exceptions occurred in 1942-1945, when the ground was used by the military during World War II; in 1991 as the construction of the Great Southern Stand had temporarily reduced the ground's capacity below that of Waverley Park; and in 2020-2021, when Victorian COVID-19 restrictions required the games to be moved to the Gabba in Queensland and Perth Stadium in Western Australia respectively. All three grand final replays were played at the MCG.

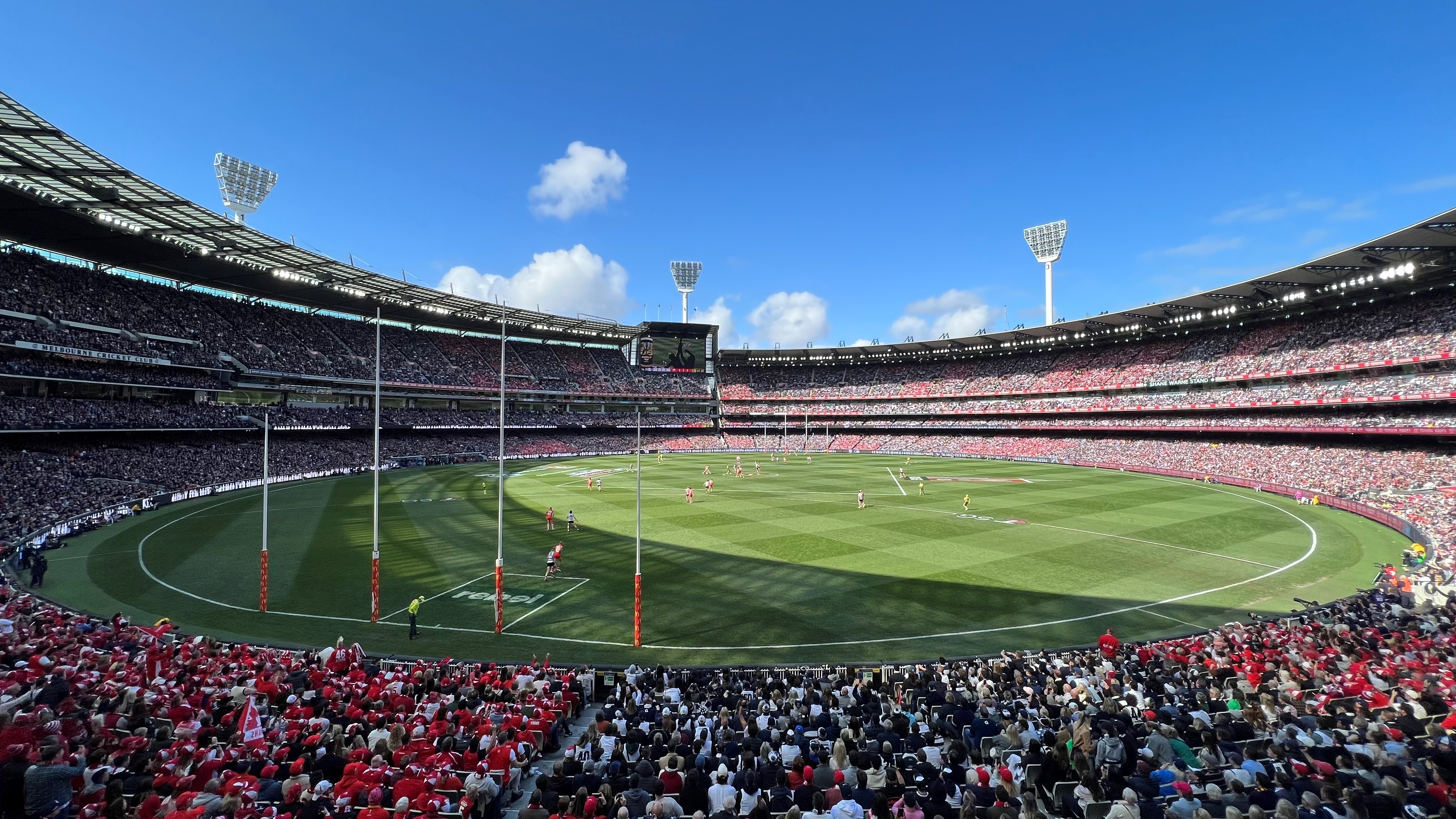
A sold out MCG during the 2022 AFL Grand Final; the match drew an attendance of 100,024

Before the MCG was fully seated, a grand final could draw attendances above 110,000. The record for the highest attendance in the history of the sport was set in the 1970 VFL Grand Final, with 121,696 in attendance.

Since being fully seated, grand final attendances are typically between 95,000 and 100,000, with the records of:

• 100,024 in both 2022 and 2023

• 100,023 in 2026

• 100,022 in Both 2018 and 2025

• 100,021 in 2017

In the modern era, most finals games held in Melbourne have been played at the MCG. Under the current contract, 10 finals (excluding the grand final) must be played at the MCG over a five-year period. Under previous contracts, the MCG was entitled to host at least one match in each week of the finals, which on several occasions required non-Victorian clubs to play "home" finals in Victoria. The MCG is contracted to host the grand final every year until 2059.

All Melbourne-based teams (and most of the time Geelong) play their "home" finals at the MCG, unless four Victorian teams win the right to host a final in the first week of the finals.

=== MCG and the VFL/AFL ===
For many years the VFL had an uneasy relationship with the MCG trustees and the Melbourne Cricket Club. Both needed the other, but resented the dependence. The VFL made the first move which brought things to a head by beginning the development of VFL Park at Mulgrave in the 1960s as its own home ground and as a potential venue for future grand finals. Then in 1983, president of the VFL, Allen Aylett started to pressure the MCG Trust to give the VFL a greater share of the money it made from using the ground for football.

After negotiations with the MCC in 1964, Richmond joined Melbourne playing their home games at the MCG from 1965.

In March 1983 the MCG trustees met to consider a submission from Aylett. Aylett said he wanted the Melbourne Cricket Club's share of revenue cut from 15 per cent to 10 per cent. He threatened to take the following day's opening game of the season, Collingwood vs Melbourne, away from the MCG. The money was held aside until an agreement could be reached.

Different deals, half deals and possible deals were done over the years, with the Premier of Victoria, John Cain, Jr., even becoming involved. Cain was said to have promised the VFL it could use the MCG for six months of the year and then hand it back to the MCC, but this never eventuated, as the MCG Trust did not approve it. In the mid-1980s, a deal was done where the VFL was given its own members area in the Southern Stand.

Against this background of political maneuvering, in 1985 North Melbourne became the third club to make the MCG its home ground. In the same year, North played in the first night football match at the MCG for almost 110 years, against Collingwood on 29 March 1985.

In 1986, only a month after Ross Oakley had taken over as VFL Commissioner, VFL executives met with the MCC and took a big step towards resolving their differences. Changes in the personnel at the MCC also helped. In 1983 John Lill was appointed secretary and Don Cordner its president.

Shortly after the Southern Stand opened in 1992, the Australian Football League moved its headquarters into the complex. The AFL assisted with financing the new stand and came to an agreement that ensures at least 45 AFL games are played at the MCG each year, including the Grand Final in September. Also in 1992, Essendon became the fourth AFL club to call the MCG home with Collingwood staging the majority of their home games at the MCG from 1994 onwards before fully moving from Victoria Park to the MCG in 2000. Carlton have also used the ground for up to five home games a year since 1992.

After the closure of Waverley Park, Hawthorn moved their home games to the MCG in 2000.

As of the end of 2011, Matthew Richardson holds the records for having scored the most goals on the MCG and as of 2021 Scott Pendlebury holds the record for playing the most matches. Two players have scored 14 goals for an AFL or VFL game in one match at the MCG, Gary Ablett Sr. in 1989 and 1993 and John Longmire in 1990.

Before an AFL match between Richmond and Carlton on 27 August 1999, the city end scoreboard caught on fire due to an electrical fault, causing the start of play to be delayed by half an hour.

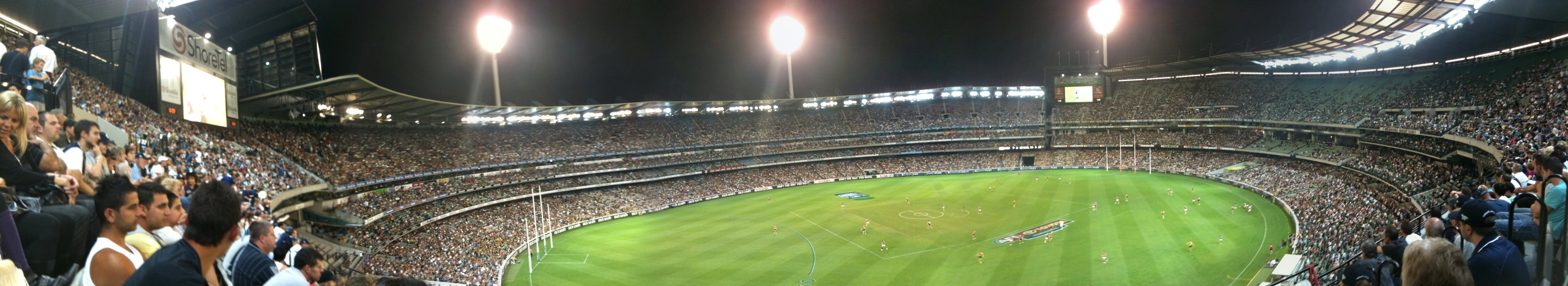
A panoramic view of the Melbourne Cricket Ground from level 4 of the Northern Stand, First game of the 2010 AFL Season between Richmond and Carlton

== World War II ==
During World War II, the government requisitioned the MCG for military use. From 1942 until 1945 it was occupied by (in order): the United States Army Air Forces, the Royal Australian Air Force, the United States Marine Corps and again the RAAF. Over the course of the war, more than 200,000 personnel were barracked at the MCG. From April to October 1942, the US Army's Fifth Air Force occupied the ground, naming it "Camp Murphy", in honour of officer Colonel William Murphy, a senior USAAF officer killed in Java. In 1943 the MCG was home to the legendary First Regiment of the First Division of the United States Marine Corps. The First Marine Division were the heroes of the Guadalcanal campaign and used the "cricket grounds", as the marines referred to it, to rest and recuperate. On 14 March 1943 the marines hosted a giant "get together" of American and Australian troops on the arena.

In 1977, Melbourne Cricket Club president Sir Albert Chadwick and Medal of Honor recipient, Colonel Mitchell Paige, unveiled a commemorative plaque recognizing the Americans' time at the ground.

== Olympic Games ==
The MCG's most famous moment in history was as the main stadium for the 1956 Olympic Games, hosting the opening and closing ceremonies, track and field events, and the finals in field hockey and soccer. The MCG was only one of seven possible venues, including the Melbourne Showgrounds, for the Games' main arena. The MCG was the Federal Government's preferred venue but there was resistance from the MCC. The inability to decide on the central venue nearly caused the Games to be moved from Melbourne. Prime Minister Robert Menzies recognised the potential embarrassment to Australia if this happened and organised a three-day summit meeting to thrash things out. Attending was Victorian Premier John Cain, Sr., the prime minister, deputy opposition leader Arthur Calwell, all State political leaders, civic leaders, Olympic officials and trustees and officials of the MCC. Convening the meeting was no small effort, considering the calibre of those attending and that many of the sports officials were only part-time amateurs.

As 22 November, the date of the opening ceremony, drew closer, Melbourne was gripped ever more tightly by Olympic fever. At 3 pm the day before the opening ceremony, people began to line up outside the MCG gates. That night a quarter of a million people were in the city to celebrate.

The MCG's capacity was increased by the new Olympic (or Northern) Stand, and on the day itself 103,000 people filled the stadium to capacity. A young up and coming distance runner was chosen to carry the Olympic torch into the stadium for the opening ceremony.

Although Ron Clarke had a number of junior world records for distances of 1500 m, one mile (1.6 km) and two miles (3 km), he was relatively unknown in 1956. Perhaps the opportunity to carry the torch inspired him because he went on to have a career of exceptional brilliance. At one stage he held the world record for every distance from two miles (3 km) to 20 km. His few failures came in Olympic and Commonwealth Games competition. Although favourite for the gold at Tokyo in 1964 he was placed ninth in the 5,000 metres race and the marathon and third in the 10,000 metres. He lost again in the 1966 Commonwealth Games and in 1968 at altitude in Mexico he collapsed at the end of the 10 km race.

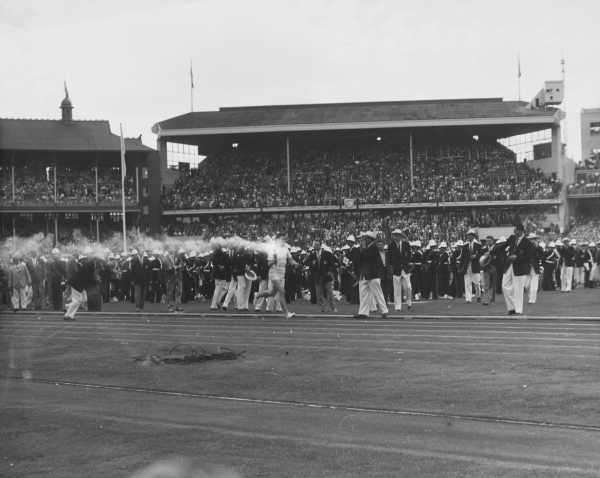
Ron Clarke carrying the Olympic Torch through the MCG at the 1956 Olympic Games' opening ceremony.

On that famous day in Melbourne in 1956 the torch spluttered and sparked, showering Clarke with hot magnesium, burning holes in his shirt. When he dipped the torch into the cauldron it burst into flame singeing him further. In the centre of the ground, John Landy, the fastest miler in the world, took the Olympic oath and sculler Merv Wood carried the Australian flag.

The Melbourne Games also saw the high point of Australian female sprinting with Betty Cuthbert winning three gold medals at the MCG. She won the 100 m and 200 m and anchored the winning 4 × 100 m team. Born in Merrylands in Sydney's west she was a champion schoolgirl athlete and had already broken the world record for the 200 m just before the 1956 Games. She was to be overshadowed by her Western Suburbs club member, the Marlene Matthews. When they got to the Games, Matthews was the overwhelming favourite especially for the 100 m a distance over which Cuthbert had beaten her just once.

Both Matthews and Cuthbert won their heats with Matthews setting an Olympic record of 11.5 seconds in hers. Cuthbert broke that record in the following heat with a time of 11.4 seconds. The world record of 11.3 was held by another Australian, Shirley Strickland who was eliminated in her heat. In the final Matthews felt she got a bad start and was last at the 50 metre mark. Cuthbert sensed Isabella Daniels from the USA close behind her and pulled out a little extra to win Australia's first gold at the Games in a time of 11.5 seconds, Matthews was third. The result was repeated in the 200 m final. Cuthbert won her second gold breaking Marjorie Jackson's Olympic record. Matthews was third again.

By the time the 1956 Olympics came around, Shirley Strickland was a mother of 31 years of age but managed to defend her 80 m title, which she had won in Helsinki four years before, winning gold and setting a new Olympic record.

The sensational incident of the track events was the non-selection of Marlene Matthews in the 4 x 100 m relay. Matthews trained with the relay team up until the selection was made but Cuthbert, Strickland, Fleur Mellor and Norma Croker were picked for the team. There was outrage at the selection which increased when Matthews went on to run third in both the 100 m and 200 m finals. Personally she was devastated and felt that she had been overlooked for her poor baton change. Strickland was disappointed with the way Matthews was treated and maintained it was an opinion held in New South Wales that she had baton problems. One of the selectors, Doris Magee from NSW, said that selecting Matthews increased the risk of disqualification at the change. But Cuthbert maintained that the selectors made the right choice saying that Fleur Mellor was fresh, a specialist relay runner and was better around the curves than Matthews.

The men did not fare so well. The 4 × 400 m relay team, including later IOC Committee member Kevan Gosper, won silver. Charles Porter also won silver in the high jump. Hec Hogan won bronze in the 100 m to become the first Australian man to win a medal in a sprint since the turn of the century and despite injury John Landy won bronze in the 1500 m. Allan Lawrence won bronze in the 10,000 m event.

Apart from athletics, the stadium was also used for the soccer finals, the hockey finals, the opening and closing ceremonies, and an exhibition game of baseball between the Australian National Team and a US armed services team at which an estimated crowd of 114,000 attended. This was the Guinness World Record for the largest attendance for any baseball game, which stood until a 29 March 2008 exhibition game between the Boston Red Sox and Los Angeles Dodgers at the Los Angeles Coliseum (also a former Olympic venue in 1932 and 1984) drawing 115,300.

The MCG was also used for another demonstration sport, Australian Rules. The Olympics being an amateur competition meant that only amateurs could play in the demonstration game. A combined team of amateurs from the VFL and VFA were selected to play a state team from the Victorian Amateur Football Association (VAFA). The game was played 7 December 1956 with the VAFA side, wearing white jumpers, green collars and the Olympic rings on their chests, winning easily 81 to 55. One of the players chosen for the VFA side was Lindsay Gaze (although he never got off the bench) who would go on to make his mark in another sport, basketball, rather than Australian Rules.

The MCG's link with its Olympic past continues to this day. Within its walls is the IOC-endorsed Australian Gallery of Sport and Olympic Museum.

Forty-four years later at the 2000 Summer Olympics in Sydney, the ground hosted several soccer preliminaries, making it one of a few venues ever used for more than one Olympics.

== Commonwealth Games ==
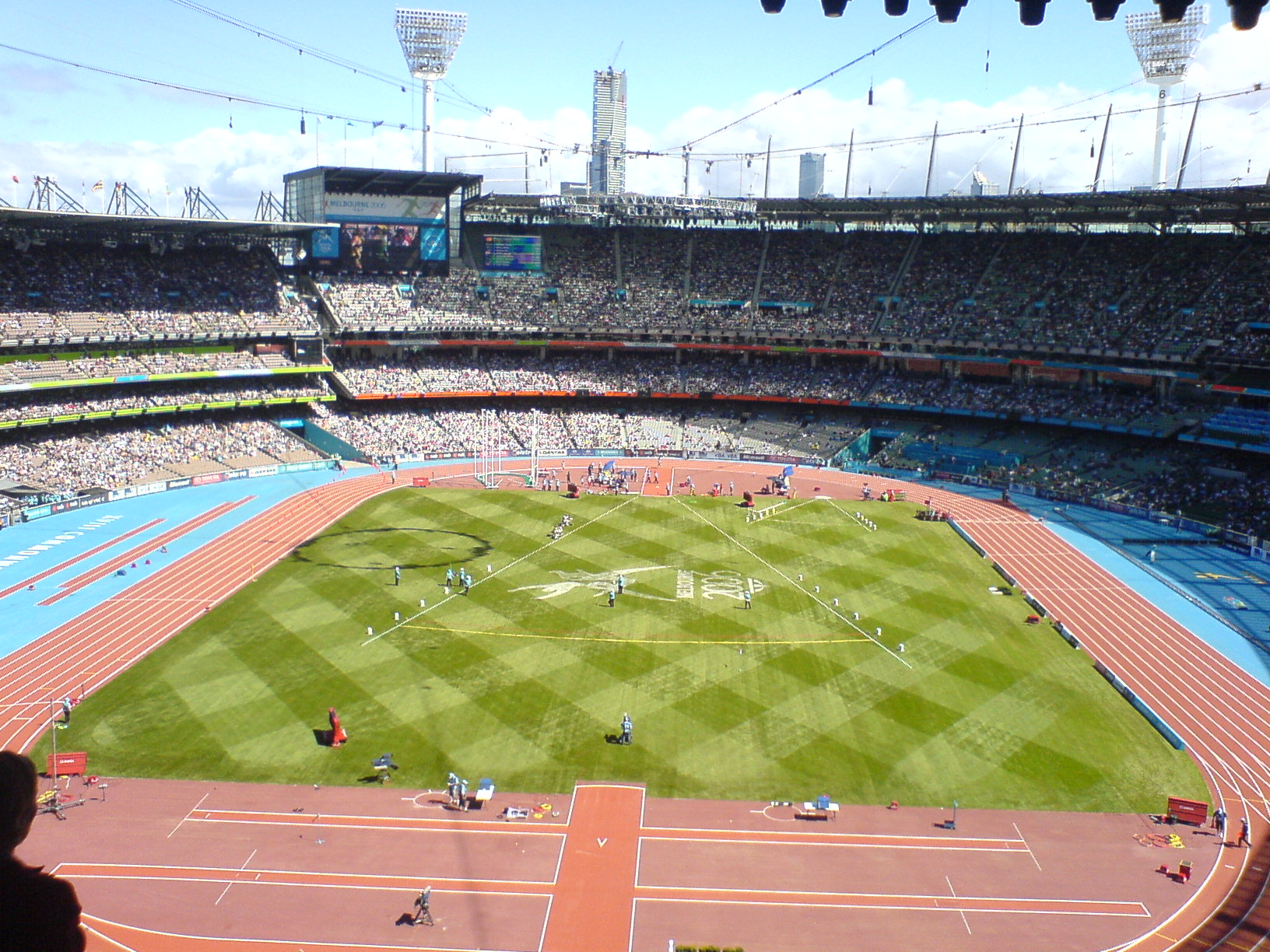
Melbourne Cricket Ground during the 2006 Commonwealth Games

The Opening and Closing Ceremonies of the 2006 Commonwealth Games were held at the MCG, as well as athletics events during the games. The games began on 15 March and ended on 26 March.

The seating capacity of the stadium during the games was 80,000. A total of 47 events were contested, of which 24 by male and 23 by female athletes. Furthermore, three men's and three women's disability events were held within the programme. All athletics events took place within the Melbourne Cricket Ground, while the marathon and racewalking events took place on the streets of Melbourne and finished at the main stadium.

The hosts Australia easily won the medals table with 16 golds and 41 medals in total. Jamaica came second with 10 golds and 22 medals, while Kenya and England were the next best performers. A total of eleven Games records were broken over the course of the seven-day competition. Six of the records were broken by Australian athletes.

== Rugby union ==
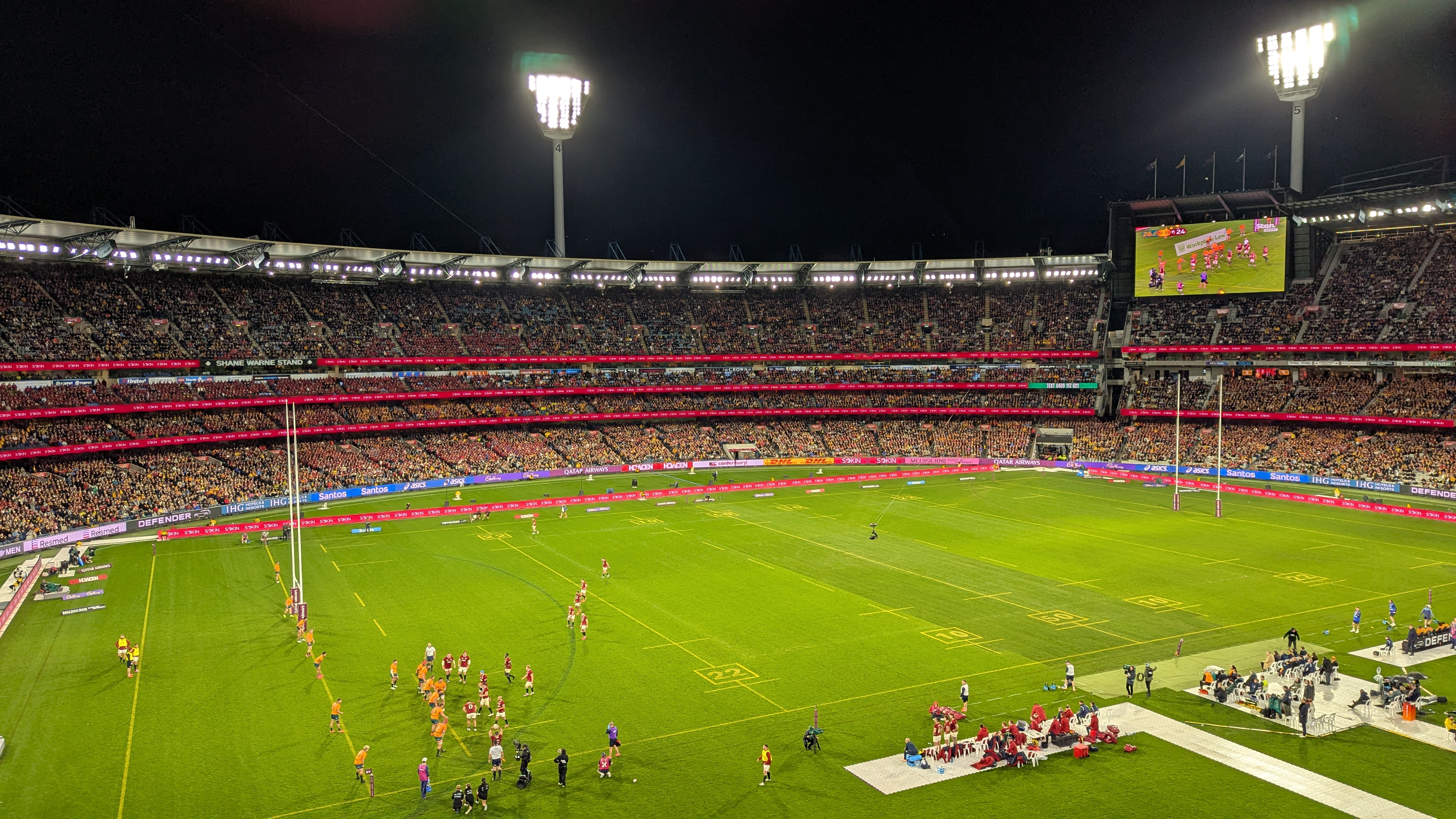
The British and Irish Lions compete against the Wallabies at the MCG in 2025

The first game of Rugby Union to be played on the ground was on Saturday, 29 June 1878, when the Waratah Club of Sydney played Carlton Football Club in a return of the previous year's contests in Sydney where the clubs had competed in both codes of football. The match, watched by a crowd of between 6,000 and 7,000 resulted in a draw; one goal and one try being awarded to each team.

The next Rugby match was held on Wednesday 29 June 1881, when the Wanderers, a team organised under the auspices of the Melbourne Cricket Club, played a team representing a detached Royal Navy squadron then visiting Melbourne. The squadron team won by one goal and one try to nil.

It was not until 19 August 1899 that the MCG was again the venue for a Union match, this time Victoria v the British Lions (as they were later to be called). During the preceding week the Victorians had held several trial and practice matches there, as well as several training sessions, despite which they were defeated 30–0 on the day before a crowd of some 7,000.

Nine years later, on Monday, 10 August 1908, Victoria was again the host, this time to the Australian team en route to Great Britain and soon to be dubbed the First Wallabies. Despite being held on a working day some 1,500 spectators attended to see the visitors win by 26–6.

On Saturday, 6 July 1912 the MCG was the venue, for the only time ever, of a match between two Victorian Rugby Union clubs, Melbourne and East Melbourne, the former winning 9–5 in what was reported to be '... one of the finest exhibitions of the Rugby game ever seen in Victoria.' It was played before a large crowd as a curtain raiser to a State Rules match against South Australia.

On Saturday 18 June 1921, in another curtain raiser, this time to a Melbourne-Fitzroy League game, a team representing Victoria was soundly beaten 51–0 by the South African Springboks in front of a crowd of 11,214.

It was nine years later, on Saturday 13 September 1930, that the British Lions returned to play Victoria, again before a crowd of 7,000, this time defeating the home side 41–36, a surprisingly narrow winning margin.

The first post war match at the MCG was on 21 May 1949 when the NZ Maoris outclassed a Southern States side 35–8 before a crowd of close to 10,000. A year later, on 29 July 1950, for the first and only time, Queensland travelled to Victoria to play an interstate match, defeating their hosts 31–12 before a crowd of 7,479. In the following year the MCG was the venue for a contest between the New Zealand All Blacks and an Australian XV. This was on 30 June 1951 before some 9,000 spectators and resulted in a convincing 56–11 win for the visitors.

Union did not return to the MCG until the late 1990s, for several night time Test matches, both Australia v New Zealand All Blacks as part of the Tri Nations Series. The first, on Saturday 26 July 1997, being notable for an attendance of 90,119, the visitors decisively winning 33–18 and the second, on Saturday 11 July 1998, for a victory to Australia of 24–16 in front of 75,127 spectators. Australia and New Zealand met again at the MCG during the 2007 Tri Nations Series on 30 June, the hosts again winning, this time by 20 points to 15 in front of a crowd of 79,322.

Australia returned to the MCG as part of the 2023 Rugby Championship. They were defeated by New Zealand 38–7 in front of a crowd of 83,944.

In 2025, Australia played the British and Irish Lions in the second test match of the Lions tour at the MCG. The Lions recovered from a 23–5 deficit to win 26–29 in front of a crowd of 90,307; this was the largest ever crowd for a British & Irish Lions match, and the MCG's largest ever rugby union crowd.

== Rugby league ==
Rugby league was first played at the ground on 15 August 1914, with the New South Wales team losing to England 15–21.

The first ever State of Origin match at the MCG (and second in Melbourne) was Game II of the 1994 series, and the attendance of 87,161 set a new record rugby league crowd in Australia. The MCG was also the venue for Game II of the 1995 State of Origin series and drew 52,994 the most of any game that series. The second game of the 1997 State of Origin series, which, due to the Super League war only featured Australian Rugby League-signed players, was played there too, but only attracted 25,105, the lowest in a series that failed to attract over 35,000 to any game.

The Melbourne Storm played two marquee games at the MCG in 2000. This was the first time that they had played outside of their normal home ground of Olympic Park Stadium which held 18,500 people. Their first game was held on 3 March 2000 against the St. George Illawarra Dragons in a rematch of the infamous 1999 NRL Grand Final. Dragons player Anthony Mundine said the Storm were 'not worthy premiers' and they responded by running in 12 tries to two, winning, 70–10, in front of 23,239 fans. This was their biggest crowd they had played against until 33,427 turned up to the 2007 Preliminary Final at Docklands Stadium which saw Melbourne defeat the Parramatta Eels, 26–10. The record home and away crowd record has also been overhauled, when a match at Docklands in 2010 against St George attracted 25,480 spectators. Their second game attracted only 15,535 spectators and was up against the Cronulla Sharks on 24 June 2000. Once again, the Storm won, 22–16.

It was announced in June 2014 that the ground would host its first State of Origin match since 1997. Game II of the 2015 series was played at the venue, with New South Wales defeating Queensland, 26–18, in front of an all-time record State of Origin crowd of 91,513. The attendance is 19th on the all time rugby league attendance list and the 4th highest rugby league attendance in Australia.

The MCG hosted its fifth State of Origin match on 6 June 2018. In front of a crowd of 87,122, the third-largest State of Origin crowd in Victoria, New South Wales defeated Queensland, 22–12.

The 2nd game of the 2024 State of Origin series was played at MCG on 26 June 2024 with New South Wales defeating Queensland, 38–18, in front of 90,084 spectators.

The 2nd game of the 2026 State of Origin series was played at the MCG on 17 June 2026 with the Queensland Maroons defeating the New South Wales Blues, 44-24. This game was the second time Queensland had defeated New South Wales at the MCG, and the game set a new all-time State of Origin attendance record with 91,671 attending.

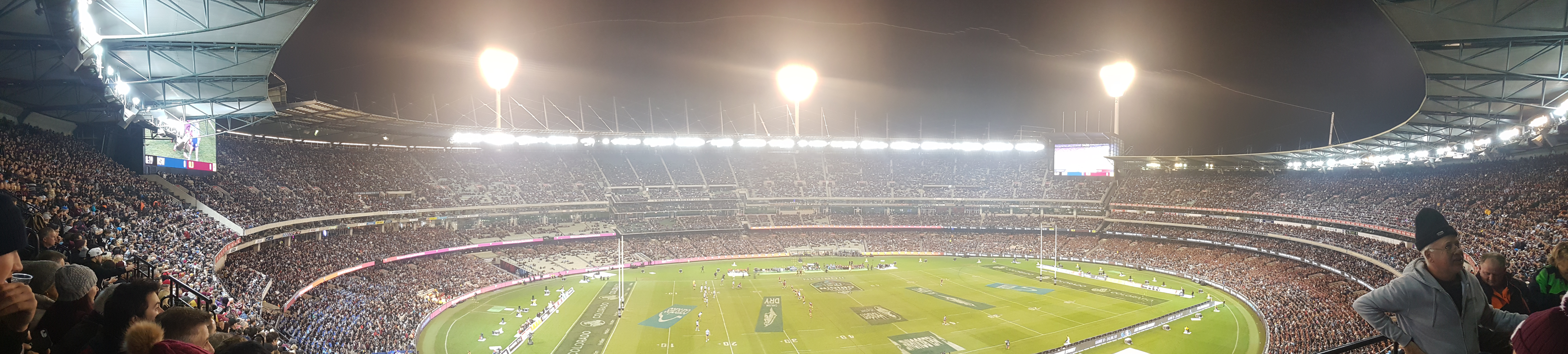
Panoramic photo of the MCG in Rugby League mode from the Great Southern Stand during the 1st game of the 2018 State of Origin series

== Soccer ==
On 9 February 2006 Victorian premier Steve Bracks and Football Federation Australia chairman Frank Lowy announced that the MCG would host a world class soccer event each year from 2006 until 2009 inclusive.

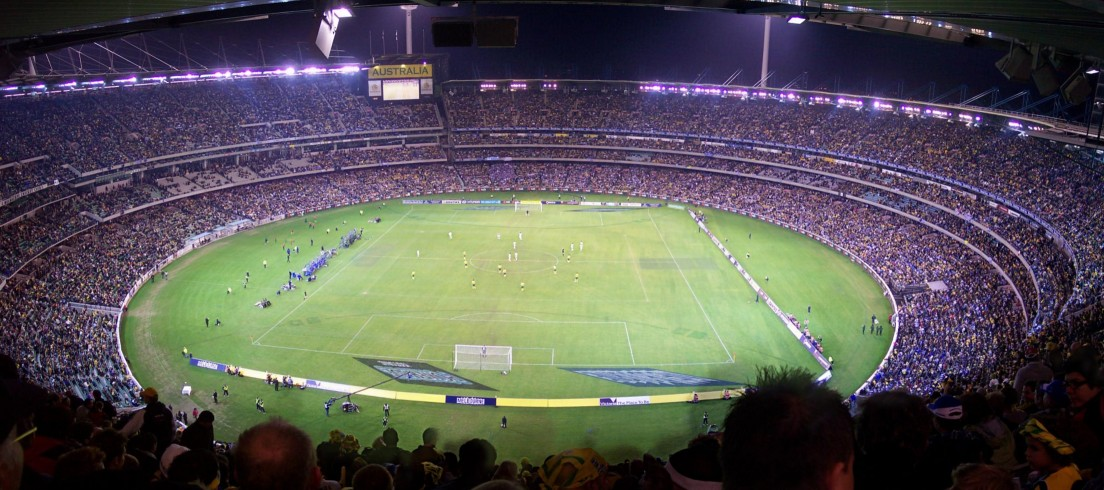
Australia and Greece playing an International Friendly at the MCG on 25 May 2006.

The agreement sees an annual fixture at the MCG, beginning with a clash between Australia and European champions Greece on 25 May 2006 in front of a sell-out crowd of 95,103, before Australia left to contest in the World Cup finals. Australia beat Greece 1–0. The Socceroos also hosted a match in 2007 against Argentina, losing 1–0, as well as 2010 FIFA World Cup qualification matches in 2009 against Japan, which attracted 81,872 fans as Australia beat Japan 2–1 via 2 Tim Cahill headers after falling behind 1–0 late in the 1st half. In 2010 it was announced that as a warm up to the 2010 FIFA World Cup which the Australians had qualified for, they would play fellow qualified nation New Zealand on 24 May at the MCG.

Other matches played at the MCG include the following:

- The Olympic final played between USSR and Yugoslavia on 8 December 1956
- An exhibition match between Australia and Juventus played on 13 June 1984
- A 1998 FIFA World Cup qualifier between Australia and Iran on Saturday 29 November 1997 with 95,000 in attendance. The match was drawn 2–2, with Iran progressing on the away goals rule.
- An exhibition match between Manchester United and Australia on 15 July 1999 with 60,000 people in attendance.
- A friendly match between Brazil B and Australia on 17 November 1999 with 70,795 in attendance.
- An Olympic Tournament group match between Italy and the Olyroos on 13 September 2000 with 93,252 in attendance. Plus other preliminary matches during the Olympics which also included quarter final and the Semi final between Chile and Cameroon who went on to win the gold medal.
- A 2002 FIFA World Cup qualifier between the Australia and Uruguay on 20 November 2001 with 84,656 in attendance. The Socceroos won 1–0, however Uruguay progressed after later winning the second leg 3–0.
- A friendly match between Australia and the then European champions, Greece – which was played as a warmup to the 2006 FIFA World Cup.
- A friendly match between Australia and Argentina with 70,171 in attendance – Argentina had a full strength side with superstars such as Lionel Messi and Carlos Tevez
- A friendly match between Australia and the All Whites as a warm up before the 2010 FIFA World Cup in which Australia won in the last play of the game.
- A pre-season friendly in July 2013 between A-League outfit Melbourne Victory and Premier League side Liverpool, as part of Liverpool's pre-season tour of Australia and South East Asia drawing a crowd of 95,446.
- The final match of the 2015 International Champions Cup in Australia, between Real Madrid and Manchester City, which drew a soccer MCG record crowd of 99,382
- Brasil Global Tour matches between Argentina and Brazil, and Australia and Brazil in June 2017.
- A friendly between Melbourne Victory and Manchester United on July 15, 2022.
- A friendly between Newcastle United F.C. and Tottenham Hotspur F.C. on May 22, 2024, as part of Global Football Week Melbourne. It was the first time two English teams played each other at the ground.
- Some of the 2032 Olympics games, including the quarter-final, are planned to be held at the venue.
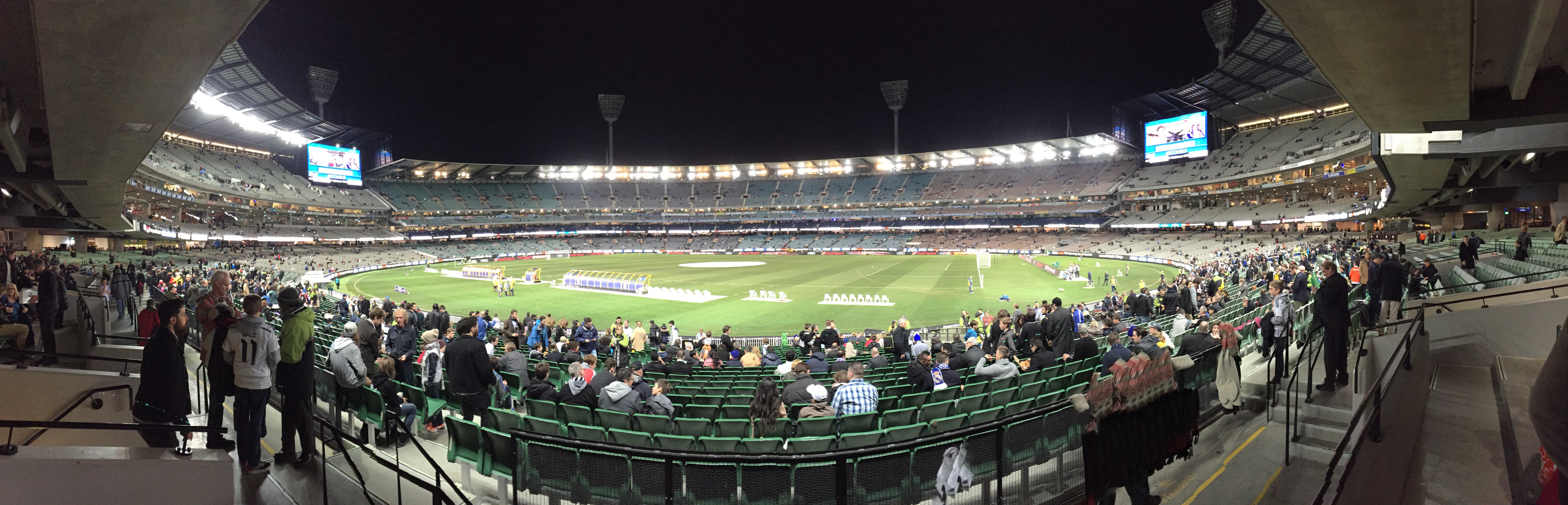
Panoramic image of the MCG in soccer mode ahead of a pre-season tournament match between Real Madrid and Manchester City (24 July 2015).

== Concerts ==
The MCG is a popular venue for concert acts, with the first rock concert held at the ground being one by David Cassidy in 1974. In 1978 David Bowie held a concert there. In 1993, Paul McCartney, U2, and Madonna held three concerts, with the highest attendances for a music concert at MCG, with 147,241 tickets sold. The Rolling Stones held concerts in 1995, Michael Jackson in 1996, the Three Tenors in 1997, Elton John and Billy Joel in 1998.

The MCG hosted the Police with special guests Fergie and Fiction Plane on Australia Day 2008, the first MCG concert in 10 years.

The MCG hosted Sound Relief, a concert donating all revenues to the Red Cross Victorian Bushfire Appeal with performances from Kings of Leon, Midnight Oil, Split Enz, Paul Kelly, Hunters & Collectors, Wolfmother, Jet and Bliss N Eso, among others. It was held on 14 March 2009 with 80,518 in attendance.

The MCG held a Guns N' Roses concert on 14 February 2017 with 73,756 in attendance.

The MCG held a free the Killers concert on 30 September 2017, after the 2017 AFL Grand Final.

On 3 December 2022, the MCG held a Guns N' Roses concert as part of the Guns N' Roses 2020 Tour.

On 10 December 2022, the MCG held a Billy Joel concert as part of the Billy Joel in Concert tour.

The MCG held an Eminem concert on 24 February 2019 with 80,708 tickets sold, at the time the highest attendance for a single concert at the MCG. The concert also marked the highest attended show of Eminem's career.

The MCG hosted two Ed Sheeran concerts on 2 and 3 March 2023 as part of the +–=÷x Tour. Playing in-the-round, the attendance on 2 March was 108,000, Sheeran's biggest concert and 3 March was 109,500, exceeding the previous concert attendance record set by Eminem.

The MCG hosted three Taylor Swift concerts on 16, 17, and 18 February 2024 as part of The Eras Tour. The three concerts were attended by 96,000 people each night, drawing a collective audience of 288,000. The shows broke the MCG's record for the most tickets sold by one artist at the venue, according to the promoter Frontier Touring.

In 2025, the MCG hosted two of the Australian dates of AC/DC's PWR/UP Tour, on 12 and 16 November. They were supported by hometown band Amyl and the Sniffers.

== Other uses ==
=== Tennis ===
In 1878 the Melbourne Cricket Club's Lawn Tennis Committee laid an asphalt court at the MCG and Victoria's first game of tennis was played there. A second court of grass was laid in 1879 and the first Victorian Championship played on it in 1880. The first inter-colonial championship was played in 1883 and the first formal inter-state match between NSW and Victoria played in 1884 with Victoria winning.

In 1889 the MCC arranged for tennis to be played at the Warehousemen's Cricket Ground (now known as the Albert Cricket Ground), at Albert Park, rather than at the MCG.

=== Cycling ===
It was at the MCG in 1869 that one of Australia's first bicycle races was held. The event was for velocipedes, crude wooden machines with pedals on the front wheels. In 1898 the Austral Wheel Race was held at the MCG attracting a crowd of 30,000 to see cyclists race for a total of £400 in prize money, with 1st, 2nd, and 3rd place winning £240, £120, and £40 respectively.

=== American football ===
The National Football League (NFL) played its first game at the ground in 2026 as part of a multiple-season deal for the NFL International Series. On 11 September, the Los Angeles Rams played the San Francisco 49ers in the season opener for both teams. The 49ers won 27–7 in front of a sell-out crowd of 100,021, the seventh-highest crowd for a regular-season game in NFL history.

=== Miscellaneous ===
- Queen Elizabeth II visited the MCG in 1954 twice for an assembly and display. She attended a Richmond versus Fitzroy match on 5 April 1970, and also attended the Commonwealth Games Opening Ceremony at the ground on 15 March 2006.
- A record for attendance at the grounds was set by religious leader Billy Graham whose event in 1959 was attended by at least 143,000 people.
- Pope John Paul II held a service at the MCG on 27 November 1986, and a celebration there of the Polish community the next day
- In November 2010, the MCG hosted the Starting Line and opening challenge, in which a team member abseiled down one of the light towers, for reality television series The Amazing Race Australia 1, the episode airing in 2011. The stadium also hosted a similar challenge for The Amazing Race US 39 on the race’s 10th leg, which was produced in October 2025 and aired in November 2026.
- On 6 October 2018, the MCG hosted WWE Super Show-Down.
- On 30 March 2022, the MCG hosted the state memorial service for Shane Warne.
- In 2022, the MCG featured as the extraction point on the reality series Hunted.

== General records ==
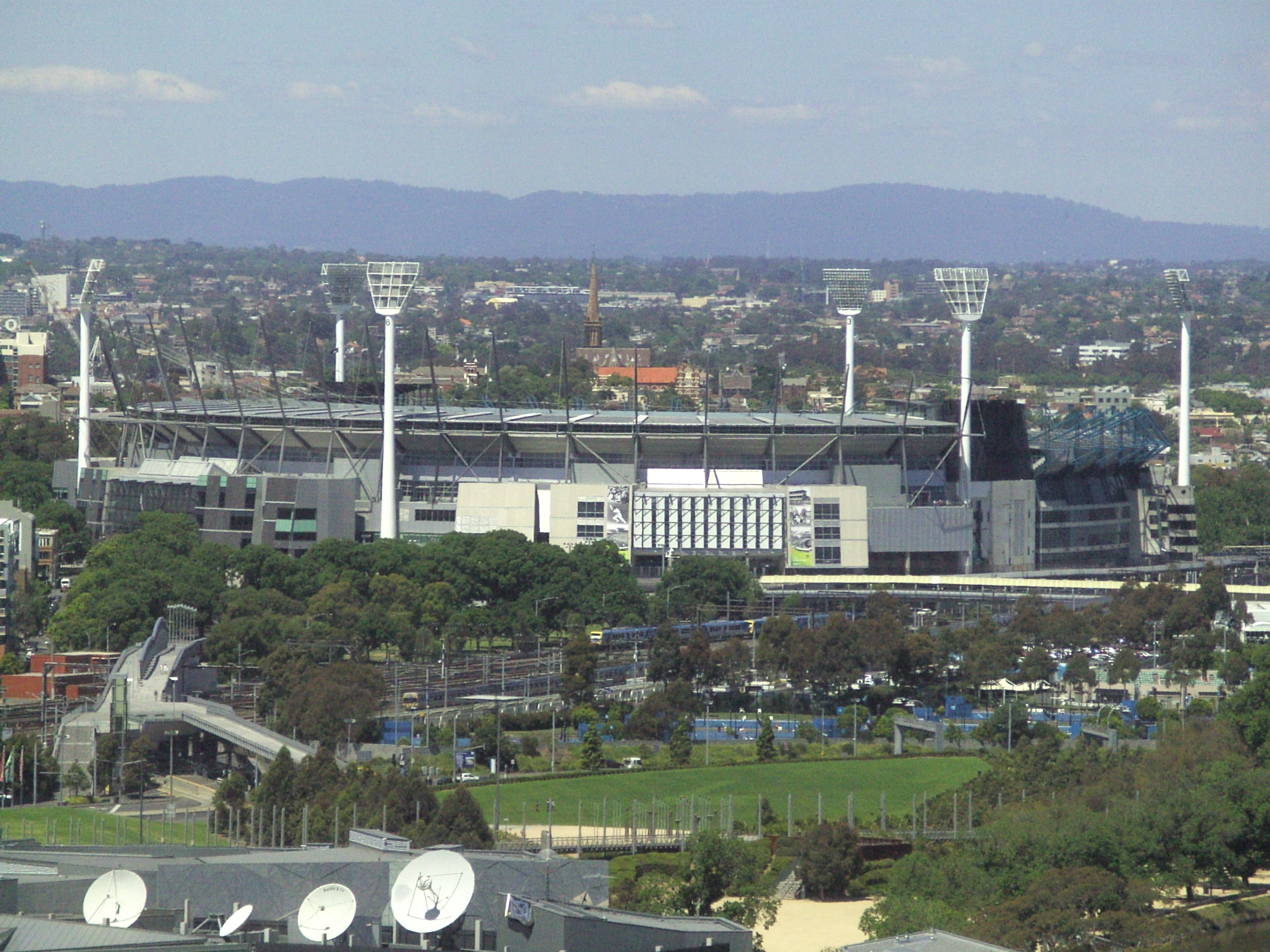
MCG from a city building.

=== Sporting records ===
- First ever Test Cricket match (Australia v England) – 1877
- First ever One day international Cricket match – 1971
- Highest first class cricket score – 1107 (Victoria v NSW, 1926)
- Australia's first international Lacrosse match (Australia v Canada, 1907, 30,000)
- Fastest ball bowled in a Cricket match in Australia, 3rd fastest in the world – 160.7 km/h (Shaun Tait, Australia v Pakistan, 5 February 2010)

=== Attendance records ===
All-time highest attendance records at the MCG
Number	Attendance	Event	Date
1	143,000	Billy Graham, Crusade	15 March 1959
2	121,696	VFL Grand Final, Carlton v Collingwood	26 September 1970
3	120,000	40th Eucharistic Congress	25 February 1973
4	119,195	VFL Grand Final, Carlton v Richmond	27 September 1969
5	118,192	VFL Grand Final, Hawthorn v St Kilda	25 September 1971

- Highest Australian religious event attendance – 143,750 (Billy Graham crusade, 1959)
- Highest VFL/AFL attendance at a home-and-away match – 99,256 (Melbourne v Collingwood, 1958).
- Highest VFL/AFL attendance at a final and highest Australian sporting event attendance – 121,696 (Collingwood v Carlton, 1970)
- Highest soccer crowd at MCG (Clubs International Friendly) – 99,382 (International Champions Cup, Manchester City v Real Madrid, 24 July 2015)
- Highest soccer crowd at MCG (National Team vs National Team) – 97,103 (Australia v Greece, 2006)
- Highest attendance in a single Test Cricket match across all five days – 373,691 (2024 Boxing Day Test, Australia v India)
- Highest single-day attendance in Test Cricket history – 94,199 (2025 Boxing Day Test, Day 1 – Australia v England)
- Highest One Day International Cricket crowd – 93,013 (2015 Cricket World Cup Final, Australia v New Zealand)
- Highest Twenty20 International Cricket crowd – 90,293 (2022 ICC Men's T20 World Cup, Super 12 round – India v Pakistan, 23 October 2022)
- Highest Twenty20 Domestic Cricket crowd – 80,883 (Melbourne Stars v Melbourne Renegades, 2015–16 Big Bash League season)
- Highest women's cricket crowd - 86,174 (2020 ICC Women's T20 World Cup Final, Australia Women v India Women)
- Highest State of Origin rugby league crowd – 91,513 (Game II, 17 June 2015)
- Highest rugby union crowd, and highest attendance in British & Irish Lions history – 90,307 (2025 British & Irish Lions tour to Australia, 26 July 2025)

=== Stadium records ===
- World's first all colour cricket scoreboard with instant replays
- World's first electronic sight screens
- World's first super sopper
- World's first scrolling signage at an oval-shaped ground
- First time an international Cricket match was played on a one-piece portable pitch, Boxing Day Test, 2000
- World's tallest floodlights

== Test cricket records ==
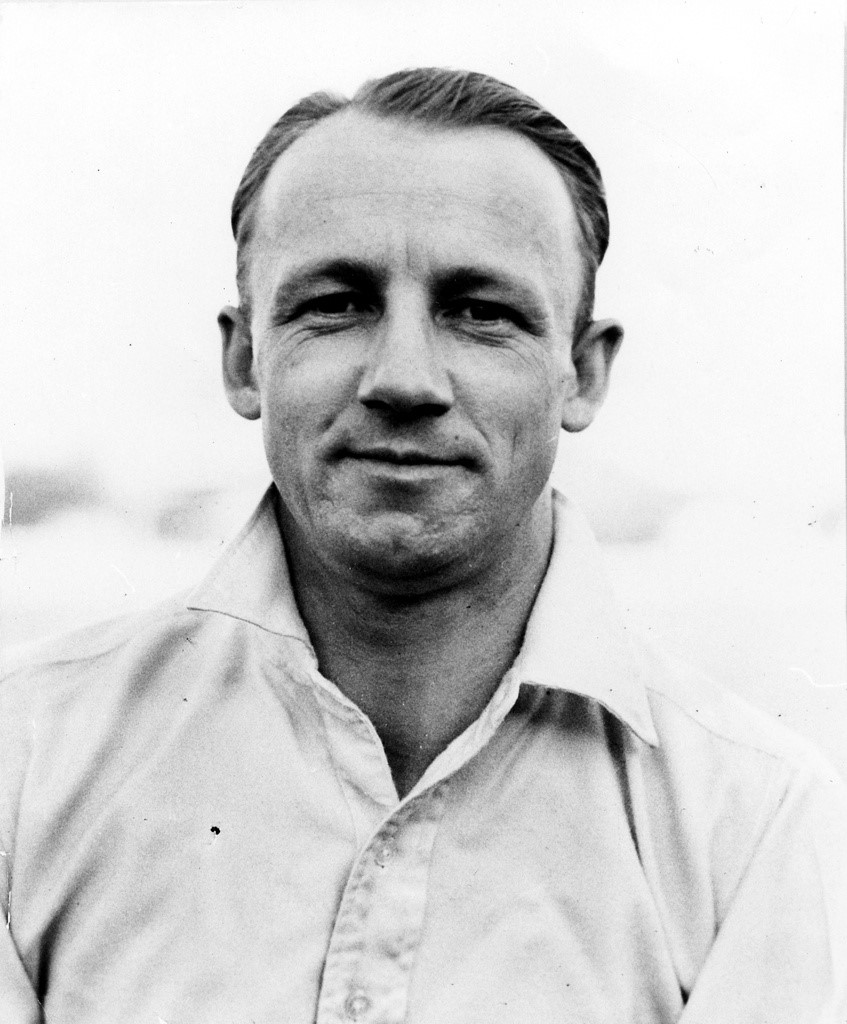
Don Bradman still holds the record for most runs at the Melbourne Cricket Ground.

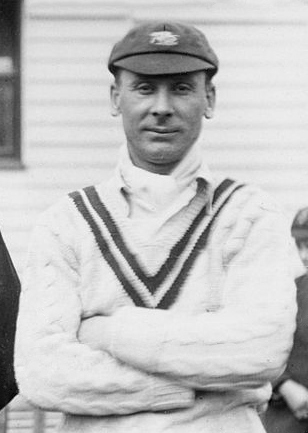
Jack Hobbs scored 1,178 runs in 18 innings at the ground; a record for non-Australians.

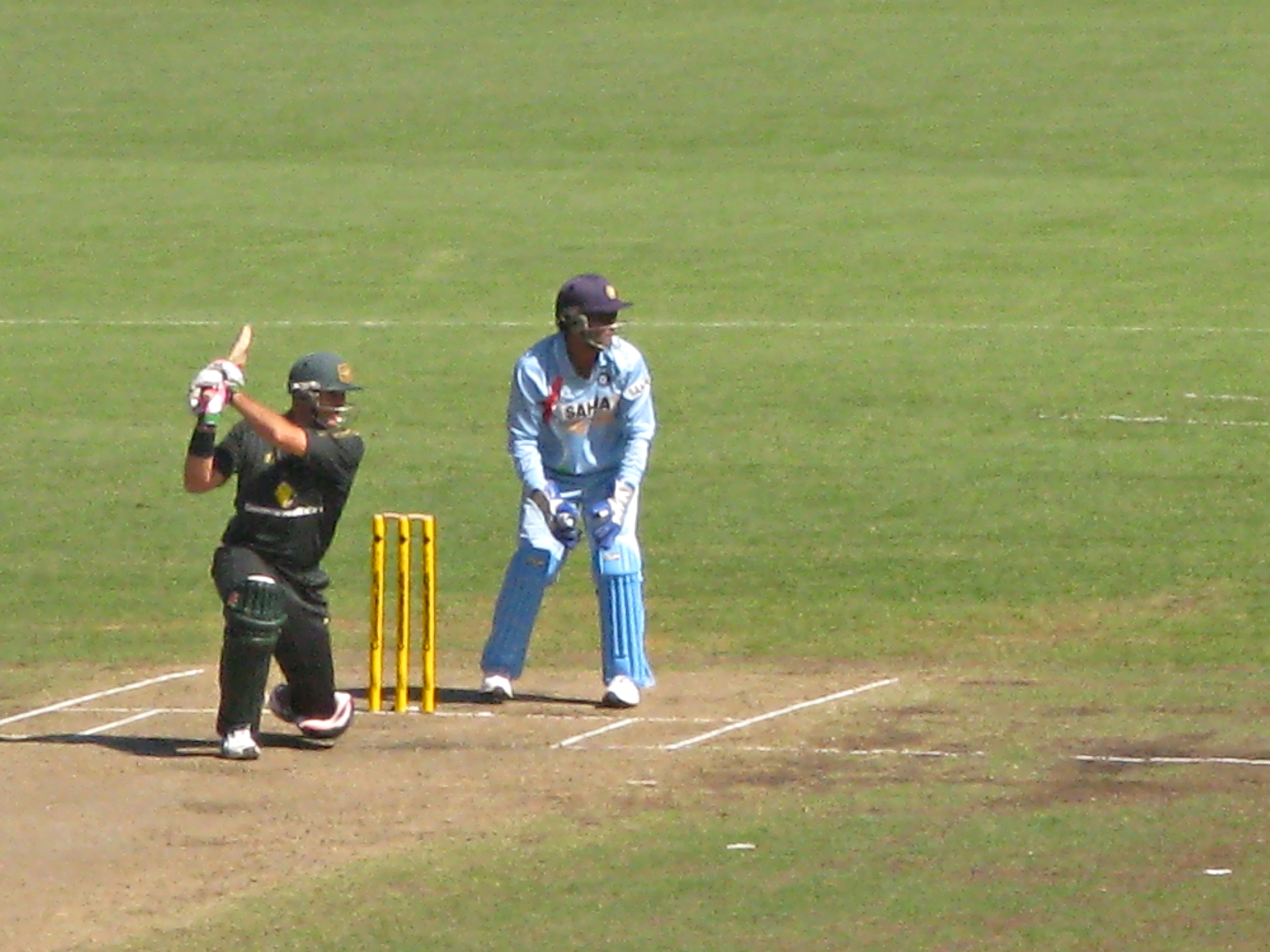
Matthew Hayden scored six centuries, second only to Bradman with nine.

=== Batting ===
Most career runs
Runs	Player	Period
1,671 (17 innings)	(Australia) Don Bradman	1928–1948
1,338 (28 innings)	(Australia) Ricky Ponting	1995–2011
1,284 (30 innings)	(Australia) Steve Waugh	1985–2003
1,279 (22 innings)	(Australia) Steve Smith	2010–2025
1,272 (36 innings)	(Australia) Allan Border	1978–1993

Most career runs (non-Australia)
Runs	Player	Period
1,178 (18 innings)	(England) Jack Hobbs	1908–1929
724 (7 innings)	(England) Herbert Sutcliffe	1925–1933
661 (15 innings)	(England) Colin Cowdrey	1954–1975
606 (11 innings)	(Cricket West Indies) Viv Richards	1975–1988
505 (12 innings)	(England) Wally Hammond	1928–1947

Highest individual scores
Runs	Player	Date
307 v. England	(Australia) Bob Cowper	11 Feb 1966
270 v. England	(Australia) Don Bradman	1 Jan 1937
268 v. Pakistan	(Australia) Graham Yallop	26 Dec 1983
257 v. India	(Australia) Ricky Ponting	26 Dec 2003
250 v. England	(Australia) Justin Langer	26 Dec 2002

Most centuries
Centuries	Player	Period
9 (17 innings)	(Australia) Don Bradman	1928–1948
6 (19 innings)	(Australia) Matthew Hayden	1996–2008
5 (18 innings)	(England) Jack Hobbs	1908–1929
5 (19 innings)	(Australia) Steve Smith	2010–2024
4 (7 innings)	(England) Herbert Sutcliffe	1925–1933
4 (13 innings)	(Australia) Bill Lawry	1962–1971
4 (28 innings)	(Australia) Ricky Ponting	1995–2011
4 (31 innings)	(Australia) Greg Chappell	1971–1983
4 (36 innings)	(Australia) Allan Border	1978–1993

Highest batting average (3+ matches)
Average	Player	Period
128.53 (17 innings, 4 NO)	(Australia) Don Bradman	1928–1948
103.42 (7 innings, 0 NO)	(England) Herbert Sutcliffe	1925–1933
101.20 (5 innings, 0 NO)	(Australia) Bob Cowper	1964–1968
87.00 (6 innings, 1 NO)	(England) Alastair Cook	2006–2017
83.20 (7 innings, 2 NO)	(Australia) Jack Gregory	1920–1925

=== Bowling ===
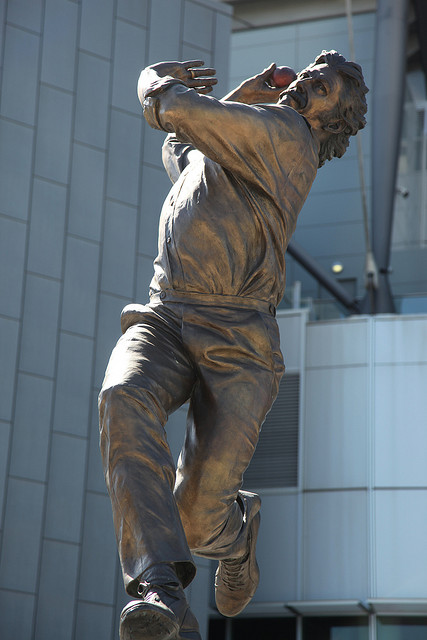
Dennis Lillee has taken the most wickets at the ground, with 82. Statue at the MCG pictured.

Most career wickets
Wickets	Player	Period
82 (26 innings)	(Australia) Dennis Lillee	1972–1983
56 (21 innings)	(Australia) Shane Warne	1992–2006
50 (26 innings)	(Australia) Nathan Lyon	2011–2025
46 (13 innings)	(Australia) Hugh Trumble	1894–1904
45 (14 innings)	(Australia) Graham McKenzie	1962–1968

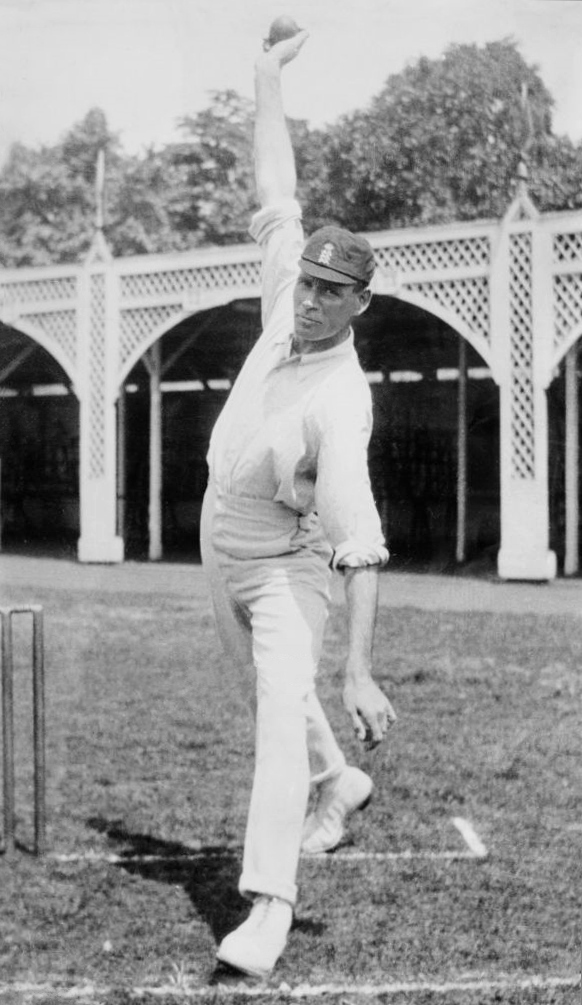
Sydney Barnes took 35 wickets in ten innings; the most of any non-Australian.

Most career wickets (non-Australia)
Wickets	Player	Period
35 (10 innings)	(England) Sydney Barnes	1902–1912
27 (8 innings)	(England) Bobby Peel	1885–1895
24 (6 innings)	(India) Jasprit Bumrah	2018–2024
22 (8 innings)	(England) Billy Bates	1881–1885
22 (8 innings)	(England) Alec Bedser	1947–1951
22 (8 innings)	(Pakistan) Sarfraz Nawaz	1972–1983

Best innings figures
Figures	Player	Date
9/86 v. Australia	(Pakistan) Sarfraz Nawaz	10 Mar 1979
9/121 v. England	(Australia) Arthur Mailey	11 Feb 1921
8/68 v. Australia	(England) Wilfred Rhodes	1 Jan 1904
8/71 v. West Indies	(Australia) Graham McKenzie	26 Dec 1968
8/81 v. Australia	(England) Len Braund	5 Mar 1904
8/143 v. England	(Australia) Max Walker	8 Feb 1975

Best match figures
Figures	Player	Date
15/124 v. Australia	(England) Wilfred Rhodes	1 Jan 1904
14/102 v. Australia	(England) Billy Bates	19 Jan 1883
13/77 v. England	(Australia) Monty Noble	1 Jan 1902
13/110 v. England	(Australia) Fred Spofforth	2 Jan 1879
13/148 v. England	(Australia) Bruce Reid	26 Dec 1990
13/163 v. Australia	(England) Sydney Barnes	1 Jan 1902
13/165 v. Australia	(South Africa) Hugh Tayfield	24 Dec 1952
13/236 v. England	(Australia) Arthur Mailey	11 Feb 1921

Lowest strike rate (4+ innings)
Strike rate	Player	Period
22.6 (6 wickets)	(Australia) John Hodges	1877–1877
29.4 (7 wickets)	(Australia) Cameron Green	2020–2025
30.5 (21 wickets)	(Australia) Scott Boland	2021–2025
31.1 (10 wickets)	(Australia) Laurie Nash	1932–1937
32.6 (35 wickets)	(Australia) Bruce Reid	1985–1991

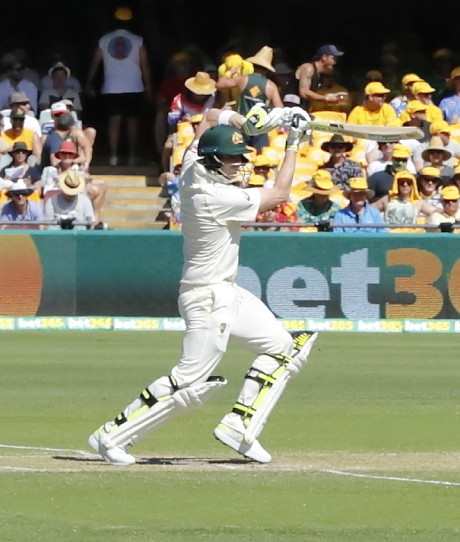
Steve Smith made 165*, as Australia totalled 8/624 declared in 2016.

=== Team records ===
Highest innings scores
Score	Team	Date
8/624d	Australia v. Pakistan	26 Dec 2016
604	Australia v. England	26 Feb 1937
600	Australia v. England	1 Jan 1925
589	England v. Australia	9 Feb 1912
578	Australia v. South Africa	17 Feb 1911

Lowest completed innings
Score	Team	Date
36	South Africa v. Australia	12 Feb 1932
45	South Africa v. Australia	12 Feb 1932
61	England v. Australia	1 Jan 1902
61	England v. Australia	5 Mar 1904
67	India v. Australia	6 Feb 1948

=== Partnership records ===
Highest partnerships
Runs	Wicket	Players	Match	Date
346	6th	Don Bradman (270) & Jack Fingleton (136)	Australia v. England	1 Jan 1937
323	1st	Wilfred Rhodes (179) & Jack Hobbs (178)	England v. Australia	9 Feb 1912
298	2nd	Bill Lawry (205) & Ian Chappell (165)	Australia v. (Cricket West Indies) West Indies	26 Dec 1968
283	1st	Herbert Sutcliffe (176) & Jack Hobbs (154)	England v. Australia	1 Jan 1925
279	6th	Andrew Symonds (156) & Matthew Hayden (153)	Australia v. England	26 Dec 2006

Highest partnerships by wicket
Runs	Wicket	Players	Match	Date
323	1st	Wilfred Rhodes (179) & Jack Hobbs (178)	England v. Australia	9 Feb 1912
298	2nd	Bill Lawry (205) & Ian Chappell (165)	Australia v. (Cricket West Indies) West Indies	26 Dec 1968
249	3rd	Don Bradman (169) & Stan McCabe (112)	Australia v. England	26 Feb 1937
262	4th	Virat Kohli (169) & Ajinkya Rahane (147)	India v. Australia	26 Dec 2014
223*	5th	Don Bradman (127*) & Arthur Morris (100*)	Australia v. India	1 Jan 1948
346	6th	Don Bradman (270) & Jack Fingleton (136)	Australia v. England	1 Jan 1937
185	7th	Graham Yallop (268) & Greg Matthews (75)	Australia v. Pakistan	26 Dec 1983
173	8th	Nip Pellew (116) & Jack Gregory (100)	Australia v. England	31 Dec 1920
180	9th	JP Duminy (166) & Dale Steyn (76)	South Africa v. Australia	26 Dec 2008
120	10th	Reggie Duff (104) & Warwick Armstrong (45*)	Australia v. England	1 Jan 1902

All records correct as of 11 January 2026.

== ODI records ==
- Highest ODI Total: 5/355 – Australia vs. England, 22 November 2022
- Highest Individual ODI Score: 180 (151) – Jason Roy, England vs Australia, 14 January 2018
- Best ODI Innings Bowling Figures: 6/42 – Ajit Agarkar, India vs. Australia, 9 January 2004 and Yuzvendra Chahal, India vs. Australia, 18 January 2019
- Highest ODI Partnership: 269 (for the first wicket) – Travis Head & David Warner, Australia vs. England, 22 November 2022

Last updated 26 May 2025.

== Twenty20 International records ==
- Highest Twenty20 Total: 5/186 – India vs. Zimbabwe, 6 November 2022
- Highest Individual Twenty20 Score: 89 (43) – David Warner, Australia vs. South Africa, 11 January 2009
- Best Twenty20 Innings Bowling Figures: 4/30 – Josh Hazlewood, Australia vs. England, 31 January 2014
- Highest Twenty20 Partnership: 113 (for the fifth wicket) – Virat Kohli & Hardik Pandya, India vs. Pakistan, 23 October 2022

Last updated 26 May 2025.

== VFL/AFL records ==
- Highest Team Score:
  - 32.24 (216) – Hawthorn vs. Essendon, 1 August 1992
  - 31.25 (211) – Richmond vs. St Kilda, 13 April 1985
  - 32.19 (211) – Geelong vs. Richmond, 27 May 1989
  - 32.17 (209) – North Melbourne vs. Richmond, 6 April 1990
  - 31.19 (205) – Hawthorn vs. North Melbourne, 30 April 1988
- Largest Winning Margin:
  - 165 pts – Hawthorn (197) def. Port Adelaide (32), 13 August 2011
  - 162 pts – Hawthorn (193) def. Greater Western Sydney (31), 8 July 2012
  - 160 pts – Hawthorn (216) def. Essendon (56), 1 August 1992
  - 151 pts – Richmond (187) def. Fitzroy (36), 25 August 1996
  - 148 pts – Essendon (184) def. Melbourne (36), 6 April 2013
- Lowest Team Score:
  - 0.8 (8) – Melbourne vs. South Melbourne, 13 July 1912
  - 1.2 (8) – Carlton vs. Melbourne, 8 June 1903
  - 0.9 (9) – Melbourne vs. Essendon, 13 May 1911
  - 0.9 (9) – University vs. Collingwood, 19 August 1911
  - 1.6 (12) – Richmond vs. Melbourne, 27 June 1908
- Most Goals in a Game:
  - 14 – Gary Ablett Sr., Geelong vs. Essendon, 1 May 1993
  - 14 – Gary Ablett Sr., Geelong vs. Richmond, 27 May 1989
  - 14 – John Longmire, North Melbourne vs. Melbourne, 7 July 1990
  - 13 – Matthew Lloyd, Essendon vs. Sydney, 10 April 1999
  - 12 – Jason Dunstall, Hawthorn vs. Richmond, 15 August 1992
- Most Disposals in a Game:
  - 54 – Tom Mitchell, Hawthorn vs. Collingwood, 24 March 2018
  - 53 – Gary Ablett, Jr., Gold Coast vs. Collingwood, 3 June 2012
  - 51 – Lachie Neale, Brisbane Lions vs. Richmond, 25 August 2019
  - 50 – Tom Mitchell, Hawthorn vs. Collingwood, 20 May 2017
  - 49 – Dane Swan, Collingwood vs. Hawthorn, 21 July 2012
- Most Games Played:
  - 243 – Scott Pendlebury (Collingwood)
  - 200 – Kevin Bartlett (Richmond)
  - 199 – Steele Sidebottom (Collingwood)
  - 186 – Dustin Fletcher (Essendon)
  - 176 – Shane Edwards (Richmond)
- Most Goals Kicked:
  - 464 – Matthew Richardson (Richmond)
  - 461 – Matthew Lloyd (Essendon)
  - 408 – Jack Riewoldt (Richmond)
  - 386 – David Neitz (Melbourne)
  - 380 – Wayne Carey (Adelaide, North Melbourne)

All records correct as of 16 April 2024.

== Statues ==
=== Founding statue ===
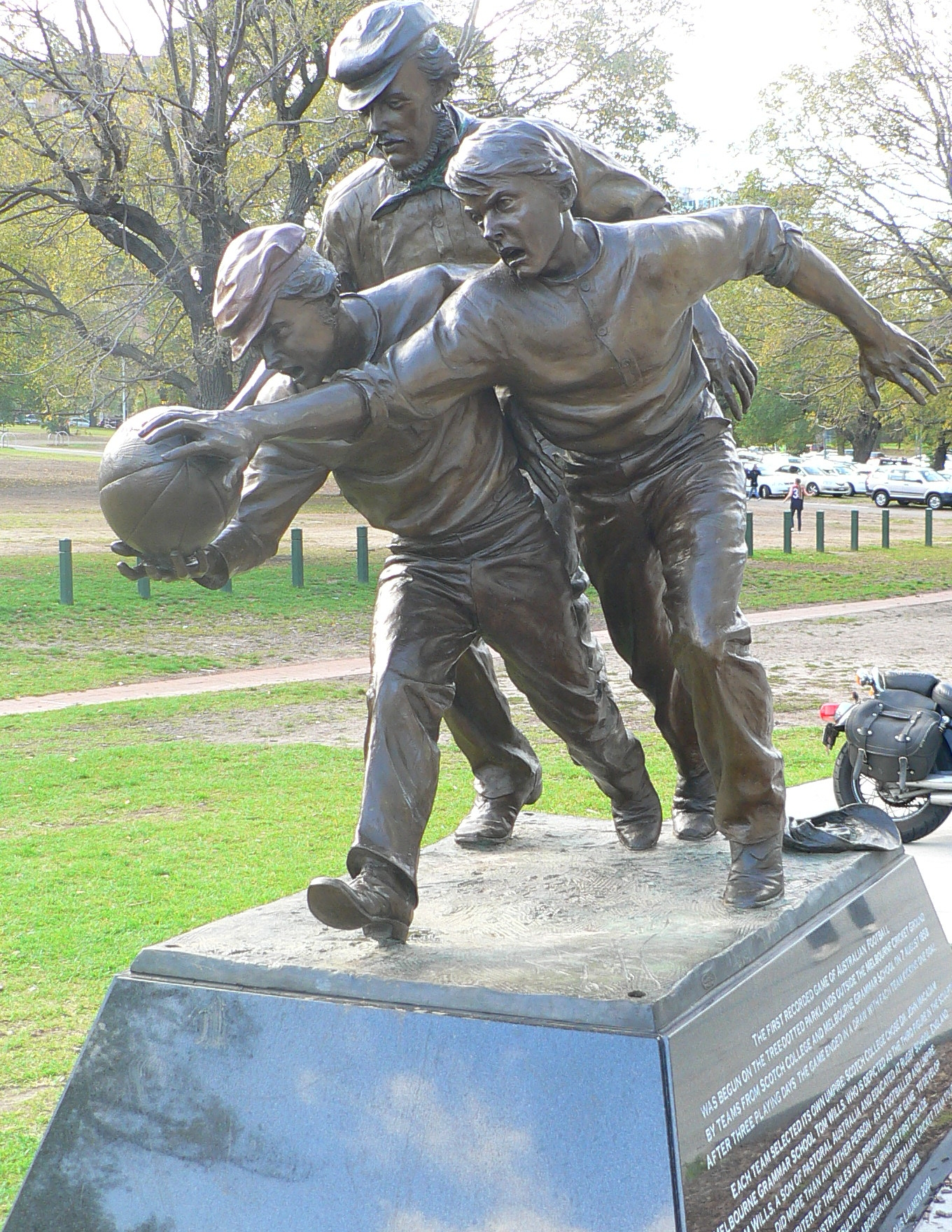
Statue of cricketer and Australian rules football pioneer Tom Wills umpiring an 1858 football match

Statue	Sport	Unveiled	Location	Link
Tom Wills; Commemorative sculpture for the first game of Australian rules football	Cricket and Australian rules football	2001	Outside MCG (between Gates 2 and 3)	Non-MCG

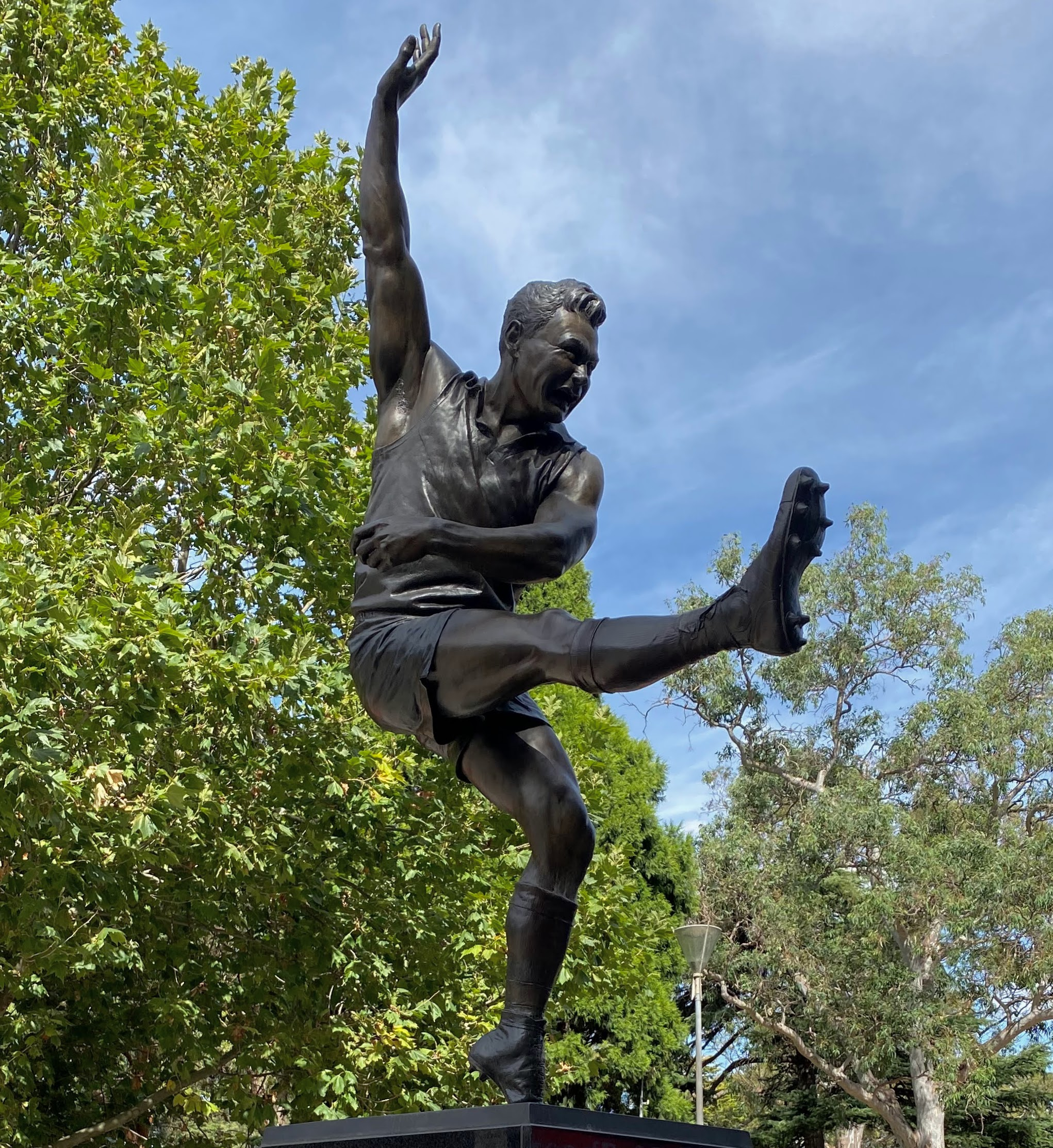
Ron Barassi

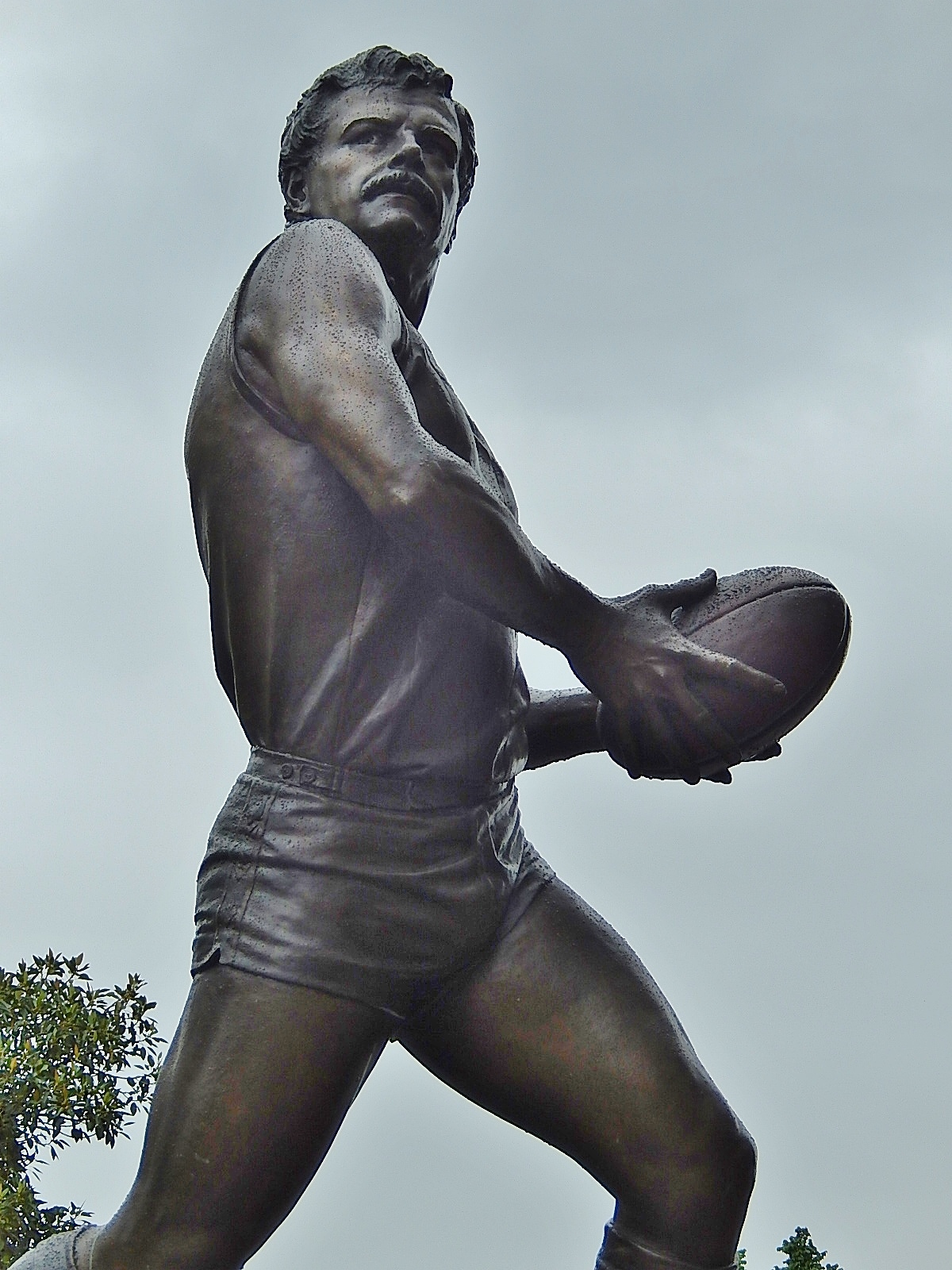
Leigh Matthews

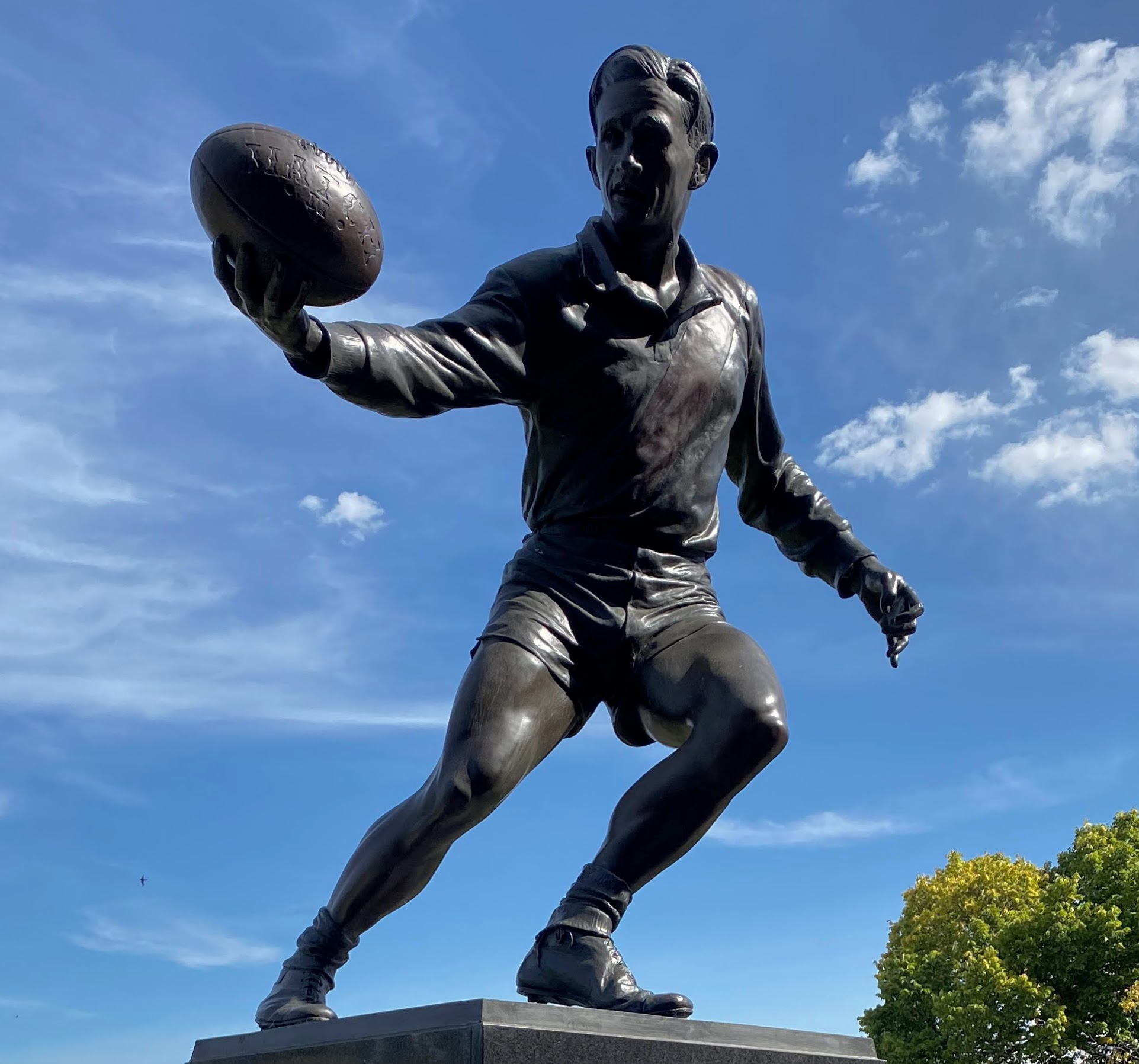
Dick Reynolds

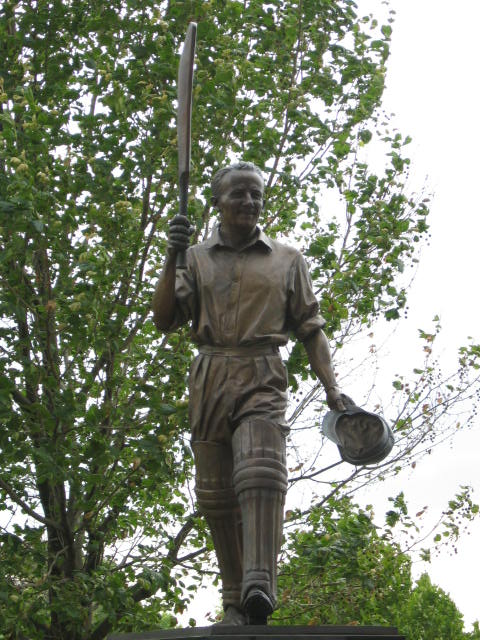
Don Bradman

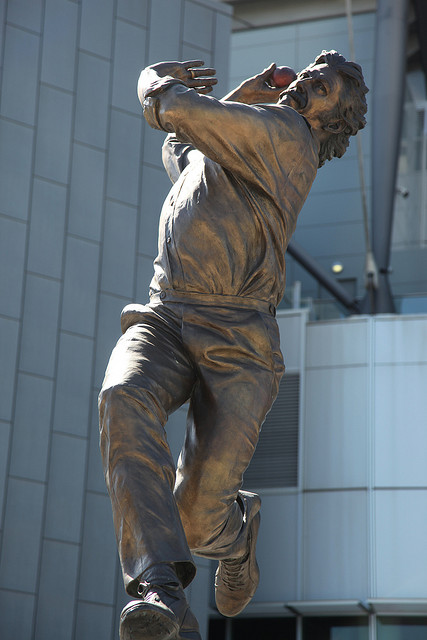
Dennis Lillee

=== Tattersall's Parade of Champions ===
The Tattersall's Parade of the Champions undertaking is a gift to the people of Australia by Tattersall's and is a focal point of the Yarra Park precinct.

The MCG is a magnet for tourists worldwide and the statues reinforce the association between the elite sportsmen and women who have competed here and the stadium that rejoiced in their performances.

Statue	Sport	Unveiled	Location	Link
Sir Donald Bradman	Cricket	2003, May	Outside gate 5	MCG
Betty Cuthbert	Track and field	2003, August	Outside gate 3	MCG
Ron Barassi	Australian rules football	2003, September	Outside gate 4	MCG
Keith Miller	Cricket	2004, February	Outside gate 5	MCG
Dick Reynolds	Australian rules football	2004, June	Outside gate 6	MCG
Shirley Strickland	Track and field	2004, November	Outside gate 3	MCG
Haydn Bunton, Sr.	Australian rules football	2005, April	Outside gate 6	MCG
Leigh Matthews	Australian rules football	2005, August	Outside gate 4	MCG
Bill Ponsford	Cricket	2005, December	Outside gate 1	MCG
Dennis Lillee	Cricket	2006, December	Outside gate 1	MCG

=== Australia Post Avenue of Legends ===
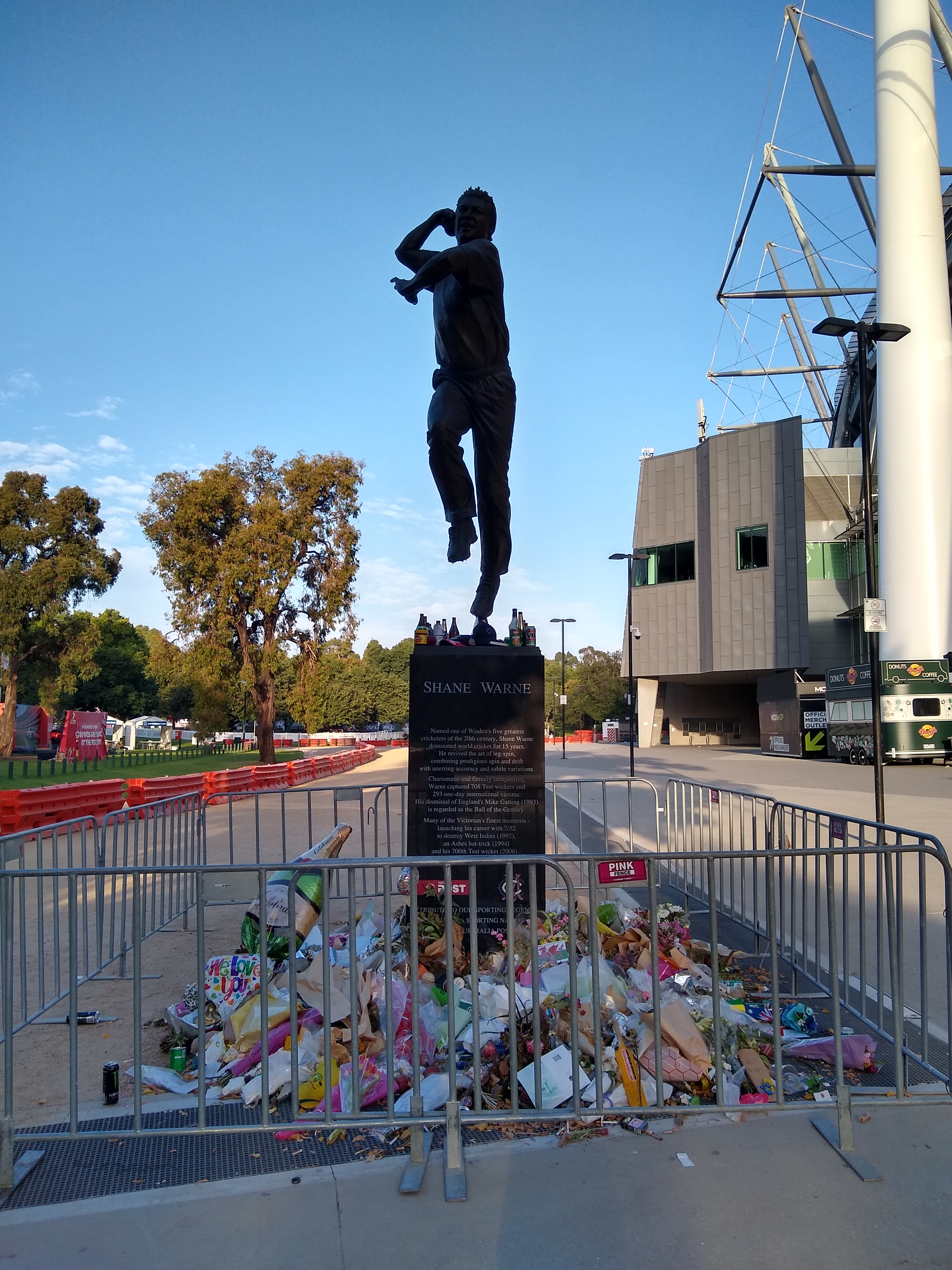
The statue of Shane Warne in 2022. The statue became a makeshift memorial to Warne shortly after his death

In 2010, the Melbourne Cricket Club (MCC) announced an expansion to the list of sporting statues placed around the MCG precinct in partnership with Australia Post.

The Australia Post Avenue of Legends project aimed to place a minimum of five statues in Yarra Park, extending from the gate 2 MCC members entrance up the avenue towards Wellington Parade. The most recent addition of Kevin Bartlett was unveiled in March 2017.

Statue	Sport	Unveiled	Location	Link
Shane Warne	Cricket	2011, December	Outside gate 2	MCG
Norm Smith	Australian rules football	2012, September	Near Jolimont Station	MCG
John Coleman	Australian rules football	2013, September	Outside gate 2	MCG
Neil Harvey	Cricket	2014, January	Near Jolimont Station	MCG
Jim Stynes	Australian rules football	2014, September	Outside gate 2	MCG
Kevin Bartlett	Australian rules football	2017, March	Near Jolimont Station	MCG

== See also ==
- Cricket in Victoria
- Australian landmarks
- History of Test cricket (to 1883)
- History of Test cricket (1884 to 1889)
- History of Test cricket (1890 to 1900)
- List of Test cricket grounds
- National Sports Museum, a museum dedicated to Australian sport, located within the Melbourne Cricket Ground
- List of Australian rules football statues, a list of Australian rules football-related statues across Australia
- List of national stadiums
- Lists of stadiums

Events and tenants
Preceded by Helsingin olympiastadion Helsinki	Summer Olympics; Main Venue (Melbourne Cricket Ground); 1956	Succeeded by Stadio Olimpico; Rome
Preceded by Helsingin olympiastadion Helsinki	Olympic Athletics competitions Main Venue; 1956	Succeeded by Stadio Olimpico; Rome
Preceded by Helsingin olympiastadion Helsinki	Summer Olympics; Football Men's Finals (Melbourne Cricket Ground); 1956	Succeeded by Stadio Flaminio; Rome
Preceded by Eden Gardens	Cricket World Cup; Final Venue; 1992	Succeeded by Gaddafi Stadium
Preceded by Wankhede Stadium	Cricket World Cup; Final Venue; 2015	Succeeded by Lord's
