= List of people from Charlotte, North Carolina =

This is a list of people who were born in, lived in, or are closely associated with the city of Charlotte, North Carolina.

== Academia ==
- Graham Tillett Allison Jr., political scientist and professor at the John F. Kennedy School of Government at Harvard University
- Katharine Cramer Angell, one of two named founders of The Culinary Institute of America
- James W. Crawford III, president, Texas Southern University
- Sonya Curry, educator
- Christopher Ellison, sociologist specializing in the sociology of religion
- Chris Folk, served in the office of School Community Relations for the Charlotte Mecklenburg County Schools during desegregation
- Martha Louise Morrow Foxx, pioneering educator for the blind
- Edith Henderson, landscape architect
- John Kuykendall, served as 15th president of Davidson College
- Paul Marion, university administrator and academic
- George C. Williams, evolutionary biologist
- Anne D. Yoder, biologist, researcher, and professor

== Art and literature ==
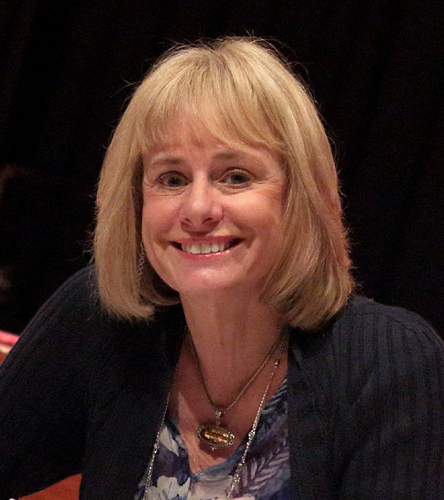
Kathy Reichs

- Romare Bearden (1911–1988), artist and writer
- Brian Blanchfield, poet and essayist
- Jason V. Brock, filmmaker, musician, artist, and author
- Don Brown, author and attorney
- W. J. Cash, writer and journalist
- Silas Farley, ballet dancer, choreographer and educator
- Ian Flynn, comic book writer
- Brent Funderburk, artist
- Jeffrey Gitomer, business book author
- Harry Golden, author
- Hank Hanegraaff, author, radio talk-show host, former advocate of evangelical Christianity (until 2017 with his conversion to Eastern Orthodox faith)
- Laraine Herring, author
- Cheris F. Hodges, author
- Travis Jeppesen, author
- Ben Long, artist, most known for his fresco work and drawings
- Carson McCullers, author
- Jenny Offill, novelist
- Diane Oliver (1943–1966), Black feminist writer
- Kathy Reichs, anthropologist and author
- Stephanie S. Tolan, children's book author
- Mel Tomlinson, ballet and modern dancer
- Justin Tornow, dancer and choreographer
- Mary Oates Spratt Van Landingham, writer, historian, and clubwoman

== Business ==
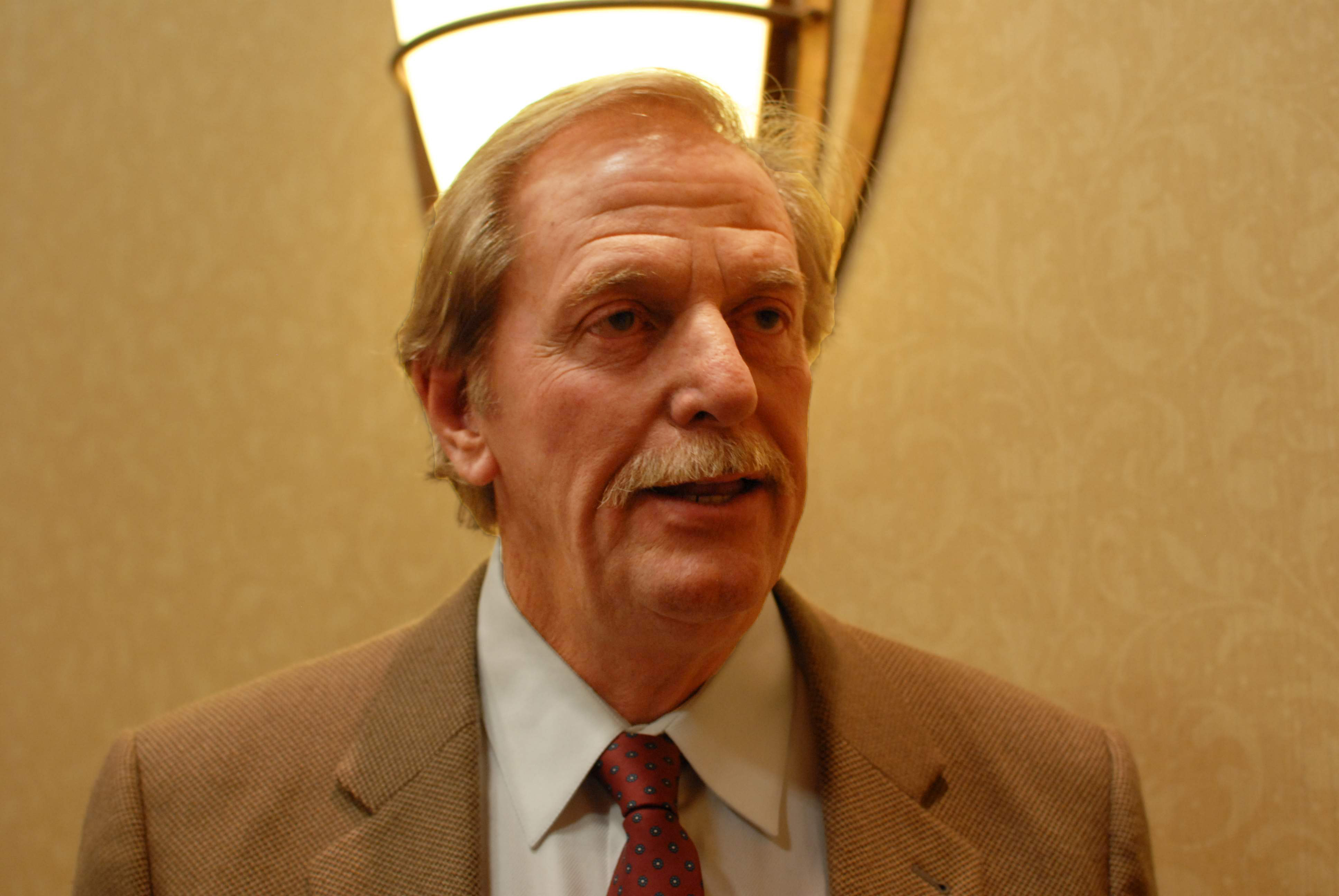
Robert Yates

- Cy Bahakel, former North Carolina state senator and media magnate, instrumental in bringing the Charlotte Hornets franchise to Charlotte
- Irwin Belk, businessman and politician, executive with Belk department stores
- Jim Crockett Jr., former professional wrestling promoter
- Richard Darman, businessman and government official who served in senior positions during the presidencies of Ronald Reagan and George H. W. Bush
- Elisabeth DeMarse, businesswoman, former chairman and CEO of TheStreet
- James Buchanan Duke, industrialist, founder of The Duke Endowment and Duke University
- Jay Faison, entrepreneur and a conservative philanthropist, founder of the ClearPath Foundation
- Jack Fulk (1932–2011), founder of fast-food chain Bojangles' Famous Chicken 'n Biscuits
- Earl Patterson Hall, real estate developer and businessman who founded Carowinds
- Robert L. Johnson, co-founder of BET, former majority owner of then Charlotte Bobcats, first black American billionaire
- Michael Jordan, former professional Hall of Fame basketball player, principal owner and chairman of the Charlotte Hornets
- Herman Lay, involved in potato chip manufacturing with his eponymous brand of Lay's potato chips
- Leon Levine, founder of Family Dollar; billionaire, businessman and philanthropist
- Michael Marsicano, president and CEO of the Foundation for the Carolinas, one of the largest philanthropic community foundations in the country in terms of assets
- Hugh McColl, former chairman and CEO of Bank of America
- Bruton Smith, billionaire; founder and CEO of Speedway Motorsports, Inc. and founder of Sonic Automotive
- Clemmie Spangler, businessman, former president of the 16-campus University of North Carolina system, 1986–1997; was No. 117 on Forbes' list of 400 richest Americans
- David S. Taylor, business executive; chairman, president, and CEO of Procter & Gamble
- Robert Yates, former owner of NASCAR Cup Series team Yates Racing

== Entertainment ==
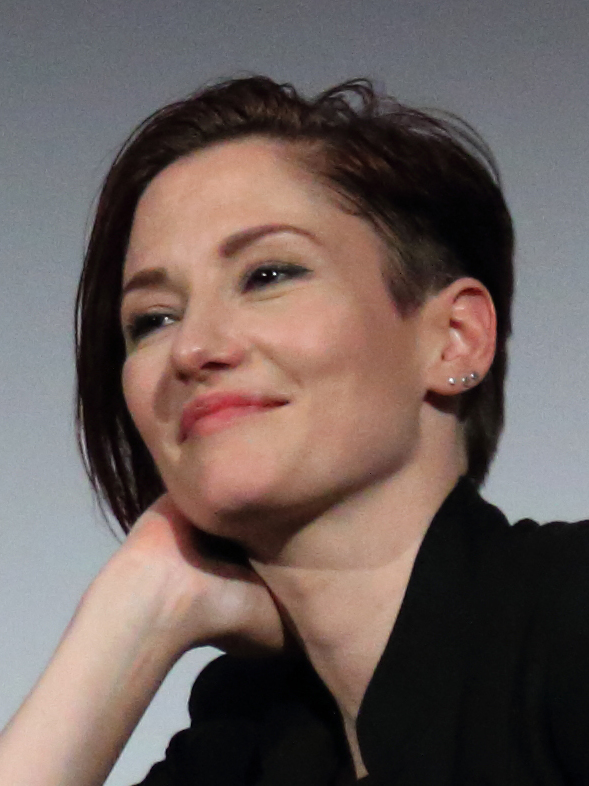
Chyler Leigh

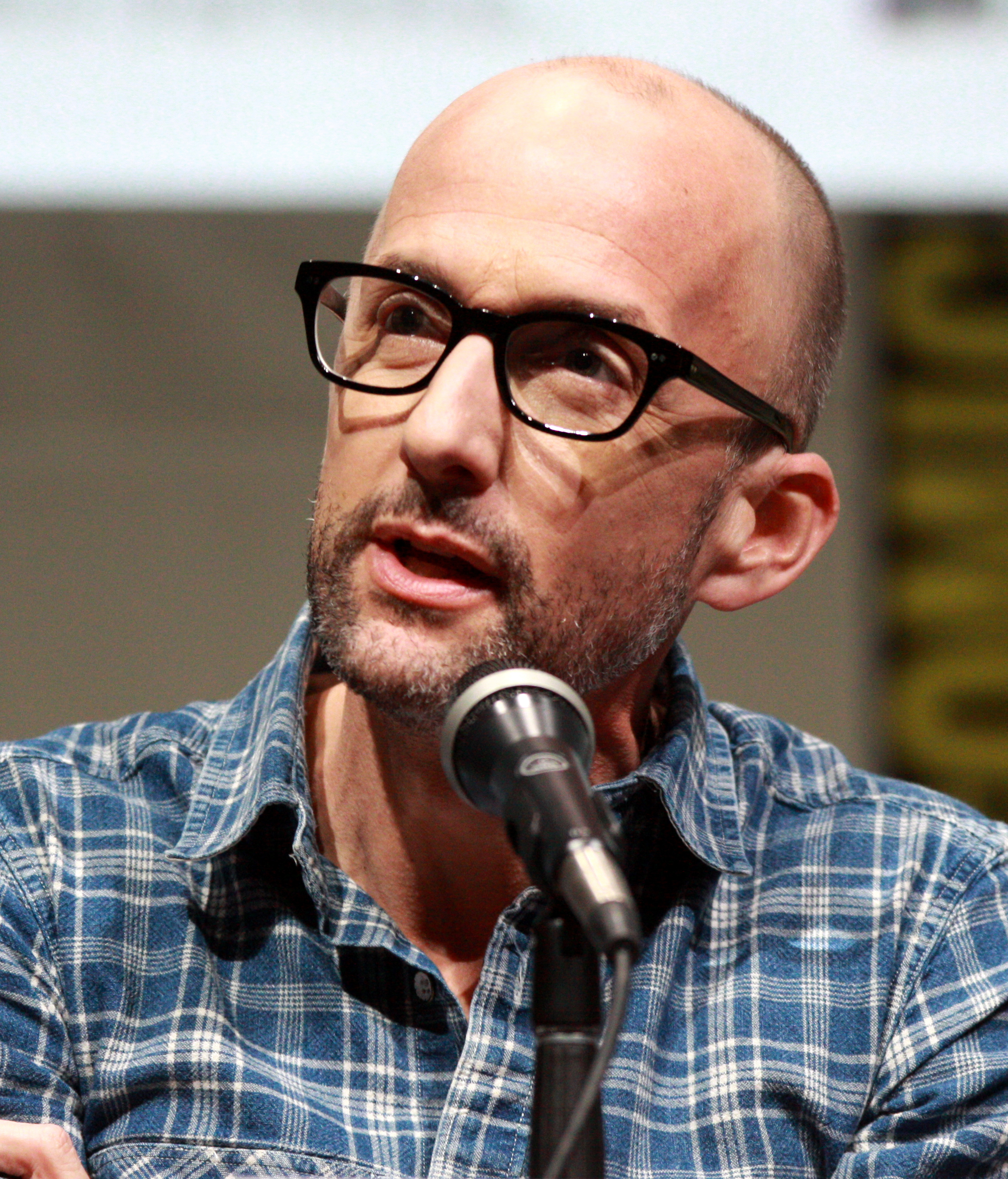
Jim Rash

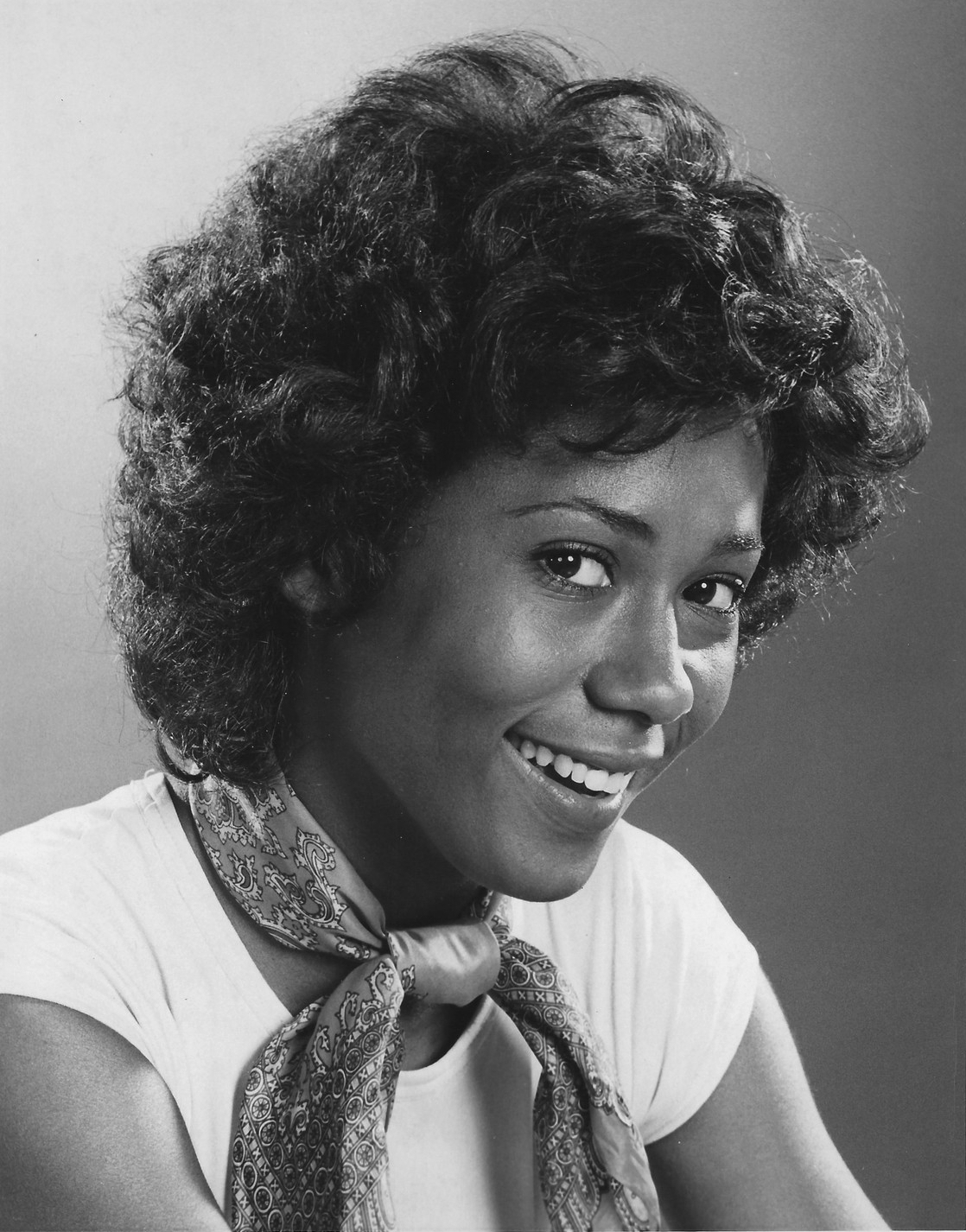
Berlinda Tolbert

- Tyler Barnhardt, actor, best known for Underground, 13 Reasons Why
- Melendy Britt, actress
- Ben Browder, actor, Farscape and Stargate SG-1
- Nick Cannon, television host, rapper, actor, comedian, attended Quail Hollow Middle School
- Ayesha Curry, actress, celebrity cook, author
- Mark Freiburger, filmmaker
- Rohit Gupta, film director, producer
- Ali Hillis, actress
- Lauren Holt, actress, comedian, singer, and cast member of Saturday Night Live
- Brian Huskey, actor, comedian, and writer
- Billy James, musician, producer, and writer
- Dwayne 'The Rock' Johnson, actor, former professional wrestler, attended Montclaire Elementary School
- Sharon Lawrence, actress, known for NYPD Blue
- Chyler Leigh, actress
- Ross McElwee, documentary filmmaker; professor at Harvard University
- Kenice Mobley, comedian
- Eva Noblezada, actress, singer
- QCP, chef, author
- Jim Rash, actor in NBC/Yahoo's Community
- Britt Robertson, actress
- Gloria Saunders, actress
- Randolph Scott, actor, 1940s and '50s film star
- Jessica Stroup, actress, best known for portraying Erin Silver on 90210
- Berlinda Tolbert, actress on CBS sitcom The Jeffersons
- Skeet Ulrich, actor, Jericho; graduate of Northwest Cabarrus High School
- Earl Wentz, actor, pianist, composer, and musical director, known for his creation of the American Composer Series in 2000
- Maurice Williams, songwriter and performer of Maurice Williams and the Zodiacs, famous for "Stay"

== Government and law ==
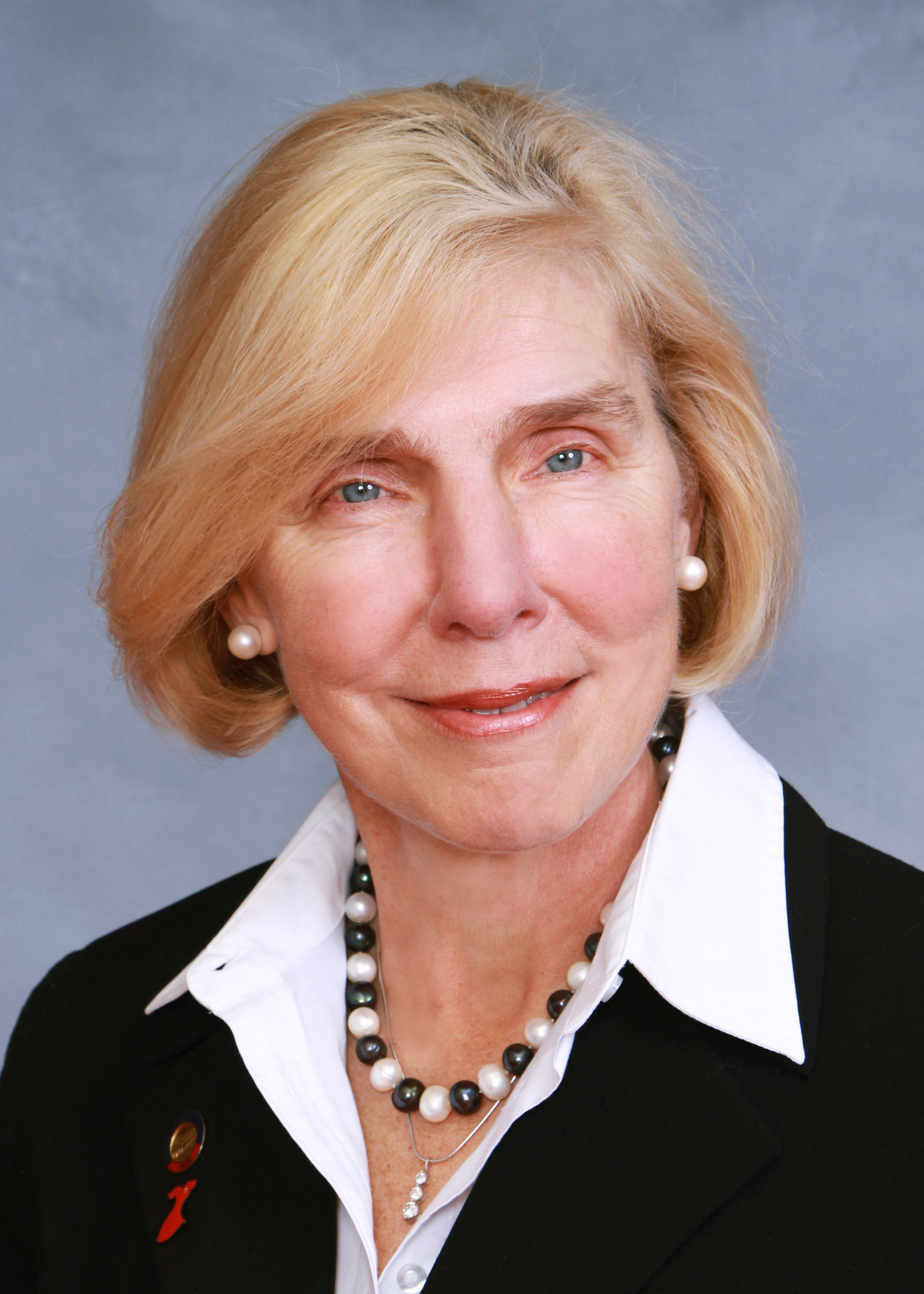
Becky Carney

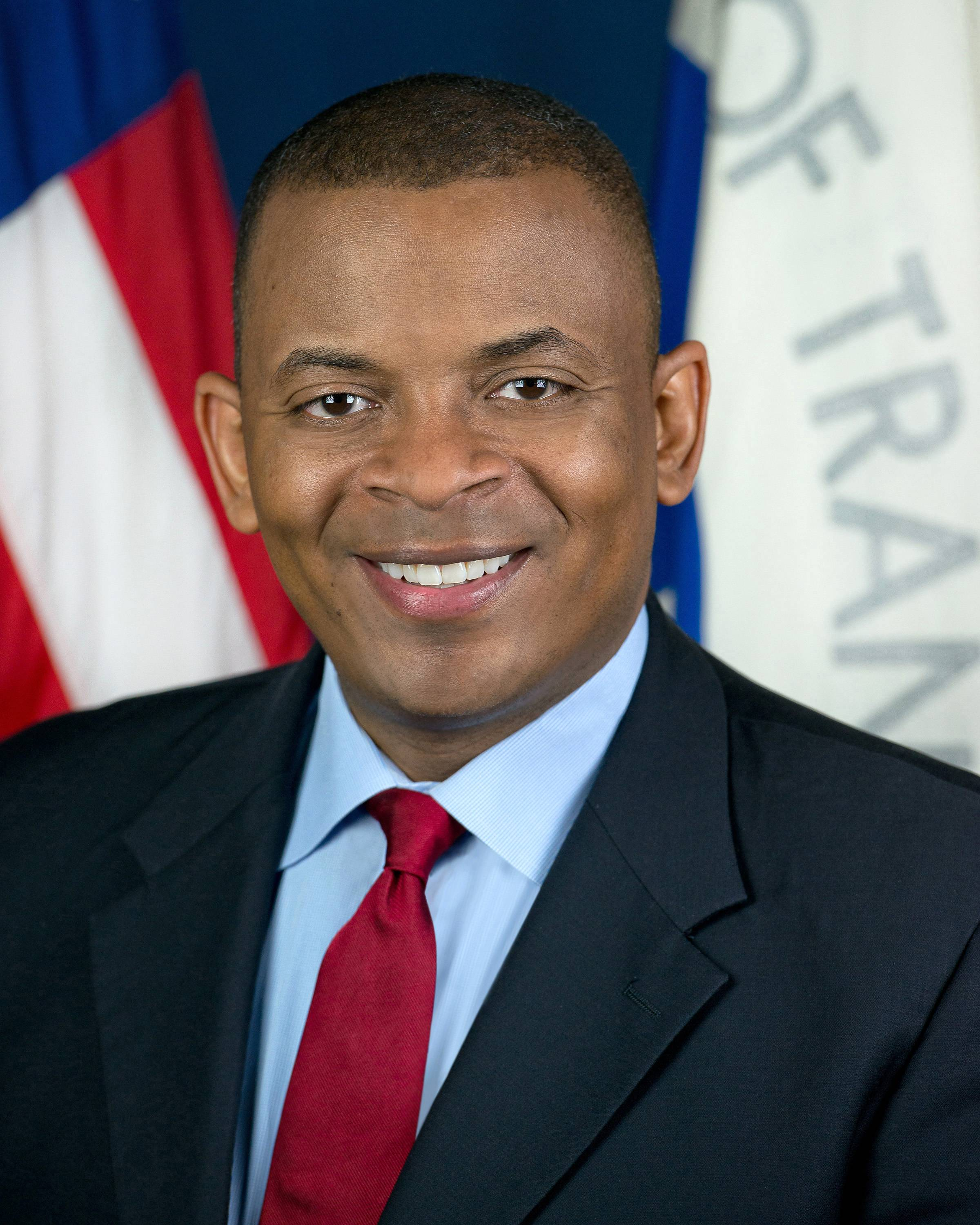
Anthony Foxx

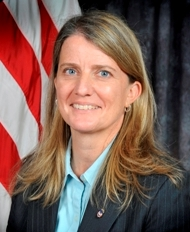
Anne Tompkins

- Alma Adams, member of the United States House of Representatives, 2015-present; member of the North Carolina House of Representatives, 1994–2014
- Armistead Burwell, associate justice of the North Carolina Supreme Court, 1892–1894
- Rebecca Carney, Democratic member of the North Carolina General Assembly
- Daniel G. Clodfelter, attorney and politician, Democratic mayor of Charlotte, North Carolina
- Charlie Smith Dannelly, educator and politician, Democratic member of the North Carolina General Assembly
- Walter E. Dellinger III, professor and solicitor
- Ben Elbert Douglas, Sr., mayor of Charlotte, North Carolina 1935–1941
- Anthony Foxx, 17th United States Secretary of Transportation, and mayor of Charlotte (2009–2013)
- Jim Gulley, member of the North Carolina General Assembly
- Richard Hudson, United States representative for North Carolina's 8th congressional district
- Jeff Jackson, 52nd attorney general of North Carolina; former United States representative for North Carolina's 14th congressional district and North Carolina state senator for the 37th district
- Cheslie Kryst, lawyer; Miss North Carolina USA 2019 and Miss USA 2019
- Pat McCrory, 74th governor of North Carolina; longest-serving mayor in Charlotte's history (1995–2009)
- James McDuffie, North Carolina state senator
- James B. McMillan, federal judge who ruled in favor of school busing to integrate Charlotte-Mecklenburg schools
- Cameron A. Morrison, governor of North Carolina
- Sara Virginia Ecker Watts Morrison, First Lady of North Carolina
- Angelia Lawrance Morrison Harris, First Lady of North Carolina
- Mick Mulvaney, former United States Special Envoy for Northern Ireland and White House Chief of Staff in the first Trump administration, attended Charlotte Catholic High School
- Sue Myrick, member of the United States House of Representatives; mayor of Charlotte (1987–1991)
- Sarah Parker, chief justice of the North Carolina Supreme Court (born in Charlotte)
- Robert Pittenger, real estate investor; Republican former state senator in the North Carolina General Assembly (2002–2008)
- Jennifer Roberts, politician, community activist, and 58th mayor of Charlotte
- Toussaint Romain, attorney, public defender, and civil rights figure
- Ruth Samuelson, member of the North Carolina General Assembly representing the state's 104th House district
- John Spratt, United States representative for South Carolina's 5th congressional district
- Mike Sprayberry, North Carolina director of Emergency Management
- Randy Staten, Minnesota state representative and football player
- Anne Tompkins, served as the United States attorney for the United States District Court for the Western District of North Carolina
- Richard Vinroot, attorney and mayor of Charlotte (1991–1995)
- RaShon Young, member of the Florida House of Representatives

== Journalism and media ==
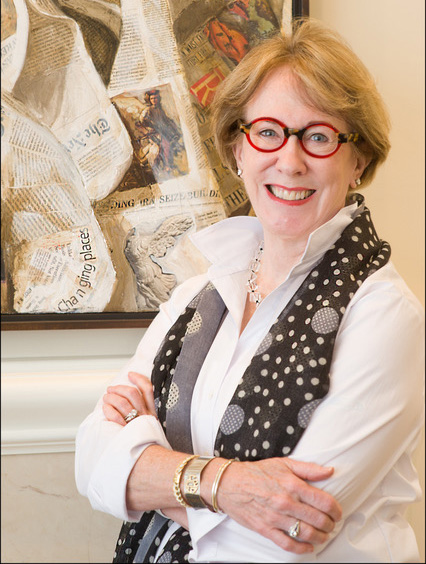
Sandra Mims Rowe

- John Bain (1984–2018), British game commentator
- Heather Childers, television news anchor
- Leigh Diffey, auto racing commentator
- William Emerson (1923–2009), journalist; covered the civil rights era as Newsweek's first bureau chief assigned to cover the Southern United States; later editor in chief of The Saturday Evening Post
- Sandy Grady (1928–2015), sports journalist
- Mark Kemp, music journalist and author
- Anna Kooiman, news anchor and television panelist
- Jim Nantz, CBS television sportscaster
- Maureen O'Boyle, formerly of Current Affair and Extra; now newscaster for WBTV
- Brad Panovich (born 1972), chief meteorologist for WCNC-TV
- Joe Posnanski, sports journalist
- Bill Rosinski, sportscaster and talk show host
- Sandra Mims Rowe, newspaper journalist
- Reed Sarratt, journalist
- Beatrice Thompson, broadcast television and radio personality

== Military and aviation ==
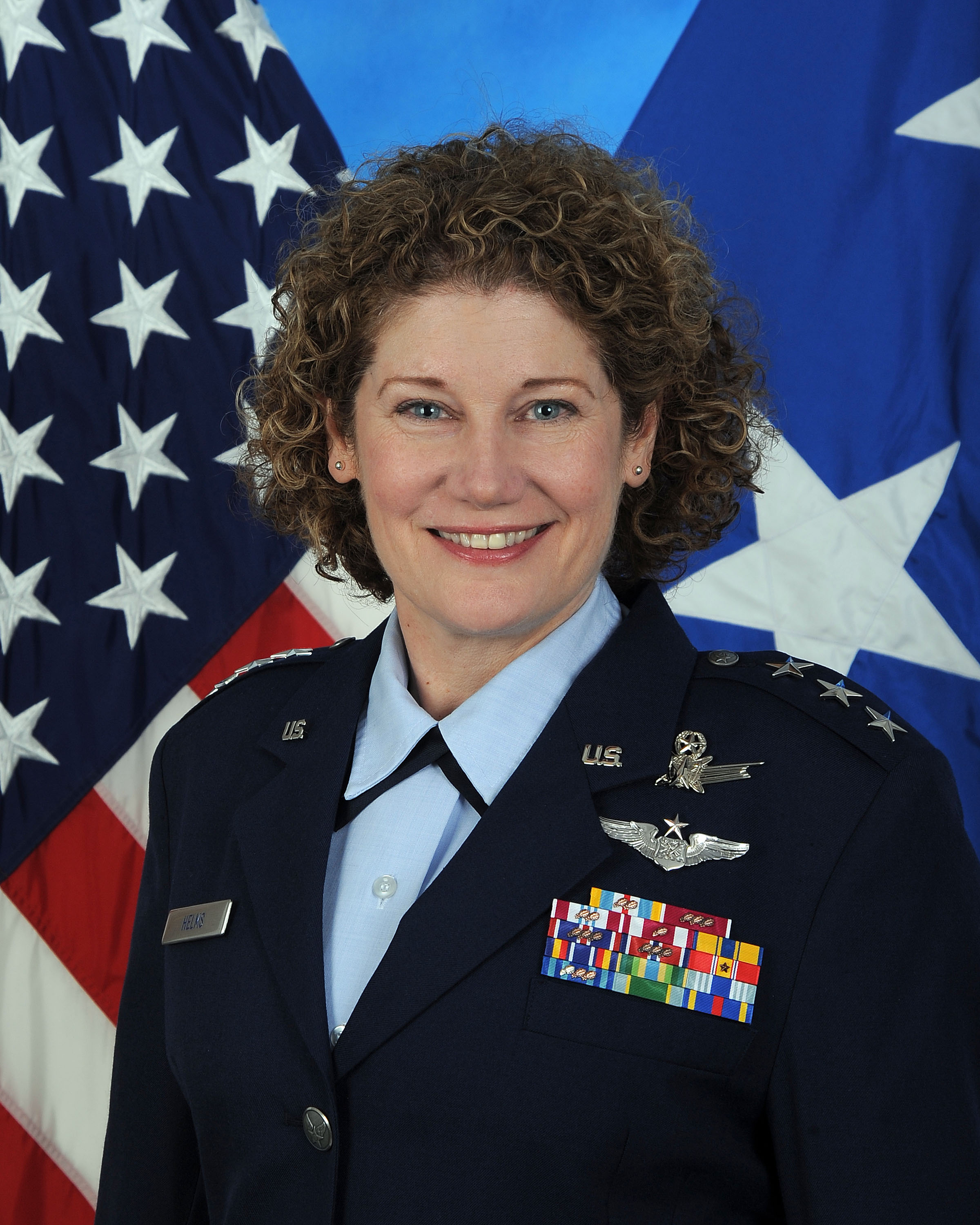
Susan Helms

- Jerry K. Crump, soldier in the United States Army; received the Medal of Honor for his actions during the Korean War
- Richard T. Devereaux, retired United States Air Force Major General
- Charles Duke, NASA astronaut, United States Air Force officer and test pilot, 10th person to walk on the Moon
- Jack B. Farris, United States Army lieutenant general
- John Gibbon, officer in the Union Army during the American Civil War, also served in the American Indian Wars
- Buster Glosson, former deputy chief of staff for plans and operations at the headquarters for the U.S. Air Force in Washington D.C.
- Susan Helms, brigadier general-select in the U.S. Air Force and former NASA astronaut
- Hunter Marshall III, United States Navy officer during World War II

== Musicians ==
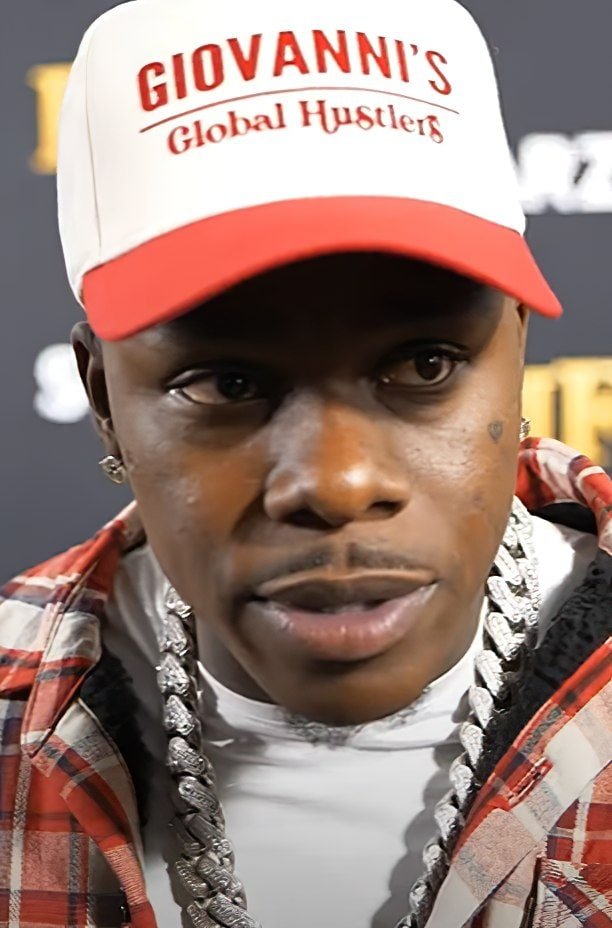
DaBaby

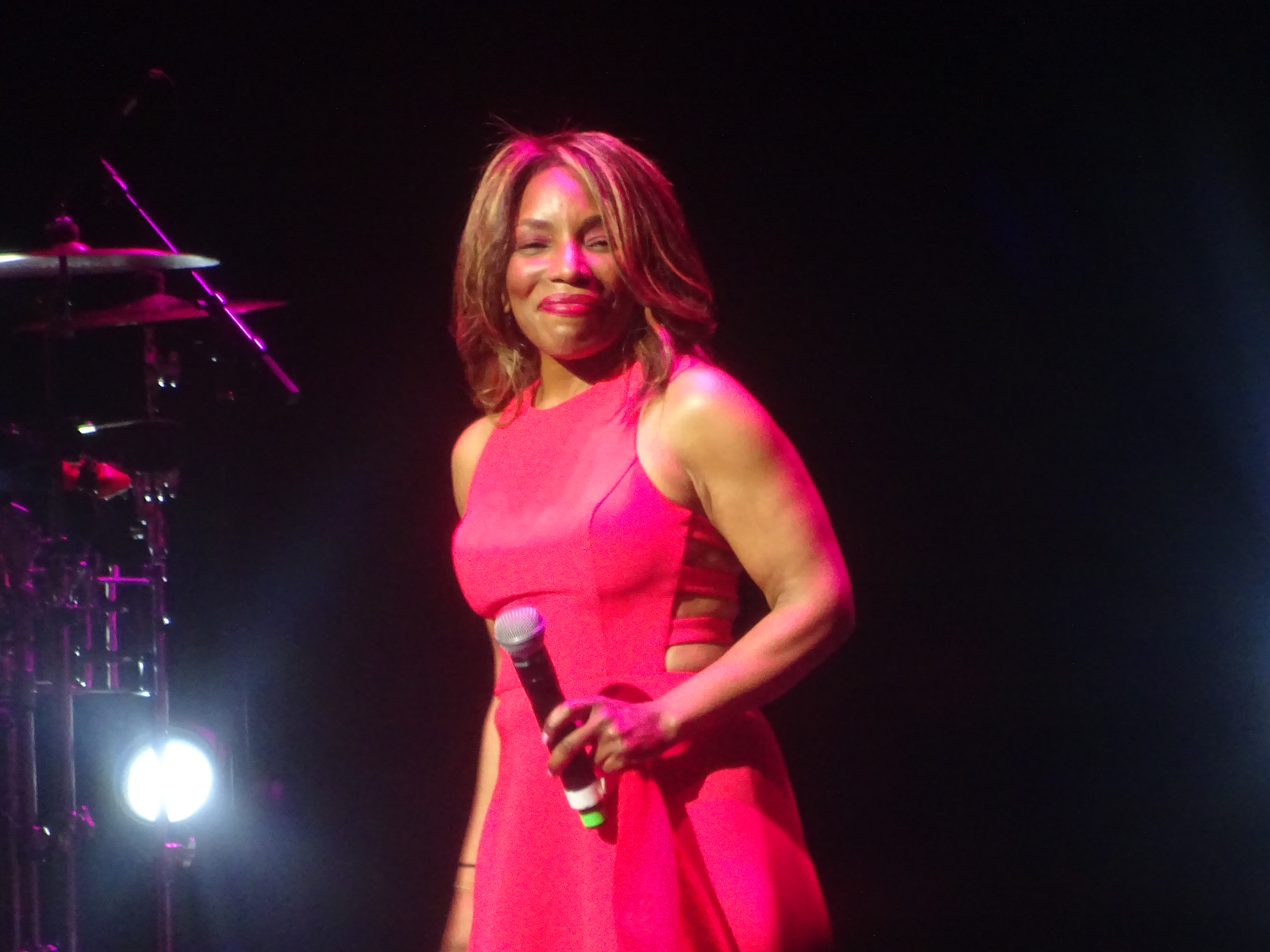
Stephanie Mills

- Ant-Bee, musician
- Seth Avett, singer and one of the founding members of American folk-rock band The Avett Brothers
- Horace Brown, R&B singer
- Nappy Brown (1929–2008), R&B and gospel singer
- Phillip Bush, classical pianist
- Tom Constanten, former keyboard player, Grateful Dead
- DaBaby, rapper, songwriter
- Deniro Farrar, rapper
- FireHouse, early 1990s "hair metal band"
- Flagship, alt-rock band
- Anthony Hamilton, R&B singer
- Wilbert Harrison, R&B singer
- Joe Henry, musician
- Hopesfall, hard rock band
- Tyrone Jefferson, trombonist
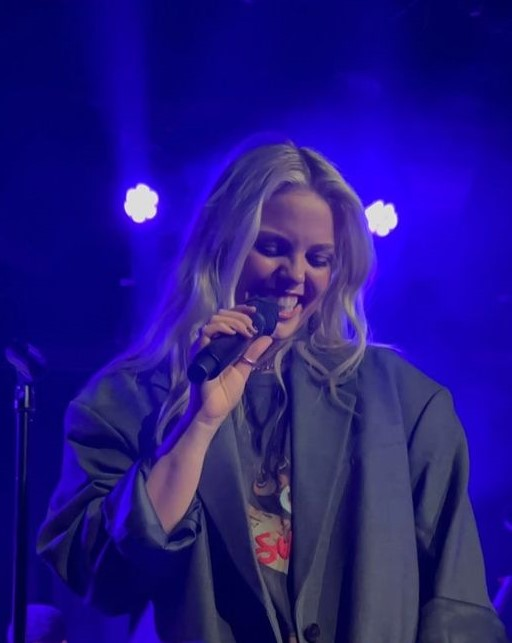
  Reneé Rapp
- K-Ci & JoJo (Cedric "K-Ci" Hailey & Joel "JoJo" Hailey) of 1990s R&B group JodeciSi Kahn, singer-songwriter and activist (resident of Charlotte)
- John P. Kee, gospel singer
- Adam Lazzara, lead singer of Taking Back Sunday
- Jon Lindsay, solo recording artist; former member of Benji Hughes and many other bands; record producer; political activist
- Kelsey Lu, singer and cellist
- Lute, rapper
- Mavi, musician
- John Mark McMillan, singer-songwriter
- Tammy Faye Messner (1942–2007), Christian singer and television personality; former wife of televangelist, and later convicted felon, Jim Bakker
- Stephanie Mills, R&B singer
- Renee Rapp, singer-songwriter
- David Vincent, frontman, bassist, and singer of the death metal band Morbid Angel
- Wednesday 13, musician
- Willie Weeks, bass guitarist, known for work with Donny Hathaway, Stevie Wonder and George Harrison

== Sportspeople ==
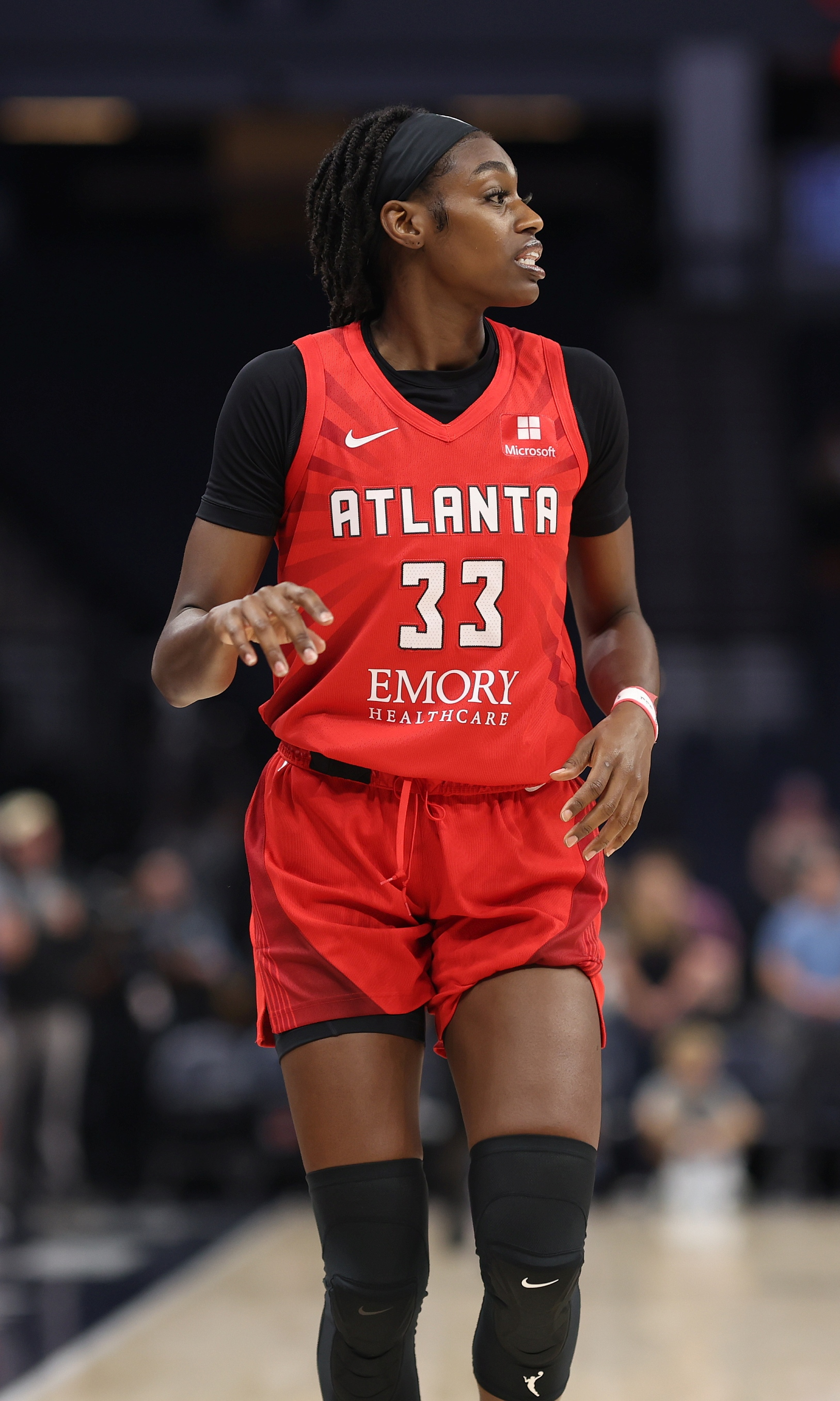
Maya Caldwell

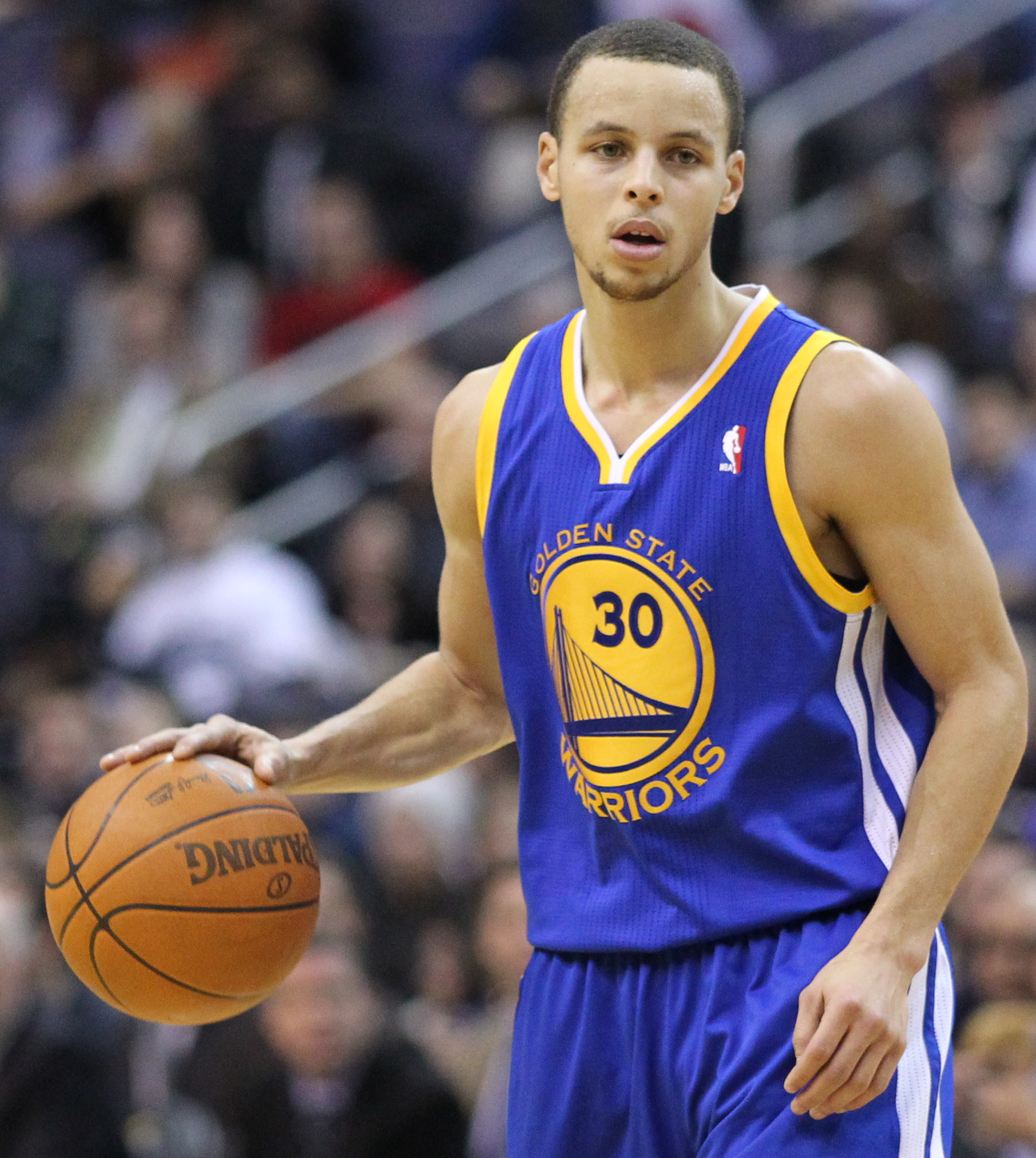
Steph Curry

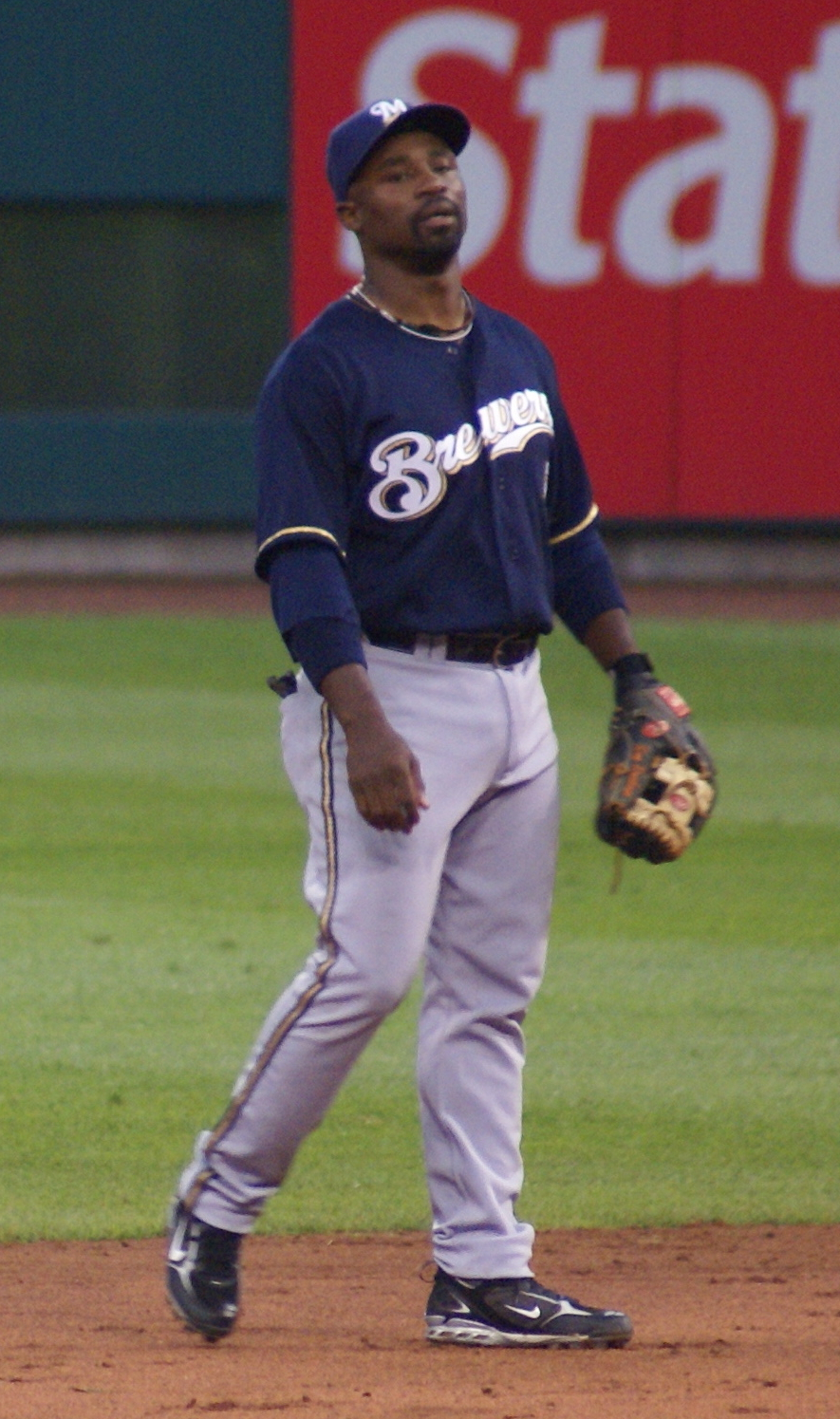
Ray Durham

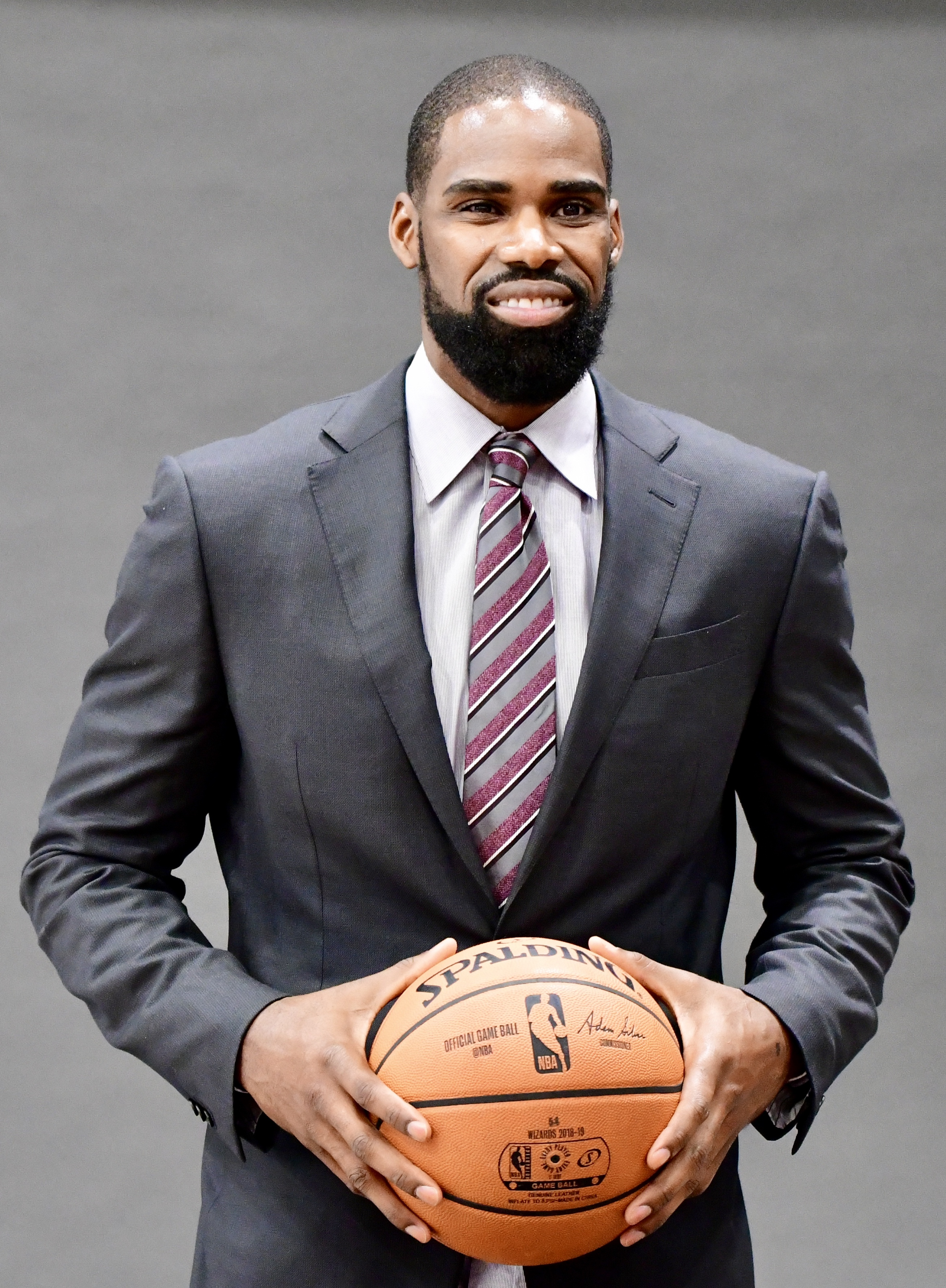
Antawn Jamison

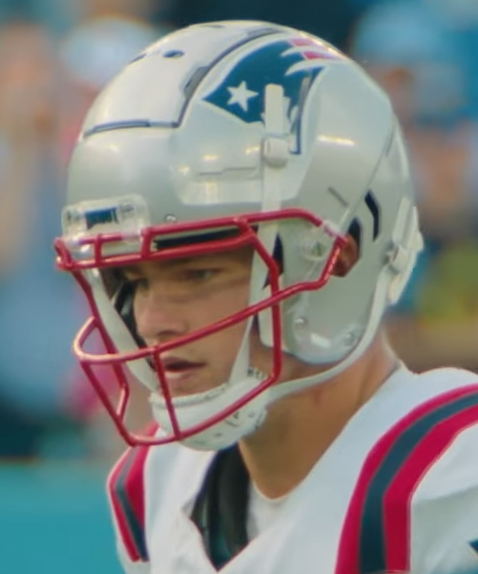
Drake Maye

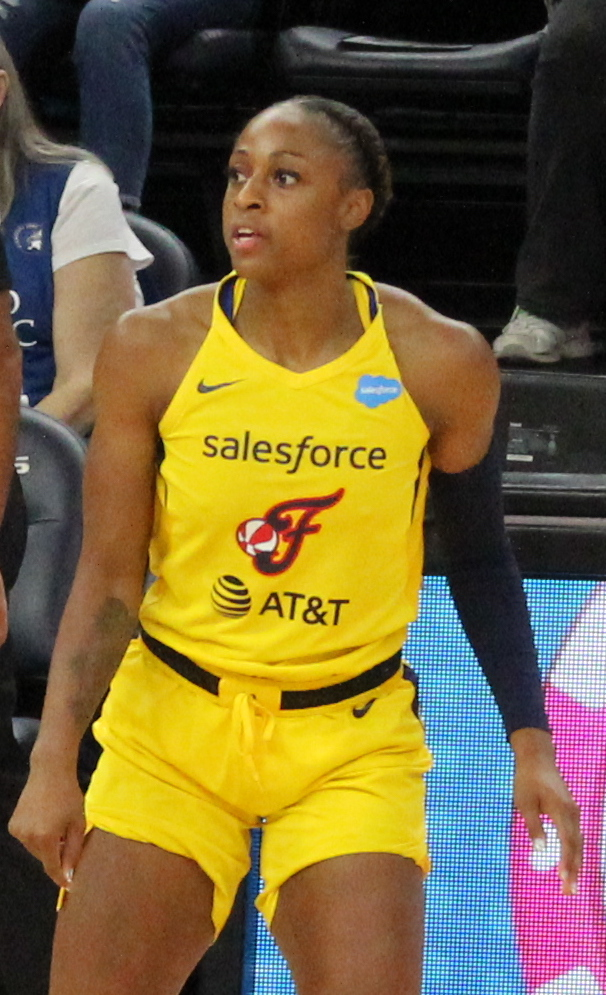
Tiffany Mitchell

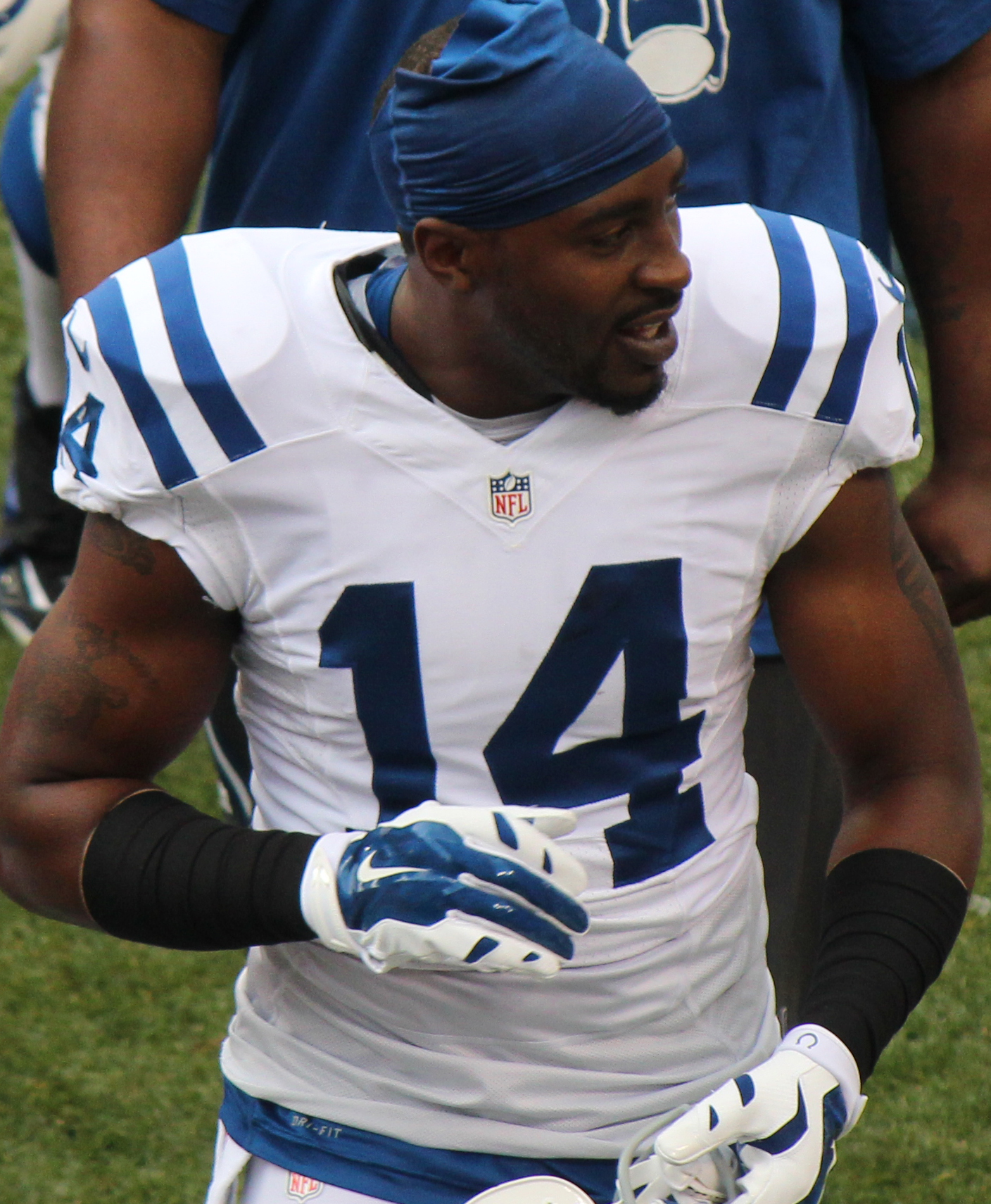
Hakeem Nicks

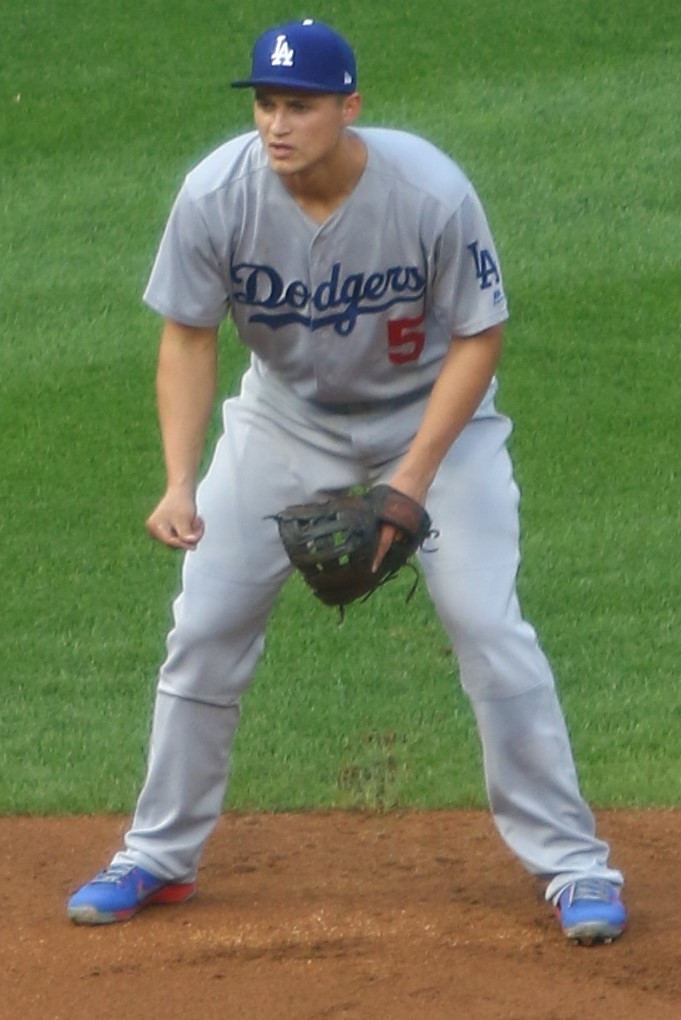
Corey Seager

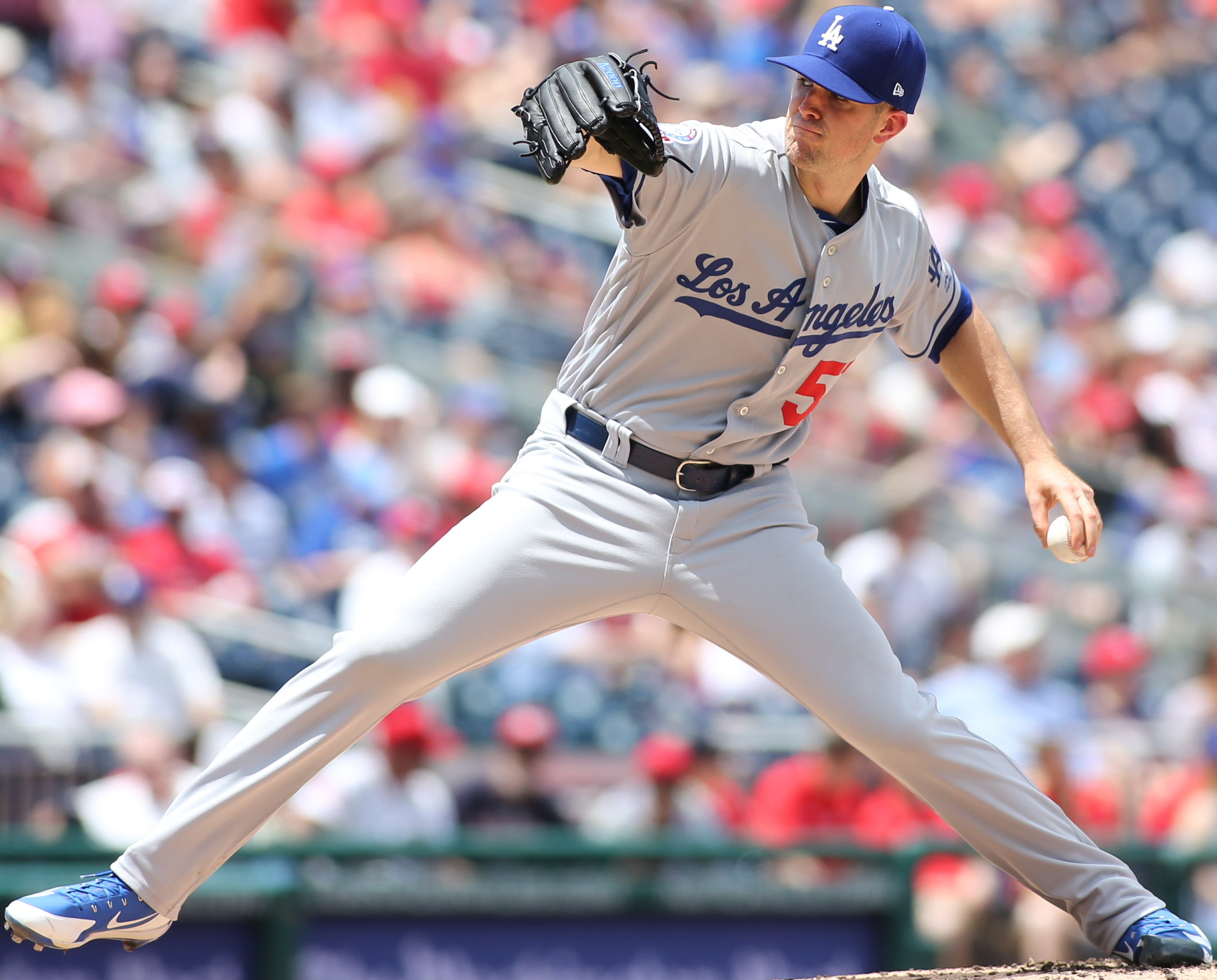
Alex Wood

- Saad Abdul-Salaam, soccer player
- Cedric Alexander, professional wrestler signed to WWE
- Jaire Alexander, NFL cornerback
- Ty-Shon Alexander, professional basketball player
- Arn Anderson, professional wrestler
- Darrell Armstrong, former National Basketball Association (NBA) player and current NBA coach
- Bryan Battle, MMA fighter
- Jim Beatty, first person to break the four-minute mile barrier on an indoor track
- Ricky Berens, Olympic swimmer and two-time gold medalist
- DeAndre' Bembry, NBA player
- Saddiq Bey, NBA player
- Tessa Blanchard, professional wrestler
- Garrett Bradbury, National Football League (NFL) offensive lineman for the Minnesota Vikings
- Calvin Brock, former professional boxer; competed at the 2000 Summer Olympics
- William Byron, NASCAR Cup Series driver for Hendrick Motorsports
- Maya Caldwell, WNBA player for the Atlanta Dream
- Chris Canty, former NFL defensive end; Charlotte Latin School alumni
- Dwight Clark, NFL wide receiver and two-time Super Bowl champion with San Francisco 49ers
- Jacob Coggins, soccer player
- Stu Cole, former Major League Baseball (MLB) player and current MLB coach
- Mo Collins, NFL lineman for the Oakland Raiders
- Carlos Crawford, former MLB pitcher
- Seth Curry, NBA player
- Stephen Curry, NBA player and 4-time champion with the Golden State Warriors
- Bo Davidson, MLB outfielder; played for San Francisco Giants, 2026–present
- Baron Davis, former professional basketball player; played for Charlotte Hornets 1999–2002
- Jordan Davis, NFL defensive tackle for the Philadelphia Eagles
- Jake Delhomme, former NFL quarterback for the Carolina Panthers, 2003–2009
- Claudia Dickey, soccer player
- John Donaldson, former MLB second baseman
- Devon Dotson, NBA G League basketball player
- Ray Durham, MLB second baseman and two-time All-Star selection
- Charlotte Flair, professional wrestler, daughter of Ric Flair
- Reid Flair, professional wrestler, son of Ric Flair
- DeShaun Foster, born in Charlotte, former running back for Carolina Panthers 2002–2007
- Todd Fuller, professional basketball player
- Joe Gibbs, Hall of Fame football coach and NASCAR championship team owner
- Grace Glenn, artistic gymnast
- Trent Guy, former NFL and Canadian Football League player
- Clayton Heafner, former PGA Tour golfer
- Larry Hefner, former NFL linebacker
- Tommy Helms, MLB player
- Gerald Henderson Jr., former professional basketball player
- Dwight Howard, Charlotte Hornets 2017–2018, NBA player
- D. J. Humphries, NFL offensive tackle
- Antawn Jamison, NBA forward and former University of North Carolina basketball star
- Bobby Jones, basketball player, four-time NBA All-Star and 1972 Olympian
- Daniel Jones, NFL quarterback for New York Giants; attended Charlotte Latin School
- Impa Kasanganay, MMA fighter
- Hunter Kemper, triathlete, 4-time member of the U.S. Olympic team (2000, 2004, 2008, 2012)
- Braxton Key, professional basketball player
- Ron "The Truth" Killings, pro wrestler
- Luke Kuechly, former linebacker for the Carolina Panthers 2012–2019
- Corey LaJoie, NASCAR Cup Series driver
- Kendall Lamm, NFL offensive tackle for the Tennessee Titans
- Chris Leak, former Florida Gators quarterback and offensive MVP of 2007 BCS National Championship Game
- Dave Lemonds, pitcher for Chicago White Sox
- Nick Leverett, NFL offensive guard for the Tampa Bay Buccaneers
- Michael Macchiavello, freestyle and folkstyle wrestler, NCAA Wrestling national champion at NC State
- Mohamed Massaquoi, NFL player
- Alex Maughan, rugby union player
- J. B. Mauney, professional bull rider
- Drake Maye, NFL quarterback for the Patriots
- Jeff McInnis, NBA guard
- Mildred Meacham, All-American Girls Professional Baseball League player
- Kennedy Meeks, NBA player
- Sam Mills, linebacker who played twelve seasons in the NFL for the New Orleans Saints and Carolina Panthers
- Akil Mitchell, American-Panamanian basketball player for Maccabi Rishon LeZion of the Israeli Premier League
- Tiffany Mitchell, WNBA player
- Anthony Morrow, NBA player
- Alonzo Mourning, former professional basketball player
- Daniel Naroditsky, chess grandmaster
- Joan Nesbit, former long-distance runner who competed in the 1996 Summer Olympics
- Hakeem Nicks, former NFL wide receiver for New York Giants
- Dickie Noles, MLB pitcher
- Pettis Norman, NFL tight end for the Dallas Cowboys
- Ayanga Okpokowuruk, football player
- Julius Peppers, former defensive end for the Carolina Panthers 2002–2009 and again 2017–2018
- Richard Petty, former seven-time NASCAR Cup Series champion and record winner of 200 NASCAR races
- Roman Phifer, NFL linebacker
- Ian Pilcher, soccer player
- Wali Rainer, NFL player for Cleveland Browns, Jacksonville Jaguars, Detroit Lions and Houston Texans
- Jeff Reed, former NFL kicker for the Pittsburgh Steelers
- Cody Rhodes, professional wrestler
- Jerry Richardson, former owner of NFL's Carolina Panthers
- Jordan Rinaldi, UFC fighter
- John Sadri, tennis player, Australian Open singles finalist
- Titus Sandy Jr, soccer player
- Don Schollander, six-time Olympic champion swimmer
- Corey Seager, MLB shortstop for the Texas Rangers
- Kyle Seager, former MLB third baseman for the Seattle Mariners
- Floyd Simmons, two-time Olympic bronze medalist in the decathlon
- Jamie Skeen, basketball player, plays for Maccabi Ashdod B.C. in the Israeli Super League
- Ish Smith, NBA player
- Jaden Springer, professional basketball player
- Ricky Steamboat, pro wrestler
- Bernard Taylor, former boxer, compiled 481–8 record as an amateur boxer, qualified for 1980 U.S. Olympic team
- Chad Tracy, MLB third baseman
- Rayjon Tucker, NBA player
- Dolly Vanderlip, All-American Girls Professional Baseball League pitcher
- Dave Waymer (1959–1993), NFL safety for New Orleans Saints, San Francisco 49ers and Los Angeles Raiders
- Reggie White (1961–2004), NFL defensive end; career leader at time of his retirement in sacks
- Steve Wilks, football coach, former head coach of the Arizona Cardinals in 2018
- Grant Williams, NBA player for the Boston Celtics; Providence Day School alum
- Patrick Williams, professional basketball player
- Alex Wood, MLB pitcher
- Haywood Workman, NBA guard for Indiana Pacers

== Miscellaneous ==
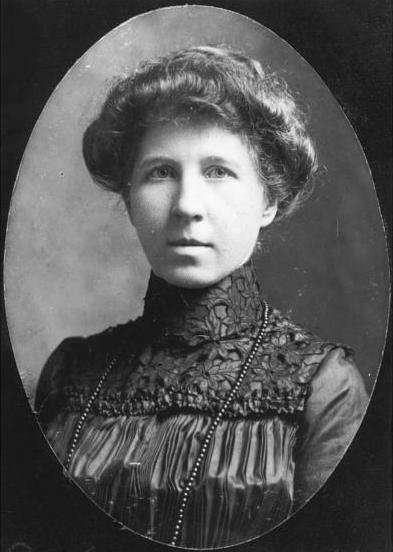
Annie Lowrie Alexander

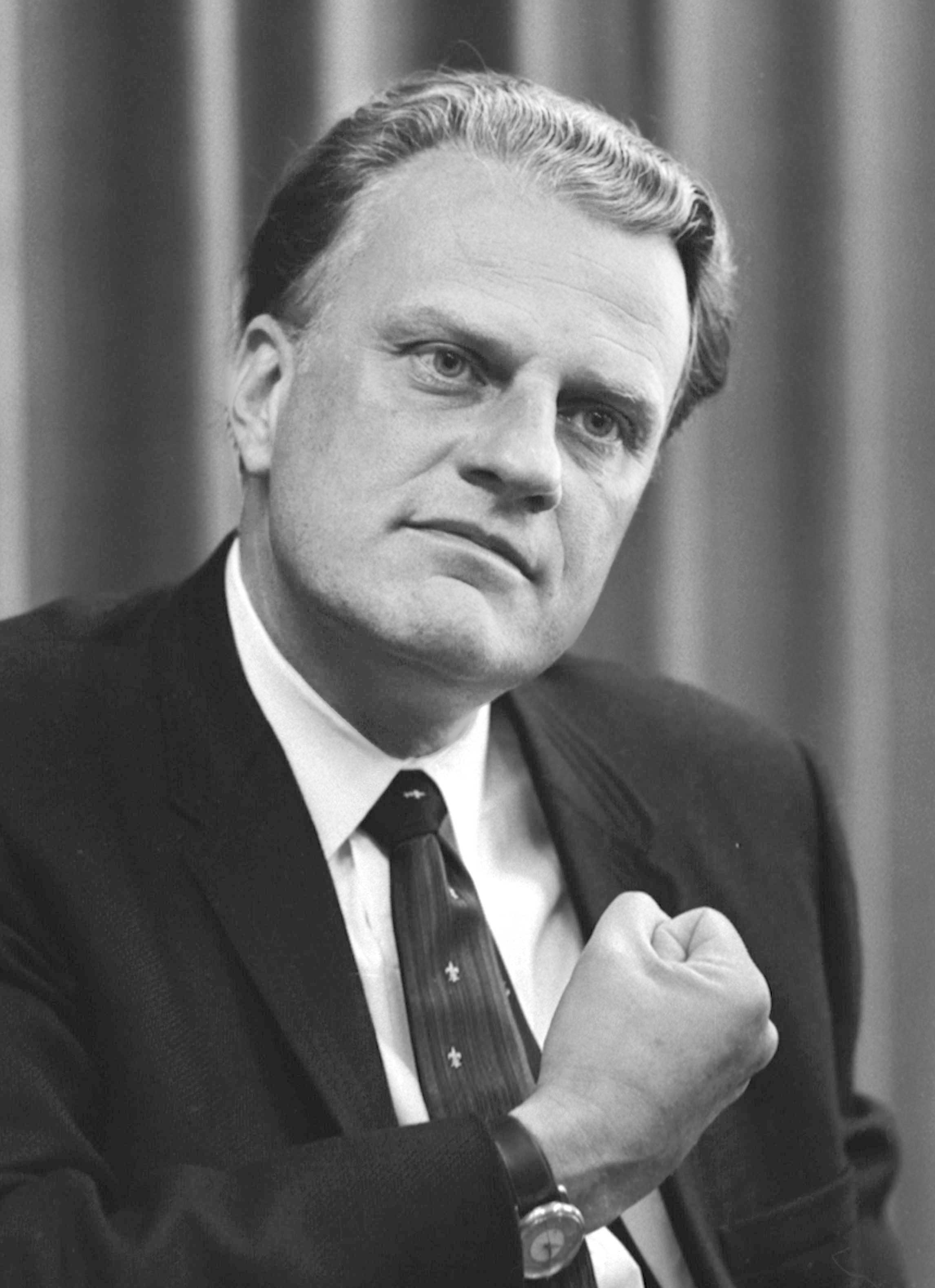
Billy Graham

- Annie Lowrie Alexander (1864–1929), first licensed female physician in the American South
- Chelsea Cooley, Miss North Carolina USA 2005, Miss USA 2005
- Olivia Culpo, Miss Rhode Island USA, Miss USA, Miss Universe 2012
- Brooklyn Decker, model, graduated from Butler High School in Matthews, NC; Sports Illustrated Swimsuit Edition cover model
- Thereasea Elder (1927–2021), first African American public health nurse in Charlotte
- Steven Furtick, pastor
- Ryan C. Gordon, software and game porter
- Billy Graham (1918–2018), evangelist
- Vani Hari, author, activist, and affiliate marketer who criticizes the food industry
- Carter Heyward, feminist theologian and priest in the Episcopal Church, the province of the worldwide Anglican Communion in the United States
- Richard Hipp, software architect and primary author of SQLite
- Peter Joseph Jugis, prelate of the Roman Catholic Church serving as the fourth and current bishop of the Roman Catholic Diocese of Charlotte
- Jordan Lloyd, winner of Season 11 of Big Brother; contestant on Season 16 of The Amazing Race (from suburban Matthews)
- Emily Maynard, The Bachelorette, season 8
- Sally Dalton Robinson, philanthropist
- John Shelby Spong (1931–2021), retired bishop of Episcopal Diocese of Newark, author, lecturer, and theologian
- Jane Renwick Smedburg Wilkes (1827–1913), founder of Good Samaritan Hospital and St. Peter's Hospital
