= Keith Scott =

Keith Scott may refer to:

- Keith Scott (voice actor) (born 1953), Australian voice actor, impressionist and animation historian
- Keith Scott (musician) (born 1954), Canadian guitar player
- Keith Scott (footballer) (born 1967), former professional footballer
- Keith Scott (One Tree Hill), character on the American TV series
- Keith Lamont Scott (1973–2016), an African-American fatally shot by police in 2016 in North Carolina
