= Garinger High School =

American school in North Carolina

Location
- 1100 Eastway Dr; Charlotte, North Carolina 28205; United States; 35°14′29″N 80°46′58″W

Information
- Former names: Charlotte High School (1908–1920); Alexander Graham High School (1920–1923); Central High School (1923–1959)
- Type: Public
- Motto: Where the world meets for class everyday
- Founded: 1908 (118 years ago)
- CEEB code: 340668
- Principal: Shannon Clemons
- Staff: 107.56 (on an FTE basis)
- Enrollment: 1,803 (2023–2024)
- Student to teacher ratio: 16.76
- Colors: Blue and gray
- Athletics: NCHSAA 8A
- Athletics conference: Greater Charlotte 7A/8A
- Mascot: Wildcat
- Newspaper: The Rambler
- Yearbook: Snips and Cuts
- Website: www.cmsk12.org/garingerHS

Garinger High School (sometimes referred to simply as Garinger or The G) is a high school located in Charlotte, North Carolina, United States.

== History ==
Garinger was in essence the relocation of Central High School, making it one of the oldest existing schools in Charlotte. The school's origins date back to 1908–09, when the class of 1909 received their diplomas in the first graduation of Charlotte High School. In 1920, Charlotte High School relocated to a larger building on East Morehead Street and was re-named Alexander Graham High School. In 1923, a new school building located on Elizabeth Avenue opened as Central High School. Central received all students who were attending Alexander Graham High.

In 1959, Central High moved to its current facility on Eastway Drive and was renamed Garinger High School in honor of Dr. Elmer H. Garinger (1891–1982), a former principal of Central High and superintendent of the Charlotte City Schools. The building was not condemned and Charlotte College, a night school, continued to operate from the old Central High building until it was absorbed by Central Piedmont Community College.

In early 2006 the school found itself threatened with closure by the State of North Carolina, but received backing from the City of Charlotte and Mecklenburg County.

=== Historical landmark ===
The Charlotte-Mecklenburg Historical Landmarks Commission is considering placing Garinger High School on their study list. If placed on the study list a motion would go before the city council who would vote on the issue.

=== Additional schools on campus ===
In the beginning of the 2006–2007 school year, two schools were inaugurated in the CMS system on the Garinger Campus. New Technology High School at Garinger, and International Studies at Garinger. The following year, three more schools were added: the School of Math and Science at Garinger, the School of Leadership and Public Services at Garinger, and the School of Business and Finance at Garinger.

- New Technology School at Garinger
- Math and Science School at Garinger
- International Studies School at Garinger
- Leadership and Public Service School at Garinger
- Business and Finance School at Garinger

Charlotte Mecklenburg Schools announced that the five small schools on the Garinger campus would become a one school again under the name of "Garinger High School," effective in the 2011-2012 school year.

== Campus ==
Garinger High School is located in East Charlotte at 1100 Eastway Dr.

Garinger's campus was designed by AG Odell, Jr. and Associates. The campus covers roughly 63 acres (250,000 m^{2}) and consists of several detached buildings, many of which have interior courtyards. Near the center of campus sits a unique circular building with a conical roof, which served as the original library. It has since been converted into classroom space and much of the interior integrity has been lost. A two-story library was added in the 1970s.

== Sports ==
Garinger's mascot is a wildcat, and the school colors are royal blue and gray. Garinger is a member of the North Carolina High School Athletic Association (NCHSAA) and is classified as an 8A school. It is a part of the Greater Charlotte 7A/8A Conference.

=== Football losing streaks ===
Garinger won a North Carolina football state championship the first year the school went under the name Garinger High in 1959. In the ensuing next couple decades, the team saw relative success, and produced NFL players such as multiple time Pro Bowl and Super Bowl champion Dwight Clark who made 'the catch' in the 1982 NFC Championship game, and Troy Pelshak who won Super Bowl XXXIV with the St. Louis Rams. Since the early 1990s however, the Garinger High football team has struggled.

From 2002 to 2007, Garinger was stricken by North Carolina's longest active losing streak. In September 2007 the streak reached a staggering 51 games before news broke of violations by North Mecklenburg, Providence, and Vance High Schools. Garinger was retroactively awarded wins against North Meck and Vance ending the streak. The streak was also reduced to 49 games as a result of having played Vance in August. Garinger's final record for 2007 was declared to be 4–7, the school's best record in well over two decades under Coach Chris Carter in 2008.

On October 6, 2008, while celebrating the school's 100th anniversary and homecoming, Garinger had their first honorable win against West Mecklenburg High School, beating them 32–12. They went on to end the season with a couple more wins and even made it to the North Carolina High School Athletic Association 2008 playoffs, the first time in 18 years.

From 2011 to 2017, Garinger was stricken by another long losing streak. This time spanning 6 seasons and 55 games. On September 8, 2017, the streak finally came to a close when the team beat Monroe's Central Academy of Technology and Arts by a final score of 42–0.

=== Honors ===
- NCHSAA Team State Championships:
  - Baseball (1930*, 1932*, 1965)
  - Boys Basketball (1931*, 1932*, 1933*, 1934*, 1989)
  - Football (1916*, 1917*, 1923*, 1929*, 1930*, 1932*, 1936*, 1937*, 1943*, 1959)
  - Boys Outdoor Track & Field (1923*, 1924*, 1925*, 1926*, 1927*, 1929*, 1930*, 1931*, 1933*, 1937*, 1938*, 1941*, 1942*, 1944*, 1952*, 1990)

(*) As Charlotte or Central High

== Notable alumni ==
- Sunshine Anderson, R&B artist, soul singer, and songwriter
- Jim Beatty, first man to break the four-minute mile on an indoor track (Central High)
- John Belk, business man, benefactor, and former mayor of Charlotte (Central High)
- Mary Gardner Belk, member of the North Carolina General Assembly
- Camilo Benitez, professional soccer player
- Dwight Clark, former NFL wide receiver, two-time Pro Bowl selection and two-time Super Bowl champion with the San Francisco 49ers
- Michael Colina, musician, composer, and producer
- Mark Davidson, MLB outfielder 1986–1991; member of 1987 Minnesota Twins World Series Champion team
- Walter E. Dellinger III, professor and solicitor (Central High)
- Sonny Dixon, MLB pitcher (Central High)
- John Donaldson, MLB second baseman
- Shalom Dutey, professional soccer player
- Chris Folk, served in the office of School Community Relations for Charlotte Mecklenburg Schools during desegregation and helped in implementing desegregation policies (Central High)
- Jack Helms, NFL player (Central High)
- Gary Hill, former MLB pitcher
- K-Ci (Cedric Hailey), singer/songwriter
- Tiffani Johnson, former WNBA player
- Van Kelly, former MLB third baseman
- Patsy Kinsey, served as mayor of Charlotte, North Carolina (Central High)
- Mary Norton Kratt, author (Central High)
- Charles Kuralt, award-winning journalist, CBS News Sunday Morning anchor (Central High)
- Doris Marie Leeper, sculptor and painter (Central High)
- Dave Lemonds, former MLB pitcher
- Grady Little, former MLB manager
- Dan Locklair, music composer
- Mike Martin, NCAA Division I baseball’s winningest coach and former Florida State head coach
- Robert Massey, former NFL player and current college football coach
- Tresor Mbuyu, professional soccer player
- Monk McDonald, former college athlete at University of North Carolina at Chapel Hill; member of North Carolina Sports Hall of Fame (Charlotte High)
- Sarah Parker, served as Chief Justice of the North Carolina Supreme Court
- Troy Pelshak, former NFL defensive end, Super Bowl XXXIV champion with the St. Louis Rams
- Robert Reid-Pharr, critical essayist and Distinguished Professor of English at the CUNY Graduate Center
- Jim Richards, former NFL defensive back, Super Bowl III champion with the New York Jets
- Brick Smith, former MLB first baseman
- Wally Shoup, musician who specializes in being a jazz alto saxophonist
- Floyd Simmons, two-time Olympic bronze medalist in the decathlon (Central High)
- Ken Wood, former MLB outfielder (Central High)

== See also ==
- Charlotte-Mecklenburg Schools

== Notes ==
- Garinger High School at Charlotte Mecklenburg Historic Landmarks Commission
- About Garinger at Charlotte Mecklenburg Schools website
