= Olympic High School (Charlotte, North Carolina) =

American public school in North Carolina

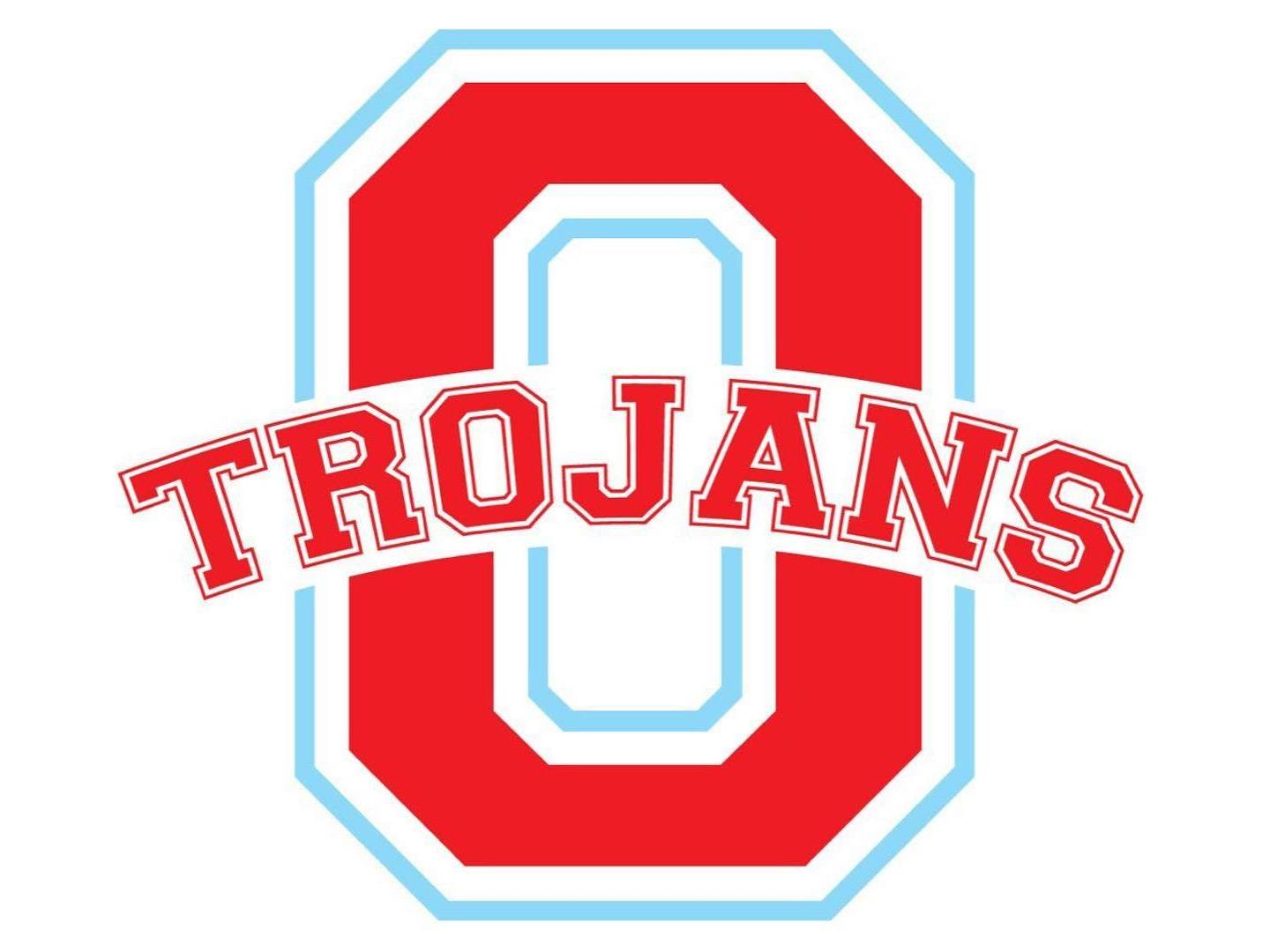

Location
- 4301 Sandy Porter Road; Charlotte, North Carolina 28273; United States; 35°09′28″N 80°57′08″W

Information
- Other name: Big O
- Type: Public
- Established: 1966 (60 years ago)
- School district: Charlotte-Mecklenburg Schools
- CEEB code: 341932
- NCES School ID: 370297001255
- Principal: Casey Jones
- Teaching staff: 88.55 (FTE)
- Grades: 9–12
- Enrollment: 1,500 (2023-2024)
- Student to teacher ratio: 16.94
- Colors: Red and Columbia blue
- Athletics: NCHSAA 6A
- Athletics conference: Greater Metro 6A/7A
- Mascot: Trojan
- Yearbook: Trojan Torch
- Website: olympichs.cmsk12.org

Olympic High School is located in Charlotte, North Carolina, and is a high school in the Charlotte-Mecklenburg Schools (CMS) system. Olympic opened in the fall of 1966, in what was then the rural outskirts of Charlotte. It joined the Coalition of Essential Schools in 2005, and was split into five smaller, theme-based schools. Olympic was consolidated back into one comprehensive high school the 2018–2019 school year.

== History ==
=== Beginning ===
Olympic High School opened its doors to students in 1966. When the high school opened it was in the rural outskirts of Southwest Charlotte in the Steele Creek community. Olympic opened as a comprehensive high school and remained as such until 2005.

Graduations

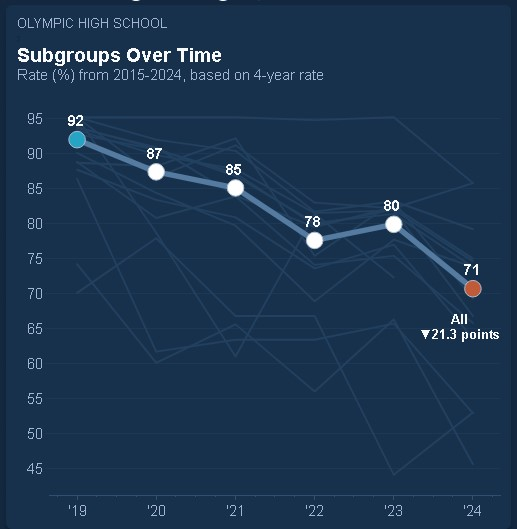
5yr Graduation Decline

Between 2019 and 2024 Olympic High School dropped from 92% graduation rate to 71%. The 21.3 percentage point drop was the most of any Charlotte-Mecklenburg high school. The school has the third worst state-wide graduation rate for traditional public schools with 1000 or more students.

Small schools

The small schools conversion began with the securing of a grant in 2005 from the Coalition of Essential Schools' (CES) Small Schools Project, a 5-year initiative backed by the education arm of the Bill & Melinda Gates Foundation. An initial $305,000 was received for planning. This planning process involved 5 committees of teachers, parents, and students forging out the specifics of each school of no more than 400 students, such as its themes and what part of the Olympic campus it would be located in. The hiring of principals and visits to other CES affiliated schools across the country were also covered. The results were presented at the end of the 05–06 school year to CES for a further $1.3 million for the next two years.

Students who were initially skeptical about being separated from their friends came to appreciate Olympic's more intimate atmosphere, which allowed principals to know them by name. The arrangement also presented challenges, including establishing channels of communication among the five schools.

Critics say the small schools movement is new, and few schools have produced long-term academic results. They also emphasize the importance of reform not stopping at smaller settings. For instance, generic courses driven by multiple-choice tests being replaced with challenging projects linked to real-life results. This involves a certain degree of experimentation and creativity that can be hobbled by district mandates, too many teachers relying on routine, budget restraints, and a test-driven culture instituted by an array of local and national achievement exams. There has been some success with project-based learning at Olympic, most notably with a 1,150-square-foot (107 m^{2}), three-bedroom Habitat for Humanity house for a family in northwest Charlotte built on school property by advanced construction students in Olympic's METS school, with the $70,000 required for the project raised in part by students in the Business school.

There has been an increase in involvement by parents and the community. Attendance for athletic events in 2006–07 was the highest since 1982, and a multi-million capital campaign was started by parents and community residents for facility improvements. The most recent incarnation of this fundraising is the Olympic High School Foundation, which raised $276,500 in 2015.

=== Former schools ===
Olympic's name from 2005–2018.

- The School of Biotechnology, Health, and Public Administration at Olympic (Biotech): 2005–2018
- The School of Math, Engineering, Technology, and Science at Olympic (METS): 2005–2018
- The Renaissance School of Arts and Technology at Olympic (Renaissance): 2005–2018
- The School of Technology Entrepreneurship & Advanced Manufacturing at Olympic (TEAM): 2014–2018
- The School of Executive Leadership & Entrepreneurial Development (ELED): 2014–2018
- The School of International Business and Communication Studies at Olympic (Business): 2005–2014
- The School of International Studies and Global Economics at Olympic (Global): 2005–2014

=== Consolidation into one school ===
The 2017–2018 school year was the final year of Olympic Community of Schools. In early 2018 it was announced that Olympic would be consolidated back into one high school after 13 years in the 2018–19 school year. In the 2018–2019 school year, the 5 schools were consolidated back into Olympic High School. Olympic is a comprehensive high school with one principal.

== Students ==
Olympic is one of a handful of high schools in CMS that straddle the line between a comparable number of low-performing, primarily urban schools and high-performing, primarily suburban schools, and thus its student body largely mirrors the district as a whole. For comparison, Olympic has an ethnic makeup of 44.3% Black, 34.4% White, 14.2% Hispanic, 6.0% Asian, and 1.2% Other (in the 2005–06 school year). CMS' demographics are 42.4% Black, 36.2% White, 13.6% Hispanic, 4.3% Asian, and 3.5% Other. Its pass rate on the 2006–07 North Carolina End-of-Course tests, used to sample knowledge and mastery of subject areas most students take as freshmen and sophomores, was 63.2%, near the CMS average of 65.7%. The graduating class of 2006, around 300 students, received $2.3 million in scholarships.

2019–2020 enrollment data shows that Olympic has 2,519 students. The breakdown for the school's demographics in the 2019–2020 school year are 45.5% Black, 16.0% White, 28.6% Hispanic, 6.2% Asian, and 3.7% other.

== Athletics ==
Olympic High School is a 6A member of the North Carolina High School Athletic Association (NCHSAA) and plays in the Greater Metro 6A/7A conference.

In 1970, the football team were NCHSAA 4A state runner-ups. In 2013, the men's basketball team won the NCHSAA 4A state championship. The women's outdoor track and field team won the NCHSAA 4A state championship in 2000 and 2021.

== Controversy ==
A student protest occurred on October 1, 2021 in response to the school's lack of action in regards to a student accused of sexual assault. Despite the student facing charges, he was allowed to continue playing on the school's football team and was not suspended from school.

== Notable alumni ==
- Thabiti Davis, former NFL wide receiver
- Allerik Freeman, professional basketball player
- Kenney Funderburk, professional basketball player
- C. J. Jackson, professional basketball player
- Chris Marcus, basketball player
- Tori Paul, member of the Trinidad and Tobago women's national soccer team
- Mike Shildt, MLB manager
- Beatrice Thompson, broadcast television and radio personality
