= Troy Pelshak =

Nigerian gridiron football player (born 1977)

No. 91, 54, 59, 95
- Position: Linebacker

Personal information
- Born: March 6, 1977 (age 49); Nigeria
- Listed height: 6 ft 2 in (1.88 m)
- Listed weight: 242 lb (110 kg)

Career information
- High school: Garinger (Charlotte, North Carolina, U.S.)
- College: North Carolina A&T (1995–1998)
- NFL draft: 1999: undrafted

Career history
- St. Louis Rams (1999); Minnesota Vikings (2000)*; St. Louis Rams (2000); Jacksonville Jaguars (2000); Barcelona Dragons (2001–2002); Carolina Cobras (2004); Columbus Destroyers (2005); New York Dragons (2006)
- * Offseason or practice squad member only

Awards and highlights
- Super Bowl champion (XXXIV)
- Stats at Pro Football Reference
- Stats at ArenaFan.com

Zenret Troy Pelshak (born March 6, 1977) is a Nigerian-born former professional American football linebacker who played two seasons in the National Football League (NFL) with the St. Louis Rams and Jacksonville Jaguars. He played college football at North Carolina A&T State University. He was a member of the St. Louis Rams team that won Super Bowl XXXIV over the Tennessee Titans.

== Early life and college ==
Zenret Troy Pelshak was born on March 6, 1977, in Nigeria. He was raised in both Oklahoma and North Carolina. He attended Garinger High School in Charlotte, North Carolina.

Pelshak played college football for the North Carolina A&T Aggies of North Carolina A&T State University from 1995 to 1998. He was inducted into North Carolina A&T's athletics hall of fame in 2014.

== Professional career ==
Pelshak signed with the St. Louis Rams on April 20, 1999, after going undrafted in the 1999 NFL draft. He played in nine game for the Rams during the 1999 season and posted six solo tackles. On January 30, 2000, the Rams beat the Tennessee Titans in Super Bowl XXXIV. He was waived on August 22, 2000.

Pelshak was claimed off waivers by the Minnesota Vikings on August 23, 2000. He was released on August 27, 2000.

Pelshak signed with the Rams again on September 5, 2000. He appeared in three games for the Rams, recording one solo tackle and one assisted tackle, before being released on October 4, 2000.

Pelshak signed with the Jacksonville Jaguars on December 4, 2000. He played in one game for the Jaguars during the 2000 season, posting one solo tackle. In February 2001, he was allocated to NFL Europe to play for the Barcelona Dragons. Pelshak appeared in ten games, starting nine, for the Dragons during the 2000 NFL Europe season, totaling 16 defensive tackles, 13 special teams tackles, and one forced fumble. Barcelona finished the 2000 season with an 8–2 record and lost in World Bowl IX to the Berlin Thunder. Pelshak started all ten games for the Dragons in 2002, recording 26 defensive tackles, one special teams tackle, one interception, and two pass breakups, as the team went 2–8.

Pelshak signed with the Carolina Cobras of the Arena Football League (AFL) on November 5, 2003. He played in eight games for the Cobras during the 2004 AFL season, totaling eight solo tackle, six assisted tackles, two sacks, one fumble recovery, and one pass breakup. He was placed on injured reserve on May 10, 2004.

Pelshak was signed by the Columbus Destroyers of the AFL on January 5, 2005. He was placed on injured reserve on January 24 and activated on March 4, 2005. Overall, he appeared in nine games for the Destroyers that year, accumulating six solo tackles, two assisted tackles, and one sack. Pelshak was waived on November 28, 2005.

Pelshak was claimed off waivers by the New York Dragons on November 29, 2005. He re-signed with the Dragons on January 2, 2006. He was activated on February 24, 2006. Pelshak played in one game for New York during the 2006 season.

== Personal life ==
Pelshak later became Chairman of the Charlotte International Cabinet.
