= List of killings by law enforcement officers in the United States, September 2016 =

This is a list of people reported killed by non-military law enforcement officers in the United States in September 2016, whether in the line of duty or not, and regardless of reason or method. The listing documents the occurrence of a death, making no implications regarding wrongdoing or justification on the part of the person killed or officer involved. Killings are arranged by date of the incident that caused death. Different death dates, if known, are noted in the description. The table below lists 84 people.

== September 2016 ==
Date	Name (age) of deceased	Race	State (city)	Description
2016-09-30	Richard Parent (37)	White	Michigan (Belleville)	
2016-09-30	Najier Salaam (18)	Black	New Jersey (Newark)	
2016-09-30	George Richards-Meyers (18)	Black	New Jersey (Newark)	
2016-09-30	Clayton Eugene Baker (38)	White	Texas (Groveton)	
2016-09-30	Jacquarius Robinson (20)	Black	Ohio (Columbus)	
2016-09-30	Douglas Marrickus Rainey (32)	Black	South Carolina (Campobello)	
2016-09-30	Hyer, Cheyenne (3)		Mississippi (Kiln)	Off-duty Long Beach police officer Cassie Barker (27) left her 3-year-old daughter alone in a patrol car while visiting her shift supervisor Sgt. Clark Ladner (36) in his home off Standard-Dedeaux Road. Hyer was found unresponsive in the vehicle after being strapped in a baby seat for four hours and was later pronounced dead at Hancock Medical Center in Bay St. Louis.
2016-09-30	Reginald Thomas Jr. (36)	Black	California (Pasadena)	Beaten and tasered which caused his death by Pasadena Police after Mr. Thomas called 911 for assistance due to his mental illness issues.
2016-09-29	Jeffrey Clair Cave (53)	White	Arizona (Kingman)	
2016-09-28	Johnathan Lozano-Murillo (28)	Hispanic	Georgia (Valdosta)	
2016-09-28	Christopher Sowell (32)	Black	Pennsylvania (Philadelphia)	
2016-09-27	John Ethan Carpentier (26)	White	Arizona (Phoenix)	
2016-09-27	Olango, Alfred (38)	Black	California (El Cajon)	Police were responding to a report of a man acting erratically when he pulled an electronic cigarette from his pocket and took "a shooting stance," prompting officers to fatally shoot him.
2016-09-26	Leeland White (32)	White	Arkansas (Little Rock)	
2016-09-26	Nathan DeSai (46)	Asian	Texas (Houston	Shot by police after committing a mass shooting on a residential street where he injured ten people.
2016-09-26	Anthony Bauer (52)	White	Idaho (Garden City)	
2016-09-26	Jamie Lewis (48)	White	Minnesota (Burnsville)	
2016-09-25	Cody Lafont (25)	White	New Hampshire (Claremont)	
2016-09-23	Oddis Colvin (33)	Black	Maryland (Pikesville)	
2016-09-23	Christopher Contreras (30)	Hispanic	Texas (San Antonio)	
2016-09-23	Jesse Attaway (41)	White	California (Fair Oaks)	
2016-09-21	Austin Baier (23)	White	Nebraska (Louisville)	
2016-09-20	Michael Goodale (23)	White	Connecticut (Mashantucket)	
2016-09-20	Joshua Scott (22)	White	Florida (Port St Lucie)	
2016-09-20	Keith Lamont Scott (43)	Black	North Carolina (Charlotte)	Police officers were looking for an individual (not Scott) with warrants out for his arrest. Keith Lamont Scott was said by his daughter to be unarmed, sitting in a car, reading. Police stated that they saw a man (Scott) with a gun leave his vehicle. Scott ended up being shot by officer Brentley Vinson.
2016-09-20	Sandy Duke (43)	White	Tennessee (Nashville)	Duke was shot by police officer Wesley McClelland outside a local recycling business. He was wanted for a robbery and home invasion committed earlier in the day.
2016-09-20	Charles Dove (35)	White	Tennessee (Route 641)	Police responding to reports of an armed robbery identified a car driven by Dove on Highway 641 as the car used in the robbery. Dove veered onto an embankment to avoid a roadblock before exiting the vehicle, at which point he was shot by police deputies.
2016-09-19	Thomas Tucker Jr (49)	White	Colorado (Westminster)	Shot by police after allegedly brandishing a weapon at officers.
2016-09-19	Michelle Miller (46)	White	Texas (Spring)	
2016-09-19	Gary Don Lafon (56)	White	Texas (Hawkins)	
2016-09-19	Jeremy Swenson (30)	White	Utah (Logan)	
2016-09-18	Philip Hasan (61)	Black	Ohio (Akron)	
2016-09-17	William Ryan (55)	White	North Carolina (Rutherfordton)	
2016-09-17	Robert Young (45)	White	Alabama (Huntsville)	
2016-09-17	Dahir Adan (22)	Black	Minnesota (St. Cloud)	
2016-09-17	Robert Duh (42)	White	California (Beaumont)	
2016-09-17	Tawon Boyd (21)	Black	Maryland (Middle River)	
2016-09-16	Lucas Anderson (29)	White	Kentucky (Owensboro)	
2016-09-16	Jesse Beshaw (29)	Native American	Vermont (Winooski)	Beshaw, who was wanted for burglaries and known to carry a weapon, was observed entering a residence by a city police officer. When he exited, he began running from the police and refused to adhere to commands to stop. He then aggressively advanced on sheriff Nicholas Palmier and was shot. Emergency medical aid was administered but Beshaw died at the scene. Beshaw was found to be unarmed.
2016-09-16	Terence Crutcher (40)	Black	Oklahoma (Tulsa)	Crutcher was shot once near his vehicle, as police demanded for him to raise his hands. No weapon was found on the scene.
2016-09-16	Nicholas Glenn (25)	Black	Pennsylvania (Philadelphia)	Glenn shot and killed a woman and wounded five other people, including two police officers, and was shot by police.
2016-09-16	Thomas Mone III (46)	White	Missouri (Hollister)	
2016-09-15	Joseph Schlosser (69)	White	Florida (Weeki Wachee)	
2016-09-15	Robert Carrillo (32)	Hispanic	Arizona (Phoenix)	
2016-09-15	Morgan Crocker (34)	White	Texas (Austin)	
2016-09-14	Dahir Adan (22)		Minnesota (St. Cloud)	Adan went on a stabbing rampage at the Crossroads Center, wounding ten people. He was shot by an off-duty officer.
2016-09-14	Tyre King (13)	Black	Ohio (Columbus)	King was shot by an officer as police responded to a report of a robbery taking place in a neighborhood. King allegedly pulled out a BB gun from his waistband, and the officer shot him.
2016-09-12	Markell Lamarr Bivins (25)	Black	Iowa (Cedar Rapids)	Bivins was shot to death by officers while attacking an ex with a knife.
2016-09-12	Christian Vargas (25)	Hispanic	California (Colton)	
2016-09-11	Terrence Sterling (31)	Black	DC (Washington)	Based on a report of a motorcyclist driving erratically, two MPD officers pursued Sterling who was riding home on his motorcycle after attending a bachelor party. Police stated that upon overtaking Sterling, he rammed their cruiser with his motorcycle. Officer Brian Trainer, sitting in the passenger seat, fatally shot Sterling in the neck and back. Body cameras were only turned on after the shooting had taken place.
2016-09-12	Eugene Craig (86)	Unknown race	California (Saratoga)	
2016-09-10	Adrian Joseph Shaffer (37)	White	Colorado (Longmont)	
2016-09-10	Dennis Claude Stanley (69)	White	West Virginia (Montcalm)	
2016-09-09	Travis Ell (64)	White	Auburn, Washington	Officers were reporting reports of vandalism when Ell approached them with a lead pipe. When Ell approached the officers with pipe raised and did not respond to commands to lower it, he was shot.
2016-09-09	Ricardo Tenorio (32)	Hispanic	Arkansas (West Memphis)	
2016-09-09	Gregory Frazier (55)	Black	Florida (Pompano Beach)	
2016-09-08	Juan Manuel Barajas Torres aka Jose Torres (38)	Hispanic	California (Delhi)	Merced County Sheriff Deputies were investigating a domestic disturbance report. Torres came out of the home with an assault-type rifle and shot Deputy Alejandro "Alex" Barba, striking him at least once. Deputy Adam Leuchner returned fire, killing Torres.
2016-09-07	Francis Perry (32)	White	Florida (Lakeland)	
2016-09-07	Jessie Daniel Joynt (35)	White	Florida (Titusville)	
2016-09-07	Robert Lee Brown (55)	Black	Georgia (Albany)	
2016-09-07	Donald Degraw (58)	White	Florida (Oldsmar)	
2016-09-07	Sadiq Bishara-Abaker Idris (25)	Black	Michigan (Wyoming)	
2016-09-06	Dylan Papa (25)	Black	Arizona (Phoenix)	
2016-09-06	Steven Del Rio (31)	Hispanic	Arizona (Tempe)	
2016-09-06	David L. Anderson (25)	White	Nebraska (Omaha)	
2016-09-06	Larry Grant Whitehead (70)	White	Tennessee (Gray)	
2016-09-06	Bernard Cottrell (65)	White	West Virginia (Spencer)	
2016-09-05	Michael Napier (33)		California (Oceanside)	Napier was working on his bicycle when police arrived to arrest him for drug possession. Napier was shot five times after reaching for his waistband, but he did not have a weapon.
2016-09-05	Moses Ruben (36)	Black	Texas (Ennis)	
2016-09-05	Cesar Garcia (35)	Hispanic	Texas (Austin)	
2016-09-04	Simon Gomez (44)	Hispanic	Colorado (Grand Junction)	
2016-09-03	Jose Romero	Hispanic	California (Long Beach)	
2016-09-03	Donny Max Daugherty (36)	White	Illinois (Brookport)	
2016-09-03	Cameron Ayers (25)	White	East Wenatchee, Washington	After stopping a vehicle he was in, officers recognized Ayers, who had an outstanding warrant for his arrest. While attempting to detain Ayers, an officer fired three shots at Ayers, killing him.
2016-09-03	Jerome Damon (25)	Black	New Jersey (Atlantic City)	
2016-09-03	Jeremiah "Jeremy" Richard Ramirez (27)	Hispanic	Texas (Temple)	
2016-09-02	Randall Rodick (40)	White	Colorado (Parker)	
2016-09-02	Michael Robert Musson Jr. (22)	White	Illinois (Round Lake)	
2016-09-02	Michael Thompson Jr. (38)	Black	Missouri (St. Louis)	
2016-09-02	Joseph Moreno (38)	Hispanic	New Mexico (Alamogordo)	
2016-09-01	Joshua Quintero (23)	Hispanic	California (Los Angeles)	
2016-09-01	Vicente Gonzalez	Hispanic	California (Huntington Park)	
2016-09-01	Caleb Douglas (18)		Kansas (Wichita)	
2016-09-01	Ed Holup (60)	White	Ohio (Toledo)	
