= Jack Helms =

American gridiron football player (1922–2002)

No. 52
- Position: Defensive end

Personal information
- Born: January 28, 1922; Charlotte, North Carolina, U.S.
- Died: May 20, 2002 (aged 80); Columbia, South Carolina, U.S.
- Listed height: 6 ft 4 in (1.93 m)
- Listed weight: 215 lb (98 kg)

Career information
- High school: Garinger (Charlotte)
- College: Georgia Tech (1940-1942, 1945)
- NFL draft: 1944: 17th round, 167th overall pick

Career history
- Detroit Lions (1946)

Career NFL statistics
- Field goals made: 3
- Field goal attempts: 4
- Field goal %: 75
- Stats at Pro Football Reference

John Ancel Helms (January 28, 1922 – May 20, 2002) was an American professional football player in the National Football League (NFL). He played for the Detroit Lions. He played collegiately for the Georgia Tech Yellow Jackets.
