= Richard T. Devereaux =

United States Air Force general

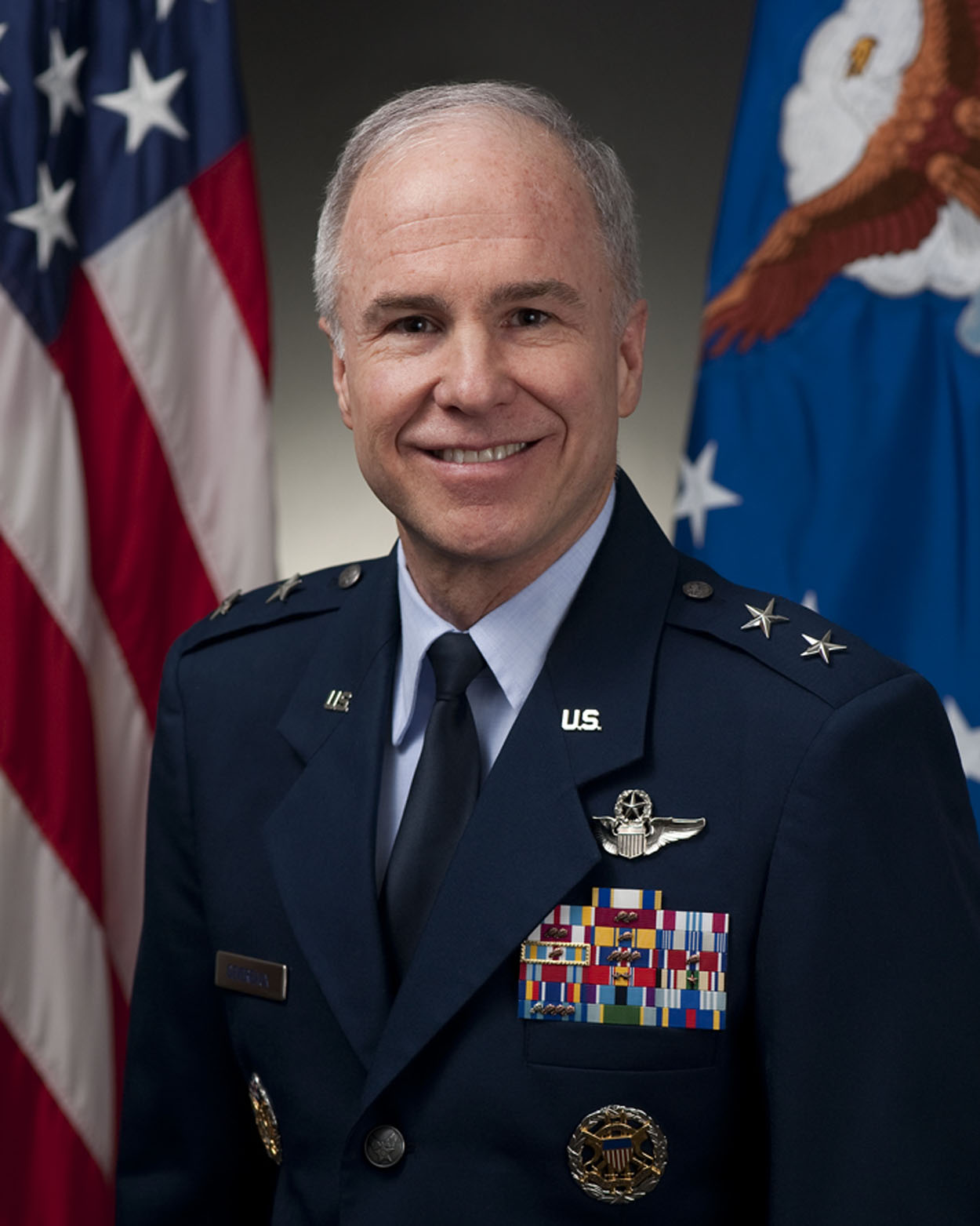
- Known for: US Air Force officer

Richard Thomas Devereaux is a retired Major General from the US Air Force. His last post on active duty was the Director, Operational Planning, Policy and Strategy, Deputy Chief of Staff, Operations, Plans and Requirements, Headquarters U.S. Air Force, Washington, D.C. His current position is Executive Vice President of Government Affairs for Viziv Technologies LLC.

== Academic career ==
Raised in Charlotte, North Carolina, Devereaux attended the U.S. Air Force Academy, Colorado Springs, Colorado. He graduated in 1978 with a Bachelor of Science degree in International Affairs.

== Military career ==
He retired from the US Air Force in 2012 at the rank of major general.

== Civilian career ==
In Feb. 2013, he joined The SPECTRUM Group (TSG), a consulting firm.

In his current position at Viziv Technologies General Devereaux oversees relations with Federal agencies regarding the development and regulation of long-distance wireless electrical power transmission. General Devereaux has been a strong advocate for moving the military toward more resilient, sustainable energy solutions and transmission systems. He volunteers for the Citizens Climate Lobby, where he focuses on the national security aspects of climate change and fossil fuel dependence.

== Bibliography ==
Devereaux, Richard T., The Microgrid Unplugged: Energy Surity Via Wireless Power”, Texzon Technologies LLC, Oct. 3, 2017

Devereaux, Richard T., “Cutting the Cord: Transforming Energy Through Global Wireless Power”, Viziv Technologies LLC, Nov. 2018.
