= Sandra Mims Rowe =

American journalist

Sandra "Sandy" Mims Rowe
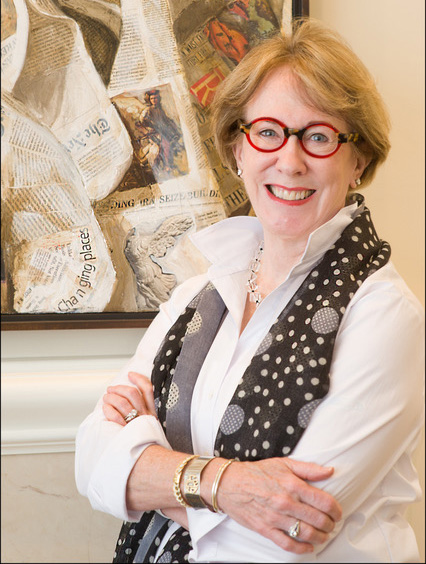
- Sandra Rowe in 2019
- Born: May 26, 1948 (age 78); Charlotte, North Carolina, US
- Education: East Carolina University
- Occupation: Editor
- Spouse(s): Gerard Rowe (married June 5, 1971)

Sandra Mims Rowe (born May 26, 1948) is an American journalist. She is the former editor of The Virginian-Pilot in Norfolk, Virginia, and of The Oregonian, in Portland, Oregon. She was one of the few women editors of metro newspapers in the 1980s, and was the first woman editor at The Virginian-Pilot and The Oregonian. She was the second female president of the American Society of News Editors, a decade after Kay Fanning, the editor of The Christian Science Monitor, was the first.

== Personal life and education ==
Rowe was born in Charlotte, North Carolina. She was raised in Harrisonburg, Virginia. At the time of her birth her father, D. Lathan Mims, was a reporter and editor for the Associated Press in Charlotte. When she was eight years old the family moved to Harrisonburg, where her father was the general manager and editor of the Daily News Record.

As a teenager, she accompanied her father on late-night visits to the composing room and pressroom, her favorite parts of the newspaper, and filled in for vacationing proofreaders. She graduated from East Carolina University in Greenville, North Carolina, with a degree in English in 1970. In 1990, she completed the Program for Management Development at the Harvard Business School. From 2010 to 2011, she was a Shorenstein Fellow at the Harvard Kennedy School.

== Journalism career ==
When Rowe was named executive editor at The Virginian-Pilot and The Ledger-Star at age 36, she was one of only three women in the U.S. in the top position at a metro newspaper. Previously, in quick succession in her late 20s and early 30s, she was a reporter, section editor, city editor, assistant managing editor and then managing editor of The Ledger-Star. In 1982, The Ledger-Star merged newsrooms with its sister newspaper, The Virginian-Pilot, and Rowe was named one of two managing editors of the combined newspaper, the largest daily in Virginia at that time. In 1984, she was named executive editor and vice president of the combined newspaper, which had a daily circulation of 225,000. Under her leadership, the newspaper won the Pulitzer Prize for General News Reporting in 1985, its first in 25 years.

She was editor of The Oregonian in Portland, Oregon, from 1993 until her retirement in January 2010. Under her leadership the newspaper won five Pulitzer Prizes, including the Public Service Prize in 2001 for a project led by Amanda Bennett that documented systemic problems within the Immigration and Naturalization Service.

Additional Pulitzers received by the publication during Rowe's editorship include the 1999 Explanatory Reporting Prize, the 2001 Feature Writing Prize, the 2006 Editorial Writing Prize and the 2007 Breaking News Reporting Prize.

At The Virginian-Pilot and The Oregonian, Rowe managed reporters and editors and focused on journalistic and ethical standards.

After she retired from The Oregonian, Rowe accepted a Knight fellowship at the Shorenstein Center on Media, Politics and Public Policy at Harvard Kennedy School for the 2010 and 2011 academic year where she researched the case for partnerships and collaboration in local investigative reporting.

In 2012, Rowe was the Gaylord Visiting Professor in Journalism Ethics at Arizona State University.

== Awards and honors ==
- 1998: East Carolina University Outstanding Alumni award, and was the university's commencement speaker in May 1997.
- 2000: Named to the Virginia Journalism Hall of Fame.
- The National Press Foundation awarded her the Benjamin Bradlee Editor of the Year for 2003.
- Editor of the Year. National Press Foundation, 2004.
- 2008: Editor & Publisher magazine named Rowe and Peter Bhatia as Editors of the Year.
- 2010: American Society of Newspaper Editors awarded her its National Leadership Award.
- 2010: The University of Missouri School of Journalism awarded her its Medal of Honor for her distinguished Service to Journalism and in 2011, the Livingston Foundation recognized her mentoring of scores of young journalists with the Richard Clurman Award.
- 2013: ASNE opened its convention honoring Sandy Rowe and Jill Abramson, two “breakthrough female editors.”

== Professional leadership ==
Rowe chaired the board of the Committee to Protect Journalists based in New York from 2011 to 2017, a time period in which its work and the finances supporting the organization greatly expanded. CPJ received attention in October 2016 when in an unprecedented action, Rowe issued a public statement on the potential threat Donald Trump posed to free press.

She chaired the Board of Visitors of the John S. Knight Fellowships at Stanford University from 2001 to 2017. As chairman, she initiated and led the board through redefinition of the mission, selection process and activities of the fellowships, changing from mid-career refreshment to a program defined by innovation and leadership in information businesses.

She served on the Pulitzer Prize Board from 1994 to 2003 and was its chair in 2002 to 2003.

In 1997 to 1998, she was president of the American Society of Newspaper Editors, the second woman to lead the organization since its founding in 1922. She led its committees and convention to focus on improving journalistic credibility, delivering the primary convention address in 1998, "Leading the Way Out of Credibility Crisis."

She was chair of The Knight Foundation Journalism Advisory Board, Miami, Florida, from 2000 to 2005. From 1999 to 2003 she was on the board of World Affairs Council, Portland, Oregon. She was on the board of trustees of James Madison University, Harrisonburg, Virginia, from 1991 to 1993.

She is a lifetime trustee of Willamette University in Salem, Oregon. In 2017 Rowe was appointed by Oregon Gov. Kate Brown to the Oregon Higher Education Coordinating Commission. She also serves on the board of directors of Oregon Public Broadcasting and the Oregon Nature Conservancy.

She is featured in the book, The Edge of Change, which highlights the influence American women have had on the news industry.
