= Annie Lowrie Alexander =

American physician

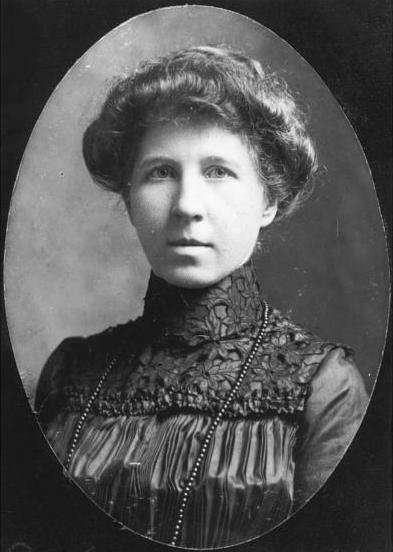
- Born: January 10, 1864; Mecklenburg County, North Carolina, U.S.
- Died: October 15, 1929 (aged 65); Charlotte, North Carolina, U.S.
- Resting place: Elmwood Cemetery; 35°14′16.08″N 80°50′53.16″W
- Education: Woman's Medical College of Pennsylvania
- Occupations: Physician; teacher
- Known for: First licensed female physician in the Southern United States

Annie Lowrie Alexander (January 10, 1864 – October 15, 1929) was an American physician and educator. She was the first licensed female physician in the Southern United States.

== Early life and education ==
Alexander was born on January 10, 1864, near the town of Cornelius in Mecklenburg County, North Carolina. She was one of six children of John Brevard Alexander and Ann Wall Lowrie, descended from the Reverend Alexander Craighead and the Reverend David Caldwell.

Alexander was heavily influenced by her father, also a doctor, to pursue the medical field after one of his female patients refused medical attention because she did not want to be treated by a male doctor and died as a result. She was educated by her father and a private tutor.

== Career ==
Alexander enrolled in the Woman's Medical College of Pennsylvania, graduating with honors in 1884. The following year, she obtained her license to practice medicine from the Maryland Board of Medical Examiners, earning the highest grade among 100 candidates.

Alexander started her own practice and was an assistant teacher of anatomy at the Women's Medical College of Baltimore. She returned to Mecklenburg County in 1887 to practice medicine, and in 1889 she bought a home in Charlotte, North Carolina. She slowly built up her practice, making her rounds on a horse and buggy before purchasing an automobile in 1911.

Alexander did postgraduate work at New York Polyclinic. Female physicians were not generally accepted in the late 1800s. Her work so shocked some of her relatives that they asked that her name not be mentioned in their presence.

Alexander worked as a physician at the Presbyterian College for Women (now Queens University of Charlotte) for twenty-three years. During Alexander's time in Charlotte, there were outbreaks of malaria and typhoid fever as well as a hookworm epidemic.

During World War I, Alexander was a first lieutenant in the United States Army and was appointed acting assistant surgeon at Camp Greene in Charlotte, where she performed medical inspections of the school children and grappled with the devastation wrought by the 1918 flu pandemic.

Alexander served as president of the Mecklenburg Medical Society and was a member of the United Daughters of the Confederacy, the Charlotte Woman's Club, and the Daughters of the American Revolution.

== Death ==
Alexander died on October 15, 1929, in Charlotte of pneumonia contracted from a patient. In 2022, she was commemorated with a statue by Jane DeDecker along Little Sugar Creek in Charlotte, North Carolina.
