= Toussaint Romain =

American lawyer

Toussaint Romain is a Public Defender in Charlotte. Romain became a key figure, civil rights leader, and peace-keeper during the protests of the Shooting of Keith Lamont Scott in September 2016. Romain was featured on live television several times both for interviews and as a peace-keeper forming a physical barrier between demonstrators and the police on the second night of the protests. Romain is also an adjunct professor of criminal justice and criminology at the University of North Carolina at Charlotte campus, where he instructs constitutional law..

In 2024, Romain was fired from his role as CEO of a local legal advocacy group after less than two years in the position.
