= Killing of Keith Lamont Scott =

2016 American police shooting

- Location of Charlotte within Mecklenburg County and North Carolina
- Date: September 20, 2016
- Time: Before 4:00 p.m. (EDT)
- Location: Old Concord Road, Charlotte, North Carolina; 35.29543°N 80.72708°W
- Filmed by: Police dashcam video, police body-worn camera video, and Scott's wife's mobile phone camera video
- Participants: Brentley Vinson (police officer)
- Deaths: Keith Lamont Scott
- Charges: None

Keith Lamont Scott was a 43-year-old African-American man who was fatally shot on September 20, 2016, in Charlotte, North Carolina, by Brentley Vinson, an African-American city police officer. It sparked both peaceful and violent protests in Charlotte.

The shooting prompted investigations by the Charlotte-Mecklenburg Police Department, the North Carolina State Bureau of Investigation, and the U.S. Department of Justice. As is customary for the department, Vinson was placed on paid administrative leave pending an investigation. In November 2016, county prosecutors decided not to charge Vinson, concluding that the shooting was justified.

== Backgrounds ==
=== Keith Lamont Scott ===
Keith Lamont Scott (February 3, 1973 – September 20, 2016) was an African-American man. He was married and had seven children. His neighbors stated that he had previously suffered brain damage in an accident and had difficulty communicating. He often parked his truck in a shaded part of the apartment parking lot, reading while waiting for his son's school bus in the afternoon. Scott had an extensive criminal record, including multiple cases of aggravated assault.

=== Brentley Vinson ===
Brentley Vinson, African American, has been an officer with the Charlotte-Mecklenburg Police Department (CMPD) since July 21, 2014. He attended Liberty University, studying criminal justice.

== Shooting ==
The shooting incident occurred before 4:00 p.m. in the parking lot of the Village at College Downs apartment complex, near the University of North Carolina at Charlotte.

Vinson fatally shot Scott while Scott was facing away with his hands at his sides. The officer was in plainclothes, wearing a police vest but not a body-worn camera. Three other officers on the scene were in uniform and wearing cameras.

=== Police account ===
According to police, Charlotte-Mecklenburg Police Department (CMPD) officers saw Scott exit a vehicle in the parking lot of his apartment complex while carrying a handgun, and refuse to comply with their orders to drop it. At a news conference on September 22, CMPD Chief Kerr Putney described Scott as an "imminent deadly threat." Chief Putney said that false rumors had been spread by social media. He told reporters that a handgun was seized at the scene.

Four days after the shooting, the CMPD released an updated statement of their account of the shooting incident, along with a dashcam video and a bodycam video. The statement said that the incident began as Vinson and another plainclothes officer were sitting in an unmarked police vehicle, preparing to serve an arrest warrant in an unrelated case. A white SUV pulled up and parked beside them, driven by a man later identified as Scott. The officers observed Scott rolling what they believed to be a marijuana "blunt", but they decided that the warrant operation had higher priority than the drug activity.

Soon afterward, Vinson claims he saw Scott hold a gun up, giving the officers probable cause to arrest him for the drug violation and investigate the gun possession. The officers left the area to retrieve equipment and don "marked duty vests" that would identify them as police officers. When they returned, they identified themselves as police officers and "gave clear, loud and repeated verbal commands to drop the gun". A uniformed officer arrived to assist and tried to break Scott's front passenger window with a baton.

Scott got out of his vehicle, backing away from the vehicle while failing to respond to further commands to drop the gun. Perceiving Scott's actions and movements as an "imminent physical threat" to the officers, Vinson fired at Scott, hitting him. Officers "immediately rendered first aid and requested Medic to respond to the scene". According to the statement, Scott was found to be wearing an ankle holster and the gun was found to be loaded. Police say that no book was found at the scene of the incident.

The statement said that lab analysis found Scott's DNA and fingerprints on the gun recovered at the scene. Police also released photographs of a gun, a holster, and a marijuana "blunt" which they say were recovered at the scene. Unnamed sources said the gun was stolen, and that the person who stole it said he had sold it to Scott.

=== Witness accounts ===
Scott's wife was a witness and disputes the officer's accounts. She says that Scott was non-aggressive: “He had no gun. He was not a threat. He was just not a threat, period. He didn’t have a gun, he wasn’t a threat. What is your purpose? What was your reasoning? Why" Ms. Scott also believes that Vinson, the only black officer at the scene, was not the shooter. “Because of the positioning, when the shooting actually occurred. Officer Vinson was to my left, further... he’s at a distance. He’s not a part of the interaction.” Scott's family and neighbors say that he was in his car reading a book when the incident began, and he was holding the book, and not a gun.

== Video recordings ==
=== Police videos ===
External videos
- Police dashcam on YouTube
- Police bodycam on YouTube
- https://www.theatlantic.com/news/archive/2016/09/keith-scott-footage-charlotte/501545/

Two police cameras recorded the incident—a dashcam and a body camera. The dashcam video shows that Scott exited his car upon commands to do so, and was walking backward with his hands at his sides when Vinson fired at him four times. Before the shooting, audio can be heard of police saying "drop the gun," and of Scott's wife saying "he doesn't have a gun." The bodycam video shows police aiming their guns at Scott, as well as Scott standing outside his car with his hands at his side, but does not show the moment of the shooting. As Scott exited the vehicle and was stepping backward, the right leg of his pants is seen to be raised, revealing something dark above his shoe. There was no audio from the bodycam until after Scott was shot. Audio is not available at the start of the recording because the officer failed to activate his bodycam until 30 seconds after he arrived at the scene. While video is recorded while the camera is inactive, audio is not.

Initially the police department declined to make the video of the shooting public, despite substantial public pressure to do so from activists, community leaders, the press, local clergy, the American Civil Liberties Union (ACLU), and William J. Barber II, president of the NAACP's North Carolina chapter. Although Putney did not initially make the video public, he allowed Scott's family and its legal counsel to privately watch videos of the shooting. After viewing the videos on September 22, the family asked that the videos be made public. On September 24, Putney announced that the department would release dashboard and body camera recordings taken by the police of the shooting. He also announced that they would release DNA evidence as well as the footage. The ACLU called on the CMPD to release all remaining video footage related to the incident. The CMPD responded that, while there may be additional footage from officers arriving after the shooting, there is no more footage of the shooting or the events preceding it.

In the statement issued by the family through its attorney, the family agreed with police that "[i]t is impossible to discern from the videos what, if anything, Mr. Scott is holding in his hands." But perceptions of the video otherwise diverge. The family said that Scott was not a threat; that he had obeyed when ordered to exit his vehicle "in a very calm, nonaggressive manner;" and that at the time the officer opened fire, Scott's hands "were by his side, and he was slowly walking backwards." Putney, the police chief, claims that the video supports the police's account, but admits that the video "does not definitively show Scott pointing a gun at officers."

=== Scott's wife's video ===
External videos
- Wife's cell phone on YouTube

On September 23, a recording of the moments that led to the shooting was released by Scott's family to the public. The footage was recorded by Scott's wife on her cell phone camera. She can be heard pleading repeatedly "Don't shoot him, he has no weapon." The footage shows police officers surrounding a vehicle in the parking lot. A male police officer can be heard saying "drop the gun." Scott's wife says, "He doesn't have a gun. He has a TBI [traumatic brain injury]. He's not going to do anything to you guys. He just took his medicine." She then says, "Keith! Don't let them break the windows. Come on out' the car." Then "Keith! Keith! ...Don't you do it" a moment before four shots are heard. The proximity of the two last statements has been the subject of speculation. In an interview on CBS This Morning, Scott's wife said that she said "Don't do it" to the officers who she could see changing their stances, getting ready to fire. While the footage does not show Scott being killed or officers firing their guns, gunshots can be heard.

== Investigations ==
In accordance with police department policy, Vinson was placed on paid administrative leave following the shooting. The Charlotte Observer reported: "As is standard procedure with any fatal police shooting, CMPD's Internal Affairs Bureau will conduct a separate but parallel investigation to determine whether CMPD policies and procedures were followed."

On September 22, at the request of Mecklenburg District Attorney Andrew Murray, the North Carolina State Bureau of Investigation (SBI) launched an independent inquiry into the shooting. Scott's family had requested such an investigation; under North Carolina state law, district attorneys must make a request to the SBI upon the request of the family of a person fatally shot by an on-duty officer.

U.S. Attorney General Loretta Lynch said that the U.S. Department of Justice was opening an investigation into the shooting of Scott. The Justice department sent four members of its Community Relations Service to Charlotte, and also offered the assistance of the Federal Bureau of Investigation and the Office of Community Oriented Policing Services.

=== District Attorney's report ===
On November 30, 2016, Mecklenburg District Attorney Andrew Murray announced that his office had decided not to charge Vinson and released a report of the investigation. Murray said that Vinson "acted lawfully" and that "All of the credible and available evidence suggests that he [Scott] was in fact armed."

Murray stated the following findings regarding a gun, ammunition, and ankle holster. At the time of the shooting, Scott had a .380 semiautomatic handgun with a round of ammunition in the chamber and had illegally purchased the weapon online. The gun fell to the ground after Scott was shot and was cocked, with the safety off, and with Scott's DNA on it. Store records suggested that Scott had purchased .380 caliber ammunition. Ammunition was found in Scott's vehicle. A surveillance video of Scott, which was recorded at a convenience store shortly before the shooting, showed his pants bulging at the ankle, which was consistent with an ankle holster.

Murray said that Scott did not raise the gun at officers but did not comply with police orders to drop it. He added that Scott was a deadly threat because reaction-time studies showed that a person could raise a gun and wound or kill before officers had time to react.

Murray noted that Scott's wife said he did not have any guns after January 2016. However, he added that a month before the shooting Scott's wife had a text message argument with her husband about a gun in his possession.

Scott's family expressed disappointment in the decision not to charge Vinson, but appealed for calm.

== Protests and rioting ==
2016 Charlotte protests and riots
- Date: September 20, 2016 – September 23, 2016
- Location: Charlotte, North Carolina, U.S.
- Caused by: Shooting of Keith Lamont Scott
- Status: Ended

Parties
Charlotte-Mecklenburg; NC National Guard; NC State Highway Patrol	Black Lives Matter; Local demonstrators

Casualties
- Deaths: 1
- Injuries: 23 police officers 9+ civilians
- Arrested: 45

=== Night of September 20–21 ===
Protests followed word of the shooting when the victim was identified as Keith Lamont Scott. The Charlotte Observer reported "The protesters began to gather as night fell, hours after the shooting. They held signs that said 'Stop Killing Us' and 'Black Lives Matter,' and they chanted 'No justice, no peace.' The scene was sometimes chaotic and tense, with water bottles and stones thrown at police lines, but many protesters called for peace and implored their fellow demonstrators not to act violently."

The demonstration eventually turned violent, as protesters threw water bottles and rocks at police (one officer was injured by a rock). Tear gas was deployed by police shortly before 11:00 p.m. Two police vehicles—a squad car and an SUV—were damaged. Three WBTV reporters were assaulted, one of whom was hospitalized after being hit in the head. One person was arrested. The Charlotte Observer reported that the "destruction late Tuesday and early Wednesday included blocking all lanes of Interstate 85, breaking into a semi-trailer and burning the contents inside, and looting a Walmart on North Tryon Street at about 3:30 a.m."

=== Night of September 21–22 ===
Over "a chaotic night of gunfire, tear gas and arrests in Charlotte's city center" on September 21–22, 44 people were arrested; nine civilians were injured; two officers sustained "relatively minor" eye injuries; and three officers were treated for heat-related ailments.

Police Chief Kerr Putney stated that protests were initially peaceful, as demonstrators lawfully gathered at Marshall Park from 7:00 to 7:30 p.m. Violence broke out at around 8:00 p.m. or 8:30 p.m., with people engaging in violence and vandalism, including jumping on cars, damaging property at EpiCentre, an entertainment complex uptown, and shutting down Interstate 277. WSOC reported that the crowd blocking the interstate threw objects at vehicles. Arrests were made for a variety of charges, including failing to disperse, assault, and breaking and entering; authorities said that they were reviewing video recordings and could make further arrests based on the investigation. The police used tear gas and rubber bullets to disperse the crowds. Amid the rioting and throughout the night, Toussaint Romain emerged as a peace keeper, acting as a physical barrier between police and protesters at times. The Charlotte light-rail system suspended service at around midnight due to the rioting. Violence and vandalism continued until about 3:00 a.m. Over the course of the night, rioters looted shops, set fires, threw rocks, and stole money from an ATM.

Most damage occurred at the EpiCentre, "where businesses saw their facades smashed and merchandise looted." Outside the Omni hotel, "the Charlotte Hornets NBA team store, a CVS and the EpiCentre Sundries were later looted." Vandalism occurred elsewhere; windows were smashed and other items were vandalized at the NASCAR Hall of Fame, Charlotte Convention Center, Hilton Garden Inn, and Hampton Inn. At the downtown Hyatt House Hotel, bricks were thrown through the window, and a valet and front desk attendant were punched in the face. A US Army veteran who recently retired from service after deployment to Afghanistan was out dining with his family and friends near the Charlotte EpiCentere and became separated from his group, he was approached by a group of 10 men who and assaulted the retired sergeant, the sergeant was punched in the face causing broken bones requiring surgery. As the outnumbered unarmed Sergeant fled the attackers one of them could be heard on a now-deleted YouTube video yelling "You’re in the danger zone, white boy!”

Following the night's violence, Pat McCrory, governor of North Carolina, declared a state of emergency in Charlotte upon the request of Chief Putney. McCrory ordered the deployment of the North Carolina National Guard and the North Carolina State Highway Patrol to the area.

==== Death of Justin Carr ====
One person was shot in the head during the night protests. The shooting occurred at North College and East Trade streets and was reported at around 8:45 p.m. Authorities stated that both the shooter and the victim were civilians; the Charlotte Clergy Coalition for Justice claimed that the individual was shot by police. Members of the elite Charlotte Fire Department tactical fire company unit immediately provided care to the shooting victim. The picture of Charlotte Fire Department tactical members extracting the unconscious victim made international headlines. The shooting victim, later identified as Justin Carr, age 26, was transported to the Carolinas Medical Center, where he died the next day.

On the morning of September 23, Rayquan Borum, age 23, was arrested and charged with the murder of Carr. Borum was indicted on first-degree murder charges on October 5. According to prosecutors, he confessed to the crime. He was found guilty by a jury on March 8, 2019, and sentenced to approximately 30 years in prison.

=== Night of September 22–23 ===
On the night of Thursday, September 22, Charlotte Mayor Jennifer Roberts imposed a citywide curfew of midnight to 6:00 a.m. On the night of September 22–23, in contrast to the previous two nights, protests were mainly peaceful and orderly, except for an event around 10:30 p.m. in which marchers briefly blocked John Belk Freeway (i.e., I-277), prompting a confrontation with police in which they were ultimately dispersed. Several hundred State Highway Patrol officers and National Guardsmen patrolled the city, protecting property.

By Friday morning, September 23, regular business activity largely resumed in Charlotte. Mayor Roberts announced that the curfew would be in effect again that night, meaning the streets had to be empty from midnight to 6:00 a.m.

== Reactions ==
=== Companies ===
Following the violence on the night of September 21–22, major companies in the region instructed or allowed their employees to work remotely in order to stay away from the area of disturbances. Among companies taking this measure were Bank of America (15,000 employees), Wells Fargo (12,000 employees), Ally Financial (900 employees in two Charlotte offices); Duke Energy (500 employees and contractors); and Fifth Third Bank.

=== Officials ===
In a statement after the chaotic night of September 21–22, U.S. Attorney General Loretta Lynch upheld the right of persons to peacefully protest and condemned violence. Lynch stated: "I urge those responsible for bringing violence to these demonstrations to stop, because you're drowning out the voices of commitment and change, and you're ushering in more tragedy and grief in our communities."

North Carolina Governor Pat McCrory said in a statement: "Any violence directed toward our citizens or police officers or destruction of property should not be tolerated."

North Carolina Attorney General Roy Cooper said in a statement: "Violence will not bring justice ... We must come together as a community to get answers and find a better path forward."

=== Scott's family ===
In a Facebook Live video after the shooting, Scott's daughter accused the police officers of shooting her father because he was black and of planting evidence. Scott's wife issued a statement on the afternoon of September 21 saying: "As a family, we respect the rights of those who wish to protest, but we ask that people protest peacefully. Please do not hurt people or members of law enforcement, damage property or take things that do not belong to you in the name of protesting."

== See also ==
- 2016 Milwaukee riots
- Shooting of Jonathan Ferrell
- List of incidents of civil unrest in the United States
- List of killings by law enforcement officers in the United States
- List of killings by law enforcement officers in the United States, September 2016
