= Chris Folk =

Chris Evans Folk (1930–2010) served in the office of School Community Relations for the Charlotte Mecklenburg County Schools during desegregation, in North Carolina, United States.

== Early life ==
Chris Folk was born on April 6, 1930, in Charlotte, NC. He attended Central High school and Duke University where he graduated with a BA in English and Education in 1952. He earned his master's degree from the University of Texas in 1953 and went to work in as an English teacher in Corpus Christi, Texas. During the Korean War Folk served in the US Army in the Medical Field Service School. After he was released from the Army, Folk returned to Charlotte and began his 37-year career with the Charlotte Mecklenburg School district. In 1962 Folk earned a Doctor of Education degree from Columbia University Teachers College.

== School career ==
From 1960-1976 Folk held a number of positions with the county. He served in the office of School Community Relations, Principle of Windsor Park Elementary, and Assistant Superintendent of Communications. In 1976 he was promoted to Associate Superintendent of Communications and help that position until his retirement in 1992. Folk helped merge Charlotte City schools with Mecklenburg county schools that created the Charlotte Mecklenburg School System in 1959.

Folk was responsible for educating the public regarding the Swann v Mecklenburg County Supreme Court Case. He worked with the school board to implement desegregation policies, provided workshops for school personnel to learn how to handle problems related to desegregation and set up a hotline as a way to respond to parents questions. In 1970 a bomb threat was called into Folk's home in response to his work with the schools. No bomb was ever found, and his family remained safe. He was awarded the Charlotte Public Relations Society's Infinity Award, and the Phi Delta Kappa's Continuous Outstanding Service to Education Award.

Folk died on September 23, 2010, at the age of 80.
