= Beatrice Thompson =

American journalist

Beatrice Thompson is a broadcast television and radio personality in the Charlotte, North Carolina metropolitan area. Thompson has been described as "The best talk talent in Charlotte, which has unusually strong hosts for a city its size."

Thompson works for two CBS radio stations, WBAV 101.9 FM and WPEG Power 98FM, as a talk show host and as a news and public affairs director. She was Charlotte's first African-American woman newscaster. She joined WBTV in Charlotte as a news anchor in 1980.

Her 1999 dispute with a former employer was described in the documentary film "Local News" about the banality of local TV news. Protesters claimed that attempts to induce her to resign were racist. She was inducted into the Charlotte-Mecklenburg Women's Hall of Fame in 2012. Thompson is a native of Charlotte, North Carolina.
