= Grady (surname) =

Grady is a surname of Irish origin. It is derived from the Gaelic Ó Grádaigh meaning ‘descendant of Gráda’ (‘noble’). The O’Gradys of Kilballyowen were a prominent Munster clan and sept of the Dal gCaís.

It may refer to:

== People ==
- Adrian Grady (born 1985), American football player
- Anthony Grady (born 1990), American football player
- Arthur Grady (1922–1995), British water polo player
- Benjamin F. Grady (1831–1914), American politician
- Christine Grady, American nurse
- Christopher W. Grady (born 1962), American admiral
- Claire Grady, American civil servant
- Clare Grady, American activist
- Dennis Grady (1886–1974), American athletics coach
- Don Grady (1944–2012), American composer
- Donald Grady (born 1951), Canadian ski jumper
- Ed Grady (1923–2012), American actor
- Henry Grady (disambiguation), multiple people
- J. Harold Grady (1917–2002), American politician
- James Grady (footballer) (born 1971), Scottish footballer
- James Grady (author) (born 1949), American writer
- Jo Grady (born 1984), British trade unionist
- Joe Grady (1918–2020), American radio personality
- John Grady (disambiguation), multiple people
- Kellan Grady (born 1997), American basketball player
- Kevin Grady (born 1986), American football player
- Kraig Grady (born 1962), Australian-American sound artist
- Lottie Grady (1887–1970), American comedian
- Lucretia del Valle Grady (1982–1972), American activist
- Mason Grady (born 2002), Welsh rugby union footballer
- Michael Grady (born 1996), American rower
- Mike Grady (disambiguation), multiple people
- Monica Grady (born 1958), British scientist
- Patricia A. Grady, American neuroscientist
- Patrick Grady (born 1980), Scottish politician
- Paul Grady, American police officer
- Rachel Grady, American filmmaker
- Richard Grady (born 1955), Canadian ski jumper
- Robert Grady (disambiguation), multiple people
- Sandy Grady (1928–2015), American sportswriter
- Shane Grady (born 1989), English rugby union footballer
- Tammy Hansen Grady, American recording artist
- Thomas Grady (disambiguation), multiple people
- Tommy Grady (born 1985), American football player
- Warren A. Grady (1924–2019). American judge and politician
- Wayne Grady (born 1957), Australian golfer
- Wayne Grady (author) (born 1948), Canadian writer and editor
- W. Mack Grady, American engineer
- W. Robert Grady (born 1950), American politician

== Fictional characters ==
- Alex Grady, lead character of the 1989 film Best of the Best
- Delbert Grady, a character in The Shining
- Owen Grady, a character in the film series Jurassic Park

== See also ==
- Grady (given name), a page for people with the given name "Grady"
- Graddy, surname
