= Grady =

Grady may refer to:

== Places ==
=== United States ===
- Grady, Alabama, an unincorporated community
- Grady, Arkansas, a city
- Grady, Mississippi, an unincorporated community
- Grady, New Mexico, a village
- Grady, Oklahoma, an unincorporated community
- Grady, Virginia, an unincorporated community
- Grady County, Georgia
- Grady County, Oklahoma

=== Poland ===
- Grądy (disambiguation)

== People and fictional characters ==
- Grady (given name), including a list of people
- Grady (surname), including a list of people and fictional characters

== Arts and entertainment ==
- Grady (band), an American cowboy metal band
- Grady (British TV series), a 1970 British television series
- Grady (American TV series), a 1975 American television comedy series that is a spinoff of Sanford and Son

== Other uses ==
- Grady Gang, a criminal group led by John D. Grady in New York in the 1860s
- Grady Memorial Hospital, Atlanta, Georgia
- Grady Memorial Hospital (Ohio), Delaware, Ohio
