= Grady (given name) =

Grady is a given name of Irish origin, derived from the Irish word gráda, meaning 'noble' or 'renowned'.

== Notable people with the given name "Grady" include ==
=== A ===
- Grady Adkins (1897–1966), American baseball player
- Grady Alderman (1938–2018), American football player
- Grady Allen (1946–2012), American football player

=== B ===
- Grady Benton (born 1973), American football player
- Grady Booch (born 1955), American software engineer
- Grady Brewer (born 1970), American boxer
- Grady Brown (born 1944), American politician
- Grady Brown (American football) (born 1977), American football player and coach

=== C ===
- Grady Cavness (born 1947), American football player
- Grady Champion (born 1969), American blues musician
- Grady Chapman (1929–2011), American singer-songwriter
- Grady Clay (1916–2013), American journalist and landscape architect
- Grady Cofer, American visual effects artist
- Grady and Hazel Cole, American songwriters
- Grady Cooper, American film director
- Grady C. Cothen (1920–2017), American minister
- Grady W. Courtney (1918–1994), American politician

=== D ===
- Grady W. Dalton (died 1986), American politician from Virginia
- Grady Diangana (born 1998), Congolese footballer
- Gradey Dick (born 2003), American basketball player

=== E ===
- Grady Emerson (born 2008), American baseball player

=== F ===
- Grady Fuson (born 1956), American baseball scout

=== G ===
- Grady Gaines (1934–2021), American musician
- Grady Gammage (1892–1959), American educator

=== H ===
- Grady Hall, American screenwriter
- Grady Hatton (1922–2013), American baseball player
- T. Grady Head (1897–1965), American lawyer
- Grady Hendrix, American author
- Grady Higginbotham (1892–1989), American football and baseball player
- Grady Howard (1911–1989), American politician
- Grady Hunt (1921–2013), American costume designer

=== J ===
- Grady Jackson (born 1973), American football player
- Grady Jarrett (born 1993), American football player
- Grady Judd (born 1954), American police officer

=== K ===
- Grady R. Kent (1909–1964), American theologian

=== L ===
- Grady Lewis (1917–2009), American basketball player
- Grady Little (born 1950), American baseball player
- Grady Livingston (born 1972), American football player

=== M ===
- Grady Martin (1929–2001), American musician
- Grady Mathews (1943–2012), American pool player
- Grady McDonnell (born 2008), Irish-Canadian footballer
- Grady Louis McMurtry (1918–1985), American occultist
- Grady McWhiney (1928–2006), American historian

=== N ===
- Grady Norton (1894–1954), American meteorologist
- Grady Nutt (1934–1982), American minister

=== O ===
- Grady O'Cummings III (??–1996), American political candidate
- Grady O'Malley (born 1948), American basketball player

=== P ===
- Grady Patterson (1924–2009), American politician
- Grady Prestage, American politician

=== R ===
- Grady Reynolds, American basketball player
- Grady Richardson (born 1952), American football player

=== S ===
- Grady Sizemore (born 1982), American baseball player
- Grady Stiles (1937–1992), American freak show performer
- Grady Sutton (1906–1995), American actor

=== T ===
- Grady Tate (1932–2017), American singer
- Grady Thomas (born 1941), American musician

=== W ===
- Grady Wallace (1934–2006), American basketball player
- Grady Ward (born 1951), American software engineer
- Grady Watts (1908–1986), American jazz musician
- Grady Webster (1927–2005), American botanist and taxonomist
- Grady Wilson (disambiguation), multiple people

== See also ==
- Grady (surname), a page for people with the surname "Grady"
- Grady (disambiguation), a disambiguation page for "Grady"
