= Billy Graham's 1959 South Cross Crusades =

Series of evangelistic campaigns by Billy Graham

Billy Graham's 1959 South Cross Crusades were a series of evangelistic campaigns (also referred to as crusades) conducted by American evangelist Billy Graham in Australia and New Zealand in 1959. This was the longest series of evangelistic meetings conducted by Graham outside the United States. It lasted 16 weeks, from February 15 to May 31, involving all Protestant churches except for two evangelical groups, and attracted over 3 million attendees.

== Preparations ==
The idea for conducting a crusade in Australia emerged in 1954 when Billy Graham met with the Anglican Archbishop of Sydney, Howard Mowll (who died in 1958), during the World Council of Churches meeting in Evanston. In 1955, clergy from Australia issued an initial invitation to Graham, which was confirmed in 1957 during his New York Crusade. Graham sent Jerry Beavan, a staff member of the Billy Graham Evangelistic Association, to Australia and New Zealand to assess the situation. Beavan visited Australian cities including Melbourne, Sydney, Adelaide, Canberra, Perth, and Brisbane, where he met with church leaders. At the time, more than half of Australia's population resided in these cities.

During preparations in 1958, Howard Guinness published a pamphlet titled I Object to Billy Graham, opposing Graham's visit to Australia. The pamphlet accused Graham of exporting Americanism and promoting an Americanized version of Christianity.

A total of 9,400 people were involved in preparing for the crusade – twice as many as in New York (1957) but fewer than the 23,000 involved in Los Angeles (1963). In every city Graham planned to visit, a series of prayer meetings was organized. In Sydney alone, 5,000 prayer groups were formed. Committees were established to reach all social groups, from doctors and students to Aboriginal Australians and Māori people.

Pentecostals and the Fellowship of Independent Evangelical Churches did not participate in the crusade. The Pentecostals had organized their own crusade in 1956, featuring another American evangelist, Oral Roberts. Roberts was poorly received in Australia, raising concerns among organizers that this could negatively impact interest in Graham's crusade. They initially anticipated Graham speaking to audiences of around 4,000 people.

== Course of the crusades ==
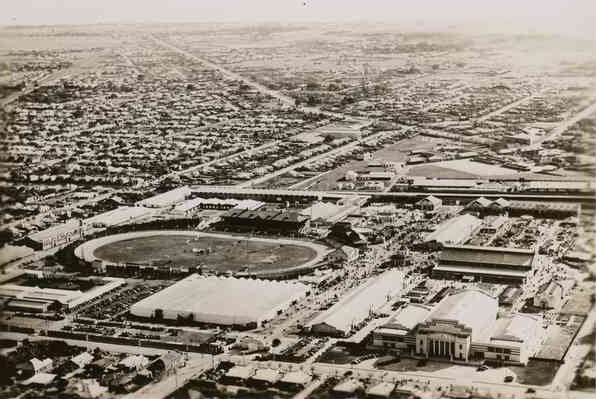
Adelaide, view of the Continental Hall where Graham preached

Some crusades took place simultaneously in multiple locations, with Graham relying on the help of other evangelists, especially in New Zealand. In Auckland, the evangelist was Grady Wilson; in Wellington, it was Leighton Ford; and in Christchurch, it was Joseph Blinco. Graham himself only preached at the conclusion of each of these crusades. In Adelaide, Joseph Blinco served as the evangelist, with Graham preaching at the last three meetings. In Perth, Grady Wilson was the evangelist, and Graham preached at the final two meetings. In Brisbane, Leighton Ford led the crusade, with Graham preaching at the last three gatherings.

The first meeting was held on 15 February 1959 in Melbourne. The most ceremonial event was the final meeting, also in Melbourne, on March 15 at the Melbourne Cricket Ground. According to official sources, 143,000 people attended this gathering. Queen Elizabeth II sent her representative, the Governor of Victoria, who read from the Bible, while President Dwight D. Eisenhower sent his greetings. The sermon's theme was communism, which Graham declared the greatest threat of the 20th century, stating that communism would never conquer the world.

The largest meeting occurred in Sydney, where Graham's team reported 150,000 attendees at the Sydney Cricket Ground and adjoining Sydney Showground, with over a million people listening to the broadcast on the radio.

After leaving Australia, Graham traveled to Europe. In Paris, he met his wife. In London, he attempted to organize a press conference, but British journalists showed little interest in events from the antipodes. While walking with his wife in Hyde Park and observing numerous couples embracing, Graham remarked that he "felt as if he were in a bedroom". This "incident" caught the attention of the British press. His behavior was even discussed in the British Parliament. A few days later, Graham met with Queen Elizabeth II at Buckingham Palace and shared details of his work in Australia.

=== Crusade locations ===
- Melbourne – February 15 to March 15, 719,000 participants
- Hobart – March 16, 25,000 participants
- Launceston – March 17, 12,000 participants
- Auckland – March 29 to April 4, 163,000 participants
- Wellington – March 30 to April 5, 59,000 participants
- Christchurch – April 1 to 8, 133,000 participants
- Sydney – April 12 to May 10, 980,000 participants
- Canberra – April 28, 25,000 participants
- Adelaide – May 13 to 26, 253,000 participants
- Perth – May 15 to 22, 106,800 participants
- Brisbane – May 17 to 31, 246,000 participants

== Results ==
A total of 114 evangelistic meetings were held. In Sydney alone, Graham preached to 980,000 people. The total number of participants across all cities exceeded 3 million (excluding radio listeners). Religion became one of the most significant topics in Australia and frequently appeared on the front pages of newspapers. Over 130,000 Australians – nearly 2% of the country's population at the time – dedicated their lives to Christ. Crime in Sydney dropped by 50%. Between 1960 and 1961, beer consumption in Australia was 10% lower compared to 1958 and 1959. While the post-war period in Australia saw a rapid increase in the number of out-of-wedlock births – almost doubling between 1955 and 1965 – the increase in 1960 was only 0.6%.

In New Zealand, attendance was estimated at 335,000, with 15,982 individuals dedicating their lives to Christ. Among the churches, Baptists were the greatest beneficiaries of the crusades, with 11.6% of converts joining their ranks. A similar number joined Presbyterian churches; however, while Presbyterians represented 10.7% of Australia's population, Baptists accounted for only about 2%. Membership in Anglican and Methodist churches also increased. Many future leaders of Australian churches were converted during the 1959 crusades, including Peter Jensen, Philip Jensen, and Bruce Ballantine-Jones of Sydney's Anglican Church. Peter Jensen went on to become the Archbishop of Sydney in 2001. Other notable converts included Ron Baker, a future Baptist leader, and Graeme Emerson Bell, a pioneer of Australian jazz. The crusades strengthened the fundamentalist wing of Protestant churches.

Billy Graham returned to Australia in 1968, 1969, and 1979. He visited New Zealand in 1969. In 1996, Franklin Graham led a crusade in Sydney and other Australian cities. To commemorate the 50th anniversary of the 1959 crusade, the Billy Graham Evangelistic Association released a DVD in 2009. The film highlighted the most prominent individuals converted during the crusade and argued that it reshaped the Australian church.

== Evaluations ==
Before Graham's arrival in Australia, the deputy chairman of the crusade committee, a Presbyterian minister, predicted that once the crusade concluded, people would say no one in history had ever preached the Gospel to as many people in one place in such a short time. During the crusade, Eric Baume, a columnist from Melbourne, pondered what set Graham apart from Australian evangelists and why his successes were greater.

On October 8 at the University of Sydney, when asked whether the crusade had sparked a spiritual awakening in Australia, Graham responded that such an assessment could only be made after 30 years.

The crusade was regarded as the most effective proclamation of the Gospel in Australia's history. It led to continuous growth in Australian churches for the next 15 years, with many Bible study groups formed during the crusade lasting 35 years or more. Evangelical circles believed that in 1959, Australia was on the brink of a genuine spiritual revival. Stuart Piggin, a historian of the evangelical movement in Australia, evaluated that while Graham's efforts did not prevent the decline of Christian values (the de-Christianization of Australia), they slowed the process.

Although Graham visited Australia three more times, he never replicated the success of the 1959 crusade. In 2002, John Russell remarked that the 1959 success was partly due to Australia's post-war appetite for all things American.

== See also ==
- Billy Graham's crusades in France

== Bibliography ==
- Graham, Billy (2010). "Na krańce Ziemi" [To the Ends of the Earth]. Taki, jaki jestem [Just the Way I Am] (in Polish). Translated by Marcol, J. THEOLOGOS. ISBN 978-83-927002-5-8.
- Piggin, Stuart (1989). "Billy Graham in Australia, 1959 – Was it Revival?". Lucas: An Evangelical History Review. 6. Archived from the original on 2016-03-05.
- Pollock, John (1966). "Sydney – The Pattern Crusade". The Billy Graham Story: The Authorized Biography. London: Hodder and Stoughton.
- Wirt, Sherwood Eliot (1997). "Why Me?". Billy: A Personal Look at Billy Graham, the World's Best-loved Evangelist. Wheaton, Illinois: Crossway Books. ISBN 0891079343.
