= 1978 visit by Billy Graham to Poland =

253rd evangelistic campaign of Billy Graham

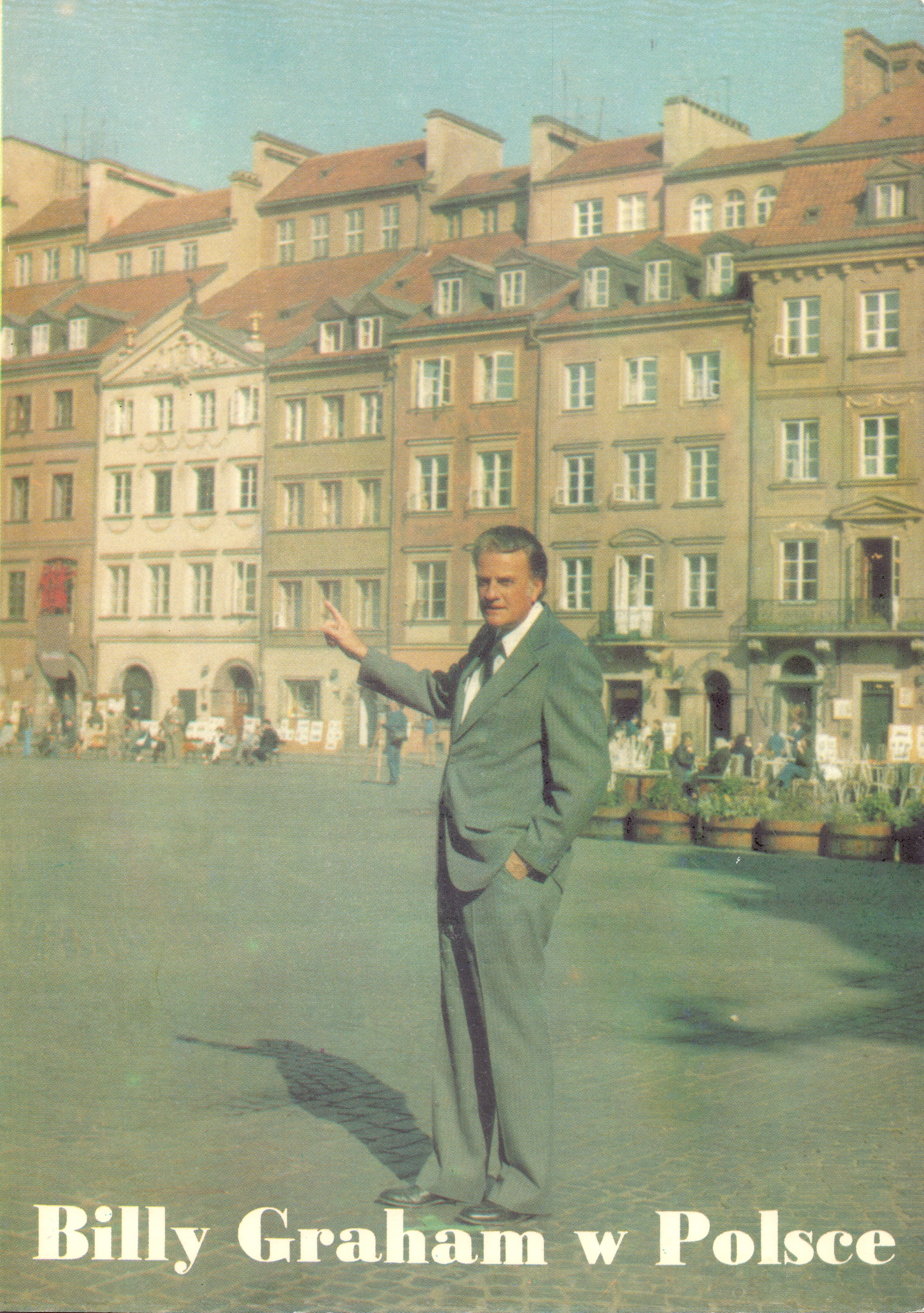
Cover of the book Billy Graham in Poland

Billy Graham, an American revivalist evangelist, visited Poland from 6 to 16 October 1978. Poland was the 57th country visited by the preacher. He stayed in the following cities: Warsaw, Białystok, Poznań, Wrocław, Katowice, Oświęcim, Kraków, Częstochowa, and again in Warsaw.

The visit was one of the most significant events in the history of Polish evangelical Christianity. It was also an important ecumenical event, opening a new phase of cooperation between Christian churches in Poland. Additionally, during the visit, Graham met with representatives of the state authorities, including Deputy Prime Minister Józef Tejchma and Minister Kazimierz Kąkol. Graham's interpreter was Father Zdzisław Pawlik, the secretary of the Polish Ecumenical Council. The visit was monitored by the Security Service.

== First invitation ==
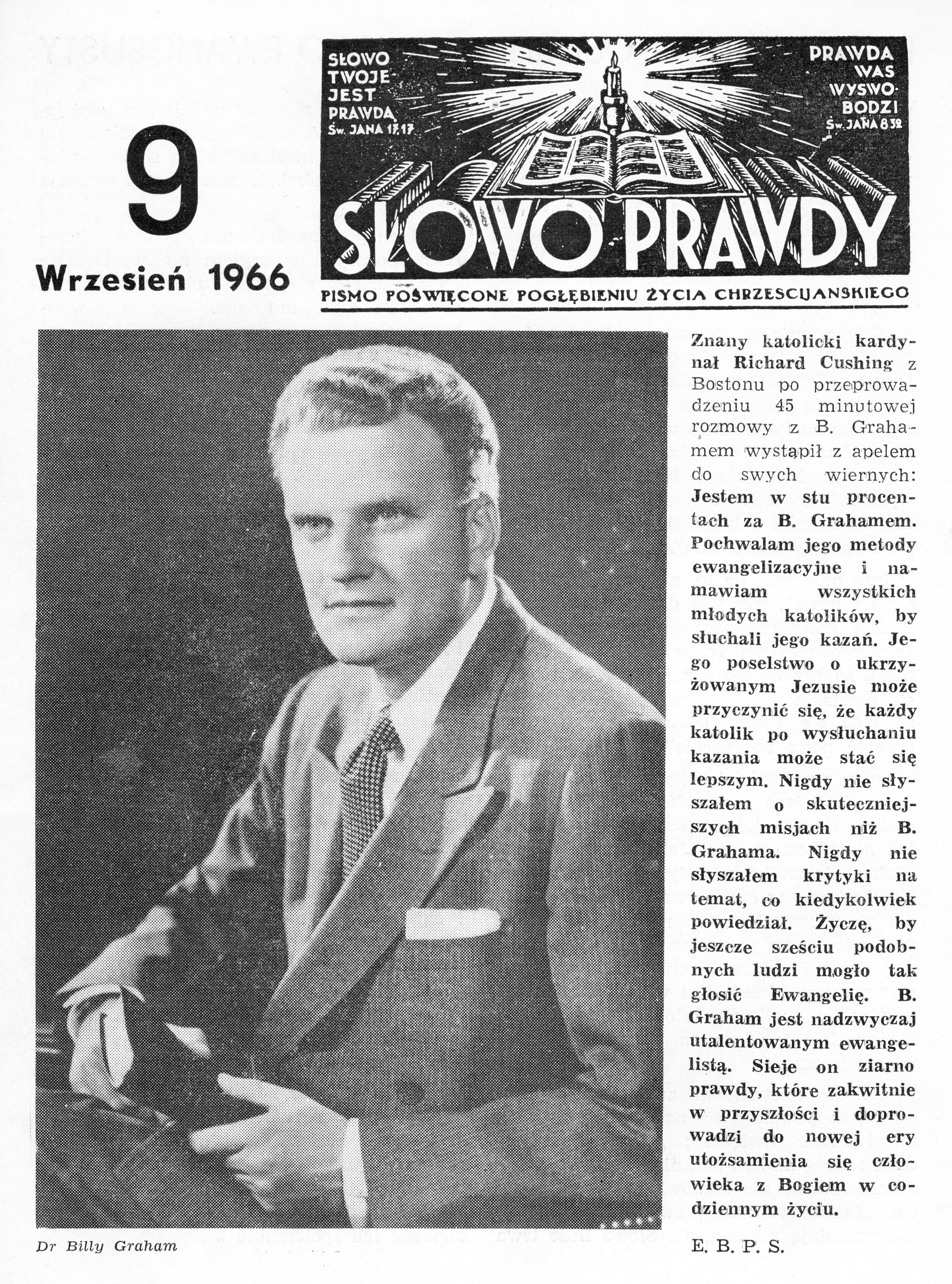
Słowo Prawdy magazine from September 1966

The idea to invite Billy Graham to Poland emerged in the 1960s. The Baptist Christian Church of the Republic of Poland aimed to invite Graham in 1966, the millennium year of the Baptism of Poland. Alongside Graham, they also intended to invite Pastor Martin Luther King Jr. The invitation was extended by Aleksander Kircun, the head of the Polish Baptists, in May or June 1966. Graham was to visit cities including Warsaw, Kraków, Oświęcim, and Wrocław. The program was to include participation from Protestant churches (Lutherans, Reformed). The organizers intended the visit to be confrontational towards the Catholic Church. At that time, no American evangelist had preached the Gospel in a communist country. A Berlin radio station remarked that if the Polish authorities permitted the visit of the "Protestant Pope", they should also invite the Catholic Pope. The communist authorities had previously denied Pope Paul VI entry, so they did not want Graham's visit, as a Protestant, to stir unnecessary controversy. In 1978, Tadeusz Dusik noted that the visit did not occur because B. Graham had a combative attitude towards socialist countries.

== Second invitation ==
On 11 October 1977, the Supreme Council of the Baptist Christian Church of the Republic of Poland requested the Office for Religious Affairs to allow Billy Graham's visit to Poland. This request came a month after his visit to Hungary, where positive feedback from Hungarian communists persuaded Polish authorities to approve the request. In February 1978, the Polish authorities granted permission. The authorities considered Graham's fame and influence in the United States, fearing a refusal could harm Poland's image. They also hoped the visit would improve Poland's image in the West.

Discussions were also held with the Latin Church and the Polish Ecumenical Council. Representatives from the Billy Graham Evangelistic Association (BGEA) visited Poland twice (in January and April). Initially, BGEA agreed to a 6-day visit (Graham received around 3,000 invitations annually), but the Polish side wanted a 12-day visit.

Zdzisław Pawlik, fluent in English and experienced in listening to Graham at various Baptist congresses, was appointed as the translator. He met with Aleksander Haraszti, Graham's advisor, who advised him to mimic Graham's tone, gestures, and facial expressions while translating: Those who understand English will be few among the listeners. People will listen to you as if you were Graham. Therefore, you must convey not only the sense but also all shades of emotional tension. Pawlik went to Sweden a month before Graham's scheduled visit to Poland, where Graham was conducting an evangelistic campaign, to observe his preaching style and prepare as the translator. There, he met Graham personally for the first time.

Before the visit, Graham sought advice on how to preach without offending the hosts and respecting their culture and customs. As a result, he omitted the humorous intros often present in his sermons directed at Americans.

Graham was accompanied by his wife Ruth, Walter H. Smyth (with his wife), who had coordinated the preparations for Graham's major New York Crusade and several other campaigns; Cliff Barrows, music director; Bill Fasing, organist and electronics specialist; John N. Akers, philosopher and lecturer; Myrtle Hall, vocalist; Aleksander S. Haraszti, missionary and Graham's advisor; and 16 other people. Poland was the 57th country visited by Billy Graham.

Graham's visit coincided with the 120th anniversary of the Baptist community's presence in Polish lands (celebrated in November). Just before Graham's arrival in Poland, the Słowo Prawdy publishing house released a special brochure, Evangelist Dr. Billy Graham, outlining his life and work. His book How To Be Born Again was also published in Polish. In every place Graham was scheduled to visit, a wide campaign of individual invitations was conducted. Announcements were made and evangelistic posters were displayed in all churches belonging to the Polish Ecumenical Council. They were also displayed in Roman Catholic churches.

== Progress of the visit ==
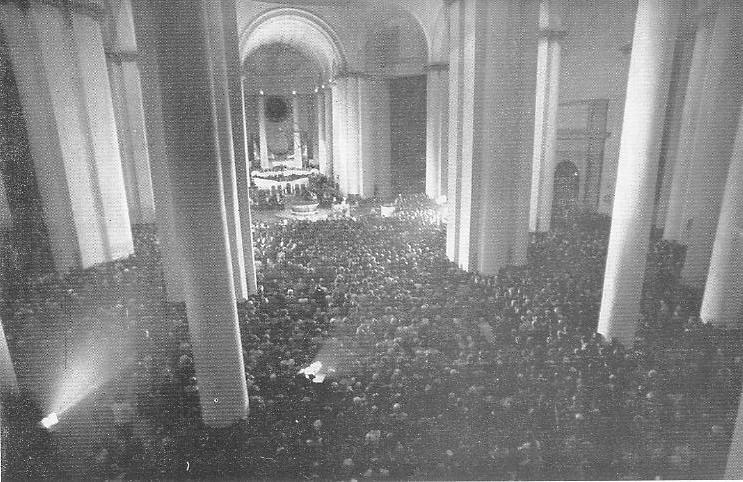
At the Cathedral of Christ the King in Katowice

Billy Graham arrived in Poland on 6 October 1978. He was greeted at the airport by Michał Stankiewicz representing the Baptist Church, Witold Benedyktowicz from the Polish Ecumenical Council, and Bishop Władysław Miziołek from the Catholic Church. Miziołek speculated that the majority of Graham's audience would be Catholics. Graham responded, saying, I am convinced that my visit to the Polish People's Republic is a sign of a new spirit in the world, a symbol of new directions and new hopes among Christians and nations alike. He also quoted words from Pope John Paul I's inauguration: Oh, how great are the riches and knowledge of God! How unsearchable are His judgments and His ways beyond finding out!

An official welcoming ceremony was held that evening at the Sofitel Warsaw Victoria, attended by representatives from various churches, state authorities, embassies, and journalists. Graham declared his mission: to preach the Gospel, learn about the social system in Poland, and build bridges in a divided world.

Graham preached in several Catholic churches (Warsaw, Poznań, Katowice, Kraków), as well as Protestant churches (Evangelical Reformed and Evangelical Augsburg in Warsaw) and Baptist congregations (Białystok, Warsaw, Wrocław). Prior to his visit to Poland, Graham had occasionally spoken in Catholic churches (e.g., at funerals), but he delivered his first full evangelical sermon in a Catholic church at the Poznań Cathedral. In Katowice, he spoke at the Cathedral of Christ the King, which was filled with approximately 10,000 people. Pointing to the cross above the altar, he explained the significance of Christ's death on the cross for all Christians. After his sermon, the hymn A Mighty Fortress Is Our God played on the organ at the back of the cathedral. In Kraków, he preached in the Church of St. Anne, for which he had previously obtained permission from Cardinal Karol Wojtyła. This was the first large religious meeting organized in the Katowice diocese.

In Białystok, where the Polish Baptist Church had its largest and most modern facility at the time, thousands of people gathered. Graham's sermon there was titled Return to the Father.

Graham paid several visits to state dignitaries, including the Chairman of the Parliamentary Foreign Affairs Committee Ryszard Frelek, Deputy Prime Minister Józef Tejchma, Kazimierz Kąkol, and Tadeusz Dusik, as well as the mayors of Kraków and Białystok. (Note: Graham claims that he had a private meeting with the First Secretary of the Polish United Workers' Party (Graham (2010, p. 528)).) He visited the Teletra factory in Poznań to learn about its production processes, the Children's Memorial Health Institute in Warsaw, Tykocin, Treblinka extermination camp, the Jasna Góra Monastery in Częstochowa, and Auschwitz concentration camp. He was the first Protestant to be hosted by the prior of the Jasna Góra Monastery. After visiting the Nazi concentration camp, he said: Auschwitz is a warning for all humanity – a reminder of one of the darkest periods of civilization. (...) It is also a monument to the courage and resilience of those who fought against the evil system it represented.

On October 16, the last day of his stay, a press conference was held at the Hotel Europejski, organized by Interpress. Graham made a statement in which he shared his impressions of his visit to Poland. He mentioned that it was the first time in his life that all the churches of a country had cooperated with him, and he hoped this would initiate a new period of ecumenism in Poland. He learned from Polish leaders about the country's housing problem, and his visit to Auschwitz made him aware of the real possibility of even greater atrocities in the future.

During Graham's visit to Poland, a conclave was taking place in the Vatican, and on October 16, as Graham's plane was landing in Paris, the conclave elected a new pope – John Paul II.

The German Baptist mission Licht im Osten used Graham's visit as an opportunity to bring a significant amount of Russian religious literature, including the Bible, into Poland. Urszula Ristau, a representative of this mission, was among those accompanying Graham.

== Supporting program ==
Evangelistic campaigns and visits by Billy Graham always included a support program. Alongside the main evangelistic efforts led personally by Graham, his associates and assistants conducted supplementary activities. Ruth Graham, Billy's wife, led a meeting for women from the United Evangelical Church. Cliff Barrows and Denton Lotz were guests at the Baptist Church in Warsaw and the Seventh-day Adventist Church.

While Graham was in Białystok, his assistants visited Katowice, Poznań, and Gorzów Wielkopolski. Cliff Barrows visited the Club of Catholic Intelligentsia in Kraków, and Denton Lotz was at the Higher Interdenominational Catechetical Institute. Ruth Graham and Ethel Smyth visited the Towarzystwo Biblijne w Polsce in Warsaw. On the second Sunday of the visit, Ruth Graham, Barrows, and Pashko from Canada visited the headquarters of the Mariavite Church in Płock.

== Reception ==
Before Billy Graham's arrival in Poland, there was minimal coverage in the Polish press about his planned visit. However, the religious magazine Słowo Prawdy had been providing regular updates on the upcoming event since April 1978. Similarly, the magazine Chrześcijanin offered detailed information about the visit's schedule, publishing both Graham's biography and his sermons. Mentions were also found in Mariawita. The Seventh-day Adventist publication Znaki Czasu featured an interview with Graham and included his photograph on the cover. Most religious publications either did not acknowledge the event or provided only brief mentions. The weekly Tygodnik Powszechny listed announcements for the service in Krakow. The atheistic socio-cultural weekly Argumenty published an article by Anna Pożarycka titled Who is Billy Graham, with an introduction by Andrzej Tokarczyk. Pożarycka viewed Graham from a sociological perspective, comparing him to an actor and calling him a director of a spectacle, criticizing his use of rally techniques. However, after the visit, the magazine acknowledged him as one of the most prominent preachers and Protestant evangelists of today.

During Graham's visit, Słowo Powszechne provided daily reports from October 9 to 19, with modest mentions and more extensive final summaries. Brief notes appeared in Życie Warszawy and Perspektywy, while Argumenty, in its Echo of the Week section, noted the press conference.

Post-visit, Gość Niedzielny published a series of articles. Religious magazines associated with the Polish Ecumenical Council used syndicated services to publish similar texts. Mariawita described the visit of Ruth Graham and Cliff Barrows to Płock. Przewodnik Katolicki, Tygodnik Powszechny, Biuletyn Ekumeniczny, and Słowo Powszechne featured extensive articles.

Przewodnik Katolicki published an article titled The Secret of Billy Graham by Father Janusz Tarnowski, who suggested that the secret to Graham's influence lay in the alignment of his words with his life. Tarnowski wrote:

Did he fascinate Polish listeners? Certainly, many were under a strong, unforgettable impression. He completely embodies the principles he has set: to speak with simplicity and love, with power, in connection with a personal lifestyle according to the Gospel. Humility and sincerity were palpable. Someone from the crowd whispered near me: 'This is truly a man of God!' Such a statement did not raise any doubts in me.

In Pielgrzym Polski (Kościół Ewangelicko-Metodystyczny), the Methodist Church's press organ, Olgierd Krzysztof Benedyktowicz wrote an article titled I, reflecting as a psychologist on Graham's sermon, ending with:

Perhaps asking questions and seeking answers about what is in Billy Graham, watching and analyzing his person, is safer for us than looking at OURSELVES, as we are, asking what is in ME, who I am, what do I want, how strong is MY faith?

International interest also emerged, with articles appearing in the Information Bulletin, Wort und Werk, and Die Kirche, where an American student critically evaluated Graham's visit to Poland, sparking a discussion in the magazine. The Swedish Baptist magazine Vec-Koposten reviewed the visit positively.

== Aftermath of the visit ==
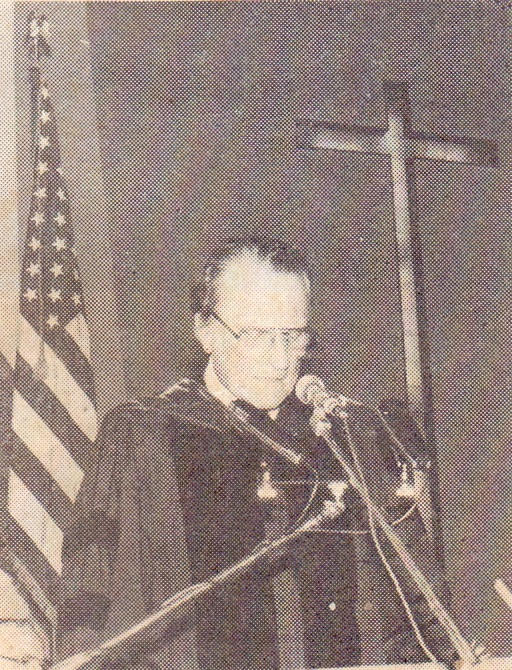
Billy Graham delivers a lecture after receiving an honorary doctorate

For the Protestant community, the participation of the Catholic side and the permission to conduct evangelism in Roman Catholic churches was a great surprise. It was suspected, including by translator Zdzisław Pawlik, that this was related to the election of a new pope following the death of Paul VI. The Roman Catholic Church hierarchy aimed to gain favor with influential American cardinals and persuade them to support the candidacy of Cardinal Karol Wojtyła from Poland. Others suspected that the visit of a great evangelist to a communist country resulted from political negotiations, with Graham serving merely as a conduit for important information between the East and the West. The visit also signaled to Western Christianity the extent of Poland's ecumenical progress – a Baptist preached in Catholic churches.

Graham speculated that the Polish government likely wanted to improve its image in American eyes by creating an appearance of religious freedom for its citizens and maintaining some degree of independence from the Soviet Union. He also suspected that Polish communists intended to use the Protestant evangelist to weaken the authority of the Catholic Church in Poland.

Bishop Herbert Bednorz called the visit the largest ecumenical gathering in Poland with international significance. He also praised Graham for his Christ-centered approach to ecumenism. Archbishop Henryk Gulbinowicz stated that the Polish Episcopate held the visit in high regard. Bishop W. Miziołek noted that Graham's message was evangelical in nature and far from sectarianism. The evangelism event in Katowice initiated ecumenical cooperation in Silesia.

Graham's visit opened a new stage of ecumenical cooperation, which was also appreciated by the Orthodox side. On 15 October 1979, Metropolitan Bazyli, head of the Polish Orthodox Church, awarded Graham the Order św. Marii Magdaleny (Polska).

From 5 to 8 January 1981, Billy Graham received an honorary doctorate from the Christian Theological Academy in recognition of his 1978 evangelistic campaign, which he personally came to receive. It was his 27th honorary doctorate. After the doctorate ceremony, he delivered a lecture highlighting the dramatic situation of the world, the arms race, and the need for actions to prevent evil.

In connection with the awarding of the honorary doctorate, Father Jerzy Gryniakow analyzed Graham's sermons and noted that in the first part of the sermon, he emphasized God's impending wrath, and in the second, the possibility of pardon if repentance occurred. The sermons were filled with examples from American life, were not overly intellectualized, did not contain complex constructions, were always biblical, and among the three types of sermons, he preferred the thematic homily. His sermons were not confessionally oriented, which Gryniakow considered rare. The sermon on the Prodigal Son delivered on 16 June 1969 in New York was considered typical of Graham.

Bishop Andrzej Siemieniewski wrote years later: Wrocław became particularly blessed [...] in 1978, the Gospel was preached here by the world-renowned Baptist preacher, Billy Graham.

Włodzimierz Batóg and William Glass assessed that Edward Gierek's team hoped for a good reception of the visit in the West, showcasing their openness and significance as an important European country. They also anticipated a propaganda dimension. The Security Service attempted, through its agents, to convince the evangelist's team that the religious policy conducted by the authorities was correct and created proper conditions for cooperation between the state and the churches.

== Institute of National Remembrance ==
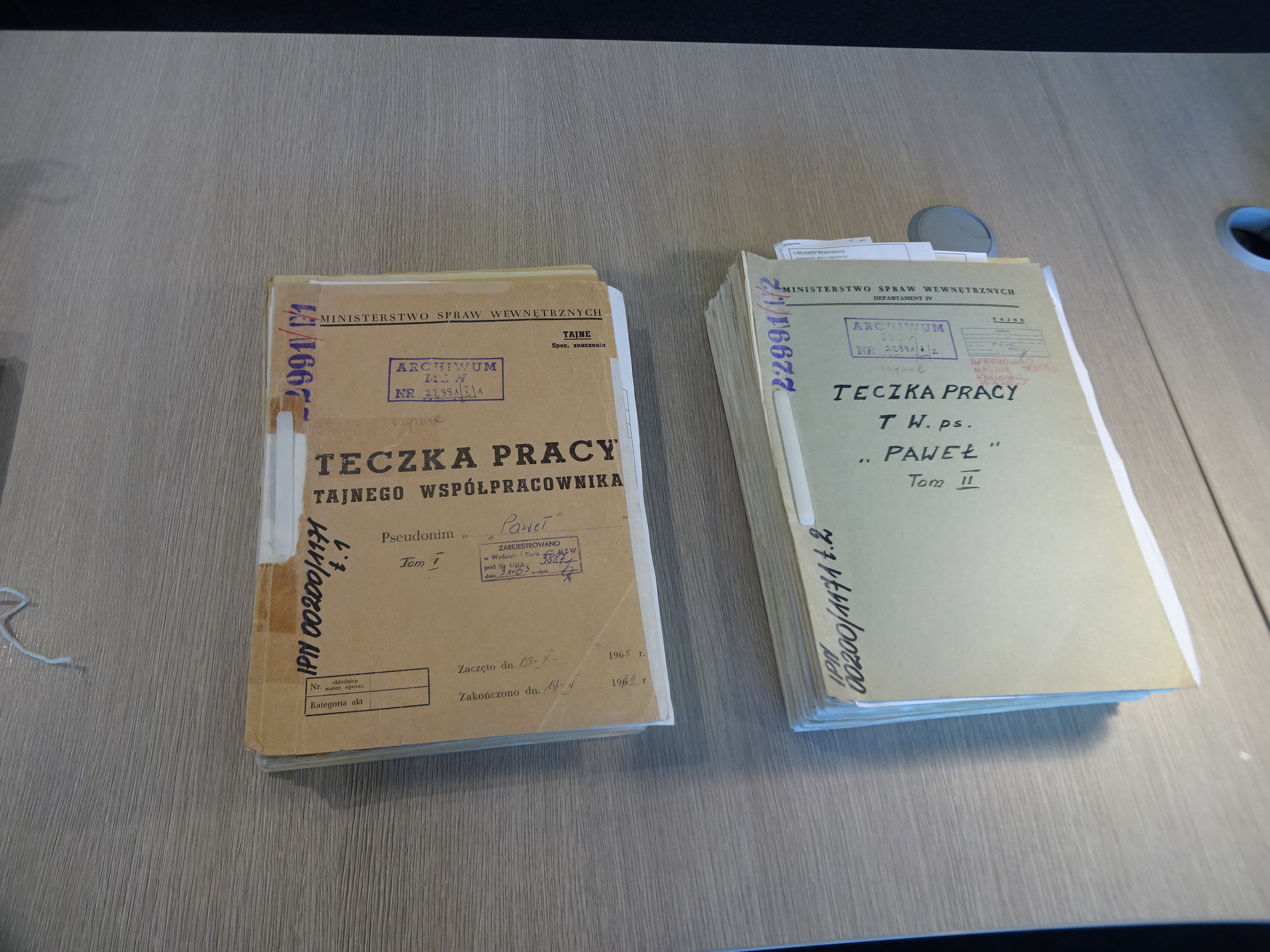
Secret collaborator Paweł

The Security Service took a keen interest in Billy Graham's visit, codenaming the operation Evangelist. The Institute of National Remembrance archives contain nearly 2,000 pages of documents on this event, declassified on 13 July 2013. These documents reveal that Polish Baptists and Father Blachnicki were particularly eager for the visit, while the Polish Ecumenical Council showed less enthusiasm. There was a notable division of opinion among Polish Baptists and Lutherans, who preferred that Graham not speak in Catholic churches, contrasting with Graham's mission's desire to do so. From the outset, the Security Service opposed the visit and sought to control Graham's activities, embedding secret collaborators within his entourage. These agents provided detailed reports on internal discussions and activities. In total, 19 secret collaborators from Protestant churches and 8 from the Catholic Church were involved. The translator for Graham, codenamed Paweł, was instructed to alter Graham's message if he spoke against the socialist regime. In Wrocław, the following agents were used: Pawlica, Wik, Jarosław, Marian, Józef, Tadek, Strzelecki, Mak, and Cesia. These collaborators were briefed to engage in discussions with Graham. Security Service agents also suggested that Graham address the issue of nuclear war during his visit to Oświęcim (Auschwitz). However, the American team paid little attention to the agents and their interpretations.

The Security Service orchestrated a campaign to undermine the ecumenical efforts by sending 12 letters to Bishop Herbert Bednorz and Cardinal Stefan Wyszyński, questioning the value of ecumenism. They also organized a campaign of protest calls, purportedly from "faithful" members, to the curiae in Katowice, Kraków, and Poznań.

According to the Institute of National Remembrance's documents, Graham had a meeting with Edward Gierek, during which he conveyed a message from the American president. The Security Service was particularly concerned about the smuggling of Russian Bibles into Poland by the West German mission Licht im Osten during Graham's visit, as well as the smuggling of religious literature from Poland to Czechoslovakia. The visit was also used as an opportunity to sow discord between Protestant and Catholic churches.

== Sermons ==
- October 7: How to Proclaim the Gospel? – Baptist Church Chapel in Warsaw
- October 8: Return to the Father – Baptist Church Chapel in Białystok
- October 9: The Cross, Our Glory – Poznań Cathedral, Roman Catholic Church
- October 10: Healing of the Human Will – Cathedral of St. Mary Magdalene, Polish Catholic Church in Wrocław
- October 11: Spiritual Awakening – Baptist Church Chapel in Wrocław
- October 11: The Cross as the Signpost to Salvation – Cathedral of Christ the King in Katowice, Roman Catholic Church
- October 12: The Rich Young Ruler – Church of St. Anne in Kraków, Roman Catholic Church
- October 14: At the Foot of the Cross of Calvary – All Saints Church in Warsaw, Roman Catholic Church
- October 15: The Price of a Human Soul – Evangelical Reformed Church in Warsaw
- October 15: The Return of the Prodigal Son – Holy Trinity Church in Warsaw, Evangelical-Augsburg Church

== See also ==
- List of Billy Graham's crusades
- Los Angeles Crusade (1949)
- New York Crusade (1957)

== Bibliography ==
- Batóg, Włodzimierz; Glass, William (2019). "Mosty wzajemnego zrozumienia. Wizyta Billy'ego Grahama w Polsce w październiku 1978 roku – przebieg i skutki" (PDF). Dzieje Najnowsze (in Polish). 3. ISSN 0419-8824.
- Graham, Billy (2010). Taki, jaki jestem (in Polish). Translated by Marcol, J. THEOLOGOS. ISBN 978-83-927002-5-8.
- Gryniakow, Jerzy (1981). "Kaznodziejstwo Billy Grahama". Rocznik Teologiczny (in Polish). XXIII (I). Warsaw: CHAT.
- Seweryn, Andrzej (2006). Na drodze dialogu. Zaangażowanie ekumeniczne Kościoła Baptystycznego jako członka Polskiej Rady Ekumenicznej w latach 1945–1989 (in Polish). Vol. I. Warsaw: Wydawnictwo Uczelniane Wyższego Baptystycznego Seminarium Teologicznego w Warszawie. ISBN 83-88-49710-3.
- Stankiewicz, Michał, ed. (1979). Billy Graham w Polsce (in Polish). Warsaw: Słowo Prawdy.
- Wiazowski, Konstanty (2008). "Billy Graham w Polsce". Słowo Prawdy (in Polish). 9.
