= List of Billy Graham's crusades =

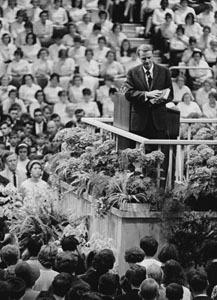
Graham at his crusade (1966).

Billy Graham's crusades were evangelistic campaigns conducted by Billy Graham between 1947 and 2005.

== History ==
The first Billy Graham evangelistic campaign, held September 13–21, 1947, in the Civic Auditorium in Grand Rapids, Michigan, was attended by 6,000 people. He would rent a large venue, such as a stadium, park, or street. As the sessions became larger, he arranged a group of up to 5,000 people to sing in a choir. He would preach the gospel and invite people to come forward to ask Jesus "to be their savior" and pray together. The inquirers were often given a copy of the Gospel of John or a Bible study booklet. In Durban, South Africa, in 1973, the crowd of some 100,000 was the first large mixed-race event in apartheid South Africa. In Moscow, in 1992, one-quarter of the 155,000 people in Graham's audience went forward at his call.

In 1995, during the Global Mission event, he preached a sermon at Estadio Hiram Bithorn in San Juan in Puerto Rico which was transmitted by satellite in 185 countries and translated into 116 languages.

During his crusades, Billy Graham frequently used the altar call song "Just As I Am".

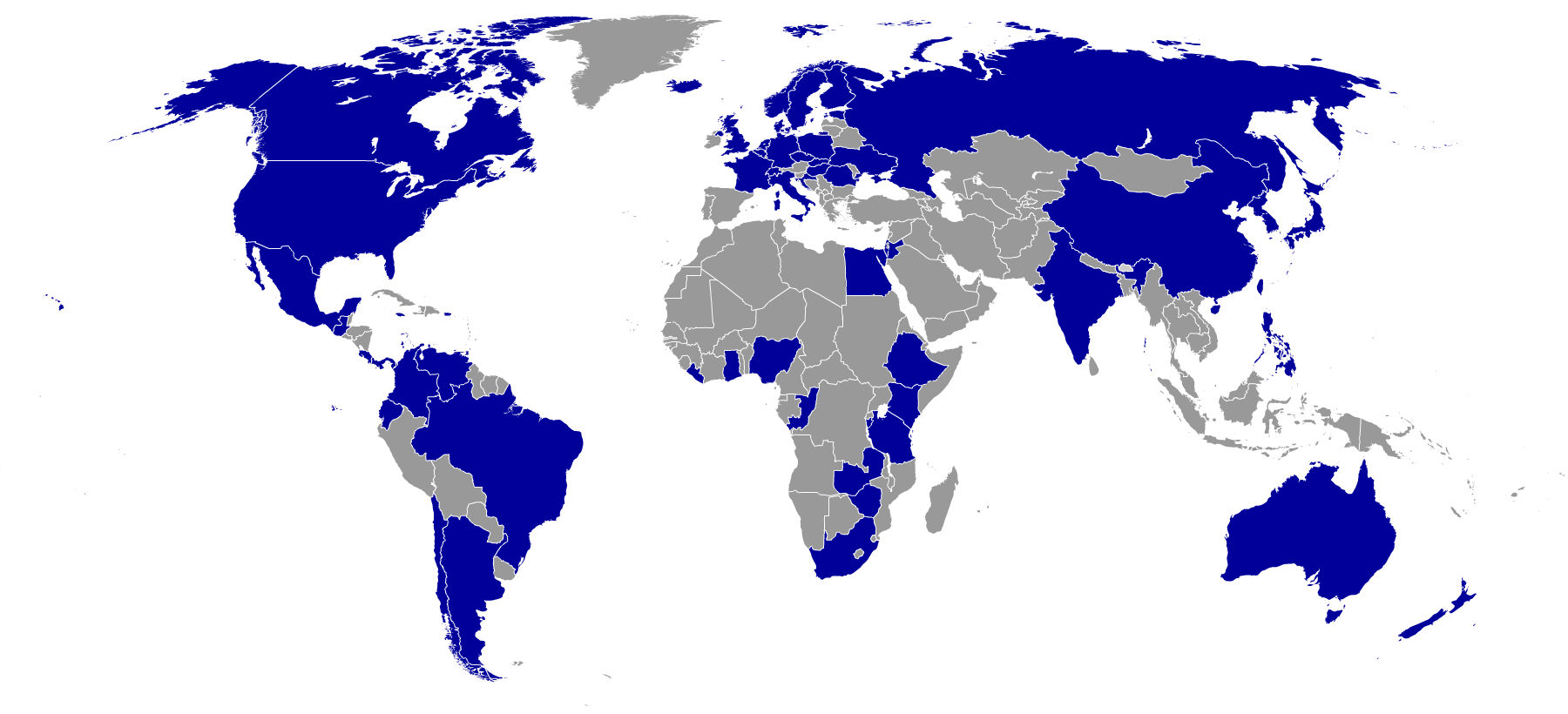
Countries in which Billy Graham preached are colored in blue.

Over 58 years, Billy Graham reached more than 210 million people (face to face and by satellite feeds). The New York Crusade of 1957 - the longest of Graham's evangelistic crusades took place in Madison Square Garden, which lasted 16 weeks. The largest audience in the history of Graham's ministry assembled at Yoido Plaza in Seoul in South Korea in 1973 (1.1 million people).

Graham's revival meetings were most commonly called "crusades", and were billed as such for decades, but Graham himself began calling them "missions" after the September 11 attacks due to a potentially offensive connotation of the word crusade among Muslims.

Concluding his last crusade in 2005 in New York, Graham had preached during 417 crusades, including 226 in the United States and 195 worldwide in over 50 countries, predominantly in Christendom.

== Chronological list ==
| Number | Date | City | Country |
|---|---|---|---|
1947
| 1 | September 13–21 | Grand Rapids | United States |
| 2 | November 9–23 | Charlotte | United States |
1948
| 3 | | Augusta | United States |
| 4 | | Modesto | United States |
1949
| 5 | | Miami | United States |
| 6 | | Baltimore | United States |
| 7 | | Altoona | United States |
| 8 LA Crusade | September 25 – November 20 | Los Angeles | United States |
1950
| 9 | | Boston | United States |
| 10 | | Columbia | United States |
| 11 tour | | states of New England | United States |
| 12 | | Portland | United States |
| 13 | | Minneapolis | United States |
| 14 | | Atlanta | United States |
| | December 30, 31 | Boston | United States |
1951
| 15 tour | | South States | United States |
| 16 | | Fort Worth | United States |
| 17 | | Shreveport | United States |
| 18 | | Cincinnati | United States |
| 19 | | Memphis | United States |
| 20 | | Seattle | United States |
| 21 | | Hollywood | United States |
| 22 | | Greensboro | United States |
| 23 | | Raleigh | United States |
1952
| 24 | January 13 – February 10 | Washington, D.C. | United States |
| 25 tour | April–May | American cities | United States |
| 26 | | Houston | United States |
| 27 | | Jackson | United States |
| 28 tour | August | American cities | United States |
| 29 | | Pittsburgh | United States |
| 30 | | Albuquerque | United States |
1953
| 31 tour | | cities of Florida | United States |
| 32 | | Chattanooga | United States |
| 33 | | St. Louis | United States |
| 34 | | Dallas | United States |
| 35 tour | | West Texas | United States |
| 36 | | Syracuse | United States |
| 37 | | Detroit | United States |
| 38 | | Asheville | United States |
1954
| 39 London Crusade | March 1 – May 29 | London | England |
| 40 tour | | Amsterdam, Berlin, Copenhagen, Düsseldorf, Frankfurt, Helsinki, Paris, Stockholm | Netherlands, West Germany, Denmark, Finland, France, Sweden |
| 41 | | Nashville | United States |
| 42 | | New Orleans | United States |
| 43 tour | | West Coast | United States |
1955
| 44 | March–April | Glasgow | Scotland |
| 45 tour | | Cities of Scotland | Scotland |
| 46 | May | London | England |
| 47 | | Paris | France |
| 48 | | Zürich | Switzerland |
| 49 | | Geneva | Switzerland |
| 50 | | Mannheim | West Germany |
| 51 | | Stuttgart | West Germany |
| 52 | | Nuremberg | West Germany |
| 53 | | Dortmund | West Germany |
| 54 | | Frankfurt | West Germany |
| 55 | | American bases in Germany | West Germany |
| 56 | | Rotterdam | Netherlands |
| 57 | | Oslo | Norway |
| 58 | | Gothenburg | Sweden |
| 59 | | Aarhus | Denmark |
| 60 | | Toronto | Canada |
1956
| 61 | | tour | India and Far East |
| 62 | | Richmond | United States |
| 63 | | Oklahoma City | United States |
| 64 | | Louisville | United States |
1957
| 65 NY Crusade | May 15 – September 1 | New York | United States |
1958
| 66 | | tour | Region of Caribbean Sea |
| 67 | | San Francisco | United States |
| 68 | | Sacramento | United States |
| 69 | | Fresno | United States |
| 71 | | Santa Barbara | United States |
| 72 | | Los Angeles | United States |
| 73 | | San Diego | United States |
| 74 | | San Antonio | United States |
| 75 | September 21 – October 26 | Charlotte | United States |
1959
| 76 | February 15 – March 15 | Melbourne | Australia |
| 77 | March 29 – April 4 | Auckland | New Zealand |
| 78 | April 12 – May 10 | Sydney | Australia |
| 79 | May 15–22 | Perth | Australia |
| 80 | May 17–31 | Brisbane | Australia |
| 81 | | Adelaide | Australia |
| 82 | March 30 – April 6 | Wellington | New Zealand |
| 83 | April 1–8 | Christchurch | New Zealand |
| 84 | | Canberra | Australia |
| 85 | | Launceston | Australia |
| 86 | | Hobart | Australia |
| 87 | | Little Rock | United States |
| 88 | | Wheaton | United States |
| 89 | | Indianapolis | United States |
1960
| 90 | | Monrovia | Liberia |
| 91 | | Accra | Ghana |
| 92 | | Kumasi | Ghana |
| 93 | | Lagos | Nigeria |
| 94 | | Ibadan | Nigeria |
| 95 | | Kaduna | Nigeria |
| 96 | | Enugu | Nigeria |
| 97 | | Jos | Nigeria |
| 98 | | Brazzaville | Congo |
| 99 | | Bulawayo | Southern Rhodesia |
| 100 | | Salisbury | Southern Rhodesia |
| 101 | | Kitwe | Northern Rhodesia |
| 102 | | Moshi | Tanganyika |
| 103 | | Kisumu | Kenya |
| 104 | | Usumbura | Ruanda-Urundi |
| 105 | | Nairobi | Kenya |
| 106 | | Addis Abeba | Ethiopia |
| 107 | | Cairo | Egypt |
| 108 | | Jerusalem | Jordan |
| 109 | | Washington, D.C. | United States |
| 110 | | Rio de Janeiro | Brazil |
| 111 | | Bern | Switzerland |
| 112 | | Zürich | Switzerland |
| 113 | | Basel | Switzerland |
| 114 | | Lausanne | Switzerland |
| 115 | | Essen | West Germany |
| 116 | | Hamburg | West Germany |
| 117 | | Berlin | West Germany |
| 118 | | New York (for Spanish Americans) | United States |
1961
| 119 | | Jacksonville | United States |
| 120 | | Orlando | United States |
| 121 | | Clearwater | United States |
| 122 | | St. Petersburg | United States |
| 123 | | Tampa | United States |
| 124 | | Bradenton–Sarasota | United States |
| 125 | | Tallahassee | United States |
| 126 | | Gainesville | United States |
| 127 | | Miami | United States |
| 128 | | Cape Canaveral | United States |
| 129 | | West Palm Beach | United States |
| 130 | | Peace River | United States |
| 131 | | Boca Raton | United States |
| 132 | | Fort Lauderdale | United States |
| 133 | | Manchester | England |
| 134 | | Glasgow | Scotland |
| 135 | | Belfast | Northern Ireland |
| 136 | | Minneapolis | United States |
| 137 | | Philadelphia | United States |
1962
| 138 | January – February | tour | South America |
| 139 | | Raleigh | United States |
| 140 | | Jacksonville | United States |
| 141 | | Chicago | United States |
| 142 | | Seattle | United States |
| 143 | | Fresno | United States |
| 144 | | Redstone Arsenal | United States |
| 145 tour | September – October | Southern States | United States |
| 146 | | El Paso | United States |
1963
| 147 | May 12–26 | Paris | France |
| 148 | | Lyon | France |
| 149 | | Toulouse | France |
| 150 | | Mulhouse | France |
| 151 | | Montauban | France |
| 152 | | Nancy | France |
| 153 | | Douai | France |
| 154 | | Nuremberg | West Germany |
| 155 | | Stuttgart | West Germany |
| 156 | | Los Angeles | United States |
1964
| 157 | | Birmingham | United States |
| 158 | | Phoenix | United States |
| 159 | | San Diego | United States |
| 160 | | Columbus | United States |
| 161 | | Omaha | United States |
| 162 | September | Boston | United States |
| 163 | October | Boston | United States |
| 164 | | Manchester | United States |
| 165 | | Portland | United States |
| 166 | | Bangor | United States |
| 167 | | Providence | United States |
| 168 | | Louisville | United States |
1965
| 169 | | Honolulu, O'ahu | United States |
| 168 | | Kahului, Maui | United States |
| 169 | | Hilo | United States |
| 170 | | Lihue, Kauaʻi | United States |
| 171 | | Dothan | United States |
| 172 | | Tuscaloosa | United States |
| 173 | | Auburn University (Alabama) | United States |
| 174 | | Tuskegee Institute (Alabama) | United States |
| 175 | | Montgomery | United States |
| 176 | | Copenhagen | Denmark |
| 177 | | Vancouver | Canada |
| 178 | | Seattle | United States |
| 179 | | Denver | United States |
| 180 | | Houston | United States |
1966
| 181 | | Greenville | United States |
| 182 | June | London | England |
| 183 | | Berlin | West Germany |
1967
| 184 | | Ponce | Puerto Rico |
| 185 | | San Juan | Puerto Rico |
| 186 | | Winnipeg | Canada |
| 187 | June | London | England |
| 188 | | Turin | Italy |
| 189 | July 7 | Zagreb | Yugoslavia |
| 190 | | Toronto | Canada |
| 191 | | Kansas City | United States |
| 192 | | Tokyo | Japan |
1968
| 193 | | Brisbane | Australia |
| 194 | | Sydney | Australia |
| 195 | | Portland | United States |
| 196 | | San Antonio | United States |
| 197 | | Pittsburgh | United States |
1969
| 198 | | Auckland | New Zealand |
| 199 | | Dunedin | New Zealand |
| 200 | | Melbourne | Australia |
| 201 | | New York | United States |
| 202 | | Anaheim | United States |
1970
| 203 | | Dortmund | West Germany |
| 204 | May 28 | Knoxville | United States |
| 205 | | New York | United States |
| 206 | October 21–25 | Baton Rouge (Tiger Stadium, Louisiana State University) | United States |
1971
| 207 | | Lexington | United States |
| 208 | | Chicago | United States |
| 209 | | Oakland | United States |
| 210 | September 17–26 | Dallas | United States |
1972
| 211 | | Charlotte | United States |
| 212 | May | Birmingham | United States |
| 213 | July 14–23 | Cleveland | United States |
| 214 | | Kohima | India |
1973
| 215 | | Durban | South Africa |
| 216 | | Johannesburg | South Africa |
| 217 | | Seoul | South Korea |
| 218 | | Atlanta | United States |
| 219 | | Minneapolis | United States |
| 220 | | Raleigh | United States |
| 221 | | St. Louis | United States |
1974
| 222 | | Phoenix | United States |
| 223 | | Los Angeles | United States |
| 224 | | Rio de Janeiro | Brazil |
| 225 | | Norfolk, Hampton | United States |
1975
| 226 | | Albuquerque | United States |
| 227 | May 11, Mother's Day | Jackson | United States |
| 228 | | Brussels | Belgium |
| 229 | | Lubbock | United States |
| 230 | | Taipei | Taiwan |
| 231 | | Hong Kong | British Hong Kong |
1976
| 232 | May 9–16 | Seattle | United States |
| 233 | | Williamsburg | United States |
| 235 | August 13–21 | San Diego | United States |
| 236 | October 14–24 | Pontiac | United States |
1977
| 237 | | Gothenburg | Sweden |
| 238 | | Asheville | United States |
| 239 | | South Bend | United States |
| 240 | | tour | Hungary |
| 241 | | Cincinnati | United States |
| 242 | | Manila | Philippines |
| 243 | | India-Good News Festivals | India |
1978
| 244 | | Las Vegas | United States |
| 245 | | Memphis | United States |
| 246 | | Toronto | Canada |
| 247 | | Kansas City | United States |
| 248 | | Oslo | Norway |
| 249 | | Stockholm | Sweden |
| 250 | | Satellite crusade | Sweden |
| 251 | | Satellite crusade | Norway |
| 252 | | Satellite crusade | Island |
| 253 | October 6–16 | tour | Poland |
| 254 | | Singapore | Singapore |
1979
| 255 | | São Paulo | Brazil |
| 256 | | Tampa | United States |
| 257 | 29 April – 20 May | Sydney | Australia |
| 258 | | Nashville | United States |
| 259 | August 11 | Milwaukee | United States |
| 260 | | Halifax | Canada |
1980
| 261 | | Oxford | England |
| 262 | | Cambridge | England |
| 263 | | Indianapolis | United States |
| 264 | | Edmonton | Canada |
| 265 | | Wheaton | United States |
| 266 | | Okinawa | Japan |
| 267 | | Osaka | Japan |
| 268 | | Fukuoka | Japan |
| 269 | | Tokyo | Japan |
| 270 | | Reno | United States |
| 271 | | Las Vegas | United States |
1981
| 272 | | Mexico City | Mexico |
| 273 | | Villahermosa | Mexico |
| 274 | | Boca Raton | United States |
| 275 | | Baltimore | United States |
| 276 | | Calgary | Canada |
| 277 | | San José | United States |
| 278 | | Houston | United States |
1982
| 279 | | Blackpool | England |
| 280 | | Providence | United States |
| 281 | | Burlington | United States |
| 282 | | Portland | United States |
| 283 | | Springfield | United States |
| 284 | | Manchester | United States |
| 285 | May 10–14 | Moscow | Soviet Union |
| 286 | | Hartford | United States |
| 287 | | New Haven | United States |
| 288 | | Boston (Northeastern University) | United States |
| 289 | | Amherst (University of Massachusetts) | United States |
| 290 | | New Haven (Yale University) | United States |
| 291 | | Cambridge (Harvard University) | United States |
| 292 | | Newton (Boston College) | United States |
| 293 | | Cambridge (Massachusetts Institute of Technology) | United States |
| 294 | | South Hamilton (Gordon-Convell Seminary) | United States |
| 295 | | Hanover (Dartmouth College) | United States |
| 296 | | Boston | United States |
| 297 | | New Orleans (South Baptist Convention Evangelistic Rally) | United States |
| 298 | | Boise | United States |
| 299 | | Spokane | United States |
| 300 | | Chapel Hill | United States |
| 301 | | Wittenberg | East Germany |
| 302 | | Dresden | East Germany |
| 303 | | Görlitz | East Germany |
| 304 | | Stendal | East Germany |
| 305 | | Stralsund | East Germany |
| 306 | | Berlin | East Germany |
| 307 | | Prague | Czechoslovakia |
| 308 | | Brno | Czechoslovakia |
| 309 | | Bratislava | Czechoslovakia |
| 310 | | Nassau | Bahamas |
1983
| 311 | | Orlando | United States |
| 312 | | Tacoma | United States |
| 313 | | Sacramento | United States |
| 314 | | Oklahoma City | United States |
1984
| 315 | | Anchorage | United States |
| 316 | May 12–19 | Bristol | England |
| 317 | May 26 – June 2 | Sunderland | England |
| 318 | June 9–12 | Norwich | England |
| 319 | June | Birmingham | England |
| 320 | July | Liverpool | England |
| 321 | July | Ipswich | England |
| 322 | | Seoul | South Korea |
| 323 | | Leningrad | Soviet Union |
| 324 | | Tallinn | Soviet Union |
| 325 | | Novosibirsk | Soviet Union |
| 326 | | Moscow | Soviet Union |
| 327 | | Vancouver | Canada |
1985
| 328 | | Fort Lauderdale | United States |
| 329 | | Hartford | United States |
| 330 | June 22–29 | Sheffield | England |
| 331 | July 19–28 | Anaheim | United States |
| 332 | | Suceava | Romania |
| 333 | | Cluj-Napoca | Romania |
| 334 | | Oradea | Romania |
| 335 | | Arad | Romania |
| 336 | | Timișoara | Romania |
| 337 | | Sibiu | Romania |
| 338 | | Bucharest | Romania |
| 339 | | Pécs | Hungary |
| 340 | | Budapest | Hungary |
1986
| 341 | | Washington, D.C. | United States |
| 342 | | Paris | France |
| 343 | | Tallahassee | United States |
1987
| 344 | | Columbia | United States |
| 345 | | Cheyenne | United States |
| 346 | | Fargo | United States |
| 347 | | Billings | United States |
| 348 | | Sioux Falls | United States |
| 349 | July | Denver | United States |
| 350 | | Helsinki | Finland |
1988
| 351 | | Beijing | China |
| 352 | | Huai'an | China |
| 353 | | Nanjing | China |
| 354 | | Shanghai | China |
| 355 | | Guangzhou | China |
| 356 | | Zagorsk | Soviet Union |
| 357 | | Moscow | Soviet Union |
| 358 | | Kyiv | Soviet Union |
| 359 | | Buffalo | United States |
| 360 | | Rochester | United States |
| 361 | | Hamilton | Canada |
1989
| 362 | | Syracuse | United States |
| 363 | | London | England |
| 364 | | Budapest | Hungary |
| 365 | | Little Rock | United States |
1990
| 368 | | Berlin | West Germany |
| 369 | | Montreal | Canada |
| 370 | | Albany | United States |
| 371 | | Uniondale | United States |
| 372 | | Hong Kong | British Hong Kong |
1991
| 373 | | Seattle, Tacoma | United States |
| 374 | | Edinburgh | Scotland |
| 375 | | Aberdeen | Scotland |
| 376 | | Glasgow | Scotland |
| 377 | | East Rutherford | United States |
| 378 | | New York (Central Park) | United States |
| 379 | | Buenos Aires | Argentina |
1992
| 380 | | Pyongyang | North Korea |
| 381 | June | Philadelphia | United States |
| 382 | | Portland | United States |
| 383 | | Moscow | Russia |
1993
| 384 | March 17–21 | Essen | Germany |
| 385 | June 2-6 | Pittsburgh | United States |
| 386 | | Columbus | United States |
1994
| 387 | | Tokyo | Japan |
| 388 | | Beijing | China |
| 389 | | Pyongyang | North Korea |
| 390 | | Cleveland | United States |
| 391 | | Atlanta | United States |
1995
| 392 | | San Juan | Puerto Rico |
| 393 | | | Global mission |
| 394 | | Toronto | Canada |
| 395 | | Sacramento | United States |
1996
| 396 | | | World Television Series |
| 397 | | Minneapolis | United States |
| 398 | | Charlotte | United States |
1997
| 399 | | San Antonio | United States |
| 400 | | San Jose | United States |
| 401 | | San Francisco | United States |
| 402 | | Oakland | United States |
1998
| 403 | June 25–28 | Ottawa | Canada |
| 404 | | Tampa | United States |
1999
| 405 | | Indianapolis | United States |
| 406 | | St. Louis | United States |
2000
| 407 | June 1–4 | Nashville | United States |
| 408 | | Jacksonville | United States |
2001
| 409 | | Louisville | United States |
| 410 | | Fresno | United States |
2002
| 411 | | Cincinnati | United States |
| 412 | | Dallas | United States |
2003
| 413 | | San Diego | United States |
| 414 | | Oklahoma City | United States |
2004
| 415 | | Kansas City | United States |
| 416 | | Los Angeles | United States |
2005
| 417 | | New York | United States |

== See also ==
- Billy Graham Evangelistic Association

== Bibliography ==
- "BG Crusade Chronology" (PDF). BGEA.
- "BG Crusade cities". BGEA.
- "Select Chronology of Billy Graham and the Billy Graham Evangelistic Association, up until Rev. Graham's Retirement in 2005, with a few later significant events". Billy Graham Center. Wheaton College. 2013.
- "Billy Graham's 1st TV Broadcast". Billy Graham Center. March 2010.
- Billy Graham sermons Billy Graham Center
