= Spring Lake, North Carolina =

- Town
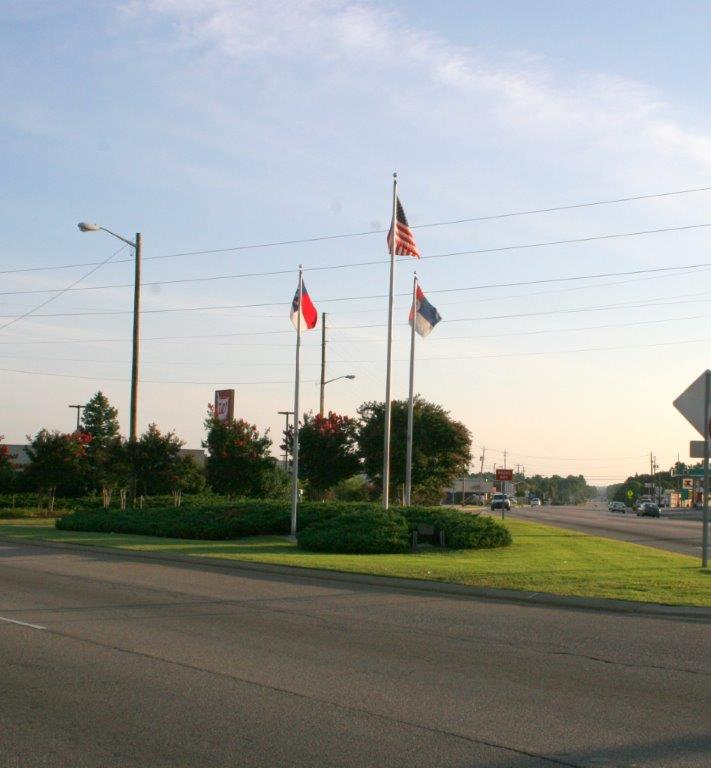
- Intersection with North Bragg Boulevard and Lillington Highway in Spring Lake

- Flag Seal
- Motto: "Unity for Prosperity"
- Location in Cumberland County and the state of North Carolina.
- Coordinates: 35°11′04″N 78°59′46″W
- Country: United States
- State: North Carolina
- County: Cumberland

Government
  - Type: Council-Manager
  - Current mayor: Kia Anthony
  - First mayor: Grady Howard

Area
  - Total: 23.84 sq mi (61.74 km^{2})
  - Land: 23.62 sq mi (61.18 km^{2})
  - Water: 0.22 sq mi (0.56 km^{2})
- Elevation: 171 ft (52 m)

Population (2020)
  - Total: 11,660
  - Density: 494/sq mi (190.6/km^{2})
- Time zone: UTC-5 (Eastern (EST))
  - Summer (DST): UTC-4 (EDT)
- ZIP code: 28390
- Area codes: 910, 472
- FIPS code: 37-64180
- GNIS feature ID: 2407386
- Website: www.townofspringlake.com

Spring Lake is a town in Cumberland County, North Carolina, United States. As of the 2020 census, Spring Lake had a population of 11,660.

== History ==
The current name of the town first appeared around 1923 for a spring fed lake, which probably formed when the railroad was built about 1860. The community grew slowly until World War II. At its incorporation, the town selected the post office on Main Street as the center of town. The town limits extended only 0.8 miles (1.3 km) from its center, but increased rapidly as nearby Fort Bragg was built up. Today, Spring Lake remains a quaint town with its close ties to nearby Fort Bragg.

Previously, the area was called "Clayton Cut", due to the pathway cut that ran through the area where the railroad later resided, and also "Prince's Siding", after a man named Prince who owned a sawmill on this land.

Spring Lake was officially incorporated on April 9, 1951. Grady Howard was named interim mayor on this date, and was officially elected the first mayor of Spring Lake on June 5, 1951.

The modern growth spurt beginning in World War II is attributed to the proximity of Fort Bragg.

Long Valley Farm was listed on the National Register of Historic Places in 1994.

== Geography ==
Spring Lake is located in northwestern Cumberland County. It is bordered to the south by the city of Fayetteville, the Cumberland County seat, to the west by Hoke and Moore counties, and to the north by Harnett County. Large portions of the town limits are occupied by Pope Air Force Base and parts of Fort Bragg.

North Carolina Highways 87 and 24 run concurrently through the town, leading south 11 miles (18 km) to downtown Fayetteville. NC 87 leads north 26 miles (42 km) to Sanford, while NC 24 runs northwest 31 miles (50 km) to Carthage. North Carolina Highway 210 leads northeast 18 miles (29 km) to Lillington and southeast as Murchison Road 10 miles (16 km) to downtown Fayetteville.

According to the United States Census Bureau, the town of Spring Lake has a total area of 23.2 square miles (60.2 km^{2}), of which 23.1 square miles (59.7 km^{2}) is land and 0.19 square miles (0.5 km^{2}), or 0.88%, is water. The Little River, a tributary of the Cape Fear River, runs the length of the town from west to east, passing north of the town center.

It includes sections of the Fort Bragg property, including Pope Field.

== Demographics ==
Historical population
Census	Pop.	Note	%±
1960	4,110		—
1970	3,968		−3.5%
1980	6,273		58.1%
1990	7,524		19.9%
2000	8,098		7.6%
2010	11,964		47.7%
2020	11,660		−2.5%
2025 (est.)	11,252	▼	−3.5%
U.S. Decennial Census

=== Racial and ethnic composition ===
Spring Lake town, North Carolina – Racial and ethnic composition Note: the US Census treats Hispanic/Latino as an ethnic category. This table excludes Latinos from the racial categories and assigns them to a separate category. Hispanics/Latinos may be of any race.
Race / Ethnicity (NH = Non-Hispanic)	Pop 2000	Pop 2010	Pop 2020	% 2000	% 2010	% 2020
White alone (NH)	2,391	4,889	3,709	29.53%	40.86%	31.81%
Black or African American alone (NH)	4,053	4,131	4,415	50.05%	34.53%	37.86%
Native American or Alaska Native alone (NH)	60	111	78	0.74%	0.93%	0.67%
Asian alone (NH)	286	335	384	3.53%	2.80%	3.29%
Native Hawaiian or Pacific Islander alone (NH)	29	47	103	0.36%	0.39%	0.88%
Other Race alone (NH)	22	34	98	0.27%	0.28%	0.84%
Mixed race or Multiracial (NH)	294	578	800	3.63%	4.83%	6.86%
Hispanic or Latino (any race)	963	1,839	2,073	11.89%	15.37%	17.78%
Total	8,098	11,964	11,660	100.00%	100.00%	100.00%

=== 2020 census ===
As of the 2020 census, Spring Lake had a population of 11,660. The median age was 26.5 years. 26.9% of residents were under the age of 18 and 7.6% of residents were 65 years of age or older. For every 100 females there were 99.5 males, and for every 100 females age 18 and over there were 99.7 males age 18 and over.

97.8% of residents lived in urban areas, while 2.2% lived in rural areas.

There were 4,541 households in Spring Lake, including 2,653 families. Of all households, 35.9% had children under the age of 18 living in them, 38.8% were married-couple households, 23.6% were households with a male householder and no spouse or partner present, and 31.9% were households with a female householder and no spouse or partner present. About 29.9% of all households were made up of individuals, and 6.7% had someone living alone who was 65 years of age or older.

There were 5,359 housing units, of which 15.3% were vacant. The homeowner vacancy rate was 3.3% and the rental vacancy rate was 11.8%.

=== 2010 census ===
As of the census of 2010, there were 11,964 people, 4,202 households, and 2,880 families residing in the town. The population density was 517.9 inhabitants per square mile (200.0/km^{2}). There were 4,855 housing units at an average density of 210.2 units per square mile (81.3/km^{2}). The racial makeup of the town was 47.2% White, 36.3% African American, 1.1% Native American, 3.0% Asian, 0.5% Pacific Islander, 5.1% some other race, and 6.9% from two or more races. Hispanic or Latino of any race were 15.4% of the population.

There were 4,202 households, out of which 46.2% had children under the age of 18 living with them, 44.7% were headed by married couples living together, 18.8% had a female householder with no husband present, and 31.5% were non-families. 25.5% of all households were made up of individuals, and 4.0% were someone living alone who was 65 years of age or older. The average household size was 2.65, and the average family size was 3.21.

In the town, the population was spread out, with 31.2% under the age of 18, 19.3% from 18 to 24, 31.8% from 25 to 44, 13.0% from 45 to 64, and 4.8% who were 65 years of age or older. The median age was 24.9 years. For every 100 females, there were 104.0 males. For every 100 females age 18 and over, there were 106.2 males.

=== Income and poverty ===
For the period 2009–13, the estimated median annual income for a household in the town was $36,538, and the median income for a family was $38,243. Male full-time workers had a median income of $34,921 versus $29,473 for females. The per capita income for the town was $15,852. About 19.5% of families and 23.2% of the population were below the poverty line, including 28.7% of those under age 18 and 21.1% of those age 65 or over.

== Law and government ==
In May 2009, Spring Lake's police department was stripped of its authority, with the Cumberland County Sheriff's Office assuming command in the town. This happened after two of its senior officers were arrested on an array of charges including embezzlement, larceny, obstruction of justice, second-degree kidnapping, and breaking and entering. The District Attorney dropped the majority of misdemeanor cases the department had investigated, saying "We can no longer rely upon the basic presumed integrity of the work product of this department." Chief of Police A.C. Brown resigned in the aftermath of the scandal. The town has since revamped the department with the hiring of new officers and a new police chief, Dysoaneik Spellman. The power to investigate misdemeanors was restored in 2010.

Spring Lake is served by a mayor and town board. Members are elected for two year renewable terms. The current board consists of mayor Kia Anthony and aldermen Marvin Lackman, Raul Palacios as well as alderwomen Adrian Jones Thompson, Sona Cooper and mayor pro-tem Robyn Chadwick.

The next municipal election in Spring Lake will be in November 2023.

== Education ==
The Cumberland County Schools district serves most areas for grades PK-12. The Department of Defense Education Activity (DoDEA) operates public schools on Fort Bragg for PK-8, but for high school Fort Bragg students attend local public schools in their respective counties.

== Notable people ==
- Jim Carter, professional golfer and 1983 NCAA champion
- Vanessa Grubbs, nephrologist and a writer
- Harold Landry, NFL linebacker
- Marvin W. Lucas, politician, retired principal
- Chris Watts, convicted murderer
