= Grady Wilson =

Grady Wilson may refer to:

- Grady Wilson (Sanford and Son), fictional character
- Demond Wilson, stage name of actor Grady Wilson
- Grady B. Wilson, American evangelist
- Grady Wilson (baseball)
