= Graddy =

Graddy is a surname. Notable people with the name include:

- Kathryn Graddy, economics professor and dean
- Sam Graddy (born 1964), American sprinter and football player

== See also ==
- Grady (surname)
