= Billy Graham's crusades in France =

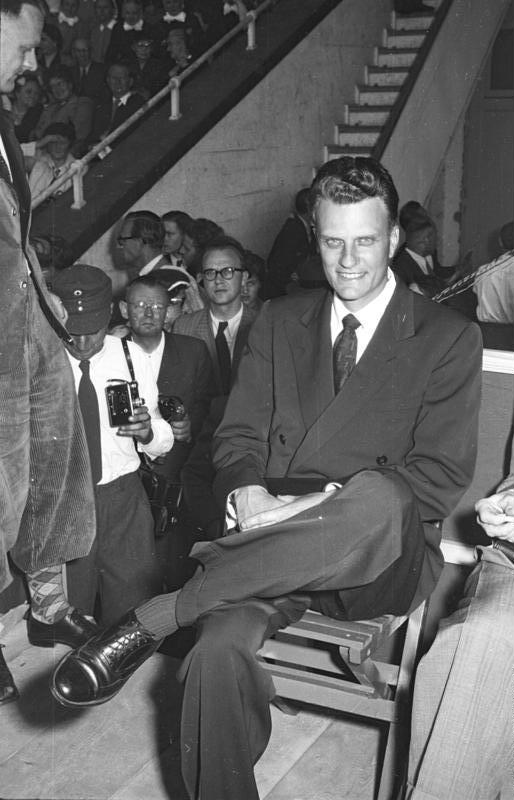
Billy Graham in 1954

Billy Graham's crusades in France were evangelistic campaigns conducted by American evangelist Billy Graham in France. France was one of the Western European countries he visited most frequently. The first campaign took place in 1955, followed by others in 1963 and 1986. During his last visit, more than one hundred thousand people gathered. He was referred to as both a "charming preacher" and a "fundamentalist export" and was compared to Pope John Paul II.

== American Protestantism and France ==
American Protestantism has shown an interest in France since the early 19th century. The country appeared to American evangelists as a major mission field. Adoniram Judson, one of the first Baptist activists in France, stated in 1832 that an evangelized France would influence all intellectual classes in Europe. In America, converting France was seen as defeating atheism on its own turf. After World War II, American President Dwight D. Eisenhower and other US politicians during the Cold War were interested in converting France from atheism. For them, this was more of a political than a religious goal, as atheism was perceived in the US as a first step toward communism. In the eyes of American politicians, turning France away from atheism meant turning it away from an attraction to communism.

Billy Graham's mission was to reach non-believers. France, as one of the largest and most secularized countries in Western Europe, became one of the American evangelist's primary targets on the European continent.

== Graham's crusades ==
Billy Graham first visited France in 1954 during a brief stopover on his European tour, following a crusade in London. As part of the European tour, he visited Glasgow, Helsinki, Stockholm, Copenhagen, Amsterdam, Frankfurt, Düsseldorf, Berlin, and Paris. On 30 June, he arrived in Paris but did not hold any open meetings. Instead, he met with 2,700 French-speaking pastors and Protestant leaders from France, Belgium, and Switzerland at Palais de Chaillot.

In the following year, he held his first major evangelistic campaign in France, which took place from 5 to 9 June at the Vélodrome d'Hiver sports hall. It garnered media attention.

From 12 to 26 May 1963, Graham conducted another campaign, this time visiting a different city each day: Montauban, Douai, Paris, Nancy, Toulouse, Lyon, and Mulhouse. The campaign attracted an estimated 60,000 attendees.

His largest campaign took place in 1986, from 20 to 27 September. Preparations began in 1983, and over 100,000 people attended the event. Additionally, around 200,000 more gathered across 31 locations in France to watch the American evangelist via satellite broadcasts. During this visit, Billy Graham met with President François Mitterrand.

In addition to these, Graham's global crusade in 1995, which was transmitted via satellite, can also be counted among his crusades in France.

In his autobiography Just as I Am, Graham gives little attention to France, which may suggest that the country did not play a central role in his missionary plans. However, French historian Sébastien Fath, a specialist in evangelical Protestantism, argues that France played a more significant role than Graham's biography suggests.

== Reception ==
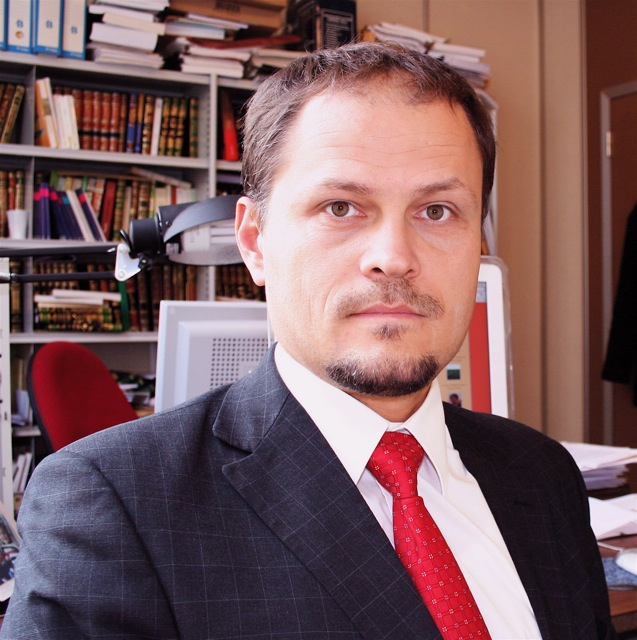
Sébastien Fath, a specialist in the history of evangelical Protestantism in France and author of several works on Graham

In 1954, French journalist Marcel Cheminade referred to Graham as a true American idol, even more popular than Rudolph Valentino or Frank Sinatra. Henri Fesquet, writing for Le Monde in 1955, praised Graham for his "spirit of adaptation" and commended French Protestants for inviting him to France.

André Wurmser, writing for the communist L'Humanité before Graham's first crusade in France, criticized it as a foreign endeavor with a political agenda. He claimed that Graham, a successor to P. T. Barnum, manipulated people's emotions to ensure safety for American capitalists, and suggested that the inspiration for the crusades came from Senator Joseph McCarthy.

The most critical evaluation came from French writer and philosopher Roland Barthes in 1957. Barthes accused Graham of preaching a version of God that had nothing to do with Thomism, arguing that throughout the history of Western Christianity, both Catholicism and Protestantism had relied heavily on Aristotelianism. Graham, according to Barthes, rejected this tradition in favor of the magic of words and musical accompaniment. He argued that Graham's sermons lacked persuasion and instead used suggestion, with three main phases: expectation, suggestion, and initiation. Barthes also critiqued Graham for simplifying theological statements to tautologies, such as "God is God", and claimed that if God truly spoke through Graham, then God would be foolish. Barthes believed Graham's campaigns in France were partially a result of the McCarthy era in the US and were encouraged by President Eisenhower.

French Protestants generally viewed Graham's crusades positively, although there were some critical voices within the evangelical community, accusing him of excessive ecumenism. Catholic responses were generally favorable, especially from figures like historian Daniel Rops. However, in 1963, some Catholic voices expressed concern, suggesting that Catholics should not participate in Graham's crusades.

In 1986, reactions were much warmer, with Graham being referred to as the "evangelical pope" and compared to Pope John Paul II. The centrist newspaper France-Soir on 22 September 1986 rated him as one of the greatest preachers of the contemporary world, alongside John Paul II. However, the centrist-left Le Monde gave the 1986 campaign a more critical review. Journalist Henri Tincq advised Graham to "go back to America and forget about your plans for France".

Sébastien Fath pointed out that in 1945, evangelical Protestants in France numbered around 50,000, but by 60 years later, this figure had risen to 400,000. He attributed much of this growth to Graham's efforts. Fath argued that Graham's crusades revealed that the Catholic Church was no longer an adversary to evangelical Christianity, and that the traditional divide between Catholicism and Protestantism no longer existed. He attributed the critical responses to Graham to cultural anti-Americanism, which was particularly strong in Scandinavian countries.

== See also ==
- List of Billy Graham's crusades
- Protestantism in France
