= Thomas Grady =

Thomas Grady may refer to:

- Thomas Grady (VC) (1835–1891), Irish recipient of the Victoria Cross
- Thomas Joseph Grady (1914–2002), American prelate of the Roman Catholic Church
- Tom Grady (born 1958), member of the Florida House of Representatives
- Thomas Eugene Grady (1880–1974), justice of the Washington Supreme Court
- Thomas F. Grady (1853–1912), New York politician
- Thomas Grady (politician) (born 1939), member of the Nevada Assembly
- Tommy Grady (Thomas Grady), arena football quarterback
- Tom Grady, a character in the film The Final Storm

== See also ==
- Grady Thomas, member of the bands Parliament and Funkadelic
