= Grady O'Cummings III =

American politician

Grady O'Cummings III was a declared candidate for president in the United States presidential election of 1964 in both the Democratic primaries and for his self-formed National Civil Rights Party. He later withdrew to challenge Democratic representative John J. Rooney in New York's 14th congressional district. In 1969, he faked his own death to avoid threats to him and his family from the Black Panther Party. O'Cummings died in 1996 at the age of 63.
