= Grądy =

Grądy may refer to the following places:

- Grądy, Sieradz County in Łódź Voivodeship (central Poland)
- Grądy, Łomża County in Podlaskie Voivodeship (north-east Poland)
- Grądy, Mońki County in Podlaskie Voivodeship (north-east Poland)
- Grądy, Wieruszów County in Łódź Voivodeship (central Poland)
- Grądy, Lublin Voivodeship (east Poland)
- Grądy, Lesser Poland Voivodeship (south Poland)
- Grądy, Gmina Jaktorów, Grodzisk County in Masovian Voivodeship (east-central Poland)
- Grądy, Maków County in Masovian Voivodeship (north-central Poland)
- Grądy, Gmina Małkinia Górna in Masovian Voivodeship (east-central Poland)
- Grądy, Gmina Wąsewo in Masovian Voivodeship (east-central Poland)
- Grądy, Sierpc County in Masovian Voivodeship (north-central Poland)
- Grądy, Sokołów County in Masovian Voivodeship (east-central Poland)
- Grądy, Warsaw West County in Masovian Voivodeship (east-central Poland)
- Grądy, Konin County in Greater Poland Voivodeship (central Poland)
- Grądy, Koło County in Greater Poland Voivodeship (central Poland)
- Grądy, Opole Voivodeship (south-west Poland)
- Grądy, Działdowo County in Warmian-Masurian Voivodeship (north Poland)
- Grądy, Pisz County in Warmian-Masurian Voivodeship (north-east Poland)
- Grądy, Szczytno County in Warmian-Masurian Voivodeship (north Poland)
- Grądy, West Pomeranian Voivodeship (north-west Poland)
