= Cathedral of Christ the King, Katowice =

Catholic cathedral in Katowice, Poland

Coordinates: 50°15′05″N 19°01′07″E

Archcathedral of Christ the King in Katowice
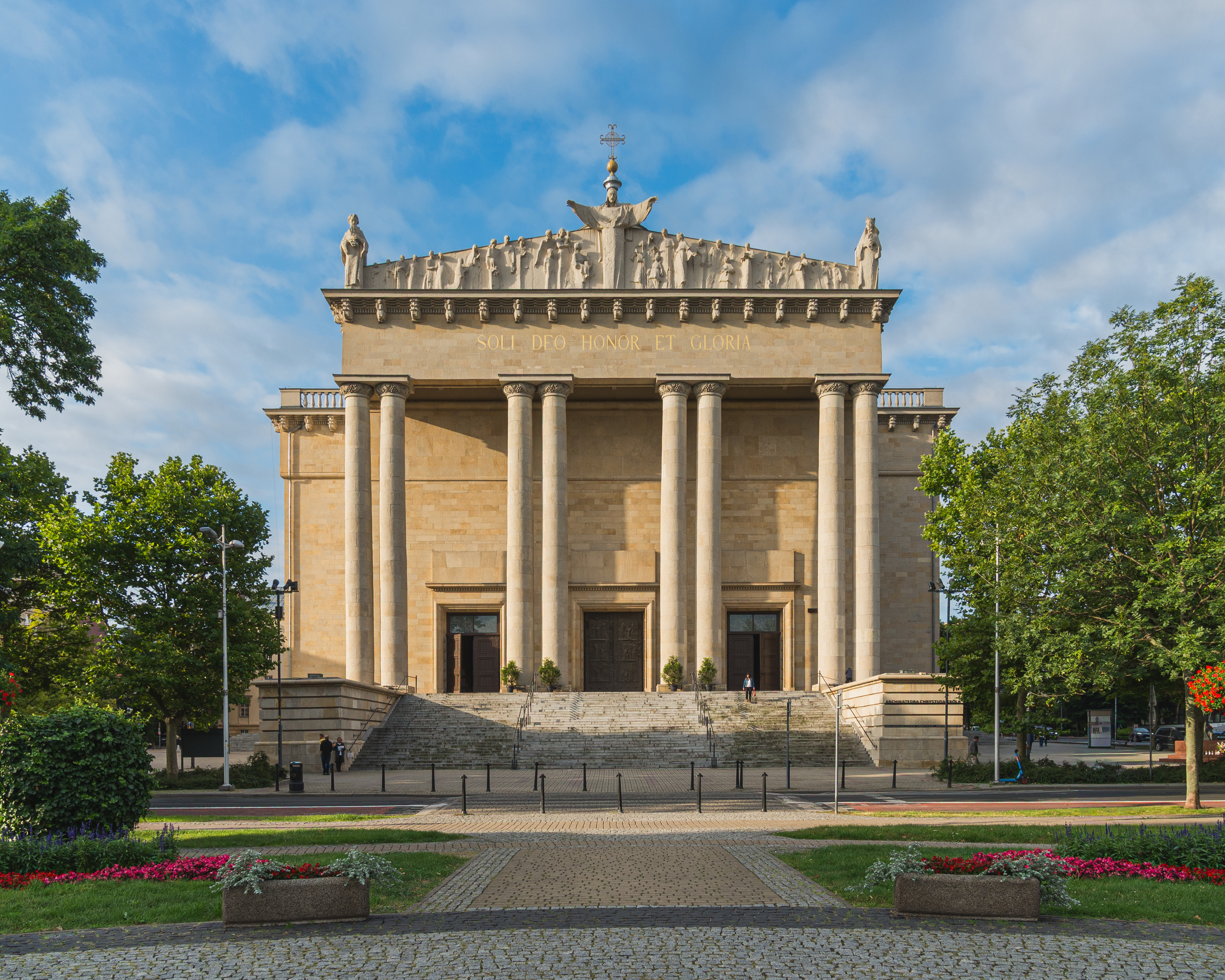

Religion
- Affiliation: Roman Catholic

Location
- Location: Katowice, Poland
- Interactive map of Archcathedral of Christ the King in Katowice

Archikatedra Chrystusa Króla w Katowicach (English: Archcathedral of Christ the King in Katowice) is a classicist and modernist archcathedral in Katowice-Śródmieście, Katowice, Poland. Constructed between 1927 and 1955, the Archcathedral of Christ the King is the largest archcathedral and cathedral in Poland, 120,000 metres cubed large.

Construction began in the inter-war period and was funded by the autonomous Silesian Parliament (located within the Second Polish Republic). In the year 1983 the archcathedral was visited by Pope John Paul II. The throne he sat on is on display in the chapel devoted to him within the archcathedral.

The archcathedral is faced in stone but constructed from brick.

The building is well known for the high quality of its acoustics.

== Gallery ==
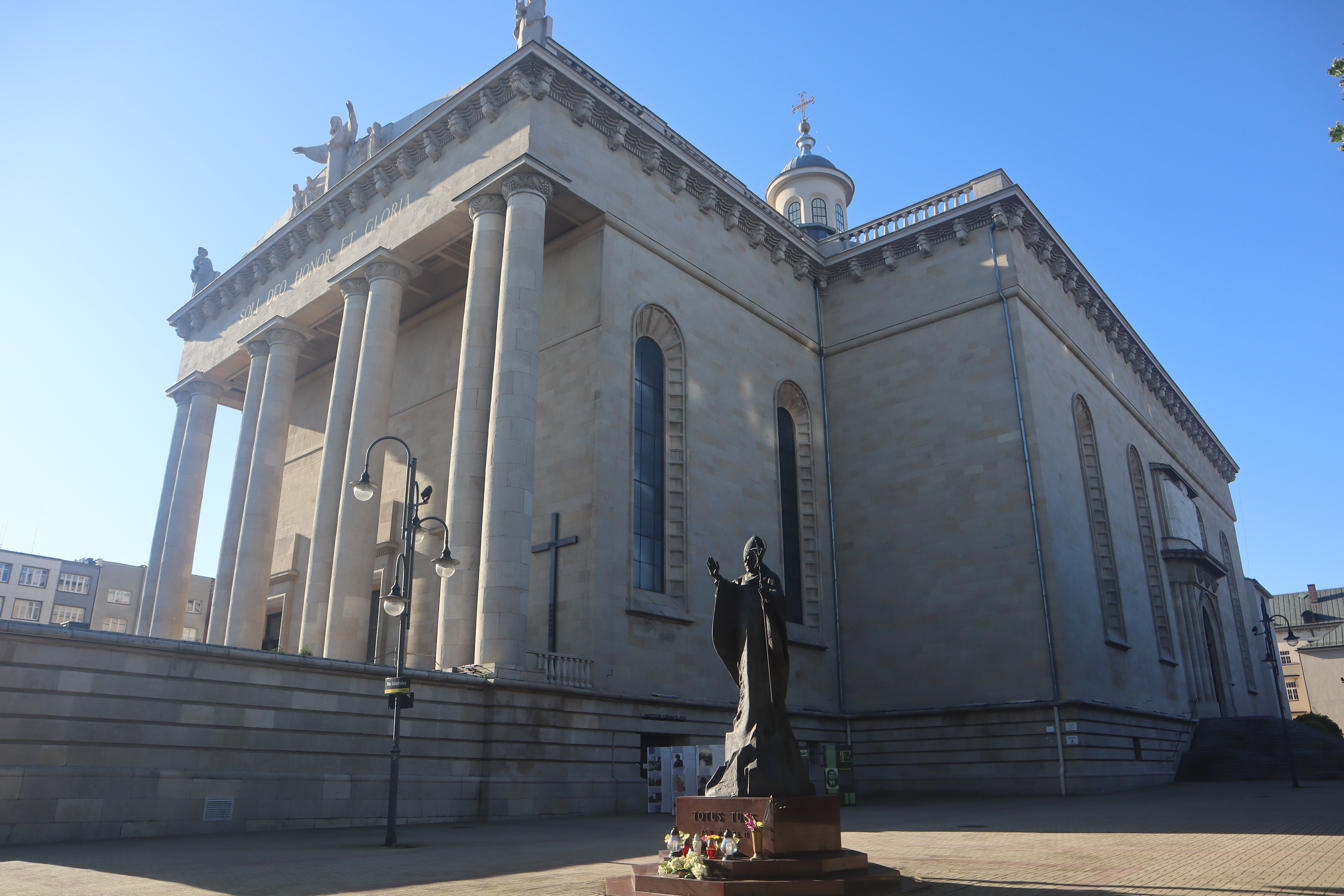

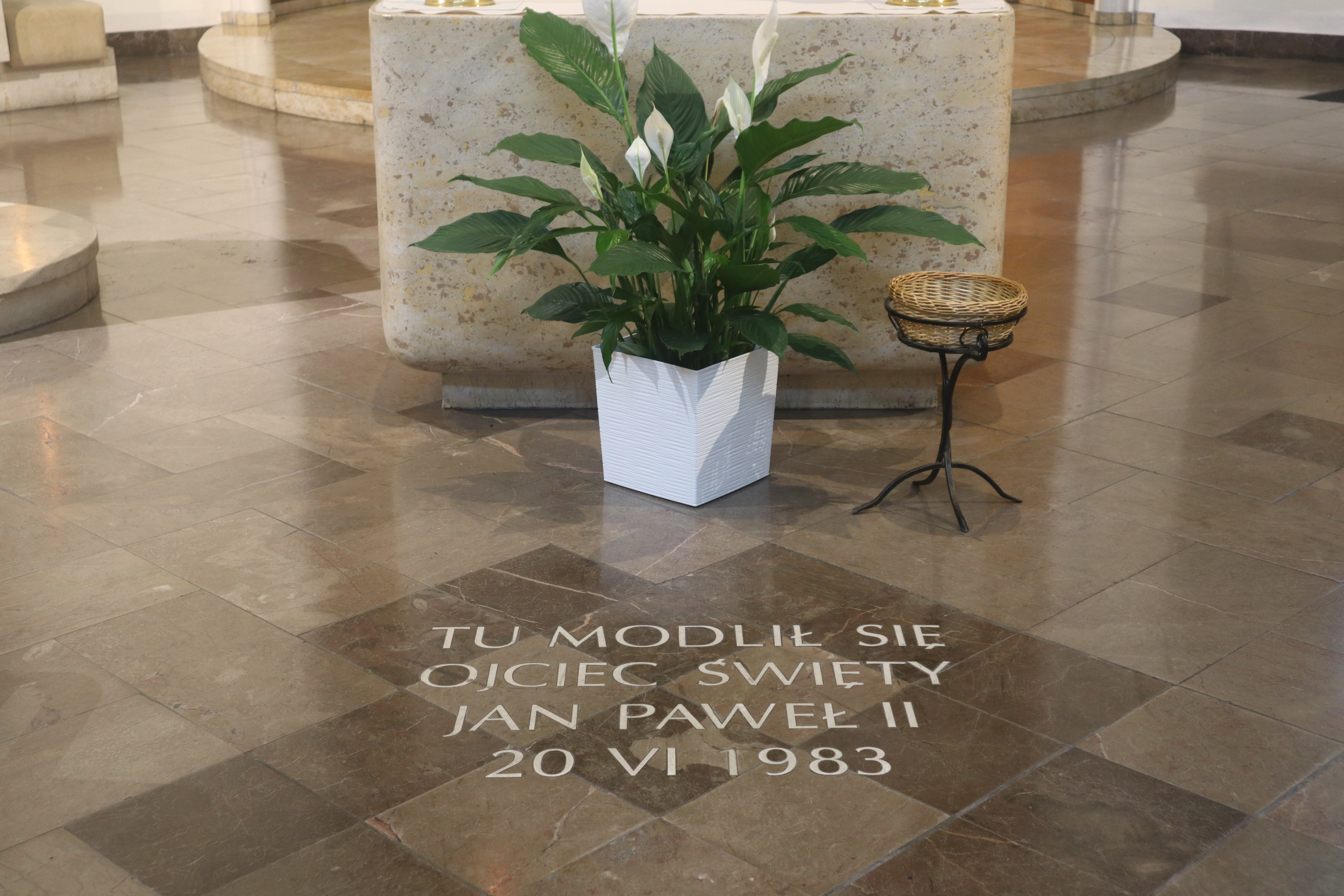

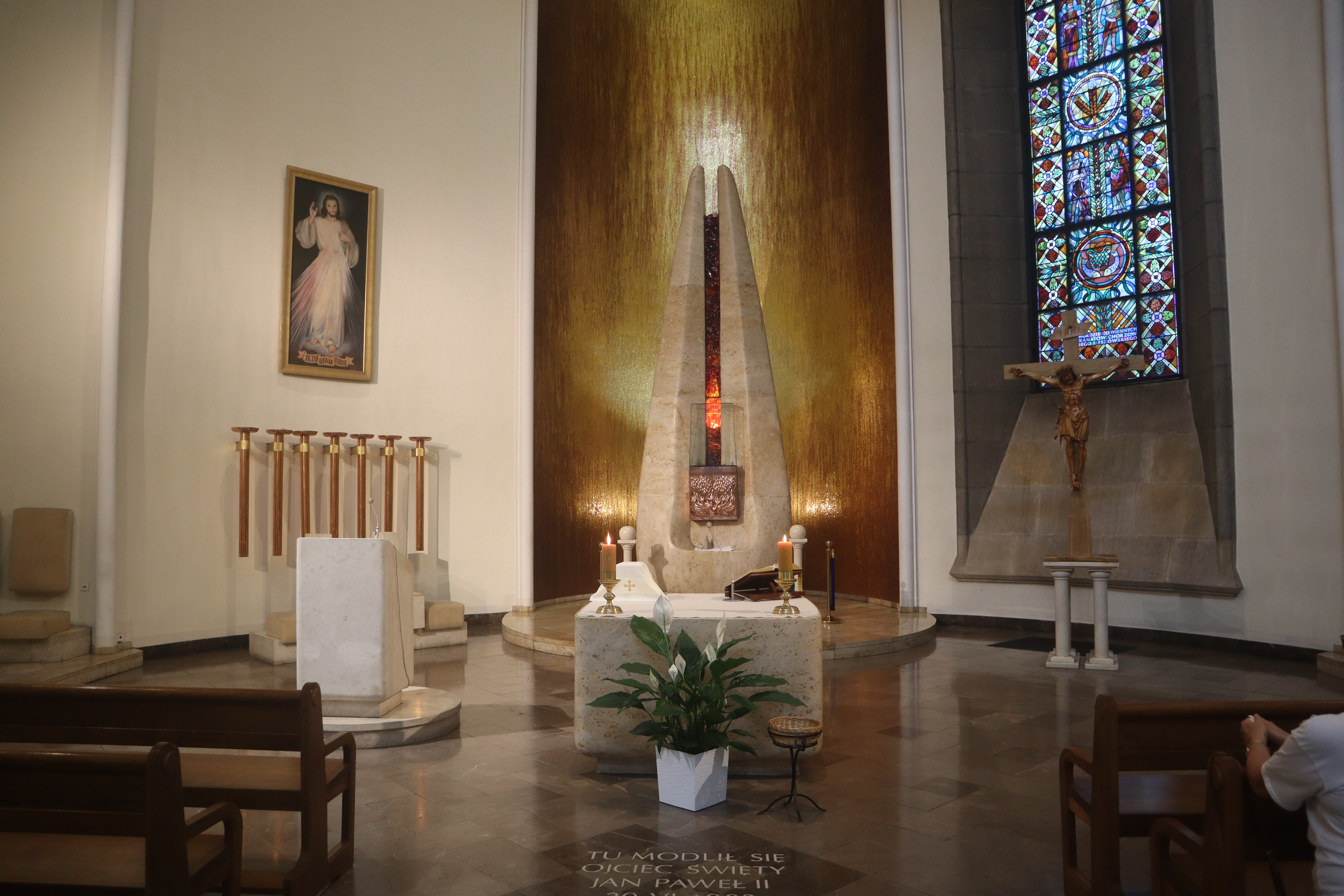

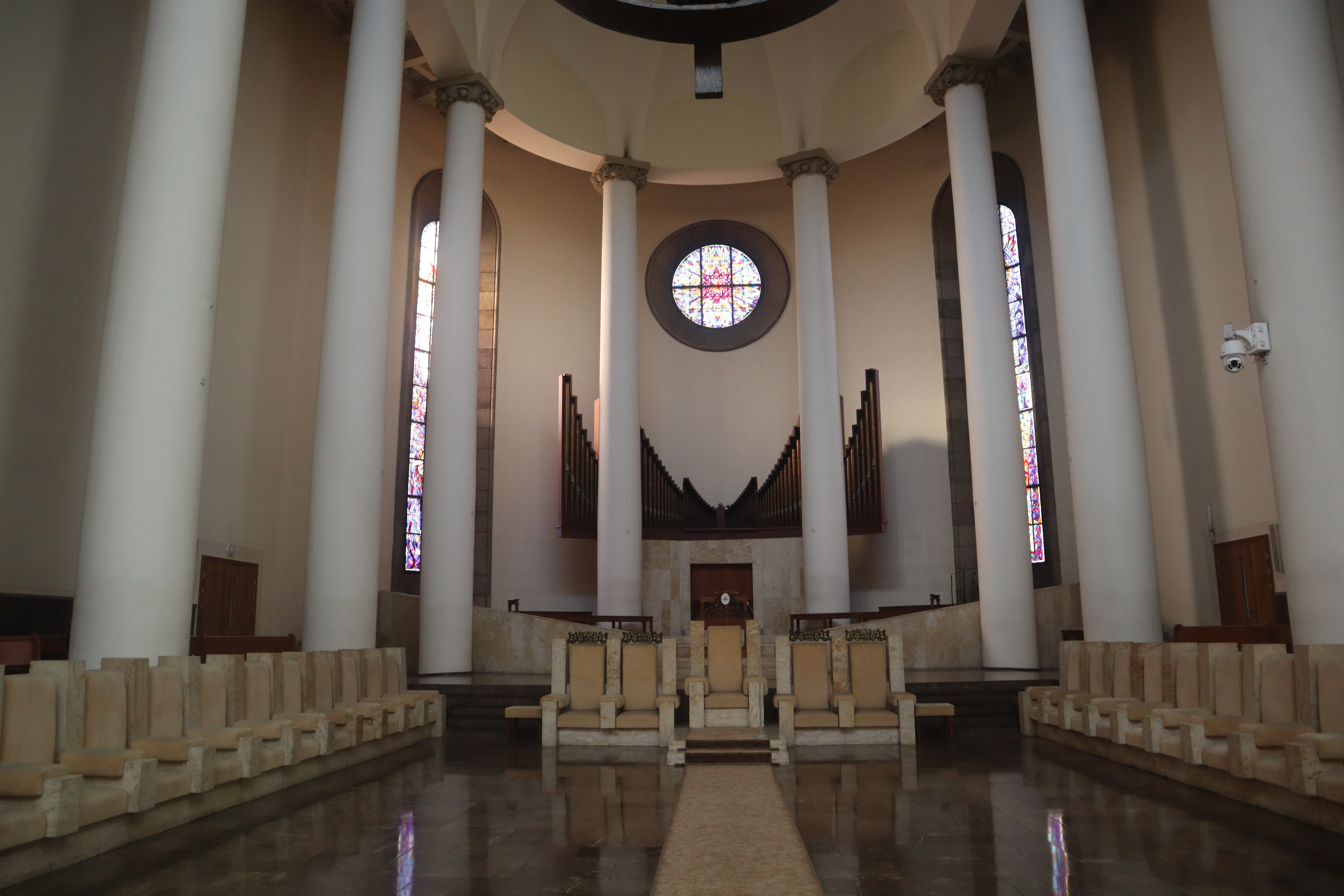
