= Robert Grady =

Robert Grady may refer to:

- W. Robert Grady (born 1950), American member of the North Carolina General Assembly
- Robert E. Grady (born 1957), American venture capitalist and investment banker
- Robert B. Grady (1943–2014), software development engineer
