= Mike Grady =

Mike Grady may refer to:

- Mike Grady (actor) (born 1946), British character actor
- Mike Grady (baseball) (1869–1943), American baseball catcher
