= W. Mack Grady =

American engineer

W. Mack Grady is an American engineer who currently serves as a Professor of Electrical & Computer Engineering at Baylor University. He is also the Josey Centennial Professor Emeritus in Energy Resources at the Cockrell School of Engineering, University of Texas at Austin. Additionally, Grady is a fellow of the Institute of Electrical and Electronics Engineers.
