= Sandy Grady =

American sportswriter

Sandy Grady (c. 1928 – April 14, 2015) - Charlotte, NC, was a sportswriter who wrote for the Philadelphia Daily News and the Philadelphia Bulletin. He covered the Philadelphia Phillies. Grady also spent time with the Charlotte News and USA Today. His death came soon after that of another Philadelphia sportswriter, Stan Hochman. He is mentioned many times in the book The Phillies Reader. He was also featured on C-SPAN. He was a recipient of the A.J. Liebling Award.

He died April 14, 2015, at age 87 in Reston, Virginia.
