= Henri Tincq =

French journalist (1945–2020)

- Born: 2 November 1945; Fouquières-lès-Lens, France
- Died: 29 March 2020 (aged 74); Villeneuve-Saint-Georges, France
- Occupation: Journalist

Henri Tincq (2 November 1945 – 29 March 2020) was a French journalist and Vatican expert.

He was a religious specialist for the newspaper Le Monde from 1985 to 2008 after having worked for the newspaper La Croix. He also worked for the magazine Slate.

== Biography ==
Tincq obtained a degree in philosophy from Sciences Po in Paris and a degree in journalism from the École supérieure de journalisme de Lille. His most notable work is Larousse des religions, and he chaired the Association des journalistes de l’information religieuse (AJIR) from 1994 to 1999.

Tincq had an interest in the history of popes. Following the election of Pope Benedict XVI in 2005, he established a list of "progressive objectives" for the Catholic Church for Benedict's papacy. He was opposed to the fundamentalist movement, and he was highly critical of Benedict's positions in favor of the movement. Tincq expressed disappointment in the way Benedict leaned towards traditionalism during matters of morality.

Tincq was delighted that Benedict organized a second meeting of major religions, as inter-religious dialogue often turned against traditionalism and skepticism. He was worried about the Islamist risings in North Africa and the fate of Christians in Egypt. He also had great praise for Benedict's speech in front of the German Bundestag.

Tincq was often viewed as more friendly to Protestants, but often hostile to Orthodox Christians.

Tincq died of COVID-19 on 29 March 2020, in Villeneuve-Saint-Georges at the age of 74.

== Awards and honours ==
- Templeton Prize in Journalism (2001)
- Knight of the Legion of Honour

== Publications ==
- L'Église pour la démocratie (1991)
- L'Étoile et la Croix (1993)
- Les Médias et l’Église : évangélisation et information (1997)
- Défis au pape du troisième millénaire : le pontificat de Jean-Paul II, les dossiers du successeur (1997)
- Les Génies du christianisme : histoires de prophètes de pécheurs et de saints (1999)
- Vivre l'islam (2003)
- Une France sans Dieu (2003)
- Larousse des religions (2005)
- Ces papes qui ont fait l'histoire (2006)
- Petit Larousse des religions (2007)
- Les Catholiques (2008)
- Catholicisme : le retour des intégristes (2009)
- Jean-Marie Lustiger : le cardinal prophète (2012)
- La Grande Peur des catholiques de France (2018)
