= Grady Howard =

American politician (1911–1989)

First Mayor of Spring Lake, North Carolina

Personal details
- Born: Grady Howard; September 15, 1911 Greer, South Carolina, U.S.
- Died: April 4, 1989 (aged 77) Spring Lake, North Carolina, U.S.
- Party: Democratic
- Spouse: Elma Walker Howard (1917–2007)

Grady Howard was the first mayor of Spring Lake, North Carolina and a member of the Democratic Party.

== Early life and career ==
Howard was born in Greer, South Carolina, the son of Narsissie "Cissy" and Davis Milford Howard in South Carolina. Grady Howard was elected first democratic mayor of Spring Lake during the town's incorporation in 1951.

In April 1951, Howard was appointed mayor of Spring Lake by the General Assembly following the town's incorporation. He went on to win a special municipal election and continue to serve for 10 years. He served four more years in two later terms.

He served as the first president of the Greater Spring Lake Chamber of Commerce organized in 1962 and for almost 20 years on the Cumberland County Joint Planning Board. He was active in the Spring Lake Lions Club and was a past commander of American Legion Post No. 230 in Spring Lake. He also served as chairman of the Spring Lake Democratic precinct.

Howard held membership in the North Carolina Beekeepers' Association, handling gallberry and gum honey in several farms in Cedar Creek and Harnett County, North Carolina.

He was a member of Cape Fear Valley Hospital's original board of trustees and a member of Highland Baptist Church in Taylors, South Carolina although he attended the First Presbyterian Church in Spring Lake for more than 50 years.

The Grady Howard conference room was dedicated on June 24, 1979 at the new Spring Lake Town Hall.

== Personal life ==
Howard was married to Elma Mattie Walker (1917–2007) from 1941 until his death in 1989. He had one daughter: Dianne, and two granddaughters: Jami and Megan. His granddaughter Jami McLaughlin was elected Mayor Pro Tem in Spring Lake in 2003 and served two terms.

== Notes ==
- Pate, HB. and J Sheppard.(2007) Spring Lake, North Carolina. Arcadia Publishing. ISBN 978-0-7385-1722-3.
