= John Grady =

John Grady may refer to:

- John C. Grady (1847-1916), American lawyer and politician
- John D. Grady (died 1880), American criminal
- John Grady (baseball) (1858–1924), American baseball player
- John Grady (Medal of Honor) (1872–1956), United States Navy officer and Medal of Honor recipient
- John Grady (sociologist) (born 1960s), American sociologist
- John Grady (author) (1923–1986), Australian author and social scientist
- John F. Grady (1929–2019), U.S. federal judge
- John Grady (politician), Scottish politician
