= Henry Grady =

Henry Grady may refer to:

- Henry F. Grady (1882–1957), United States ambassador to India, Greece and Iran
- Henry W. Grady (1850–1889), American journalist and orator
- Henry Deane Grady (1764–1847), member of parliament for Limerick
