= Grady, Virginia =

Unincorporated community in Virginia, US

Coordinates: 36°47′13″N 79°38′14″W

Grady is an unincorporated community in Pittsylvania County, in the U.S. state of Virginia.
