= New York Crusade (1957) =

1957 evangelistic campaign

- Date: May 15 – September 1, 1957
- Duration: 16 weeks
- Location: New York City, United States
- Type: Evangelist revival meeting
- Organized by: Billy Graham
- Participants: ~2.4 million (total)

The New York Crusade was a major evangelistic campaign conducted in 1957 in New York City by Billy Graham. It was preceded by two years of preparation and lasted from May 15 to September 1 (16 weeks). It was the largest evangelistic campaign ever organized in New York City.

In addition to Graham, the gathered audience heard speeches from then-Vice President Richard Nixon and Pastor Martin Luther King, among others. 97 evangelistic meetings took place in the then-current Madison Square Garden arena on Eighth Avenue, with an average attendance of 17,828 people. Additionally, special meetings with Graham were held at the Forest Hills Tennis Stadium, Times Square, Yankee Stadium, and several other locations. The largest gathering occurred at Times Square, with 125,000 attendees.

The Crusade was daily reported on by The New York Times and the New York Herald Tribune. Graham's campaign was criticized by liberal theologians, Protestant fundamentalists, and proponents of racial segregation. The New York evangelistic crusade marked the beginning of televangelism – a new form of religiosity based on media.

== Preparations and costs ==
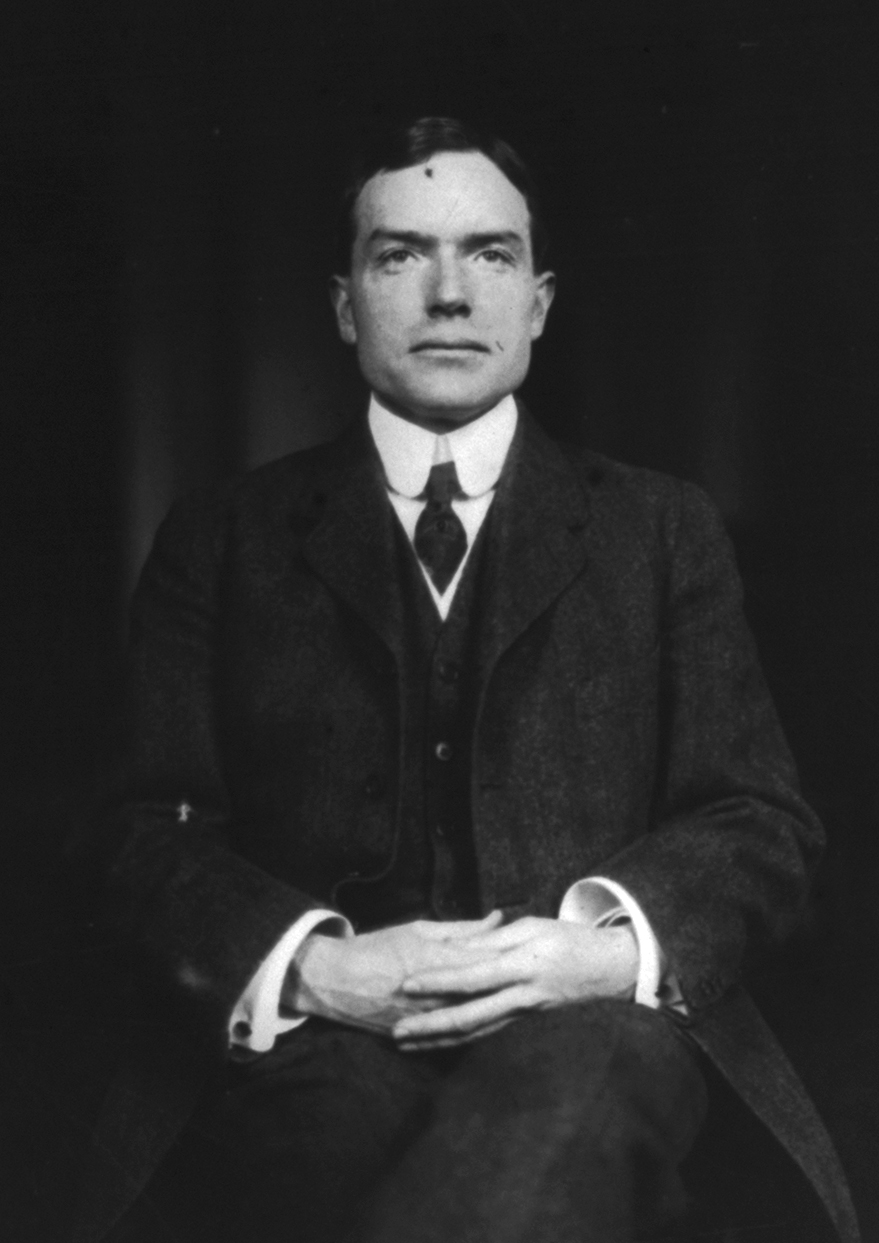
One of the sponsors was John D. Rockefeller Jr.

In 1954, the Protestant Council of New York (Note: The Protestant Council of New York was established in 1815 ("History of the Council". The Council of Churches of the City of New York. 2010. Archived from the original on 2016-10-03.).) invited Graham to conduct an evangelistic crusade. Graham declined but encouraged the inclusion of Protestant churches not affiliated with the council. In the summer of 1955, the council again proposed the idea, and on December 9, a positive decision was made, forming a committee for the crusade. This committee included representatives from non-council churches. Around 1,700 denominations participated, not only from New York but also from Long Island, Westchester, and five New Jersey counties.

A group of twenty volunteers was organized, operating for two years. Fifteen of them belonged to liberal Protestant churches, and five to fundamentalist ones. 250,000 songbooks and 100,000 copies of the Gospel of John were prepared for the evangelistic crusade. A choir of 4,000 people from New York churches was organized, with 2,000 members rotating each evening. (Note: Curtis states it was 1,500 people (Mitchell (1957, p. 55)).) 6,000 volunteers offered to assist during the crusade. Approximately 5,000 prayer groups were organized in the US, and 10,000 in 75 countries, to support the New York Crusade. Additionally, nightly prayer sessions for the crusade's success were held in New York.

In early 1957, Billy Graham Evangelistic Association released a brochure titled Why We Must Go To New York, in which Billy Graham explained that 58% of New York residents did not identify with any religion. Protestants comprised only 7.5%, and many had loose ties to their churches. The goal of the crusade was to attract new believers to the churches and encourage less active Christians to become more engaged.

It was planned that meetings would take place at Madison Square Garden every evening from 7:30 to 9:15 PM. About one-third of the seats were reserved before the crusade began. Most ticket reservations came from New Yorkers, but participants also came from Louisville, Nashville, Detroit, Buffalo, Washington, Philadelphia, and even from cities as far as Oklahoma City.

On May 11, Graham met with President Dwight Eisenhower to finalize organizational matters related to the crusade. The conclusion of the crusade was initially planned for June 30, with the possibility of extension if attendance remained high. It was extended three times; on June 3, the decision was made to extend it to July 20 due to the significant interest in the early weeks. On July 19, it was extended to August 10, and on August 3, it was decided that the last meeting at Madison Square Garden would be on August 31.

At the beginning of 1957, Billy Graham estimated that the cost of the crusade would be $850,000. The New York Times estimated at the outset of the campaign that its total costs would be $1.3 million, not including Graham's evangelistic group's expenses. The actual cost of the crusade was $2.5 million. Sponsors included William Randolph Hearst (Jr.), publisher Henry Luce, aviator Eddie Rickenbacker, and Norman Vincent Peale, one of the most well-known preachers in New York. John D. Rockefeller Jr. sent a check for $50,000. A daily collection was taken; during the first four days, the amounts collected were:

- May 15 – $9,123
- May 16 – $6,600
- May 17 – $7,659
- May 18 – $7,768

== Course of the crusade ==
=== Madison Square Garden ===
The opening ceremony took place on the evening of May 15 at Madison Square Garden. Almost all the seated places were occupied on the first night (19,000). Delegations from 112 Protestant churches attended and occupied about 6,000 seats. Graham's first sermon was published by The New York Times the following day.

The New York Herald Tribune commented daily on the evangelization in a column titled Billy Graham Says. ABC Television agreed to sell its airtime on Saturdays. The first broadcast took place on June 1, attracting over 6 million viewers. It is estimated that around 96 million viewers watched at least one of the fourteen television broadcasts. This marked the beginning of a new type of religiosity, based on media – televangelism.

On July 1, the influential magazine LIFE featured Graham speaking at Madison Garden on its cover. From July 2, all-night prayers for spiritual support were held in ten New York churches. The prayers continued until the end of the crusade.

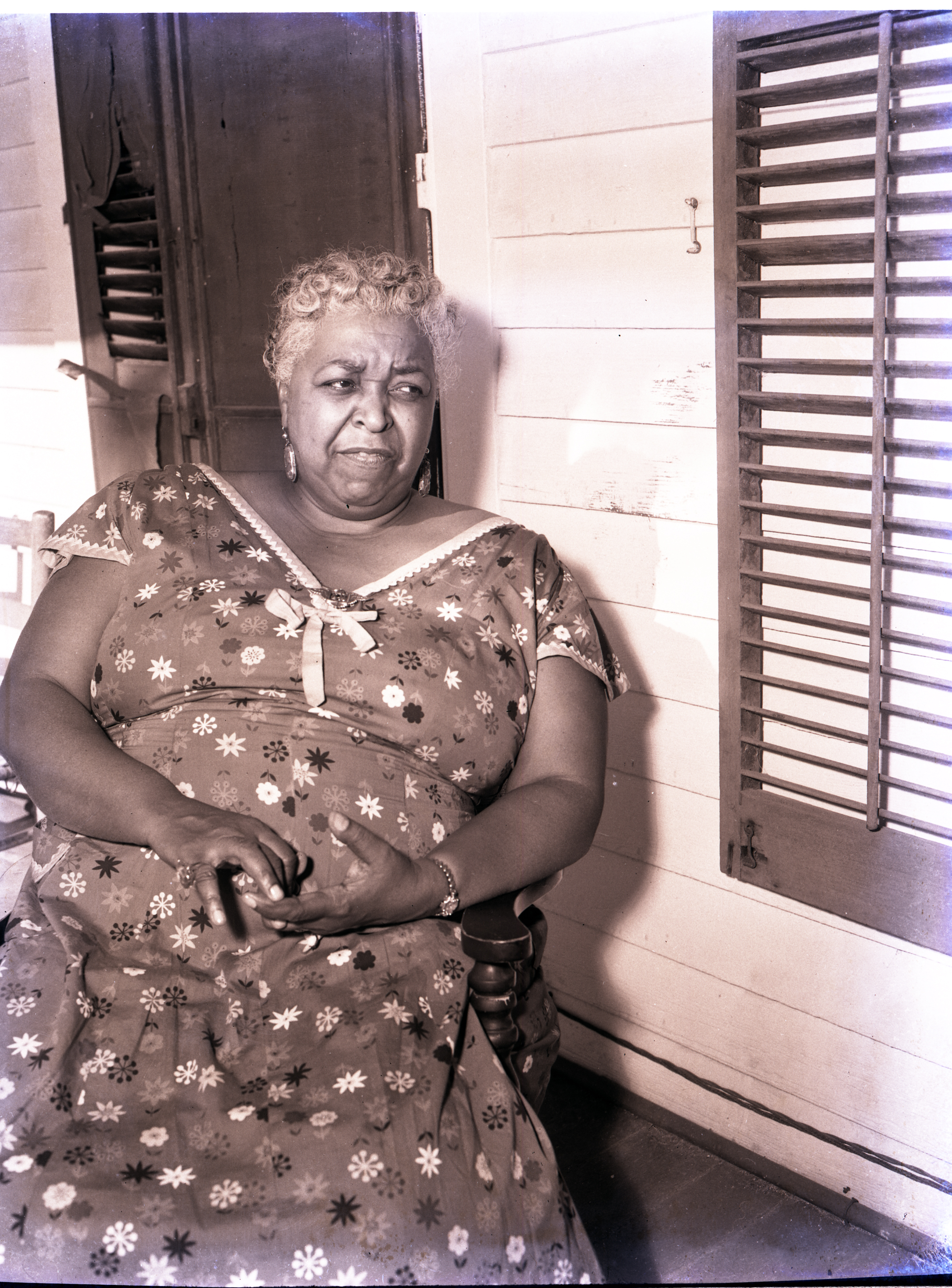
Singing was provided by Ethel Waters

During this crusade, Graham identified communism as the main threat to the world. One of the most famous sermons Graham delivered during this crusade was Is Your Heart Right. It referenced the latest report from the Surgeon General of the United States on heart diseases, which was released that year, but the sermon's content focused on spiritual heart diseases. Graham asked the audience, Is your heart healthy? and urged, You can be healed!, You can have a new heart. Following this sermon, Dr. Carpenter remarked that Graham could address significant cultural phenomena without changing the fundamental message of his sermon.

In addition to Billy Graham, other speakers included Martin Luther King (July 18), Mordecai Ham (May 29), and other preachers and evangelists. Popular American soloists such as George Beverly Shea, Ethel Waters, and Jerome Hines provided music ministry. Beverly Shea performed the Christian hymn How Great Thou Art 99 times, thus contributing to its popularization. Martin Luther King arrived on July 18, and Billy Graham introduced him by saying, A great social revolution is taking place in the United States today. Dr. King is one of its leaders, and we appreciate that he could take some of his time to come and share his ministry with us.

=== Special meetings ===
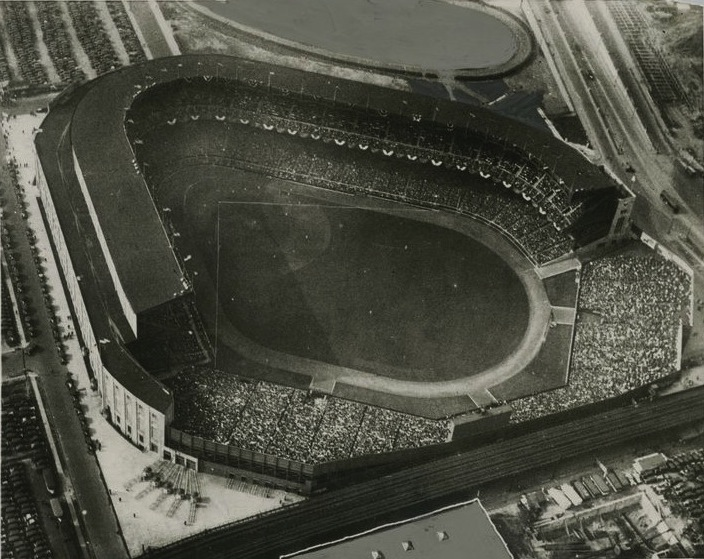
On July 20, a special meeting was held at Yankee Stadium

In addition to the regular meetings at Madison Square Garden, one-time gatherings took place in various parts of New York. Special outdoor meetings were organized at different locations in New York City. On May 19, on the occasion of Norway's Independence Day, Graham spoke at Leif Eriksson Park in Brooklyn. 40,000 people gathered there. On May 25, a meeting was held at the West Side Tennis Stadium (Long Island). One-time meetings took place in Central Park, Harlem, and Wall Street. On June 30, Graham preached on the steps of Salem Methodist Church in Harlem (5,000 participants), on July 7 in Central Park (9,000), and on July 10 on Wall Street where about 30,000 people gathered, including many businessmen. The meeting in Harlem was organized to encourage African American residents of New York to participate in the crusade. On July 13, in the afternoon, a special meeting for Spanish-speaking residents of New York took place near Madison Square Garden. It was the first time Graham spoke through a translator in the USA. On July 14, he spoke on the steps of Cornerstone Church in Brooklyn.

On July 20, a meeting was held at Yankee Stadium, attended by over 100,000 people (over 10,000 were unable to enter). The New York Times noted that never before in the history of the stadium had such a large crowd gathered. That day, the choir consisted of 4,000 people. One of the speakers was Vice President Richard Nixon, who greeted the audience on behalf of President Dwight Eisenhower. (Note: Graham's previous record in the USA was 70,000 at the Dallas Cotton Bowl in 1953 (Dugan (1957-07-02). "100,000 Jam Stadium to Hear Billy Graham". Journal American.).) Nixon said, As a nation, we can be great only if we have faith in God. In his sermon, Graham listed the following threats facing America: communism, the hydrogen bomb, racism, and moral decline. He believed there was only one way to overcome these problems – hope in Jesus Christ.

On September 1, about 125,000 people gathered in Times Square (according to various estimates, between 75,000 and 200,000). (Note: A reporter from United Press International estimated the crowd at 200,000 (Pollock (1966, p. 240)).) In his sermon, Graham spoke about serving false gods. He said, Let us tell the whole world tonight that we Americans believe in God.... Let us tell the whole world that spiritually and morally we are as well prepared as economically and militarily. (Note: "Tonight for a few moments it is being turned into a great cathedral as a symbol of spiritual revival that is now in progress in America. Let us tell the whole world tonight that we Americans believe in God. Let us tell the world tonight that our trust is not in our stock pile of atomic and hydrogen bombs but in Almighty God. Let us tell the world tonight that we are morally and spiritually strong as well as militarily and economically..." (Mitchell (1957, p. 180)).)

Morning Bible hours were led by Paul Rees, from Monday to Friday, with the first Bible hour taking place on May 20.

=== End of the crusade ===
The meeting at Times Square is considered the official conclusion of the crusade. On September 2, Graham returned to his home in Montreat.

Despite the crusade officially ending on September 1, from September 25 to October 1, Graham organized several additional meetings, the largest of which had 10,000 attendees. Further meetings took place from October 20 to 27, with the final one occurring at the Polo Grounds stadium, where Graham spoke to 40,000 people. Some, like Wilfred Bockelman, consider this meeting the actual end of the crusade. On October 31, the crusade office at 165 West 46th Street, which had been operational for two years, was closed.

== Aftermath ==
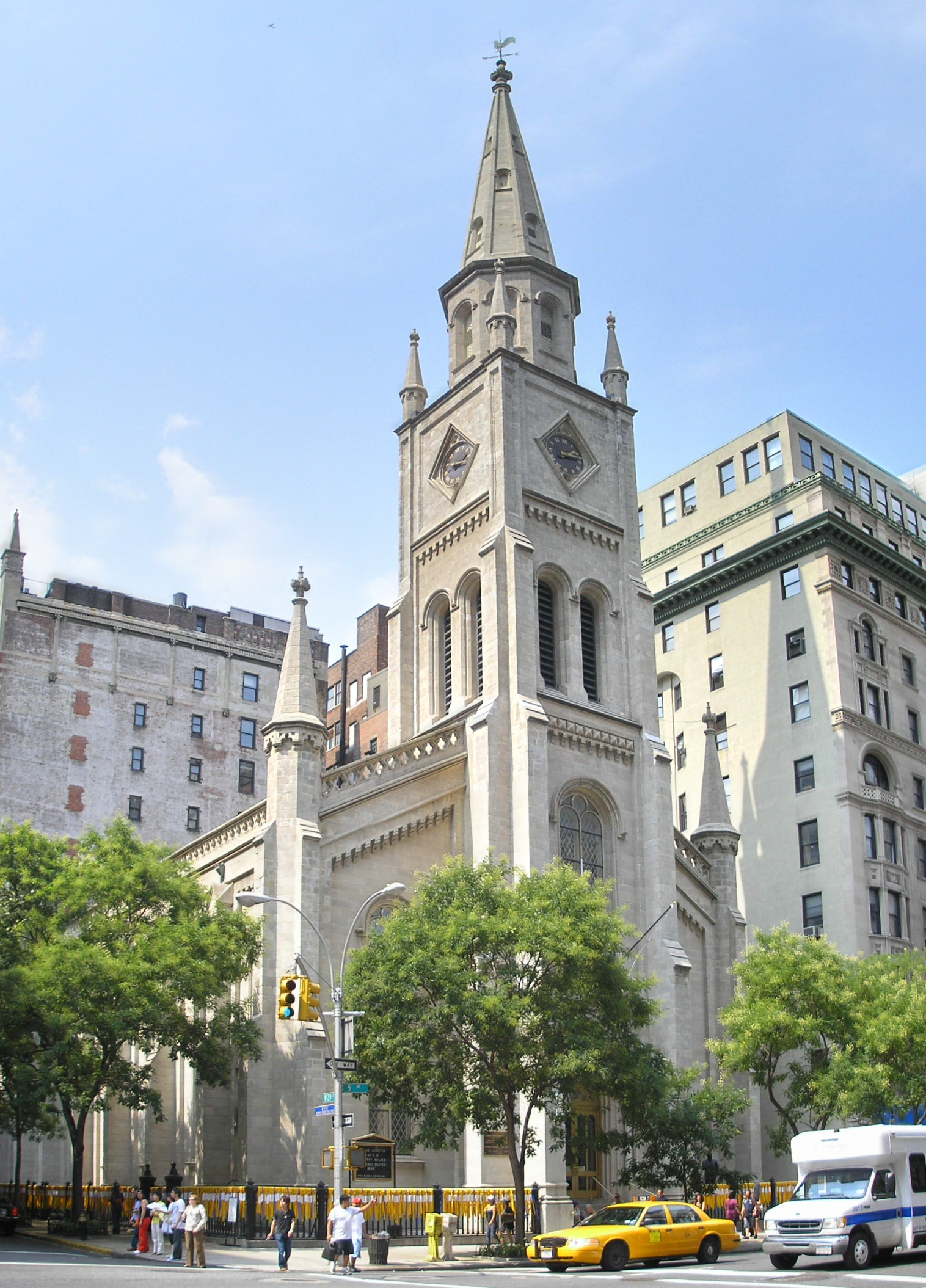
Marble Collegiate Church where the largest group of "converts" were directed

Billy Graham was listened to by approximately 2.4 million attendees in total. In terms of the number of listeners, this evangelization reached greater proportions than all the previous ones conducted in New York, including the 1917 evangelization by Billy Sunday (approximately one million participants). After the crusade, the number of people attending churches increased, but not to the extent expected. 6,000 to 10,000 new members joined Protestant churches.

According to Graham's team, during the crusade, 56,767 people made the decision to dedicate their lives to Christ (each of them provided their address on so-called decision cards). 7,947 of them had no previous affiliation with any denomination, (Note: The New York Times on June 14 estimated that 44% of those who made the decision to convert did not belong to any church (Mitchell (1957, p. 113)).) while the rest belonged to churches (86%). In this group, 63% attended church regularly, meaning at least once a month (according to a survey). Regarding the question of what making the decision to dedicate their lives to Christ entailed, the responses were as follows:

- Accepting Christ as Savior and Lord (for the first time in life) – 59%
- Assurance of salvation – 6%
- Rededication – 10%
- Renewal of faith – 5%
- Reaffirmation of faith – 15%.

According to John Pollock, Graham's biographer, the number of signed "decision cards" was around 61,000. The "converted" were directed to various churches. The largest number, 373, was allocated to the liberal Protestant church Marble Collegiate Church. Henry J. Pratt estimated that this was the first time the Protestant Council of New York came into direct contact with its faithful.

Additionally, based on the letters received by BGEA, it was reported that 65,000 television viewers were converted.

During the crusade, three important factors came into play, on which American evangelicalism was divided: liberal theology, evangelical fundamentalism, and the fight for civil rights for African Americans. The extent to which the crusade contributed to discrediting liberal theology, marginalizing evangelical fundamentalism, and highlighting Martin Luther King's struggle has not yet been fully examined by historians.

After this crusade, Billy Graham lost approximately 14 kg of body weight and was physically exhausted.

In 1958, the film The Heart is a Rebel was made, starring Ethel Waters in the lead role. The film was inspired by Graham's New York Crusade.

== Reception ==
H.B. Shaffer, at the beginning of the crusade on June 5, compared it to Billy Sunday's 1917 crusade and recalled that the press also predicted failure then, announcing it as "Billy's Rubicon" because New York was considered "the graveyard of evangelists". According to Shaffer, New York is the ultimate test of an evangelist's power.

During this crusade, Billy Graham pushed his ecumenism further than ever before. He stated that he would send participants of the crusade back to their own churches – Catholic, Protestant, Jewish... and the rest to God. This statement was later reiterated in interviews for the San Francisco News published on September 21 and November 11.

In the fundamentalist Protestant community, voices emerged labeling Billy Graham as the Antichrist. The reason was his referral of "converts" to various churches: liberal Protestant, fundamentalist Protestant, Adventist, Catholic, and even Jewish synagogues. According to these critics, Graham sent people who had entrusted their lives to Christ to churches that reject Christ's teachings. Pastor Carl McIntire recalled Graham's statement from 1948, in which he said that the World Council of Churches was heading towards choosing an Antichrist, and then commented that Graham was now helping to build churches that were part of it. The following year, Ernest Pickering criticized Graham on behalf of fundamentalist Christians. Just after the San Francisco crusade, Pickering published a pamphlet stating that Graham had been a tool of God and had done much for fundamentalist Christianity in his time, leading it out of obscurity and making the Gospel a national good, but in recent times, he had turned away and drawn closer to liberals. Pickering reminded that during the Scotland Crusade (1955), Graham stated, I am not a fundamentalist. He pointed out that during the New York Crusade, "converts" were sent to liberal churches, and of the money remaining after the crusade, $67,618 was donated to liberal churches in New York. Fundamentalist Christian money was used to support modernists. Pickering called on all fundamentalist Protestants to cease supporting Graham's crusades from then on.

Among the staunch critics of Graham from the fundamentalist side was Bob Jones, who had previously believed that Graham's activities were not the work of God. Jones could not accept the fact that the crusade was funded by liberal Protestant churches. (Note: Graham initially studied theology at Bob Jones College. He dropped out after one semester because, in his opinion, the college was too restrictive and legalistic (Gibbs, Nancy; Ostling, Richard N. (1993-11-15). "God's Billy Pulpit". Time Magazine.).) Jones criticized Graham for organizing integrated crusades for blacks and whites, believing that whites and blacks would never want to sit beside each other, and racial segregation would always exist in the church.

J. A. Johnson called Graham the "Jehoshaphat of our time". John C. Whitcomb accused Graham of apostasy, which he allegedly committed in 1957.

Criticism also came from liberal Protestants. A certain Christian publisher accused Graham of wanting to roll back religion fifty years. Others accused him of doing more harm to Christianity than anyone else in two thousand years. Theologian Reinhold Niebuhr, even during the crusade, wrote a critical article in Life, accusing him of simplifying life's problems and offering too easy solutions. However, he praised Graham for his crusades not being as common and commercialized as Billy Sunday's crusades. Niebuhr initiated criticism of Graham among theologians.

Only one critical article came from the Catholic community, written by an official from the National Catholic Welfare Council. He wrote that Catholics should not participate in Protestant religious ceremonies, and that Billy is a threat to faith. According to Graham, this was the only opposition from the Catholic side, and none of the known Catholic hierarchs spoke out against the evangelization of New York.

John A. Mackay, a Presbyterian theologian and ecumenist, and rector of the liberal Princeton Theological Seminary, positively evaluated the crusade. He stated that the participants of Graham's crusade would be more responsible and effective in fulfilling their duties in society. He believed that the Christian community would be strengthened, social structures would be transformed, and thus the Kingdom of God would be brought closer. However, he noted that the consequences of the crusade would largely depend on local churches and cooperation between them.

Norman Vincent Peale, a preacher from the Marble Collegiate Church and the creator of the theory of positive thinking, wrote to Graham on October 22 that his spiritual life had become stronger and deeper thanks to his sermons, and his church had been wonderfully led since the time of the crusade.

Uta Andrea Balbier assessed in 2009 that the New York Crusade was the most expansive undertaking in the history of American evangelicalism.

== See also ==
- List of Billy Graham's crusades
- Los Angeles Crusade (1949)
- London Crusade (1954)

== Bibliography ==
- Balbier, Uta Andrea (2009). "Billy Graham's Crusades In the 1950s: Neo-Evangelicalism Between Civil Religion, Media, and Consumerism". Bulletin of the GHI. 44. German Historical Institute.
- Burnham, George; Fisher, Lee (1957). Billy Graham and the New York crusade. Grand Rapids, Michigan: Zondervan Pub. House.
- Ferm, Robert O. (1957). They met God at the New York crusade: conversion experiences. Billy Graham Evangelistic Association.
- Graham, Billy (1957). Why We Must Go To New York. BGEA. Archived from the original on 2014-05-26.
- Graham, Billy (2010). "Maraton na Manhattanie". Taki, jaki jestem (in Polish). Translated by Marcol, J. Wydawnictwo THEOLOGOS. ISBN 978-83-927002-5-8.
- Mitchell, Curtis (1957). God In The Garden. The Story of the Billy Graham New York Crusade. New York: Doubleday & Company.
- Pickering, Ernest (1958). Should Fundamentalists Support the Billy Graham Crusades?. Chicago: Independent Fundamental Churches of America. Archived from the original on 2013-12-02.
- Pollock, John (1966). The Billy Graham Story: The Authorized Biography. London: Hodder and Stoughton.
- Rosell, Garth M. (2008-07-01). The Surprising Work of God: Harold John Ockenga, Billy Graham, and the Rebirth of Evangelicalism. Baker Academic. ISBN 978-0-8010-3570-8.
- Wirt, Sherwood Eliot (1997). Billy: A Personal Look at Billy Graham, the World's Best-loved Evangelist. Wheaton, Illinois: Crossway Books. ISBN 0891079343.
- "Dedicated "deciders" in Billy Graham crusade". LIFE. 1957-07-01. pp. 86–91.
- Niebuhr, Reinhold (1957-07-01). "Differing Views on Billy Graham". LIFE.
