= Grady B. Wilson =

American evangelist (1919–1987)

Grady Baxter Wilson (1919–1987) was an American evangelist. He was a childhood friend, and later a close associate of Billy Graham, serving as the inaugural vice president of the Billy Graham Evangelistic Association. Like Graham, Wilson was converted in 1934 under the preaching of Mordecai Ham.

In 1978, he suffered a heart attack that led to a quadruple bypass; he died of congestive heart failure on October 30, 1987, in Charlotte, North Carolina.
