= Oiltown, U.S.A. =

- Directed by: Dick Ross
- Written by: Dick Ross
- Produced by: George Cleveland
- Starring: Colleen Townsend; Paul Power; Billy Graham
- Production companies: World Wide Pictures & Great Commission Films
- Distributed by: Billy Graham Evangelistic Association
- Release date: 27 February 1953
- Running time: 72 minutes
- Country: United States
- Language: English

Oiltown, U.S.A. is a 1953 American Christian Technicolor drama film directed by Dick Ross. It stars Colleen Townsend, Paul Power, and Billy Graham. It is the sequel to the 1951 western Mr. Texas. It was shown to audiences free of cost.

== Plot ==
In Houston, Texas, Les Manning is a ruthless oil tycoon. One day, his daughter Christine returns to Houston from college with her friend Jane to spend the summer at her family home. It is revealed that her mother died of an unspecified illness when she was little, and that Les seldom talks about her. One of Les' employees named Bob Johnson contacts Katherine and Jim Tyler to lease their ranch for Manning Oil Company.

Having spent time with the Tylers, Christine begin talking more about religion. This upsets Les, who confronts Jim and later forbids her from seeing the couple. Christine finds out from Bob what her father is like as a person. At the office, Les has an argument with Bob and fires him. Meanwhile, Christine spends the night with the Tylers. The day after, Les watches television, where Billy Graham is holding a sermon with emphasis on Christian sin. Les then gets a phone call informing him of a fire in Texas City, where Christine is visiting. Ensuring that she is unharmed, he realizes his wrongdoings and accepts God.

== Cast ==
- Colleen Townsend (billed Colleen Evans) as Christine Manning
- Paul Power as Les Manning
- Billy Graham as himself
- Cindy Walker as Katherine Tyler
- Redd Harper as Jim Tyler
- Georgia Lee as Jane Hughes
- Robert Clarke as Bob Johnson
- Willa Pearl Curtis as Sally
- George Beverly Shea as himself
