= How Great Thou Art =

Christian hymn

- Key: A Major
- Genre: Hymn
- Written: 1885
- Text: Carl Boberg
- Language: Swedish
- Based on: Psalm 8
- Meter: 11.10.11.10 with refrain
- Melody: How Great Thou Art

Audio sample
- MIDI audio sample: file; help

"'How Great Thou Art'" is a Christian hymn based on a Swedish hymn entitled "O Store Gud" (eng: "Oh Great God") written in 1885 by Swedish poet and minister Carl Boberg. The English version of the hymn and its title are a loose translation from 1949 by English missionary Stuart K. Hine. The hymn was popularised by George Beverly Shea and Cliff Barrows during Billy Graham's crusades. It was voted the British public's favourite hymn by BBC's Songs of Praise. "How Great Thou Art" was ranked second (after "Amazing Grace") on a list of the favourite hymns of all time in a survey by Christianity Today magazine in 2001 and in a nationwide poll by Songs Of Praise in 2019.

== Origin ==
Boberg wrote the poem "O Store Gud" ("O Great God") with nine stanzas. It was first published in 1886.

=== Inspiration ===
The inspiration for the poem came when Boberg was walking home from church near Kronobäck, Sweden, and listening to church bells. A sudden storm got Boberg's attention, and then just as suddenly as it had made its appearance, it subsided to a peaceful calm, which Boberg observed over Mönsterås Bay. According to J. Irving Erickson:

Carl Boberg and some friends were returning home to Mönsterås from Kronobäck, where they had participated in an afternoon service. Presently, a thundercloud appeared on the horizon, and soon lightning flashed across the sky. Strong winds swept over the meadows and billowing fields of grain. The thunder pealed in loud claps. Then rain came in cool, fresh showers. In a little while, the storm was over, and a rainbow appeared. When Boberg arrived home, he opened the window and saw the bay of Mönsterås like a mirror before him… From the woods on the other side of the bay, he heard the song of a thrush… the church bells were tolling in the quiet evening. It was this series of sights, sounds, and experiences that inspired the writing of the song.

According to Boberg's great-nephew, Bud Boberg, "My dad's story of its origin was that it was a paraphrase of Psalm 8 and was used in the 'underground church' in Sweden in the late 1800s when the Baptists and Mission Friends were persecuted." The author, Carl Boberg, gave the following information about the inspiration behind his poem:

It was that time of year when everything seemed to be in its richest colouring; the birds were singing in trees and everywhere. It was very warm; a thunderstorm appeared on the horizon and soon there was thunder and lightning. We had to hurry to shelter. But the storm was soon over and the clear sky appeared. When I came home I opened my window toward the sea. There evidently had been a funeral and the bells were playing the tune of "When eternity's clock calls my saved soul to its Sabbath rest". That evening, I wrote the song, "O Store Gud".

=== Publication and music ===
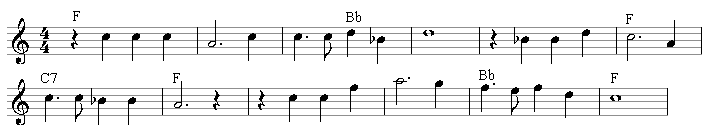

Boberg first published "O Store Gud" in the Mönsterås Tidningen (Mönsterås News) on 13 March 1886.

The poem became matched to an old Swedish folk tune and sung in public for the first-known occasion in a church in the Swedish province of Värmland in 1888. Eight verses appeared with the music in the 1890 hymnal Sions Harpan.

In 1890, Boberg became the editor of Sanningsvittnet (Witness to the Truth). The words and music were published for the first time in the 16 April 1891 edition of Sanningsvittnet. Instrumentation for both piano and guitar was provided by Adolph Edgren (born 1858; died 1921 in Washington, DC), a music teacher and organist, who later migrated to the United States.

Boberg later sold the rights to the Svenska Missionsförbundet (Mission Covenant Church of Sweden). In 1891, all nine verses were published in the 1891 Covenant songbook, Sanningsvittnet. These versions were all in 3/4 time. In 1894, the Svenska Missionsförbundet sångbok published "O Store Gud" in 4/4 time, as it has been sung ever since).

In 1914, the Swedish Evangelical Mission Covenant of America published four verses of "O store Gud!" in their hymnal, De Ungas Sångbok: utgiven för Söndagsskolan Ungdomsmötet och hemmet. The Swedish version that appeared in this edition was:

| 1914 Swedish-American version | Literal English translation |
|---|---|
| Stanza 1: O store Gud, när jag den verld beskådar Som du har skapat med ditt allmaktsord, Hur der din visdom leder lifvets trådar, Och alla väsen mättas vid ditt bord: Refrain: Då brister själen ut i lofsångsljud: O store Gud, O store Gud! Då brister själen ut i lofsångsljud: O store Gud, O store Gud! | Stanza 1: O great God, when I behold that world You have created with your omnipotent word, How your wisdom guides the threads of life, And all beings are fed at your table: Refrain: Then my soul bursts forth into praise: O great God, O great God! Then my soul bursts forth into praise: O great God, O great God! |
| Stanza 2: När jag betraktar himlens höga under, Der gyllne verldsskepp plöja etern blå, Och sol och måne mäta tidens stunder Och vexla om, som tvänne klockor gå: Refrain | Stanza 2: When I consider the high wonders of heaven, Where golden vessels plow the ether blue, And sun and moon measure the moments of time And alternate, as two bells go: Refrain |
| Stanza 3: När jag hör åskans röst i stormen brusa Och blixtens klingor springa fram ur skyn, När regnets kalla, friska vindar susa Och löftets båge glänser för min syn: Refrain | Stanza 3: When I hear the voice of thunder in the storm roaring And the blades of lightning run out of the sky, When the cold, fresh winds of the rain whistle And the bow of promise shines in my sight: Refrain |
| Stanza 4: När sommarvinden susar över fälten, När blommor dofta omkring källans strand, När trastar drilla i de gröna tälten Ur furuskogens tysta, dunkla rand: Refrain | Stanza 4: When the summer wind blows over the fields, When flowers scent the spring's shore, When thrushes trill in the green tents From the silent, dark edge of the pine forest: Refrain |

== English translations ==
=== E. Gustav Johnson (1925) ===
The first literal English translation of "O store Gud" was written by E. Gustav Johnson (1893–1974), then a professor of North Park College, Illinois. His translation of verses 1, 2, and 7–9 was published in the United States in the Covenant Hymnal as "O Mighty God" in 1925.

The first three Covenant hymnals in English used Johnson's translation, with The Covenant Hymnal (1973) including all nine verses of Boberg's original poem. There was a desire to replace Johnson's version with the more popular version of British missionary Stuart K. Hine's "How Great Thou Art". Wiberg explains:

Given the popularity of Stuart Hine's translation of How Great Thou Art in the late 60s and early 70s, the Hymnal Commission struggled with whether to go with the more popular version or retain E. Gustav Johnson's translation. However, economics settled the issue inasmuch as we were unable to pay the exorbitant price requested by the publishing house that owned the copyright despite the fact that the original belonged to the Covenant.

The version that appeared in the 1973 edition of The Covenant Hymnbook was:

O mighty God, when I behold the wonder
Of nature's beauty, wrought by words of thine,
And how thou leadest all from realms up yonder,
Sustaining earthly life with love benign,

Refrain:
With rapture filled, my soul thy name would laud,
O mighty God! O mighty God! (repeat)

When I behold the heavens in their vastness,
Where golden ships in azure issue forth,
Where sun and moon keep watch upon the fastness
Of changing seasons and of time on earth.

When crushed by guilt of sin before thee kneeling,
I plead for mercy and for grace and peace,
I feel thy balm and, all my bruises healing,
My soul is filled, my heart is set at ease.

And when at last the mists of time have vanished
And I in truth my faith confirmed shall see,
Upon the shores where earthly ills are banished
I'll enter Lord, to dwell in peace with thee.

In 1996, Johnson's translation was replaced in The Covenant Hymnal—A Worshipbook because "E Gustav Johnson’s version, while closer to the original, uses a more archaic language." However, according to Glen V. Wiberg:

While there was sympathy on the commission for retaining this older version, a compromise led to preserving it in printed form on the opposite page of How Great Thou Art, hymn 8. The new version with fresher language and some striking metaphors seems uneven and incomplete.

=== Stuart K. Hine (1949 version) ===
Plymouth Brethren missionary Stuart Wesley Keene Hine (25 July 1899 – 14 March 1989) was dedicated to Jesus Christ in The Salvation Army by his parents. Hine was led to Christ by Madame Annie Ryall on 22 February 1914, and was baptised shortly thereafter. Hine was influenced greatly by the teachings of British Baptist evangelist Charles Spurgeon.

Hine first heard the Russian translation of the German version of the song while on an evangelistic mission to the Carpathian Mountains, then of the Soviet's Ukrainian SSR, in 1931. Upon hearing it, Hine was inspired to create his English paraphrase known as "How Great Thou Art", including that phrase four times in the refrain. According to Michael Ireland, "Hine and his wife, Mercy, learned the Russian translation, and started using it in their evangelistic services. Hine also started re-writing some of the verses --- and writing new verses (all in Russian) --- as events inspired him."

==== Verse 3 ====
One of the verses Hine added was the current third verse:

And when I think that God, His Son not sparing,
Sent Him to die, I scarce can take it in;
That on the Cross, my burden gladly bearing,
He bled and died to take away my sin.

Michael Ireland explains the origin of this original verse written by Hine:

It was typical of the Hines to ask if there were any Christians in the villages they visited. In one case, they found out that the only Christians that their host knew about were a man named Dmitri and his wife Lyudmila. Dmitri's wife knew how to read – evidently a fairly rare thing at that time and in that place. She taught herself how to read because a Russian soldier had left a Bible behind several years earlier, and she started slowly learning by reading that Bible. When the Hines arrived in the village and approached Dmitri's house, they heard a strange and wonderful sound: Dmitri's wife was reading from the gospel of John about the crucifixion of Christ to a houseful of guests, and those visitors were in the very act of repenting. In Ukraine (as I know first hand!), this act of repenting is done very much out loud. So the Hines heard people calling out to God, saying how unbelievable it was that Christ would die for their own sins, and praising Him for His love and mercy. They just couldn't barge in and disrupt this obvious work of the Holy Spirit, so they stayed outside and listened. Stuart wrote down the phrases he heard the Repenters use, and (even though this was all in Russian), it became the third verse that we know today: "And when I think that God, His Son not sparing, Sent Him to die, I scarce can take it in."

The Hines had to leave Ukraine during the Holodomor or Famine Genocide perpetrated on Ukraine by Joseph Stalin during the winter of 1932–1933, and they also left Eastern Europe at the outbreak of the Second World War in 1939, returning to Britain, where they settled in Somerset. Hine continued his evangelistic ministry in Britain working among the displaced Polish refugee community.

==== Verse 4 ====
The fourth verse was another innovation of Stuart Hine, which was added after the Second World War. His concern for the exiled Polish community in Britain, who were anxious to return home, provided part of the inspiration for Hine's final verse. In 1948, Hine and David Griffiths visited a camp in Sussex, England, where displaced Russians were being held, but where only two were professing Christians. The testimony of one of these refugees and his anticipation of the second coming of Christ inspired Hine to write the fourth stanza of his English version of the hymn. According to Ireland:

One man to whom they were ministering told them an amazing story: he had been separated from his wife at the very end of the war, and had not seen her since. At the time they were separated, his wife was a Christian, but he was not, but he had since been converted. His deep desire was to find his wife so they could at last share their faith together. But he told the Hines that he did not think he would ever see his wife on earth again. Instead he was longing for the day when they would meet in heaven, and could share in the Life Eternal there. These words again inspired Hine, and they became the basis for his fourth and final verse to 'How Great Thou Art': "When Christ shall come with shout of acclamation to take me home, what joy shall fill my heart. Then we shall bow in humble adoration and there proclaim, My God How Great Thou Art!"

==== Optional verses by Hine ====
In Hine's book, Not You, but God: A Testimony to God's Faithfulness, Hine presents two additional, optional verses that he copyrighted in 1953 as a translation of the Russian version, that are generally omitted from hymnals published in the United States:

O when I see ungrateful man defiling
This bounteous earth, God's gifts so good and great;
In foolish pride, God's holy Name reviling,
And yet, in grace, His wrath and judgment wait.

When burdens press, and seem beyond endurance,
Bowed down with grief, to Him I lift my face;
And then in love He brings me sweet assurance:
'My child! for thee sufficient is my grace'.

==== Subsequent history ====
In 1948, Hine finished composing the final verse. Hine finalised his English translation in 1949, and published the final four-verse version in his own Russian gospel magazine Grace and Peace that same year. As Grace and Peace was circulated among refugees in fifteen countries around the world, including North and South America, Hine's version of "O store Gud" ("How Great Thou Art") became popular in each country it reached. British missionaries began to spread the song around the world to former British colonies in Africa and India in approximately its current English version.

According to Hine, James Caldwell, a missionary from Central Africa, introduced Hine's version to the United States when he sang it at a Bible conference of the Stony Brook Assembly in Stony Brook, New York, on Long Island in the summer of 1951.

Hine published hymns and evangelical literature in various languages, including Eastern Melodies & Hymns of other Lands (1956) and The Story of "How Great Thou art": How it came to be written ... With complete album of hymns of other lands ... Russian melodies, Eastern melodies, etc (1958). Hine died on 14 March 1989, his last place of residence being Seagull Cottage, Walton-on-the-Naze, Essex. His memorial service was held at the Gospel Hall in that town on 23 March 1989.

=== Manna Music version (1955) ===
A program note from a Gustavus Adolphus College, Minnesota, concert tells listeners that J. Edwin Orr (15 January 1912 – 22 April 1987) of Fuller Theological Seminary in Pasadena, California, discovered the song being sung in a small village near Deolali, India, by a choir of the Naga tribe from Assam near Burma. The tribesmen had arranged the harmony themselves, and a Mennonite missionary had transcribed it.

Orr was so impressed with the song that he introduced it at the Forest Home Christian Conference Center in the San Bernardino Mountains of southern California founded in 1938 by Henrietta Mears (23 October 1890 – 19 March 1963) in the summer of 1954. Mears' publishing company, Gospel Light Press, published Hine's version of the song in 1954. However, according to Manna Music's website,

Dr. Orr’s theme for the week of the conference was "Think not what great things you can do for God, but think first of whatever you can do for a great God." And so he introduced the song at the start of the conference and it was sung each day. Attending the Forest Home college-age conference were Hal Spencer and his sister, Loretta, son and daughter of Tim Spencer, who was a songwriter and publisher of Christian music. Hal and Loretta borrowed the song sheet from Dr. Orr and brought it home and gave it to their father.

Their father was Vernon "Tim" Spencer (13 July 1908 – 26 April 1974), a converted cowboy, and former member of The Sons of the Pioneers, who had founded the newly established Manna Music of Burbank, California in 1955. Spencer negotiated with Hine for the purchase of the song.

The Manna Music editors changed works and mighty in Hine's original translation to worlds and rolling respectively. According to Manna Music, "Presently it is considered, and has been for several years, to be the most popular Gospel song in the world."

The first time "How Great Thou Art" was sung in the United States was at the aforementioned Forest Home conference in 1954, led by Dr. Orr. In honor of this event, Forest Home had the words to the song carved on a polished Redwood plaque. This plaque hangs on the wall of Hormel Hall at Forest Home to this day, enabling people to sing it at any time and to help in learning the song.

The first major American recording of "How Great Thou Art" was by Bill Carle in a 1958 Sacred Records album of the same name (LP 9018). He reprised the song on his album Who Hath Measured the Waters In the Hollow of His Hand (Sacred Records LP 9041) later that year.

==== Billy Graham Evangelistic Crusades ====
The Manna Music version of the song was popularised as the “signature song” of the 1950s Billy Graham Crusades. It was popularized by George Beverly Shea and Cliff Barrows during Billy Graham crusades. According to Ireland:

As the story goes, when the Billy Graham team went to London in 1954 for the Harringay Arena Crusade in Haringey, they were given a pamphlet containing Hine's work. "At first they ignored it, but fortunately not for long," said [Bud] Boberg. They worked closely with Hine to prepare the song for use in their campaigns. They sang it in the 1955 Toronto campaign, but it didn't really catch on until they took it to Madison Square Garden in 1957. According to Cliff Barrows (Dr. Graham's longtime associate), they sang it one hundred times during that campaign because the people wouldn't let them stop."

The pamphlet had been given to Shea by his friend George Gray, who worked with the Pickering and Inglis publishing firm, on Oxford Street in London in 1954. Barrows, who also had been given a copy, had Paul Mickelson (died 21 October 2001) arrange the song for use in the 1955 Toronto Crusade. George Beverly Shea's recording of the hymn ranks number 204 on the top recordings of the 20th century according to the Recording Industry Association of America.

Evangelist Billy Graham said: "The reason I like 'How Great Thou Art' is because it glorifies God. It turns Christian's eyes toward God, rather than upon themselves. I use it as often as possible because it is such a God-honoring song."

=== Christiansen translation (1956) ===
A translation exists by Avis B. Christiansen, retaining the "O Store Gud" melody with an arrangement by Robert J. Hughes. This version, titled "Lord, I Adore Thee", appears in the 1958 hymnal Songs for Worship.

=== Bayly translation (1957) ===
The hymn was translated in 1957 for InterVarsity Christian Fellowship by Joseph T. Bayly (5 April 1920 – 16 July 1986), and set to the music of Josephine Carradine Dixon. According to Bud Boberg, the grandson of the younger brother of the original author of the poem:

"It's a quite literal translation from Boberg, but I suspect that he had the Hine work at hand because he uses the phrase 'how great Thou art.' Also, the music by Josephine Carradine Dixon is similar to Hine's. He added two verses of his own."

== Other translations ==
=== German translation (1907) ===
The song was first translated from Swedish to German by a wealthy Baltic German Baptist nobleman, Manfred von Glehn (born 1867 in Jelgimaggi, Estonia; died 1924 in Brazil), who had heard the hymn in Estonia, where there was a Swedish-speaking minority. It was first published in Blankenburger Lieder. The song became popular in Germany, where "Wie groß bist Du" is the common title (the first line is "Du großer Gott"). Most German hymnals contain only the first four verses of von Glehn's translation, so the last two are not well known in Germany.

=== Russian translation (1912) ===
Eventually, the German version reached Russia where a Russian version entitled "Velikiy Bog" (Великий Бог - 'Great God') was produced in 1912 by Ivan S. Prokhanov (1869–1935), the "Martin Luther of Russia", and "the most prolific Protestant hymn writer and translator in all of Russia" at that time in a Russian-language Protestant hymnbook published in St. Petersburg (later Leningrad), Kymvali ('Cymbals'). An enlarged edition of this hymnbook entitled Songs of a Christian, including "Velikiy Bog" was released in 1927.

=== Spanish translation (1958) ===
The hymn was translated into Spanish by Pastor Arturo W. Hotton, from Argentina, in 1958 by the name of "Cuán grande es Él". He was an evangelical leader of the Plymouth Brethren denomination. By the 1960s, it began to be sung by many evangelical churches in the Spanish-speaking world.

=== Erik Routley (1982) ===
The eminent British hymnologist Erik Routley (born 31 October 1917; died 1982) so disliked both the hymn and its melody, he wrote a new text, "O Mighty God", and re-harmonised the Swedish tune in 1982. This was one of his last works before his death. His translation was included as hymn 466 in Rejoice in the Lord: A Hymn Companion to the Scriptures (1985).

In English, the first line is "O Lord, my God"; and the hymn may appear with that heading, especially in British hymnals, where first-line citation is the dominant practice. English-language hymnals prevailingly indicate the tune title as the Swedish first line, O STORE GUD.

=== Māori version ===
In New Zealand, the hymn tune is most widely known through a different hymn called "Whakaaria Mai". The Māori verses were composed by Canon Wiremu Te Tau Huata, who served as a chaplain during WWII for the 28th (Māori) Battalion and composed many famous waiata. While set to the music of "How Great Thou Art", and often combined with the English version of this hymn, the Māori lyrics are instead a loose translation of the hymn "Abide with Me". The hymn was popularised by Sir Howard Morrison, who sang it at the Royal Command Performance in 1981 upon the occasion of the visit of Queen Elizabeth II to New Zealand. When Morrison released it as a single in 1982, "Whakaaria Mai" spent six months in the New Zealand national charts, including five weeks in the number one position.

"Whakaaria Mai" has subsequently become a mainstay of New Zealand popular culture. It has been covered by numerous New Zealand artists, including Prince Tui Teka, Eddie Low, Temuera Morrison and the Modern Māori Quartet, Stan Walker, Dame Kiri Te Kanawa, TEEKS and Hollie Smith. It was also sung by Lizzie Marvelly at the memorial service of New Zealand rugby legend Jonah Lomu. Following the 2019 terrorist attack in Christchurch, John Mayer opened his Auckland show by performing "Whakaaria Mai" / "How Great Thou Art" alongside a kapa haka group as a tribute to Christchurch. In 2017, Canon Wiremu Te Tau Huata was awarded the Music Composers Award (Historical) at the 10th Annual Waiata Māori Music Awards, in part due to his composition of "Whakaaria Mai". On 21 February 2024, members of the New Zealand Parliament stood and sang ''Whakaaria Mai" at the conclusion of tributes to the recently deceased member Efeso Collins. The same thing happened with the death of Takutai Tarsh Kemp.

== Notable performers ==
There have been more than seventeen hundred documented recordings of "How Great Thou Art". It has been used on major television programs, in major motion pictures, and has been named as the favorite Gospel song of at least three United States presidents.

This hymn was the title track of Elvis Presley's second gospel LP How Great Thou Art (RCA LSP/LPM 3758), which was released in March 1967. The song won Presley a Grammy Award for "Best Sacred Performance" in 1967, and another Grammy in 1974 for "Best Inspirational Performance (Non-Classical)" for his live performance album Recorded Live on Stage in Memphis (RCA CPL 1 0606; Released: June 1974) recorded on 20 March 1974 at the Mid-South Coliseum in Memphis, Tennessee. Swedish gospel singer Per-Erik Hallin has credited Elvis Presley's rendition as a major factor in the revival of "O Store Gud" in Sweden.

Anne Murray sang it for her 1999 album "What a Wonderful World". Randy Travis performed this hymn as part of his 2003 album "Worship & Faith".

On 4 April 2011, Carrie Underwood performed this song together with Vince Gill on the ACM Presents: Girls Night Out show. They received a standing ovation. It was televised on CBS on 22 April 2011, and shortly after the show had ended, her single version reached the No. 1 spot in iTunes' Top Gospel Songs and Top 40 in iTunes' All-Genre Songs. It debuted at the No. 2 position on Billboard Christian Digital songs chart and No. 35 on the Country Digital Songs chart. As of December 2014, it has sold 599,000 digital copies in the US. Underwood's version, featuring Gill, is included on her 2014 compilation album, Greatest Hits: Decade #1.

== Other verses ==
Boberg's entire poem appears (with archaic Swedish spellings). Presented below are two of those verses which appear (more or less loosely) translated in British hymnbooks, followed in each case by the English.

När tryckt av synd och skuld jag faller neder,
Vid Herrens fot och ber om nåd och frid.
Och han min själ på rätta vägen leder,
Och frälsar mig från all min synd och strid.

When burdens press, and seem beyond endurance,
Bowed down with grief, to Him I lift my face;
And then in love He brings me sweet assurance:
'My child! for thee sufficient is my grace'.

När jag hör dårar i sin dårskaps dimma
Förneka Gud och håna hvad han sagt,
Men ser likväl, att de hans hjälp förnimma
Och uppehållas af hans nåd och makt.

O when I see ungrateful man defiling
This bounteous earth, God's gifts so good and great;
In foolish pride, God's holy Name reviling,
And yet, in grace, His wrath and judgment wait.

Swedish hymnals frequently include the following verse:

När jag hör åskans röst och stormar brusa
Och blixtens klingor springa fram ur skyn,
När regnets kalla, friska skurar susa
Och löftets båge glänser för min syn.

When I hear the voice of thunder and storms
and see the blades of lightning striking from the sky
when the cold rain and fresh showers whirl
and the arc of promise shines before my eyes.
