= Bill Pearce =

American singer and broadcaster (1926–2010)

- Born: William Jones Pearce; May 20, 1926; Carlisle, Pennsylvania
- Died: February 23, 2010 (aged 83); Xenia, Ohio
- Occupations: broadcaster, singer, musician

Bill Pearce (May 20, 1926 – February 23, 2010) was an American singer, solo trombonist, nationally syndicated broadcaster and inductee into the National Religious Broadcasters Hall of Fame. He died at age 83 on February 23, 2010, from complications of Parkinson's disease.

== Early life ==
William Jones Pearce was born in Carlisle, Pennsylvania, on May 20, 1926. His father was an itinerant Methodist minister with his own daily radio program, Christian Voices, which could be heard on WFIL, WIP and WCAM. He gave the message, his mother played the piano and sang. Bill, along with his brother and sister played together in a brass trio. However, Bill Pearce started out with a totally different instrument in the beginning.

"My first interest in music really was grade school orchestra," he said; "they needed a clarinet player and whether I looked like one or not, I was chosen to play an old metal clarinet. I did not take to that instrument at all, and it just frustrated the dickens out of me. I finally got angry enough to throw it down on my mattress hard enough that I slightly bent it, so we had a repair bill to start out with."

The clarinet would be repaired at the local music shop and Bill's band teacher suggested that he might try a different instrument, the trombone. At ten years old, Bill got his first trombone, "...an old King trombone for $20 at a local second hand shop," he says. He began practicing with the aid of an old Victrola and a 78 rpm of John Philip Sousa marches. His music teacher would come by once a week, and for his first lesson, tied the slide on his trombone so that Bill could not use it. The whole idea was to have him focus on his tone, rather than the notes.

Bill's introduction to jazz came by way of a "very unusual recording" he heard one day:

"On one side of the disc was a recording of Knute Rockne, the famous football coach of Notre Dame, speaking – no, rather, yelling – at his team during halftime and they were losing, so you can imagine the energy there. However.... on the flip side of this funny old recording was a trombone solo by somebody named Tommy Dorsey. It was called 'I'm Getting Sentimental Over You.' Well, you know the rest of the story. I was absolutely intrigued by the sound this guy got on that old scratchy 78, so I thought, well, why can't that be me?"

Bill would continue playing and at 11 years old would begin studying with Donald Rheinhardt, famous for his "Pivot" system of mouthpiece placement. "He was a clinician, a visionary, a pioneer, a trail blazer," recalls Pearce, "and all of the great musicians, both symphonic and jazz, as they came through Philadelphia, would come and spend a couple of hours with Don Rheinhardt." Bill, himself, would spend less than a year with Rheinhardt. "To tell you the truth I did not make out too well as a student of Don Rheinhardt," he says, "because I just felt that he was intimidating – my being so young and all – so I thought it was time to move on."

== First performance ==
Bill made his debut performance on a nationally broadcast radio program in the summer of 1937 on Percy Crawford's radio show, recorded at Pinebrook summer camp (in the Poconos). Bill, along with Percy's wife, Ruth, as an accompanist, played the song "He Lives" – "Two verses and an extra refrain in B flat – no variations", he recalls. (Incidentally, a new Canadian singer by the name of George Beverly Shea was on the same program!)

He would study with two additional teachers before stopping formal lessons altogether.

The third teacher was his band instructor in high school. "He was a military type and very strict about my doing everything it by the book," he recalls (by the way, the "book" in question was the Arban method!). "When he would call me in for a lesson I would know that was pending so I would get about 5 minutes of cramming in to see what I could do with lip trills and making decent sounds and scales and things like that. He didn't dig that at all and finally he dismissed me, saying I wasn't serious enough, that he wanted to spend his time with musicians who really wanted to play."

His fourth teacher was his junior high school teacher who "encouraged me all over the place," he says. "He gave me a solo to learn – he was trying to enter me into the state contest because he thought I showed some promise. I'll never forget that piece he gave me to play; it was called 'La Comparsita.' It was a Latin thing and I got kind of tired of that within 2 pages. I couldn't get into that at all, it was too technical, I thought, another planet for me. It just seemed too impossible, so I thought, well, I'll just try to do what comes to me naturally."

He then proceeded to spend time in the movie theater. "Back in those days you could get into the theater for about 50 cents but you could stay all day," recalls Pearce. "You would see the same movie, but between shows, as they were rewinding the reels, they had these name bands on stage doing a 20 or 30 minutes concert. The first time I heard Tommy Dorsey was when Gene Krupa was his drummer. It was completely dark in the theater and you heard those drums begin – it was Krupa doing a tom-tom solo, and before you knew it they were into 'Song of India.' I was totally mesmerized by the whole thing. Later Glenn Miller came through with his band and that was a precision unit if there ever was one. His brass players were right on the money, just amazing. So that's the kind of dream I had as a kid growing up."

He got to live that dream when he got a spot in Percy Crawford's brass quartet! "As we were better known and got more invitations," he recalls, "we spread out from the Philadelphia area to New York, New England down to Baltimore and Washington DC and so on. That was good training for me – the first trumpet player was sort of a hero to me. He looked sharp, he combed his hair right, his glasses even looked good, dressed correctly, and was just a very clean person. His playing matched his image. So, I learned a lot about purity, how to form a beautiful tone and to play 'within limits!'"

== Career in the United States Marine Corps ==
About this time, World War II broke out, and many high school teenagers were being drafted and joining the army. Bill had other ideas. "Most people waited to be drafted and joined the Army. The Navy quota was full, and I decided I wanted to be a Marine like my father had been. He was a drill instructor and an officer at Parris Island (South Carolina) and at the officer training center in Quantico, VA during World War I. He used to tell me stories about the Marine Corps so, on the basis of that I went down one day and asked to enlist."

Bill enlisted and went through United States Marine Corps Recruit Training at Parris Island, South Carolina; 15 weeks of jungle training at Camp LeJeune, North Carolina; and another several weeks of training at Camp Pendleton, Rancho Santa Margarita y Las Flores, California.

He got shipped out to the 3rd Division, on the way to Iwo Jima and the Pacific, and was ready to go to war. Unknown to him, at the time, his father was having a conversation with a few old war buddies, which would change his course. "My father, having been in the service in World War I, knew some of the military people who had become generals later and one of his speaking engagements in Washington, DC found him over the Pentagon to look up some of his old buddies. As they discussed the old days, he said, 'I've got a son who's an army physician in the Army and a younger son who's in the Marine Corps down at LeJeune, shipping out.' They checked on me in the records and found I was indeed a machine gunner in the infantry, on the way to the Pacific."

Meanwhile, Bill was getting ready to board a train to take him to the west coast, and then, to the Pacific, when he heard a sergeant call his name, "'I don't know who in "H" you know [...] but you've been transferred out of this unit. Get your gear and move over to Hadnot Point' (the main barracks for Camp LeJeune)," he said. With that, Bill Pearce was back at Camp LeJeune in the Camp LeJeune staff band, as the first trombonist, marching in the pivot position of the front line next to the director. This would last for about six months, when they got a new general for Camp LeJeune. He was, as Pearce recalled, "a tough number and decided that no Marine should go through his tour of duty without going overseas or seeing action or something like that. So before I knew it I was on the train again with my 60 pound pack and sea bag going out to the Pacific theatre. I made it as far as Hawaii."

In Hawaii, ready to ship out for combat duty, Pearce once again found himself wielding a trombone rather than a gun. "The day we were being shipped out," he recalls, "was an awfully rainy morning. I was depressed and in a blue funk when I heard this 'sound!' I went to see what it was and it was a big band going through their paces, warming up. When they had a brief break I went to the Sergeant who was leading and said, 'Who do I talk to get into something like this?' He said, 'What's your interest?' and I said I play trombone. He said, 'I'll tell you what, we have rehearsal here at 10 o'clock every morning – get permission from your Commanding officer and come on around here tomorrow morning so we can audition you.' Well, the next day, I got my Don Reinhardt Mouthpiece out of my sea bag and grabbed a trombone from somewhere and they brought over a pianist and a fair to middling drummer and a bass player and said, 'Well, what do you want to kick off?' So I thought a second and remembered we had played in junior high something called 'Honeysuckle Rose,' in the key of F, so I said, 'How about Honeysuckle Rose, in the key of F?' And he said, 'Great.' So he gave me an intro. I guess I went about half way through it, having not played for quite a while, but evidently they had heard enough so the Sergeant said, 'Hold it!' He told me to go down to the quartermaster, and turn in my rifle and grab a trombone from the warehouse of musical instruments. Well, as you can imagine I hopped to and that warehouse had the best of everything – Steinway pianos and French Selmers – you name it. I picked out a beautiful French Selmer trombone with a white case and a purple plush lining inside and engraving all the way up the bell and a big "USMC" down the front and man, this was a class item! So, that's what I did during – playing my way, entertaining Navy and Marine Corps troops in the Pacific theatre and mainland China until discharge."

== College days and two more careers ==
After World War II, Bill took advantage of the GI bill and went back to college. He soon found that college wasn't necessarily a good fit for him. "I never did too well in school. I was a learning disability kid – of course we didn't know what it was back then. I didn't seem to be able to learn in the system, I wasn't able to concentrate, or to retain any kind of information. I think now they call it Attention Deficit Disorder, or Learning Deficit Disorder." He continued to work as a truck driver, played a few dance jobs, he even joined the American Legion drum and bugle corps.

He wound up in Chicago, a while later, and decided to attend the Moody Bible Institute. He lasted about a semester. He ended up flunking out. However, one door may have closed, but a second one was just about to open. "I wandered up to the radio department of Moody," Pearce recalls. "They owned about seven big stations, and the head announcer said to me, 'I can't get you out of my mind – would you ever have any interest in taking an announcing job here at WMBI radio?' I said, 'No, not really, because I have a pretty bad Philadelphia accent and I don't know what to say.' And he said, 'Why don't you take a shot at it?' So I did; I took an audition, and he evidently passed me. I think he was either an angel or the Lord put him there, because he was 'the man in the middle' who was really standing there at the time I was wavering. He talked to the program director even though I didn't have the greatest record at the school, so they put me on six months' probation. I got the job and stayed for 25 years."

During the six months probation Pearce made the decision to make the most of the opportunity he'd been given, and become more eloquent. "I'm going to be a loser in life, I'm a drifter," he recalls. "Here's God's opportunity that He's given me, so I decided I was going to learn how to speak. Tape was just invented then and they had a Magnacord tape recorder at WMBI. So I got with that tape recorder and I practiced vocabulary through the Reader's Digest 'Word Power' section, learned a new word every couple of days and used it. I worked on the vowel sounds and listened to the great voices at NBC and CBS like Dave Garroway and Paul Harvey. I was a newsman and announcer and I worked on my stuttering and my air-headedness and fortunately found an older man at the radio station who took an interest in helping me and got me into the Word of God. He taught me to think more clearly in some other areas than my own interest, and also urged me to keep a 'journal' which I do to this day. He really helped me to get my feet on the ground."

Bill would move up to become "Special Events Director" for WMBI, he would also branch out and start doing interviews. One morning, he was chatting with a morning announcer, and the announcer happened to ask him if he sang, to which Bill replied he hadn't thought about it. "Well, why don't you do a solo for us sometime one morning?" the announcer asked.

He did just that, and was teamed up with a new arrival in the station, named Dick Anthony. This would become the team of Pearce and Anthony, Bill Pearce's vocal ministry, which would last 30 years (at least one album is still available) Bill and Anthony would later become one of the first of a stable of artists to record for Word Records. (Word Records in Waco, Texas, was for many years the leading Christian music record label). He recorded not only with Dick Anthony, but also with another group, a quartet called "The Melody Four" which was also formed at WMBI, and also recorded for Word Records.

Bill Pearce also played multiple times with Kurt Kaiser. "Kurt Kaiser came playing piano through Chicago," he recalls. "He and I hooked up with my trombone and before I knew it we were recording 'head arrangements' for Word. Then things at Word really started shaking and Paul Mickelson and Ralph Carmichael were raising the level, using professional sidemen and before we knew it Word Records was paying our production fees. We were playing with name people, including members of the Chicago Symphony string section, lead trumpet Bobbie Lewis, Mark McDunn and studio players; John Haynor was playing bass trombone with us. Guys like this were playing backgrounds. We were just at the right place at the right time. I was working hard and new young arrangers came through with good ideas and we were doing albums with top musicians. It was just a gift of God with timing that put me in the middle of all this. I was the only one doing anything at Word in brass work at all apart from a guy in Detroit named Chuck Ohman who was a fine trumpeter whom I had worked with in Percy Crawford's days. I was just blowing bubbles, making 30 or 40 albums over the years – there were so many I lost count."

In between recording with Kurt Kaiser, the Melody Four & Pearce and Anthony, Pearce started a local radio program he called "Nightwatch." By 1970 the show was syndicated under the name "NightSounds" with an opening song of "Beau Soir", a Claude Debussy song arranged for orchestra and voice by Larry Mayfield. Pearce continued playing up to 1995. But later would be diagnosed with Parkinson's disease, complicating his ability to play.

== Death ==
Bill Pearce, died February 23, 2010, in Xenia, Ohio, from complications of Parkinson's disease. He was 83 at the time of his death.

== Discography ==
- Bill Pearce – Trombone, with the Dick Anthony Orchestra. Arrangements by Dick Anthony.
- The Remarkable Trombone of Bill Pearce. Arrangements by Kurt Kaiser. Word WST-8312-LP.
- A Quiet Place: The Rich Trombone of Bill Pearce. 1965. Arrangements by Kurt Kaiser. Word WST-8460-LP.
- Reach Out: Bill Pearce, Trombone. 1975. Arrangements by Larry Mayfield. Word WST-8663-LP.
- Son Of My Soul. 1975. (Vocal album) Arrangements by Larry Mayfield. Word WST-8662-LP. Out of print.
- This is Bill Pearce. Arrangements by Larry Mayfield. FourMost LP FM7121CS. Out of print.
- Bill Pearce, Trombone. 1979. Arrangements by Larry Mayfield. New Dawn ZLP 3103. Out of print.
- Bill Pearce. 1981. Arrangements by Larry Mayfield. New Dawn ZLP-3187. Out of print.
- Great Hymns of the Faith. Bill Pearce sings hymns and tells the stories behind them.
- Together Again LIVE!. Bill Pearce in concert with George Beverly Shea, and the Melody Four Quartet.
- What Wondrous Love. Bill Pearce, trombone and vocal (includes previously released material from out of print discs).
- In His Likeness. Bill Pearce, trombone and vocal (includes previously released material from out of print discs).
- The Gentle Touch. Bill Pearce and Dick Anthony, vocal duo (includes previously released material from out of print discs).
- Encore. Bill Pearce, trombone (includes previously released material from out of print discs).
- Bright and Beautiful. Bill Pearce, trombone and vocal. Arrangements by Otis Skillings.
- Learning to Lean. Bill Pearce, trombone and vocal.
- 16 Singing Men In Concert. Bill Pearce with the "16 Singing Men".
- Christmas In The Air. Bill Pearce, trombone and vocal (includes previously released material from out of print discs). Arrangements by John Innes and Larry Mayfield.
- Favorites. Bill Pearce, trombone and vocal (includes previously released material from out of print discs).
- Touch of Gold. Bill Pearce, trombone and vocal (includes previously released material from out of print discs). 50 selections spanning 50 years of trombone and radio broadcast ministry.
- Over the Sunset Mountain Bill Pearce and Dick Anthony. Vinyl LP, Word Records: W-3059. 1959.
- Moments of Melody. Bill Pearce and Dick Anthony vocal duo. Singtime Recordings, LPS 500. Van Kampen Press, Wheaton, IL, 1953.
