= Mr. Texas =

Mr. Texas may refer to:

- Hernandez (wrestler) (born 1973), American professional wrestler, also known as Mr. Texas
- Mr. Texas (film), a 1951 American western film
