= London Crusade (1954) =

Billy Graham's evangelistic campaign in London

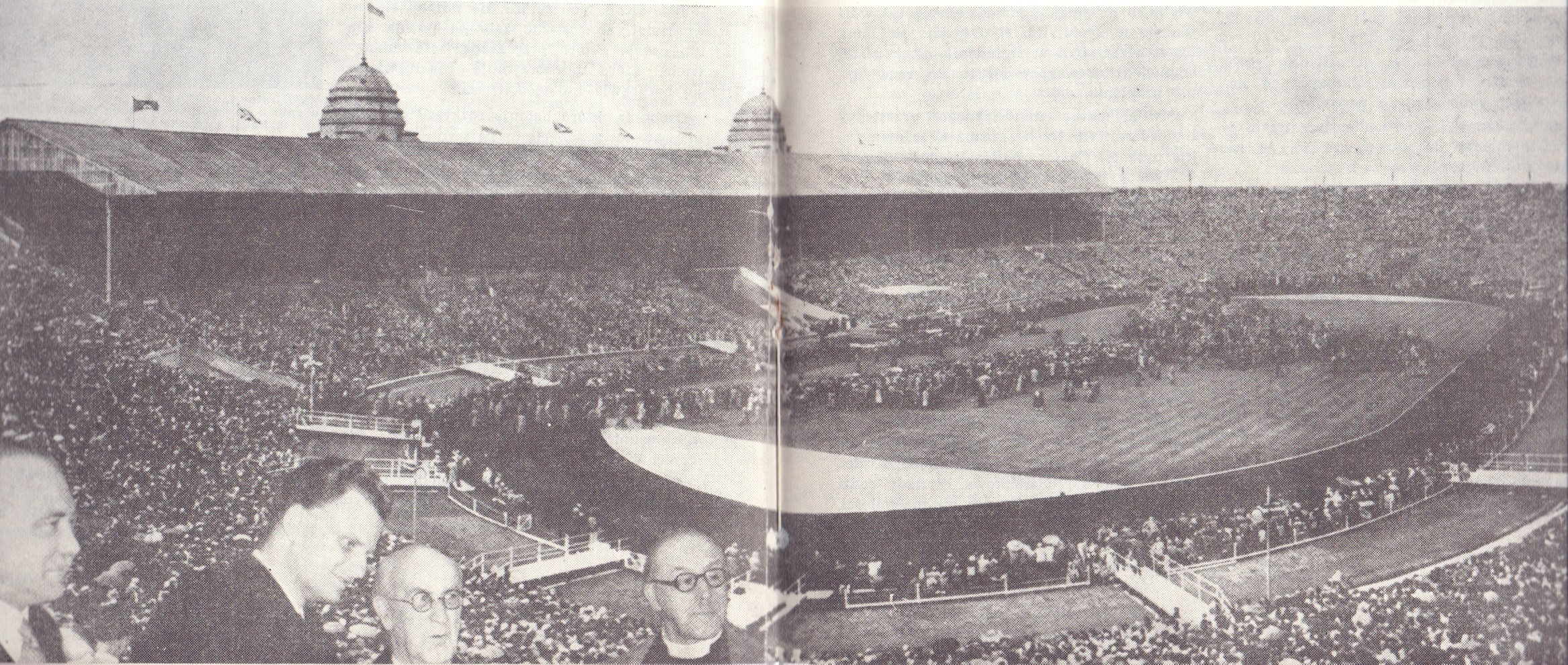
Final day of the crusade at Wembley

The London Crusade was the first major evangelistic campaign conducted by Billy Graham outside the United States. It took place in London in 1954 and ran for three months, from 1 March to 29 May. Most meetings were held at Harringay Arena, with one event in Hyde Park and another at Wembley Stadium. Approximately 2 million people attended. Among the notable attendees were the Archbishop of Canterbury, Geoffrey Francis Fisher, and British Prime Minister Winston Churchill.

== Preparations ==
Billy Graham visited the United Kingdom several times in the years following World War II, with these trips organized by the "Youth for Christ" movement. From October 1946 to March 1947, Graham, alongside his collaborator, musician Cliff Barrows, preached in 27 British cities across 360 small meetings. These early efforts lacked the scale and mass appeal that characterized Graham's later ministry. Preparations for a large-scale crusade in London began in 1952. At the time, England was a largely secularized nation, with only 10% of the population attending church.

Graham arrived at the invitation of the British Evangelical Alliance, which also co-sponsored the crusade. The invitation was extended in March 1952. However, representatives of the Anglican and Presbyterian churches declined to participate. Graham was likened to a film star, dubbed a "Hollywood version of John the Baptist" by some observers. Additionally, in the early 1950s, Britain harbored significant suspicion toward America and a distaste for the American style of gospel preaching.

The British press was initially hostile. The Daily Mirror greeted Graham as an unwelcome American export. William Conner, a columnist for the Daily Mirror writing under the pseudonym "Cassandra", warned readers that Graham would dictate "what we should think and believe". Critics accused him of preaching a "circus Gospel" outdated by 50 years.

One Anglican bishop predicted Graham would return to the US "like a whipped dog". Even some supporters urged him to conduct a smaller test run in England first, but Graham refused, asserting that "God doesn't need pilot tests". On 22 February 1954, a Labour Party MP declared in Parliament that the American evangelist was coming to meddle in British politics under the guise of religion. Hannen Swaffer, a columnist for the Daily Herald, highlighted a prayer calendar from Graham's association warning of secularism's dangers, while a crusade pamphlet substituted "socialism" for "secularism", (Note: The calendar, beneath an illustration of London, stated: "What Hitler's bombs could not do, secularism with its accompanying evils shortly accomplished". The pamphlet replaced "secularism" with "socialism" (Pollock (1966, p. 157)).) which was interpreted as an attack on the Labour Party and its 14 million supporters. London media demanded an apology. Graham explained it was a printing error, insisting "secularism" was intended, not "socialism".

== Events ==
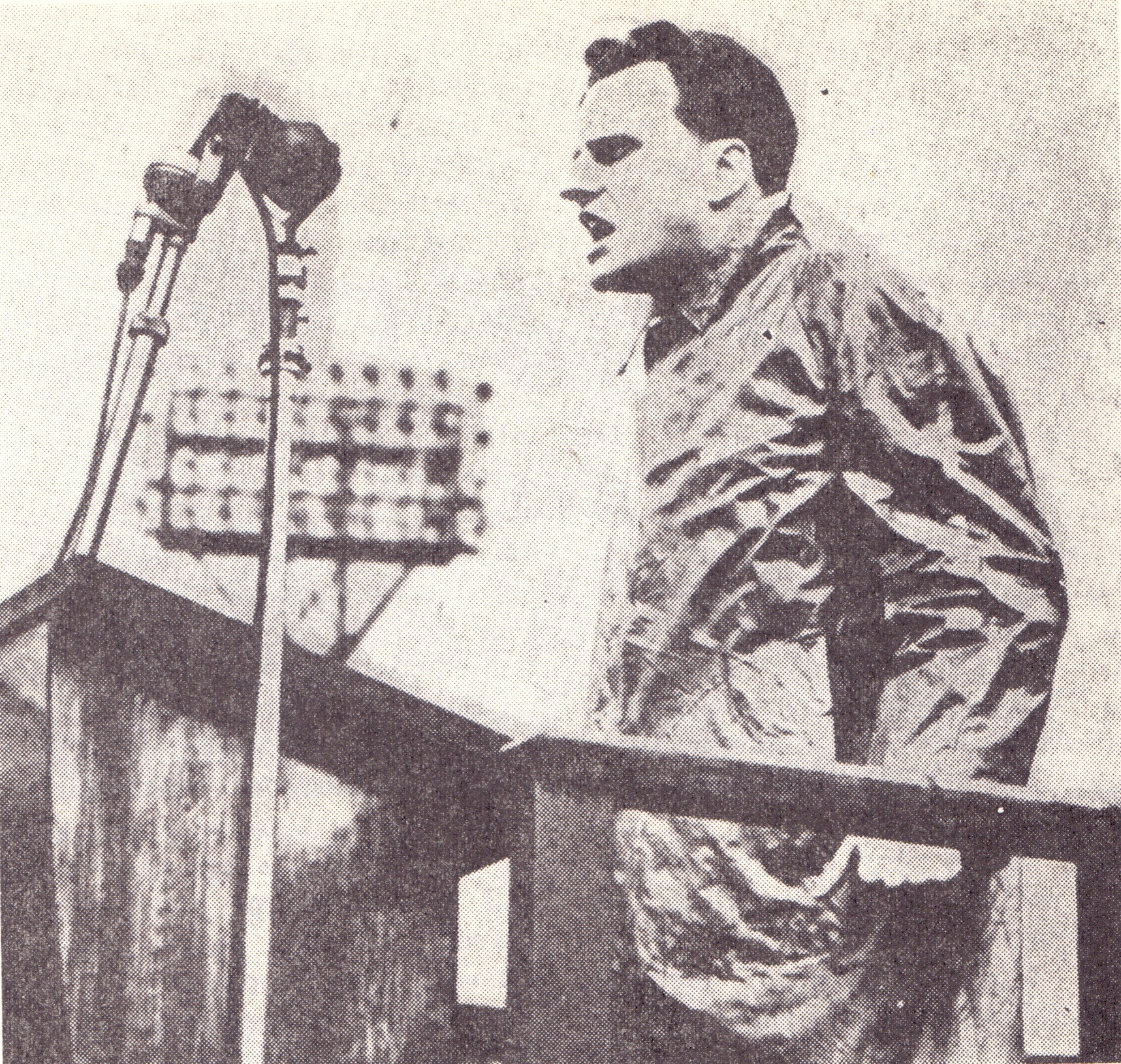
During a gathering in London

When Graham arrived at London Waterloo station on 22 February 1954, he was greeted by the largest crowd since 1924. Reporters immediately surrounded him, probing the political motives of his visit. Visibly agitated, he told them he believed he was there to revive England. He spent the next day in prayer, still unsettled. The first meeting at Harringay Arena drew only 2,000 attendees (the venue held 11,400), plus between 200 and 300 journalists, leaving Graham disheartened. However, by the second meeting, the arena was full, and subsequent evenings regularly drew over 12,000 people. On the first Saturday, between 30,000 and 35,000 stood outside, prompting organizers to schedule two meetings each weekend.

Initial negativity gave way to enthusiastic interest. Crowds flocked despite poor weather, the press turned favorable, and skepticism among church leaders softened – most notably with the Archbishop of Canterbury, though not the Archbishop of York. After Graham's BBC appearance, the crusade gained attention from French, Italian, and other European press. The Associated Press sent two daily reports, and United Press International assigned Eugene Patterson to cover it.

From 30 March, the crusade was relayed via wartime telephone lines, reaching Glasgow and other British locations. Graham's audience grew to 400,000, gathered in public halls and theaters. On 16 April, a special meeting in Hyde Park drew over 40,000 people, according to police estimates. As two planes traced a cross in the sky, Graham proclaimed, "God forbid that I should glory, save in the cross of our Lord Jesus Christ" (Galatians 6:14).

On 22 May, the final meeting at Wembley Stadium attracted 120,000 attendees, with an additional 67,000 at nearby White City Stadium. The Archbishop of Canterbury, Geoffrey Francis Fisher, was among the listeners. That evening, London's Evening News devoted its entire edition to Graham.

Winston Churchill attended two Harringay meetings and requested a meeting with Graham before the crusade's end. This took place on 24 May and lasted about 40 minutes. Churchill remarked, "I see no other hope for the future except the hope you speak of, young man. We must get back to God". Graham noted Churchill referenced a lack of hope nine times. (Note: When Graham noted Churchill once viewed the Bible as divinely inspired, Churchill replied, "Everything has changed tremendously. Look at these newspapers – filled with nothing but crime, wars, and the threat of communism. Do you realize that one day the world might be dominated by communism?" (Graham (2010, p. 279)).) Graham also met with the head of the Royal Navy and, in a pub called "John the Baptist's Head", reconciled with journalist William Conner ("Cassandra").

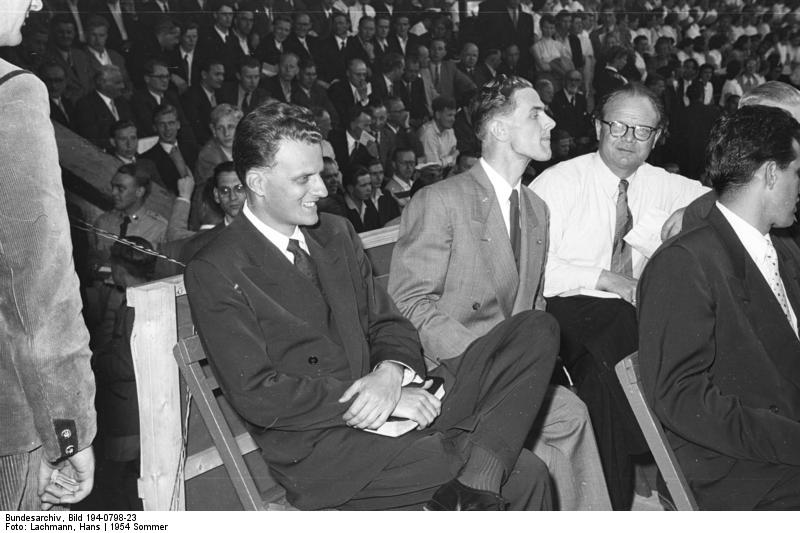
Graham in Düsseldorf

Before departing, Graham urged Britons to continue what God had begun in their country. The crusade cost £400,000, with over half funded by the Billy Graham Evangelistic Association. During the campaign, Graham and his team accepted half their usual salaries. Despite physical exhaustion – Graham lost over 7 kg (15 lbs) – he embarked on a European tour, visiting Amsterdam, Frankfurt, Düsseldorf, Berlin, Copenhagen, Paris, Stockholm, and Helsinki. In Amsterdam on 22 June, he spoke to 40,000, and in Berlin on 27 June, to 100,000.

== Aftermath ==
Over three months in London, about 2 million people heard Graham, with 40,000 professing faith in Christ. The success was pivotal for Graham, proving his message resonated beyond the US. Before London, he hesitated to target major American cities like New York, Chicago, and Philadelphia. The crusade gave him confidence that if it succeeded in London, it could anywhere. However, journalist Stanley High of Reader's Digest found that 72% of converts were already religiously engaged.

Graham fostered prayer and evangelistic cooperation among Protestant churches, though not doctrinal unity. Biographer Pollock suggested a longer stay, akin to Dwight L. Moody's 1874–1875 campaign, might have deepened this unity. By late 1954, BGEA established a London office. That winter, inspired by the crusade, two films emerged: the documentary London Crusade and Souls in Conflict, featuring conversion stories, including actress Joan Winmill's.

The Church of England was the primary beneficiary. Robert Ferm reported that for 12 years after the crusade, Oak Hill College students frequently cited Harringay as their conversion point. In 1966, Graham noted 52 Anglican clergy who converted at Harringay sat with him one evening. Methodists and Baptists also benefited; Baptist baptisms rose from 5,000 annually between 1954 and 1955 to 7,000 between 1956 and 1957 before stabilizing, though membership remained steady. The crusade strengthened the evangelical wing of the Anglican Church.

Evangelical churches, however, were disappointed. In 1963, when BGEA's Maurice Robinson proposed another Graham crusade, the Evangelical Alliance declined. In May 1955, Graham held a seven-day crusade at Wembley Stadium, an unprecedented repeat in one city. Each night drew between 50,000 and 60,000 people, though poor weather and an election campaign dampened press interest. (Note: A minor sensation involved actor John French, who, upset over Joan Winmill's conversion, confronted Graham but converted and later became a missionary (Pollock (1966, p. 202)).) The final night saw 80,000 attendees, yet many organizers felt it paled compared to 1954, despite 400,000 total attendees. (Note: London's Evening News claimed no event had drawn so many to hear God's word in one week (High (1956, p. 230)).)

== Reception ==
The London Daily Mail wrote, "Graham is not a magician, magnetic, or emotional. His power – and he has power – lies in his unshakable conviction that he knows the right way of life". The left-leaning, Christianity-skeptical New Statesman observed that people discussed religion freely, more casually than seemed proper.

Hugh Gough, Bishop of Barking, told an Anglican clergy conference in January 1955, "It is evident we are witnessing the beginning of another evangelical awakening in this country". In spring 1955, G. K. A. Bell, Bishop of Chichester and an ecumenical activist, told journalist Stanley High that Graham had left a lasting impact on the spirituality of his country and that England had been expecting it. Many people from his diocese, both clergy and laity, had been uplifted by the message preached "with power and authority". However, when Billy Graham organized a seven-day crusade at Wembley Stadium in May 1955, none of the "great dignitaries" of the church attended. Bishop Gough, in 1964, also gave a positive assessment of the Wembley crusade of 1955.

In early 1956, Michael Ramsey, Archbishop of York, published The Menace of Fundamentalism in his diocesan magazine, accusing Graham of sectarianism and heresy. Many observers likened Graham's impact to Dwight L. Moody's 19th-century revivals or even John Wesley's. Graham attributed his success to a spiritual hunger unrecognized by church leaders, marking a new era of transatlantic evangelicalism and forcing British evangelicalism to redefine itself.

In 1959, Bishop Hugh Gough reflected on Graham's UK crusades, lamenting that Britons missed God's call. "Many in the church doubted or resisted, and I fear we must say of this country – 'You did not recognize the time of your visitation'" (Luke 19:44).

== See also ==
- List of Billy Graham's crusades
- Los Angeles Crusade (1949)
- New York Crusade (1957)

== Bibliography ==
- High, Stanley (1956). Billy Graham: The Personal Story Of The Man, His Message And His Mission. New York: McGraw-Hill Book Company.
- Pollock, John (1966). The Billy Graham Story: The Authorized Biography. London: Hodder and Stoughton.
- Graham, Billy (2010). "Przełom w Wielkiej Brytanii" [Breakthrough in Britain]. Taki, jaki jestem [Just As I Am] (in Polish). Translated by J. Marcol. Theologos. ISBN 978-83-927002-5-8.
