= Dick Anthony (musician) =

American musician (1932–2019)

Dick Anthony in 1963

Richard Vernon Anthony Anthony (December 8, 1932 – December 20, 2019) was an American musician who composed, conducted, produced, sang and performed sacred music.

== Background and personal life ==
Richard Vernon Anthony was born in Waukegan, Illinois, the second of five sons of Joseph and Ruth Anthony. (Note: His brother is the entertainer Al Anthony.) He was born into a Baptist family which was very involved with religious music. His aunt was the organist for the Waukegan church his family attended and both of his parents were members of the church choir. He began studying music at age seven; his parents hoped he would be able to play for church services. He graduated in 1949 from Waukegan Township High School, attended Bethel College, St. Paul, Minnesota, and majored in vocal performance at American Conservatory of Music, Chicago. Anthony served in the U.S. Navy as a chaplain's assistant. He was assigned to the aircraft carrier USS Forrestal; during his time on the carrier, Anthony organized and led a large choral group. Anthony, a baritone, is also a pianist and organist.

Anthony married Dorothy Bartlett, a harpist and educator in 1954. Dick and Dorothy had three children, Karyn, Scott and Cheryl.

Dick Anthony died in Fort Worth, Texas on December 20, 2019, at the age of 87.

== Career ==
=== Radio and television ===
Bill Pearce (left) and Dick Anthony circa 1959

Anthony worked as a radio presenter with Jack Wyrtzen's "Word of Life" radio broadcasts and "Songtime" weekly show on the ABC television network from New York City. Anthony did not begin singing professionally until he became the arranger for the quartet who performed on the Word of Life. He joined the staff of Chicago radio station WMBI in 1952, performing about 25 broadcasts each week. He worked with gospel songwriter John W. Peterson on a daily radio program called "Cheer Up. Anthony also appeared on "The Songsters" and "Keep Praising" at WMBI. Anthony frequently performed duets with singer Bill Pearce on broadcasts, recordings and live concerts. Anthony and Pearce met when both worked at WMBI Radio; Pearce was also a member of WMBI's "The Melody Four" quartet. Both Anthony and Pearce also performed as members of "16 Singing Men". (Note: The chorale group performed and recorded under other various names: The Choristers, Dick Anthony's Singing Men, the Radio Bible Class Men of Music and Billy Graham's Hour of Decision Crusader Men, among them.)

In 1963 Anthony left WMBI and moved his family to Long Beach, California to direct music at the First Baptist Church of Lakewood. There they expanded the music program from a single choir to ten choirs involving 500 singers and musicians. Anthony left Long Beach in 1967 for an opportunity to work with the newly established television department of "Radio Bible Class". Anthony became the executive producer and musical director for the "Day of Discovery", a nationally syndicated television series, and for the "Radio Bible Class" ministry with Richard DeHaan. The telecasts originated first from St. Petersburg, Florida and later from Winter Haven, Florida. The radio broadcasts came from Grand Rapids, Michigan. In 1983 Anthony produced a television series called " Praise Song" for the Southern Baptist Radio and TV Commission. It consisted of various musicians (including 16 Singing Men, Bruce McCoy and Kim Boyce) performing Christian songs in unusual settings. It was broadcast on the ACTS TV network.

=== Composing, producing, arranging and conducting ===
Anthony was arranger, accompanist and orchestral conductor for other musicians and for several albums with "The Melody Four" quartet. He organized, arranged and conducted about a dozen albums with "16 Singing Men" for Word Records and Zondervan Records. In all, in recording studios in Chicago, Hollywood and London, he produced more than 100 Christian music albums. Anthony published more than 30 collections of original compositions and arrangements for various vocal and instrumental groups, including four cantatas and a youth musical.

Anthony received many offers to work with non-religious music, but was not interested as he preferred to work solely with religious music. He had no bias against secular music and often arranged and composed his religious music with an ear toward popular music as he saw it as a way to reach people. In 1965, he opened Anthony Publishing Company/Anthony Music in Long Beach, which published both religious music and books about it.

=== Performing ===
Anthony performed in concert, first with Bill Pearce, "The Melody Four" and "16 Singing Men", and, in later years, with his wife and family. He performed internationally with Lareau Lindquist and the mission organization "Barnabas International", including at Carnegie Hall and Chicago's Orchestra Hall. At Royal Albert Hall he was guest soloist and conductor of a 1000 voice choir. Anthony also performed regularly on a Sunday music program of BBC Radio. He has also performed in remote locations in South America and Africa. From 1985 to 1995, he was artist-in-residence at Northwestern College in St. Paul Minnesota, performing daily radio programs on the college's 10 radio stations as well as lecturing and tutoring on musical composition, arranging and piano improvisation. During the summers of 1987-93 Anthony directed music sessions and conducted evening concerts for the Maranatha Bible and Missionary Conference in Muskegon, Michigan.

== Retirement and recognition ==
In 1995 Anthony retired to Fort Worth, Texas where he served for 14 years as organist at Birchman Baptist Church. In 2015, Anthony was recognized for his years of work with Moody Radio with a Media Award from the National Religious Broadcasters.

== Discography ==
- Dick Anthony & Bill Pearce - Sword SS-2428 - 1954
- Dick Anthony & Bill Pearce -In the Garden - Singtime 1001 -1954
- Bill Pearce & Dick Anthony - Moments of Melody - Bibletone BL-0500 - 1955
- Bill Pearce & Dick Anthony - Moments of Melody - Bibletone BL-5002 - 1957
- Dick Anthony & Bill Pearce - Word Records W-3012 - 1957
- Dick Anthony - My Song - Word WST-8009 - 1959
- Dick Anthony - No Greater Love - Bibletone BL-8009 - 1959
- Sixteen Sing Men - Songs That Touch The Heart - Zondervan ZLP-0534 - 1959
- Bill Pearce & Dick Anthony - Over The Sunset Mountains - Word WST-8004 - 1959
- Bill Pearce & Dick Anthony - Pinnacle of Praise - Word WST8015 - 1959
- Bill Pearce & Dick Anthony - Rest of the Way - Word Records - WST-8409 - 1959
- Dick Anthony/Jerry Barns - Hymnbook Vol.1 - Word ALS-2007 - 1960
- Dick Anthony Choristers - Reflections - Word W-3089 - 1960
- Sixteen Sing Men - Wonderful Peace Vol. 3 - Zondervan ZLP-0575 - 1960
- Sixteen Sing Men - Wonderful Peace Vol. 3 - SESAC R-2104 - 1960
- Bill Pearce & Dick Anthony - Hymnbook Vol.1 - Word ALS-201 - 1960
- Dick Anthony Choristers - Solitude -Word WST-8060 - 1961
- Sixteen Sing Men - Over The Sunset Mountains - SESAC R-2102 - 1962
- Bill Pearce & Dick Anthony - Bill And Dick - Word Records WST-8105 - 1962
- Sixteen Sing Men - Rock of Ages Cleft For Even Me - Zondervan ZLP-0614 - 1963
- Dick Anthony - Keyboard Musings - Zondervan ZLP-0622 - 1963
- Dick Anthony - Light Out of Darkness - Hosanna L-201
- Dick Anthony - Sacred Symphony of London - Zondervan ZLP-0617 - 1963
- Talley, Joe and Marion - Handfuls of Music - Word WST-8128 - 1963
- Talley, Joe and Marion - In The Spotlight - Word WST-8037 - 1963
- Jeanette York - Songs From My Heart - Zondervan ZLP-0562 - 1963
- Sixteen Sing Men - 16 Singing Men - Vol. 6 - Zondervan ZLP-0646 - 1964
- Men of Music - Radio Bible Class - Singcord ZLP-0863 - 1964
- Dick Anthony - To Tell The Untold - Hosanna L-202 - 1965
- Dick Anthony - Horizons in Harmony - Word WST-8372 - 1966
- Dick Anthony Singing Men - Dick Anthony's Singing Men - Word WST-8335 - 1966
- Dick Anthony Singing Men - God of Our Fathers - Word WST-8705 - 1966
- Dick Anthony Singing Men - Dick Anthony's Singing Men - Word WST-8335 - 1966
- Aunt Theresa - Old Testament Heroes - Word W-3229 - 1966
- Dick Anthony Singing Men - Just A Little While - SWORD SS-2419 - 1966
- Dick Anthony - Let Your Light So Shine - Word WST-8390 - 1967
- Sixteen Sing Men - 16 Singing Men - Vol. 7 - Zondervan ZLP-0666 - 1967
- Dick Anthony Singing Men - The Old Rugged Cross - Word WST-8399 - 1967
- Sixteen Sing Men - A Better Man - Good Life GLP-312 - 1968
- Men of Music - Men of Music - Vol. 1 - Word WST-8573 - 1969
- Men of Music - Men of Music - Vol. 2 - Word WST-8512 - 1969
- Bill Pearce & Dick Anthony - The Best of Pearce and Anthony - Word WST-8587 - 1972
- Ray Felton & Clair Hess Sing Duets - I Want You To Know - Singcord ZLP-0837 - 1972
- Bill Pearce & Dick Anthony - The Best of Pearce and Anthony - Word WST-8587 - 1972
- Dick Anthony Family - More Out of Life - Angellus WR-5099 - 1975
- Dick Anthony - Sweet, Sweet Spirit - Rainbow LPS-5034 - 1977
- Dick Anthony & Bill O'Brien - Harvest Tempo R-7189 - 1977
- Sixteen Sing Men - Carols of Christmas - Zondervan ZLP-0575 - 1972
- Dick Anthony Family - Dick Anthony Family - Rainbow R-2436 - 1984
- Dick Anthony Family - Instruments of Praise - Rainbow R-2651 - 1987
