= Mr. Texas (film) =

1951 film

- Directed by: Dick Ross (director)
- Written by: Kenneth Perkins
- Produced by: World Wide Pictures
- Starring: Redd Harper; Cindy Walker
- Release date: October 2, 1951
- Running time: 65 minutes
- Country: United States
- Language: English

Mr. Texas is a 1951 American Western film directed by Dick Ross, starring Redd Harper and Cindy Walker. The film's producer, evangelist Billy Graham called it "the first Christian Western".

== Cast ==
- Redd Harper as Jim Tyler
- Cindy Walker as Kay
- Billy Graham as himself
- Cliff Barrows
- Grade Wilson
- Jerry Beavan
- George Beverly Shea
- Paul Mickelson
- Tedd Smith
