= Hour of Decision (radio program) =

Former Radio Broadcast

- Running time: 30 minutes
- Country of origin: United States
- Language: English
- Syndicates: Billy Graham Evangelistic Association
- Original release: 1950 – December 22, 2016
- Website: billygraham.org

The Hour of Decision was a live weekly radio (and later television) broadcast produced by the Billy Graham Evangelistic Association. First broadcast on radio in 1950 by the American Broadcasting Company, it was a half-hour program featuring sermons from noted evangelist Billy Graham and hosted by Cliff Barrows, a very close friend of Graham and the long-time musical director and MC of Billy Graham's Crusades. The televised Sunday night version began on September 30, 1951 on ABC and ran until February 28, 1954.

On May 4, 2014, host Cliff Barrows joined a new weekly online-only show, Hour of Decision Online, alongside Bob Souer as co-host. The existing Hour of Decision radio program was renamed Peace With God, hosted by Bill Maier. However, Peace With God ended shortly after, with the final broadcast airing on February 22, 2015. Hour of Decision Online ended after Barrows' death in 2016.

== History ==
The origins of Hour of Decision was recounted in Billy Graham's autobiography, Just As I Am. Holding a Crusade (his evangelistical events) in Portland, Oregon, at the persistence of two men who wanted him to start a radio program he joked that if he could raise the $25,000 necessary by midnight that night (nearly $250,000 in 2015) he would be willing to do it. This was despite his reluctance, feeling he did not have the time to commit to one. Announcing the ambitious goal at the Crusade that evening, by the end of the meeting $24,000 of the necessary funds had been donated for the radio broadcast. Returning to his hotel room that night, he found two $500 donations awaiting - both for the new radio ministry.

"Stunned, I bowed my head and said a silent prayer. Emotion so overcame me that I could not think straight. Clearly, these funds had come from God.", writes Billy Graham in his autobiography. Soon after, a nationwide broadcasting contract was signed and work began on the radio ministry. This was also the start of what became known as the Billy Graham Evangelistic Association, the umbrella organization under which all of Billy Graham's work was to be done. The first Hour of Decision broadcast, titled Revival, was broadcast live for 30 minutes on 150 stations across the United States of America from a Crusade in Atlanta, Georgia, by the American Broadcasting Company. As of 2010, the Hour of Decision programme was syndicated across 581 radio stations in the United States, as well as over 400 radio stations across the world. The programme was aired in five different languages (English, Mandarin, Spanish, French and Persian) across 55 countries in all six continents worldwide.

From 1950 until 2014, Billy Graham's Crusade musical director and MC Cliff Barrows hosted the radio program before transitioning to become the host of the new online-only program Hour of Decision Online (alongside Bob Souer) on May 4, 2014. The existing radio program Hour of Decision was re-branded to become Peace With God, with Bill Maier taking over as host. It was a 26-minute program featuring sermons from Billy Graham, Franklin Graham or Will Graham. However, that program ended shortly after, with the final broadcast, Time To Come Home (featuring Billy Graham's message from a 1992 Crusade in Portland, Oregon) airing on February 22, 2015.

== Hour of Decision Online ==
The current Hour of Decision Online program is between 30–45 minutes long, with each focusing on a particular Crusade. New episodes are released every Sunday on the Billy Graham Evangelistic Association's website, at hourofdecisiononline.org. It can also be accessed via the Billy Graham Evangelistic Association's official app, available on the App Store or Google Play. Episodes can be downloaded for offline listening.

It usually begins with one or two musical items - often from George Beverly Shea, the Crusade Choirs or other musical guests such as Larnelle Harris - and a testimony of faith from a guest at that Crusade. Co-host Cliff Barrows shares some insights and stories from that Crusade. That is then followed by a 15–25-minute sermon from Billy Graham, with a short message in between which advertises the work of the Billy Graham Evangelistic Association. The message is followed by Cliff Barrows leading listeners in the sinner's prayer before a short encouraging message from Anne Graham Lotz, Billy Graham's daughter. To end, Cliff then shares a story from his personal life related to the message.

As of August 2014, the new online-only program has received views from 50 countries on all six continents. According to the Billy Graham Evangelistic Association, the new non-live, online format "eliminates the strict time constraints of live radio and allows for more stories, more music and more time to share the Gospel - three things that bring delight to the hosts and the listeners."

Billy Graham's longtime music director and crusade MC Cliff Barrows, who hosted the weekly Hour of Decision, died November 15, 2016, at the age of 93. The online program continued just six more weeks with the final program released on December 22. For 66 years, the Hour of Decision brought the music and messages from Billy Graham crusades to listeners throughout the world. During crusade weeks, the Sunday broadcast would often contain portions of the Friday evening service, just two days old. That was before the days when radio stations received individual tapes, cassettes or CDs; back when the program aired on the Mutual and/or ABC Networks and stations aired the broadcast feeds live or taped them for later release.
