= The Strawberry Roan =

1948 film by John English

- Theatrical release poster
- Directed by: John English
- Screenplay by: Dwight Cummins; Dorothy Yost
- Story by: Julian Zimet
- Produced by: Armand Schaefer
- Starring: Gene Autry; Gloria Henry; Jack Holt; Dickie Jones; Pat Buttram
- Cinematography: Fred Jackman Jr.
- Edited by: Henry Batista
- Music by: Mischa Bakaleinikoff (uncredited)
- Production company: Gene Autry Productions
- Distributed by: Columbia Pictures
- Release date: August 1, 1948
- Running time: 79 minutes
- Country: United States
- Language: English

The Strawberry Roan is a 1948 American western drama film directed by John English and starring Gene Autry, Gloria Henry and Jack Holt. It was distributed by Columbia Pictures. It was the first of two Autry Columbia films shot in Cinecolor, it was followed by The Big Sombrero.

== Plot ==
Joe is paralyzed by a wild horse, a strawberry roan. His father, Walt, tries to kill the horse in anger but is unsuccessful and the horse escapes. Autry, who stopped Walt from killing the animal, is asked to leave the ranch. He finds the horse and trains it in the hopes of returning it to Joe to give him the will to overcome his disability.

== Cast ==
- Gene Autry as Gene Autry
- Gloria Henry as Connie Bailey
- Jack Holt as Walt Bailey
- Dickie Jones as Joe Bailey
- Pat Buttram as Hank
- Rufe Davis as Chuck
- John McGuire as Bud Williams
- Eddy Waller as Steve
- Redd Harper as Andy
- Champion as Champ, the Strawberry Roan

== Production ==
=== Stuntwork ===
- Ted Mapes
- Eddie Parker

=== Filming locations ===
- Santa Clarita, California, USA
- Andy Jauregui Ranch, Placerita Canyon Road, Newhall, California, USA
- Sedona, Arizona, USA

=== Soundtrack ===
- "The Strawberry Roan" (Curley Fletcher) by Gene Autry
- "Texas Sandman" (Allan Roberts, Doris Fisher) by Gene Autry
- "The Angel Song (When the Angels turn the lights on in Heaven)" (Gene Austin, Curt Massey, Mary Millard) by Gene Autry
- "Can't Shake the Sands of Texas From My Shoes" (Gene Austin, Kenneth Pitts, Diane Johnston) by Gene Autry
- "When the White Roses Bloom in Red River Valley" by Gene Autry

== See also ==
- List of films about horses
