= Wiretapper =

1955 film

- Directed by: Dick Ross
- Written by: Jim Vaus Jr. John O'Dea
- Produced by: J.D. Kendis
- Starring: Bill Williams; Georgia Lee; Douglas Kennedy
- Cinematography: Ralph Woolsey
- Edited by: Eugene Pendleton
- Music by: Ralph Carmichael
- Production company: Great Commission Films
- Distributed by: Continental Pictures
- Release date: August 10, 1955
- Running time: 80 minutes
- Country: United States
- Language: English

Wiretapper is a 1955 American biographical crime drama film directed by Dick Ross, written by John O'Dea, and starring Bill Williams, Georgia Lee and Douglas Kennedy. The scenario of the film was based on the true story of Jim Vaus Jr. The score was composed by Ralph Carmichael.

== Plot ==
Jim Vaus returns from the war and marries Alice. He struggles to make a living. He was hired by Charles Rumsden to fix a doorbell, and realizes that his client is a mob boss. Alice discovers the source of Jim's income and their relationship was expired and strained to the breaking point. She forces Jim to attend a Billy Graham's Los Angeles Crusade, in her attempt to save their marriage and Jim's soul.

== Cast ==
- Bill Williams as Jim Vaus Jr.
- Georgia Lee as Alice Park Vaus
- Douglas Kennedy as Charles Rumsden
- Phil Tead as Mr. Wiggins – Postman
- Stanley Clements as Tony
- Ric Roman as Nick Castro
- Richard Benedict as Romato
- Paul Picerni as Herbie
- Steve Conte as Henchman
- Melinda Plowman as Helen Park – Kid Sister
- Billy Graham as himself (uncredited)

== Scenario ==
During the late 1940s, Jim Vaus Jr. worked for the police and for mobster Mickey Cohen. The story of Jim Vaus was described in magazines: Time, Life and Reader’s Digest. Jim Vaus described his own story in his autobiography Why I Quit Syndicated Crime (1951). This autobiography was used by John O'Dea for a film scenario. In 2007 Will Vaus, son of Jim, published book My Father Was a Gangster.

== See also ==
- List of Billy Graham's crusades
