= Cindy Walker =

American songwriter, singer (1917–2006)

Background information
- Born: July 20, 1917; Mart, Texas, U.S.
- Died: March 23, 2006 (aged 88) Mexia, Texas, U.S.
- Genre: Country
- Occupations: Songwriter, singer, dancer

Cindy Walker (July 20, 1917 – March 23, 2006) was an American songwriter, country music singer, and dancer. She wrote many popular and enduring songs recorded by many artists.

She adopted a craftsman-like approach to her songwriting, often tailoring particular songs to specific artists. She produced a body of over 650 songs that have been described as “direct, honest, and unpretentious”. She had top-10 hits spread over five decades. She was inducted into the Country Music Hall of Fame in 1997, and the Texas Heritage Songwriters Hall of Fame in March 2011.

== Early life ==
Lucille Eiland Walker, who in 1940 changed her name to "Cindy Walker," was born on July 20, 1917, on her grandparents' farm three miles north of Mart, Texas (near Mexia, about 20 miles east of Waco), the daughter of cotton broker Aubrey Walker. Her maternal grandfather, Franklin Lycurgus Eiland (1860-1909), was a noted composer of hymns. Her mother Oree Walker (1899-1991) was a fine pianist and Cindy's lifelong musical collaborator and business partner. From childhood, Cindy was fond of poetry and wrote habitually. Beginning at age 5 she gained recognition for her singing and dancing abilities.

== Career ==
=== Beginnings ===
Throughout the 1930s, Walker sang and danced in stage shows across Texas and beyond. As a teenager, Walker wrote dozens of songs, many of which remained unpublished until the early 1940s. Among these early compositions, her song "Dusty Skies" was inspired by newspaper accounts of the dust storms on the American prairies in the mid-1930s, and later became a hit for Bob Wills and the Texas Playboys. In 1936, her song "Casa de Mañana" was performed by the Paul Whiteman Orchestra on a national radio broadcast as part of the Texas Frontier Centennial celebration in Fort Worth.

=== Move to Los Angeles ===
In early 1940, Walker, at the age of 22, accompanied her parents on a business trip to Los Angeles. As they were driving down Sunset Boulevard, she asked her father to stop the car near the Bing Crosby Enterprises building. Walker later recalled: "I had decided that if I ever got to Hollywood, I was going to try to show Bing Crosby a song I had written for him called 'Lone Star Trail'". Her father said, "You're crazy, girl", but nonetheless stopped the car. Walker went inside the building to pitch her song and emerged shortly afterward to ask her mother to play the piano for her. Bing Crosby's brother, Larry Crosby, had agreed to listen to the song; Walker sang “Lone Star Trail” to him, accompanied by her mother. Larry Crosby was impressed and aware that his brother was looking for a new Western song to record. The next day, Cindy played guitar and sang “Lone Star Trail” for Bing Crosby at Universal Studios where he was making a movie. Crosby arranged for her to record a demonstration with Dave Kapp of Decca Records, who was also impressed and offered her a recording contract. "Lone Star Trail" was recorded and became a top-ten hit for Bing Crosby in early 1941.

=== Performances and recordings ===
Walker remained in Los Angeles for 13 years, appearing in films, performing on stage and on the radio, and writing songs for country and western artists. In 1940, she sang her song "Hill Billy Bill" in the Universal musical short "Swingin' in the Barn," and later appeared as a singer in the Gene Autry Western Ride, Tenderfoot, Ride. Walker provided lead vocals for three songs (released as sides of three records) recorded by Texas Jim Lewis and His Lone Star Cowboys, the first of which was “Seven Beers with the Wrong Man” (1940), a song featured in the first of her dozen "Soundies" (a precursor to music videos, presented in large coin-operated video juke boxes). In 1944, Walker's highest-charting record, "When My Blue Moon Turns to Gold Again,” (not written by her) was a top-ten hit. In 1964, she recorded and released her only long-play album, "Words and Music," featuring twelve of her songs.

=== Focus on songwriting ===
Beginning in July 1941, Walker successfully pitched her songs to Bob Wills and began to regularly contribute compositions for recordings and the movies that Wills made in the 1940s. The collaboration was extremely fruitful. Bob Wills and the Texas Playboys eventually recorded over 50 of Cindy Walker's songs, including "Cherokee Maiden" (1941), "Dusty Skies" (1941), "Miss Molly" (1942), "Sugar Moon" (co-written with Bob Wills; 1947) and "Bubbles in My Beer" (1948). Bob Wills and his band performed Walker's first top-10 country hit, “You're From Texas” (1944).

Among her other 1940s hits were "Triflin' Gal" (top-10 records for both Al Dexter and Walter Shrum, 1945); "Warm Red Wine" (Ernest Tubb, 1949), and "Take Me in Your Arms and Hold Me" (Eddy Arnold, 1950). Some sources have erroneously attributed Johnny Bond's 1948 "Oklahoma Waltz" to her; probably confusing it with her own 1947 composition of that name, co-written with and recorded by Spade Cooley.

During the 1950s, Walker continued her success as a writer of popular songs. In 1952, Hank Snow had a hit with her "The Gold Rush Is Over", and in 1955, Webb Pierce had success with "I Don't Care".

Another Walker song was "Blue Canadian Rockies" recorded by Gene Autry (which featured in Autry's 1952 movie of the same name). The song was revived in 1968 by The Byrds on their influential country-rock album Sweetheart of the Rodeo. In 1955, Eddy Arnold pitched Walker the theme and the song title for "You Don't Know Me" when they met during a WSM deejay convention in Nashville. Walker then wrote the song based on Arnold's idea, with both receiving songwriting credit for their contributions. It has been described as “a beautifully symmetrical and poignant portrait of a love not to be”.

"You Don't Know Me" has been recorded by numerous artists over the years, most successfully by Jerry Vale (1956), Lenny Welch (1960), Ray Charles (1962), and Elvis Presley (1967). "Anna Marie" was a hit for Jim Reeves in 1957 and the beginning of another productive artist-writer association, which culminated in "This is It" (1965) and "Distant Drums" (a posthumous hit for Reeves). "Distant Drums" remained at number one on the British charts for five weeks in 1966.

Reeves recorded many of Walker's compositions; she often wrote specifically for him and offered him the right of first refusal of her tracks. "Distant Drums" was originally recorded by Reeves as a demonstration, simply because he loved the song. Chet Atkins felt the time was not right for an international release. This demo, like many for Reeves, was unearthed upon his death and along with Atkins and Mary Reeves, Walker oversaw the production of the overdub, which was to be released in 1966, and became a huge international hit.

In 1961, Eddy Arnold had a minor hit with Walker's "Jim, I Wore a Tie Today", a moving song about the death of a cowboy. Walker also wrote the song "Dream Baby (How Long Must I Dream)", which was recorded by Roy Orbison (who also recorded a version of "Distant Drums"). She originally had little confidence in “Dream Baby”, but Orbison's recording was a hit in both the US and Britain in 1962, and was a hit again in 1971 for Glen Campbell and in 1983 for Lacy J. Dalton. In 1964 Fred Foster of Monument Records "tempted her back into the studio to record an album, Words and Music by Cindy Walker. Walker's song "In the Misty Moonlight" was a hit for both Jerry Wallace (1964) and Dean Martin (1967), as well as being recorded by Jim Reeves. "Heaven Says Hello" (recorded by Sonny James) and "You Are My Treasure" (Jack Greene) were hits in 1968, both written by Walker.

== Honors, awards and tributes ==
In 1970, Walker became a charter member of the Nashville Songwriters Hall of Fame. In 1981, Mickey Gilley's version of "You Don't Know Me" was a hit in the country charts. A year later, Walker had her last major hit with Ricky Skaggs’ reworking of "I Don't Care".

An estimated 500 of Walker's songs have been recorded and her songs made the top-40 charts (country or pop) more than 400 times. In September 1997, Walker was inducted into the Country Music Hall of Fame (together with another songwriter, Harlan Howard). During her acceptance speech, Walker recited some verse she had written for the occasion:

In the 1980s, my mother bought me a dress for a BMI affair and she said “when they put you in the Hall of Fame, that's the dress I want you to wear.” And I said, “Oh Mama, the Hall of Fame? Why that will never be.” And the years went by, but my mother's words remained in my memory. And I know tonight she'd be happy, though she's gone now to her rest. But I think of all that she did for me, and tonight I'm wearing this dress.

Her speech was followed by a standing ovation, and Walker left the stage in tears after softly blowing a kiss. During the proceedings, renowned songwriter (and fellow Hall of Fame inductee) Harlan Howard described Walker as "the greatest living songwriter of country music".

In 1998, Walker was inducted into the Texas Country Music Hall of Fame. In 2002, the Country Music Television network honored the 40 Greatest Women in Country Music. The women were selected for their contribution to the genre by a survey of hundreds of American artists and music historians, and Walker was ranked number 32.

In March 2006, Willie Nelson released You Don't Know Me: The Songs of Cindy Walker, an album featuring 13 of Walker's well-known songs.

Cindy was posthumously inducted into the Texas Heritage Songwriters Hall of Fame in 2011 and into the National Songwriters Hall of Fame in 2024.

== Personal life ==
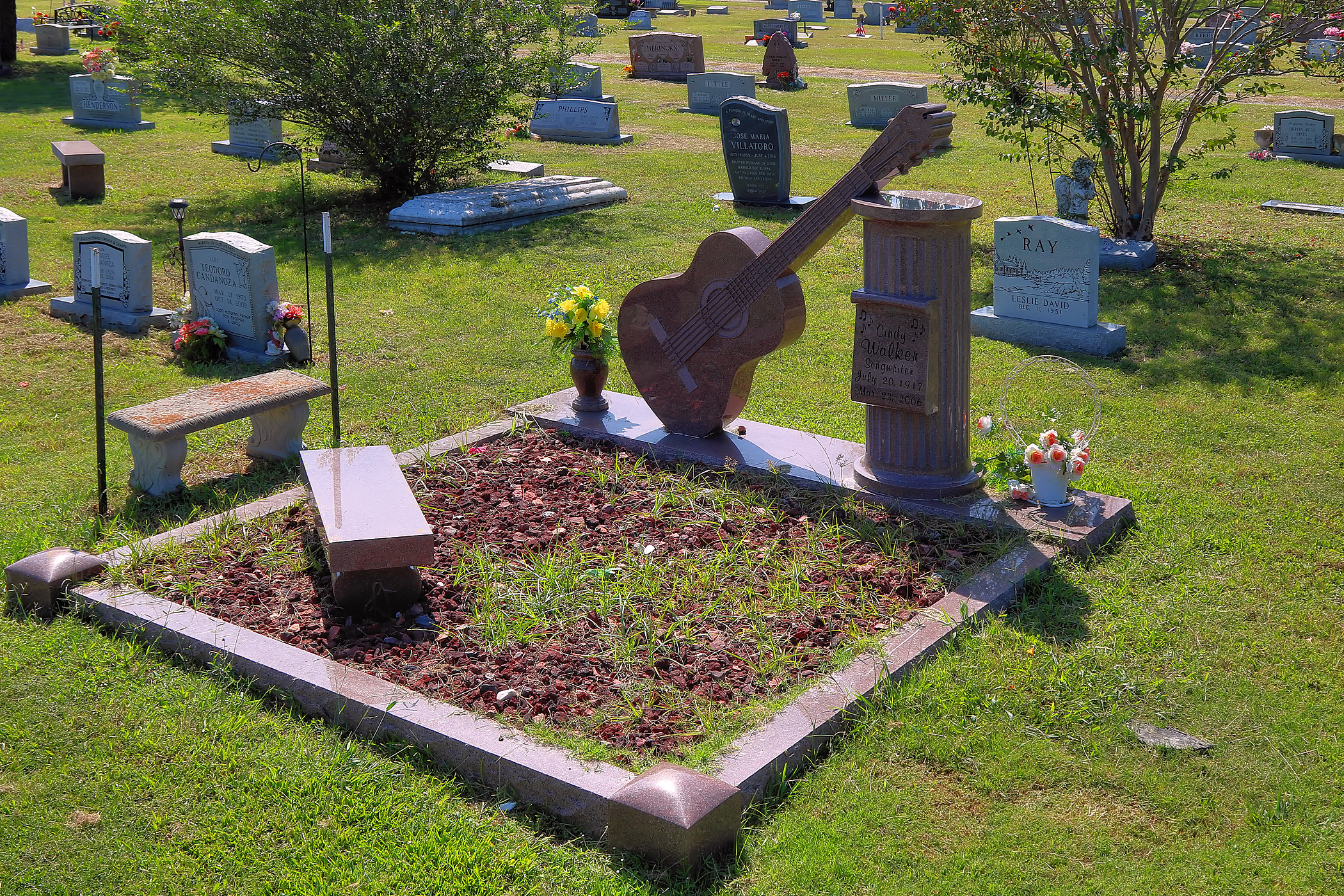
The grave of Cindy Walker in Mexia, Texas.

Walker appreciated the accolades her songs received, and enjoyed her time with performers, fellow songwriters, and music industry leaders, but otherwise strove to protect her privacy. She never publicly discussed her brief marriage in the late 1930s and famously never revealed her age. After her 13-year residency in Hollywood, Walker returned to Texas in 1953, living in Mexia in a modest, three-bedroom house with her widowed mother, Oree. The house is currently owned by the nonprofit Cindy Walker Foundation, which seeks to preserve it.

Walker customarily rose at dawn each day to write songs, the words and music often coming to her simultaneously. She typed her lyrics on her hand-painted pink-trimmed manual typewriter, and presented her finished songs to her mother, singing them while strumming her guitar. Oree could play Cindy' songs on piano after a couple listens, and she accompanied Cindy on home-recorded demos. Each year, Walker and her mother would operate from an apartment in Nashville for five months or so to market the songs. Oree Walker died in 1991. In a 2004 interview, Walker stated: "I miss Mama every day".

=== Death ===
Walker died near her home, at the Parkview Regional Hospital in Mexia, Texas, on March 23, 2006, at age 88. She died nine days after Willie Nelson's tribute album to her was released. She had been ill for several weeks prior to her death.

== Charting singles ==
Year	Single	Peak positions
Year	Single	US Country
1944	"When My Blue Moon Turns to Gold Again"	5

== See also ==
- Mr. Texas (film 1951)
