= George Beverly Shea =

American singer and hymn composer

- Born: February 1, 1909; Winchester, Ontario, Canada
- Died: April 16, 2013 (aged 104); Asheville, North Carolina, U.S.
- Resting place: Billy Graham Library
- Years active: 1929–2013
- Spouses: Erma L. Scharfe (m. 1934; died 1976) Karlene Aceto (m. 1985–2013)
- Children: 2

George Beverly Shea (February 1, 1909 – April 16, 2013) was a Canadian-born American gospel singer and hymn composer. Shea was often described as "America's beloved gospel singer" and was considered "the first international singing 'star' of the gospel world," as a consequence of his solos at Billy Graham Crusades and his exposure on radio, records and television. Because of the large attendance at Graham's Crusades, it is estimated that Shea sang live before more people than anyone else in history.

== Personal life ==
=== Early life and family ===
George Beverly Shea was born in Winchester, Ontario, Canada, on February 1, 1909, the fourth of eight children of the Rev. Adam Joseph Shea (1872–1946), a Wesleyan Methodist Church—now Wesleyan Church—minister, and his wife, Maude Mary Theodora (Whitney) Shea (1881–1971). His uncle, Isaac Shea (1865–1946) of Winchester had fought in the Second Boer War with the Royal Canadian Dragoons.

=== Religious background ===
The Shea family served at the Wesleyan Methodist church in Winchester, Ontario, Canada; Houghton, New York (1917–1921); the Sunnyside Wesleyan Methodist church in Ottawa, Ontario, Canada, from 1921; at the Willett Memorial Wesleyan Methodist Church at Midler Avenue, Syracuse, New York; and the Jersey City, New Jersey Wesleyan Methodist church during his youth.

Shea himself said that he became a Christian at the age of five or six, but made a rededication to Christ when he was 18, at the Sunnyside Wesleyan Methodist Church in Ottawa:

[T]here were times when I needed to rededicate my life to the Lord Jesus. When I was 18, my dad was pastoring a church in Ottawa, and I was feeling not too spiritual. The church was having a "special effort," as they called it, for a week. I remember that on Friday night Dad came down from the pulpit and tenderly placed his hand on my shoulder. He whispered, "I think tonight might be the night, son, when you come back to the Lord." Whatever Dad did or said, I listened to him and respected him. And, yes, that was the night!

=== Musical background ===
Shea was taught to play the violin by his father, and the piano and organ by his mother. Shea's bass-baritone voice brought early recognition and provided many opportunities for him to sing in his father's church. He began singing at religious meetings in the Ottawa Valley.

=== Education ===
Shea attended Annesley College in Ottawa, before transferring in 1928 to Houghton College (Houghton, New York), where he studied singing with Herman Baker. While studying at Houghton College, Shea sang with the Houghton College Glee Club. Financial difficulties made it necessary for him to terminate his studies in 1929.

=== Life insurance company employment ===
After leaving college, Shea became a clerk in the medical department in the New York City offices of the Mutual of New York life insurance company, where he worked for the next nine years.

=== Marriages and children ===
Shea married his childhood sweetheart, Erma L. Scharfe (1908–1976) on 16 June 1934. Shea and Erma had two children: Ronnie and Elaine.

Shea's children became Christians at an early age. Shea's daughter Elaine became a Christian at the age of 8 during a Billy Graham Crusade at the Cow Palace, San Francisco, California, in 1958. In 1959, Ron responded to an invitation by Billy Graham during one of the Crusade meetings in Sydney, Australia and was counseled by Grady Wilson. Erma Shea died in September 1976, and memorial services were held at Western Springs, Illinois, on 8 September 1976.

On 19 December 1985, Shea married Karlene Aceto (1942–), a 1972 graduate of Montreat College, in Montreat, North Carolina. In a September 2007 interview, Shea recalled how he met and married his second wife, Karlene:

It has been 20 years of bliss. I was a widower for 10 years in a suburb of Chicago and that's a long time. When we were over in Korea in 1984, Billy brought me into his room and said, 'I've been talking to Ruth, my wife, in Montreat this morning on the phone and we think that 10 years is enough,' and so he mentioned Karlene's name. Mr. Graham didn't do the service. We had the pastor of our church here and he put on his nice robe and we were married in Billy's home.

Shea, who became a naturalized American citizen in 1941, and his wife, Karlene, who was 33 years his junior, lived in Montreat, North Carolina, on the same road as Billy Graham's home.

=== Death ===
Shea died on April 16, 2013, at the age of 104 from complications following a stroke. He was buried on the grounds of the Billy Graham Library in Charlotte, North Carolina.

A reed organ owned by Shea now belongs to Art Robinson.

== Ministry ==
=== New York (1929–1939) ===
As a result of the recommendation of American opera baritone John Charles Thomas (born 6 September 1891 – died 13 December 1960), Shea studied singing under Gino Monaco, Thomas's own vocal coach.

While working for Mutual Life in New York City Shea appeared on an amateur hour program hosted by Fred Allen on NBC radio. Despite losing to a yodeler, Shea earned second place, and a spot singing popular music on Allen's program, probably a precursor to Allen's Town Hall Tonight. Although Shea "impressed the critics and scores of fans", he still didn't feel he had discovered a direction for his life.

In 1933, a network radio director heard Shea sing and arranged an audition to sing popular secular songs for Your Hit Parade, a national program with the Lyn Murray Singers broadcast on the NBC network. Shea passed the audition and was offered a job, but reluctantly turned the position down because he didn't feel right about performing secular music.

Shea sang regularly on radio station WHN, and on Erling C. Olsen's Meditations in the Psalms broadcast on radio station WMCA, as well as doing 30-minute programs from 7-7:30 am on WKBO in Jersey City, New Jersey. Shea also appeared on WKBO's "the Old Fashioned Gospel Hour."

Shea sang on the Young Person's Church of the Air radio program, which had been started by Percy Crawford (1902–1960) in Philadelphia in 1931 on Radio station WIP.

Shea began his recording career at the U.S. branch of Decca Records after being signed by A & R representative Jack Kapp, who told Shea: "If you do better than the singer we have in mind, we will give you a contract. If not, you'll have to take the records on yourself. Shea recorded "Jesus Whispers Peace," "Lead Me Gently Home, Father," "I'd Rather Have Jesus," and "God Understands," accompanied by Ruth Crawford (wife of Percy Crawford) on the organ. About 7,000 copies were sold, and they are prized by music lovers today, the majority being Protestant Christians like Shea.

=== Chicago (1939–1952) ===
In 1939, Shea auditioned unsuccessfully for a spot on a CBS radio program that originated in Chicago, Illinois.

WMBI (1939–1944)

Soon after Dr. Will Houghton, president of the Moody Bible Institute (MBI) offered Shea a staff position with "duties that included emceeing, interviewing, news-casting, continuity writing, programming, administration, auditioning, and singing" on radio station WMBI, "the powerhouse of evangelical radio", the first non-commercial Christian radio station in America, which was owned and operated by the Moody Bible Institute originally on its campus in Chicago. Initially Shea sang on Houghton's Let's Go Back to the Bible, from 1939. Later he was also involved in Miracles and Melodies, which started on 67 radio stations across the US in 1940, and was broadcast on 187 different stations in 45 US states, Canada, Latin America and China; and in Hymns From the Chapel each morning at 8:15.

Songs in the Night (1944–1952)

On 2 January 1944, Shea began his ministry as a featured soloist on Billy Graham's Songs in the Night weekly radio program, which was broadcast live on Sunday evenings for 45 minutes from 10:15pm from the basement of the Village (Baptist) Church at 4475 Wolf Road, Western Springs, Illinois, pastored by Graham, and transmitted on radio station WCFL originating from Chicago, Illinois. The popularity of Shea helped make the previously financially struggling program self-sustaining within weeks. The Drummonds indicate that Shea "skyrocketed the broadcast into a great success," so that soon Songs in the Night was broadcast twice on Sundays.

After eight years Shea turned over his duties on this program to Glenn Jorian so that he could devote his energies full-time to the Billy Graham Evangelistic Association (BGEA).

Club Time (1944–1952)

In June 1944, Shea resigned from WMBI to sing gospel on a 15-minute weekday radio program, Club Time, the second oldest hymn program on commercial radio. Club Time, initially broadcast on Radio station WCFL, was sponsored by Herbert J. Taylor (18 April 1893 – 1 May 1978), a Christian businessman who headed Club Aluminum of Chicago. According to Cusic:

Shea's job was to host the program and sing several songs, including the favorite hymn of various famous people. It was on "Club Time" that Beverly Shea became George Beverly Shea at the insistence of the advertising agency; it seems they felt most listeners were confused by a man named "Beverly."

Club Time was broadcast nationally from September 1945 for the next seven years over the ABC Radio and Armed Forces Networks and many independent stations. This show brought Shea national recognition, and by 1951 Shea was the most prominent male soloist in gospel music.

Singspiration (1947)

By the summer of 1947, Shea was signed to the Singspiration Sacred Recordings label, which had been founded by Dr. Alfred B. Smith (8 November 1916 – 9 August 2001) in 1941, where he sang on a number of 78 rpm albums, including Bass Baritone (Singspiration "Treasure Chest Series" LP S-100) and Lead Me Gently Home, Father (Singspiration LP 156).

=== Evangelistic meetings (1942–1947) ===
Summer of 1942

In the summer of 1942, Shea took a leave of absence from WMBI to join Word Of Life (WOL) evangelist Jack Wyrtzen for evangelistic crusades in the New York area. He spent this summer traveling throughout New Jersey, New York, and Connecticut, singing at youth rallies while also singing on WHN on Sunday mornings.

Youth for Christ (1942)

When Shea returned to Chicago in September 1942, he talked with Torrey Johnson about conducting youth meetings in that area and soon "Chicagoland Youth For Christ" was held in Orchestra Hall on Michigan Avenue, Chicago, with Shea singing and Billy Graham speaking. From this initial concert, Johnson founded Youth for Christ (YFC). Shea sang in YFC rallies across the U.S. and Canada.

=== Billy Graham Evangelistic Association (1947 to 2013) ===
According to Don Cusic, "Shea and Billy Graham are the prime examples of an evangelical Christianity with mainstream appeal after World War II. Previously the evangelicals and fundamentalists were on the fringes of American religion; Shea and Graham put it in the mainstream." According to David Poling, "central to Billy's successful ministry are the years of loyal service of people like George Beverly Shea, the first staff member to be hired by Graham back in the Chicago radio days." Shea had been involved as a soloist with Billy Graham and his ministry since 1947.

Shea first met Billy Graham in 1940 while Graham was pastor of the Village Church in Western Springs, Illinois. In a September 2007 interview Shea recalled how he first met Billy Graham:

One morning, there was a rap on my office door. I looked out and there was a tall young man with blond hair and we shook hands. He was 21 and I was 31. It was Billy Graham and he had traveled in from Wheaton College on a train just to say 'hello.' He said he listened to my morning hymn show called 'Hymns From The Chapel.' That's how we first got acquainted. I came into this work with Mr. Graham in 1947 after we had exchanged letters and talked on the phone. He said he wanted me to be his gospel singer. I thanked him but told him the only gospel singers I've ever heard about would sing a verse or two and stop and talk a while. 'Would I have to do that?' I asked him. He chuckled and said, 'I hope not.' With that, I said, 'Well, I'd like to come with you.' That was in November of 1947 and I've been with him ever since.

In 1948, Shea, along with Graham, Barrows and Grady Wilson, formulated a set of ethical guidelines, later designated The Modesto Manifesto, that became the cornerstone of the BGEA. Shea, along with Graham, Barrows, Grady Wilson and George Wilson, is one of the five directors of the BGEA.

==== Billy Graham Crusades ====
Shea sang at the unofficial launching of Graham's crusades in the old Armory in Charlotte, North Carolina, in November 1947. His first song was "I Will Sing the Wondrous Story." In the early days of his association with Graham, Shea earned a wage for each meeting.

Since the beginning of Graham's crusade ministry Shea and Cliff Barrows have been the nucleus of the crusade musical team. Barrows is choir director, platform emcee and radio-television program director. They were joined in 1950 by pianist Tedd Smith, and through the years organists Don Hustad and John Innes have provided additional accompaniment.

As the musical mainstay in Graham's crusades, Shea is often called "America's beloved Gospel singer." In each crusade Shea "brings a quiet solo immediately preceding ... Graham's message. His solo serves as a transition from the song service into the message." Collins indicates: "Shea's solos set the tone for the preacher's messages. With his full, rich baritone Shea not only charmed audiences, he also touched them with the message of each song he chose." Graham said that Shea always prepared his crowds by singing before the message, and he felt the song was more powerful than the sermon. According to Billy Graham in a 2002 interview in The Ottawa Citizen,

I've been listening to Bev Shea sing for more than 50 years, and I would still rather hear him sing than anyone else I know.

Shea himself indicated the importance of his solo: "Billy looks forward to the solo before the message as a time for people to quiet down and for him to gather strength."

Shea also made a valuable contribution to the increased effectiveness of Graham's crusades. According to R. Alan Streett:

For a number of years the entire congregation sang the invitational hymn, until Bev Shea suggested that the choir alone handle the assignment. Shea remembered how he, as an eighteen-year-old lad, was convicted by the Spirit as a choir sang "Just As I Am." He felt the effects of a soft choir number could be used by God to touch people's hearts.

One day Shea suggested to Graham:

Have you ever thought of saying, "As the choir sings, you come"? With just the choir singing there might be more contemplation upon the Holy Spirit's call. Soon after that, for the first time in his growing ministry, he began to say at the close of every service, "As the choir sings, you come!"

Hour of Decision (1950)

The Hour of Decision radio program was produced in the recording studio of Arthur "Guitar Boogie" Smith in Charlotte, North Carolina. On 5 December 1950 the Hour of Decision radio broadcasts began in Atlanta, Georgia, on 150 radio stations. By its fifth week Hour of Decision had the largest audience of any religious radio program in history. By 1952 Shea sang regularly on this program.

Because of Shea's weekly singing on the Hour of Decision radio broadcast since 1950 and his numerous personal appearances, his voice is recognized now in Africa, Asia, Australia, Europe, South America, and throughout North America.

=== Recording career (1951 to 2013) ===
Shea has recorded approximately 500 vocal solos on more than seventy albums (including nine compact discs) of religious music on both the RCA Victor and Word Records labels. Shea has recorded songs with orchestral accompaniment, as arranged and conducted by musical directors, such as Hugo Winterhalter, Ralph Carmichael, Bill Walker, Nathan Scott, Norman Leyden, Jimmy Owens, Kurt Kaiser, Danny Davis, Charles Grean, and Radio City Music Hall organist, Ray Bohr. His albums have been produced by RCA Victor's Steve Sholes, Brad McCuen, Darol Rice, Cliff Barrows, Don Hustad, Bill Fasig, and John Innes. His rich Canadian baritone voice can also be heard on Ricky Skaggs album Mosaic.

==== RCA Victor and Word ====
In 1951, Shea was signed to RCA Victor Records by Sam Wallace and Elmer Eades, after being "discovered" by Paul Barkmeyer. His first album for RCA Victor, released on 10-inch and 12-inch long-playing records and on 45 RPM records, was entitled Inspirational Songs, produced by Stephen H. Sholes (12 February 1911 – 22 April 1968) and backed by Hugo Winterhalter and his Orchestra. During Shea's first four years with RCA Victor, his records did not recover the cost of recording and pressing, but by the end of the 1950s, he enjoyed major success. After a 24-year association with the label, he left it in favor of Word Records in 1975.

==== Notable songs ====
Shea is best known for his rendition of "How Great Thou Art," the English translation by Rev. Stuart K. Hine of the Swedish song "O Store Gud," written in 1886 by Rev. Carl Boberg (1859–1940). Arguably Shea's most popular hymn is "The Wonder of It All," the title of which was also used by the University of North Carolina Center for Public Television for their 1998 production of his life story.

=== Composing ===
- "I'd Rather Have Jesus" (1932)

In 1932, Shea composed the tune to "I'd Rather Have Jesus," the words of which were written by Rhea F. Miller (1894–1966), the wife of Dr. Howard Miller, later a general superintendent of the Church of the Nazarene. When RCA Victor signed Shea to a recording contract, "the song that the company chose to initially spotlight their new singer was "I'd Rather Have Jesus."

- "The Wonder of It All" (1955)

Shea also wrote both the lyrics and music for "The Wonder of It All," which was copyrighted originally by Chancel Music in 1956.

=== Writing ===
Shea authored a number of books including an autobiography, Then Sings My Soul (1968); Songs That Lift the Heart (1972); How Sweet the Sound (2004); and Stories Behind 50 Southern Gospel Favorites, Vol. 2 (2005).

=== Television appearances ===
- Hour of Decision (1951–1954): Billy Graham's television program that was broadcast for three years from 1951 in primetime on Sunday evenings on the ABC television network
- Madison Garden Crusade (Summer 1957): sang "How Great Thou Art" in the ABC live telecasts each Saturday evening for Billy Graham's Crusade in Madison Square Garden, in New York City in the summer of 1957; the telecasts attracted an average audience of over 6.4 million viewers
- The Wonder of It All (1998): a television program on his life story produced by North Carolina Public Television
- North Carolina Now (2009): North Carolina Public Television's news program's Mitchell Lewis interviewed Shea; a four-part interview

=== Films ===
- Oiltown, U.S.A. (1953): Shea's first theatrical film, produced by the BGEA's World Wide Pictures
- The Mighty Fortress (1955): a newsreel film of the Billy Graham's 1954 Crusade for Europe, that was produced and directed by Paul Short, in which Shea performed "Amazing Grace"
- Pilgrim's Progress (1977): Ken Anderson's film, in which Shea was the narrator, and Oscar-nominated actor Liam Neeson made his film debut
- Then Sings My Soul (1984): a film musical/documentary produced by World Wide Pictures
- The New Orleans Story (2008): appeared in this documentary on the effects of Hurricane Katrina; written and directed by Stephen Rue

== Awards and honors ==
During his career, Shea was nominated for ten Grammy Awards, winning on March 15, 1966, the 1965 Best Gospel or Other Religious Recording (Musical) for his album "Southland Favorites" (RCA LSP-3440) recorded with the Anita Kerr Quartet.

In 1978, he was inducted into the Gospel Music Hall of Fame by the Gospel Music Association and for his lifelong contribution to gospel music. On 18 February 1982 Shea was awarded the Gold Angel Award for Country Music award by Religion in Media in Hollywood, California.

The Christian Holiness Association (now Christian Holiness Partnership) presented Shea its Christian Service Award in 1993. In 1996 the association of National Religious Broadcasters voted Shea into its "Religious Broadcasting Hall of Fame."

On September 11, 1999, Shea received the Integrity Award from Marketplace Ministries in Dallas, Texas. Shea also received a Lifetime Achievement Award from the Gospel Music Association Canada (GMA Canada) in 2004. He was presented the Edwin P. Hubble Medal of Initiative, the highest honor of the city of Marshfield, Missouri, in 2007 by friend Reverend Nicholas W. Inman. Shea sang at the dedication of the Billy Graham Library the following day.

On February 12, 2011, Shea received the 2010 Lifetime Achievement Grammy Award alongside Julie Andrews, Roy Haynes, the Juilliard String Quartet, the Kingston Trio, Dolly Parton and the Ramones at a ceremony held at the Wilshire Ebell Theater in Los Angeles, California.

=== Honorary degrees ===
In 1956, Shea received an honorary doctorate, the Doctor of Fine Arts, from his alma mater, Houghton College. In 1972, Shea received another honorary doctorate, the Doctor of Sacred Music (D Sacred MUS), from Trinity College (now Trinity International University) of Deerfield, Illinois.

== Biographical book ==
Shea is the subject of an authorized biography, George Beverly Shea: Tell Me the Story by Paul Davis, published on April 15, 2009.

== References in popular culture ==
Shea and "How Great Thou Art" are mentioned in Patricia Cornwell's 1998 best-selling novel Hornet's Nest. There is an allusion to Shea in Brad Whittington's coming of age novel Living with Fred. Shea is mentioned in the Christian novel The Peacemakers, the final volume in Jack Cavanaugh's "American Family Portrait" series.

== See also ==
- Los Angeles Crusade (1949)
