= Redd Harper =

American singer-songwriter

Redd Harper (September 29, 1903, in Nocona, Texas, United States – February 16, 1992, in Los Angeles, California, USA), also known as Mr. Texas, was an American composer, author, singer, actor, and evangelist.

== Early life ==
Although he was born in Texas he was raised primarily in Oklahoma where he enjoyed his childhood due to the freedom and beauty that came with the landscape of the area. Growing up, he had many influences, both religious and musical, that would shape his future career. He grew up with two devoutly Christian friends who, over time, were partly the cause of him accepting that faith. He was a natural guitar player and had an interest in traditional Western Country music but also newer genres such as Western Jazz, leading him to learn to play the trumpet as well. In his teens he discontinued his work as a cattle-hand and rancher to pursue journalism. He enrolled in the University of Oklahoma and, upon graduation, began work as a newspaper reporter. However he always had aspirations of becoming a country musician.

== Musical career ==
He was a part of a concert band that became more and more successful until they were invited to join an Oklahoma City radio station in 1924. From there, his career took off and his music was in greater demand. In 1931 he joined a larger radio station in Des Moines, found more success, and then decided to head to Hollywood, California. However, he arrived at the end of the Western Jazz era and the beginning of the Great Depression, thus finding it hard to find work and was not as successful as he had been. He struggled to find work in the city. When World War II started, he joined the Coast Guard for three years.

After the war he found success again in Hollywood as he began working with other big-name artists of the time from both radio and movies. During this time he also found success in the movie industry and starred in several films, including The Strawberry Roan.

In 1950, he attended a Hollywood Christian Group meeting and was fully converted then. Christianity became the predominant influence in his life and his songs after reflect this change. He began combining his musical talents with his new passion for evangelist work. Around this time he released a long playing record of Christian-themed songs on Singtime Records called "Mr. Texas Sings."

== Missionary work and later life ==
Some time after his conversion, he went on missionary expedition to the South Pacific, New Zealand, Australia, The Philippines, Hong Kong, Japan, Europe, and Africa. The rest of his life was spent doing evangelist work. He died in 1992 in the same residence he and his wife Laura had resided in.

== See also ==
- Mr. Texas
