= Cliff Barrows =

American Christian music director (1923–2016)

- Born: Clifford Burton Barrows; April 6, 1923; Ceres, California, U.S.
- Died: November 15, 2016 (aged 93); Charlotte, North Carolina, U.S.
- Occupations: Music director, gospel music artist, evangelist,
- Years active: 1944-2016
- Spouse(s): Wilma Newell (1945-1994, her death); Ann Prince (1995-2016, his death)
- Children: 5
- Awards: Gospel Music Hall Of Fame inductee, 1988; Religious Broadcasting Hall of Fame inductee, 1996

Clifford Burton Barrows (April 6, 1923 – November 15, 2016) was a longtime music and program director for the Billy Graham Evangelistic Association. He had been a part of the Graham organization since 1949. Barrows was best known as the host of Graham's weekly Hour of Decision radio program, and the song leader and choir director for the crusade meetings.

== Life ==
Cliff Barrows was born on April 6, 1923, in Ceres, California, the son of Harriet M. and Charles Tilson Barrows.

Barrows graduated from Bob Jones University in 1944 with a B.A. in Sacred Music. He was ordained as a Baptist minister in 1944, and served as an assistant pastor at Temple Baptist Church in St. Paul, Minnesota, through 1945.

In 1945, Barrows married Billie Newell. It was on their honeymoon in western North Carolina they first met a young evangelist named Billy Graham. Barrows joined Graham at a rally in Asheville, North Carolina, that year, and remained with Graham thereafter..

He appeared in the 1970 film His Land with British pop singer Cliff Richard. The film reviews Biblical events as both Cliffs took a pilgrimage to Israel. It was produced by Graham's production company, World Wide Pictures.

In 1988, Barrows was inducted into the Gospel Music Hall of Fame in Nashville, Tennessee, by the Gospel Music Association. In 1996, he was also inducted into the Religious Broadcasting Hall of Fame by the National Religious Broadcasters. Barrows' longtime colleague, the late Canadian-born singer George Beverly Shea, is also a member of both halls of fame.

Barrows died at Carolinas Medical Center – Pineville, in Charlotte, North Carolina, on November 15, 2016, at the age of 93.

== Personal life ==
Barrows and his first wife Wilma Newell (1925–1994) had five children; Bonnie (born 1948), Robert (1950), Betty Ruth (1953), Clifford ("Bud") (1955), and William Burton (1962).

In 1995, Barrows married Ann Prince and resided in Marvin, North Carolina.

== See also ==
- Hour of Decision
- Mr. Texas (film 1951)
- Los Angeles Crusade (1949)
