= Los Angeles Crusade (1949) =

Evangelical campaign by Bill Graham

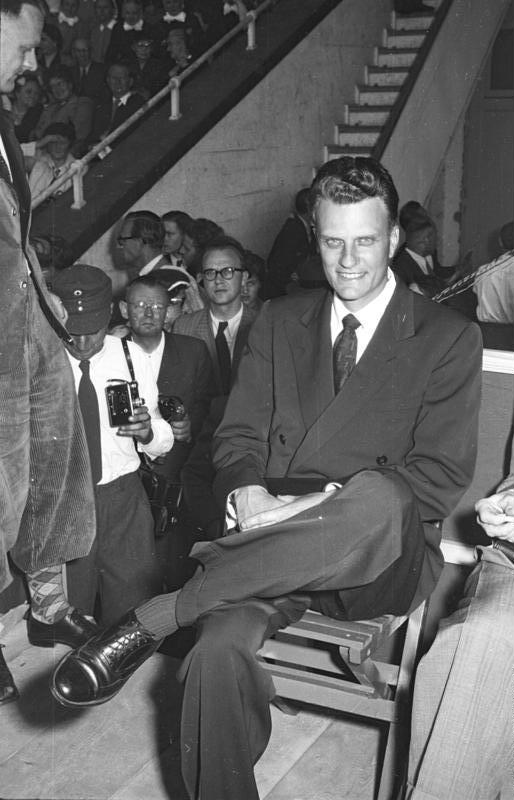
Billy Graham in 1954

The Los Angeles Crusade of 1949 was the first great evangelistic campaign of Billy Graham. It was organized by the Christian group Christ for Greater Los Angeles. The campaign was scheduled for three weeks, but it was extended to eight weeks. During the campaign Graham spoke to 350,000 people, by the end, 3,000 of them decided to convert to Christianity. It was subsequently described as the greatest revival since the time of Billy Sunday. After this crusade Graham became a national figure in the United States.

== Preparation ==
The Christ for Greater Los Angeles' committee scheduled a series of revival meetings in Los Angeles in 1949. The committee had decided to invite Billy Graham as the preacher. The crusade started on September 25, 1949. It was scheduled for three weeks between September 25 and October 17.

It was organized with prayer support provided by more than a thousand prayer groups that had been formed in and around Los Angeles. These groups regularly prayed for the crusade's success.

== Crusade ==
A circus tent that held 6,000 people was erected in a parking lot at the southeast corner of Washington Boulevard and Hill Street, which had once been the site of the Washington Park baseball park. The tent was enlarged to 9,000 and was still too small. The last meeting took place at 20 November. Graham preached: "I don't believe that any man can solve his problems of life without Jesus Christ" "All across Europe, people know that time is running out," (...) "Now that Russia has the atomic bomb, the world is in an armament race driving us to destruction."

The interest of local and national newspapers was piqued when Stuart Hamblen announced on-air that he had been converted. His conversion was followed by that of former Olympian and prisoner of war Louis Zamperini and Jim Vaus, a friend of mobster Mickey Cohen. Harvey Fritz, an actor, was another celebrity conversion.

== Result ==
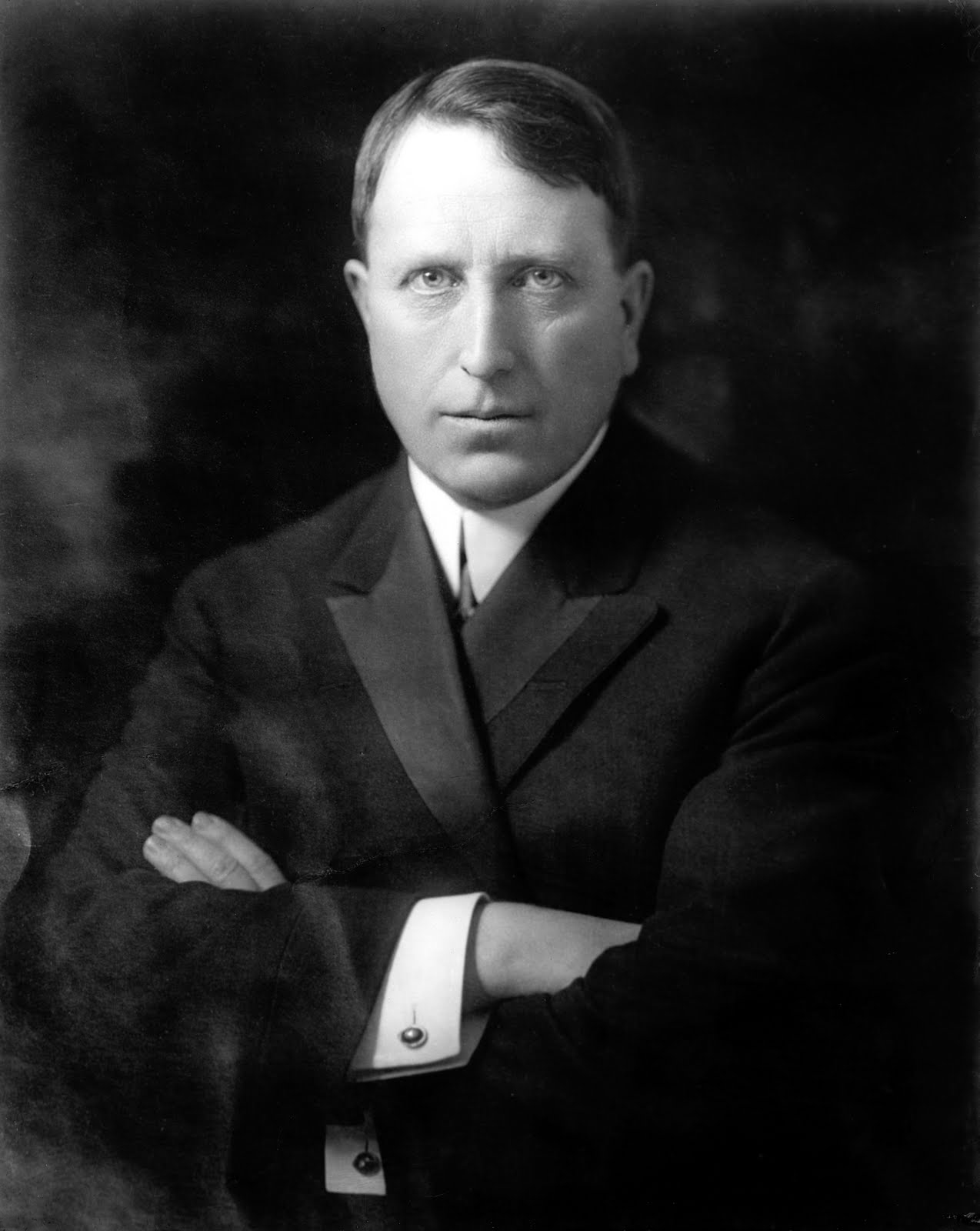
William Hearst

After Hamblen's conversion, William Randolph Hearst sent a telegram to all his newspaper editors: "Puff Graham." As a result, within five days Graham gained national coverage. With such media attention, the crusade event ran for eight weeks—five weeks longer than planned. Graham became a national figure. Henry Luce also promoted Graham with coverage at this time, and by 1954 featured him on the cover of his magazine TIME. According to Bothwell, Hearst and Luce supported Graham because of his anticommunist message.

Due to the Los Angeles crusade Evangelicalism was introduced as an influential force in American culture.

According to some scholars such as Ben Bagdikian, Hearst liked Graham's patriotism and appeals to youth; he thought the evangelist would help promote Hearst's conservative anti-communist views. The scholar Randall E. King notes that Hearst and Graham never met.

== See also ==
- List of Billy Graham's crusades
- London Crusade (1954)
- New York Crusade (1957)
- Wiretapper
