= Paul Mickelson =

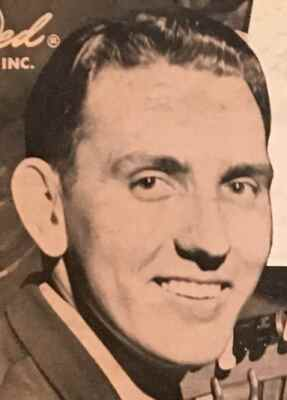
- Paul Mickelson, early 1950s

Background information
- Born: December 30, 1927; Burbank, California
- Died: October 21, 2001 (aged 73); Sacramento, California
- Genres: Christian sacred
- Occupation(s): organist, arranger, conductor, record company executive
- Years active: 1950s – 1980s
- Labels: International; Sacred; RCA Victor; His Master's Voice; Word; Supreme/Console; Pye; Singcord/New Dawn/Zondervan

Paul Mickelson (December 30, 1927 – October 21, 2001) was an American organist, arranger, and record label executive who specialized in Christian music. First performing for mass media at the age of 16, he gained national recognition as organist for the Billy Graham crusade from 1950 to 1958. He left Graham to concentrate on recordings, becoming an executive at Word Records before founding Supreme Records and its subsidiaries. He recorded and released numerous albums of religious music as an organist and orchestral arranger/conductor.

== Biography ==
Mickelson was born and grew up in Burbank, California. He began music lessons at the age of nine. His broadcast career commenced at the age of 16, when as a member of the Burbank Foursquare Church he was the organist for the church's weekly program Challenge to Youth on KMPC. Mickelson began recording at the age of eighteen; his first session took place with the NBC pipe organ in Hollywood. At the time of his first recording session he was appearing on 20 local radio shows each week as an organist.

Mickelson joined the Billy Graham crusade as organist in 1950 and stayed until September 1957, leaving Graham in order to concentrate on recording activities on a full-time basis. He signed as a recording artist to RCA Victor Records in 1953, and also became A&R director for religious music. He was with RCA until 1958, when he joined Word Records as an artist and vice president responsible for A&R. Mickelson founded Supreme Records in 1961, which—including subsidiaries Console Records and Cornerstone Records—became one of the largest American labels devoted to sacred music until it was absorbed by Zondervan Publishing.

Later in life he was a concertizing representative for Church Organ Systems. He had joined the Seventh-Day Adventist church by 1997, and was organist for the denomination's 2000 General Conference Session.

Mickelson died on October 21, 2001, of a myocardial infarction while visiting Sacramento, California. At the time of his death he was a member of the United Community Church in Glendale, California.

== Musical output ==
A church publication opined that a Mickelson recording was "unusual" in that it was "spirited but not swingy; reverent, but not pious". Billboard stated that Mickelson's initial Supreme Strings album was a surprise in the religious field, as the beauty of the arrangement and performance was unsurpassed in the popular field. Most Supreme Records albums contain artistic participation by Mickelson, either as pianist or organist accompianment, or as arranger and conductor. The majority of his organ output uses full theater organ registrations. Although his recorded output is strictly religious in nature, he was known to play a few popular tunes at pipe organ "jam sessions" held in Los Angeles.

He provided arrangements for Pat Boone, Tony Fontane, Jerome Hines and Ethel Waters. In all, more than 700 of his arrangements were recorded.

Mickelson was able to purchase multiple organs of note, including the organ from NBC's Hollywood Studios (the organ he first used to record as a solo artist) and the Robert-Morton unit from MCA's Whitney recording studios.

== Personal life ==
In addition to his music career, Mickelson was an ordained minister. Mickelson was married to Barbara Mickelson at the time of his death.

== Representative discography ==
=== As organist/pianist ===
- 1950s - Paul Mickelson Plays the Mighty Radio City Pipe Organ - International LP 5031 (10")
- 1950s - The Billy Graham Team (with Tedd Smith) - International LP 5033
- 1950s - Paul Mickelson Organ Selections - Sacred LP 7020 (10")
- 1950s - Gospel Songs And Hymns As You Like To Hear Them Sacred LP9015
- 1950s - When They Ring The Golden Bells - RCA Victor LPM-1059
- 1954 - Modern Sacred Music - RCA Victor LPM 3210
- 1955 - Christmas Bells - RCA LPM-1115
- 1956 - Best Loved Hymns - RCA Victor LPM-1352
- 1950s - The Music of Paul Mickelson - RCA Victor LPM-1405
- 1950s - Paul Mickelson Plays the Conn Classic Organ - Word WST-8003
- 1960s - Paul Mickelson Plays for Youth - Word WST 8018
- 1960s - Day Is Dying In the West - Console CS 6001
- 1960s - Eventide - Console CS 6003
- 1960s - Christmas Concert at the Console - Console CS 6005
- 1960s - Paul Mickelson's Organ Music - Console CS 6006
- 1960s - Paul Mickelson in Concert - Console CS 6007
- 1970s - Love Songs - Singcord ZLP 974S
- 1976 - Paul Mickelson Plays The Music Of John W. Peterson On The Robert Morton Pipe Organ - Singcord ZLP 975S
- 1977 - Because He Lives - Singcord ZLP-3020S

=== As conductor/arranger ===
- 1955 - Singing Strings: The Music of Paul Mickelson - RCA Victor LPM 1138
- 1958 - Paul Mickelson Orchestra: Great Moments in Religious Music - RCA Victor LPM 1754
- 1959 - Resplendent Themes - Word W7002
- 1959 - Cathedral Symphony of London: Glory! Glory! Hallelujah!! - Word W-7004
- 1960 - The Mickelson Touch - Word W-3113
- 1960s - Paul Mickelson Choir: Choirsing - Supreme SS-2018
- 1960s - Paul Mickelson Conducts a Symphony of Strings - Supreme SS-2022
- 1960s - Paul Mickelson Choir: Choirsing Volume 2 - Supreme SS-2023
- 1968 - The Supreme Strings - Supreme SS 2050
- 1970s - The Four Sides of Paul Mickelson - Supreme SS 2071, Pye CSCL 40006
- 1970s - The Supreme Strings Volume 2 - Supreme SLP 384
- - Paul Mickelson Singers: He's the One - Supreme SLP-496
- - Paul Mickelson Singers: Beautiful Sunshine - Supreme SLP-502
- 1976 - The Gift: A Christmas Cantata - Singcord ZLP 989S
- 1979 - The Dawn Of Life: A Musical On The Life Of Christ - Singspiration ZLP 3098
- 1970s - The Supreme Strings: I Am Loved - New Dawn ZLP 3106S

== See also ==
- Rudy Atwood
