= List of Victoria first-class cricketers =

List of cricketers

This is a list of Victoria first-class cricketers. The Victoria cricket team have played first-class cricket since 1851, when they played the Tasmania cricket team at Launceston.

Below is a chronological list of cricketers to have represented Victoria at first-class level. Many of the cricketers played first-class cricket for other teams but the information included under 'Debut', 'Career' and 'Matches' are for their career with the Victoria cricket team. The first day of each match is the date given as their debut. When a number sign # is shown next to a cricketer's debut date it indicates that it was the second of two matches to be played on the same day. When an asterisk * appears next to their match tally then it indicates that they are still a member of the Victorian squad and the number of matches may increase.

== 19th century ==
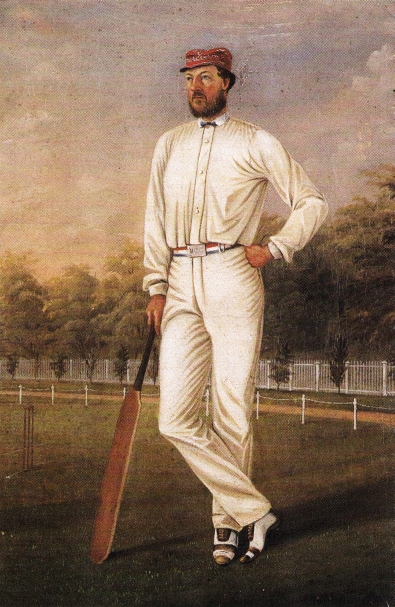
Tom Wills regularly captained Victoria from 1858 to 1876.

Victoria first-class cricketers
Number	Name	Debut	Career	Matches
1	Thomas Antill	11 February 1851	1850/51	1
2	James Brodie	11 February 1851	1850/51–1860/61	3
3	Duncan Cooper	11 February 1851	1850/51	1
4	Melmoth Hall	11 February 1851	1850/51–1853/54	2
5	Thomas Hamilton	11 February 1851	1850/51–1857/58	3
6	Matthew Hervey	11 February 1851	1850/51–1851/52	2
7	Charles Lister	11 February 1851	1850/51–1851/52	2
8	Frederick Marsden	11 February 1851	1850/51–1851/52	2
9	Richard Philpott	11 February 1851	1850/51	1
10	William Philpott	11 February 1851	1850/51–1855/56	2
11	Alfred Thomson	11 February 1851	1850/51–1853/54	2
12	Edward a'Beckett	29 March 1852	1851/52–1856/57	2
13	Malwyn a'Beckett	29 March 1852	1851/52	1
14	Henry Foot	29 March 1852	1851/52	1
15	Frederick Powlett	29 March 1852	1851/52–1853/54	2
16	Charles Sladen	29 March 1852	1851/52	1
17	John Stevens	29 March 1852	1851/52	1
18	Richard Brodie	3 March 1854	1853/54	1
19	George Cavenagh	3 March 1854	1853/54	1
20	John Cox	3 March 1854	1853/54	1
21	Andrew Dick	3 March 1854	1853/54	1
22	Gervase Du Croz	3 March 1854	1853/54	1
23	Edward Rowlands	3 March 1854	1853/54	1
24	H. E. Stratford	3 March 1854	1853/54	1
25	Robert Wilkinson	3 March 1854	1853/54	1
26	Richard Coulstock	26 March 1856	1855/56–1856/57	2
27	Charles Cumberland	26 March 1856	1855/56–1856/57	2
28	Gideon Elliott	26 March 1856	1855/56–1860/61	9
29	Augustus Hotham	26 March 1856	1855/56	1
30	Philip Kington	26 March 1856	1855/56	1
31	Arthur Lewis	26 March 1856	1855/56	1
32	Frederick Lowe	26 March 1856	1855/56	1
33	John Mather	26 March 1856	1855/56	1
34	Thomas Morres	26 March 1856	1855/56–1859/60	6
35	David Serjeant	26 March 1856	1855/56–1856/57	2
36	James Bryant	14 January 1857	1856/57–1861/62	8
37	Benjamin Butterworth	14 January 1857	1856/57–1861/62	3
38	William Hammersley	14 January 1857	1856/57–1860/61	5
39	George Marshall	14 January 1857	1856/57–1863/64	11
40	William Rees	14 January 1857	1856/57–1865/66	3
41	Tom Wills	14 January 1857	1856/57–1875/76	16
42	George Pickering	11 January 1858	1857/58	1
43	Thomas Wray	11 January 1858	1857/58–1859/60	3
44	Alfred Black	25 February 1858	1857/58	2
45	Henry Box	25 February 1858	1857/58	2
46	Frederick Burchett	25 February 1858	1857/58	2
47	Thomas Butterworth	25 February 1858	1857/58	2
48	Henry Creswick	25 February 1858	1857/58	2
49	Robert Power	25 February 1858	1857/58	2
50	Alfred Burchett	20 January 1859	1858/59–1859/60	2
51	Barton Grindrod	20 January 1859	1858/59–1859/60	2
52	John Thornton	20 January 1859	1858/59–1859/60	2
53	Edward Whitlow	20 January 1859	1858/59	1
54	John Huddleston	2 February 1860	1859/60–1862/63	4
55	William Ross	2 February 1860	1859/60	1
56	Sam Cosstick	14 February 1861	1860/61–1875/76	16
57	Samuel Hopkinson	14 February 1861	1860/61–1862/63	2
58	John Jacomb	14 February 1861	1860/61	1
59	John Mace	14 February 1861	1860/61	1
60	Charles Makinson	14 February 1861	1860/61–1861/62	2
61	John Conway	9 January 1862	1860/61–1861/62	8
62	Christopher Mace	9 January 1862	1861/62	1
63	William Stewart	9 January 1862	1861/62	1
64	James Thompson	9 January 1862	1861/62	1
65	Richard Wardill	9 January 1862	1861/62–1872/73	8
66	Verney Cameron	5 February 1863	1862/63	1
67	William Greaves	5 February 1863	1862/63–1867/68	4
68	Adam Hope	5 February 1863	1862/63	1
69	James Redfearn	5 February 1863	1862/63	1
70	Edwin Fowler	26 December 1865	1865/66	1
71	George Gibson	26 December 1865	1865/66–1872/73	9
72	Thomas Kelly	26 December 1865	1865/66–1878/79	13
73	George O'Mullane	26 December 1865	1865/66	1
74	Joseph Phillips	26 December 1865	1865/66–1870/71	6
75	J. B. Turner	26 December 1865	1865/66–1866/67	2
76	Daniel Wilkie	26 December 1865	1866/67–1872/73	3
77	Stoddart Campbell	26 December 1866	1866/67–1875/76	11
78	James McPherson	26 December 1866	1866/67	1
79	George Robertson	26 December 1866	1866/67–1871/72	4
80	Benjamin Wardill	26 December 1866	1866/67	1
81	Frank Allan	26 December 1867	1867/68–1882/83	14
82	Joseph Bennett	26 December 1867	1867/68	1
83	Donald Campbell	12 February 1869	1868/69–1880/81	8
84	John Egglestone	12 February 1869	1868/69	2
85	William Gaggin	12 February 1869	1868/69–1872/73	3
86	Louis Goldsmith	12 February 1869	1868/69–1874/75	7
87	Edmund Carter	4 March 1869	1868/69	1
88	Alfred Noyes	4 March 1869	1868/69	1
89	Charles Gordon	24 February 1870	1869/70	1
90	Curtis Reid	24 February 1870	1869/70–1870/71	3
91	Bransby Cooper	24 February 1871	1870/71–1877/78	11
92	Austin Loughnan	24 February 1871	1870/71–1874/75	5
93	Bryan McGan	24 February 1871	1870/71–1874/75	3
94	Noton Osborne	24 February 1871	1870/71	1
95	William Darke	9 March 1871	1870/71	1
96	Edward Heather	9 March 1871	1870/71	1
97	Robert McFarland	9 March 1871	1870/71	1
98	Owen Williams	9 March 1871	1870/71–1875/76	4
99	Harry Boyle	30 March 1872	1871/72–1887/88	28
100	Thomas Hepburn	26 December 1872	1872/73	2
101	Charles Allee	28 February 1873	1872/73–1877/78	6
102	Charles Carr	28 February 1873	1872/73	1
103	Edward Elliott	28 February 1873	1872/73–1880/81	6
104	Edward Fanning	28 February 1873	1872/73	1
105	Henry Bishop	14 March 1873	1872/73	1
106	Edward Butler	14 March 1873	1872/73	1
107	Henry Jennings	14 March 1873	1872/73	1
108	James Stewart	14 March 1873	1872/73	1
109	Jack Blackham	26 December 1874	1874/75–1894/95	45
110	Tom Horan	26 December 1874	1874/75–1891/92	42
111	Michael Murphy	26 December 1874	1874/75	1
112	Jim Slight	26 December 1874	1874/75–1887/88	14
113	Edward Hastings	5 March 1875	1874/75–1877/78	2
114	Billy Midwinter	5 March 1875	1874/75–1886/87	13
115	George Alexander	27 December 1875	1875/76–1879/80	6
116	John Swift	25 February 1876	1875/76–1884/85	3
117	Frederick Baker	26 December 1877	1877/78–1882/83	8
118	John Hodges	26 December 1877	1877/78	2
119	Frederick McEvoy	26 December 1877	1877/78	1
120	William McEvoy	26 December 1877	1877/78	1
121	William Slight	26 December 1877	1877/78	1
122	George Smith	26 December 1877	1877/78–1884/85	2
123	Ben Terry	26 December 1877	1877/78–1880/81	3
124	Percy McDonnell	22 February 1878	1877/78–1884/85	14
125	Tup Scott	22 February 1878	1877/78–1885/86	12
126	John Tennent	22 February 1878	1877/78–1879/80	2
127	Louis Woolf	22 February 1878	1877/78	1
128	William Cooper	21 February 1879	1878/79–1882/83	15
129	Tom Groube	21 February 1879	1878/79–1881/82	2
130	George Major	21 February 1879	1878/79	1
131	William Moule	21 February 1879	1878/79–1885/86	4
132	Johnny Mullagh	7 March 1879	1878/79	1
133	Eugene Palmer	7 March 1879	1878/79–1894/95	19
134	Tom Kendall	26 December 1879	1879/80	1
135	George Coulthard	12 November 1880	1880/81–1881/82	5
136	George Mackay	12 November 1880	1880/81- 1883/84	5
137	Patrick McShane	12 November 1880	1880/81–1892/93	30
138	Robert Pateman	12 November 1880	1880/81–1881/82	2
139	William Tobin	12 November 1880	1880/81–1884/85	3
140	James Trinnick	12 November 1880	1880/81–1886/87	6
141	Jack Edwards	27 December 1880	1880/81–1889/90	9
142	John Healy	18 February 1881	1880/81	1
143	Edward Turner	18 February 1881	1880/81–1883/84	8
144	George Gordon	1 April 1881	1880/81–1888/89	4
145	Wilfred Rickman	1 April 1881	1880/81	1
146	Vincent Trapp	1 April 1881	1880/81–1883/84	3
147	Francis Walters	1 April 1881	1880/81–1893/94	22
148	George Bonnor	16 December 1881	1881/82–1884/85	10
149	James Minchin	24 February 1882	1881/82	1
150	Charles Foot	10 March 1882	1881/82	1
151	John Lawlor	10 March 1882	1881/82–1884/85	3
152	Samuel Morris	10 March 1882	1881/82–1892/93	19
153	Henry Musgrove	10 March 1882	1881/82–1887/88	3
154	William Stokes	10 March 1882	1881/82	1
155	William Bruce	17 November 1882	1882/83–1903/04	61
156	William Logan	17 November 1882	1882/83–1887/88	2
157	John Rosser	17 November 1882	1882/83	4
158	Percy Lewis	26 December 1883	1883/84–1895/96	29
159	Billy Trumble	8 February 1884	1883/84–1889/90	18
160	George Browning	22 February 1884	1883/84–1884/85	2
161	Patrick Deely	22 February 1884	1883/84	1
162	John Harry	22 February 1884	1883/84–1897/98	28
163	Robert Hosie	22 February 1884	1883/84	1
164	Jack Worrall	22 February 1884	1883/84–1901/02	65
165	John McIlwraith	14 November 1884	1884/85–1889/90	13
166	William Robertson	14 November 1884	1884/85–1887/88	6
167	Jack Barrett	23 January 1885	1884/85–1892/93	15
168	Dick Houston	23 January 1885	1884/85–1897/98	21
169	William Vint	23 January 1885	1884/85	1
170	Fred Spofforth	26 December 1885	1885/86–1887/88	5
171	Harry Trott	1 January 1886	1885/86–1907/08	59
172	Goulburn Watsford	1 January 1886	1885/86	1
173	Francis Wingrove	1 January 1886	1885/86	1
174	Albert William Allman Barnard	11 March 1886	1885/86	1
175	Jim Phillips	11 March 1886	1885/86–1895/96	17
176	Charles Ross	11 March 1886	1885/86–1900/01	15
177	Reginald Wood	6 November 1886	1886/87	2
178	Willie Over	11 February 1887	1886/87–1889/90	4
179	Denis Cotter	4 March 1887	1886/87–1887/88	2
180	Hugh Trumble	9 November 1887	1887/88–1903/04	47
181	Harry Freeman	16 December 1887	1887/88–1888/89	4
182	Thomas Hastings	16 December 1887	1887/88–1908/09	15
183	Thomas Turner	16 December 1887	1887/88	2
184	Ernest Bean	17 February 1888	1887/88–1905/06	8
185	Joseph Duffy	17 February 1888	1887/88	1
186	Robert Mitchell	17 February 1888	1887/88–1902/03	12
187	Charles Letcher	9 March 1888	1887/88–1893/94	4
188	Frederick Burton	7 December 1888	1888/89	2
189	John Drysdale	7 December 1888	1888/89–1889/90	7
190	Maesmore Morris	7 December 1888	1888/89	4
191	Edgar Barrett	13 December 1889	1889/90–1894/95	5
192	Bob McLeod	13 December 1889	1889/90–1899/1900	26
193	Walter Ingleton	8 January 1890	1889/90–1896/97	5
194	Frank Richards	8 January 1890	1889/90	1
195	Robert Smith	8 January 1890	1889/90	1
196	Ambrose Tarrant	8 January 1890	1889/90–1897/98	9
197	Sydney Donahoo	26 December 1890	1890/91–1895/96	5
198	John Carlton	24 January 1891	1890/91–1896/97	16
199	Hugh McLean	30 March 1891	1890/91–1891/92	2
200	John Rogers	30 March 1891	1890/91–1891/92	2
201	Alcon Bowman	7 November 1891	1891/92	2
202	Frank Laver	7 November 1891	1891/92–1911/12	78
203	John Stuckey	7 November 1891	1891/92–1909/10	52
204	Charles Kemp	27 November 1891	1891/92–1897/98	2
205	Samuel McMichael	26 December 1891	1891/92–1903/04	27
206	Ernest Hutton	23 January 1892	1891/92	1
207	Harry Graham	24 December 1892	1892/93–1902/03	43
208	Alfred Carlton	28 January 1893	1892/93–1900/01	3
209	Alfred Haddrick	28 January 1893	1892/93	2
210	Henry Maplestone	28 January 1893	1892/93–1898/99	4
211	Daniel McLeod	28 January 1893	1892/93–1894/95	2
212	Albert Trott	1 April 1893	1892/93–1895/96	13
213	Charlie McLeod	23 December 1893	1893/94–1904/05	41
214	Isaac Drape	26 January 1894	1893/94	1
215	Thomas Tatchell	26 January 1894	1893/94–1894/95	2
216	Charles Alsop	30 November 1894	1894/95	1
217	Albert Philpott	30 November 1894	1894/95	1
218	Mickey Roche	26 January 1895	1894/95–1897/98	13
219	George Stuckey	26 January 1895	1894/95–1902/03	3
220	George Vautin	26 January 1895	1894/95	1
221	Tom Warne	26 January 1895	1894/95–1911/12	39
222	Charles Wilson	26 January 1895	1894/95–1897/98	3
223	Alfred Johns	21 March 1895	1894/95–1898/99	16
224	Charles Peryman	21 March 1895	1894/95–1895/96	3
225	Arthur Fenton	25 January 1896	1895/96	1
226	John O'Connor	25 January 1896	1895/96–1896/97	2
227	James O'Halloran	1 January 1897	1896/97	3
228	Herbert Fry	20 January 1897	1896/97–1907/08	8
229	James Giller	20 January 1897	1896/97–1904/05	15
230	Richard Kelly	20 January 1897	1896/97	1
231	Edward Rush	20 January 1897	1896/97–1897/98	3
232	David Sutherland	20 January 1897	1896/97–1900/01	6
233	Alfred Murray	27 December 1897	1897/98–1900/01	5
234	George Beacham	22 January 1898	1897/98	1
235	Francis Wright	22 January 1898	1897/98	1
236	Peter McAlister	12 November 1898	1898/99–1910/11	52
237	George Wilson	12 November 1898	1898/99	2
238	Warwick Armstrong	26 January 1899	1898/99–1921/22	82
239	William Carlton	26 January 1899	1898/99–1913/14	7
240	Alfred Carter	26 January 1899	1898/99–1899/1900	2
241	Albert Fox	26 January 1899	1898/99	1
242	Henry Hetherington	26 January 1899	1898/99	1
243	David Mailer	26 January 1899	1898/99–1902/03	5
244	Frank Tarrant	26 January 1899	1898/99–1925/26	12
245	George Honeybone	17 February 1899	1898/99	1
246	Frederick Collins	24 November 1899	1899/1900–1908/09	35
247	Jack Saunders	30 December 1899	1899/1900–1909/10	50

== 1900–1949 ==
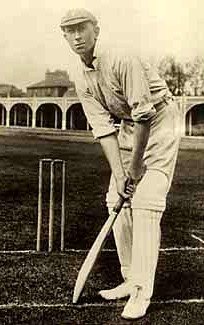
Jack Ryder

Victoria first-class cricketers
Number	Name	Debut	Career	Matches
248	James Ainslie	26 January 1900	1899/1900–1909/10	9
249	James Drew	26 January 1900	1899/1900	1
250	Walter Morgan	26 January 1900	1899/1900	1
251	William Perraton	26 January 1900	1899/1900	1
252	Mathew Ellis	24 January 1901	1900/01–1906/07	13
253	James Horan	24 January 1901	1900/01–1909/10	19
254	William McCormack	24 January 1901	1900/01–1901/02	2
255	Daniel Noonan	24 January 1901	1900/01–1902/03	5
256	Harry Wright	24 January 1901	1900/01–1904/05	3
257	John Woodford	22 February 1902	1901/02–1912/13	7
258	William Blundell	24 January 1903	1902/03	1
259	Bartholomew Grant	24 January 1903	1902/03–1904/05	2
260	Isaac Hopkins	24 January 1903	1902/03	1
261	Herb Howson	24 January 1903	1902/03	1
262	Leslie Rainey	24 January 1903	1902/03–1904/05	2
263	Bertie Tuckwell	31 January 1903	1902/03–1903/04	3
264	Elliott Monfries	27 February 1903	1902/03–1903/04	6
265	Charles Baker	20 November 1903	1903/04–1904/05	4
266	Barlow Carkeek	5 February 1904	1903/04–1914/15	53
267	Vernon Ransford	5 February 1904	1903/04–1927/28	75
268	William Scott	5 February 1904	1903/04–1911/12	16
269	Arthur Christian	4 March 1904	1903/04–1905/06	7
270	John Howlett	4 March 1904	1903/04	1
271	Robert Osborne	4 March 1904	1903/04–1904/05	4
272	John Garland	28 January 1905	1904/05	1
273	Edward Goss	28 January 1905	1904/05–1906/07	4
274	William McPetrie	28 January 1905	1904/05–1905/06	2
275	Frederick Vaughan	28 January 1905	1904/05–1910/11	11
276	Hughie Carroll	11 November 1905	1905/06–1923/24	36
277	Gerry Hazlitt	30 December 1905	1905/06–1910/11	16
278	Charles Jones	26 January 1906	1905/06	1
279	Thomas Rush	10 November 1906	1906/07–1907/08	8
280	Thomas Horan	29 December 1906	1906/07–1908/09	5
281	Les Vernon	25 January 1907	1906/07–1908/09	7
282	Pitre Desmazeures	22 February 1907	1906/07	1
283	Thomas Grant	22 February 1907	1906/07	1
284	Jimmy Matthews	22 February 1907	1906/07–1914/15	32
285	William Reeves	22 February 1907	1906/07–1909/10	3
286	Colin McKenzie	15 November 1907	1907/08–1912/13	21
287	Frederick Delves	1 February 1908	1907/08–1910/11	10
288	Gerald Healy	1 February 1908	1907/08–1914/15	6
289	Norman Speirs	1 February 1908	1907/08–1909/10	2
290	William Kelly	28 February 1908	1907/08	1
291	James Kyle	28 February 1908	1907/08–1911/12	16
292	Leonard Smith	28 February 1908	1907/08	2
293	Dave Smith	23 January 1909	1908/09–1911/12	19
294	Herbert Parsons	12 February 1909	1908/09–1910/11	5
295	Allie Lampard	19 February 1909	1908/09–1921/22	18
296	Bill Sewart	27 December 1909	1909/10–1918/19	11
297	Arthur Kenny	1 January 1910	1909/10–1910/11	12
298	Bert Kortlang	26 January 1910	1909/10–1911/12	17
299	James Binney	29 January 1910	1909/10	1
300	Harold Hart	29 January 1910	1909/10–1914/15	10
301	Chris Kiernan	29 January 1910	1909/10–1918/19	10
302	Timothy Scannell	26 February 1910	1909/10	2
303	Gordon Johnstone	5 March 1910	1909/10–1912/13	3
304	Ashley Facy	11 November 1910	1910/11–1912/13	4
305	Arnold Seitz	11 November 1910	1910/11–1912/13	15
306	Leslie Miller	16 December 1910	1910/11	1
307	Frank Pitcher	3 February 1911	1910/11	1
308	Norman Brown	3 November 1911	1911/12–1914/15	11
309	William Macrow	3 November 1911	1911/12–1912/13	5
310	Albert Hartkopf	23 December 1911	1911/12–1928/29	40
311	Ted McDonald	26 January 1912	1911/12–1921/22	22
312	Fred Baring	2 February 1912	1911/12–1928/29	30
313	Ernest Spencer	2 February 1912	1911/12–1912/13	2
314	Lee Braid	16 February 1912	1911/12–1921/22	5
315	Christopher Dwyer	16 February 1912	1911/12–1912/13	3
316	Arthur Liddicut	16 February 1912	1911/12–1932/33	54
317	Jack Ryder	1 November 1912	1912/13–1931/32	80
318	Edward Boulter	20 November 1912	1912/13	1
319	Edmund Carroll	20 November 1912	1912/13	4
320	Walter Delves	20 November 1912	1912/13	1
321	Charles Hendrie	20 November 1912	1912/13	1
322	Mortimer Hotchin	20 November 1912	1912/13–1914/15	4
323	Roy Park	20 November 1912	1912/13–1924/25	35
324	Horace Sandford	20 November 1912	1912/13–1930/31	10
325	William Cannon	26 December 1912	1912/13–1913/14	7
326	Leonard McNaughton	26 December 1912	1912/13–1919/20	8
327	Herbert Bracher	24 January 1913	1912/13–1921/22	7
328	Rowland Bailey	24 January 1913 #	1912/13	1
329	Paddy Shea	24 January 1913 #	1912/13–1919/20	3
330	Harry Smith	24 January 1913 #	1912/13	1
331	Percival Heather	9 January 1914	1913/14	1
332	Frank Lugton	9 January 1914	1913/14	5
333	Carl Willis	9 January 1914	1913/14–1928/29	36
334	John Fitzpatrick	13 February 1914	1913/14	1
335	Vernon Souter	13 February 1914	1913/14–1914/15	8
336	Albert Brown	27 February 1914	1913/14–1922/23	6
337	Bert Ironmonger	27 February 1914	1913/14–1933/34	61
338	Ben Sheppard	27 February 1914	1913/14	2
339	Stanley Stephens	27 February 1914	1913/14–1914/15	3
340	Bertram Cohen	6 March 1914	1913/14–1933/34	4
341	Bill Allen	1 January 1915	1914/15	2
342	Leslie Cody	23 January 1915	1914/15–1921/22	8
343	Frank Hyett	29 January 1915	1914/15–1918/19	3
344	Robert Junor	29 January 1915	1914/15	1
345	William Woodbury	29 January 1915	1914/15	1
346	Frederick Yeomans	29 January 1915	1914/15	1
347	John Ellis	26 December 1918	1918/19–1929/30	72
348	Philip Le Couteur	26 December 1918	1918/19	3
349	Edgar Mayne	26 December 1918	1918/19–1925/26	43
350	Leslie Keating	1 January 1919	1918/19–1924/25	16
351	George Truman	1 January 1919	1918/19	1
352	Clarrie Grimmett	25 January 1919	1918/19–1923/24	5
353	Basil Onyons	25 January 1919	1918/19–1928/29	11
354	Leslie Ferguson	2 January 1920	1919/20–1923/24	4
355	Tom Carlton	16 January 1920	1919/20–1923/24	7
356	Leslie Freemantle	24 January 1920	1919/20–1923/24	5
357	Archibald Dean	31 January 1920	1919/20	1
358	Johnny Moyes	27 February 1920	1919/20–1920/21	2
359	Leonard Mullett	27 February 1920	1919/20–1928/29	6
360	George Davies	4 February 1921	1920/21–1931/32	5
361	Bill Ponsford	4 February 1921	1920/21–1933/34	55
362	Frank O'Keeffe	26 January 1922	1921/22	3
363	Jim Atkinson	14 February 1922	1921/22–1925/26	4
364	Arthur Dummett	14 February 1922	1921/22	1
365	Clifford Monohan	14 February 1922	1921/22	1
366	Stanley Rimington	14 February 1922	1921/22	1
367	Edward Tolhurst	14 February 1922	1921/22–1930/31	8
368	Percival Wallace	14 February 1922	1921/22–1926/27	25
369	Matias Schade	24 February 1922	1921/22	1
370	Bill Woodfull	24 February 1922	1921/22–1933/34	59
371	Walter McDonald	10 March 1922	1921/22	1
372	William Bailey	2 February 1923	1922/23–1926/27	3
373	Herbert Gamble	2 February 1923	1922/23–1928/29	7
374	Robert Herring	2 February 1923	1922/23–1923/24	2
375	Albert Lansdown	2 February 1923	1922/23–1929/30	8
376	Hammy Love	2 February 1923	1922/23–1926/27	16
377	James Mathers	2 February 1923	1922/23	1
378	Karl Schneider	2 February 1923	1922/23–1924/25	2
379	Henry De Gruchy	21 February 1924	1923/24	1
380	Hans Ebeling	21 February 1924	1923/24–1937/38	44
381	William Johnson	21 February 1924	1923/24	1
382	Harold Lansdown	21 February 1924	1923/24–1928/29	3
383	Howard Richardson	21 February 1924	1923/24	1
384	Clive Sindrey	21 February 1924	1923/24–1929/30	8
385	William Wilkinson	21 February 1924	1923/24–1930/31	10
386	Stan Wootton	21 February 1924	1923/24	1
387	Hunter Hendry	31 October 1924	1924/25–1932/33	41
388	Don Blackie	24 January 1925	1924/25–1932/33	33
389	Keith Millar	30 January 1925	1924/25–1932/33	14
390	William Rayson	30 January 1925	1924/25–1928/29	6
391	Harold Austin	20 February 1925	1924/25	6
392	Ernest Austen	27 February 1925	1924/25–1929/30	9
393	Bryan Cosgrave	18 December 1925	1925/26–1931/32	4
394	Norman Mitchell	18 December 1925	1925/26–1926/27	4
395	Alan O. Thomson	1 January 1926	1925/26	1
396	Stuart King	17 December 1926	1926/27–1932/33	12
397	Frank Morton	17 December 1926	1926/27–1931/32	18
398	Keith Rigg	17 December 1926	1926/27–1938/39	71
399	Len Darling	25 January 1927	1926/27–1936/37	47
400	James Makin	25 January 1927	1926/27–1929/30	5
401	Charles Morgan	25 January 1927	1926/27	1
402	John Scaife	25 January 1927	1926/27–1935/36	42
403	Frank Warne	25 January 1927	1926/27–1928/29	2
404	Bert Davie	26 January 1927	1926/27	1
405	Charles Salvana	26 January 1927	1926/27	1
406	Ted a'Beckett	31 December 1927	1927/28–1931/32	25
407	Thomas Armstrong	31 December 1927	1927/28	1
408	Alan Davidson	31 December 1927	1927/28–1930/31	4
409	Reg Ellis	31 December 1927	1927/28–1929/30	7
410	Walter Reddrop	31 December 1927	1927/28–1928/29	2
411	Horace Hunt	25 February 1928	1927/28–1929/30	2
412	Lisle Nagel	3 March 1928	1927/28–1933/34	10
413	Frederick Chapman	14 December 1928	1928/29–1930/31	4
414	Thomas Bird	24 January 1929	1928/29	3
415	Harry Alexander	19 February 1929	1928/29–1933/34	27
416	Gordon Bennetts	19 February 1929	1928/29	1
417	Peter Gibaud	19 February 1929	1928/29	1
418	Herbert Guthrie	19 February 1929	1928/29–1929/30	2
419	Richard Wootton	19 February 1929	1928/29–1929/30	2
420	Hugh Baring	26 December 1929	1929/30	2
421	Ben Barnett	26 December 1929	1929/30–1946/47	73
422	Percy Chivers	26 December 1929	1929/30	3
423	Ernie McCormick	26 December 1929	1929/30–1938/39	43
424	Leo O'Brien	26 December 1929	1929/30–1937/38	40
425	Jack Perraton	26 December 1929	1929/30–1930/31	4
426	Josiah Thomas	26 December 1929	1929/30–1932/33	8
427	Dick Hassett	17 January 1930	1929/30–1931/32	8
428	Len Junor	17 January 1930	1929/30–1937/38	8
429	William Muir	17 January 1930	1929/30	1
430	Walter Wedgwood	17 January 1930	1929/30	1
431	Hec Oakley	14 February 1930	1929/30–1938/39	28
432	Jack Barnes	17 February 1930	1929/30	1
433	Robert Nettleton	17 February 1930	1929/30–1930/31	2
434	Heinrich Schrader	17 February 1930	1929/30–1930/31	2
435	Walter Scott	17 February 1930	1929/30	1
436	Laurence Cordner	1 January 1931	1930/31–1933/34	3
437	George Eaton	21 January 1931	1930/31	4
438	Percy Ellis	21 January 1931	1930/31	3
439	Frederick Fontaine	21 January 1931	1930/31–1931/32	6
440	Edwin Healy	21 January 1931	1930/31–1931/32	5
441	Robert Lawson	21 January 1931	1930/31	2
442	Stanley Quin	21 January 1931	1930/31–1937/38	24
443	John Rush	31 January 1931	1930/31	2
444	Alan McInnes	23 February 1931	1930/31	1
445	George Newstead	23 February 1931	1930/31–1935/36	8
446	Ian Lee	18 December 1931	1931/32–1940/41	51
447	Stanley Smith	18 December 1931	1931/32–1935/36	14
448	Chuck Fleetwood-Smith	25 December 1931	1931/32–1939/40	51
449	Joe Kinnear	25 December 1931	1931/32	2
450	Fred Jinks	30 December 1931	1931/32	1
451	Emmet Lanigan	15 March 1932	1931/32	1
452	Vernon Nagel	11 November 1932	1932/33–1935/36	4
453	Ernest Bromley	23 December 1932	1932/33–1938/39	22
454	John Francis	29 December 1932	1932/33	3
455	Leonard Kemp	29 December 1932	1932/33–1933/34	5
456	Joseph Plant	29 December 1932	1932/33–1936/37	20
457	John Stanes	29 December 1932	1932/33–1937/38	5
458	Jack Stephens	29 December 1932	1932/33–1937/38	3
459	Edward Vernon	2 January 1933	1932/33–1935/36	10
460	Lindsay Hassett	10 February 1933	1932/33–1952/53	73
461	William Cornelius	14 March 1933	1932/33	1
462	Walter Stalker	14 March 1933	1932/33	1
463	Arthur Allsopp	23 December 1933	1933/34–1934/35	5
464	Percy Beames	23 December 1933	1933/34–1945/46	18
465	Dudley Fitzmaurice	23 December 1933	1933/34–1938/39	4
466	Ivan Miller	23 December 1933	1933/34–1935/36	4
467	Thomas Trembath	23 December 1933	1933/34	3
468	George Hawkins	29 December 1933	1933/34	1
469	Edward Cleary	6 February 1934	1933/34	3
470	Edward Gunston	6 February 1934	1933/34	3
471	Thomas Leather	6 February 1934	1933/34–1934/35	4
472	Charles Gardner	15 February 1934	1933/34	2
473	Ross Gregory	15 February 1934	1933/34- 1938/39	27
474	Morris Sievers	15 February 1934	1933/34–1945/46	41
475	Harold Britt	5 February 1935	1934/35–1935/36	3
476	Robert Dempster	5 February 1935	1934/35–1940/41	8
477	Jack Ledward	5 February 1935	1934/35–1938/39	21
478	William Welch	24 December 1935	1935/36	4
479	Vallancey Brown	31 December 1935	1935/36	1
480	Roy Gardner	31 December 1935	1935/36	3
481	Ian Johnson	31 December 1935	1935/36–1955/56	77
482	Henry Kroger	31 December 1935	1935/36	2
483	Barry Scott	31 December 1935	1935/36–1939/40	17
484	John Watmuff	31 December 1935	1935/36	2
485	William Wilson	31 December 1935	1935/36	3
486	Lester Wynne	31 December 1935	1935/36	2
487	Harry Zachariah	31 December 1935	1935/36	2
488	Allan Jinks	3 January 1936	1935/36–1947/48	8
489	Everard Baker	24 February 1936	1935/36–1948/49	24
490	Frank Deveney	24 February 1936	1935/36–1937/38	4
491	John Frederick	24 February 1936	1935/36–1936/37	3
492	Horace Grangel	24 February 1936	1935/36	1
493	Bill Kinnear	24 February 1936	1935/36	1
494	Eddy Williams	24 February 1936	1935/36	1
495	William Wilson	24 February 1936	1935/36	1
496	William Pearson	18 December 1936	1936/37–1937/38	13
497	Laurie Nash	19 February 1937	1936/37	1
498	Maxwell Rayson	17 November 1937	1937/38	3
499	Francis Sides	17 November 1937	1937/38–1938/39	14
500	Frank Thorn	29 November 1937	1937/38–1938/39	7
501	Alfred Andrew-Street	1 February 1938	1937/38	1
502	Harcourt Dowsley	1 February 1938	1937/38–1946/47	5
503	Jack Lowry	1 February 1938	1937/38	1
504	George Meikle	1 February 1938	1937/38–1940/41	7
505	Keith Miller	1 February 1938	1937/38–1946/47	18
506	Herbie Smith	1 February 1938	1937/38	1
507	Tom Tuttle	1 February 1938	1937/38–1946/47	3
508	Doug Ring	23 December 1938	1938/39–1952/53	67
509	Des Fothergill	26 December 1938	1938/39–1948/49	27
510	Gordon Tamblyn	24 February 1939	1938/39–1946/47	21
511	Walter Dudley	13 December 1940	1940/41	4
512	Merv Harvey	18 January 1941	1940/41–1948/49	20
513	Keith Sarovich	18 January 1941	1940/41	3
514	William Cockburn	14 December 1945	1945/46	1
515	Fred Freer	14 December 1945	1945/46–1947/48	21
516	Bill Johnston	14 December 1945	1945/46–1954/55	56
517	Ken Meuleman	14 December 1945	1945/46–1950/51	39
518	Keith Stackpole Sr	14 December 1945	1945/46–1949/50	20
519	George Tribe	14 December 1945	1945/46–1946/47	13
520	Ronald Walker	18 January 1946	1945/46–1946/47	4
521	Jack Hill	8 March 1946	1945/46–1955/56	38
522	Sam Loxton	19 December 1946	1946/47–1957/58	77
523	George Thoms	19 December 1946	1946/47–1953/54	18
524	Norman Blundell	25 December 1946	1946/47–1951/52	8
525	Lewis Carter	25 December 1946	1946/47–1953/54	5
526	Walter Driver	25 December 1946	1946/47	2
527	Neil Harvey	25 December 1946	1946/47–1956/57	64
528	Roy Howard	25 December 1946	1946/47–1950/51	24
529	David Kerr	25 December 1946	1946/47–1953/54	16
530	Harry Lambert	25 December 1946	1946/47–1953/54	18
531	Len Maddocks	25 December 1946	1946/47–1961/62	66
532	Ernest McIntyre	25 December 1946	1946/47	2
533	Herbert Numa	30 December 1946	1946/47–1953/54	16
534	William Dick	1 March 1947	1946/47–1956/57	18
535	Desmond Fitzmaurice	14 November 1947	1947/48	2
536	Ray Harvey	21 November 1947	1947/48–1959/60	38
537	Jack Daniel	27 January 1948	1947/48–1950/51	7
538	Jack Green	27 January 1948	1947/48–1948/49	3
539	Colin McDonald	20 February 1948	1947/48–1962/63	60
540	Clive Fairbairn	10 December 1948	1948/49	1
541	Mick Harvey	10 December 1948	1948/49	3
542	Jim Baird	25 December 1948	1948/49–1949/50	10
543	Richard Maddocks	25 December 1948	1948/49–1956/57	21
544	Ian McDonald	25 December 1948	1948/49–1952/53	39
545	Keith Rawle	25 December 1948	1948/49	1
546	Herb Turner	4 February 1949	1948/49–1950/51	12
547	Jack Iverson	25 November 1949	1949/50–1952/53	18

== 1950–1999 ==
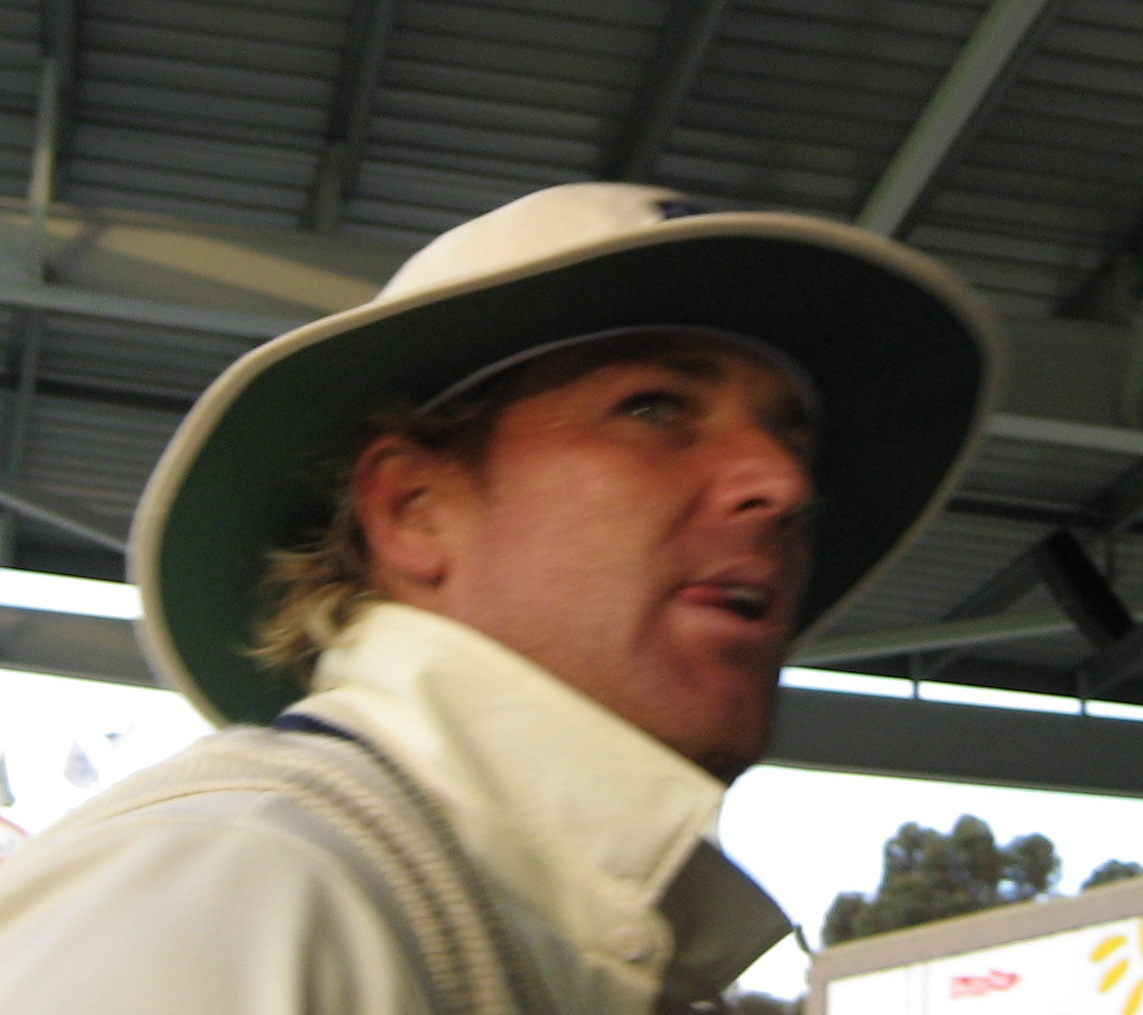
Shane Warne

Victoria first-class cricketers
Number	Name	Debut	Career	Matches
548	John Chambers	24 January 1950	1949/50–1954/55	27
549	Bernard Considine	24 January 1950	1949/50–1952/53	6
550	John Leehane	24 January 1950	1949/50	1
551	Harold Shillinglaw	24 January 1950	1949/50–1953/54	3
552	John Watters	24 January 1950	1949/50	1
553	Jack Wilson	24 January 1950	1949/50	1
554	Bert Wright	24 January 1950	1949/50–1950/51	3
555	Donald Allen	18 December 1950	1950/51–1951/52	5
556	Michael Fitchett	18 December 1950	1950/51–1952/53	13
557	Val Holten	18 December 1950	1950/51–1952/53	5
558	Thomas Perrin	18 December 1950	1950/51	2
559	Marshall Dillon	22 December 1950	1950/51–1951/52	3
560	John Cordner	25 January 1952	1951/52	3
561	Geoffrey Cormack	25 January 1952	1951/52–1953/54	5
562	Thomas Crow	5 February 1952	1951/52	1
563	Jeff Hallebone	5 February 1952	1951/52–1955/56	18
564	Neil Smyth	5 February 1952	1951/52–1953/54	3
565	Bruce Vawser	5 February 1952	1951/52	1
566	Arthur Dean	27 February 1953	1952/53–1956/57	5
567	John Power	18 December 1953	1953/54–1959/60	25
568	Donald Mathieson	26 December 1953	1953/54	2
569	John Salmon	26 December 1953	1953/54–1958/59	15
570	John Shaw	26 December 1953	1953/54–1960/61	48
571	Ian Huntington	31 December 1953	1953/54–1963/64	46
572	Arthur Day	14 January 1955	1954/55–1956/57	4
573	Keith Kendall	11 February 1955	1954/55–1959/60	17
574	John Edwards	9 December 1955	1955/56–1959/60	32
575	Lindsay Kline	3 February 1956	1955/56–1961/62	31
576	Bill Lawry	10 February 1956	1955/56–1971/72	99
577	Les Botham	9 November 1956	1956/57–1959/60	8
578	James Cosgrave	9 November 1956	1956/57	3
579	Ian Meckiff	9 November 1956	1956/57–1963/64	37
580	Geoffrey Longney	23 November 1956	1956/57	1
581	Noel Allanson	22 January 1957	1956/57	1
582	Ronald Furlong	22 January 1957	1956/57–1962/63	31
583	Lewis Germaine	22 January 1957	1956/57–1959/60	8
584	Donald Green	22 January 1957	1956/57	1
585	Jack Potter	22 January 1957	1956/57–1967/68	81
586	Ian Quick	22 January 1957	1956/57–1961/62	34
587	Barry Stevens	26 January 1957	1956/57–1957/58	5
588	Allen Aylett	8 November 1957	1957/58–1958/59	11
589	Neil Crompton	8 November 1957	1957/58–1962/63	45
590	Bruce Murray	25 January 1958	1957/58	4
591	Peter Hosking	21 February 1958	1957/58	1
592	Noel Shaw	28 February 1958	1957/58	1
593	Trevor Hart	1 January 1959	1958/59	1
594	Bruce Tozer	1 January 1959	1958/59	1
595	Colin Guest	9 January 1959	1958/59–1963/64	27
596	Alan Connolly	20 November 1959	1959/60–1970/71	83
597	John Wildsmith	27 November 1959	1959/60–1962/63	10
598	Peter Bailey	8 January 1960	1959/60	1
599	Norman Emerson	8 January 1960	1959/60–1966/67	4
600	Keith Stackpole	8 January 1960	1959/60–1973/74	75
601	Bob Cowper	12 January 1960	1959/60–1969/70	66
602	Ken Eastwood	19 February 1960	1959/60–1971/72	41
603	Ray Jordon	19 February 1960	1959/60–1970/71	79
604	Ron Gaunt	18 November 1960	1960/61–1963/64	18
605	Keith Kirby	27 January 1961	1960/61–1969/70	25
606	David Anderson	30 December 1961	1961/62–1968/69	37
607	Ian Redpath	30 December 1961	1961/62–1975/76	92
608	Norman Carlyon	19 February 1962	1961/62–1969/70	11
609	Lindsay Davison	19 February 1962	1961/62	1
610	Rex Harry	19 February 1962	1961/62	1
611	Eddie Illingworth	19 February 1962	1961/62–1964/65	5
612	Ian Langford	19 February 1962	1961/62	1
613	Ian Law	19 February 1962	1961/62–1963/64	4
614	Kenneth Walker	19 February 1962	1961/62	1
615	Neville West	19 February 1962	1961/62–1962/63	9
616	Graham Whitford	23 February 1962	1961/62–1962/63	2
617	William O'Halloran	14 December 1962	1962/63–1963/64	6
618	John Smith	17 January 1964	1963/64	1
619	Graham Brown	24 January 1964	1963/64	1
620	John Salvado	24 January 1964	1963/64	4
621	John Grant	6 November 1964	1964/65–1968/69	43
622	Brian Porter	6 November 1964	1964/65	1
623	Roger Rayson	6 November 1964	1964/65–1966/67	18
624	Graeme Watson	6 November 1964	1964/65–1970/71	40
625	Alan Doble	26 December 1964	1964/65–1965/66	5
626	Peter Williams	5 November 1965	1965/66	4
627	David Cowper	19 November 1965	1965/66	2
628	Paul Sheahan	23 December 1965	1965/66–1973/74	47
629	John Swanson	7 January 1966	1965/66–1969/70	29
630	Bruce Thomas	28 January 1966	1965/66–1969/70	13
631	Bob Bitmead	29 October 1966	1966/67–1967/68	12
632	Les Joslin	29 October 1966	1966/67–1969/70	30
633	Eric Shade	29 October 1966	1966/67–1969/70	5
634	Peter Bedford	4 November 1966	1966/67–1972/73	39
635	Edward a'Beckett	18 November 1966	1966/67	1
636	Nigel Murch	30 December 1966	1966/67–1969/70	10
637	Russell Cook	1 November 1968	1968/69	7
638	Russell Sincock	25 January 1969	1968/69	2
639	Alan Thomson	25 January 1969	1968/69–1974/75	35
640	Gregory Blair	14 February 1969	1968/69	1
641	John Scholes	14 February 1969	1968/69–1981/82	62
642	Max Walker	14 February 1969	1968/69–1981/82	70
643	Robert Rowan	14 November 1969	1969/70–1972/73	11
644	Blair Campbell	12 December 1969	1969/70	8
645	Alan Sieler	6 February 1970	1969/70–1976/77	39
646	John Ward	13 February 1970	1969/70	1
647	Jim Higgs	30 October 1970	1970/71–1982/83	83
648	John Stephens	11 December 1970	1970/71–1971/72	4
649	Les Stillman	11 December 1970	1970/71–1975/76	18
650	Ross Duncan	29 October 1971	1971/72–1972/73	11
651	Richie Robinson	29 October 1971	1971/72–1981/82	76
652	Gary Cosier	26 November 1971	1971/72–1980/81	4
653	Robert Rose	10 December 1971	1971/72–1973/74	19
654	Alan Hurst	8 December 1972	1972/73–1980/81	50
655	Robert Baldry	23 December 1972	1972/73–1976/77	26
656	Graham Yallop	23 December 1972	1972/73–1984/85	87
657	Ray Bright	29 December 1972	1972/73–1987/88	114
658	Gary Living	29 December 1972	1972/73	4
659	Doug Gott	30 November 1973	1973/74	4
660	Geoff Tamblyn	8 November 1974	1974/75	1
661	Ron Nicholls	6 December 1974	1974/75	2
662	Paul Hibbert	15 February 1975	1974/75–1986/87	77
663	Trevor Laughlin	15 February 1975	1974/75–1980/81	51
664	Leigh Baker	31 October 1975	1975/76	5
665	John Douglas	19 December 1975	1975/76–1978/79	6
666	Colin Thwaites	16 January 1976	1975/76–1976/77	6
667	David Broad	5 March 1976	1975/76–1979/80	13
668	Graham Matthews	5 March 1976	1975/76–1980/81	21
669	Douglas Rolfe	5 March 1976	1975/76	1
670	Dav Whatmore	5 March 1976	1975/76–1988/89	95
671	Jeff Moss	29 October 1976	1976/77–1981/82	50
672	John Anderson	20 November 1976	1976/77	4
673	Ian Callen	20 November 1976	1976/77–1982/83	41
674	Col Costorphin	28 January 1977	1976/77–1977/78	3
675	Brendan McArdle	4 February 1977	1976/77–1978/79	11
676	Paul Melville	4 February 1977	1976/77–1978/79	11
677	Ian Maddocks	4 November 1977	1977/78–1981/82	22
678	Julien Wiener	4 November 1977	1977/78–1984/85	58
679	Gary Watts	23 December 1977	1977/78–1990/91	67
680	Peter Cox	10 February 1978	1977/78–1982/83	10
681	David Knight	10 February 1978	1977/78	1
682	Michael Taylor	17 February 1978	1977/78–1984/85	39
683	Graeme Ross	15 December 1978	1978/79–1979/80	7
684	John Leehane	30 December 1978	1978/79–1980/81	11
685	Braddon Green	26 January 1979	1978/79–1982/83	12
686	Shaun Graf	3 November 1979	1979/80–1984/85	29
687	Rod McCurdy	16 October 1981	1981/82–1983/84	24
688	Peter Davies	6 November 1981	1981/82–1982/83	6
689	Merv Hughes	15 January 1982	1981/82–1994/95	83
690	Dean Jones	29 January 1982	1981/82–1997/98	124
691	Peter Sacristani	29 January 1982	1981/82–1982/83	7
692	Peter King	22 October 1982	1982/83–1984/85	7
693	Rob Templeton	19 November 1982	1982/83	2
694	Leonard Balcam	4 December 1982	1982/83–1983/84	7
695	Geoff Richardson	4 December 1982	1982/83–1984/85	15
696	Geoff Miles	10 December 1982	1982/83–1983/84	9
697	David Shepherd	18 February 1983	1982/83	1
698	Simon Davis	11 November 1983	1983/84–1987/88	43
699	Warren Whiteside	11 November 1983	1983/84–1987/88	21
700	Andrew Wildsmith	11 November 1983	1983/84	2
701	Phil Hyde	18 November 1983	1983/84–1984/85	10
702	Tony Dodemaide	25 November 1983	1983/84–1997/98	105
703	David Emerson	2 December 1983	1983/84–1994/95	16
704	Michael Quinn	13 January 1984	1983/84–1988/89	31
705	Bruce Moir	27 January 1984	1983/84	3
706	Simon O'Donnell	24 February 1984	1983/84–1992/93	70
707	Rodney Hogg	26 October 1984	1984/85	2
708	Michael Dimattina	9 November 1984	1984/85–1989/90	67
709	David Robinson	30 November 1984	1984/85	3
710	Jamie Siddons	30 November 1984	1984/85–1990/91	72
711	Carey Smith	17 January 1985	1984/85	1
712	Peter Young	25 January 1985	1984/85–1989/90	22
713	Grant Jordan	22 February 1985	1984/85–1986/87	3
714	Richard McCarthy	22 February 1985	1984/85–1989/90	11
715	Denis Hickey	6 December 1985	1985/86–1989/90	13
716	Geoff Parker	6 December 1985	1985/86–1991/92	18
717	Colin Miller	18 January 1986	1985/86–2001/02	11
718	Paul Jackson	25 January 1986	1985/86–1991/92	39
719	Ian Frazer	5 November 1986	1986/87–1989/90	17
720	Warren Ayres	29 January 1988	1987/88–1996/97	46
721	Paul Reiffel	29 January 1988	1987/88–2001/02	92
722	Mark Osborne	4 November 1988	1988/89	7
723	Wayne Phillips	25 November 1988	1988/89–1993/94	57
724	Darren Walker	10 December 1988	1988/89	1
725	Peter McIntyre	10 March 1989	1988/89–1990/91	15
726	Damien Fleming	17 November 1989	1989/90–2001/02	78
727	Shaun Prescott	26 January 1990	1989/90	2
728	Craig Bradley	2 March 1990	1989/90	2
729	David Harris	2 March 1990	1989/90–1993/94	6
730	Darren Berry	9 November 1990	1990/91–2003/04	138
731	Darren Lehmann	9 November 1990	1990/91–1992/93	31
732	Alan Mullally	9 November 1990	1990/91	1
733	Craig White	16 November 1990	1990/91	2
734	Peter Smith	15 February 1991	1990/91	1
735	Shane Warne	15 February 1991	1990/91–2006/07	46
736	Darrin Ramshaw	7 March 1991	1990/91–1993/94	21
737	James Sutherland	14 March 1991	1990/91–1992/93	4
738	Geoff Allardice	1 November 1991	1991/92–1993/94	14
739	Gerard Dowling	1 November 1991	1991/92	2
740	Paul Nobes	20 December 1991	1991/92–1992/93	16
741	Neil Maxwell	4 February 1992	1991/92–1992/93	9
742	Laurie Harper	8 January 1993	1992/93–1999/2000	38
743	Peter Anderson	28 January 1993	1992/93	1
744	Simon Cook	28 January 1993	1992/93–1994/95	16
745	Matthew Elliott	3 February 1993	1992/93–2004/05	107
746	Craig Howard	3 February 1993	1992/93–1995/96	15
747	Anthony Amalfi	18 March 1993	1992/93	1
748	Brad Hodge	27 October 1993	1993/94–2009/10	147
749	Richard Herman	4 December 1993	1993/94	1
750	Paul Garlick	10 December 1993	1993/94	1
751	Kevin Neville	10 December 1993	1993/94	1
752	Rob Bartlett	18 December 1993	1993/94	1
753	Ian Harvey	18 December 1993	1993/94–2004/05	83
754	Steve McCooke	17 February 1994	1993/94	3
755	Ian Wrigglesworth	24 February 1994	1993/94–1994/95	5
756	Gerard Clarke	2 November 1994	1994/95	3
757	Troy Corbett	2 November 1994	1994/95–1996/97	13
758	Bryan Doyle	2 November 1994	1994/95–1995/96	6
759	Grant Gardiner	2 November 1994	1994/95–1997/98	20
760	Rohan Larkin	20 January 1995	1994/95–1996/97	16
761	David Saker	15 February 1995	1994/95–1999/2000	49
762	Brad Williams	15 February 1995	1994/95–1998/99	18
763	Jason Bakker	9 March 1995	1994/95–1999/2000	11
764	Michael Foster	16 March 1995	1994/95–1996/97	7
765	Paul Broster	19 October 1995	1995/96	2
766	Clinton Peake	24 November 1995	1995/96–2000/01	9
767	Graeme Vimpani	24 November 1995	1995/96–2000/01	30
768	Peter Roach	13 December 1995	1995/96–2004/05	25
769	John Davison	29 December 1995	1995/96–2000/01	31
770	Ian Hewett	13 February 1996	1995/96–2001/02	3
771	Brendan Ricci	8 March 1996	1995/96–1996/97	4
772	Adam McGinty	14 March 1996	1995/96–1996/97	2
773	Brad Stacey	14 March 1996	1995/96–1996/97	8
774	Brent Lodding	5 February 1997	1996/97	2
775	Adam Smith	5 February 1997	1996/97	3
776	Shawn Craig	7 March 1997	1996/97–2000/01	20
777	Shawn Flegler	19 December 1997	1997/98	2
778	Mathew Inness	7 January 1998	1997/98–2004/05	62
779	Ashley Robertson	23 January 1998	1997/98–1998/99	2
780	Jason Arnberger	3 February 1998	1997/98–2005/06	79
781	Peter Harper	3 February 1998	1997/98–2000/01	2
782	Matthew Mott	21 October 1998	1998/99–2003/04	49
783	David Shepard	21 October 1998	1998/99	1
784	Ashley Gilbert	5 December 1998	1998/99	2
785	Mick Lewis	9 December 1999	1999/2000–2006/07	60

== 21st century ==
Victoria first-class cricketers
Number	Name	Debut	Career	Matches
786	Michael Klinger	10 February 2000	1999/2000–2007/08	37
787	Ben Oliver	17 November 2000	2000/01	1
788	Jon Moss	9 March 2001	2000/01–2006/07	54
789	Cameron White	9 March 2001	2000/01–2018/19	138
790	Bryce McGain	25 January 2002	2001/02–2010/11	27
791	William Carr	17 February 2002	2001/02–2002/03	6
792	Andrew McDonald	17 February 2002	2001/02–2012/13	71
793	Nick Jewell	28 February 2002	2001/02–2010/11	62
794	Graeme Rummans	15 October 2002	2002/03–2005/06	17
795	Shane Harwood	30 October 2002	2002/03–2008/09	43
796	Rob Cassell	8 November 2002	2002/03	2
797	David Hussey	5 February 2003	2002/03–2014/15	109
798	Allan Wise	2 November 2003	2003/04–2007/08	29
799	Brett Harrop	25 November 2003	2003/04	1
800	Brendan Joseland	4 March 2004	2003/04–2004/05	2
801	Brad Knowles	23 November 2004	2004/05	1
802	Adam Crosthwaite	24 February 2005	2004/05–2007/08	26
803	Gerard Denton	4 November 2005	2005/06–2007/08	18
804	Lloyd Mash	11 November 2005	2005/06–2009/10	27
805	Peter Siddle	11 November 2005	2005/06–2024/25	72
806	Nathan Pilon	2 March 2006	2005/06	3
807	Dirk Nannes	10 March 2006	2005/06–2009/10	18
808	Clint McKay	24 November 2006	2006/07–2015/16	42
809	Darren Pattinson	26 January 2007	2006/07–2011/12	21
810	Rob Quiney	12 February 2007	2006/07-2016/17	88
811	Grant Lindsay	8 March 2007	2006/07	1
812	Matthew Wade	14 October 2007	2007/08-2016/17	77
813	Aiden Blizzard	10 December 2007	2007/08	2
814	Aaron Finch	20 December 2007	2007/08–2019/20	60
815	John Hastings	20 December 2007	2007/08-2016/17	44
816	Jon Holland	14 October 2008	2008/09-2022/23	80
817	Chris Rogers	14 October 2008	2008/09-2014/15	55
818	Damien Wright	21 October 2008	2008/09-2010/11	22
819	James Pattinson	21 November 2008	2008/09-2021/22	45
820	Steve Gilmour	26 February 2009	2008/09-2010/11	3
821	Will Sheridan	18 December 2009	2009/10-2012/13	12
822	Michael Hill	22 February 2010	2009/10-2013/14	19
823	Mark Cleary	26 November 2010	2010/11	2
824	Ryan Carters	11 February 2011	2010/11-2012/13	11
825	Tom Stray	11 February 2011	2010/11	2
826	Glenn Maxwell	18 February 2011	2010/11-	44*
827	Jayde Herrick	3 March 2011	2010/11-2012/13	18
828	Alex Keath	10 March 2011	2010/11-2014/15	7
829	Peter Handscomb	11 October 2011	2011/12-	121*
830	Scott Boland	11 November 2011	2011/12-	100*
831	Louis Cameron	13 November 2012	2012/13	2
832	James Muirhead	24 January 2013	2012/13-2013/14	2
833	Fawad Ahmed	18 February 2013	2012/13-2017/18	43
834	Clive Rose	18 February 2013	2012/13	1
835	Marcus Stoinis	14 March 2013	2012/13-2016/17	33
836	Ryan Sidebottom	14 March 2013	2012/13	1
837	Dan Christian	30 October 2013	2013/14-2017/18	42
838	Jake Haberfield	22 November 2013	2013/14	2
839	Jake Reed	20 February 2014	2013/14-2016/17	6
840	Dean Russ	3 March 2014	2013/14	2
841	David King	31 October 2014	2014/15	2
842	Chris Tremain	31 October 2014	2014/15-2019/20	54
843	Travis Dean	28 October 2015	2015/16-2023/24	70
844	Aaron Ayre	14 November 2015	2015/16	2
845	Sam Harper	3 February 2016	2015/16-	68*
846	Ian Holland	3 February 2016	2015/16	1
847	Marcus Harris	25 October 2016	2016/17-	86*
848	Evan Gulbis	1 February 2017	2016/17	1
849	Will Pucovski	1 February 2017	2016/17-2023/24	30
850	Seb Gotch	25 February 2017	2016/17-2021/22	29
851	Matthew Short	24 November 2017	2017/18-	52*
852	Eamonn Vines	8 February 2018	2017/18-2019/20	5
853	Jackson Coleman	16 October 2018	2018/19	1
854	Andrew Fekete	16 October 2018	2018/19-2019/20	6
855	Nic Maddinson	7 December 2018	2018/19-2023/24	37
856	Jake Fraser-McGurk	12 November 2019	2019/20-2022/23	8
857	Will Sutherland	12 November 2019	2019/20-	52*
858	Wil Parker	14 February 2020	2019/20-2021/22	4
859	Jonathan Merlo	24 February 2020	2019/20-	10*
860	Zak Evans	30 October 2020	2020/21	1
861	Mitchell Perry	30 October 2020	2020/21-	48*
862	Simon Mackin	8 November 2020	2020/21	1
863	Todd Murphy	3 April 2021	2020/21-	31*
864	James Seymour	3 April 2021	2020/21-2021/22	5
865	Brody Couch	20 November 2021	2021/22	1
866	Xavier Crone	20 November 2021	2021/22-	6*
867	Cameron McClure	23 March 2022	2021/22-	11*
868	Fergus O'Neill	6 October 2022	2022/23-	36*
869	Ruwantha Kellapotha	17 October 2022	2022/23	2
870	Ashley Chandrasinghe	29 October 2022	2022/23-	13*
871	Sam Elliott	24 November 2022	2022/23-	17*
872	Campbell Kellaway	24 November 2022	2022/23-	36*
873	Jack Prestwidge	1 December 2022	2022/23	1
874	Doug Warren	16 November 2023	2023/24–	4*
875	Tom Rogers	8 October 2024	2024/25–	9*
876	Harry Dixon	8 February 2025	2024/25–	9*
877	Blake Macdonald	6 March 2025	2024/25–	7*
878	David Moody	15 March 2025	2024/25–	5*
879	Oliver Peake	15 March 2025	2024/25–	10*
880	Dylan Brasher	5 February 2026	2025/26–	3*

Correct up to end of 2025/26 Sheffield Shield
