= Maplestone =

Maplestone is a surname. Notable people with the surname include:

- Charlie Maplestone (1876–1937), a former Australian rules football player
- Henry Maplestone (1870–1949), an Australian cricket player
- Lyn Maplestone, an Australian film director, production manager at the Cinema and Photographic Branch from 1926
