= Peter Hosking =

Peter Hosking may refer to:

- Peter Hosking (cricketer) (born 1932), Australian cricketer
- Peter Hosking (actor) (born 1947), Australian actor and audiobook narrator
