= Michael Quinn (cricketer) =

Australian cricketer (born 1962)

Personal information
- Born: 2 July 1962 (age 64); Adelaide, Australia

Domestic team information
- Years: Team
- 1984-1989: Victoria
- Source: Cricinfo, 6 December 2015

Michael Quinn (born 2 July 1962) is an Australian former cricketer. He played 31 first-class cricket matches for Victoria between 1984 and 1989.

== See also ==
- List of Victoria first-class cricketers
