= Leonard McNaughton =

Australian cricketer

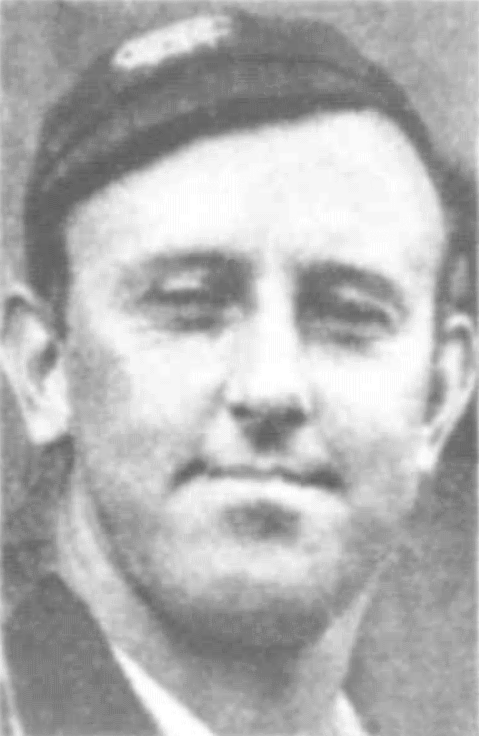

Personal information
- Born: 15 January 1884; Melbourne, Australia
- Died: 26 December 1970 (aged 86); Lower Kingswood, Surrey, England

Domestic team information
- Years: Team
- 1912-1920: Victoria
- Source: Cricinfo, 16 November 2015

Leonard McNaughton (15 January 1884 – 26 December 1970) was an Australian cricketer. He played eight first-class cricket matches for Victoria between 1912 and 1920. He played district cricket from 1911–12 to 1924-25 and took 334 wickets at an average of 17 mostly for East Melbourne. He was awarded life membership of the Hawthorn-East Melbourne Cricket Club in 1931.

== See also ==
- List of Victoria first-class cricketers
