= Warren Whiteside =

Australian cricketer (born 1961)

Personal information
- Born: 1 November 1961 (age 65); Melbourne, Australia

Domestic team information
- Years: Team
- 1983-1988: Victoria
- Source: Cricinfo, 6 December 2015

Warren Whiteside (born 1 November 1961) is an Australian former cricketer. He played 21 first-class cricket matches for Victoria between 1983 and 1988.

== See also ==
- List of Victoria first-class cricketers
