= Graeme Ross =

Australian cricketer (born 1955)

Personal information
- Born: 5 February 1955 (age 71); Geelong, Australia

Domestic team information
- Years: Team
- 1978-1980: Victoria
- Source: Cricinfo, 6 December 2015

Graeme Ross (born 5 February 1955) is an Australian former cricketer. He played seven first-class cricket matches for Victoria between 1978 and 1980.

== See also ==
- List of Victoria first-class cricketers
