= Rob Bartlett (cricketer) =

Australian cricketer (born 1972)

Personal information
- Born: 2 January 1972 (age 54); Melbourne, Australia

Domestic team information
- Years: Team
- 1993: Victoria
- Source: Cricinfo, 10 December 2015

Rob Bartlett (born 2 January 1972) is an Australian former cricketer. He played one first-class cricket match for Victoria in 1993.

== See also ==
- List of Victoria first-class cricketers
