= William Greaves (cricketer) =

Australian cricketer (1830–1869)

Personal information
- Born: 1830; England
- Died: 6 October 1869 (aged 38–39); Warrnambool, Australia

Domestic team information
- Years: Team
- 1863-1868: Victoria
- Source: Cricinfo, 3 May 2015

William Greaves (1830 – 6 October 1869) was an Australian cricketer. He played four first-class cricket matches for Victoria between 1863 and 1868.

== See also ==
- List of Victoria first-class cricketers
