= George Newstead =

Australian cricketer (1910–2000)

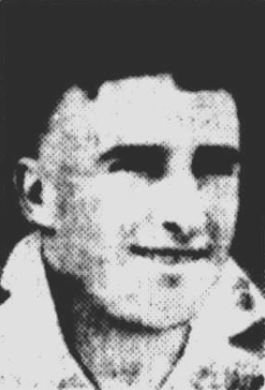

Personal information
- Born: 11 August 1910; Melbourne, Australia
- Died: 21 July 2000 (aged 89); Melbourne, Australia

Domestic team information
- Years: Team
- 1931-1936: Victoria
- Source: Cricinfo, 22 November 2015

George Newstead (11 August 1910 – 21 July 2000) was an Australian cricketer. He played eight first-class cricket matches for Victoria between 1931 and 1936.

== See also ==
- List of Victoria first-class cricketers
