= Pitre Desmazeures =

Australian cricketer

Personal information
- Born: 17 August 1880; Melbourne, Australia
- Died: 7 October 1942 (aged 62); New Norfolk, Tasmania, Australia

Domestic team information
- Years: Team
- 1907: Victoria
- Source: Cricinfo, 15 November 2015

Pitre Desmazeures (17 August 1880 – 7 October 1942) was an Australian cricketer. He played one first-class cricket match for Victoria in 1907 and one for South Australia in 1909/10.

== See also ==
- List of Victoria first-class cricketers
- List of South Australian representative cricketers
