= Vernon Souter =

Australian cricketer (1894–1915)

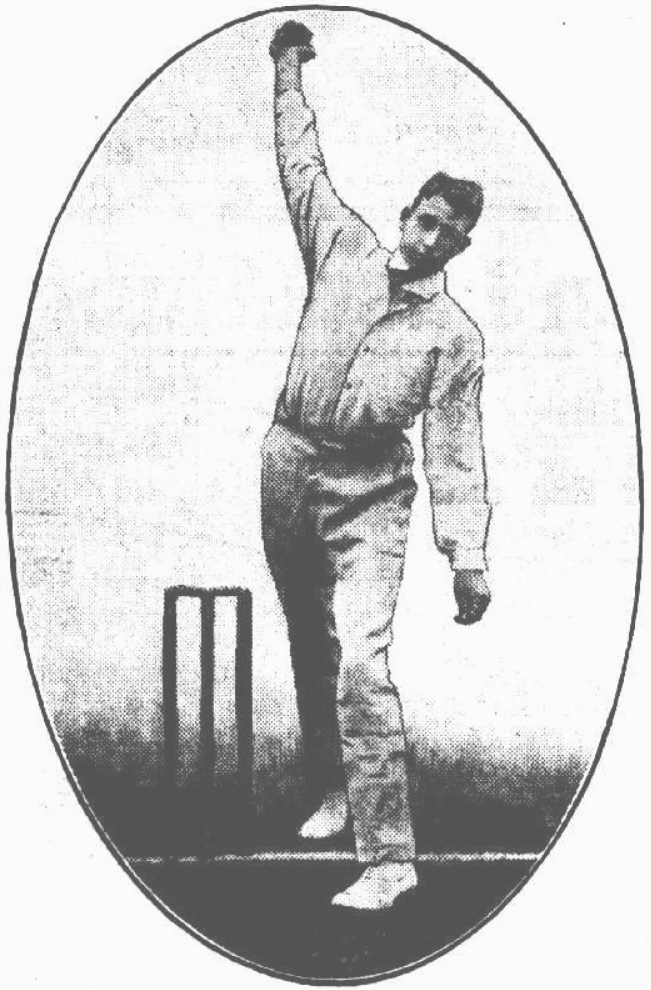

Personal information
- Born: 26 February 1894; Uranquinty, Australia
- Died: 17 July 1915 (aged 21); Melbourne, Australia

Domestic team information
- Years: Team
- 1914-1915: Victoria
- Source: Cricinfo, 18 November 2015

Vernon Souter (26 February 1894 – 17 July 1915) was an Australian cricketer. He played eight first-class cricket matches for Victoria between 1914 and 1915.

== See also ==
- List of Victoria first-class cricketers
