= Ernest Spencer (cricketer) =

Australian cricketer

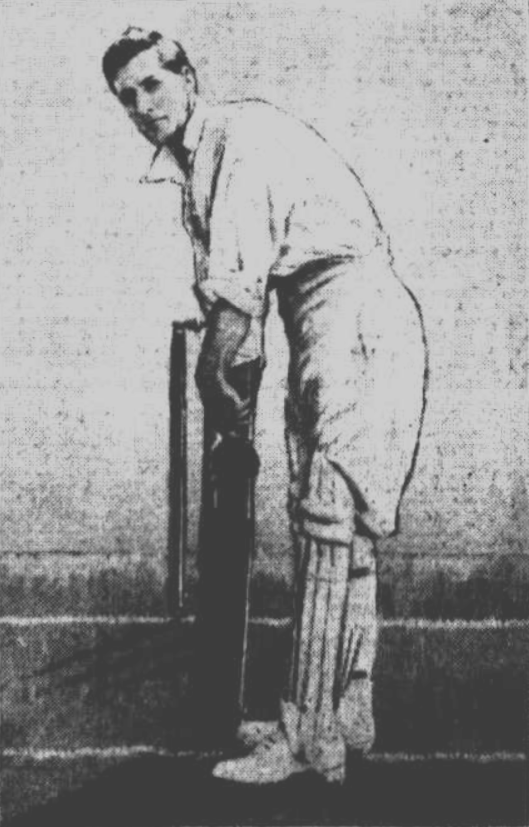

Personal information
- Born: 1 May 1888; Melbourne, Australia
- Died: 4 November 1953 (aged 65); Melbourne, Australia

Domestic team information
- Years: Team
- 1912: Victoria
- Source: Cricinfo, 16 November 2015

Ernest Spencer (1 May 1888 – 4 November 1953) was an Australian cricketer. He played two first-class cricket matches for Victoria in 1912.

Spencer began his cricket career playing district cricket for North Melbourne, being promoted to the First XI at the age of 16, and he achieved prominence in the 1911/12 season with a solid all-round performance averaging over 70 with the bat. In 1912, he was selected for Victoria as twelfth man against New South Wales and fielded for three days and he was selected to represent Victoria against the touring English team as part of the 1911/12 Ashes series in which he bowled twenty overs. After this he was not reselected and gave up ambitions of representing the State, shifting to playing matting cricket for Flemington & Kensington. He returned to playing district cricket for North Melbourne for the 1922/23 season but in 1925 returned to matting cricket.

== See also ==
- List of Victoria first-class cricketers
