= Henry Jennings (cricketer) =

Australian cricketer

Personal information
- Born: 9 April 1849; Launceston, Van Diemen's Land
- Died: 6 June 1925 (aged 76); Melbourne, Australia

Domestic team information
- Years: Team
- 1873: Victoria
- Source: Cricinfo, 6 June 2015

Henry Jennings (9 April 1849 – 6 June 1925) was an Australian cricketer. He played one first-class cricket match for Victoria in 1873.

== See also ==
- List of Victoria first-class cricketers
