= Walter Morgan (cricketer) =

Australian cricketer (1871–1941)

Personal information
- Born: 1 November 1871; Ballarat, Australia
- Died: 10 July 1941 (aged 69); Ballarat, Australia

Domestic team information
- Years: Team
- 1900: Victoria
- Source: Cricinfo, 31 July 2015

Walter Morgan (1 November 1871 – 10 July 1941) was an Australian cricketer. He played one first-class cricket match for Victoria against Tasmania in 1900.

He played competitive cricket for Ballarat for twenty-five years and in 1904 he set the Australian record for provincial grade cricket when he scored 1572 runs at an average of 72 for the season. It was suggested he may have represented Victoria more frequently if he had not remained living in the country. He was also a golfer, serving as secretary of the Ballarat Golf Club and winning the club's championship nine times, and bowls player representing the Ballarat Bowling Club in a team which won the 1924 Australian championship in Perth.

== See also ==
- List of Victoria first-class cricketers
