= J. B. Turner =

Australian cricketer

Personal information
- Full name: J. B. Turner

Domestic team information
- Years: Team
- 1865-1867: Victoria
- Source: Cricinfo, 3 May 2015

J. B. Turner was an Australian cricketer. He played two first-class cricket matches for Victoria between 1865 and 1867.

== See also ==
- List of Victoria first-class cricketers
