= Christopher Dwyer (cricketer) =

Australian cricketer

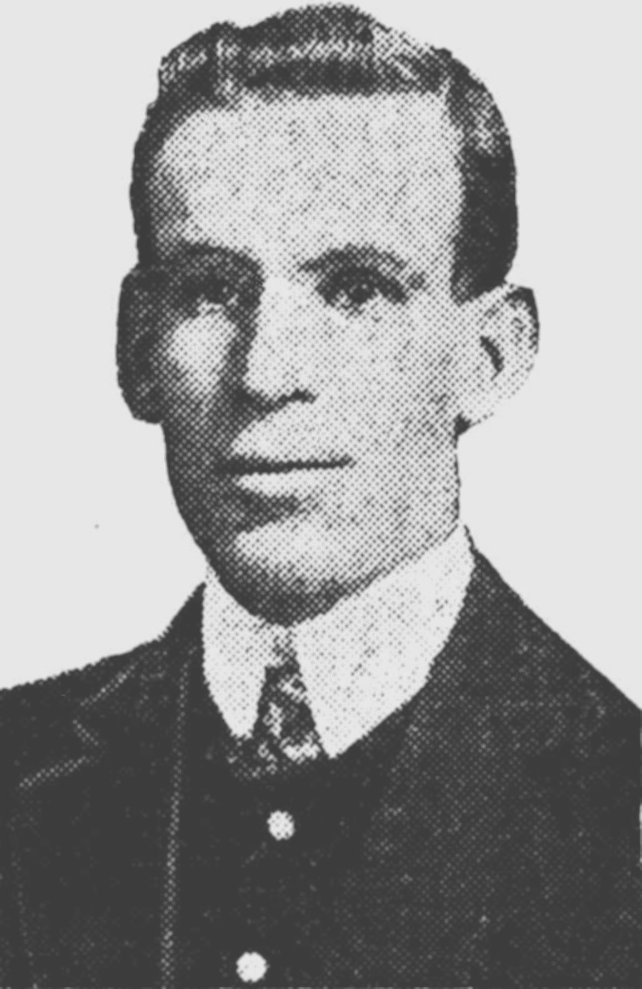

Personal information
- Died: 2 February 1945; Melbourne, Australia

Domestic team information
- Years: Team
- 1912: Victoria
- Source: Cricinfo, 16 November 2015

Christopher Dwyer (date of birth unknown, died 2 February 1945) was an Australian cricketer. He played three first-class cricket matches for Victoria in 1912.

== See also ==
- List of Victoria first-class cricketers
