= Len Junor =

Australian cricketer

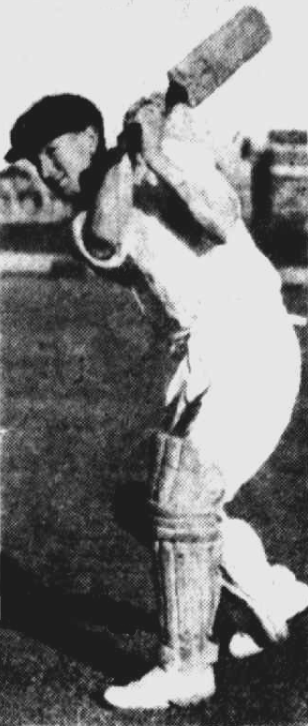

Personal information
- Full name: Leonard John Junor
- Born: 27 April 1914; Melbourne, Australia
- Died: 6 April 2005 (aged 90); Melbourne, Australia

Domestic team information
- Years: Team
- 1930-1938: Victoria
- Source: Cricinfo, 21 November 2015

Len Junor (27 April 1914 – 6 April 2005) was an Australian cricketer. He played eight first-class cricket matches for Victoria between 1930 and 1938.

== See also ==
- List of Victoria first-class cricketers
