= Mark Osborne (cricketer) =

Australian cricketer (born 1961)

Personal information
- Born: 8 October 1961 (age 65); Sydney, Australia

Domestic team information
- Years: Team
- 1988-1989: Victoria
- Source: Cricinfo, 9 December 2015

Mark Osborne (born 8 October 1961) is an Australian former cricketer. He played seven first-class cricket matches for Victoria between 1988 and 1989.

== See also ==
- List of Victoria first-class cricketers
