= William Darke (cricketer) =

Australian cricketer (1846–1925)

Personal information
- Born: 24 July 1846; Sydney, Australia
- Died: 24 January 1925 (aged 78); Elsternwick, Victoria, Australia

Domestic team information
- Years: Team
- 1871: Victoria
- Source: Cricinfo, 3 May 2015

William Darke (24 July 1846 – 24 January 1925) was an Australian cricketer. He played one first-class cricket match for Victoria in 1871.

== See also ==
- List of Victoria first-class cricketers
