= Walter Delves =

Australian cricketer

Personal information
- Born: 17 February 1891; Melbourne, Australia
- Died: 27 May 1955 (aged 64); Melbourne, Australia

Domestic team information
- Years: Team
- 1912: Victoria
- Source: Cricinfo, 16 November 2015

Walter Delves (17 February 1891 – 27 May 1955) was an Australian cricketer. He played one first-class cricket match for Victoria in 1912.

== See also ==
- List of Victoria first-class cricketers
