= Bruce Vawser =

Australian cricketer

Personal information
- Born: 17 June 1929; Melbourne, Australia
- Died: 1 May 2004 (aged 74); Melbourne, Australia

Domestic team information
- Years: Team
- 1952: Victoria
- Source: Cricinfo, 2 December 2015

Bruce Vawser (17 June 1929 – 1 May 2004) was an Australian cricketer. He played one first-class cricket match for Victoria in 1952. He also played for South Melbourne Cricket Club.

== See also ==
- List of Victoria first-class cricketers
