= Michael Foster (cricketer, born 1973) =

Australian cricketer (born 1973)

Personal information
- Full name: Michael Robert Foster
- Born: 5 March 1973 (age 53); Melbourne, Australia

Domestic team information
- Years: Team
- 1995-1997: Victoria
- Source: Cricinfo, 12 December 2015

Michael Foster (born 5 March 1973) is an Australian former cricketer. He played seven first-class cricket matches for Victoria between 1995 and 1997.

== See also ==
- List of Victoria first-class cricketers
