= Herbert Bracher =

Australian cricketer

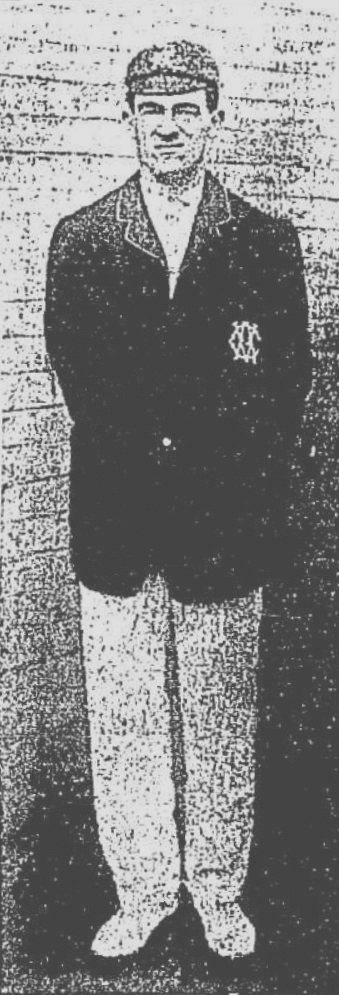

Personal information
- Born: 28 August 1886; Melbourne, Australia
- Died: 25 February 1974 (aged 87); Melbourne, Australia

Domestic team information
- Years: Team
- 1913-1922: Victoria
- Source: Cricinfo, 18 November 2015

Herbert Bracher (28 August 1886 – 25 February 1974) was an Australian cricketer. He played seven first-class cricket matches for Victoria between 1913 and 1922.

== See also ==
- List of Victoria first-class cricketers
