= Clive Sindrey =

Australian cricketer

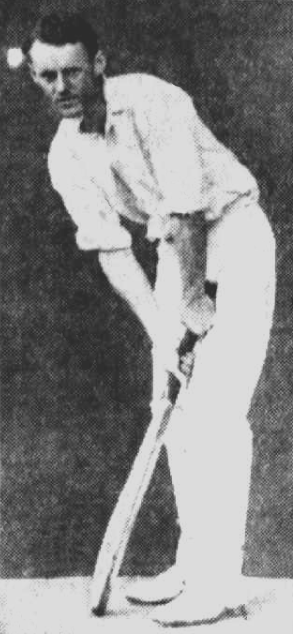

Personal information
- Born: 10 August 1903; Melbourne, Australia
- Died: 26 June 1981 (aged 77); Melbourne, Australia

Domestic team information
- Years: Team
- 1924-1930: Victoria
- Source: Cricinfo, 20 November 2015

Clive Sindrey (10 August 1903 – 26 June 1981) was an Australian cricketer. He played eight first-class cricket matches for Victoria between 1924 and 1930. He represented Richmond in district cricket from the age of fifteen and baseball from the age of sixteen. He fielded at short stop in baseball and was regarded as a talented covers fielder in cricket, and he credited his skill to baseball fielding.

== See also ==
- List of Victoria first-class cricketers
