= Edward Goss (cricketer) =

Australian cricketer

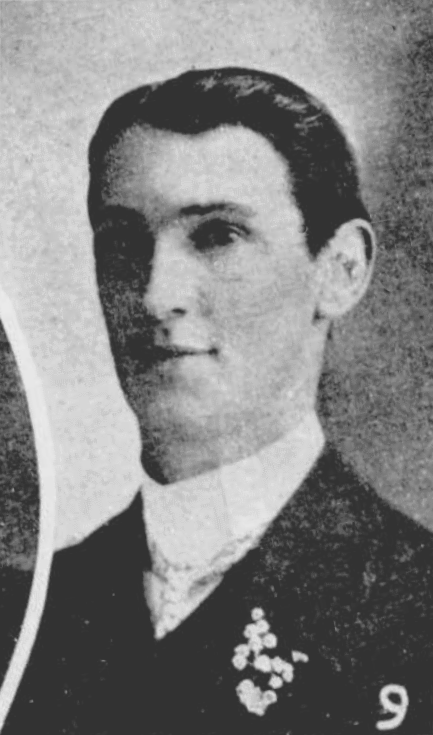

Personal information
- Born: 28 November 1875; Melbourne, Australia
- Died: 1 September 1955 (aged 79); Melbourne, Australia

Domestic team information
- Years: Team
- 1905-1907: Victoria
- Source: Cricinfo, 15 November 2015

Edward Goss (28 November 1875 – 1 September 1955) was an Australian cricketer. He played four first-class cricket matches for Victoria between 1905 and 1907.

== See also ==
- List of Victoria first-class cricketers
