= Noton Osborne =

Australian cricketer

Personal information
- Born: c. 1844; England
- Died: 10 December 1878 (aged 33–34); Hobart, Australia

Domestic team information
- Years: Team
- 1871: Victoria
- Source: Cricinfo, 3 May 2015

Noton Osborne (c. 1844 – 10 December 1878) was an Australian cricketer. He played one first-class cricket match for Victoria in 1871.

== See also ==
- List of Victoria first-class cricketers
