= George Honeybone =

Australian cricketer

Personal information
- Born: 2 April 1875; London, England
- Died: 1 November 1956 (aged 81); Melbourne, Australia

Domestic team information
- Years: Team
- 1899: Victoria
- Source: Cricinfo, 27 July 2015

George Honeybone (2 April 1875 – 1 November 1956) was an Australian cricketer. He played one first-class cricket match for Victoria in 1899.

== See also ==
- List of Victoria first-class cricketers
