= Archibald Dean =

Australian cricketer

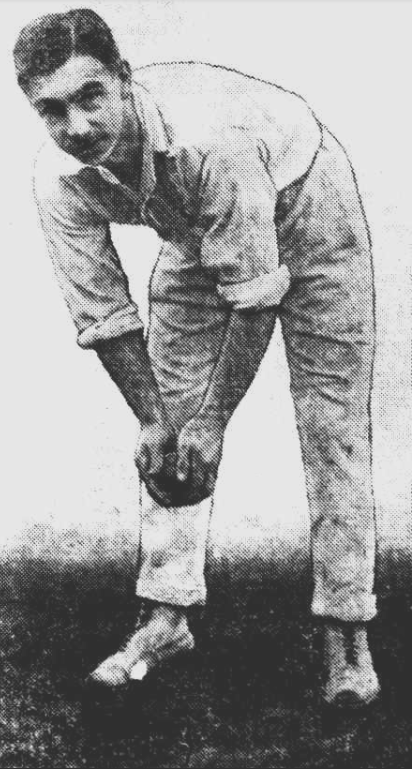

Personal information
- Born: 3 October 1886; Melbourne, Australia
- Died: 3 September 1939 (aged 52); Norfolk Island, Australia

Domestic team information
- Years: Team
- 1920: Victoria
- Source: Cricinfo, 19 November 2015

Archibald Dean (3 October 1886 – 3 September 1939) was an Australian cricketer. He played one first-class cricket match for Victoria in 1920. He also played for, and was captain of, Richmond Cricket Club, Melbourne. He also played football for Hawthorn Rovers.

== See also ==
- List of Victoria first-class cricketers
