= Edmund Carroll =

Australian cricketer

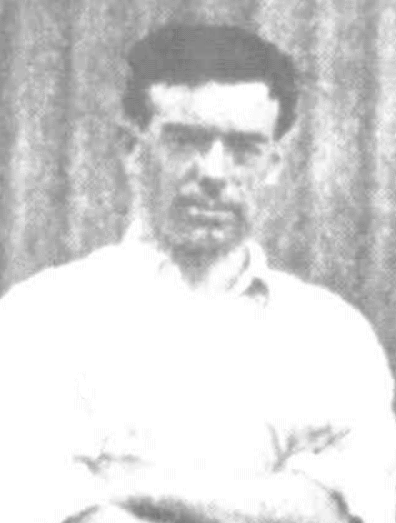

Personal information
- Born: 22 October 1886; Melbourne, Australia
- Died: 6 June 1959 (aged 72); Melbourne, Australia

Domestic team information
- Years: Team
- 1912: Victoria
- Source: Cricinfo, 16 November 2015

Edmund Carroll (22 October 1886 – 6 June 1959) was an Australian cricketer. He played four first-class cricket matches for Victoria in 1912.

== See also ==
- List of Victoria first-class cricketers
