= Thomas Armstrong (Australian cricketer) =

Australian cricketer

Personal information
- Born: 31 October 1889; Melbourne, Australia
- Died: 15 April 1963 (aged 73); Melbourne, Australia

Domestic team information
- Years: Team
- 1927: Victoria
- Source: Cricinfo, 21 November 2015

Thomas Armstrong (31 October 1889 – 15 April 1963) was an Australian cricketer. He played one first-class cricket match for Victoria in 1927.

== See also ==
- List of Victoria first-class cricketers
