= William Vint (cricketer) =

Australian cricketer

Personal information
- Born: 30 June 1851; Belfast, Ireland
- Died: 28 March 1897 (aged 45); Helen's Bay, Ireland

Domestic team information
- Years: Team
- 1885: Victoria
- Source: Cricinfo, 24 July 2015

William Vint (30 June 1851 – 28 March 1897) was an Australian cricketer. He played one first-class cricket match for Victoria in 1885.

== See also ==
- List of Victoria first-class cricketers
