= Robert Lawson (cricketer) =

Australian cricketer

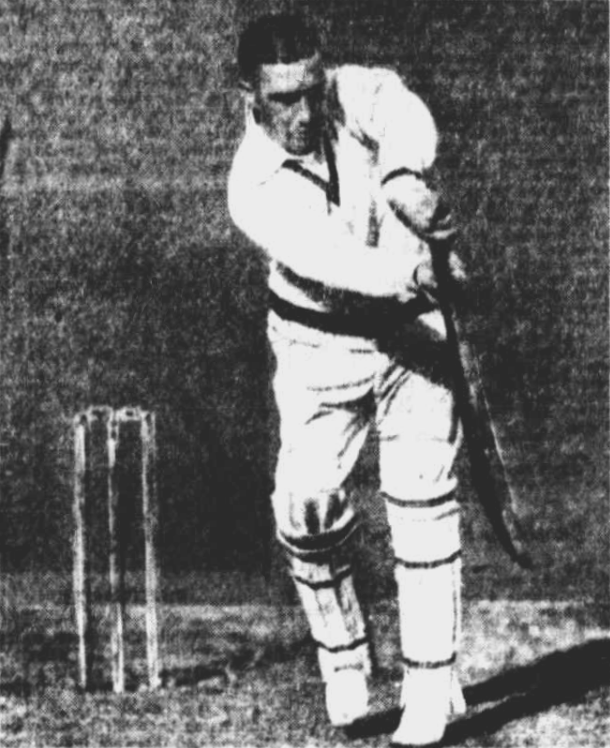

Personal information
- Born: 23 March 1901; Melbourne, Australia
- Died: 28 November 1974 (aged 73); Melbourne, Australia

Domestic team information
- Years: Team
- 1931: Victoria
- Source: Cricinfo, 22 November 2015

Robert Lawson (23 March 1901 – 28 November 1974) was an Australian cricketer. He played two first-class cricket matches for Victoria in 1931.

== See also ==
- List of Victoria first-class cricketers
