= Frederick Burchett =

Australian cricketer

Personal information
- Born: 27 April 1824; London, England
- Died: 16 July 1861 (aged 37); Melbourne, Australia

Domestic team information
- Years: Team
- 1858: Victoria
- Source: Cricinfo, 2 May 2015

Frederick Burchett (27 April 1824 – 16 July 1861) was an Australian cricketer. He played two first-class cricket matches for Victoria in 1858. He died in Melbourne at the age of 37.

== See also ==
- List of Victoria first-class cricketers
