= William Macrow =

Australian cricketer

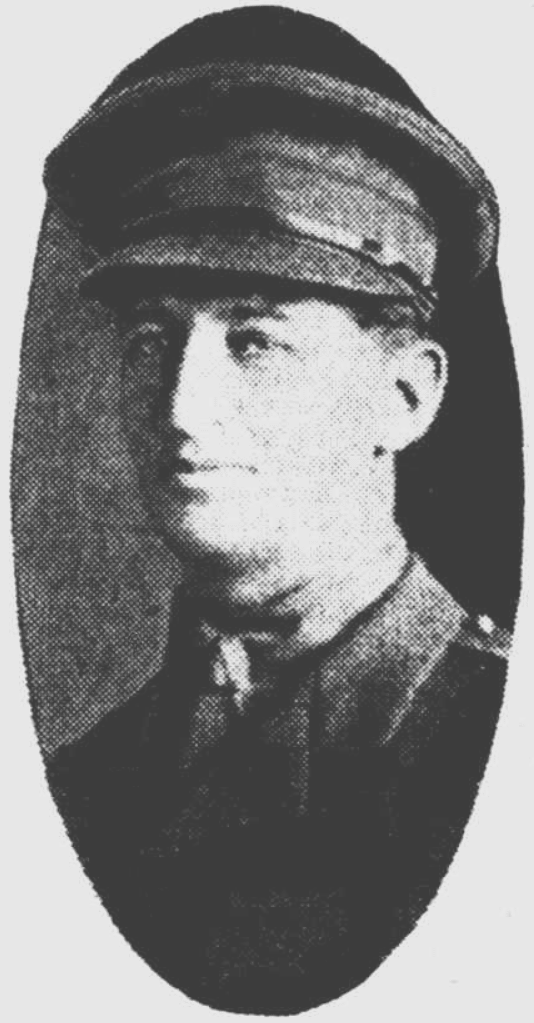

Personal information
- Born: 7 July 1889; Melbourne, Australia
- Died: 19 May 1970 (aged 80); Melbourne, Australia

Domestic team information
- Years: Team
- 1911-1913: Victoria
- Source: Cricinfo, 16 November 2015

William Macrow (7 July 1889 – 19 May 1970) was an Australian cricketer. He played five first-class cricket matches for Victoria between 1911 and 1913.

== See also ==
- List of Victoria first-class cricketers
