= Leigh Baker =

Australian cricketer (born 1951)

Personal information
- Born: 20 September 1951 (age 75); Melbourne, Australia

Domestic team information
- Years: Team
- 1975–1976: Victoria
- Source: Cricinfo, 5 December 2015

Leigh Baker (born 20 September 1951) is an Australian former cricketer. He played five first-class cricket matches for Victoria between 1975 and 1976.

== See also ==
- List of Victoria first-class cricketers
