= William Muir (cricketer) =

Australian cricketer

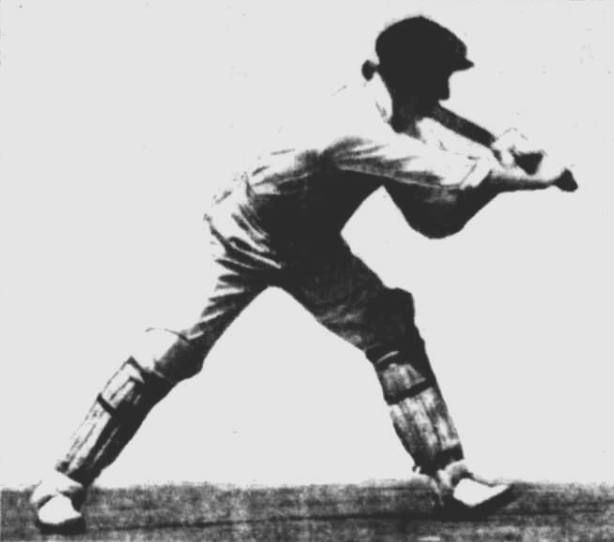

Personal information
- Born: 8 February 1907; Melbourne, Australia
- Died: 27 November 1964 (aged 57); Melbourne, Australia

Domestic team information
- Years: Team
- 1930: Victoria
- Source: Cricinfo, 21 November 2015

William Muir (8 February 1907 – 27 November 1964) was an Australian cricketer. He played one first-class cricket match for Victoria in 1930.

== See also ==
- List of Victoria first-class cricketers
