= Walter Stalker =

Australian cricketer

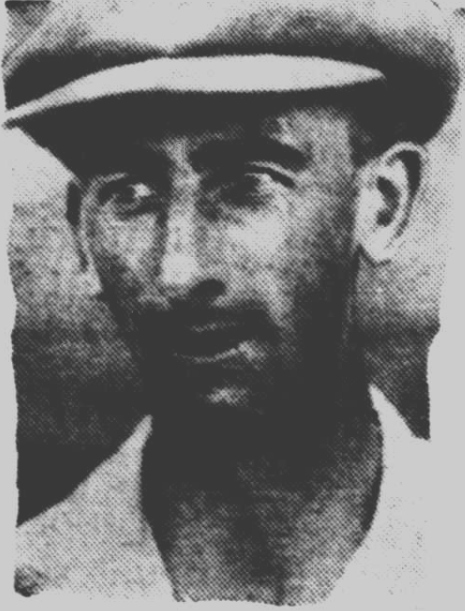

Personal information
- Born: 29 October 1909; Elaine, Victoria, Australia
- Died: 13 January 1977 (aged 67); Ballarat, Australia

Domestic team information
- Years: Team
- 1933: Victoria
- Source: Cricinfo, 22 November 2015

Walter Stalker (29 October 1909 – 13 January 1977) was an Australian cricketer. He played one first-class cricket match for Victoria in 1933.

== See also ==
- List of Victoria first-class cricketers
