= Lindsay Davison =

Australian cricketer (born 1941)

Personal information
- Born: 11 October 1941 (age 85); Melbourne, Australia

Domestic team information
- Years: Team
- 1962: Victoria
- Source: Cricinfo, 4 December 2015

Lindsay Davison (born 11 October 1941) is an Australian former cricketer. He played one first-class cricket match for Victoria in 1962.

== See also ==
- List of Victoria first-class cricketers
