= Peter Smith (Australian cricketer) =

Australian cricketer (born 1968)

Personal information
- Born: 8 February 1968 (age 58); Melbourne, Australia

Domestic team information
- Years: Team
- 1991: Victoria
- Source: Cricinfo, 9 December 2015

Peter Smith (born 8 February 1968) is an Australian former cricketer. He played one first-class cricket match for Victoria in 1991.

== See also ==
- List of Victoria first-class cricketers
