= Russell Sincock =

Australian cricketer (born 1947)

Personal information
- Born: 28 December 1947 (age 78); Melbourne, Australia

Domestic team information
- Years: Team
- 1969: Victoria
- Source: Cricinfo, 5 December 2015

Russell Sincock (born 28 December 1947) is an Australian former cricketer. He played two first-class cricket matches for Victoria in 1969.

== See also ==
- List of Victoria first-class cricketers
