= Stanley Stephens (cricketer) =

Australian cricketer

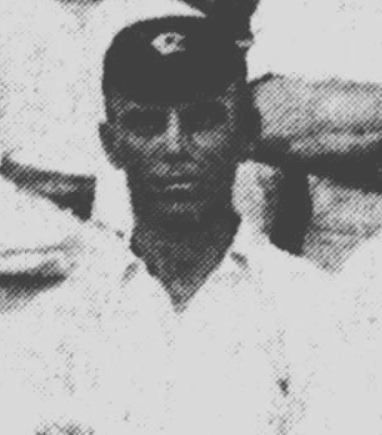

Personal information
- Born: 16 April 1883; Melbourne, Australia
- Died: 7 September 1965 (aged 82); Melbourne, Australia

Domestic team information
- Years: Team
- 1914-1915: Victoria
- Source: Cricinfo, 18 November 2015

Stanley Stephens (16 April 1883 – 7 September 1965) was an Australian cricketer. He played three first-class cricket matches for Victoria between 1914 and 1915.

== See also ==
- List of Victoria first-class cricketers
