= Peter Young (cricketer, born 1961) =

Australian cricketer (born 1961)

Personal information
- Born: 31 December 1961 (age 64); Geelong, Australia

Domestic team information
- Years: Team
- 1985-1990: Victoria
- Source: Cricinfo, 9 December 2015

Peter Young (born 31 December 1961) is an Australian former cricketer. He played 22 first-class cricket matches for Victoria between 1985 and 1990.

== See also ==
- List of Victoria first-class cricketers
