= William McEvoy =

Australian cricketer (1845–1930)

Personal information
- Full name: William Joseph McEvoy
- Born: 1845; Sydney, Colony of New South Wales
- Died: 14 July 1930 (aged 84–85); England

Domestic team information
- Years: Team
- 1877: Victoria
- Source: Cricinfo, 7 June 2015

William Joseph McEvoy (1845 – 14 July 1930) was an Australian cricketer. He played one first-class cricket match for Victoria in 1877.

== See also ==
- List of Victoria first-class cricketers
