= William Stokes (Victoria cricketer) =

Australian cricketer

Personal information
- Born: 11 December 1857; Melbourne, Colony of Victoria
- Died: 16 August 1929 (aged 71); Brighton, Victoria, Australia

Domestic team information
- Years: Team
- 1882: Victoria
- Source: Cricinfo, 23 July 2015

William Stokes (11 December 1857 – 16 August 1929) was an Australian cricketer. He played one first-class cricket match for Victoria in 1882.

== See also ==
- List of Victoria first-class cricketers
