= Geoff Miles (cricketer) =

Australian cricketer (born 1957)

Personal information
- Born: 7 August 1957 (age 69); Melbourne, Australia

Domestic team information
- Years: Team
- 1982-1984: Victoria
- Source: Cricinfo, 6 December 2015

Geoff Miles (born 7 August 1957) is an Australian former cricketer. He played nine first-class cricket matches for Victoria between 1982 and 1984.

== See also ==
- List of Victoria first-class cricketers
