= William Carr (cricketer) =

Australian cricketer (born 1976)

Personal information
- Born: 1 June 1976 (age 50); Melbourne, Victoria, Australia
- Height: 194 cm (6 ft 4 in)
- Batting: Right-handed
- Bowling: Right-arm fast
- Role: Bowler

Domestic team information
- Years: Team
- 2002–2003: Victoria
- Source: Cricinfo, 12 December 2015

William Carr (born 1 June 1976) is an Australian former cricketer. He played six first-class cricket matches for Victoria between 2002 and 2003.

== See also ==
- List of Victoria first-class cricketers
