= Hugh Baring =

Australian cricketer

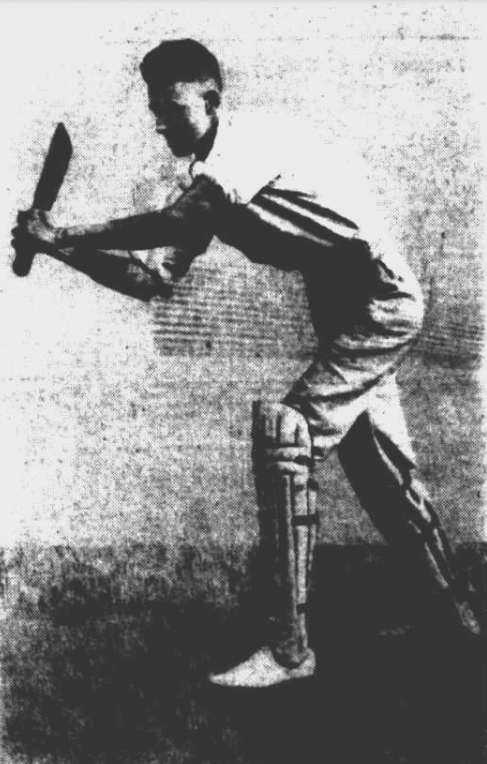

Personal information
- Born: 17 August 1906; Melbourne, Australia
- Died: 9 July 1968 (aged 61); Melbourne, Australia

Domestic team information
- Years: Team
- 1929-1930: Victoria
- Source: Cricinfo, 21 November 2015

Hugh Baring (17 August 1906 – 9 July 1968) was an Australian cricketer. He played two first-class cricket matches for Victoria between 1929 and 1930.

== See also ==
- List of Victoria first-class cricketers
