= William Stewart (Australian cricketer) =

Australian cricketer

Personal information
- Born: c. 1844

Domestic team information
- Years: Team
- 1862: Victoria
- Source: Cricinfo, 3 May 2015

William Stewart (born about 1844, date of death unknown) was an Australian cricketer. He played one first-class cricket match for Victoria in 1861.

== See also ==
- List of Victoria first-class cricketers
