= Robert McFarland (cricketer) =

Australian cricketer

Personal information
- Born: 9 July 1847; Coleraine
- Died: 4 July 1876 (aged 28); Carlton, Victoria, Australia

Domestic team information
- Years: Team
- 1871: Victoria
- Source: Cricinfo, 3 May 2015

Robert McFarland (9 July 1847 – 4 July 1876) was an Australian cricketer. He played one first-class cricket match for Victoria in 1871.

== See also ==
- List of Victoria first-class cricketers
