= Robert Hosie (cricketer) =

Australian cricketer (1858–1932)

Personal information
- Born: 8 September 1858; Melbourne, Australia
- Died: 29 September 1932 (aged 74); Brighton, Victoria, Australia

Domestic team information
- Years: Team
- 1884: Victoria
- Source: Cricinfo, 24 July 2015

Robert Hosie (8 September 1858 – 29 September 1932) was an Australian cricketer. He played one first-class cricket match for Victoria in 1884.

== See also ==
- List of Victoria first-class cricketers
