= Henry Hetherington (cricketer) =

Australian cricketer

Personal information
- Born: 3 September 1874; Melbourne, Australia
- Died: 11 July 1950 (aged 75); Melbourne, Australia

Domestic team information
- Years: Team
- 1899: Victoria
- Source: Cricinfo, 27 July 2015

Henry Hetherington (3 September 1874 –11 July 1950) was an Australian cricketer. He played one first-class cricket match for Victoria in 1899.

== See also ==
- List of Victoria first-class cricketers
