= John Wildsmith (cricketer) =

Australian cricketer (born 1939)

Personal information
- Born: 1 July 1939 (age 87); Melbourne, Australia

Domestic team information
- Years: Team
- 1959-1963: Victoria
- Source: Cricinfo, 4 December 2015

John Wildsmith (born 1 July 1939) is an Australian former cricketer. He played ten first-class cricket matches for Victoria between 1959 and 1963.

== See also ==
- List of Victoria first-class cricketers
