= Robert Nettleton =

Australian cricketer

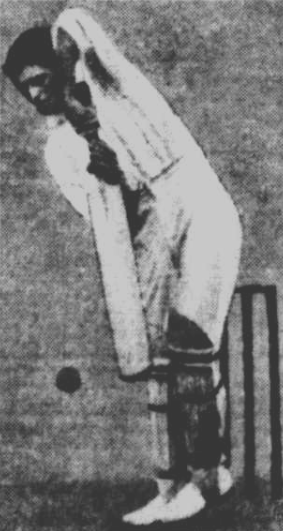

Personal information
- Born: 16 September 1909; Melbourne, Australia
- Died: 6 April 1972 (aged 62); Melbourne, Australia

Domestic team information
- Years: Team
- 1930-1931: Victoria
- Source: Cricinfo, 21 November 2015

Robert Nettleton (16 September 1909 – 6 April 1972) was an Australian cricketer. He played two first-class cricket matches for Victoria between 1930 and 1931.

== See also ==
- List of Victoria first-class cricketers
