= Alfred Noyes (cricketer) =

Australian cricketer

Personal information
- Born: 1835; Torquay, England
- Died: 30 September 1902 (aged 66–67); Deniliquin, Australia

Domestic team information
- Years: Team
- 1869: Victoria
- Source: Cricinfo, 3 May 2015

Dr Alfred William Finch Noyes (1835 – 30 September 1902) was an Australian cricketer. He played one first-class cricket match for Victoria in 1869. He was also a hospital surgeon.

== See also ==
- List of Victoria first-class cricketers
