= Rowland Bailey =

Australian cricketer

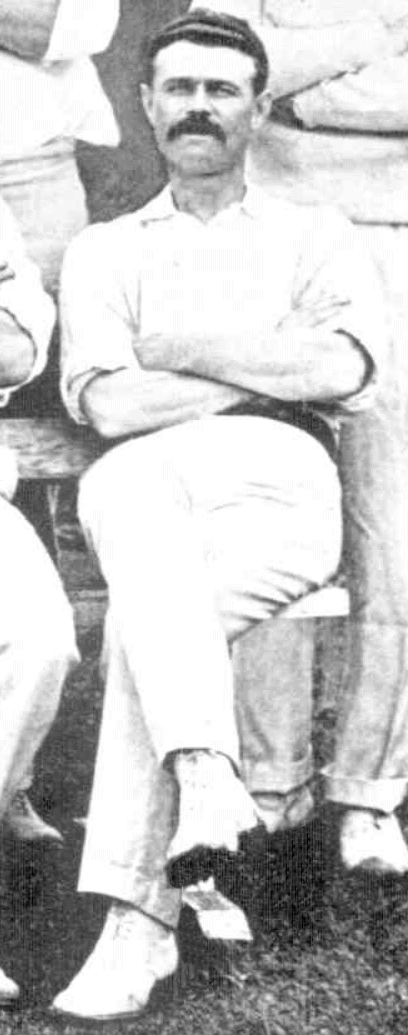

Personal information
- Born: 5 October 1876; Melbourne, Australia
- Died: 24 March 1950 (aged 73); Ivanhoe, Victoria, Australia

Domestic team information
- Years: Team
- 1913: Victoria
- Source: Cricinfo, 18 November 2015

Rowland Bailey (5 October 1876 – 24 March 1950) was an Australian cricketer. He played one first-class cricket match for Victoria in 1913.

== See also ==
- List of Victoria first-class cricketers
