= Gary Living =

Australian cricketer (born 1952)

Personal information
- Born: 1 October 1952 (age 74); Melbourne, Australia

Domestic team information
- Years: Team
- 1972-1973: Victoria
- Source: Cricinfo, 5 December 2015

Gary Living (born 1 October 1952) is an Australian former cricketer. He played four first-class cricket matches for Victoria between 1972 and 1973.

== See also ==
- List of Victoria first-class cricketers
