= Richard Kelly (Australian cricketer) =

Australian cricketer

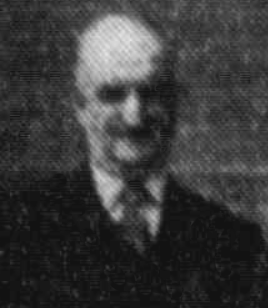

Personal information
- Born: 21 March 1870; Melbourne, Australia
- Died: 27 December 1941 (aged 71); Melbourne, Australia

Domestic team information
- Years: Team
- 1897: Victoria
- Source: Cricinfo, 26 July 2015

Richard Kelly (21 March 1870 – 27 December 1941) was an Australian cricketer. He played one first-class cricket match for Victoria in 1897.

== See also ==
- List of Victoria first-class cricketers
