= Thomas Grant (cricketer) =

Australian cricketer (1879–1934)

Personal information
- Born: 20 December 1879; Melbourne, Australia
- Died: 1934 (aged 54–55); Kurri Kurri, Australia

Domestic team information
- Years: Team
- 1907: Victoria
- Source: Cricinfo, 15 November 2015

Thomas Grant (20 December 1879 – 1934) was an Australian cricketer. He played one first-class cricket match for Victoria in 1907.

== See also ==
- List of Victoria first-class cricketers
