= William Reeves (Australian cricketer) =

Australian cricketer

Personal information
- Born: 1881; Melbourne, Australia
- Died: 13 September 1962 (aged 80–81); Melbourne, Australia

Domestic team information
- Years: Team
- 1907-1910: Victoria
- Source: Cricinfo, 15 November 2015

William Reeves (1881 – 13 September 1962) was an Australian cricketer. He played three first-class cricket matches for Victoria between 1907 and 1910.

== See also ==
- List of Victoria first-class cricketers
