= Robert Osborne (Victoria cricketer) =

Australian cricketer

Personal information
- Born: 29 September 1881; Melbourne, Australia
- Died: 19 November 1927 (aged 46); Wesburn, Australia

Domestic team information
- Years: Team
- 1904-1905: Victoria
- Source: Cricinfo, 15 November 2015

Robert Osborne (29 September 1881 – 19 November 1927) was an Australian cricketer. He played four first-class cricket matches for Victoria between 1904 and 1905.

== See also ==
- List of Victoria first-class cricketers
