= Michael Murphy (cricketer) =

Australian cricketer

Personal information
- Born: 12 June 1854; Sydney, Australia
- Died: 2 September 1890 (aged 36); Richmond, Melbourne, Australia

Domestic team information
- Years: Team
- 1874: Victoria
- Source: Cricinfo, 7 June 2015

Michael Murphy (12 June 1854 – 2 September 1890) was an Australian cricketer. He played one first-class cricket match for Victoria in 1874.

== See also ==
- List of Victoria first-class cricketers
