= Frederick Yeomans =

Australian cricketer

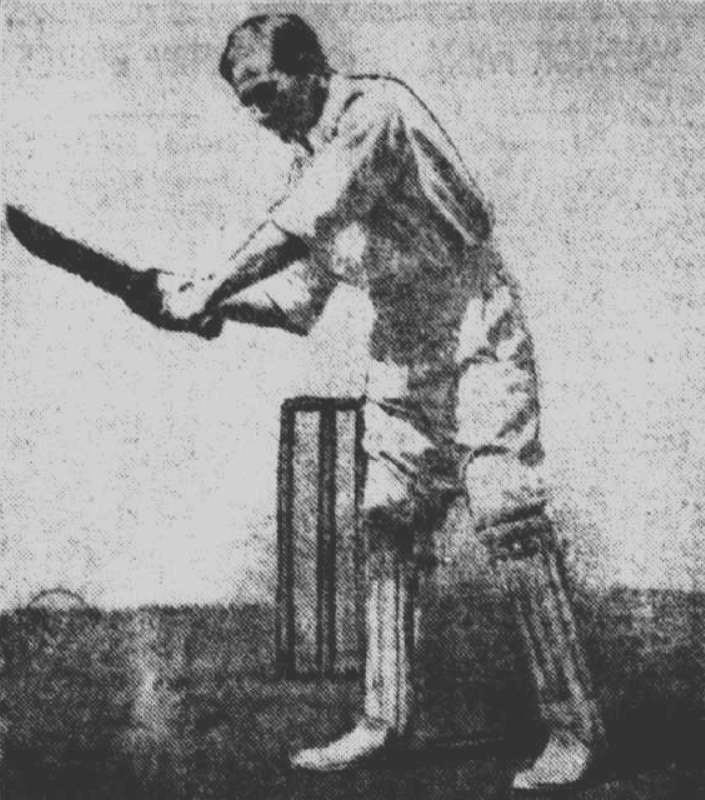

Personal information
- Born: 11 November 1888; Melbourne, Australia
- Died: 16 January 1965 (aged 76); Melbourne, Australia

Domestic team information
- Years: Team
- 1915: Victoria
- Source: Cricinfo, 18 November 2015

Frederick Yeomans (11 November 1888 – 16 January 1965) was an Australian cricketer. He played one first-class cricket match for Victoria in 1915. In his district career Yeoman represented Northcotes becoming popular and consistently scoring runs into the early 1920s.

== See also ==
- List of Victoria first-class cricketers
