= Daniel Noonan (cricketer) =

Australian cricketer

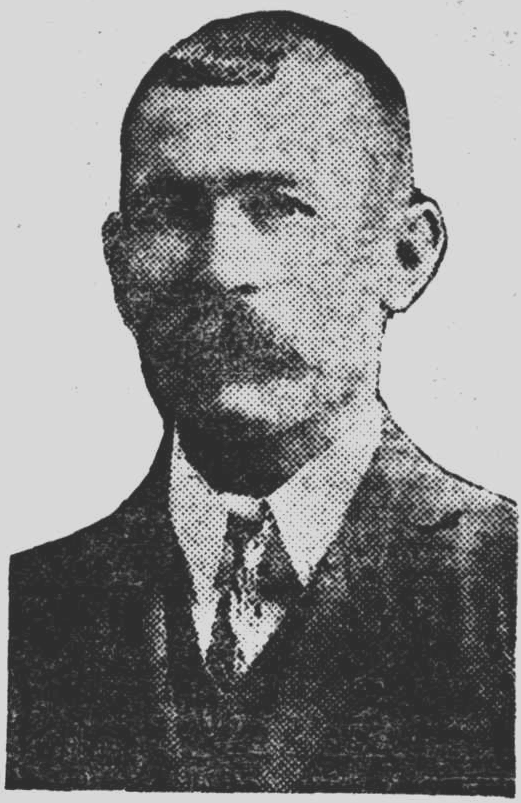

Personal information
- Born: 11 May 1873; Melbourne, Australia
- Died: 30 May 1910 (aged 37); Melbourne, Australia

Domestic team information
- Years: Team
- 1901-1903: Victoria
- Source: Cricinfo, 16 August 2015

Daniel Noonan (11 May 1873 – 30 May 1910) was an Australian cricketer. He played five first-class cricket matches for Victoria between 1901 and 1903. He also played for North Melbourne Cricket Club.

== See also ==
- List of Victoria first-class cricketers
