= William Dick (cricketer) =

Australian cricketer

Personal information
- Full name: William Allan Dick
- Born: 11 October 1922; Newcastle, New South Wales, Australia
- Died: 27 March 2004 (aged 81); Melbourne, Australia
- Batting: Right-handed
- Bowling: Leg break

Domestic team information
- Years: Team
- 1947-1957: Victoria
- Source: Cricinfo, 29 November 2015

William Dick (11 October 1922 – 27 March 2004) was an Australian cricketer. He played 18 first-class cricket matches for Victoria between 1947 and 1957. He was later awarded the Order of Australia for his works in cancer research.

== See also ==
- List of Victoria first-class cricketers
