= William Perraton =

Australian cricketer

Personal information
- Born: 27 August 1867; Melbourne, Australia
- Died: 23 September 1952 (aged 85); Melbourne, Australia

Domestic team information
- Years: Team
- 1900: Victoria
- Source: Cricinfo, 31 July 2015

William Perraton (27 August 1867 – 23 September 1952) was an Australian cricketer. He played one first-class cricket match for Victoria in 1900.

== See also ==
- List of Victoria first-class cricketers
