= David Emerson (cricketer) =

Australian cricketer (born 1961)

Personal information
- Born: 10 March 1961 (age 65); Melbourne, Australia

Domestic team information
- Years: Team
- 1983-1995: Victoria
- Source: Cricinfo, 6 December 2015

David Emerson (born 10 March 1961) is an Australian former cricketer. He played 16 first-class cricket matches for Victoria between 1983 and 1995.

Emerson attended Scotch College and played district cricket for Collingwood.

Outside cricket, Emerson worked as a teacher.

== See also ==
- List of Victoria first-class cricketers
