= Patrick Deely =

Australian cricketer

Personal information
- Born: 18 February 1864; Melbourne, Australia
- Died: 28 February 1925 (aged 61); Brighton, Victoria, Australia

Domestic team information
- Years: Team
- 1884: Victoria
- Source: Cricinfo, 24 July 2015

Patrick Deely (18 February 1864 – 28 February 1925) was an Australian cricketer. He played one first-class cricket match for Victoria in 1884.

== See also ==
- List of Victoria first-class cricketers
