= Peter Sacristani =

Australian cricketer (born 1957)

Personal information
- Born: 15 September 1957 (age 69); Melbourne, Australia

Domestic team information
- Years: Team
- 1982-1983: Victoria

Peter Sacristani (born 15 September 1957) is an Australian former cricketer. He played seven first-class cricket matches for Victoria between 1982 and 1983.

== See also ==
- List of Victoria first-class cricketers
