= Edward Boulter =

Australian cricketer

Personal information
- Born: 23 March 1886; Melbourne, Australia
- Died: 10 June 1968 (aged 82); Melbourne, Australia

Domestic team information
- Years: Team
- 1912: Victoria
- Source: Cricinfo, 16 November 2015

Edward Boulter (23 March 1886 – 10 June 1968) was an Australian cricketer. He played one first-class cricket match for Victoria in 1912.

== See also ==
- List of Victoria first-class cricketers
