= Charles Peryman =

Australian cricketer

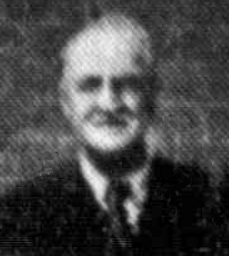

Personal information
- Born: 20 January 1872; Melbourne, Australia
- Died: 30 August 1950 (aged 78); Melbourne, Australia

Domestic team information
- Years: Team
- 1895-1896: Victoria
- Source: Cricinfo, 26 July 2015

Charles Peryman (20 January 1872 – 30 August 1950) was an Australian cricketer who played three first-class cricket matches for the Victoria cricket team between 1895 and 1896. He played for the Melbourne Cricket Club in the 1890s for the First XI and remained after his playing days. He coached the St. Kilda Cricket Club from the 1920s into the mid-1930s. For money, he worked for estate agency W. H. Peryman and Co. In 1934 he was elected churchwarden of Christ Church in St. Kilda.

== See also ==
- List of Victoria first-class cricketers
