= Peter Harper (cricketer) =

Australian cricketer (born 1977)

Personal information
- Born: 11 December 1977 (age 48); Melbourne, Australia

Domestic team information
- Years: Team
- 1998-2001: Victoria
- Source: Cricinfo, 12 December 2015

Peter Harper (born 11 December 1977) is an Australian former cricketer. He played two first-class cricket matches for Victoria between 1998 and 2001.

== See also ==
- List of Victoria first-class cricketers
