= John Watmuff =

Australian cricketer

Personal information
- Born: 16 September 1915; Melbourne, Australia
- Died: 10 August 1972 (aged 56); Melbourne, Australia

Domestic team information
- Years: Team
- 1935-1936: Victoria
- Source: Cricinfo, 22 November 2015

John Watmuff (16 September 1915 – 10 August 1972) was an Australian cricketer. He played two first-class cricket matches for Victoria between 1935 and 1936.

== See also ==
- List of Victoria first-class cricketers
