= Robert Wilkinson (Australian cricketer) =

Australian cricketer

Personal information
- Full name: Robert B Wilkinson

Domestic team information
- Years: Team
- 1854: Victoria
- Source: Cricinfo, 30 January 2015

Robert Wilkinson was an Australian cricketer. He played one first-class cricket match for Victoria in 1854.

== See also ==
- List of Victoria first-class cricketers
