= Louis Goldsmith =

Australian cricketer

Personal information
- Born: 14 September 1846; Melbourne, Colony of New South Wales
- Died: 15 September 1911 (aged 65); Melbourne, Australia

Domestic team information
- Years: Team
- 1869-1875: Victoria
- Source: Cricinfo, 3 May 2015

Louis Goldsmith (14 September 1846 – 15 September 1911) was an Australian cricketer. He played seven first-class cricket matches for Victoria between 1869 and 1875.

== See also ==
- List of Victoria first-class cricketers
