= Walter Ingleton =

Australian cricketer

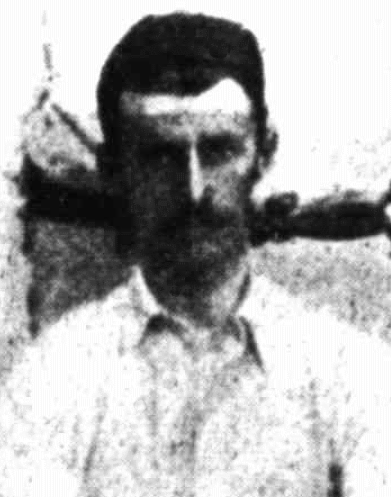

Personal information
- Born: 16 February 1867; Melbourne, Australia
- Died: 4 January 1923 (aged 55); Melbourne, Australia

Domestic team information
- Years: Team
- 1890-1897: Victoria
- Source: Cricinfo, 25 July 2015

Walter Ingleton (16 February 1867 – 4 January 1923) was an Australian cricketer. He played five first-class cricket matches for Victoria between 1890 and 1897.

== See also ==
- List of Victoria first-class cricketers
