= Ian Hewett =

Australian cricketer (born 1976)

Personal information
- Born: 24 January 1976 (age 50); Melbourne, Australia

Domestic team information
- Years: Team
- 1996-2002: Victoria
- Source: Cricinfo, 12 December 2015

Ian Hewett (born 24 January 1976) is an Australian former cricketer. He played three first-class cricket matches for Victoria between 1996 and 2002.

== See also ==
- List of Victoria first-class cricketers
