= Rohan Larkin =

Australian cricketer (born 1969)

Personal information
- Born: 19 October 1969 (age 57); Melbourne, Australia

Domestic team information
- Years: Team
- 1995-1997: Victoria
- Source: Cricinfo, 10 December 2015

Rohan Larkin (born 19 October 1969) is an Australian former cricketer. He played 16 first-class cricket matches for Victoria between 1995 and 1997.

== See also ==
- List of Victoria first-class cricketers
