= Thomas Hepburn (cricketer) =

Australian cricketer

Personal information
- Born: 20 December 1839; Collingwood, Melbourne, Australia
- Died: 22 April 1921 (aged 81); Ripponlea, Australia

Domestic team information
- Years: Team
- 1872-1873: Victoria
- Source: Cricinfo, 6 June 2015

Thomas Hepburn (20 December 1839 – 22 April 1921) was an Australian cricketer. He played two first-class cricket matches for Victoria between 1872 and 1873.

== See also ==
- List of Victoria first-class cricketers
