= Neville West =

Australian cricketer

Personal information
- Born: 9 November 1933; Melbourne, Australia
- Died: August 1987; Sydney, Australia

Domestic team information
- Years: Team
- 1962-1963: Victoria
- Source: Cricinfo, 4 December 2015

Neville West (9 November 1933 – August 1987) was an Australian cricketer. He played nine first-class cricket matches for Victoria between 1962 and 1963.

== See also ==
- List of Victoria first-class cricketers
