= William Ross (cricketer) =

Australian cricketer

Personal information
- Full name: William A. Ross

Domestic team information
- Years: Team
- 1860: Victoria
- Source: Cricinfo, 3 May 2015

William Ross was an Australian cricketer. He played one first-class cricket match for Victoria in 1860.

== See also ==
- List of Victoria first-class cricketers
