= Graeme Vimpani =

Australian cricketer (born 1972)

Graeme Ronald Vimpani (born 27 January 1972 in Brisbane, Queensland) was an Australian first-class cricketer who played for the Victorian Bushrangers as a right-handed top order batsman.

Vimpani made his debut in 1995–96, opening the batting alongside Matthew Elliott. In his 30 first class appearances he made 3 hundreds with a highest score of 161 against NSW at the MCG. Other notable performances include his maiden first class century of 133 against the West Indies in 1996/97.

Vimpani also played 19 one day matches for Victoria with a top score of 93 against NSW.

Following his playing career, he worked at Cricket Australia in Public Affairs for several years, before joining the private sector.

== See also ==
- List of Victoria first-class cricketers
