= Stanley Quin =

Australian cricketer (1908–1967)

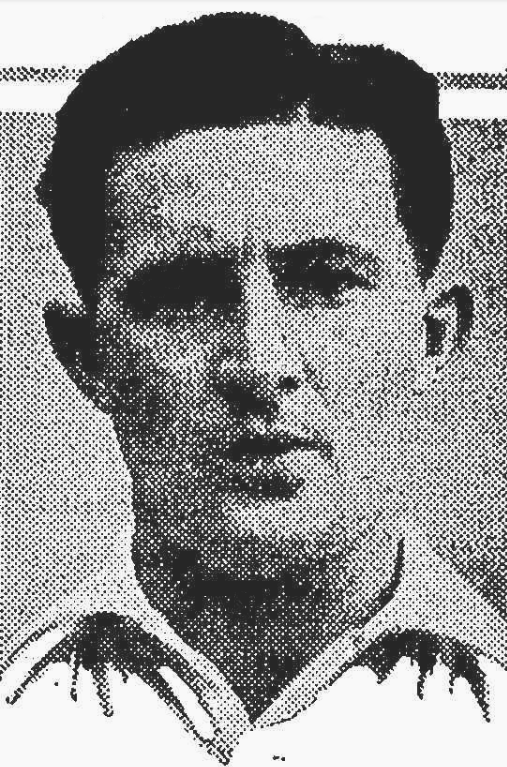

Personal information
- Born: 17 April 1908; Caulfield, Victoria, Australia
- Died: 27 November 1967 (aged 59); Brighton, Victoria, Australia

Domestic team information
- Years: Team
- 1931-1938: Victoria
- Source: Cricinfo, 22 November 2015

Stanley Quin (17 April 1908 – 27 November 1967) was an Australian cricketer. He played 24 first-class cricket matches for Victoria between 1931 and 1938.

== See also ==
- List of Victoria first-class cricketers
