= James Makin =

Australian cricketer

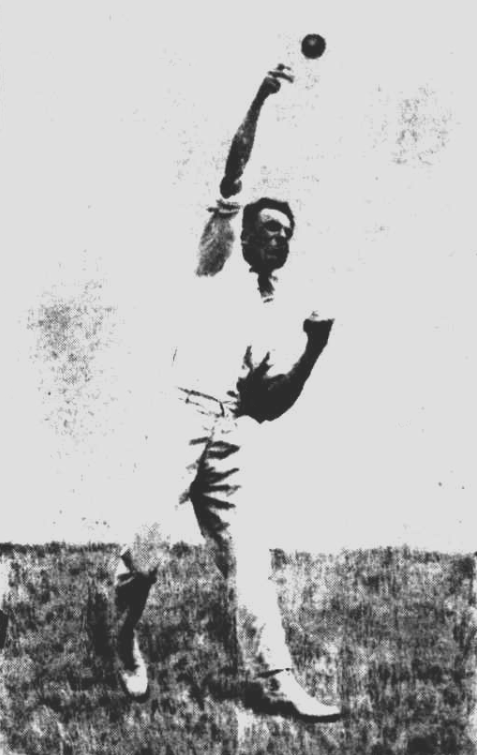

Personal information
- Born: 11 February 1904; Melbourne, Australia
- Died: 15 January 1973 (aged 68); Melbourne, Australia

Domestic team information
- Years: Team
- 1927-1930: Victoria
- Source: Cricinfo, 21 November 2015

James Makin (11 February 1904 – 15 January 1973) was an Australian cricketer. He played five first-class cricket matches for Victoria between 1927 and 1930.

== See also ==
- List of Victoria first-class cricketers
