= William Welch (cricketer, born 1907) =

Australian cricketer (1907–1983)

Personal information
- Born: 9 June 1907
- Died: 11 April 1983 (aged 75); Melbourne, Australia

Domestic team information
- Years: Team
- 1935-1936: Victoria
- Source: Cricinfo, 22 November 2015

William Welch (9 June 1907 – 11 April 1983) was an Australian cricketer. He played four first-class cricket matches for Victoria between 1935 and 1936.

== See also ==
- List of Victoria first-class cricketers
