= James Trinnick =

Australian cricketer

Personal information
- Born: 13 December 1853; Kingsbridge, Devon, England
- Died: 12 July 1928 (aged 74); Northcote, Victoria, Australia

Domestic team information
- Years: Team
- 1880-1887: Victoria
- Source: Cricinfo, 22 July 2015

James Trinnick (13 December 1853 – 12 July 1928) was an Australian cricketer. He played six first-class cricket matches for Victoria between 1880 and 1887.

== See also ==
- List of Victoria first-class cricketers
