= Norman Speirs =

Australian cricketer

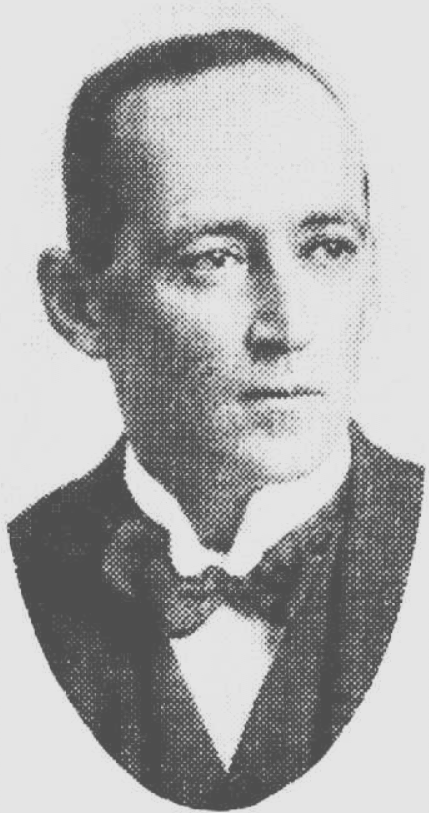

Personal information
- Born: 31 May 1886; Melbourne, Australia
- Died: 1 August 1960 (aged 74); Noosa Heads, Australia

Domestic team information
- Years: Team
- 1908: Victoria
- Source: Cricinfo, 15 November 2015

Norman Speirs (31 May 1886 – 1 August 1960) was an Australian cricketer. He played two first-class cricket matches for Victoria in 1908.

== See also ==
- List of Victoria first-class cricketers
