= William Wilkinson (Australian cricketer) =

Australian cricketer

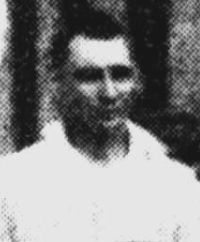

Personal information
- Born: 1 September 1899; Melbourne, Australia
- Died: 5 May 1974 (aged 74); Melbourne, Australia

Domestic team information
- Years: Team
- 1924-1931: Victoria
- Source: Cricinfo, 20 November 2015

William Wilkinson (1 September 1899 – 5 May 1974) was an Australian cricketer. He played ten first-class cricket matches for Victoria between 1924 and 1931.

== See also ==
- List of Victoria first-class cricketers
