= Geoffrey Longney =

Australian cricketer (1935–2018)

Personal information
- Born: 25 May 1935; Melbourne, Australia
- Died: 26 September 2018 (aged 83); Melbourne, Australia

Domestic team information
- Years: Team
- 1956: Victoria
- Source: Cricinfo, 10 October 2018

Geoffrey Longney (25 May 1935 – 26 September 2018) was an Australian cricketer. He played one first-class cricket match for Victoria in 1956.

== See also ==
- List of Victoria first-class cricketers
