= Vincent Trapp =

Australian cricketer

Personal information
- Born: 26 January 1861; Melbourne, Australia
- Died: 21 October 1929 (aged 68); Melbourne, Australia

Domestic team information
- Years: Team
- 1881-1884: Victoria
- Source: Cricinfo, 23 July 2015

Vincent Trapp (26 January 1861 – 21 October 1929) was an Australian cricketer. He played three first-class cricket matches for Victoria between 1881 and 1884.

== See also ==
- List of Victoria first-class cricketers
