= Charles Letcher =

Australian cricketer

Personal information
- Born: 22 December 1868; Melbourne, Australia
- Died: 30 November 1916 (aged 47); Perth, Australia

Domestic team information
- Years: Team
- 1888-1894: Victoria
- Source: Cricinfo, 25 July 2015

Charles Letcher (22 December 1868 – 30 November 1916) was an Australian cricketer. He played four first-class cricket matches for Victoria between 1888 and 1894.

== See also ==
- List of Victoria first-class cricketers
