= Robert Power (cricketer) =

Australian cricketer

Personal information
- Born: 1833; Galway, Ireland
- Died: 4 November 1914 (aged 80–81); Melbourne, Australia

Domestic team information
- Years: Team
- 1858: Victoria
- Source: Cricinfo, 2 May 2015

Robert Power (1833 – 4 November 1914) was an Australian cricketer. He played two first-class cricket matches for Victoria in 1858.

== See also ==
- List of Victoria first-class cricketers
