= Gerard Clarke =

Australian cricketer (born 1966)

Personal information
- Born: 31 December 1966 (age 59); Melbourne, Australia

Domestic team information
- Years: Team
- 1994-1995: Victoria
- Source: Cricinfo, 10 December 2015

Gerard Clarke (born 31 December 1966) is an Australian former cricketer. He played three first-class cricket matches for Victoria between 1994 and 1995.

== See also ==
- List of Victoria first-class cricketers
