= Dudley Fitzmaurice =

Australian cricketer

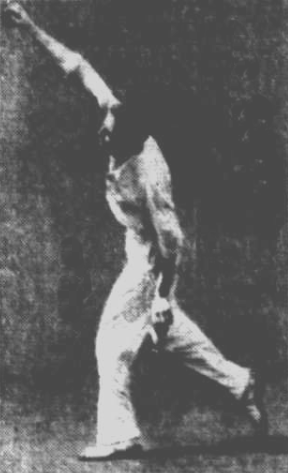

Personal information
- Born: 21 May 1913; Melbourne, Australia
- Died: 18 June 2001 (aged 88); Melbourne, Australia

Domestic team information
- Years: Team
- 1933-1939: Victoria
- Source: Cricinfo, 22 November 2015

Dudley Fitzmaurice (21 May 1913 – 18 June 2001) was an Australian cricketer. He played four first-class cricket matches for Victoria between 1933 and 1939.

== See also ==
- List of Victoria first-class cricketers
