= Robert Dempster =

Australian cricketer

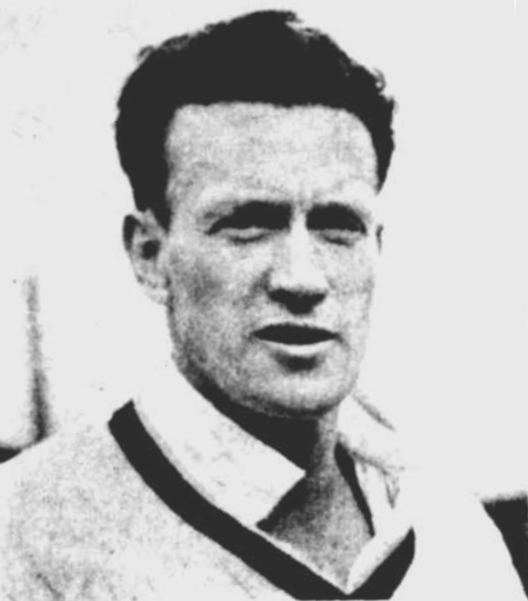

Personal information
- Born: 11 March 1915; Melbourne, Australia
- Died: 2 April 1974 (aged 59); Melbourne, Australia

Domestic team information
- Years: Team
- 1935-1941: Victoria
- Source: Cricinfo, 22 November 2015

Robert Dempster (11 March 1915 – 2 April 1974) was an Australian cricketer. He played eight first-class cricket matches for Victoria between 1935 and 1941. He had a highly successful district career as an all-rounder for the North Melbourne cricket club, captaining them into the late 1940s. In his personal life he had two daughters and worked as estimating officer for Henderson's Spring Works from when he left school throughout his cricket career.

== Career ==
Dempster played for the St. Alban's Church cricket team as a teenager before debuting for North Melbourne in 1932. He played for the thirds as a bowler topping the bowling average in his first season in the Metropolitan league, and in the next season he played for the seconds scoring 707 runs helping the side win the seconds premiership.

In the 1934/35 season he debuted in the North Melbourne First XI as an allrounder opening both the batting and the bowling and he continued to do so throughout his career for the club. He scored an aggregate of 854 runs in his first district season which was a record for the time. He debuted for Victoria in 1935 and played for the state side until 1941, and he eventually became Captain of North Melbourne and captained until at least 1949.

== See also ==
- List of Victoria first-class cricketers
