= William Logan (cricketer) =

Australian cricketer

Personal information
- Full name: William Logan

Domestic team information
- Years: Team
- 1882-1888: Victoria
- Source: Cricinfo, 23 July 2015

William Logan was an Australian cricketer. He played two first-class cricket matches for Victoria between 1882 and 1888.

== See also ==
- List of Victoria first-class cricketers
