= Henry Box (cricketer) =

Australian cricketer

Personal information
- Born: September 1837; London, England
- Died: 3 June 1916 (aged 78)

Domestic team information
- Years: Team
- 1858: Victoria
- Source: Cricinfo, 2 May 2015

Henry Box (September 1837 – 3 June 1916) was an Australian cricketer. He played two first-class cricket matches for Victoria in 1858.

== See also ==
- List of Victoria first-class cricketers
