= Timothy Scannell =

Australian cricketer

Personal information
- Born: 12 November 1882; Melbourne, Australia
- Died: 9 July 1939 (aged 56); Melbourne, Australia

Domestic team information
- Years: Team
- 1910: Victoria
- Source: Cricinfo, 16 November 2015

Timothy Scannell (12 November 1882 – 9 July 1939) was an Australian cricketer. He played two first-class cricket matches for Victoria in 1910.

== See also ==
- List of Victoria first-class cricketers
