= Ron Nicholls (cricketer, born 1951) =

Australian cricketer (born 1951)

Personal information
- Born: 1 September 1951 (age 75); Melbourne, Australia

Domestic team information
- Years: Team
- 1974-1975: Victoria
- Source: Cricinfo, 5 December 2015

Ron Nicholls (born 1 September 1951) is an Australian former cricketer. He played two first-class cricket matches for Victoria between 1974 and 1975.

== See also ==
- List of Victoria first-class cricketers
