= Peter Bailey (cricketer) =

Australian cricketer (born 1939)

Personal information
- Born: 16 August 1939 (age 87); Melbourne, Australia

Domestic team information
- Years: Team
- 1960: Victoria
- Source: Cricinfo, 4 December 2015

Peter Bailey (born 16 August 1939) is an Australian former cricketer. He played ones first-class cricket match for Victoria in 1960.

== See also ==
- List of Victoria first-class cricketers
