= Stanley Smith (cricketer) =

Australian cricketer

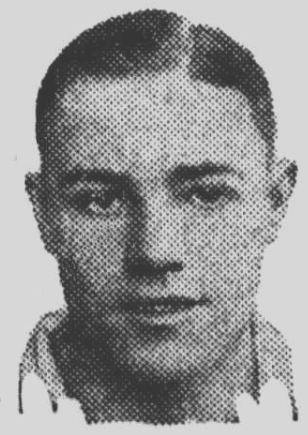

Personal information
- Born: 8 January 1910; Melbourne, Australia
- Died: 1984 (aged 73–74); Melbourne, Australia

Domestic team information
- Years: Team
- 1931-1936: Victoria
- Source: Cricinfo, 22 November 2015

Stanley Arthur John Smith (8 January 1910 – 1984) was an Australian cricketer. He played 14 first-class cricket matches for Victoria between 1931 and 1936.

== See also ==
- List of Victoria first-class cricketers
