= Steve McCooke =

Australian cricketer (born 1960)

Steven McCooke
Personal information
- Full name: Steven Milne McCooke
- Born: 31 January 1960 (age 66); Melbourne, Australia

Domestic team information
- Years: Team
- 1994: Victoria
- Source: Cricinfo, 10 December 2015

Steve McCooke (born 31 January 1960) is an Australian former cricketer. He played three first-class cricket matches for Victoria in 1994.

== See also ==
- List of Victoria first-class cricketers
