= Edward Fanning =

Australian cricketer

Personal information
- Born: 16 March 1848; Sydney, Australia
- Died: 30 November 1917 (aged 69); St Kilda, Australia

Domestic team information
- Years: Team
- 1873: Victoria
- Source: Cricinfo, 6 June 2015

Edward Fanning (16 March 1848 – 30 November 1917) was an Australian cricketer. He played one first-class cricket match for Victoria in 1873.

== See also ==
- List of Victoria first-class cricketers
