= Noel Shaw =

Australian cricketer

Personal information
- Born: 10 May 1937; Melbourne, Australia
- Died: 10 December 2017 (aged 80); Melbourne, Australia

Domestic team information
- Years: Team
- 1958: Victoria
- Source: Cricinfo, 3 December 2015

Noel Shaw (10 May 1937 – 10 December 2017) was an Australian cricketer. He had played one first-class cricket match for Victoria in 1958.

== See also ==
- List of Victoria first-class cricketers
