= Lee Braid =

Australian cricketer

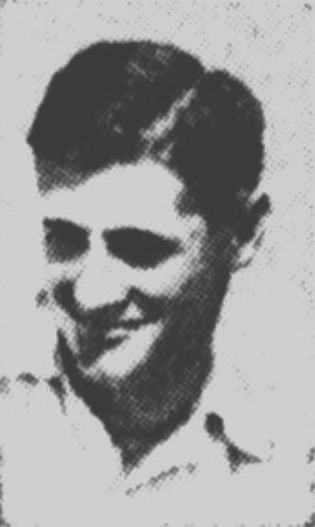

Personal information
- Born: 3 March 1888; Melbourne, Australia
- Died: 11 November 1963 (aged 75); Melbourne, Australia

Domestic team information
- Years: Team
- 1912-1922: Victoria
- Source: Cricinfo, 16 November 2015

Lee Braid (3 March 1888 – 11 November 1963) was an Australian cricketer. He played five first-class cricket matches for Victoria between 1912 and 1922.

== See also ==
- List of Victoria first-class cricketers
