= Alfred Black =

Australian cricketer

Personal information
- Died: 1859

Domestic team information
- Years: Team
- 1858: Victoria
- Source: Cricinfo, 2 May 2015

Alfred Angel Black (died 1859) was an Australian cricketer. He played two first-class cricket matches for Victoria in 1858. He was "Minister of War" of the insurgents in the Eureka Stockade.

== See also ==
- List of Victoria first-class cricketers
