= Phil Hyde (cricketer) =

Australian cricketer (born 1958)

Personal information
- Full name: Phillip Andrew Hyde
- Born: 22 October 1958 (age 68); Melbourne, Victoria, Australia
- Batting: Right-handed
- Role: Wicket-keeper

Domestic team information
- Years: Team
- 1983/84–1984/85: Victoria

Career statistics
Competition	First-class	List A
Matches	10	2
Runs scored	258	20
Batting average	19.84	20.00
100s/50s	0/0	0/0
Top score	43*	20
Catches/stumpings	23/2	3/0
- Source: Cricinfo, 6 December 2015

Phillip Andrew Hyde (born 22 October 1958) is an Australian former cricketer. He played ten first-class matches and two List A cricket matches for Victoria between the 1983–84 and 1984–85.
