= H. E. Stratford =

Australian cricketer

Personal information
- Full name: H. E. Stratford

Domestic team information
- Years: Team
- 1853/54: Victoria
- Only First-class: 3 March 1854 v Tasmania

Career statistics
Competition	First-class
Matches	1
Runs scored	2
Batting average	2.00
100s/50s	0/0
Top score	2*
Balls bowled	0
Wickets	–
Bowling average	–
5 wickets in innings	–
10 wickets in match	–
Best bowling	–
Catches/stumpings	0/0
- Source: CricketArchive, 17 November 2011

H. E. Stratford was an Australian cricketer who played for Victoria.

Stratford made a single first-class appearance for the team, during the 1853–54 season, against Tasmania. From the tail end, he scored 2 not out in the first innings in which he batted, and a duck in the second.
