= Henry Maplestone =

Australian cricketer (1870–1949)

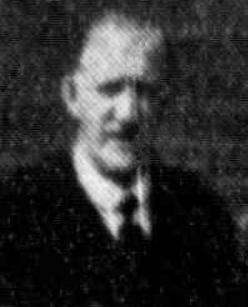
- Maplestone in 1934

Personal information
- Born: 11 January 1870; Parkville, Victoria, Australia
- Died: 10 December 1949 (aged 79); Moonee Ponds, Victoria, Australia

Domestic team information
- Years: Team
- 1893-1899: Victoria
- Source: Cricinfo, 26 July 2015

Henry Maplestone (11 January 1870 – 10 December 1949) was an Australian cricketer. He played four first-class cricket matches for Victoria between 1893 and 1899.

== See also ==
- List of Victoria first-class cricketers
