= William Gaggin =

Irish-born Australian cricketer

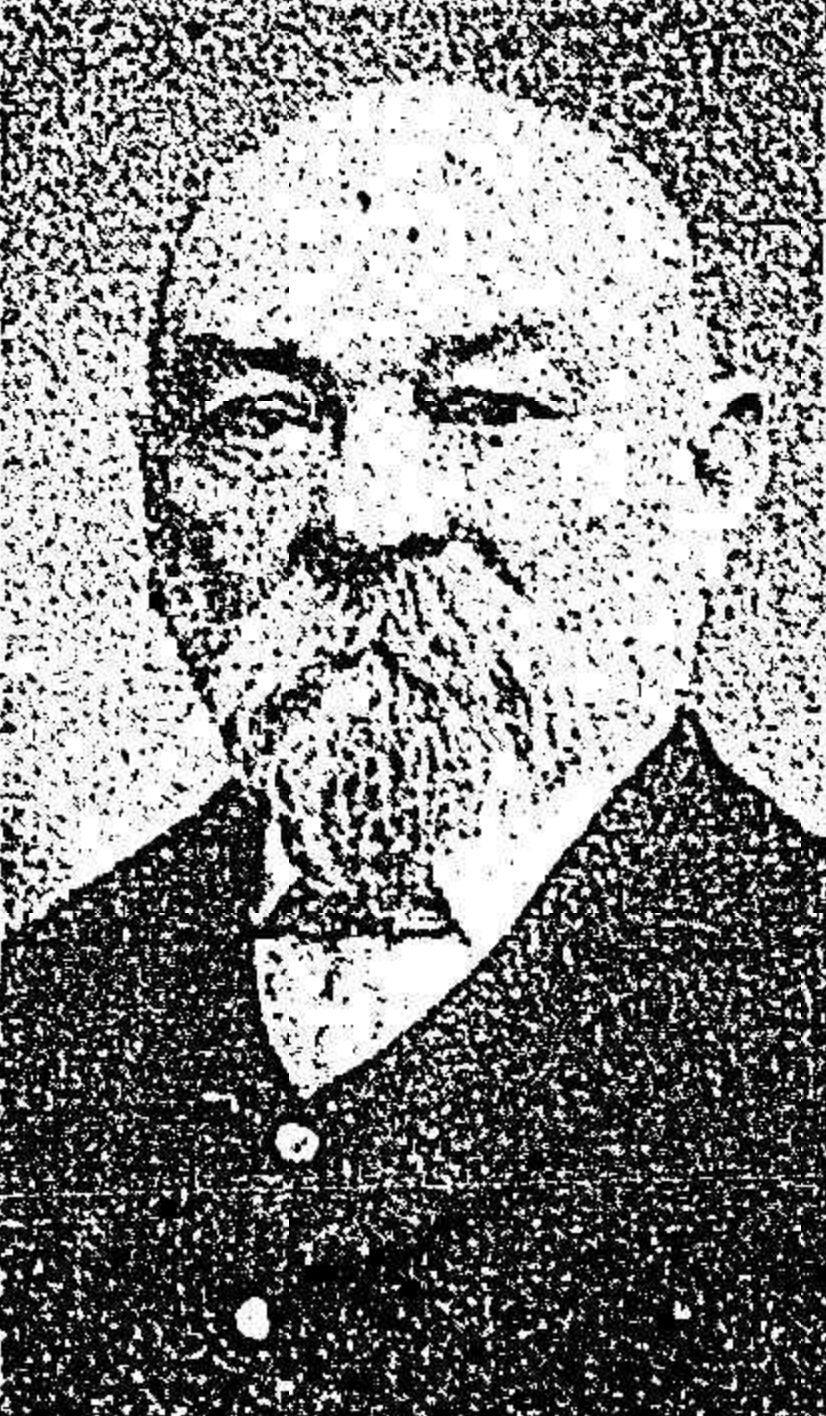
- Gaggin in 1908

Personal information
- Full name: William Wakeham Gaggin
- Born: 23 November 1847; County Cork, Ireland
- Died: 5 July 1925 (aged 77); Melbourne, Australia
- Batting: Right-handed

Domestic team information
- Years: Team
- 1868/69–1872/73: Victoria
- Source: Cricinfo, 3 May 2015

William Gaggin (23 November 1847 – 5 July 1925) was an Australian cricketer. He played three first-class cricket matches for Victoria between 1869 and 1873. Gaggin also played Australian rules football for Melbourne Football Club and Carlton Football Club.
