= Peter Hosking (cricketer) =

Australian cricketer (born 1932)

Personal information
- Born: 30 September 1932 (age 94); Melbourne, Australia

Domestic team information
- Years: Team
- 1958: Victoria
- Source: Cricinfo, 3 December 2015

Peter Mowat Hosking (born 30 September 1932) is an Australian former cricketer. He played one first-class cricket match for Victoria in 1958.

== See also ==
- List of Victoria first-class cricketers
