= Bill Lawry =

Australian cricketer (born 1937)

Personal information
- Full name: William Morris Lawry
- Born: 11 February 1937 (age 89); Thornbury, Victoria, Australia
- Height: 188 cm (6 ft 2 in)
- Batting: Left-handed
- Bowling: Left-arm medium
- Role: Opening batsman

International information
- National side: Australia (1961–1971)
- Test debut (cap 219): 8 June 1961 v England
- Last Test: 3 February 1971 v England
- Only ODI (cap 4): 5 January 1971 v England

Domestic team information
- Years: Team
- 1956/57–1971/72: Victoria

Career statistics
Competition	Test	ODI	FC	LA
Matches	67	1	249	7
Runs scored	5,234	27	18,734	309
Batting average	47.15	27.00	50.90	51.50
100s/50s	13/27	0/0	50/100	1/1
Top score	210	27	266	108*
Balls bowled	14	0	266	0
Wickets	0	–	5	–
Bowling average	–	–	37.60	–
5 wickets in innings	–	–	0	–
10 wickets in match	–	–	0	–
Best bowling	–	–	1/3	–
Catches/stumpings	30/–	1/–	122/–	3/–
- Source: CricketArchive, 8 March 2008

William Morris Lawry AM (born 11 February 1937) is an Australian former cricketer and commentator who played for Victoria and Australia. He captained Australia in 25 Test matches, winning nine, losing eight and drawing eight, and led Australia in the inaugural One Day International match, played in 1971. Following his retirement, Lawry spent over 40 years as a commentator on Channel 9, and is considered as one of the game’s most iconic voices.

A left-handed opening batsman with a reputation for resolute defence, Lawry had the ability to spend long periods of time at the crease. As his career progressed, he wound back his strokeplay to the point where he was described by an English journalist as "the corpse with pads on". Lawry was unceremoniously dumped as captain and player for the final Test of the 1970–71 Ashes series in Australia. Lawry's sacking is regarded as one of the more distasteful incidents in Australian cricket history—he was not informed personally of the selectors' decision before the decision was first broadcast on radio and he only became aware of his fate when confronted by reporters. Lawry was part of the Nine Network cricket commentary team until 2018, by which time he had been in the role for 45 years.

== Early career ==
Lawry was born in the Melbourne suburb of Thornbury. He was given the names William Morris after the early Prime Minister of Australia, William Morris Hughes. His father Alfred played amateur cricket until the age of 51. Bill never saw his father play, who was aged 47 when Bill was born. Aged nine, he played competitive cricket for the first time with the Thornbury Presbyterian Church team. He spent three years there, as well as playing for Preston Technical School. When he was twelve, he entered Melbourne's district competition playing for Northcote's fourth team, working his way up to the First XI by the age of sixteen. At the time, he was apprenticed as a plumber and attending Preston Technical College. Lawry was selected for Victoria's Second XI at the age of seventeen. He made a duck against the South Australians and did not see any further action for the Seconds for the rest of the summer of 1954–55. The following season, Lawry was recalled to the Seconds and scored 183 against South Australia.

A few months before turning nineteen, Lawry made his debut for Victoria, against Western Australia at the Junction Oval in the 1955–56 season. He scored only three as the hosts took an innings victory and it was his only senior match of the season. He played in all but one of Victoria's matches in 1956–57, but had modest results. He passed fifty only twice, scoring 51 against Queensland in his fourth first-class match, and making 74 against South Australia two games later. He made only one and seven against arch-rivals New South Wales in a low-scoring match that ended in the first tie in Sheffield Shield competitions. He ended with only 248 runs at 20.66.

Lawry was dropped completely in 1957–58 and did not play a match for his state even though they were depleted with Test representatives overseas in South Africa. The left-hander stayed on the sidelines for the first half of the following season when the Test players returned. Recalled for Victoria's match against the touring English cricket team in 1958–59, he scored 24 and 22, failing to seize his opportunity against international opponents. He also bowled at first-class level for the first time, bowling two overs without success. However, he was retained in the team, and scored fifties in four of the remaining five innings of the season and ended with 361 runs at 60.16.

In 1959–60, the national team were away on an eight-Test tour of the Indian subcontinent, opening up opportunities for players in domestic cricket. Lawry played in all 10 of Victoria's inter-state matches. After starting the season with 70 and 50 not out against Western Australia, Lawry went into a form slump and accumulated only 56 runs in his next six innings. He scored 85 and 33 and took his maiden first-class wicket in the next match against South Australia, but his form remained modest until the end of the season. He scored fifties in consecutive matches before registering his maiden first-class century, 127, against Western Australia, before scoring an unbeaten 38 in the second innings to see the Victorians to their target of 46. He ended with 666 runs at 44.40 for the season.

His batting form remained modest at the start of the 1960–61 season, scoring only 148 runs in the first seven innings of the summer. In the first match of the season against South Australia, he took a wicket in each innings, the only time he took more than one wicket in a first-class match. His summer's total of two wickets was the most he ever took in a season.

He made his major breakthrough in the fifth match of the season when he hit 266 (after being dropped on 12) against New South Wales at Sydney in 1960–61, shortly before the Australian selectors chose the team for the 1961 Ashes tour. It was more than half of his team's 4/457. Lawry followed his double-century with scores of 66, 83 and 85 in consecutive innings, and then ended the interstate season with a 134 against Queensland. He had scored 840 runs at 56.00 up to that point in the season and was selected for the tour of England. He scored 202 runs at 50.50 in three warm-up matches before the Australians departed for the British Isles.

== Test debut ==
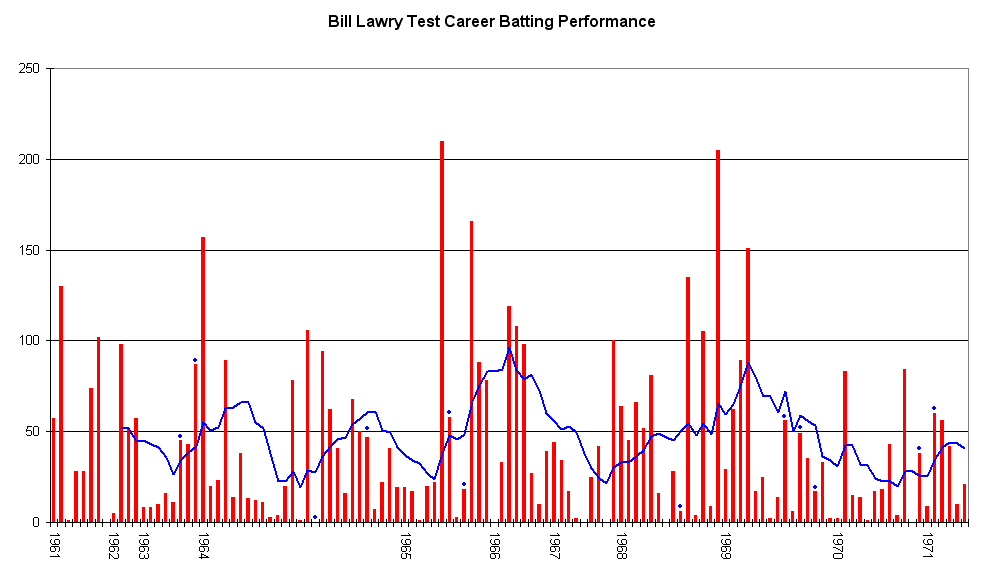
An innings-by-innings breakdown of Lawry's Test match batting career, showing runs scored (red bars) and the average of the last ten innings (blue line).

Lawry was sent to England as a backup opening batsman for the incumbent pair of Colin McDonald and Bob Simpson, who had performed well against the pace attack of the West Indies during the previous season and were expected to be retained for the Tests. Adapting quickly to English pitches, Lawry bounced back after failing to pass 30 in his first two matches to make his first century on the tour against Surrey at The Oval, which defeated Australia in the corresponding match on Australia's previous tour in 1956. This time, Lawry seized the initiative in an innings described by Wisden as "one of the most significant of the whole season" and "a flowering of technique and temperament". Batting for four and a half hours, Lawry scored 165, reaching his century in three hours. He compiled 101 runs between lunch and tea, producing an array of powerful drives through the off side, while his hooking prompted Denis Compton to compare him to Don Bradman. The Australians took a 180-run first innings lead and the Victorian opener made 22 not out to seal a ten-wicket win in the second innings. Lawry followed up with 100 and 24 not out in a nine-wicket triumph against Cambridge University and 104 on his first appearance at Lord's, against Marylebone Cricket Club (MCC), who boasted several Test players in their ranks. Continuing this form in the second innings, Lawry hit 84 and combined with Simpson (92*) to take Australia to 0/186, whereupon they declared and bowled the hosts out to win the match. He added 72 against Oxford University, and in eight matches leading into the Tests, Lawry had totalled 720 runs at 80.00.

Consequently, the selectors moved Simpson down the order to number six to accommodate Lawry for his Test debut in First Test at Edgbaston. In a drawn match, he made a steady 57 in Australia's only innings of 9/516 declared. Between Tests, he added an even 100 against Kent. His innings in the Second Test at Lord's—dubbed the "Battle of the Ridge"—was described by Wisden as "an indomitable effort of sheer graft under severe pressure with the ball flying about". Taking bruising blows from the hostile pace bowling of Fred Trueman and Brian Statham on a pitch with irregular bounce due to the presence of a ridge, Lawry reached 32 at stumps on the first day after England were bowled out for 206. The following day, Australia moved from 4/111 at lunch to 5/183 when Peter Burge was dismissed for 46 with Lawry on 99. Lawry resisted for six hours, to register his maiden Test century of 130, while no other batsman on either side passed 66. It helped Australia to take a match-winning first innings lead, eventually leaving a target in the double figures for the second innings. It was his fifth hundred of the tour, giving him over a thousand runs inside two months. Lawry continued his fine form in the two matches before the next Test, scoring 70 and 35 against Somerset and 122 against Lancashire. In the latter match, he took 1/24 from four overs, his only first-class stint with the ball during the whole tour, and his heaviest bowling workload in a first-class match.

Lawry then scored a pair of 28s as England squared the series at 1–1 in the Third Test in a low-scoring, three-day encounter at Headingley. He then scored against Northamptonshire. In the Fourth Test at Old Trafford, Lawry played a part of innings that was crucial in Australia winning the series. After making 74 in the first innings, he and Simpson put on an opening partnership of 113 in the second, the first century opening partnership of the series. Lawry went on to make 102, helping to set a match-winning target before skittling England on the final afternoon.

After the match-winning performance in Manchester, the latter stages of Lawry's tour were comparatively unproductive. He made a duck in his only innings in the drawn final Test at The Oval, and scored 109 against the Gentlemen of England, but made only two fifties in the last six first-class fixtures of the tour.

Nevertheless, Lawry topped the batting aggregates with 2,019 runs at 61.18 in first-class matches and 420 at 52.50 in five Tests. He struck the most centuries on tour, with nine triple-figure scores. Only Bradman and Neil Harvey had made over two thousand runs in an English tour since the Second World War. As a result, he was named as one of the five Wisden Cricketers of the Year in 1962.

== Later career ==
=== 1961-62 ===
Upon his return to Australia, he became the captain of Victoria for the 1961–62 season following the retirement of Test opener McDonald. A purely domestic season in 1961–62 saw Lawry in charge of his state for a full season. It was not a happy start for the new Victorian leader, as his men lost their first four matches. It was not until his fifth match in charge, against minnows Tasmania—who were not in the Sheffield Shield competition at the time—that the Victorians tasted victory. When the Shield competition resumed, Lawry's men were dealt a ten-wicket defeat and it was not until the next match, the sixth in the competition, that they avoided defeat, managed a draw against Queensland. The new skipper ended the season on a winning note, with an innings triumph over South Australia and seven-wicket victory over Western Australia. In spite of his team's poor form, Lawry remained productive with the bat, particularly against the dominant New South Wales, whose many Test players swept them to a ninth successive Shield title. The left-handed opener was one of the few to perform against the champions, scoring 65 and 113, and 97 and 67 in the respective matches, accumulating more than a third of his team's runs. He scored centuries in both matches against South Australia and ended with three triple-figures scores and three fifties for the season. In all, the Victorian skipper scored 832 runs at 51.68.

=== 1962-63 ===
Lawry made his Test debut on Australian soil in the First Test of the 1962–63 Ashes series at Brisbane. After making half-centuries in consecutive lead-in matches, he narrowly missed making a century in the drawn series opener, being dismissed for 98 in the second innings. Between Tests, Lawry scored 177 and 26 in a losing effort against the MCC for Victoria, and then made 133 in the next match against New South Wales, helping Victoria to an eight-wicket win, although he was jeered by an impatient gallery fed up with his slow batting.

The Second Test, his first in his home town of Melbourne saw two 50s, but an unhappy result as Australia went 1–0 down after losing by seven wickets. Lawry did not pass fifty again in the series, ending the drawn series with 310 runs at 34.44. Australian crowds became impatient with his dour and defiant style of batting. In the Fifth Test, Lawry had been ordered by captain Richie Benaud to occupy the crease and play out for a draw. He obliged with an unbeaten 45 in four hours on the final day, even though "the crowd booed, barracked and slow-clapped". At one point, he struck two fours in succession, prompting the crowd to yell "lightning does strike twice!" The unbeaten knock was part of barren run of 12 innings in which Lawry passed 20 only twice. The Victorian captain played in five of his state's Shield matches as they won the title and ended New South Wales' nine-year run. He ended the Australian season with 990 runs at 39.60.

=== 1963-64 ===
1963–64 saw a tour to Australia by South Africa. Lawry began well with 43 and 87* in a drawn First Test at Brisbane overshadowed by the no-balling of Ian Meckiff. Between Tests, the Victorian skipper continued his strong run with 73 and 130 not against Queensland and 94 against New South Wales. He then made his first century on home soil with 157 at the Melbourne Cricket Ground in the first innings of the Second Test. This helped propel Australia to a 173-run first innings lead and an eventual eight-wicket win that gave them a 1–0 lead. He made another half century in the Third Test in Sydney, scoring 89 in the second innings to help Australia to a safe position after they had ceded a 42-run first innings lead. Lawry then struck an unbeaten 187 for Victoria against the South Africans, but his form tailed away in the remaining two Tests, scoring 77 runs in the last two matches as the tourists won the Fourth Test by ten wickets to square the series. He ended the series with 496 runs at 55.11. The series was highlighted by new ball battles between Lawry and South African pace spearhead Peter Pollock. Pollock attempted to repeatedly bounce Lawry out, but removed Lawry in only three of ten innings. Pollock later nominated Lawry as one of the two hardest openers that he had ever bowled to. The Victorian skipper ended his Sheffield Shield campaign with 119 in a ten-wicket triumph over Western Australia but it was not enough for his team to hold onto their titles. He totalled 1340 runs at 67.00 for the season.

=== 1964 ===
1964 saw Lawry return to England, the venue of his first Test series. He started where he left off last time, scoring 50 and 79 against Worcestershire and 106 and 39 not out against Gloucestershire in the first two matches. However, his runs dried up in the three weeks leading up to the Tests, scoring only 119 runs in seven innings.

After failing to pass 20 in the first two Tests, he scored 78 in the first innings of the Third Test at Headingley, in which Australia took a 121-run first innings lead and went on to win by seven wickets to take a 1–0 series lead. With Australia only needing a draw in the Fourth Test at Old Trafford to retain the Ashes, Lawry scored 106, combining in a double century opening stand with Simpson which laid the platform for a total of 8/656 in over two days, as Australia batted England out of the match. The tourists' strategy was simply to bat as long as possible and to prevent any prospect of an English victory. The match only reached the second over of Australia's second innings, leading Wisden to note "a bad taste was left in the mouth of the cricket enthusiasts." Lawry proceeded to make 94 in the Fifth Test at The Oval, helping to secure a 197-run first innings lead and draw the match, retaining the Ashes 1–0. He ended with series with 317 runs at 39.62. Lawry had struggled in the tour matches between the Tests; in 11 innings, he made three 60s and seven scores below 20. After the Tests were over, Lawry was prolific, passing fifty six times in the eight innings of the last four first-class matches. This included centuries in each of the last three matches, 101 not out, 110 and 121 against Kent, AER Gilligan's XI and TN Pearce's XI respectively.

He made five centuries in the first-class matches on the tour.

=== 1964-65 ===
Australia made a visit to the Indian subcontinent on the way back home during the 1964–65 season, and the four Tests were the only fixtures scheduled. Lawry batted consistently and defiantly against the Indian spin attack led by Bhagwat Chandrasekhar in three Tests, compiling three half centuries and two 40s without managing to convert any into a century. Five of his six innings yielded between 47 and 68 runs. He ended the series with 284 runs at 56.80 as the series ended 1–1. In the same season Lawry failed to pass fifty in two one-off home and away Tests against Pakistan, aggregating 89 runs at 22.50 in four innings. The one-off Test was the only international match that Australia hosted in 1964–65 season, allowing the Victorian to lead his state in seven of their eight Shield matches. Lawry was in fine form, striking four centuries, including triple-figure scores in both matches against South Australia. He made an unbeaten 143 in the second innings of the states' first meeting, staving off defeat after the Victorians fell 248 runs behind after the first innings. He then scored 246 and 87 not out in the second match to set up a 111-run win. His team was not so successful, winning two and losing one of the seven matches. Lawry ended the Sheffield Shield campaign with 788 runs at 98.50.

The season ended with a tour to the West Indies. He managed only 79 runs in five innings in the first three Tests as Australia trailed 2–0, as both he and Simpson struggled against the express pace of Wes Hall and Charlie Griffith on grounds with no sightscreens.

However, they recovered to combine in a 382-run partnership in the Fourth Test in Bridgetown, Barbados. Lawry went on to make 210, his highest Test score, and added a further unbeaten 58 in the second innings of a high-scoring draw before Australia declared. This proved to be rather risky, as the hosts were only 10 runs short of the target when time ran out, but in any case, the draw was enough to ensure an unassailable 2–0 series lead. Primarily due to that match, he ended the series with 368 runs at 52.57, having made only 3 and 18 not out in the ten-wicket win in a low-scoring Fifth Test. Lawry was consistent in the tour matches against the various countries of the West Indies, his lowest score being 49 in six innings. He made 62 and 134 not out against Trinidad and Tobago and ended with 423 runs at 84.60 in these matches.

=== 1965-66 ===
Lawry had one of his best seasons in the 1965–66 Ashes series and "always seemed to be batting", his 592 runs (84.57) were the most in an Ashes series since Don Bradman in 1946–47 and his three centuries the most since Arthur Morris in 1948. He was in fine form in the four lead-up matches, hitting 160 in the opening game of the season against South Australia and 153 and 61 for the Victorians against the Englishmen. The Victorian skipper added fifties in the other two matches.

His 166 in the First Test in Brisbane helped Australia, in the absence of the incapacitated and unavailable Simpson, to set a total of 6/443 declared and force England to follow on, but they managed to hold on for a draw. Lawry continued his run scoring in the Second Test at Melbourne, compiling 88 in the first innings. Australia ceded a 200-run first innings lead and he made 78 in the second innings to help the hosts to 426 and safety. In the Third Test, Simpson was again sidelined and Lawry failed; his duck and 33 coincided with Australia losing the match in Sydney by an innings. After the match, Brian Booth, who was the regular vice-captain of the team to Simpson, and led the team in the First and Third Tests, was sacked after a barren run with the bat, and Lawry became the deputy. Between Tests, the Victorian ran into form in a match for the Tasmania Combined XI against England. He made 47 as the hosts collapsed for 199 in their first innings and then compiled an unbeaten 126 in the second innings to help wipe out a deficit of 272 and prevent defeat. Lawry scored 119 after combining in a record opening stand of 244 with Simpson in the Fourth Test in Adelaide to help level the series with an innings victory, the highest opening partnership for Australia against England and still the highest opening partnership against England at home. A further 108 in a 212 run stand with Bob Cowper in the Fifth Test helped ensure the match was drawn and the Ashes retained. Lawry scored 592 runs at 84.58. Including the tour matches against England, Lawry scored 979 runs at 97.90 against the touring side, occupying the crease for over 41 hours in a typically attritional style.

==== 1965–66 Victorian district cricket final ====
Lawry continued his marathon season with a remarkable performance in the final of the Victorian district cricket season, playing for Northcote Cricket Club against the Essendon Cricket Club. In 2000, the Victorian Cricket Association's Umpires Association voted it The District Match of the Century. The Essendon team included Ian Monks (captain), John Grant, Greg Brown, Barry Davis, Daryl Foster, Keith Kirby, and John Swanson; and, apart from Lawry, the team's captain, the Northcote team included Frank Brew, Ian Cowley, Tom Ryan and Paul Shanahan.

There was nothing unusual about Bill Lawry pulling off seemingly unending rearguard actions, but his marathon innings in the Victoria Cricket Association Premiership final of 1965-66 was perhaps the most outrageously unbelievable."

The match was played at the Albert Cricket Ground over four days — 2 April 9 April (Easter Saturday), 11 April (Easter Monday), and 16 April 1966 — to reach a first innings result: Essendon declared at 9/514 at tea on Day 2, and Northcote chased the total, making 5/516, with Lawry finishing 282 not out, having been at the crease for 509 minutes, faced 454 balls, and hit 32 fours.

=== 1966-67 ===
He was less successful in 1966–67 as Australia toured South Africa and lost the five Test series 3–1. In his first trip to Africa, Lawry struggled. In five first-class matches leading up to the Tests, he made starts without converting them into big scores, scoring 334 runs at 41.75 with four scores between 35 and 60.

Lawry's best score was 98 in the First Test in Johannesburg, which ended in defeat. Lawry's innings took Australia to a 126-run first innings lead, but the hosts made 620 in their second innings. Lawry then made 27 as Australia collapsed to a 333-run loss. His Test series performance declined as the tour went on, failing to pass 45 again and only managing 44 runs in his last four innings as the hosts dominated the series. He aggregated 296 runs at 29.60. He did have some success in the three remaining first-class matches, passing 50 in each one, including a 107 against Griqualand West. In the match against Orange Free State, the Victorian claimed his first wicket at first-class level for six years. In a limited-overs match against the South African XI, he struck 91 out of Australia's 8/323 but the hosts scraped home by three wickets.

== Captaincy ==
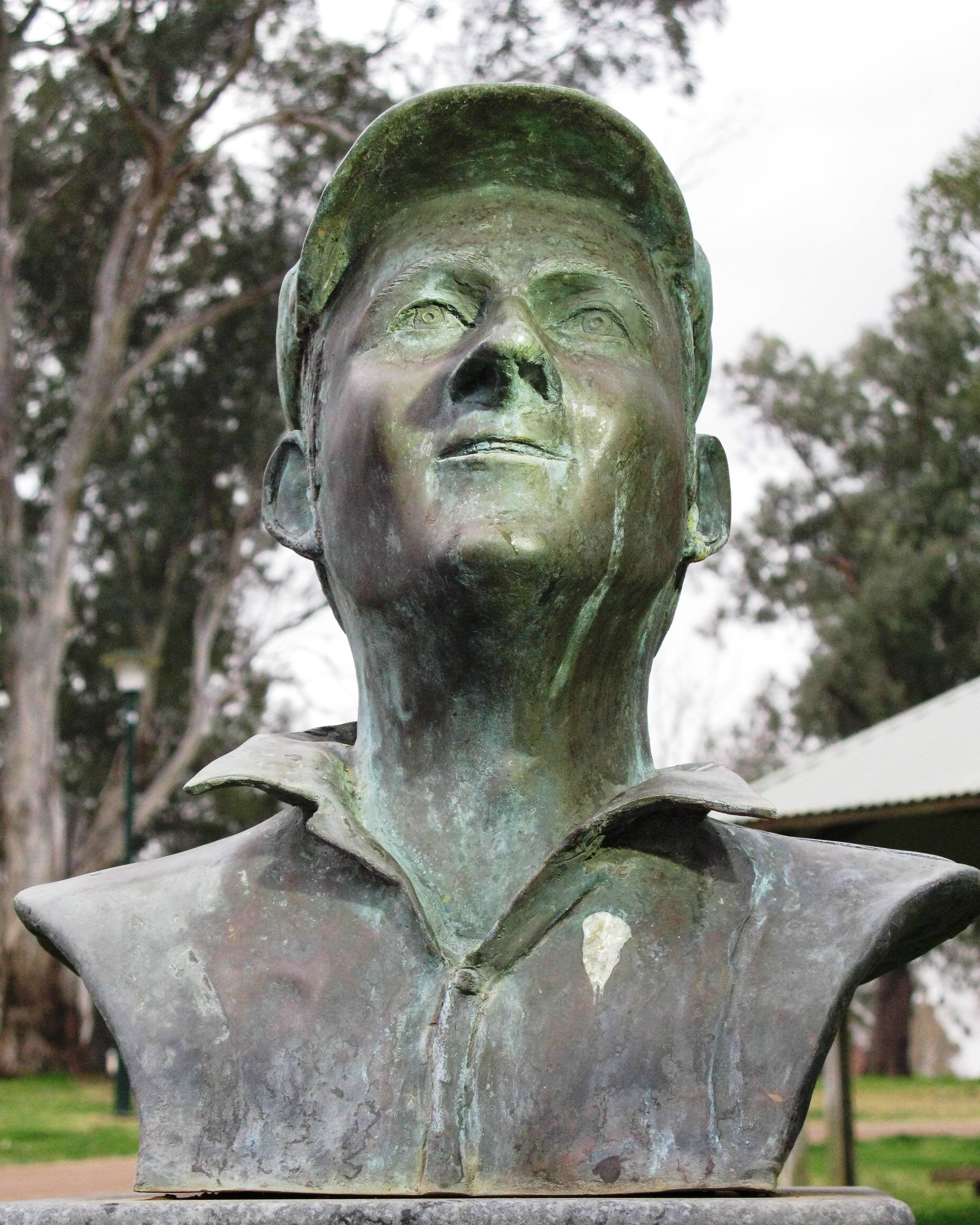
Bust of Bill Lawry

Lawry started the 1967–68 home series against India well. After compiling 42 and a duck in the First Test win, he made an even 100 in the Second Test in Adelaide to help secure an innings victory. After the Test, Lawry became Australian captain when Simpson stood aside having announced that he would retire from international cricket at the end of the series. His form remained consistent, scoring 64, 45, 66 and 52 in the two remaining Tests as Australia completed a 4–0 clean sweep. He had a productive summer with 369 runs at 52.71. In all first-class matches, Lawry made 805 runs at 47.35, adding a second century for the season in a vain attempt to prevent a Victorian defeat at the hands of Western Australia. Throughout the summer, Lawry made many start without converting them into large scores. In 17 innings, he made six half-centuries, all less than 70, and four scores in the forties. Under his leadership, Victoria won three and lost two of their seven Shield matches for the season.

Lawry's first full series in command was the 1968 Ashes tour of England. With Simpson now retired, the Australians were expected to struggle. The new Australian captain was in good touch in the opening tour matches, scoring three fifties in consecutive innings and aggregating 258 runs at 51.60 in a series of six rain-truncated lead-in matches.

He scored 81 in the first innings of the First Test as Australia took a 192-run advantage and complete a 159-run win to take a 1–0 lead. After failing in the next two drawn Tests, Lawry missed three weeks of cricket and the Fourth Test having sustained a broken finger in the previous Test. Up to this point, Australia had maintained their series lead against the run of play, aided by rain. In the Second Test, Lawry made a duck as Australia fell for 78, their lowest score since World War II. In the second innings he made 28 in Australia's 4/127. The tourists still needed 146 runs to make the hosts bat again, and were saved by rain, which washed out more than half the playing time. In the Third Test, Lawry was forced to retire hurt on six as Australia to England's 409 with 222. Due to inclement weather, England declared 329 runs ahead with seven wickets in hand and the Australians were 1/68 when the rain-shortened match ended.

In his absence, Barry Jarman led the team and adopted ultra-defensive tactics at the orders of Lawry, playing for a draw that guaranteed Australia would retain the Ashes. Lawry returned and made 27 and 46 in county matches before the final Fifth Test at The Oval.

In the first innings, he scored 135 in seven and a half hours as Australia fell behind by 170 runs. The innings was the first time that Lawry attracted the derisive description of a "corpse with pads on". In the second innings, he made four as Australia collapsed to be all out for 125 and lose by 226 runs. Rain had again threatened to deny England but they managed to finish off the tourists with five minutes to spare. He finished the series with 270 runs at 38.57. Lawry also struggled for form in the tour matches after the start of the Tests, with only one century and fifty in 12 innings, including 135 against Essex.

The five-Test series against the West Indies at home in 1968–69 saw the peak of Lawry's career as a batsman. After a fortuitous retention of the Ashes and patchy form in England, Lawry was back in form on Australian soil.

After registering a century and a fifty in five lead-in matches, he made 109 in the First Test in Brisbane but was unable to prevent defeat, as Australia trailed in a series for the first time under his leadership. He responded with 205 in the Second Test at Melbourne, setting up a total of 510 after asking the tourists to bat first and forcing an innings victory to square the series. After the Third Test saw a convincing ten-wicket victory, the captain making 29 in the first innings, Lawry scored 62 and 89 in a drawn Fourth Test in Adelaide. With Australia needing 360 to win, the captain got them off to a good start but they fell away and the last pair had to survive 26 balls at the end to save the match, 21 runs adrift of the target.

With the series at 2–1 leading into the Fifth Test in Sydney, Lawry struck 151 in the first innings after Australia were sent in to bat. The hosts made 619 and took a 340-run first innings lead, but their cautious captain let his team bat until they reached 8/394 to declare with a lead of 734, making 17 runs himself. The Australians still had enough time to take 382-run win and complete a 3–1 series win. His 667 runs at 83.38 was the highest series aggregate of his career. Lawry had expected a pace onslaught after Australia's last trip to the Caribbean had ended in defeat, but Wes Hall and Charlie Griffith had begun to slow down, taking their wickets at an average over 40.

=== India in 1969–70: historic win and riots ===
Lawry's last success as captain came during the five-Test tour to India in 1969–70. The 3–1 win was to be Australia's last Test series victory in India for 35 years, standing out among a series of subsequent failed attempts by Australian leaders to conquer the subcontinent. However, at the time, Lawry and Australia's victory was overshadowed by the public relations disasters that beset the tour.

The tour started with a stop in Ceylon, where the Australians played three non-limited-overs one-day matches and an unofficial Test. They won one of the one-dayers and the others were drawn, with much time lost to tropical downpours. Lawry made three fifties in his five innings.

Before the Tests got underway, Australia faced West Zone, and the skipper made 89 in a drawn match. Aside from the five Tests, the tourists would also play each of the five zones once. The First Test in Bombay saw Australia take a lead of 74 runs on the first innings. The match was marred by a controversial umpiring decision on the fourth day when Srinivas Venkataraghavan was given out caught behind in the second innings after missing the ball by roughly a foot. Most of the Australian players were dissatisfied with the events, feeling that the batsman had been robbed. In the meantime, the public address system declared that Lawry and his men had cheated. It resulted in crowd rioting and the crowd started to shout "Lawry, Lawry, Lawry". The spectators lit fires and threw projectiles at the Australians after Lawry refused to adjourn the match, contrary to police advice that warned them to run for their lives. During the chaos, Johnny Gleeson was hit in the head by a bottle, and when the teams left the field at the end of the Indian innings, Lawry was hit by a flying chair. Australia went on to reach the target of 64 and win by eight wickets after the Indians fell for 137, sparking off another riot. Former Indian captain Lala Amarnath defended Lawry, saying that he was not responsible for the umpiring error. Ajit Wadekar, who played in the match, said that "With a little graciousness, the unfortunate episode...could have been avoided". He said that an Australian win was inevitable, so Lawry should have adjourned the game and defused the riot. In another incident, Lawry threw his baggy green cap on the ground after the umpires adjourned play for the luncheon interval; Lawry felt that there was time for one more over. The Australian captain was not prominent with the bat in his team's win; he made 25 and 2.

After scoring 22 in an innings win over Central Zone, the teams played in the Second Test in Kanpur. Lawry made 14 in the first innings and was on 56 in the second innings as Australia reached 0/95 after the Indians set them 285 to win during the final day. After the drawn Test, Lawry rested himself from the match against North Zone.

The teams proceeded to Delhi for the Third Test. Australia batted first and took a 73-run lead on a spinning surface, although their captain only managed six. In the second innings, Lawry became the sixth Australian to carry the bat in Tests, making an unbeaten 49 as Australia collapsed for 107 against the spin of Bishan Singh Bedi and Erapalli Prasanna. Australia were confident that the Indians would not be able to make the target of 181 on a deteriorating pitch after 19 wickets had fallen for 167 on the second day. However, following the rest day, India comfortably won the match by seven wickets to square the series. Australian spinner Ashley Mallett claimed that India's Ashok Mankad later admitted that the hosts had switched the pitches on the rest day so they could bat on a favourable pitch. Australia then completed a 96-run win over East Zone in Guwahati, Lawry making 37 and 30.

During the Fourth Test at Eden Gardens in Calcutta, a surge in the demand for tickets caused a last day stampede, which resulted in running battles between fans and police, leaving six dead and hundred injured. This was exacerbated by protests by the Communist Party of India (CPI), a major political party in West Bengal, against Australian batsman Doug Walters. Walters had been conscripted during the Vietnam War period, although he was never sent to Vietnam to fight against the communist Viet Cong. Nevertheless, CPI activists erected posters across the city claiming that Walters had killed women and children. Around 10,000 communists picketed the Australian hotel and some eventually broke in and vandalised it.

On the field, after Lawry made 35 of Australia's 335 to create a 123-run lead, there were more riots following a second innings Indian batting collapse. Spectators on the top deck of the stands threw rocks, prompting those in the lower stands to invade the playing arena. This interrupted Australia's pursuit of 39 runs for victory, which was achieved without the loss of a wicket. During the stoppage, Lawry had an on-field altercation with a local photographer who had run onto the ground, pushing the pressman away with his bat. The Indian newspapers reported that Lawry had knocked the man over and then struck him with his bat. Lawry and his batting partner Keith Stackpole claimed that he had tried to shepherd the photographer from the playing area, who then stumbled and fell histrionically. The Australians reached their target of 39 with Lawry on 17 and all their wickets intact.

In any case, the crowd responded by stoning the Australian team bus as they left the ground following their victory. Following the incident, the Indian media began to wear black armbands and incited the populace against the Australians.

Even in the non-international tour matches, Lawry's team could not escape controversy. The next match against South Zone at Bangalore generated more allegations of cheating. Australia's reserve wicketkeeper Ray Jordon claimed that Alan Connolly had bowled Prasanna. Prasanna disagreed but eventually walked after Jordon repeatedly insisted that he was out. The Australians then had an altercation in the dressing room after some members accused Jordon of cheating, asserting that the delivery had missed the stumps. Lawry scored 120 in the first innings, his only century of the tour, as his colleagues collapsed to be all out for 195. This gave South a 44-run lead and they declared at 6/255 on the final day. Australia needed to bat for only two hours on the final day to salvage a draw, but a collapse had them at 8/90 with an hour left with Lawry still at the crease. Gleeson came out to bat and talked with both umpires at length before taking guard; he later claimed to teammates that he had threatened to hit the umpires in the head if they gave him out. Gleeson then padded every ball away without attempting a shot, but every leg before wicket appeal was rejected. In an attempt to waste time, Lawry pulled away from the wicket when a woman in a colourful sari walked into front of the sightscreen, leading to allegations that he had insulted Indian womanhood. In any case, the crowd expressed dismay at the Australian tactics by rioting and throwing rocks at the players. The match ended early because of the crowd trouble and Australia avoided being the first international team to lose to an Indian zone.

Following the match, many former Australian players called for the tour to be abandoned, citing the safety of the team. Nevertheless, the series continued and Lawry's men received a positive welcome upon arrival for the Fifth Test in Madras. Lawry made 33 as Australia batted first and made 258, taking a 95-run lead. He then fell for 2 as Australia collapsed for 153 in the second innings to give the hosts an opening, but they won the match in just over three days by 77 runs to clinch the series 3–1, but Lawry's team left India with Australia's reputation severely dented. Perhaps as a result of the controversy, Lawry could only manage 239 runs at 34.14 for the series. On reflection, Lawry stated "It was the toughest tour I've ever been on. There were very pleasant memories on the field, but very unpleasant ones from the accommodation, the type of travel, the food we were getting and lack of support we were getting from the board."

Following the tour, Lawry wrote a series of newspaper articles that criticised the Board of Control for Cricket in India (BCCI) and their treatment of the Australian team. The BCCI complained to the Australian Board of Control, objecting to Lawry's "exaggerated and baseless" statements. The ABC replied to express "appreciation at the high level of hospitality and interested exhibited by Indian cricket authorities and the public". Lawry's official report to the board criticised the level of security and insurance for the players. Lawry said

=== Whitewashed by South Africa ===
Lawry's men left directly for South Africa. Already tired, they confronted fast and bouncy pitches in contrast to low, slow and dusty spinning pitches in India. Upon arrival, Lawry declared Ian Chappell to be the best batsman in the world, something that would come back to haunt him. For his part, the Australian commentator Alan McGilvray said that when they arrived in Johannesburg, the Australians "looked haggard. Their eyes seemed to be standing out of their heads and some of them looked positively yellow." The Australians played their first match of the tour within a week of leaving the subcontinent. Prior to this first match, most of the team were seen sleeping on the benches at the ground half an hour before play was due to start. Initially, it appeared that the Australians were unaffected by the long campaign and change in conditions; they won their first two lead-in matches against their provincial sides by an innings and ten wickets respectively, Lawry scoring 86 against North Eastern Transvaal and 157 against Griqualand West, finishing unbeaten on both occasions. They drew the third match against Eastern Province, Lawry again unbeaten twice on 9 and 43.

After two weeks of preparation, the tour went awry for the Australians. They fell to a 170-run loss in the First Test in Cape Town, with Lawry giving finger gestures to the crowd and continuously arguing with the umpires. The Australian skipper managed only 2 in the first innings as the hosts took a 218-run lead that set up the match. Lawry scored 83 in the second innings, which was to be the highest Australian score for the series, an indication of his team's lack of batting form. At the end of the match, angered by officiating that he considered to be unacceptable, Lawry refused to accept a presentation by the two umpires. The series moved on to Kingsmead at Durban. Host captain Ali Bacher outwitted Lawry by persuading the Australian skipper to toss long before the start of play. Bacher won the toss and decided—against conventional wisdom—to bat first on a green pitch that would normally offer assistance to the bowlers. Immediately after, ground staff ran onto the field and cut off all the grass, making it ideal for batting, thereby giving the South Africans the advantage. Knowing the rules in greater detail, Bacher had tricked Lawry. The laws of cricket allowed for the wicket to be mown up to half an hour before the start of play, so Bacher had talked Lawry in tossing early so that he could change the pitch condition to advantage his team. South Africa amassed 9/622 declared and Australia fell to its first innings defeat in four years, folding for 157 and 336. Lawry could not see off the hosts' opening bowlers, falling for 15 and 14, as South Africa took a 2–0 lead. The last two Tests brought no respite, as South Africa registered two large victories by 307 and 323 runs respectively. Lawry only managed 79 runs in the last two Tests, and passed 20 only once. Bacher's side, which was regarded as one of the finest in Test history, had inflicted what remains the heaviest Test series defeat in Australian cricket history. Lawry's men did not win any of the three matches against provincial sides after the start of the Tests, meaning that they went eight matches without victory.

In the four Tests, sixteen catches were dropped, with around 60 dropped in a total of 12 first-class matches, while the tired pace spearhead Graham McKenzie took 1/333 and was thought to be suffering from hepatitis. Behind the scenes, the South African Cricket Board approached the Australian Cricket Board attempting to organise a Fifth Test. The players were unreceptive to this after spending five months overseas in what was then an amateur sport. The proposed extra match fell through after a pay standoff led behind the scenes by Ian Chappell, later to spearhead the breakaway World Series Cricket (WSC), which offered players substantial remuneration. The dispute was the genesis of WSC, and on the team's return to Australia, Lawry sent the Board a letter expressing player grievances. According to Chappell, "That was the end of Lawry as captain of Australia. Then it was just a matter of finding any excuse to get rid of him." Lawry was largely ineffective, with 193 runs at 24.13 with only one half century in the First Test. Apart from media criticism of the team's performances, Lawry was also slated for refusing to make a speech at the end of the series and refusing a gift from an umpire at the end of the Fourth Test. Lawry also had personal differences with Ian Chappell, Doug Walters, Ashley Mallett and Brian Taber, which reduced morale and led to a deterioration in Australia's performances on the field.

=== Sacking ===
The 1970–71 home series against England was the longest in Test history, with six Tests scheduled and another added when the Third Test was washed out. Lawry was to bow out of international cricket in one of the most acrimonious series in Test history. Lawry had gone through a difficult phase on the previous tour, with only 432 runs at 28.80 in nine Tests on the tour of India and South Africa. With Australia losing, and as a non-smoker and non-drinker, he became more distant from many of his own teammates. Lawry had been under pressure after a highly critical report by team manager Fred Bennett. Australia went to the series with confidence after the tourists were unable to win any of their four opening tour matches. Lawry had success in his preparation, scoring 87 and 58 not out in a ten-wicket win over Western Australia at the start of the season.

During the series, Lawry increasingly came under criticism for some uninspiring leadership marked by a safety-at-all-costs strategy. The First Test in Brisbane was drawn after both teams had passed 400 in the first innings, the visitors taking a 31-run lead, but not before Lawry had top-scored with 84 in the second innings as his team collapsed to be all out for 214. The Second Test was drawn after England made 397 and Australia replied with 440, Lawry making a duck and 38 not out as the hosts batted out the match in the second innings. The Third Test was washed out without a ball being bowled due to rain. In response to this, a Seventh Test was scheduled and the first-ever One Day International was scheduled in place of the washed out match. Australia won the inaugural match by five wickets with five overs to spare, Lawry making 27 in his only ODI.

In the Fourth Test at Sydney, England took a series lead with a 299-run win after taking a 106-run first innings lead and setting Australia 415 for victory. Lawry's critics became more vocal, despite a defiant unbeaten 60 carrying his bat as Australia collapsed and fell for 116 in the second innings. It was England's largest victory in terms of runs over Australia for 34 years. His own batting saw him described by Ian Wooldridge as "a corpse with pads on". According to Ray Robinson, Lawry "appeared to be expecting the worst and getting it often enough to expect more of the same". The selectors responded by axing both of Australia's frontline pace duo of McKenzie and Connolly for the Fifth Test.

Lawry declared in the Fifth Test with Rod Marsh within eight runs of a maiden Test century (and what would have been the first-ever Test century by an Australian wicketkeeper) after the hosts batted first and reached 9/493, the captain making 56 himself. Australia continued to play defensively, and after making 42 in the second innings, the skipper declared and set the tourists 271 in less than a day, and the match petered out to a draw with Australia still behind in the series. Another draw in the Sixth Test meant that Australia needed a win to draw the series and retain the Ashes. After taking a 235-run first-innings lead, England did not need to take a risk with their series lead with a bold declaration and set Australia a world-record 469 runs for victory. The hosts were 3/328 when time ran out, and Lawry made only 10 and 21. Lawry had batted for more than 24 hours in the series, averaging around 13 runs an hour.

With Lawry's defensive leadership under heavy fire, he was dropped along with three other players, becoming the first Australian captain to be sacked in the middle of a series. He was not informed privately by the Board and only found out after his axing was made public. The Australian selectors Don Bradman, Sam Loxton and Neil Harvey had delayed the announcement while they tried to locate Lawry at the end of the Sixth Test, but he had already left for his home in Melbourne and they were unable to find him. He first heard the news on the radio and the selectors were much maligned in the press as a result. Lawry never played for Australia again, despite being only 33 years old and averaging 47.15, but immediately began his almost 50-year career as a commentator in the Seventh Test, saying, "Well, I suppose we all have to get around to it some day". Two days earlier, after lengthy discussion, the ACB had voted 7–6 to acknowledge and respond to Lawry's letter following the South African tour, although their reply did not directly address Lawry's concerns. His successor, Ian Chappell, condemned the Board's actions as "unbelievable". Immediately after his appointment, the Chappell told his then-wife, "The bastards won't get me the way they got Bill," and he later went out on his own terms. Victorian and Australian teammate Paul Sheahan said of Lawry, "The fact that no-one had the courage to tell him he was to lose his job as Australian captain was disgraceful." At the same time, Sheahan said that Lawry was "a bit of an autocrat" and "not the sort of captain who stood alongside you and drew the best out of you."

Lawry was publicly dignified, and later reflected that he had "no anger at all".

Australia went on to lose the final Test and the series 2–0. Lawry played out the remaining two matches of the season for Victoria, scoring two fifties.

The following season, Lawry continued playing for Victoria, leaving himself available for an international recall. He scored 116 not out against Western Australia and added four further fifties, three against South Australia. He added his only limited-overs century during the summer, scoring 108 not out in a win over South Australia. He totalled 488 runs at 44.36 for the first-class season, but was not recalled to the Test team during the summer. Neither was Lawry recalled for the 1972 tour of England, and in his absence Australia was unable to find a reliable opening partnership. Australia's opening stand exceeded 24 only once in the Test series.

Lawry retired from first class cricket at the end of the 1971–72 season, bowing out with a three-wicket win over South Australia. He played a further three seasons of district cricket, crossing after 19 seasons with Northcote to the wealthier St Kilda Cricket Club; as captain-coach from 1972–73 to 1974–75, he earned $3000 per year to supplement his lost international cricket income, before retiring altogether.

== Playing style ==
Along with Bob Simpson, he formed an opening partnership that was regarded as one of the finest in Test history. Lawry was fast between the wickets, and the pair were especially well known for their understanding, as exemplified by their fluency in rotating the strike with quick singles. Lawry was known for his peculiar stance. He had little bend in his knees, and as a result batted with a stoop over his bat. He used his long reach to blunt spin bowling. He played with a very straight bat, combining well-organised defence with a somewhat limited range of strokes, marked by an efficiency of placement and an unusually heavy reliance on the hook shot. His strengths were regarded as his composure and intense concentration which powered a relentless single-mindedness. His defiant style was accentuated by his habit of tugging on his cap after every ball, as though starting afresh. Lawry was also a left-hander during his winter baseball recreation, which equipped him with a powerful throwing arm.

== Commentary career and later work ==
After retiring from playing, Lawry worked as a commentator on radio and television, firstly with Channel 7 and then Channel 0 Melbourne, before joining Channel 9 television, beginning in the days of World Series Cricket in the 1977-78 season. His distinctive, enthusiastic and excitable style has often been parodied, especially in The Twelfth Man series; in addition to his persistent use of cliches, the Victorian was known for his signature catchcries, particularly "Got him! Yes! He's gone!" when a wicket fell, "It's all happening!" in reference to a see-sawing or chaotic passage of play, and "Bang!" (when a batsman attempted a big hit) and for his love of racing pigeons. Lawry's long-running, argumentative but humorous commentary partnership with the South African-born former English captain Tony Greig was a mainstay of the Nine Network's commentary offering for 33 years, ending with Greig's death in December 2012.

During the late 1980s and early 1990s, Lawry was the cricket manager of the Victorian Cricket Association, helping to recruit players for the Victorian team.

From 2013, Lawry scaled back his ball-by-ball commentary to international matches played in Melbourne such as the Boxing Day Test, and in Sydney for the New Year Test. In May 2018, he confirmed his retirement from broadcasting and commentary.

== Legacy ==
In Australia a bottle opener is sometimes called a Bill Lawry, on account of him being a famous opener. Also a breed of pigeon (racing) is commonly known as the Lawry bird after his love of pigeon racing.

The Westgarth Street Oval in Northcote was renamed the Bill Lawry Oval. In 2010, Lawry was inducted into the Australian Cricket Hall of Fame.
