= Brunswick Cricket Club =

Cricket club in Melbourne, Australia

- Founded: 23 November 1857; 168 years ago
- League: Victorian Sub-District Cricket Association, Victorian Premier Cricket
- Based in: Melbourne, Australia
- Home ground: A.G Gillon Oval
- Colours
- Anthem: Flying High
- President: Rod Browning - (2022-Current)
- Coaches: Hamid Qadri (Men) Ken Smith (Women)
- Website: brunswick-cc.com

The Brunswick Cricket Club is based in Melbourne, Australia. The club was founded over 150 years ago and currently fields four senior men's teams in the Victorian Sub-District Cricket Association (VSDCA) along with four Mercantile Cricket Association (MCA) sides, a senior women's team, all abilities and numerous junior sides.

== History ==
=== 1857–1900: Formation ===
Brunswick Cricket Club was conceived during a meeting at the Cumberland Arms Hotel on November 23, 1857, after an advertisement in The Argus newspaper asked for men interested in playing cricket. After playing informally against Yarra (Heidelberg), Williamson Alliance and Phoenix Park the club began formally in official competitions in 1901. Brunswick first played in the Victorian Junior Cricket Association at the club's first home ground on the east side of Sydney Rd, close to the Barkley Brick Company. Later Brunswick would relocate to the McAlister Oval, now the home of Parkville District Cricket Club. In 1907, the Brunswick Cricket Ground was constructed at a cost of £3,600, and the club was invited to join the VSDCA shortly afterwards in 1909/10. By 1914/15, the First and Second Elevens had won Brunswick's first VSDCA premierships. During these early years, John Curtin, Australian Prime Minister, played both cricket and football for Brunswick.

=== 1900-1950: Glory Years ===
In 1909, the Brunswick Cricket Club joined the Victorian Sub-District Cricket Association and eventually moved to A.G. Gillon Oval, which remains as the club's home ground today. From the early days Brunswick established a reputation as the powerhouse of the competition, remaining undefeated across two seasons in 1928/29 and 1929/30. The club went on to win six premierships in seven seasons from 1939/40 to 1945/46. Over these decades, William J. Dowling won the first eleven batting award fifteen times and the bowling award once. Bill was captain of the 1928/29 Premiership team, while other notable players during this period included former Australian Test players Bert Ironmonger and Morris Sievers. Ironmonger returned to Brunswick aged 51 and took 62 wickets at 9.53 in 1936/37. During his time as captain, Ironmonger oversaw the development of young wicketkeeper named Bill Jacobs. Jacobs would follow Brunswick players Morris Sievers and Roy Gardiner to play District Cricket with the Fitzroy Cricket Club in 1937. Jacobs played 266 consecutive matches for Fitzroy between 1937–38 and 1955–56, before moving into cricket administration. Bill served as a Victorian Cricket Association (VCA) Delegate from 1957-58 to 1968-69, as a State Selector from 1959-60 to 1971-72 (and 1982-83), and as Assistant Secretary of the VCA in 1973-74. Bill managed Australian teams to South Africa (1966–67) and the West Indies (1973), as well as managing the Rest of the World team in Australia (1971–72) at the request of the Australian Cricket Board. He was awarded Cricket Victoria life membership following his retirement as a delegate in 1969. Bill's son Ken Jacobs also played cricket for Brunswick. From 1980-2007 Ken was CEO of Cricket Victoria, in Melbourne Australia. In the year 2000 Ken was awarded the Australian Sports Medal by the Australian Government for his services to cricket.

=== 1950-2000: Return to the Top ===
Following the return of club legends John 'Nooky' Swanson and Tom O'Neil from Essendon Cricket Club in 1974, Brunswick again saw another golden period. Bill Hillhouse was appointed captain coach after captaining Carlton to a District Premiership in 1968/69. What was extraordinary about this was his team was undefeated for the entire season, the only time this has happened in Premier Crickets 100+ years of existence. Brunswick won back-to-back First XI VSDCA championships in 1975/76, 1976/77 before performing the premiership double again in 1980/81 and 1981/82.

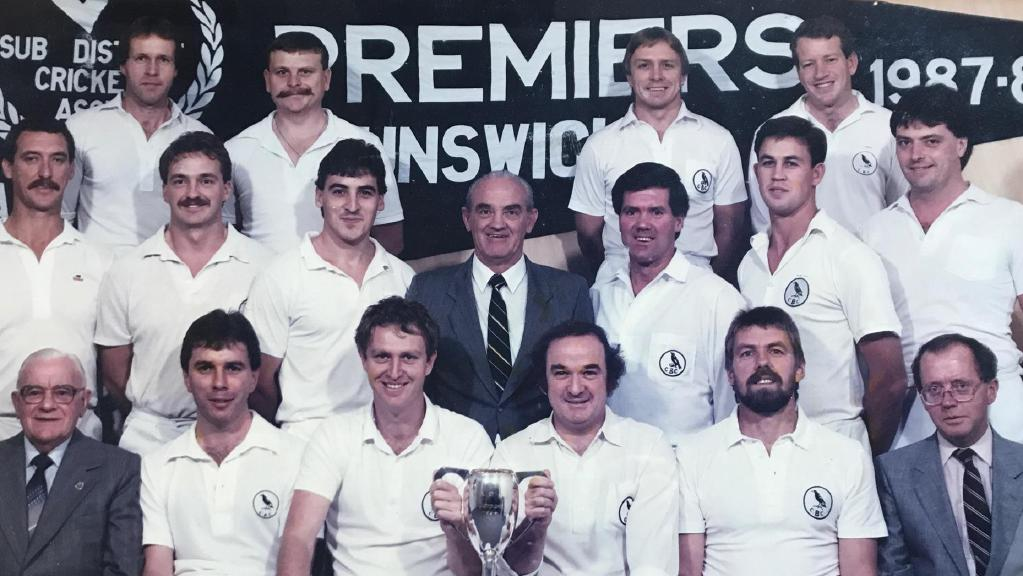
Brunswick's 1987-88 VSDCA premiership team

Brunswick's last First XI premiership came in the 1987/88 season and this side was captained by John Mulligan. The side finished fourth in the regular season before beating Malvern, Box Hill and Altona in the finals campaign. The Championship game against Altona saw club legend John Swanson sharing a decisive 143-run partnership with VSDCA games record holder and fellow Hall of Famer Geoff Turner, as Brunswick recovered from 4-75 to 5-218, Turner compiling 56 before Swanson went on to reach triple figures. However, Brunswick squandered a golden opportunity to post a total in excess of 300, losing 6-25 to be all out for 243. Altona's reply mirrored the Wicks’ innings, stumbling to 5-130 before a 78-run sixth-wicket stand put the championship within its reach. A run out changed the course of the contest before Mick Drinkall ripped through Altona's lower-order. The A's lost 5-20 and were skittled for 228, Drinkall finishing with 5-59 from 23.1 overs which included eight maidens.

From 1975 to 1988, Brunswick won 12 premiership flags across all grades with club legend Blair Hillhouse captaining four first XI premierships.

Team of the Half-Century
The best Brunswick team from 1950-2000 was selected to celebrate the club's centenary in 2000.
These players are listed below in alphabetical order.

Name	Seasons	Years	Runs	Wickets
Blair Hillhouse (Captain)	16	(1974/75- 1989/90)	4699	
Ray Biffin	4	(1971/72-1974/75)	895	69
Dave Cranston	16	(1948/49-1963/64)	3558	552
Kevin Dillon	15	(1955/56-1973/74)	3555	30
John Hedley	7	(1983/84-1989/90)	2018	
Derrick Hiho	5	(1972/73-1976/77)	1702	16
Fred Leslie	6	(1948/49-1962/63)	1753	1
Paul McGinty	19	(1976/77-1995/96)	766	557
Tom O’Neill (Wicketkeeper)	9	(1957/58-1975/76)	2296	236 dismissals
John Swanson	23	(1956/57-1989/90)	7107	313
Geoff Trivett	3	(1968/69-1970/71)	538	175

=== 2000-present: Growing Women's Cricket ===
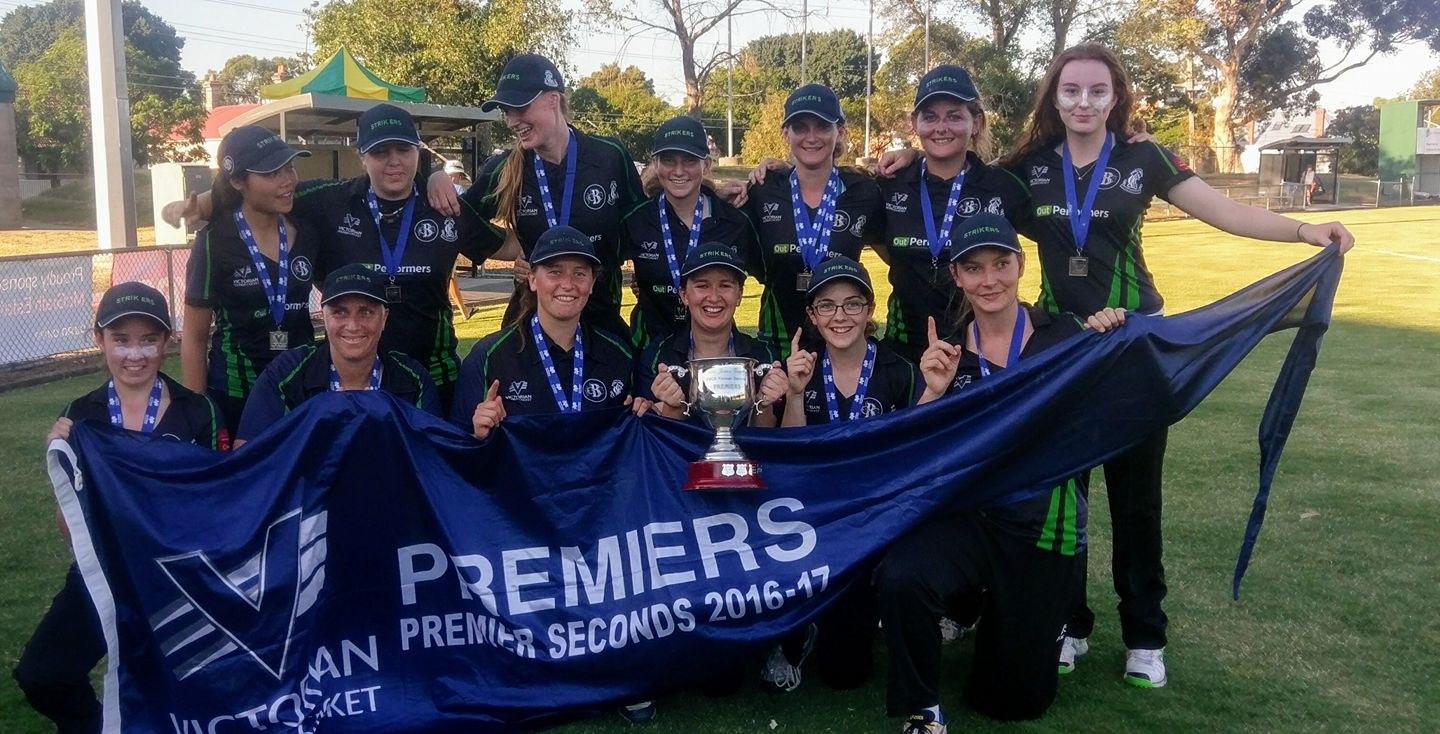
Carlton-Brunswick Strikers 2016/17 Premiership

Brunswick formed its first independently run senior women's team in 2014/15. In only their second season, the Brunswick women claimed the Women's Community Cricket T20 final and finished runner-up in the One Day competition. Following this success, the Brunswick Cricket Club's women's side partnered with the Carlton Cricket Club to form the 'Carlton Brunswick Strikers' in 2016/17. In their first season of in the Second Division of the Victorian Premier Cricket the side won a momentous Grand Final over Ringwood.

In 2015/16, the captain/coach pairing of David Mckay and Karl Mayne, both also former Essendon players, lead the men's First XI to back into finals cricket after a three-year absence. The 15/16 Twilight T20 side also performed well making the Grand Final with guest players including Clint McKay and Cam Stevenson.

The 2018/19 season marked the promotion of the Carlton/Brunswick Strikers into the Premier grade of Victorian Premier Cricket with Addy Campion and Karl Mayne as the captain and coach for the inaugural season. The men's side saw former Hatch Medalist Liam Murphy take the reins with captain/coach duties. while the Second XI led by Captain Evan Smith broke a 77-year drought in winning a tense Grand Final with a remarkable comeback over Preston. Alex Halls was named Player of the Match with the figures of 5/28.

== Notable players ==
=== William J Dowling ===
Bill Dowling joined Brunswick in 1907/08 before moving to Carlton in 1910/11, where he played six games. The following year, Bill returned to Brunswick and captained the club's first premiership in 1914/15, making 77 runs opening the batting in the final. Bill also played in consecutive premierships in 1928/29 and 1929/30 making 122 in the latter final. In his first 13 seasons with Brunswick which was interrupted by a period of enlistment in the armed forces, he won the batting average on 11 occasions. Not only an outstanding batsman, Bill was also considered a brilliant cover-point fieldsman.

Bill Dowling's record at Brunswick:
Played 249 games between 1909 and 1935, Fourth highest VSDCA run-maker with 8895 runs @ 30.67, 12 centuries and 43 fifties, Represented the VSDCA on 13 occasions, Won the 1st XI batting average on 15 occasions, Brunswick CC life membership.

=== John D Swanson ===
Local Brunswick boy John "Nooky" Swanson joined the Brunswick Cricket Club as a 14-year-old in 1955/56. After starting in the fourth XI, John had made his way to the First team by the next season. At 20, John went to the Essendon Cricket Club where he played 123 First XI matches during 11 seasons from 1962/63. One of his five grand finals for Essendon (two of which were successful) was the famous match against Northcote, when former Test captain Bill Lawry made an inspired 282 not out to win the game. John went on to represent Victoria in state cricket on 29 occasions between 1965/66 and 1969/70. He joined the elite of all rounders by making both a century, a score of 156, as well as taking five wickets in an innings, 6/74 for Victoria. His fielding was extraordinary too, taking 47 catches in 29 matches.

After returning to Brunswick in 1974/75, 'Nooky' played a further 18 seasons in the first eleven, which included three premierships and a championship win. In the 1987/88 championship final, John made 100 and took a vital wicket near the end as Brunswick dismissed Altona to win by 15 runs. John's performance won him the 'JL Seelemeyer Trophy' for Player of the Final.

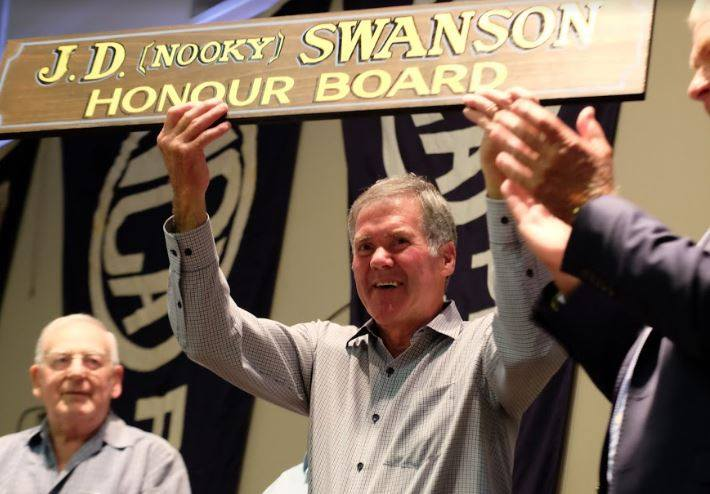
John Swanson Honour Board

John was a damaging left-handed batsman and one of the most brilliant gully fieldsmen in the country, and was also considered the best outfielder with an arm to match. Making use of the skills he gained in his baseball career. John was a regular in the Australian team for 20 years, winning the Claxton Shield batting title in 1967-1968 and the Helms Award as MVP in 1968. He was selected as centre field for The Victorian and Australian Baseball Association team of the 20th Century and in 2005, John was an inaugural inductee into the Baseball Australia Hall of Fame.

In 2017, John was recognised for his outstanding contribution to Brunswick through a tribute night celebrating his exceptional career. The night concluded with John being presented with the 'John Swanson Honour Board' which now hangs on the wall of the Gillon Oval club rooms.

John Swanson's record at Brunswick:
273 1st XI games, 7107 runs @ 30.24, 10x100's and 28x50's, 311 wickets @17.03, 7 batting averages, 2 bowling averages, 11 club championships, Brunswick CC life member, 1976/77 Hatch Medallist.

=== Cameron Stevenson ===
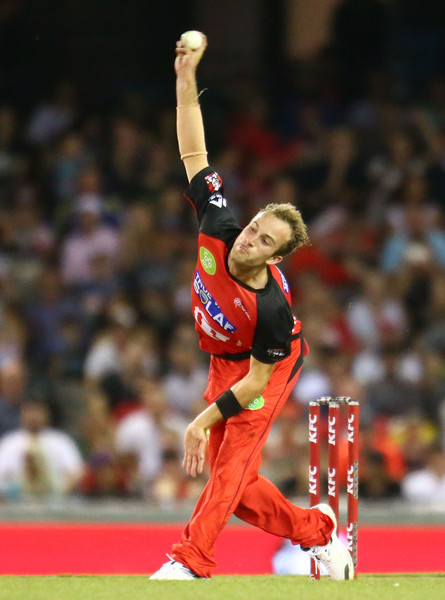
Cameron Stevenson playing in the Big Bash with Melbourne Renegades

Cameron Stevenson played junior cricket with Brunswick from 2003, before moving to the senior squad in 2008/09 and making his First XI debut in 2009/10.

After one season in Victorian Premier Cricket with Geelong Cricket Club, Cam moved to Carlton Cricket Club in 2012/13. Through his first season at Carlton, Cam worked is way through the grades to make his First XI debut. From 2015-16, he became one of the competitions most fearsome bowlers.

Cam was rewarded with a Big Bash T20 debut for the Melbourne Renegades against the Sydney Sixers on 23 December 2015, before he moved from Victoria to Tasmania for the 2016–17 Sheffield Shield season, making his first-class debut on 4 November 2016.

In 2014/15, Cam returned to Brunswick to play in the T20 side as a 'special guest player'. Cam played a leading role in taking the side to final, eventually finishing runners-up to Oakleigh.

=== David McKay ===
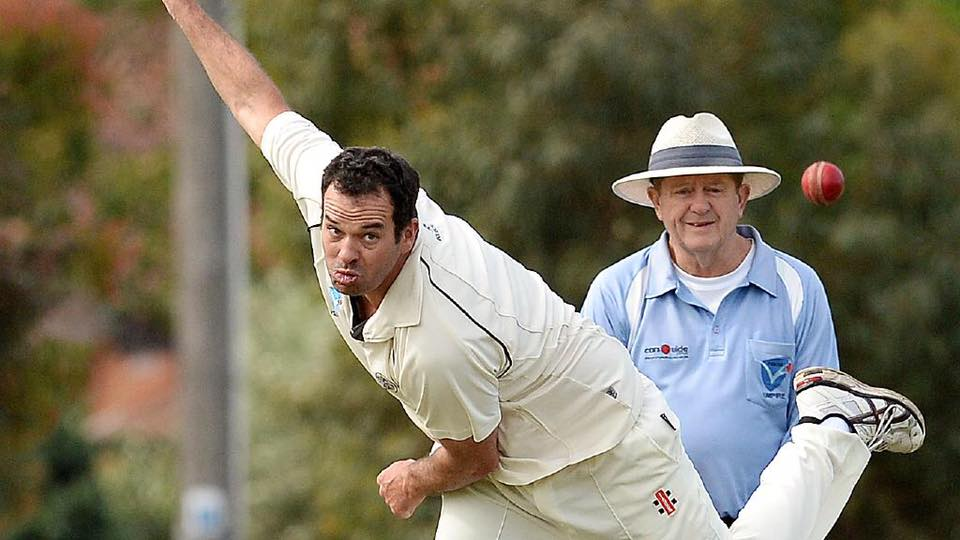
David McKay bowling at A.G Gillon Oval in 2015

David McKay joined Brunswick from premier cricket club Essendon in 2010/11, taking the captain/coach role. Over the next decade, Dave would become one of the best performing players in the VSDCA. The left-arm swing bowler and destructive lower order batsmen has taken over 230 wickets and made over 2000 runs. In 2014/15, David was named Captain of the VSDCA 'Team of the Year' and was again selected in the prestigious side in 2016/17.

== Club Premierships ==
First XI	Second XI	Third XI	Fourth XI	Carlton / Brunswick
1914/15	1914/15	1927/28	1973/74	2016/17
1928/29	1922/23	1954/55	1974/75	
1929/30	1923/24	1955/56	1989/90	
1939/40	1924/25	1977/78	1990/91	
1940/41	1941/42	1978/79	1994/95	
1941/42	2018/19	1986/87	1995/96	
1942/43	2023/24	1990/91	2004/05	
1944/45		1993/94	2012/13	
1945/46		1994/95	2017/18	
1975/76		1995/96	2019/20	
1976/77		2009/10	2020/21	
1980/81		2022/23	2022/23	
1982/83		2023/24	2024/25	
1987/88		2024/25		

== First XI Club Records ==
=== Games Played ===
Name	Games	Career
273	SWANSON, John D	1956-57 to 1989-90
249	DOWLING, William J	1909-10 to 1934-35
242	TURNER, Geoffrey R	1971-72 to 1992-93
222	MOLLOY, Steven D	1981-82 to 2010-11
218	McGINTY, Paul A	1976-77 to 1995-96
212	BROWNING, Rodney P	1969-70 to 2000-01

=== Highest Individual Scores ===
Score	Name	Game
271*	RUSSELL, William	Camberwell 1944-45
178	GRANT, Albert	Coburg 1929-30
175	McKENZIE, John J	Hawthorn 1912-13
163	BRADLEY, Colin	Sunshine 1955-56
161*	SWANSON, John D	Kew (Semi-Final) 1982-83

=== Highest Wicket Takers ===
Wickets	Name	Career
672	EXELBY, Murray	1935–1950
551	McGINTY, Paul A	1976–1996
550	CRANSTON, David H	1948–1964
519	CARSON, Walter J	1932–1950
496	McLEAN, Herbert R	1920–1931
