= 1965–66 Victorian district cricket final =

Essendon	Northcote
9d/514	5/516
- Date: 2, 9, 11 & 16 April, 1966
- Venue: Albert Cricket Ground, Melbourne, Victoria

The 1965–66 Victorian district cricket final was a cricket match played over four days from 2 April to 16 April 1966, between the Essendon Cricket Club and the Northcote Cricket Club at the Albert Cricket Ground in Melbourne. The match was staged to determine the premiers of the 1965–66 Victorian district cricket season.

The match, which was decided on first innings lead, was won by Northcote after it successfully chased Essendon's club record first innings score of 9d/514 with five wickets to spare. Northcote captain and Australian Test opener Bill Lawry made 282 not out as part of Northcote's total of 5/516. The match is the most famous in Victorian district cricket history.

== Background ==
The top four clubs in the 1965–66 were Richmond (54 points), Essendon (48 points), Northcote (44 points) and Carlton (40 points), Northcote securing its place only on the last day of the season with a first innings victory against University by two wickets. Two-day semi-finals were played on 19 and 26 March, and with difficult batting conditions on the first day, both grand finalists recorded exciting wins to qualify for the final:

- Essendon 9dec/128 & 5/180 def. Carlton 122 by six runs on the first innings: Essendon had Carlton 3/30 at stumps on day 1 and reduced them to 9/93 early on day 2, before narrowly winning after breaking Carlton's 29-run tenth-wicket partnership.
- Northcote 82 & 2/195 def. Richmond 60 by 22 runs on the first innings: Graeme Patterson took 7/28 to dismiss Northcote for only 82, before 6/4 to Ken Walker in his opening spell reduced Richmond to 6/16 at stumps. Richmond's tail fought to 60 on day 2, Walker finishing with 9/28 missing a ten wicket haul when the final wicket fell to a run out.

Essendon was historically a district cricket minnow, but was enjoying the best period of its history with sustained success throughout the 1960s; it was playing in its third consecutive final and attempting to win its second district premiership, the first coming in 1963–64. Northcote was also a long-time district cricket minnow, and one of the few clubs which didn't have a same-named counterpart in the popular Victorian Football League; it was in its first final since 1923–24, and attempting to win its second premiership, the previous coming in 1912–13; Northcote had finished last in the 1964–65 season.

The sides had faced each other once during the season, Essendon recording a first innings win with a total of 211 against Northcote's 77. Essendon was considered strong favourite to win the final.

== Match summary ==
The match was a timed two-innings match with an original schedule for three days: Saturday 2 April, Saturday 9 April, and Monday 11 April (Easter Monday). In the absence of an outright winner, the premiership would be decided on first innings lead, and the game would be timeless until a first innings result. Hours of play were 12:15pm to 6:00pm, with tea between 3:00pm and 3:15pm. Entry was 40c for adults, 20c for children. There were eight balls per over, the standard in Australian cricket at the time. Per convention, the final was played at the Albert Cricket Ground, home of the Melbourne Cricket Club and generally high-scoring due to its short boundaries and batting-friendly pitches – Essendon captain Ian Monks commented during the game that "400 here is worth 330 on a normal field".

Essendon made one change to its semi-final eleven, Barry Davis returning to the team and Ian Taylor omitted – Taylor had come in for Davis in the semi-final. Northcote named an unchanged eleven.

=== Day 1 (Saturday, 2 April) ===
Essendon won the toss and batted first; Raymond Howe and Ian Monks opened the batting. Howe was dismissed for a duck in the second over caught at short leg. A chance at Monks' wicket was dropped at slip with the score 1/14, and Monks responded with a display of aggressive and dominant batting: he brought up his half-century in less than an hour and his century in 138 minutes with the team score at only 140. Monks was dismissed for 136, the highest score in his twenty-year district career with fourteen fours and a six, caught at silly point with the team score 4/205. Monks had entered the match ill, suffering a cold.

Other than Monks, the Essendon batting was steady but unimpressive: Daryl Foster (31 in 115 minutes) and John Swanson (21 in 49 minutes) supported Monks, while Greg Brown made an erratic 36 in 126 minutes, scoring more from nicks than controlled shots. Essendon increased the scoring rate late in the day, John Grant making 39 in 51 minutes, and at stumps Essendon was 6/311.

Northcote's bowlers were solid but seldom dangerous, with neither pitch nor ball offering support. 17-year-old fast-medium bowler Paul Shanahan was the best performer on the day, taking 3/88, and Mike Mitton bowled well without luck. Walker bowled too much of a legside line with the new ball and failed to take a wicket, and veteran spinner Frank Brew bowled poorly and without a wicket, Monks taking 39 runs from his first six overs.

=== Day 2 (Saturday, 9 April) ===
Resuming at 6/311, Essendon's tail batted very strongly, adding a further 203 runs to Essendon's total over three hours of batting. The four lower order batsman all outscored Essendon's other batsmen except for Monks, with No. 7 Dixie Peters making 64, No. 8 Barry Davis making 60, No. 9 Tom O'Neill making 67, and No. 10 Keith Kirby making 50 not out, and the partnerships for the seventh wicket (80 runs in 80 minutes) and eighth wicket (67 runs in 55 minutes) were both club records for Essendon. Northcote bowled poorly, and Brew, whose bowling was improved from day 1, bowled unchanged.

Essendon scored 9/514, its new club record innings in district cricket, breaking its previous high of 6/425 in 1937–38. Monks declared at tea, just after Kirby's 50. Lawry reportedly told his team "I wouldn't have done that," before encouraging his team with the promise "We’ve taken a long time to get here; if I get half you can get the other half;" many of the Northcote players – including Lawry – later confessed to remembering Lawry's words, but having very little confidence about their chance of chasing.

Lawry and Wayne Robinson opened the batting for Northcote, and batted without loss in an interrupted evening session, which saw rain briefly stop play at 0/45 before bad light stopped play at 5:37pm with the score 0/98. Lawry was not out 53 and Robinson was not out 33.

=== Day 3 (Monday, 11 April) ===
The game resumed two days later on Easter Monday, in bright sunshine. Lawry continued to take the majority of the strike and took the score to 130, before Keith Kirby dismissed Robinson for 41 with his first ball of the day. Gosstray came in at No. 3, and made an uncomfortable 23 from 67 minutes before he was dismissed; and Ian Cowley was dismissed for 5 to reduce Northcote to 3/219. First year player Tom Ryan came in at No. 5.

Shortly after the new ball was taken came the most pivotal over, bowled by John Grant. Lawry, then on 131, edged the first ball to Ken Adams who dropped the tough chance at first slip; on sixth delivery, Lawry was caught behind off a no ball; and on the eighth delivery, he mis-timed a hook shot which barely cleared the slips. They were the last chances Lawry offered, and he hit Grant's next over for 17 runs.

Lawry and Ryan batted for the rest of the day, adding 186 runs in less than three hours, Lawry reached his double century, and passed Gerald Healy's 1919–20 record innings of 230 for a district cricket final. In the final over, the third new ball was taken, and Ryan edged one delivery but was dropped behind by wicketkeeper O'Neill. When play stopped for bad light at 5:32pm, Northcote was 3/405, with Lawry not out 236 and Ryan not out 77.

=== Day 4 (Saturday, 16 April) ===
With several Essendon players rostered to work on the Easter Tuesday bank holiday, the fourth day's play was arranged for Saturday, 16 April. Entry prices were halved for the day. Attendance was variously reported to be between 2,000 and 5,000, an enormous attendance for a district match at the time. Australian Prime Minister Sir Robert Menzies was in attendance.

Ryan was out for 82 to Adams after only eleven minutes, and Frank Brew came in at No. 6. Brew and Lawry took a more aggressive approach than on day 3, Brew putting on a fine display of off-side strokes. Brew and Lawry made a partnership of 94 runs in just over an hour, and took the score from 450 to 500 in only 26 minutes, before Brew was dismissed for 47 fending a rising ball from Grant to Adams at short leg with the score 5/505. Phil Burn made no score as Lawry scored the remaining runs to take Northcote to 5/516, winning the match at 1:50pm.

Lawry finished the match with 282 not out, from 454 balls and 509 minutes. At the time, the score was the second-highest in the district era of VCA cricket, behind only Bill Ponsford's 295 not out in the 1926–27 semi-final; as of 2025, it is third behind Ponsford and Luke Wells (290 in 2019–20). It is the highest score ever in a final. Not one to draw attention to himself, Lawry famously remarked “Essendon had a big score of 514, but Northcote showed what could be done when you all pitch in and make a few,” as well as describing it as one of the biggest thrills of his career.

== Legacy ==
The 1965–66 final is widely known and due to Northcote's underdog victory and the big innings of Bill Lawry. The innings was seen as a highlight of Lawry's most celebrated summers with the Australian team, in which he had scored 592 runs at 84.6 in Tests and 979 runs at 97.9 in all matches against the touring English team.

When he was inducted into the Sport Australia Hall of Fame, Lawry considered this match, alongside his Test debut, to be the highlights of his long domestic and international cricket career.

When asked to vote in 2000, the VCA Umpires Association selected the contest as the District Match of the Century. Northcote regularly hosted reunions and celebrations of the game; Tom Ryan noted that Essendon's players were always invited, but eventually stopped attending, John Grant telling Ryan "It's really nice of you to keep inviting us, but you have to understand: we lost the bloody game!"

== Scorecard ==
Essendon innings
Batsman	Method of dismissal		Runs	Minutes	4s	6s
Raymond Howe	c Walker	b Mitton	0	7	0	0
Ian Monks (c)	c Lawry	b Ryan	136	217	14	1
Daryl Foster		b Shanahan	31	115	3	0
John Swanson	c Morrison	b Shanahan	23	49	3	0
Greg Brown		run out	36	126	3	0
John Grant	c Morrison	b Shanahan	39	54	5	1
Dixie Peters	c Morrison	b Shanahan	64	116	7	0
Barry Davis	c Gosstray	b Walker	61	136	1	1
Tom O'Neill (wk)		b Mitton	67	106	6	0
Keith Kirby	not out		50	69	6	0
Ken Adams	not out		3	18	0	0
Sundries	(b 4, lb 2, w 2, nb 2)		14			
Total	(for 9 wickets declared, 122ov)		514	507		
Fall of wickets: Howe 1/2, Foster 2/124, Swanson 3/165, Monks 4/205, Grant 5/263, Brown 6/283, Peters 7/363, Davis 8/430, O'Neill 9/491

Northcote bowling statistics
Bowler	Overs	Maidens	Runs	Wickets
Kenneth Walker	29	0	95	1
Mike Mitton	21	2	105	2
Frank Brew	25	1	113	0
Paul Shanahan	31	1	143	4
Tom Ryan	12	2	37	1
Bill Lawry	1	0	7	0

Northcote innings
Batsman	Method of dismissal		Runs	Balls	Minutes	4s	6s
Bill Lawry (c)	not out		282	454	509	32	1
Wayne Robinson	lbw	b Kirby	41	153	161	4	0
Bob Gosstray	lbw	b Grant	23	73	67	4	0
Ian Cowley	c Davis	b Adams	5	15	15	0	0
Tom Ryan	c Monks	b Adams	82	229	179	9	0
Frank Brew	c Adams	b Grant	47	56	68	7	0
Phil Burn	not out		0	13	14	0	0
Did not bat: Barry Morrison (wk), Kenneth Walker, Mike Mitton, Paul Shanahan
Extras	(b 15, lb 10, w 5, nb 6)		36				
Total	(for 5 wickets, 122.1ov)		516		509		
Fall of wickets: Robinson 1/130, Gosstray 2/206, Cowley 3/219, Ryan 4/411, Brew 5/505

Northcote bowling statistics
Bowler	Overs	Maidens	Runs	Wickets
John Grant	31	2	134	2
Ken Adams	25	3	105	2
Keith Kirby	35.1	4	135	1
John Swanson	20	5	49	0
Dixie Peters	2	0	14	0
Barry Davis	4	0	22	0
Raymond Howe	5	0	21	0
