= Gillon Oval =

Sports venue in Brunswick, Melbourne, Victoria

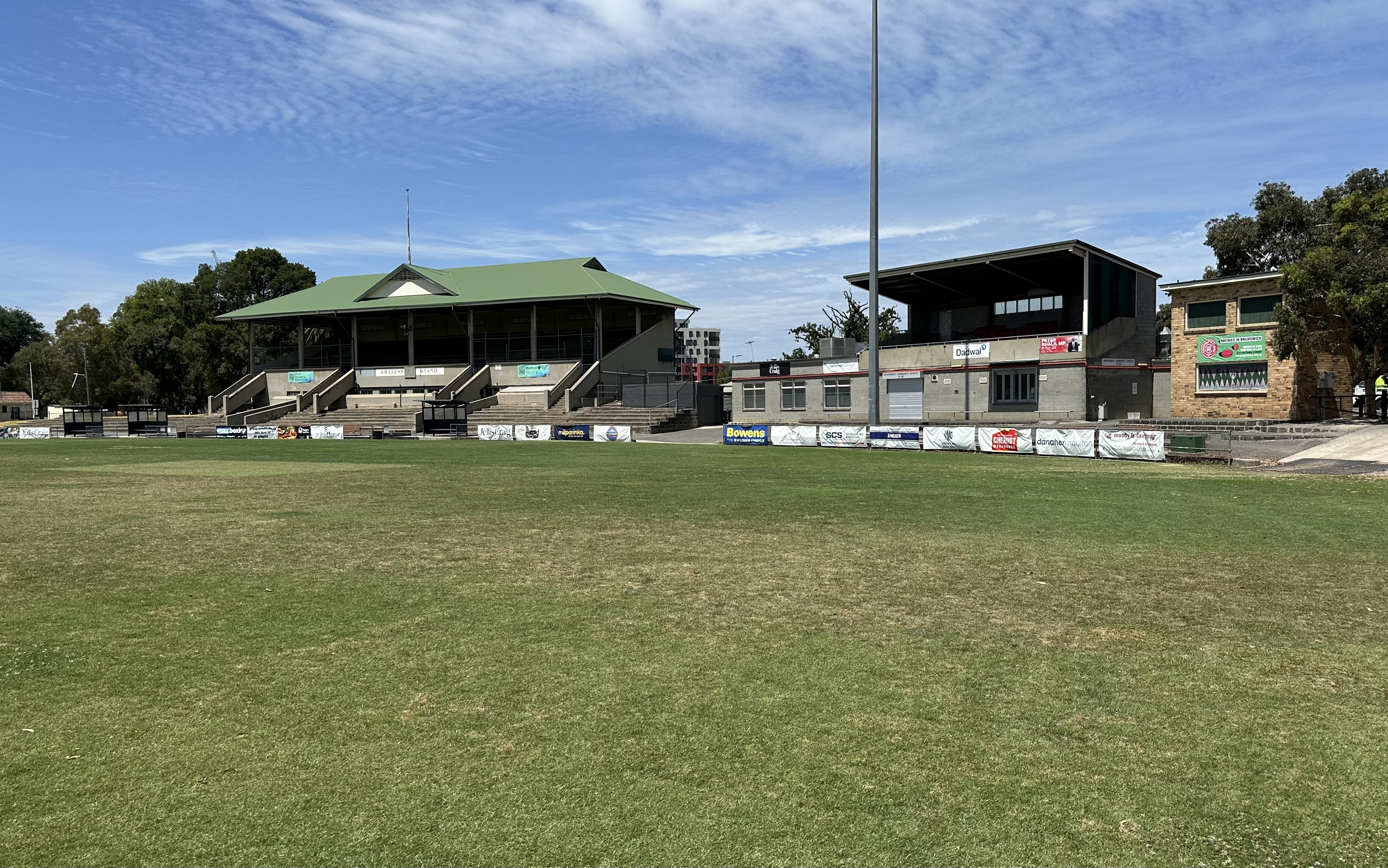
- Gillon Oval in January 2026
- Interactive map of Gillon Oval
- Former names: Brunswick Park
- Address: 133A Hope St; Brunswick, Victoria
- Coordinates: 37.76382°S 144.95129°E
- Operator: City of Merri-bek
- Record attendance: 17,000 (Brunswick vs Coburg, 24 April 1960)
- Field size: 180 m × 145 m (591 ft × 476 ft)

Construction
- Opened: 2 October 1907; 119 years ago

Tenants
- Brunswick Football Club (VAFA); Brunswick Cricket Club (VSDCA)

Gillon Oval (also referred to as the A. G. Gillon Oval or the Alex G. Gillon Oval) is an Australian rules football and cricket venue in the Melbourne suburb of Brunswick. It was established in 1907 as Brunswick Park, which remains the name of the wider public park in which the main oval is located.

The ground was the home of the original Brunswick Football Club in the Victorian Football Association (VFA) and hosted five senior VFA finals matches, including one grand final.

As of 2025, Gillon Oval is home to the modern-day Brunswick Football Club in the Victorian Amateur Football Association (VAFA) and the Brunswick Cricket Club in the Victorian Sub-District Cricket Association (VSDCA).

== History ==
Brunswick Park (sometimes referred to as the Brunswick Football Ground or the Brunswick Cricket Ground) was opened on 2 October 1907 as the home of the original Brunswick Football Club (nicknamed the "Magpies"), which had been playing its matches at Park Street Oval since entering the Victorian Football Association (VFA) in 1897.

On 25 April 1925, Brunswick Park's concrete grandstand (later renamed to the A.R. Glenn Grandstand) was opened. It was constructed at a cost of around £8,500 and described by Brunswick mayor F.T. Wimpney as "second to none" outside of the Melbourne Cricket Ground. The grandstand had a capacity of 2,000 people when it was opened.

The ground hosted the 1928 VFA final between Coburg and Port Melbourne.

Brunswick Park was home to the first VFA premiership match played on a Sunday afternoon, with a record crowd of 17,000 attending a match between Brunswick and Coburg on 24 April 1960.

The original wooden grandstand was destroyed by a deliberately-lit fire on 17 July 1975.

On 18 April 1976, the ground was renamed to Gillon Oval in honour of Alex Gillon (1909–2007), who served as the president of the VFA and the mayor of the City of Brunswick. An electronic scoreboard was introduced for the ground on the same day, making Gillon Oval the second football ground in Melbourne (after VFL Park) to have one.

In 1991, the Magpies (which had been renamed to Brunswick-Broadmeadows in 1990 after a merger with the Broadmeadows Football Club) withdrew from the VFA after round 4 and subsequently folded. VAFA club North Old Boys (later renamed to Brunswick) moved from Brens Oval to Gillon Oval in place of the VFA club.

Gillon Oval hosted a cricket match between Brunswick and the Vanuatu men's national team in January 2025.

Since at least 2014, the A.R. Glenn Grandstand's seating area has been disused and inaccessible to the public. During the 2025 federal election campaign, the Labor Party committed to funding which would restore the grandstand and upgrade the ground's lighting.

== Records ==
=== Australian rules football ===
Record	Total	League	Game
Highest attendance	17,000	VFA Division 1	Brunswick vs Coburg (Round 2, 1960)
Highest finals attendance	13,500	VFA Division 1	Northcote vs Preston (Second semi-final, 1929)
Highest score	37.16 (238)	VFA Division 1	Brunswick vs Oakleigh (Round 19, 1939)
Highest score	46.31 (307)	VFA Division 2	Brunswick vs Sunshine (Round 12, 1983)
Highest score	28.18 (186)	VAFA Division 1 Men's	Banyule vs NOBs/St Pat's (Round 14, 2011)
Highest score	14.19 (103)	VAFA Division 1 Women's	Old Brighton vs Brunswick (Round 14, 2024)
Highest score	20.18 (138)	VWFL Division 4	Brunswick vs Hallam (Round 11, 2015)
