= Kenneth Walker (Australian cricketer) =

Australian cricketer (born 1941)

Personal information
- Born: 25 June 1941 (age 85); Melbourne, Australia

Domestic team information
- Years: Team
- 1962: Victoria
- Source: Cricinfo, 4 December 2015

Kenneth Walker (born 25 June 1941) is an Australian former cricketer. He played one first-class cricket match for Victoria in 1962.

A short-statured left-arm seam bowler, Walker played 92 district cricket matches for Northcote and six for St Kilda, taking 258 career wickets at 20.01. Walker took career best figures of 9/28 in the 1965/66 semi-final against Richmond, helping to dismiss Richmond for only 60 to defend Northcote's meagre first innings total of 82 and qualify for the famous 1965–66 final against Essendon.

== See also ==
- List of Victoria first-class cricketers
