= Roy Gardner =

Roy Gardner may refer to:

- Roy Gardner (bank robber) (1884–1940), American bank robber
- Roy Gardner (businessman) (born 1945), former chairman of Manchester United F.C. (2003–2005), former chairman of Plymouth Argyle F.C.
- Roy Gardner (cricketer) (1914–2004), Australian cricketer
