= Paul Shanahan =

Australian rules footballer

Personal information
- Full name: Paul Gerard Shanahan
- Born: 18 October 1948
- Died: 15 February 2011 (aged 62)
- Original team: Northote (VFA)
- Height: 191 cm (6 ft 3 in)
- Weight: 92 kg (203 lb)

Playing career^{1}
Years	Club	Games (Goals)
1969–1972	Fitzroy	21 (27)
- ^{1} Playing statistics correct to the end of 1972.

Paul Gerard Shanahan (18 October 1948 – 15 February 2011) was an Australian rules footballer who played with Fitzroy in the Victorian Football League (VFL).

Shanahan, a Northcote recruit, played 21 games for Fitzroy, with 12 of his appearances coming in the 1970 VFL season. He left Fitzroy after the 1972 season and played with West Perth, followed by a stint in South Australia playing for West Torrens.

He was also a bowler for the Northcote Cricket Club in district cricket; and, at the age of 17, he played in Northcote's 1st XI premiership winning side in 1965–66, which was captained by Test opener Bill Lawry. He played 20 first XI matches for Northcote between 1965 and 1971, and took 21 wickets at 44.7.
