= John Grant (cricketer) =

Australian cricketer

Personal information
- Full name: John William Grant
- Born: 9 February 1941 (age 85); Essendon, Victoria, Australia
- Nickname: The General
- Batting: Right-handed
- Bowling: Right-arm fast-medium
- Role: All-rounder

Domestic team information
- Years: Team
- 1964–65 to 1968–69: Victoria

Career statistics
Competition	First-class
Matches	43
Runs scored	1172
Batting average	22.53
100s/50s	0/6
Top score	70
Balls bowled	7856
Wickets	110
Bowling average	31.53
5 wickets in innings	4
10 wickets in match	0
Best bowling	6/37
Catches/stumpings	25/–
- Source: CricketArchive, 26 August 2014

John William Grant (born 9 February 1941) is a former Australian cricketer who played first-class cricket for Victoria from 1964–65 to 1968–69.

== Career with Victoria ==
Short and strongly built, John Grant was a bustling opening bowler and hard-hitting lower-order batsman who played 43 matches for Victoria in five seasons. He made his first-class debut in the first match of the 1964–65 season against Western Australia, taking three wickets and, going in to bat when Victoria were 148 for 7 and still trailing, scoring 64 in the second innings to help salvage a draw. A few weeks later, against Queensland, he took 4 for 50 in the first innings and scored 61, again at number nine. He finished the season with 16 wickets at an average of 30.18 and 171 runs at 19.00.

He was less successful in 1965–66, but he did take 5 for 79 and 3 for 57 in Victoria's victory over New South Wales. His most successful season was 1966–67, when he made 252 runs at 31.50 and took 29 wickets at 24.58, and Victoria won the Sheffield Shield. He took 5 for 89 against New South Wales in Melbourne, then in the final match of the season in Sydney, after the first three days had been rained out, he bowled unchanged throughout the New South Wales innings to take 6 for 37 off 17 overs to dismiss New South Wales for 93 and give Victoria an easy run-chase for first-innings points.

He made 292 runs at 26.54 and took 25 wickets at 30.00 in 1967–68. In 1968–69 he took 5 for 25 and 3 for 55 against Queensland, and two weeks later against South Australia he hit his highest score of 70 in a seventh-wicket partnership of 133 with Paul Sheahan that took Victoria to a first-innings lead. He finished the season with 287 runs at 22.07 and 21 wickets at 31.42.

== Other cricket ==
Grant played 191 matches for Essendon in Melbourne district cricket from 1959–60 to 1976–77, playing in two premiership sides and winning the Jack Ryder Medal twice. He was appointed captain-coach for the 1969–70 season and immediately led Essendon to the premiership. He served as a Victorian selector from 1992 to 1998. He has also been a successful coach at The Peninsula School in Mount Eliza.

He had three productive seasons as a professional for Rawtenstall in the Lancashire League. In 1967 he took 95 wickets at an average of 8.41 and made 275 runs at 17.26, and Rawtenstall finished second; in 1968 he took 125 wickets at 9.98 and made 506 runs at 28.23, and Rawtenstall finished second again; and in 1970 he took 89 wickets at 10.49 and made 583 runs at 34.29, and Rawtenstall finished third.

== See also ==
- 1965–66 Victorian district cricket final
