= Frank Brew =

Australian rules footballer (1927–2020)

Personal information
- Full name: Frank Brew
- Born: 19 September 1927
- Died: 13 August 2020 (aged 92)
- Original team: East Brunswick
- Height: 171 cm (5 ft 7 in)
- Weight: 67 kg (148 lb)
- Position: Wing

Playing career^{1}
Years	Club	Games (Goals)
1947–53	South Melbourne	87 (28)
- ^{1} Playing statistics correct to the end of 1953.

Frank Brew (19 September 1927 – 13 August 2020) was an Australian rules footballer who played with South Melbourne in the Victorian Football League (VFL).

== Career ==
Brew trained with Carlton in 1945, and showed some promising form in the early practice matches, before playing in the reserves in 1945 and 1946. He was cleared to South Melbourne in 1947 and spent seven years at the Lakeside Oval and played mainly on the wing. In 1950, Brew finished fourth in the club best and fairest award. In 1951, Brew represented the VFL against the Riverina FL at Narrandera, featuring in the best players. Brew was appointed coach of the Deniliquin Football Club in 1952, but was not cleared by South Melbourne. In February 1953, Brew received a five years of service certificate from the South Melbourne FC. In March 1953, South refused to grant Brew a clearance to captain-coach Port Fairy. Brew was cleared to Brunswick in June 1953. In 1954, Brew led the Finley Football Club to the Murray Football League premiership at Narrandera.

Brew was captain of the Murray Football League team in 1955 during the VCFL Championships.

=== Cricket career ===
Brew played 168 first XI games of district cricket for the Northcote Cricket Club between 1947 and 1970 including the famous 1965–66 Victorian district cricket final.

In 1951, Brew made 110 against North Melbourne in 138 minutes, including 2 sixes and 7 fours. In 1953, Brew made 144 for Northcote in 120 minutes, which included 4 sixes and 13 fours against Carlton. Brew also had a good day with the ball in March 1953 against South Melbourne taking 6/40 off 11 overs with his slow left arm leg spinners.

Brew won Northcote's bowling average in 1951/52.

While playing in the 1956 Melbourne Country Week Cricket Carnival for Murray Valley Cricket Association, Frank Brew made 62 and 75 not out, then took 7/18 and 5/68 against the Rutherglen Cricket Association.

Brew was also the curator of the Princes Park Oval, Carlton from 1970 to 1995.

== Death ==
Brew died from COVID-19 on 13 August 2020, at the age of 92, during the COVID-19 pandemic in Australia.
