= Northcote Park Football Club =

Names
- Full name: Northcote Park Football Club (formerly Prince of Wales FC)
- Nickname: The Cougars

2024 season
- After finals: 7th
- Best and fairest: Jordan Perry

Club details
- Founded: 1945
- Colours: Green, White and Gold
- Competition: Northern Football League
- President: Joe Amad
- Coach: Anthony Palmer
- Captain: Matthew Perry
- Ground: Bill Lawry Oval

Other information
- Official website: northcoteparkfc.com.au

The Northcote Park Football Club, nicknamed the Cougars, is an Australian rules football club, located 6 km north of Melbourne, in the suburb of Northcote, currently playing in Division 2 of the Northern Football League.

The club has been known as Northcote Park since 1952 and play their home matches at Bill Lawry Oval, Northcote. Northcote Park have won a total of 17 premierships (5 as Prince of Wales FC). Their premiership years were 1947 to 1951, 1957, 1977 to 1979, 1985, 1994, 1997, 1999 to 2002, and 2012.

== Original name ==
The club formed as the Prince of Wales Football Club and was affiliated with the Methodist Football Association, playing their home matches at McDonell Park. Between 1947 and 1951, Prince of Wales FC won five consecutive premierships.

== Name change ==
In 1952 the club changed its name to Northcote Park on transferring to the VFA Sub District Football Association. After that competition folded after the 1953 season the club moved to the Metropolitan Football League.

The Cougars won their first premiership in the Metropolitan League in 1957, then transferred to the Panton Hill FL in 1973 where the club won three consecutive premierships from 1977 to 1979.

The search for stronger competition again led the club to move leagues again, this time to the Diamond Valley Football League (DVFL). The League formed a Division Two in 1981 and the club along with fellow new affiliates West Preston, Bundoora and Reservoir and the bottom four clubs from the 1980 DVFL season formed the new Division Two.

Northcote Park's first DVFL premiership was the 1985 Division Two flag and as a result the club was promoted to Division One in 1986, but the Cougars were relegated that same season. In 1994 Northcote Park won their second Division Two premiership and have remained in Division One since.

== Relocation ==
In 1987, Northcote Football Club dropped out of the Victorian Football Association (VFA) and was placed into liquidation, meaning Westgarth St was left without a tenant. Consequently, in 1989, Northcote Park relocated to Westgarth St from McDonell Park.

In 1996, in partnership with the Darebin City Council, the club embarked on a major redevelopment of the ground, which included extending the club rooms and the viewing area, as well as constructing new change rooms and a gymnasium.

With a revamped facility at the premier venue in Northcote, the Cougars started to dominate the DVFL, winning Division One premierships in 1997, 1999, 2000, 2001, 2002 and 2012. The feat of four successive premierships, from 1999 to 2002, has only recently being equalled by Heidelberg from 2006 to 2009.

Improved lighting was installed at Bill Lawry Oval in 2012, making it possible for night footy on Friday or Saturday nights.

The Cougars made a number of mid-table finishes in Division 1 following their premiership success in 2012, and made preliminary finals in 2013 and 2017. However, the COVID-19 Pandemic severely impacted the club and the playing group, resulting in a lack of stability on and off the ground. In the first full season after the pandemic in 2022, the club finished last in Division 1 and was relegated to Division 2.

The club also fields junior teams, formerly known as Alphington Cougars Football Club, and now known as Northcote Junior Football Club. They play in the Yarra Junior Football League. The club also fields several women's netball teams.
