= Keith Kirby =

Australian cricketer (born 1939)

Personal information
- Born: 1 October 1939 (age 87); Melbourne, Australia
- Role: Leg-spinner

Domestic team information
- Years: Team
- 1961–1970: Victoria
- Source: Cricinfo, 4 December 2015

Keith Kirby (born 1 October 1939), a right-arm leg-spinner, is an Australian former cricketer. He played 25 first-class cricket matches for Victoria between 1961 and 1970. Kirby played in Victorian Premier Cricket for Essendon from 1959–60 to 1981–82. In 262 matches he took 623 wickets, still the all-time record for the Bombers, at 19.7.

== See also ==
- List of Victoria first-class cricketers
- 1965–66 Victorian district cricket final
