= Royal Park ovals =

Sporting venues in Parkville, Victoria

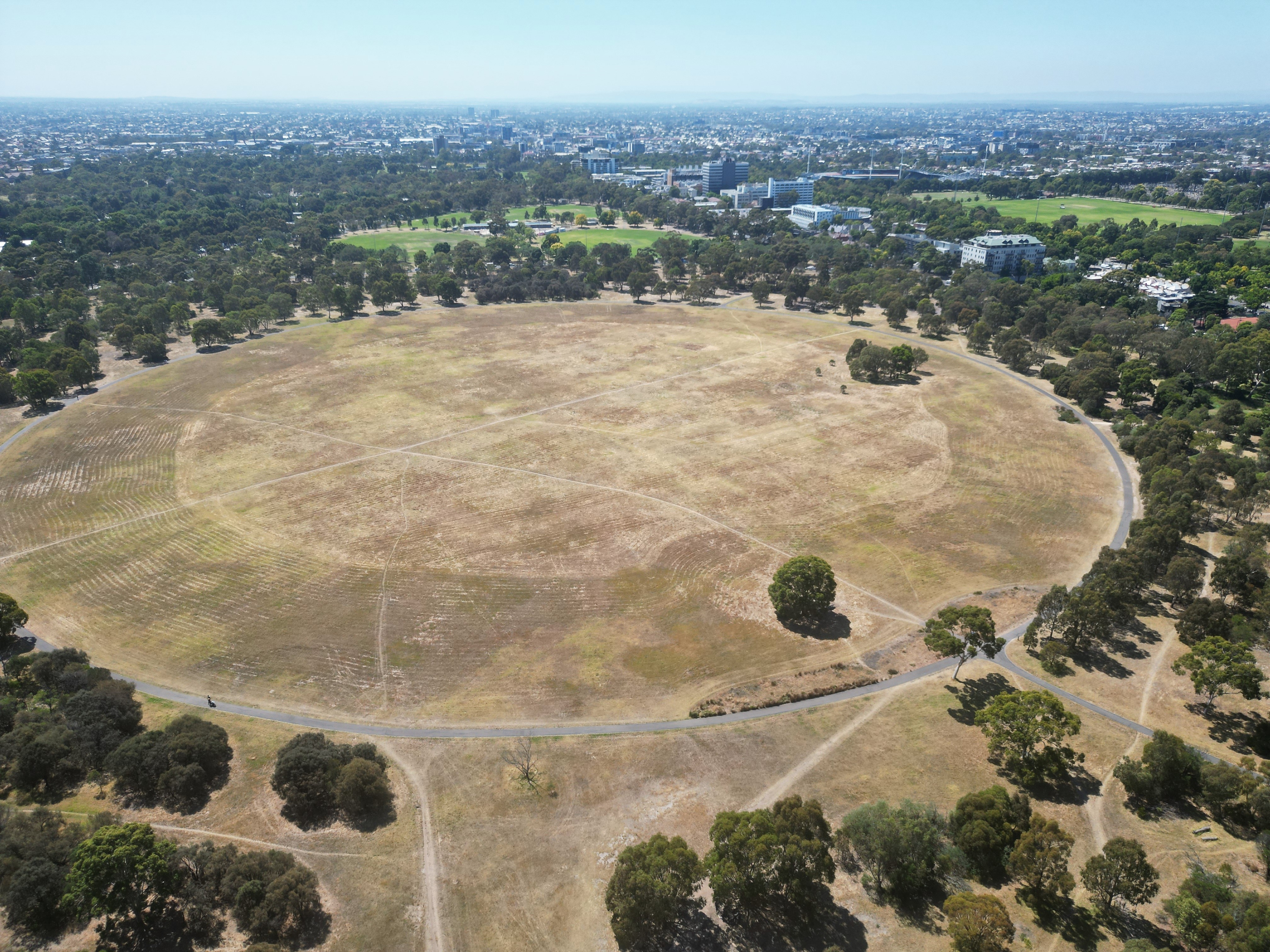
- Interactive map of Royal Park ovals
- Location: Royal Park, Melbourne, Victoria
- Coordinates: 37°47′24.66″S 144°57′4.20″E
- Operator: City of Melbourne

Construction
- Opened: 1854; 172 years ago

The Royal Park ovals are a series of sporting venues located in Royal Park, the largest of Melbourne's inner city parks, in the suburb of Parkville. The ovals are used for Australian rules football, cricket, baseball and rugby league and soccer.

== History ==
Royal Park was identified as a "recreational area" by Victorian governor Charles La Trobe in May 1854. Reports of cricket matches at a Royal Park oval emerged as early as October 1875. The North Melbourne Football Club was formed in 1869 and played its home matches at Royal Park until 1882, when it moved to the Hotham Cricket Ground. The exact location of North Melbourne's home ground is unknown, but it has been described as "within the western boundaries" of the modern-day Melbourne Zoo.

In its earlier years, the site of the three ovals adjacent to Park Street – Western Oval, Ransford Oval and McAlister Oval – was sometimes referred to individually as the Park Street Oval. The Brunswick Football Club (BFC) was formed in 1865 and initially competed in the Victorian Junior Football Association (VJFA) before moving to the Victorian Football Association (VFA) in 1897, continuing to play its home matches at Park Street Oval.

In early 1907, the BFC announced its intention to move to Brunswick Park. It was rumoured that Victorian Football League (VFL) club Carlton was considering moving from Princes Park to Park Street because of strained relations with the Carlton Oval Committee. The Coburg Leader wrote that "it would be a godsend to Brunswick and the local council if the Carlton team were to play on the Park Street Reserve". Carlton ultimately remained at Princes Park, while Park Street hosted its final VFA match on 7 September 1907, which saw Brunswick defeat North Melbourne by 67 points.

During World War II, the South Melbourne Football Club was unable to play its home matches at Lake Oval, forcing it to share Princes Park with Carlton. Because of this, Carlton's reserves team moved to McAlister Oval during the mid-1940s.

Ross Straw Field was constructed at Royal Park as the first purpose-built baseball facility in Victoria. It was intended to be closed for construction of the East West Link, which was approved by the Napthine Liberal–National government in June 2014. The Mercantile Cricket Association planned to move to Poplar Oval because of the loss of two cricket wickets, which would have forced the Royal Park Reds Cricket Club to vacate Poplar Oval. However, after the Labor Party won the November 2014 state election, the project was cancelled and Ross Straw Field remained in use.

47 of the 62 matches during the 2014 Australian Football International Cup were played at Royal Park.

== Tenants ==
Ground	Club	Sport	Ref
Brens Oval	UHS-VU Football Club	Australian rules football	
McAlister Oval	West Brunswick Amateur Football Club	Australian rules football	
McAlister Oval	Brunswick Mudlarks Football Club	Australian rules football	
Poplar Oval	Royal Park Reds Cricket Club	Cricket	
Ransford Oval	West Brunswick Amateur Football Club	Australian rules football	
Ransford Oval	Brunswick Junior Football Club	Australian rules football	
Ransford Oval	Royal Park Brunswick Cricket Club	Cricket	
Ross Straw Field	University of Melbourne Baseball Club	Baseball	
