= Bill Lawry Oval =

Sports venue in Northcote, Victoria

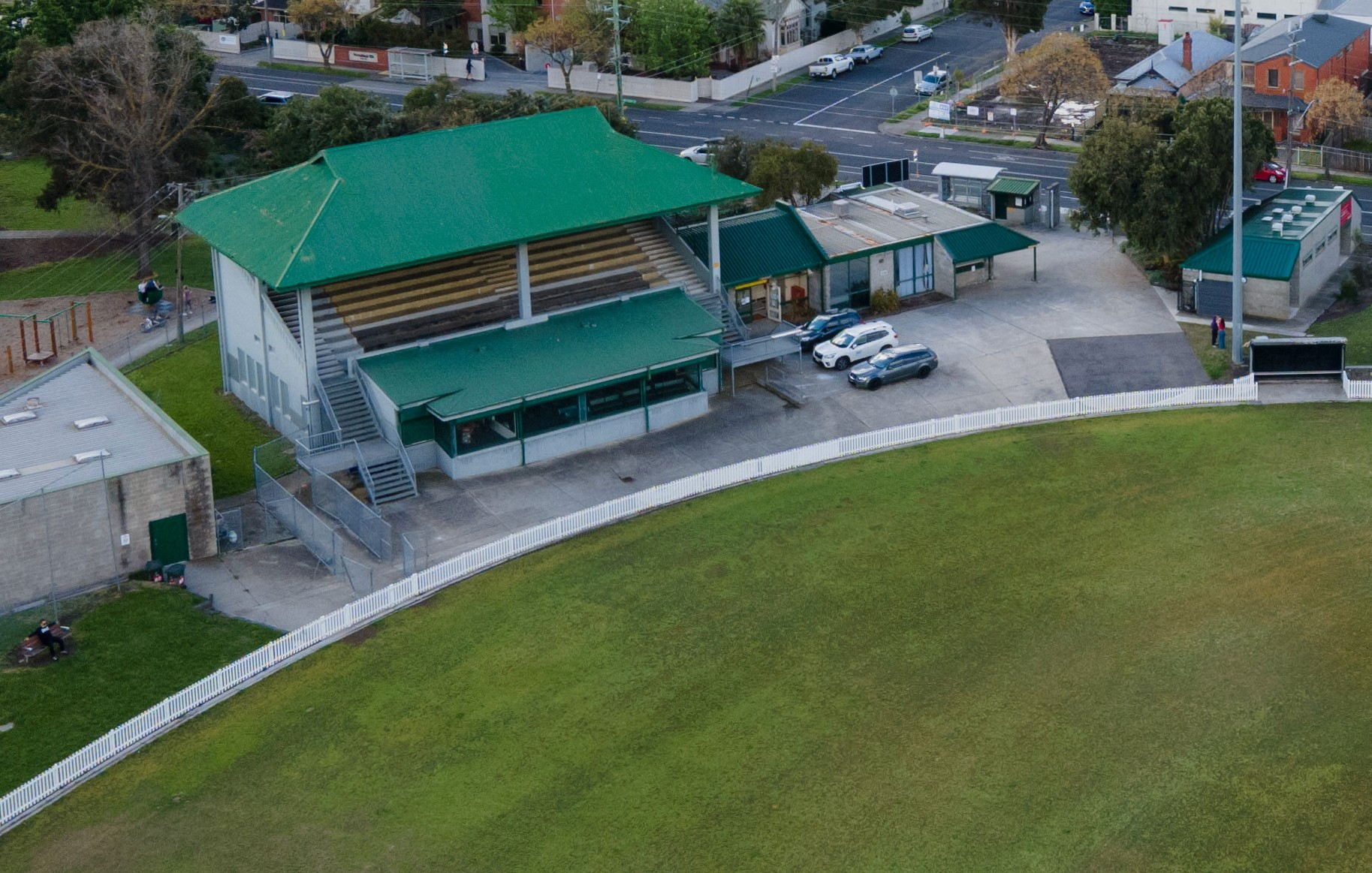
- Interactive map of Bill Lawry Oval
- Address: Westgarth St; Northcote, Victoria
- Coordinates: 37°46′58″S 145°0′17″E
- Owner: City of Darebin
- Capacity: 3,000
- Surface: Grass
- Field size: 160×125m

Construction
- Opened: 1860s; 165 years ago

Tenants
- Northcote Cricket Club (1904–present); Northcote Park Football Club (1989–present)

Bill Lawry Oval (formerly known as Northcote Park and historically referred to as Westgarth Street Oval) is an Australian rules football and cricket venue located in the Melbourne suburb of Northcote. It is the home of the Northcote Park Football Club in the Northern Football Netball League (NFNL) and the Northcote Cricket Club in the Victorian Premier Cricket (VPC) competition.

The venue hosted 641 senior Victorian Football Association (VFA) matches between 1908 and 1987 as the home ground of the Northcote Football Club. From 2016 until the end of 2022, it hosted Darebin Falcons matches in the VFL Women's (VFLW) competition.

== History ==
Northcote Park was established as a public recreation reserve in the 1860s. However, its location near Merri Creek was relatively distant from the main town, meaning it was neither well patronised nor well maintained during the 19th century, and Croxton Park was the town's favoured venue for sports.

After improvements to the ground in the early 1900s, the Northcote Football Club, then playing in the Victorian Junior Football Association, and the Northcote Cricket Club, which was soon a member of the Victorian District Cricket competition both began playing at Northcote Park from 1904. In 1908, the football club (at that stage playing in the Victorian Football Association) returned to Croxton Park from 1909 until 1914; then, returned to Northcote Park in 1915 after the main grandstand was opened. The last of these moves was controversial within the club and resulted in a split of the committee of the Northcote Football Club, after which a splinter group established an entirely new rival club which remained at Croxton Park.

The Northcote Football Club remained at the venue from 1915 until it folded at the end of the 1987 season. The Fitzroy Football Club of the Victorian Football League utilised the venue for training (but not for matches) for a few years after being evicted from the Junction Oval at the end of 1984. In 1989, after Fitzroy had departed and Northcote had folded, the Northcote Park Football Club of the Diamond Valley Football League moved to the venue to become its winter football tenant. The Darebin Falcons began using the venue for its VFLW matches from 2018. The Northcote Cricket Club has remained the venue's primary summer cricket tenant to the present day.

In 2000, the oval was renamed in honour of Victorian and Australian cricket captain Bill Lawry, who played most of his district cricket for Northcote.

== See also ==
- List of sports venues named after individuals
