= 1897 VFA season =

Australian football season

1897 premiership season
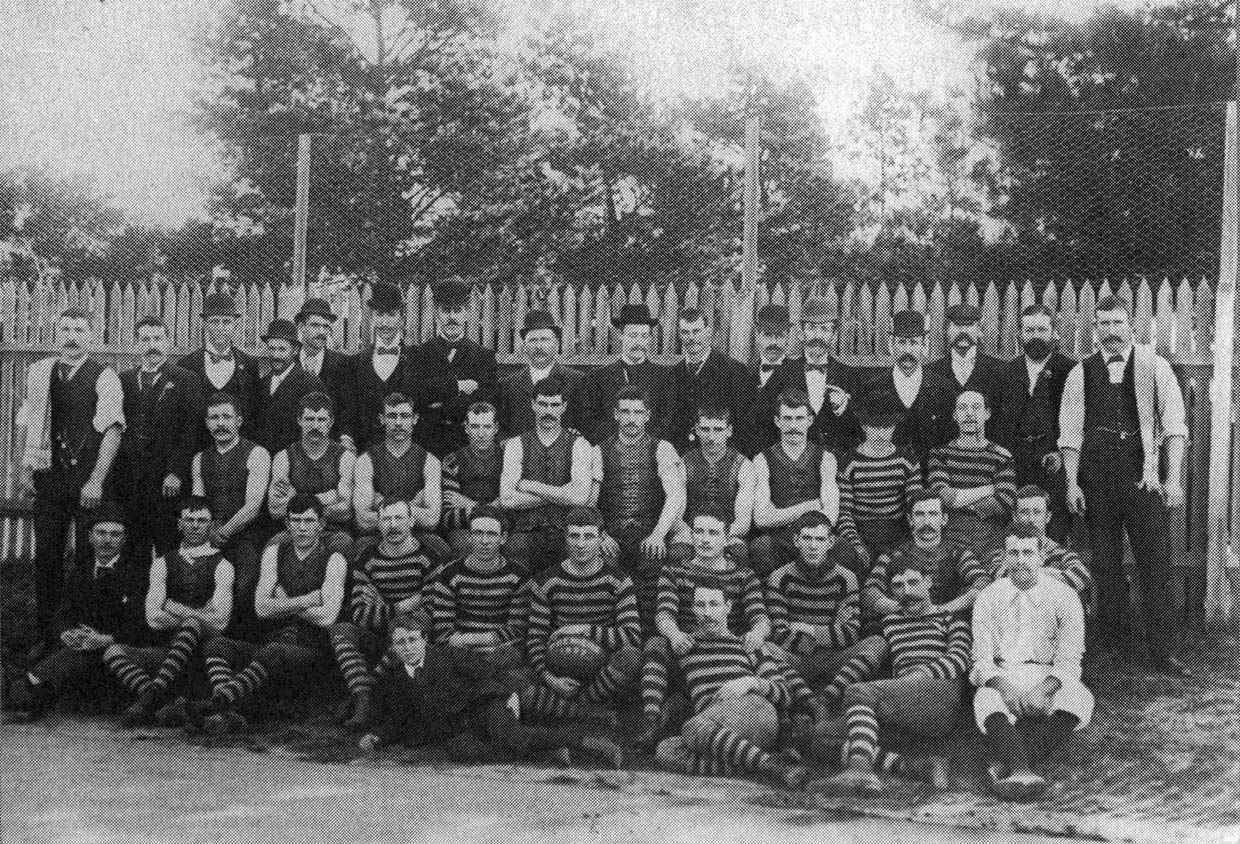
- Port Melbourne, premier team
- Teams: 6
- Premiers: Port Melbourne; 1st premiership

The 1897 Victorian Football Association season was the 21st season of the Australian rules football competition. The premiership was won by the Port Melbourne Football Club, the first premiership in its history.

The 1897 season the VFA's first season as the second-tier senior football competition in Victoria. From 1877 until 1896, the VFA had been the top senior competition in the colony, but at the end of 1896, eight of the association's strongest clubs broke away, establishing the rival Victorian Football League, which immediately assumed the position as the highest level of competition.

== Association membership ==
During the 1890s, there was an off-field power struggle within the VFA between the stronger and weaker clubs, as the stronger clubs sought greater administrative control commensurate with their relative financial contribution to the game. This came to a head during 1896 when it was proposed that gate profits, which were always lower in matches against the weaker clubs, be shared equally amongst the Association clubs; in response to the threat that this could be endorsed on the votes of the weaker clubs, six of the strongest clubs – Collingwood, Essendon, Fitzroy, Geelong, Melbourne and South Melbourne – seceded from the VFA, inviting Carlton and St Kilda to join them, to form a rival senior competition, the Victorian Football League. The League became recognised as the highest level of senior competition in the colony of Victoria, and the Association became the second-tier senior competition, a position it has maintained since.

The establishment of the League left only five of the Association's existing senior competing clubs: Footscray, North Melbourne, Port Melbourne, Richmond and Williamstown. The VFL gave those five clubs the opportunity to compete as a junior competition under and without representation on the VFL's administration, but they rejected the offer and continued as an independent body. One junior club, Brunswick, was elevated to senior status to bring the numbers to six. The Argus reported in March that two other junior clubs would be elevated to bring numbers to eight, with Essendon District, Brighton, Hawksburn, Hawthorn or Geelong all cited as potential candidates, but this did not eventuate and the association size remained at six teams until 1899.

The three Ballarat-based clubs – Ballarat, Ballarat Imperial and South Ballarat – had been members of the Association with representation on the Board of Management, but had not actively competed for the Association premiership. As there was no longer a strong administrative benefit to belonging to the weakened Association, those clubs also ended their affiliations prior to 1897.

A committee set up in 1896 prior to the secession, featuring delegates both from teams which did secede and teams which did not, developed a series of rule changes which were implemented in 1897: however, since the rules were not adopted until after the secession, the two bodies elected to adopt some slightly different rule changes. Key changes were:

- The modern system of scoring was introduced, with six points awarded for a goal and one point for a behind, replacing the system where games were decided solely on the number of goals scored. (Adopted by both bodies)
- The "little mark" was abolished, with the minimum length required for a kick to be claimed as a mark increased from two yards to ten yards (Adopted by both bodies)
- The number of players in a team was reduced from twenty to eighteen, with two follower positions eliminated. (Later adopted by the League in 1899)

== Season results ==
=== Round 1 ===
	Round 1
Saturday, 1 May	Port Melbourne 8.19 (67)	def.	North Melbourne 2.6 (18)	Port Melbourne Cricket Ground
Saturday, 1 May	Williamstown 3.4 (22)	def. by	Footscray 4.5 (29)	Williamstown Cricket Ground
Saturday, 1 May	Richmond 5.8 (38)	def.	Brunswick 2.3 (15)	Melbourne Cricket Ground

=== Round 2 ===
	Round 2
Saturday, 8 May	Port Melbourne 10.12 (72)	def.	Richmond 3.5 (23)	Port Melbourne Cricket Ground
Saturday, 8 May	Footscray 6.12 (48)	def.	Brunswick 3.4 (22)	Western Reserve
Saturday, 8 May	Williamstown 4.6 (30)	def. by	North Melbourne 4.9 (33)	Williamstown Cricket Ground

=== Round 3 ===
	Round 3
Saturday, 15 May	Williamstown 2.3 (15)	def. by	Port Melbourne 4.8 (32)	Williamstown Cricket Ground
Saturday, 15 May	Richmond 5.10 (40)	def. by	Footscray 10.13 (73)	Richmond City Reserve
Saturday, 15 May	Brunswick 3.3 (21)	def.	North Melbourne 1.10 (16)	Park Street Oval

=== Round 4 ===
	Round 4
Saturday, 22 May	Port Melbourne 17.18 (120)	def.	Brunswick 2.0 (12)	Port Melbourne Cricket Ground
Saturday, 22 May	North Melbourne 8.7 (55)	def. by	Footscray 9.8 (62)	East Melbourne Cricket Ground
Saturday, 22 May	Richmond 7.10 (52)	drew with	Williamstown 8.4 (52)	Richmond City Reserve

=== Round 5 ===
	Round 5
Monday, 24 May (morning)	Footscray 2.5 (17)	def. by	Port Melbourne 7.9 (51)	Western Reserve
Monday, 24 May (morning)	North Melbourne 5.13 (43)	def.	Richmond 6.6 (42)	East Melbourne Cricket Ground
Monday, 24 May (morning)	Williamstown 9.16 (70)	def.	Brunswick 4.2 (26)	Williamstown Cricket Ground

=== Round 6 ===
	Round 6
Saturday, 29 May	North Melbourne 6.5 (41)	def.	Port Melbourne 2.5 (17)	East Melbourne Cricket Ground
Saturday, 29 May	Footscray 2.10 (22)	def.	Williamstown 0.4 (4)	Western Reserve
Saturday, 29 May	Brunswick 8.6 (54)	def.	Richmond 4.15 (39)	Park Street Oval

=== Round 7 ===
	Round 7
Saturday, 5 June	Richmond 8.1 (49)	def. by	Port Melbourne 8.12 (60)	Richmond Cricket Ground
Saturday, 5 June	North Melbourne 5.8 (38)	def.	Williamstown 3.5 (23)	East Melbourne Cricket Ground
Saturday, 5 June	Brunswick 4.2 (26)	def. by	Footscray 8.8 (56)	Park Street Oval

=== Round 8 ===
	Round 8
Saturday, 12 June	Port Melbourne 4.10 (34)	def.	Williamstown 4.5 (29)	Port Melbourne Cricket Ground
Saturday, 12 June	Footscray 8.13 (61)	def.	Richmond 6.8 (44)	Western Reserve
Saturday, 12 June	Brunswick 2.9 (21)	def. by	North Melbourne 8.9 (57)	Park Street Oval

=== Round 9 ===
	Round 9 (Charity Round)
Saturday, 19 June	North Melbourne 3.12 (30)	def.	Footscray 2.4 (16)	East Melbourne Cricket Ground
Saturday, 19 June	Brunswick 1.1 (7)	def. by	Port Melbourne 6.9 (45)	Park Street Oval
Saturday, 19 June	Williamstown 8.15 (63)	def.	Richmond 3.3 (21)	Williamstown Cricket Ground

=== Round 10 ===
	Round 10
Saturday, 26 June	Port Melbourne 3.11 (29)	def.	North Melbourne 3.6 (24)	Port Melbourne Cricket Ground
Saturday, 26 June	Brunswick 0.1 (1)	def. by	Williamstown 6.9 (45)	Park Street Oval
Saturday, 26 June	Richmond 2.2 (14)	def. by	North Melbourne 7.8 (50)	Richmond Cricket Ground

=== Round 11 ===
	Round 11
Saturday, 3 July	North Melbourne 3.10 (28)	def. by	Port Melbourne 7.4 (46)	East Melbourne Cricket Ground
Saturday, 3 July	Williamstown 3.5 (23)	def.	Footscray 2.9 (21)	Williamstown Cricket Ground
Saturday, 3 July	Brunswick 6.8 (44)	def.	Richmond 4.8 (32)	Park Street Oval

=== Round 12 ===
	Round 12
Saturday, 10 July	Richmond 3.6 (24)	def. by	Port Melbourne 5.6 (36)	Richmond Cricket Ground
Saturday, 10 July	North Melbourne 5.2 (32)	def.	Williamstown 4.7 (31)	East Melbourne Cricket Ground
Saturday, 10 July	Brunswick 3.8 (26)	def. by	Footscray 10.13 (73)	Park Street Oval

=== Round 13 ===
	Round 13
Saturday, 17 July	Port Melbourne 9.14 (68)	def.	Williamstown 2.4 (16)	Port Melbourne Cricket Ground
Saturday, 17 July	Footscray 7.17 (59)	def.	Richmond 0.5 (5)	Western Reserve
Saturday, 17 July	Brunswick 3.7 (25)	def. by	North Melbourne 5.7 (37)	Park Street Oval

=== Round 14 ===
	Round 14
Saturday, 24 July	Brunswick 6.8 (44)	def. by	Port Melbourne 14.15 (99)	Park Street Oval
Saturday, 24 July	Footscray 4.4 (28)	def.	North Melbourne 1.4 (10)	Western Reserve
Saturday, 24 July	Williamstown 9.15 (69)	def.	Richmond 5.3 (33)	Williamstown Cricket Ground

=== Round 15 ===
	Round 15
Saturday, 7 August	Port Melbourne 1.11 (17)	def.	Footscray 1.8 (14)	Port Melbourne Cricket Ground
Saturday, 7 August	North Melbourne 9.14 (68)	def.	Richmond 5.14 (44)	East Melbourne Cricket Ground
Saturday, 7 August	Williamstown 9.12 (66)	def.	Brunswick 2.8 (20)	Williamstown Cricket Ground

=== Round 16 ===
	Round 16
Saturday, 14 August	Port Melbourne 2.11 (23)	def. by	North Melbourne 4.5 (29)	Port Melbourne Cricket Ground
Saturday, 14 August	Footscray 3.6 (24)	def. by	Williamstown 3.7 (25)	Western Reserve
Saturday, 14 August	Richmond 5.21 (51)	def.	Brunswick 5.4 (34)	Richmond Cricket Ground

=== Round 17 ===
	Round 17
Saturday, 21 August	Port Melbourne 13.8 (86)	def.	Richmond 3.3 (21)	Port Melbourne Cricket Ground
Saturday, 21 August	Williamstown 9.7 (61)	def.	North Melbourne 2.5 (17)	Williamstown Cricket Ground
Saturday, 21 August	Footscray 3.10 (28)	def.	Brunswick 2.8 (20)	Western Reserve

=== Round 18 ===
	Round 18
Saturday, 28 August	Williamstown 3.9 (27)	def. by	Port Melbourne 4.6 (30)	Williamstown Cricket Ground
Saturday, 28 August	Richmond 5.10 (40)	def. by	Footscray 9.12 (66)	Richmond Cricket Ground
Saturday, 28 August	North Melbourne 10.9 (69)	def.	Brunswick 3.15 (33)	Western Reserve

=== Round 19 ===
	Round 19
Saturday, 4 September	Port Melbourne 9.17 (71)	def.	Brunswick 2.6 (18)	Port Melbourne Cricket Ground
Saturday, 4 September	Footscray 4.6 (30)	def. by	North Melbourne 7.5 (47)	Western Reserve
Saturday, 4 September	Richmond 3.11 (29)	def. by	Williamstown 4.9 (33)	Richmond Cricket Ground

=== Round 20 ===
	Round 20
Saturday, 11 September	Footscray 7.12 (54)	def.	Port Melbourne 3.6 (24)	Western Reserve
Saturday, 11 September	Richmond 6.8 (44)	def. by	North Melbourne 6.16 (52)	Richmond Cricket Ground
Saturday, 11 September	Williamstown 13.15 (93)	def.	Brunswick 6.7 (43)	Williamstown Cricket Ground

== Ladder ==
1897 VFA ladder
Pos	Team	Pld	W	L	D	PF	PA	Pts
1	Port Melbourne (P)	20	17	3	0	1080	504	68
2	North Melbourne	20	14	6	0	770	681	56
3	Footscray	20	13	7	0	805	559	52
4	Williamstown	20	10	9	1	795	606	42
5	Brunswick	20	3	17	0	505	1111	12
6	Richmond	20	2	17	1	685	1091	10

(P) Premiers

== Notable events ==
=== Representative games ===
The Association played one representative match during 1897, against the Ballarat Football Association at the Eastern Oval on 31 July.

	Representative Games in 1897
Saturday, 31 July	B.F.A. 6.11 (47)	def. by	V.F.A. 7.8 (50)	Eastern Oval

=== Other notable events ===
- Theodore Fink, MLA replaced Sir Frank Grey Smith as president of the Association. Smith had been president since 1887.
- Owing to work to upgrade the venue, the North Melbourne Recreation Reserve was not available during the season. North Melbourne played most of its home games for the season at the East Melbourne Cricket Ground, sharing it with the League's Essendon Football Club; it also played one home game at Footscray when East Melbourne was unavailable.
- In Round 12, only nine of the Footscray team arrived for their match against Brunswick; Footscray was forced to call on trainers, reserves and about half a dozen willing spectators to take the field in order to field a full team. Despite this unusual handicap, Footscray still comfortably won the game.
- The Association introduced premiership medals to be award to players of the premier club for the first time, replacing the existing practice of awarding a premiership cap to each player.

== See also ==
- Victorian Football League (1897–1989)
- List of VFA premiers
- History of Australian rules football in Victoria (1853–1900)
