= Barry Davis (footballer) =

Australian rules footballer (1943–2024)

Personal information
- Born: 15 September 1943
- Died: 22 May 2024 (aged 80)
- Original team: Essendon High School
- Height: 185 cm (6 ft 1 in)
- Weight: 87 kg (192 lb)

Playing career^{1}
Years	Club	Games (Goals)
1961–1972	Essendon	218 (65)
1973–1975	North Melbourne	71 (54)
Total		289 (119)

Coaching career
Years	Club	Games (W–L–D)
1978 – 1980	Essendon	67 (30–36–1)
- ^{1} Playing statistics correct to the end of 1980.

Career highlights
- 3× Premierships: 1962, 1965, 1975; Champions of Essendon (15th); Essendon Team of the Century (half-back flank); North Melbourne Team of the Century (interchange)

Barry Davis (15 September 1943 – 22 May 2024) was an Australian rules footballer who played in the Victorian Football League (VFL) with Essendon and North Melbourne, before coaching his original team between 1978 and 1980. He was a three-time premiership player.

== Playing career ==
=== Essendon Football Club ===
In the summer of 1961, Barry Davis and a school friend were asked to train with Essendon in a bid to play in the Under-19s. Davis impressed observers and he was asked to participate in pre-season practice matches that included players from the main list. He played in the Reserves for round 1 of the 1961 season. Recruited from Essendon High School, Davis made his debut with Essendon Football Club in the VFL in the second round of 1961; Davis played off the half-back line and was quite a prolific ball-gathering player. Davis never played with the under-19s even though he was eligible.

Davis went on to play 218 games and kick 65 goals for the club, winning the Bombers' best and fairest award three times – in 1968, 1969 and 1971. He captained the side in 1970 and 1971, and he also played in the team premierships in 1962 and 1965. He was named in Essendon's official 'Team of the Twentieth Century'.

=== North Melbourne Football Club ===
Moving to North in 1973 under the VFL's short-lived "10-year rule", which allowed players with ten years' service at one club to move to another club without a clearance, Davis won North Melbourne's best and fairest in his first year at North. He went on to captain the Roos' first-ever premiership side in 1975, his final VFL season. He had played 71 games and kicked 54 goals for North before retiring. He was also named in North Melbourne's Team of the Century.

== Coaching career ==
=== Essendon Football Club ===
Davis coached his original club Essendon as senior coach from 1978 to 1980; he replaced Bill Stephen, who was sacked as Essendon Football Club senior coach at the end of the 1977 season. Davis coached Essendon with a 30-win, 36-loss and 1-draw record. He resigned at the end of the 1980 season because Essendon under Davis did not make the top five on the ladder and therefore missed out of the finals. He then made way for Kevin Sheedy, who replaced Davis as Essendon Football Club senior coach and coached the club until the end of the 2007 season, for a record total of 27 years.

== Champions of Essendon ==
In 2002, an Essendon panel ranked him at 15 in their Champions of Essendon list of the 25 greatest players ever to have played for Essendon.

== Death ==
Davis died on 22 May 2024, at the age of 80.

== Statistics ==
Legend
G	Goals	K	Kicks	D	Disposals	T	Tackles
B	Behinds	H	Handballs	M	Marks
#	Played in that season's premiership team

Led the league after finals only

Season	Team	No.	Games	Totals							Averages (per game)						
Season	Team	No.	Games	G	B	K	H	D	M	T	G	B	K	H	D	M	T
1961	Essendon	32	17	14	—N/a	—N/a	—N/a	—N/a	—N/a	—N/a	0.8	—N/a	—N/a	—N/a	—N/a	—N/a	—N/a
1962^{#}	Essendon	32	17	0	—N/a	—N/a	—N/a	—N/a	—N/a	—N/a	0	—N/a	—N/a	—N/a	—N/a	—N/a	—N/a
1963	Essendon	32	18	1	—N/a	—N/a	—N/a	—N/a	—N/a	—N/a	0.1	—N/a	—N/a	—N/a	—N/a	—N/a	—N/a
1964	Essendon	32	16	0	—N/a	—N/a	—N/a	—N/a	—N/a	—N/a	0.0	—N/a	—N/a	—N/a	—N/a	—N/a	—N/a
1965^{#}	Essendon	32	12	0	0	126	23	149	61	—N/a	0.0	0.0	10.5	1.9	12.4	5.1	—N/a
1966	Essendon	32	20	1	2	275	30	305	82	—N/a	0.1	0.1	13.8	1.5	15.3	4.1	—N/a
1967	Essendon	32	17	0	0	292	32	324	72	—N/a	0.0	0.0	17.2	1.9	19.1	4.2	—N/a
1968	Essendon	32	22	1	8	394	87	481	136	—N/a	0.0	0.4	17.9	4.0	21.9	6.2	—N/a
1969	Essendon	32	19	18	18	446	90	536	134	—N/a	0.9	0.9	23.5	4.7	28.2	7.1	—N/a
1970	Essendon	32	19	17	23	382	85	467	101	—N/a	0.9	1.2	20.1	4.5	24.6	5.3	—N/a
1971	Essendon	32	19	11	23	400	62	462	132	—N/a	0.6	1.2	21.1	3.3	24.3	6.9	—N/a
1972	Essendon	32	22	2	2	376	34	410	106	—N/a	0.1	0.1	17.1	1.5	18.6	4.8	—N/a
1973	North Melbourne	32	21	19	19	466	67	533	89	—N/a	0.9	0.9	22.2	3.2	25.4	4.2	—N/a
1974	North Melbourne	32	24	21	16	461	92	553	113	—N/a	0.9	0.7	19.2	3.8	23.0	4.7	—N/a
1975^{#}	North Melbourne	32	26	14	12	503	106	609	102	—N/a	0.5	0.5	20.1	4.2	24.4	4.1	—N/a
Career			289	119	123	4121	708	4829	1128	—N/a	0.4	0.6	18.7	3.2	22.0	5.1	—N/a

== See also ==
- 1965–66 Victorian district cricket final
