= Ian Cowley =

Australian cricketer

Personal information
- Born: 20 March 1937 (age 89); Launceston, Tasmania, Australia

Domestic team information
- Years: Team
- 1960-1964: Tasmania
- Source: Cricinfo, 13 March 2016

Ian Cowley (born 20 March 1937) is an Australian former cricketer. He played four first-class matches for Tasmania between 1960 and 1964.

== See also ==
- List of Tasmanian representative cricketers
- 1965–66 Victorian district cricket final
