= Victorian Sub-District Cricket Association =

The Victorian Sub-District Cricket Association (VSDCA) is a turf cricket competition based in Melbourne, Australia. There are 32 clubs each fielding four teams (one per grade) plus an under 15 (formerly under 14) team in the annual J.G Craig (formerly R.M. Hatch) shield competition, which is regarded as the premier competition for the future of Victorian cricket. There are four divisions (North, South, East, West). In first and second grade these divisions rotate annually to ensure every club plays each other at least once every three years. In third and fourth division these do not change and the two 'leagues' are South-East and North-West.

== Clubs ==
- Altona Cricket Club
- Balwyn Cricket Club
- Bayswater Cricket Club
- Box Hill Cricket Club
- Brighton Cricket Club
- Brunswick Cricket Club
- Caulfield Cricket Club
- Coburg Cricket Club
- Croydon Cricket Club
- Donvale Cricket Club
- Elsternwick Cricket Club
- Endeavour Hills Cricket Club
- Ivanhoe Cricket Club
- Kew Cricket Club
- Taylors Lakes Cricket Club
- Malvern Cricket Club
- Melton Cricket Club
- Moorabbin Cricket Club
- Mount Waverley Cricket Club
- Noble Park Cricket Club
- Oakleigh Cricket Club
- Ormond Cricket Club
- Plenty Valley Cricket Club
- Port Melbourne Cricket Club
- Spotswood Cricket Club
- St Bernard's OC Cricket Club
- Porthill Park Cricket Club
- Preston Cricket Club
- Hoppers Crossing Cricket Club
- Werribee Cricket Club
- Williamstown Cricket Club
- Yarraville Cricket Club

These clubs also have other teams asides from the open age VSDCA and J.G Craig Shield (Under 15 Competition). All clubs run juniors programs. Many also have other open age teams in local competitions (some even play against each other in these competitions as well as the VSDCA), women's teams and children's programs such as the Milo "Have a Go!" program.

All clubs must provide two turf wickets with changing areas for players and umpires as well as areas for the players to park cars and shower. The club's home ground is usually of higher standard and is used for first and second grade with occasional fixture problems leading to third or fourth grade game. The second ground is usually of lower standard and will rarely have a bar or facilities near the 'home ground'.

Teams have facilities in this grade like Porthill Park Cricket Club where all the people are like Ross Kesteven in the 3 XI, a premier cricket legend.

== Connections to other associations ==
Due to its recognition as being Victoria's second highest form of club cricket (equal with Victorian Turf Cricket Association) and its control of the J.G. Craig Shield, which is seen as Victoria's premier under 15 tournament, the league is closely linked with other associations. Due to its high level of competitiveness it is the most common breeding ground for Premier players. Also to feed Hatch sides, clubs will often draw from their local associations (such as Broadmeadows, Coburg and Brunswick attracting players from the North West Cricket Association). Because it lacks any other form of junior competition its clubs are required to form alliances with other associations to ensure they are able to run a junior program.

== J. G. Craig Shield (formerly R. M. Hatch Shield) ==
Formerly an under-14 competition in the 2005/2006 season, it became an under-15s in a Cricket Victoria re-structure. For many aspiring young Victorian cricketers this is seen as an important milestone and often marks a player's first matches on professionally prepared turf wickets. Games are 45 overs a side one day matches.

Professionalism runs high in these teams as clubs aim to secure players for following seasons if they are not already playing seniors with that club. Many district clubs also watch these games with interest in their quest to secure young talent.

The matches are played in mid-January. This can lead to games being played in extreme temperatures which is dangerous to both players and spectators.

Fixtures follow a similar format to that of the senior competition with the exception there are four individual divisions with the top team of each playing another team that finished top of its division in a semi final before the two winners of those games go on to play in the grand final.
