= Greg Brown (Australian rules footballer) =

Australian rules footballer

Personal information
- Born: 26 February 1943 (age 83)
- Original team: Essendon Grammar
- Height: 183 cm (6 ft 0 in)
- Weight: 83 kg (183 lb)

Playing career^{1}
Years	Club	Games (Goals)
1963–1969	Essendon	83 (4)
- ^{1} Playing statistics correct to the end of 1969.

Greg Brown (born 26 February 1943) is a former Australian rules footballer who played with Essendon in the VFL during the 1960s.

Brown was recruited to Essendon locally and he made his debut for the seniors in 1963. He played as a defender, usually at full-back and it was at that position that he was a member of Essendon's 1965 premiership side. After a good season in 1967 where he finished second in his club's Best and fairest, injuries got the better of him and by 1969 he was playing most of his football in the reserves. He finished runner up in another award, the Gardiner Medal, that year and retired from the VFL at the end of the season to finish his career at the Waverley Football Club.

After retirement he still remained involved in football as both a commentator and Essendon administrator.

== See also ==
- 1965–66 Victorian district cricket final
