= Gerald Healy =

Australian cricketer

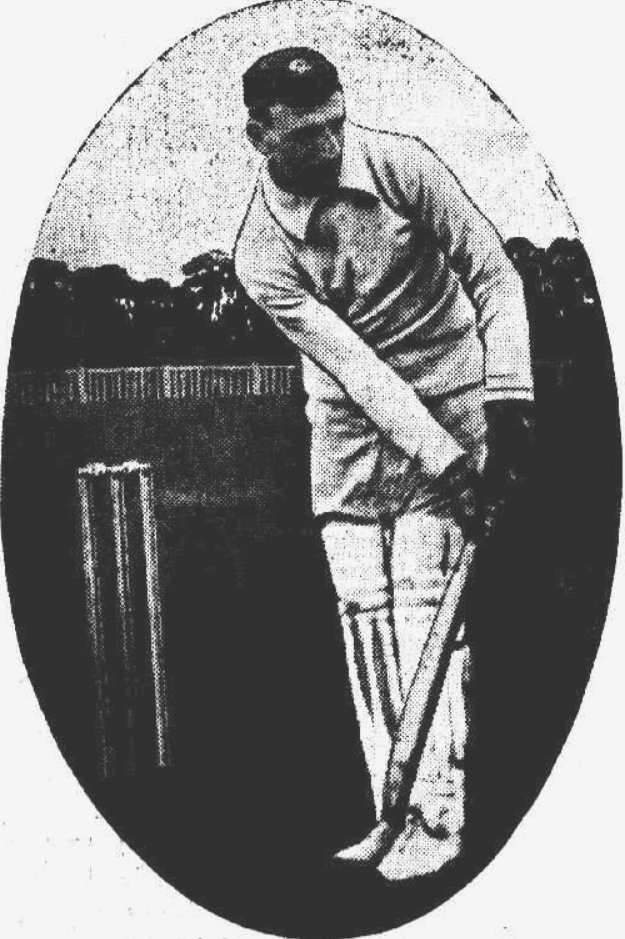

Personal information
- Born: 26 March 1885; Melbourne, Australia
- Died: 12 July 1946 (aged 61); Melbourne, Australia

Domestic team information
- Years: Team
- 1908-1915: Victoria
- Source: Cricinfo, 15 November 2015

Gerald Healy (26 March 1885 – 12 July 1946) was an Australian cricketer. He played six first-class cricket matches for Victoria between 1908 and 1915.

== See also ==
- List of Victoria first-class cricketers
