= Daryl Foster =

Daryl Hugh Foster OAM (born 9 December 1938) is an Australian cricket coach.

== Cricket ==
=== Playing career ===
Foster played in Victorian grade cricket between 1955 and 1971 for Essendon, University and Northcote. He played two second XI matches for Victoria in 1955 and 1956.

=== Coaching career ===
Foster coached Western Australia to nine Sheffield Shield wins in two stints between 1975 and 1995. He was replaced for the 1992-93 season by Terry Alderman but returned to the job for the 1993-94 season.

Between 1991 and 1997 Foster was coach of English county team Kent.

In 1987 Foster was involved with the founding of the MRF Pace Foundation.

Since 2002 he has been involved with the Dennis Lillee Fast Bowling Academy in Perth, Western Australia.

=== Throwing ===
As a human movement lecturer at the University of Western Australia, Foster was regularly involved in tests to prove whether bowlers threw deliveries beyond ICC guidelines. He was involved in testing Sri Lankan bowler Muttiah Muralitharan's bowling action in 1995, 1999 and 2004. He was also involved in analysing Pakistani bowler Shoaib Akhtar's action in 2001.

== Honours ==
In 1991 Foster was awarded the Medal of the Order of Australia for service to cricket.

== See also ==
- 1965–66 Victorian district cricket final
