= John Swanson (cricketer) =

Australian cricketer (born 1940)

Personal information
- Full name: John David Swanson
- Born: 5 May 1940 (age 86); Melbourne, Victoria, Australia
- Batting: Left-handed
- Bowling: Slow left-arm orthodox

Domestic team information
- Years: Team
- 1965/66–1970/71: Victoria

Career statistics
Competition	FC	List A
Matches	29	4
Runs scored	1,139	31
Batting average	31.63	10.33
100s/50s	1/7	0/0
Top score	156	14
Balls bowled	–	184
Wickets	36	4
Bowling average	35.63	21.25
5 wickets in innings	1	0
10 wickets in match	0	0
Best bowling	6/71	2/23
Catches/stumpings	47/–	1/–
- Source: Cricinfo, 11 June 2024

John David Swanson (born 5 May 1940) is an Australian former cricketer and baseball player. He played 29 first-class cricket matches for Victoria between 1965/66 and 1970/71. He also played baseball for Victoria between 1964 and 1975 and Australia. He won the Claxton Shield batting title in 1967–1968 and won the Helms Award as MVP in 1968. He was an inaugural inductee in the Australian Baseball Hall of Fame in 2005. He worked full time for the Victorian Government Printer operating an offset printing service on the Treasury Reserve in East Melbourne.

== See also ==
- List of Victoria first-class cricketers
- 1965–66 Victorian district cricket final
