= Roy Gardner (cricketer) =

Australian cricketer

Personal information
- Born: 18 January 1914; Melbourne, Australia
- Died: 2 April 2004 (aged 90); Melbourne, Australia

Domestic team information
- Years: Team
- 1935-1936: Victoria
- Source: Cricinfo, 22 November 2015

Roy Gardner (18 January 1914 – 2 April 2004) was an Australian cricketer. He played three first-class cricket matches for Victoria between 1935 and 1936.

== See also ==
- List of Victoria first-class cricketers
