= Northcote Cricket Club =

- One Day name: Northcote Dragons

Personnel
- Captain: Joshua Sundberg
- Coach: Warren “Perc” Pereara
- Manager: Zach Whelan

Team information
- Colours: Green and Gold
- Home ground: Bill Lawry Oval

History
- 1st XI Two Day wins: 5
- 1st XI One Day wins: 1
- 1st XI T20 Cup wins: 0
- Official website: https://northcotecc.com

Northcote Cricket Club, nicknamed the Dragons, is an Australian cricket team competing in the Victorian Premier Cricket competition. The club was formed in the mid-1870s and joined the Premier Cricket competition in 1907. They have won 5 1st XI premierships in 1911/12, 1965-66, 1973/74, 1986/87 and 1996/97. The Dragons play home games at Bill Lawry Oval in Northcote.

== Notable players ==
- Bill Lawry
- Rodney Hogg
- Mick Lewis
- Albert Hartkopf
- Marcus Stoinis
- Matthew Short

== See also ==
- The 1965-66 Victorian District Cricket final
