= Essendon Cricket Club =

- One Day name: Essendon Bombers

Personnel
- Captain: Liam Molloy
- Coach: Ben Fletcher
- Chief executive: Simon Tobin (President)

Team information
- Colors: Red Black
- Founded: 1872
- Home ground: Windy Hill
- Secondary home ground: Cross Keys Reserve

History
- 1st XI 2 Day wins: 2
- 1st XI One Day wins: 0
- 1st XI T20 Cup wins: 0
- Other XI Wins wins: 15
- Official website: https://essendoncricketclub.com

Essendon Cricket Club is an Australian cricket club competing in the Victorian Premier Cricket competition. The club was first established in 1872. The club trains and plays at Windy Hill, Essendon, former training ground and administrative base of the Australian Football League team Essendon Football Club.

== Honours ==
=== Club Championships ===
- 1965/66
- 1967/68
- 2018/19

=== Premierships ===
Premierships for all teams in Victorian Premier Cricket.

Team	Two-day	One-day	T20
Team	Premiers	Premiers	Premiers
Firsts	2	0	0
Seconds	4	4	0
Thirds	2	1	0
Fourths	3	1	0

== See also ==
- The 1965-66 Victorian District Cricket final
