= Geelong Cricket Club =

Australian cricket club

GEELONG CRICKET CLUB
- Established 1992/93

The Geelong Cricket Club is a cricket club playing in Victorian Premier Cricket, the elite club cricket competition in Greater Melbourne, Australia.

The club was originally formed as a Sub-District club, entering the Victorian Sub-District Cricket Association in 1964/65. It made its debut at district/premier level as an amalgamated side with North Melbourne Cricket Club in 1985/86. This joint venture lasted for three seasons before disbanding, with North Melbourne continuing in the association on its own.

Geelong was admitted to the premier cricket competition as a single entity prior to the 1993/94 season. For its inaugural season, Michael King was club president, and former North Melbourne, St Kilda, South Melbourne and Victorian Shield representative Peter Cox was the inaugural First XI captain.

The club originally used the St. Mary's Football Club rooms as its headquarters during the season before moving to its current location on Geelong Cricket Ground in January 1996. The City of Greater Geelong and Geelong Football Club played a major role in developing the club after the move off Kardinia Park, with the building of the Ford Stand with seats facing the Geelong Cricket Ground. The two clubs still have a strong working relationship from which both parties benefit. Throughout this time, St. Mary's Football Club (West Kardinia Oval) has continued to be the venue for the club's third and fourth XI matches.

1st XI
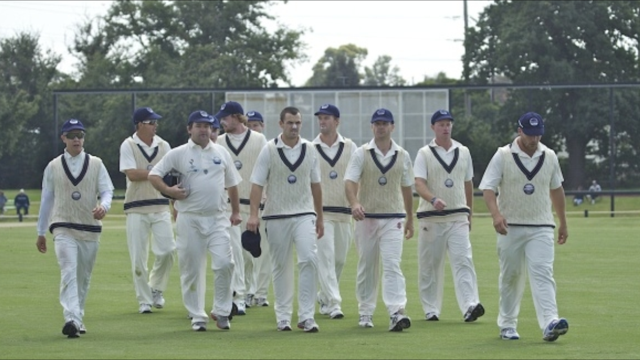
- Geelong team in 2009

Geelong Cricket Club players who have played state cricket for Victoria include: Jason Bakker, Clinton Peake, Kevin Neville, Brad Stacey, Daniel Lowery, Ben Oliver, Grant Lindsay, Aaron Finch and Jake K Reed. Finch has achieved more state and national success than any other Geelong player, playing internationals for Australia in all three forms and serving as captain for the ODI and T20 teams.

2nd XI
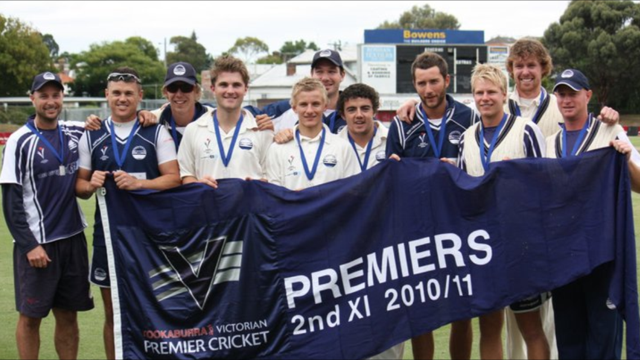
- Second XI One Day Premiers 2010/11

The club's won its first and, as of 2024/25, only First XI premier cricket premiership in 2009/10 in the Twenty20 format, defeating St Kilda in the final. The club has been successful in the minor grades, and as of 2024/25 has won six Second XI premierships, five Third XI premierships and three Fourth XI premiership across all forms of the game. The club has won two JA Seitz Trophies as the Club Champion in 2010/11 and 2011/12.

3rd XI
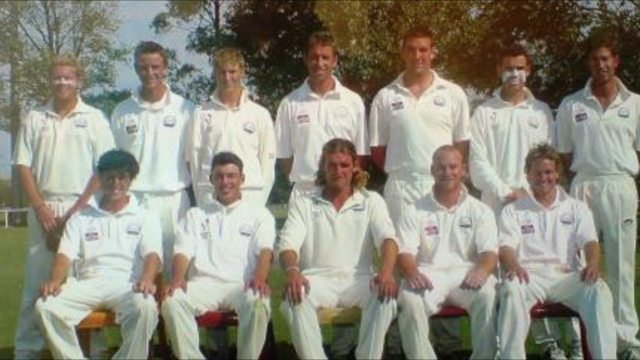
- Third XI One Day Premiers 2002/03

4th XI
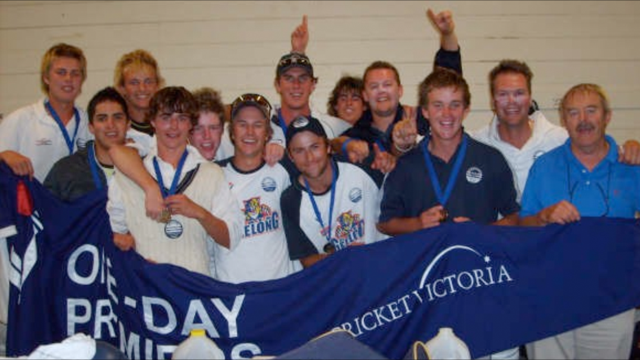
- Fourth XI One Day Premiers 2005/06

The club is yet to win a First XI two-day/overall premiership, having finished runner-up to Ringwood Cricket Club in 2007–08, and Carlton in 2018–19.
