= Sam Morris (cricketer) =

Australian cricketer (1855–1931)

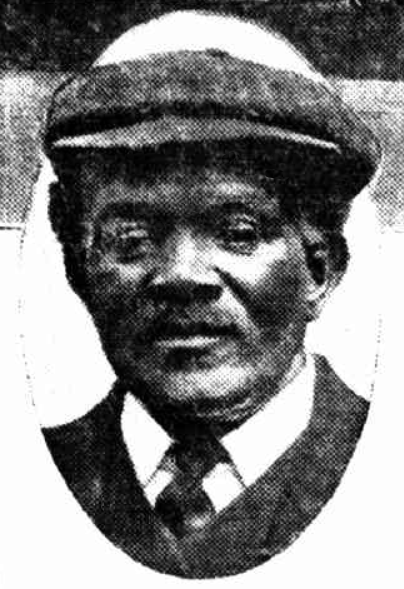

Personal information
- Born: 22 June 1855; Hobart, Van Diemen's Land
- Died: 20 September 1931 (aged 76); Albert Park, Melbourne, Victoria
- Batting: Right-handed
- Bowling: Right-arm medium, right-arm leg-spin
- Role: All-rounder, occasional wicket-keeper

International information
- National side: Australia
- Only Test (cap 35): 1 January 1885 v England

Domestic team information
- Years: Team
- 1881-82 to 1892-93: Victoria

Career statistics
Competition	Test	FC
Matches	1	20
Runs scored	14	591
Batting average	14.00	17.90
100s/50s	0/0	0/5
Top score	10*	64*
Balls bowled	136	1806
Wickets	2	31
Bowling average	36.50	26.09
5 wickets in innings	0	1
10 wickets in match	0	0
Best bowling	2/73	5/21
Catches/stumpings	0/–	13/–
- Source: Cricinfo, 24 October 2021

Samuel Morris (22 June 1855 – 20 September 1931) was an Australian cricketer who played in one Test in 1885. He was the first black man to play Test cricket, as well as the first person of West Indian heritage and the first Tasmanian-born player to play Tests. He and Andrew Symonds are the only people of West Indian heritage to play for Australia.

== Early life ==
Morris's mother Elizabeth McGuiness was born in Van Diemen's Land of West Indian parents. His father Isaac Morris was from Barbados and had travelled to Australia in the gold-rush years of the early 1850s. Sam was born in Hobart, Van Diemen's Land, in 1855, and the family moved to the Daylesford gold fields in the Colony of Victoria in the late 1850s. Isaac Morris played cricket in the Daylesford area and was soon joined by Sam, who became a prominent local player and represented the district several times.

== Cricket career ==
Morris was appointed groundsman of the Richmond Cricket Ground in 1880 and began playing for Richmond in December that year. He was successful straight away, and in February 1882 he scored 280 against St Kilda, setting a record for the highest score in the Australian colonies. It is still Richmond's highest score.

Morris was selected to play his first match for Victoria in March 1882, against South Australia in Adelaide. He played his second match two years later, also against South Australia in Adelaide; he made his highest first-class score of 64 not out and took five wickets in Victoria's four-wicket victory.

Morris built such a good reputation as groundsman at Richmond, that in 1884, when the University of Melbourne was establishing its ground, they appointed him to be the inaugural groundsman. He took over from the surveyors and prepared the ground to be ready for use in the 1885–86 season. He played for Richmond while he was developing the ground, then transferred to Carlton for the 1885–86 season, then played a season for University in 1886–87.

Although he was never a regular player for Victoria, Morris was one of nine Australian players to make their Test debuts in the second Test of the 1884–85 series against England at the Melbourne Cricket Ground. The selectors had been forced to choose an entirely new team after the eleven who played in the first Test refused to play over a payment dispute. Morris took two wickets in the match, including English captain Arthur Shrewsbury, and made 14 runs (4 as an opener in the first innings, 10 not out in the second batting at number ten) as Australia lost by ten wickets. Five of the Australians who were making their Test debuts, including Morris, never played Test cricket again.

In 1886-87, Morris took his best first-class bowling figures in the match against South Australia: 4 for 59 and, bowling unchanged through the second innings, 5 for 21 off 25 four-ball overs. In 1887 he was offered an increase in pay to take over as the groundsman for South Melbourne. He accepted, and began playing for South Melbourne, his fourth club in four seasons. He remained at South Melbourne until his sight deteriorated in the 1900s, forcing him to give up his work in 1907.

Morris played his last first-class match for Victoria in April 1893, scoring 52 in Victoria's victory over Western Australia at the Melbourne Cricket Ground. Between 1895 and 1899 he travelled with the Victorian team to Tasmania three times to umpire first-class matches between the two state teams.

Sam Morris has been a true and faithful follower of the game. He had an excellent record as a cricketer and had troops of friends who would never see him in want.

— Donald Mackinnon, on presenting the proceeds of a benefit in Morris' honour in 1909

In the early 1920s the cricketers of Daylesford contributed to the making of a large silver trophy for the district championship. Instituted for the 1922–23 season, it was called the Sam Morris Cup.

== Personal life ==
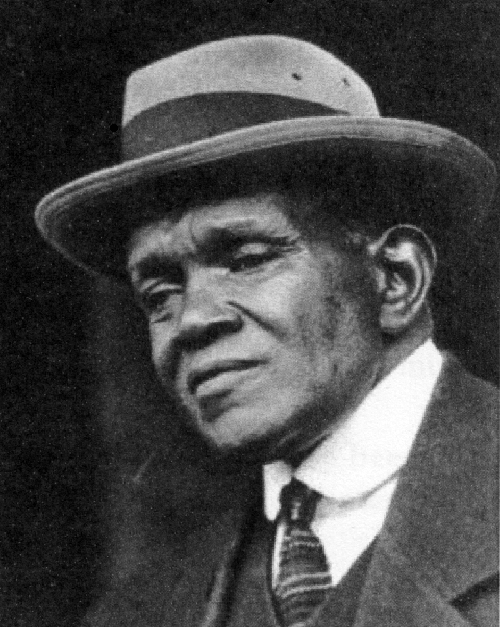
Morris in the later years of his life.

Morris married Julia Good in May 1881. She died aged 33 in March 1889. In September 1891 he married a widow, Jane McCracken. Their son William was born in late 1892. Jane died aged 45 in January 1905.

By 1908 Morris was totally blind. He was looked after by his de facto wife, Jean Eukermunder, as well as by several old cricketing friends, for the rest of his life. He still regularly attended cricket matches in Melbourne, and when the 1930-31 West Indian team played in Melbourne he met the members of the team at their hotel.

Morris died at his home in the Melbourne suburb of Albert Park on 20 September 1931, aged 76. The Australasian said, "By the death of Sam Morris Victoria has lost one of the most likeable characters that ever played the game in this State." His son William had several children, and there are many descendants.

== See also ==
- List of Victoria first-class cricketers
