= Richmond Cricket Club (Melbourne) =

Cricket club in Richmond, Victoria, Australia

The Richmond Cricket Club is an Australian cricket club based in Glen Waverley in the south-eastern suburbs of Melbourne, Victoria. The club plays in the Victorian Premier Cricket Association.

Founded in 1854, the Richmond Cricket Club home ground was for most of its history the Richmond Cricket Ground (better known as the Punt Road Oval), a few hundred metres to the east of the Melbourne Cricket Ground. It was a founding member of the Victorian District/Premier Cricket competition in 1906/07.

In 2011, the club moved its home base from Richmond to Central Reserve in Glen Waverley. It continued to be known as Richmond until the 2012/13 season. From the 2013/14 season until the 2019/20 season, the club traded as the Monash Tigers but legally remained known as the Richmond Cricket Club. Since the start of the 2020/21 season the club returned to the "Richmond Cricket Club" name while still playing out of Central Reserve.

== Australian Test cricketers ==
- John Hodges (1877)
- Tom Kendall (1877)
- Sam Morris (1885)
- Dave Smith (1912)
- Leo O'Brien (1932–36)
- Ernie McCormick (1935–38)
- Bill Johnston (1947–55)
- Doug Ring (1948–53)
- Graham Yallop (1976–84)
- Jim Higgs (1978–81)
- Paul Reiffel (1992–98)
- Cameron White (2008–2018)

== English Test Cricketers ==
- Paul Collingwood (2001–2011)

== Netherlands cricketers ==
- Scott Edwards (2018-)
- Fred Klaassen (2018-)

== Club achievements ==
=== Championships ===
- 1st XI Premiers: 6 (1946/47, 1976/77, 1982/83, 1989/90, 1999/2000, 2011/12) (White Ball Premiers 2014/15)
- 2nd XI Premiers: 12 (1914/15, 1926/27, 1931/32, 1937/38, 1946/47, 1950/51, 1959/60, 1979/80, 1985/86, 1987/88, 1988/89, 1989/90, 2014/15)
- 3rd XI Premiers: 5 (1952/53, 1971/72, 1988/89, 1998/99, 2006/07,2020/21)
- 4th XI Premiers: 1 (2016/17)

=== Innings Records ===
- Highest Score For: 8/647 v. St Kilda 1881/2
- Highest Score Against: 880 by Carlton 1898/9
- Lowest Score For: 15 v. Carlton 1921/22
- Lowest Score Against: 12 by South Melbourne 1869/70

== Individual Achievements ==
- Most Matches (Career): D.R. Cowper 294
- Jack Ryder Medal: P.D. Collingwood 2000/01

=== Batting records ===
- Most Runs (Career): J.A. Ledward 7,726
- Most Runs (Season): J.A. Ledward 834 – 1938/9
- Highest Score (Innings): S. Morris 280 v. St Kilda 1881/2

=== Bowling records ===
- Most Wickets (Career): G.C. Paterson 505
- Most Wickets (Season): G.C. Paterson 73 – 1965/66
- Best Figures (Innings): C. Manion 10/72 v. East Melbourne 1880/81
- Best Figures (Match): W.L. Kelly 11/29 (6/13 & 5/16) v. Northcote 1908/09

=== Wicket-Keeping Records ===
- Most Dismissals (Career): D.R. Cowper 588 (524 catches 64 stumpings)
- Most Dismissals (Season): G.J. Holland 51 (51 catches) 1999/2000
- Most Dismissals (Innings): G.J. Holland 7 (7 catches) v Camberwell Magpies 1997/98
- Most Dismissals (Match): G.J. Holland 10 (10 catches) v Camberwell Magpies 1997/98
