= Central Reserve =

Multi-sports complex in Glen Waverley, Victoria

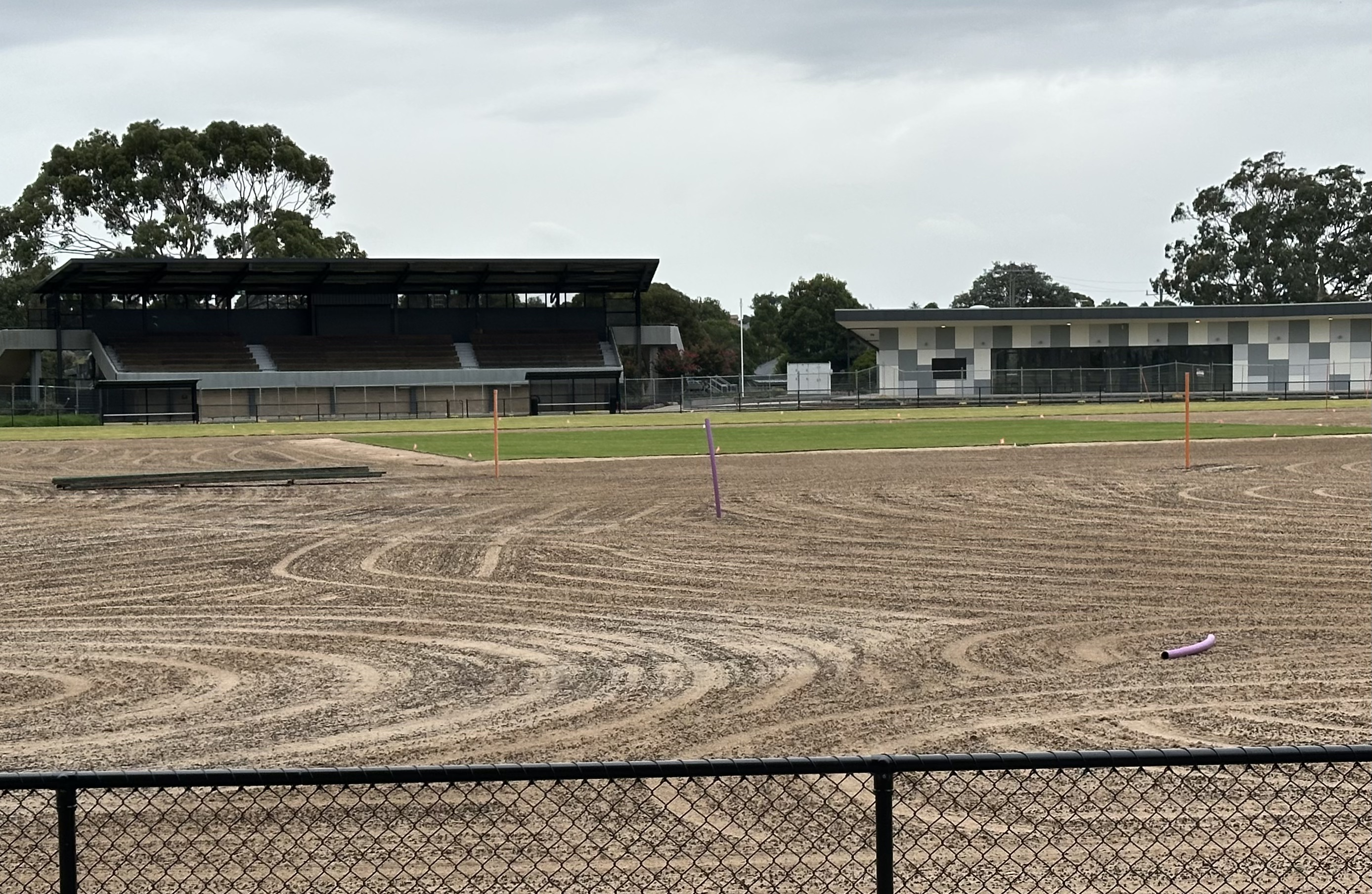
- South Oval during redevelopment in 2026
- Interactive map of Central Reserve
- Location: Glen Waverley, Victoria
- Coordinates: 37°53′31.08″S 145°09′43.70″E
- Owner: City of Monash
- Capacity: 6,000 (500 seated)
- Field size: 165 m × 145 m (541 ft × 476 ft)

Tenants
- Richmond Cricket Club (2010/11–pres); Waverley Cricket Club (1974/75–1987/88); Hawthorn-Waverley Cricket Club (1988/98–2002/03); Waverley Football Club (1961–1987); Glen Waverley Hawks (2013–present)

Central Reserve is a multi-sports complex in the Melbourne suburb of Glen Waverley. It includes two ovals (known as North Oval and South Oval) which host Australian rules football and cricket matches. The name also refers to the wider public park in which the ovals are located.

As of 2026, it is home to the Mazenod Old Collegians in the Victorian Amateur Football Association (VAFA), the Waverley Blues in the Eastern Football Netball League (EFNL) and the Richmond Cricket Club in the Victorian Premier Cricket (VPC) competition.

== History ==
Since the 1970s, the ground has been used by three separate Victorian District/Premier Cricket clubs. In the 1974/75 season, the Waverley Cricket Club was elevated from sub-district cricket to district cricket, and it played at Central Reserve until the 1989/90 season, when it merged with the sub-district Dandenong Cricket Club and moved to Shepley Oval, Dandenong.

The same year, the Hawthorn-East Melbourne Cricket Club moved to Central Reserve from its home ground at Glenferrie Oval, where the Hawthorn Football Club sought year-round use of the venue, and became known as Hawthorn-Waverley; the club played there until 2003-04, when it merged with the sub-district Monash University Cricket Club, became known as Hawthorn-Monash University, and moved to the oval at the university's Clayton campus.

Finally, in late 2010, the Richmond Cricket Club moved its home base from its traditional home at Punt Road Oval, Richmond, to Central Reserve, after a decade-long impasse with the Richmond Football Club over the use of the field during summer; the club changed its trading name to Monash Tigers in 2013-14, then changed it back to Richmond in 2020-21.

The ground has hosted one top level match: a List A tour match between Victoria and the touring Sri Lankans in the 2005/06 season. Victoria won the game by 7 wickets, thanks to five wickets from Allan Wise during the Sri Lankans innings of 120 all out. Michael Klinger then scored 51 not out alongside Andrew McDonald who scored 45 not out, with Victoria reaching 3/121.

The ground was also prominent as the home ground of the Waverley Football Club, which played in the Victorian Football Association from 1961 until 1987, and before that as the Glen Waverley Football Club in the Caulfield-Oakleigh District League. The oval and pavilion were upgraded in 1962 to bring it up to VFA standards, forcing the club to play its home games on the northern half of the wider Central Reserve for that season; a covered standing shelter was constructed in the mid-1960s, and the main grandstand was opened in 1969.

The wider Central Reserve area contains two football/cricket ovals, a skate park, a playground, and various other facilities. The main oval, used for premier cricket, is the northern oval.
