= Kevin Neville =

Australian cricketer (born 1968)

Kevin John Neville
Personal information
- Born: 24 March 1968 (age 58); Numurkah, Australia

Domestic team information
- Years: Team
- 1993: Victoria
- Source: Cricinfo, 10 December 2015

Kevin John Neville (born 24 March 1968) is an Australian former cricketer. Born on March 24, 1968, in Numurkah, Victoria, Australia, he scored his first century in district cricket while playing for Prahran Cricket Club against South Melbourne in 1989. In 1993 he was named to play for Victoria in a first-class cricket match against South Africa.

== See also ==
- List of Victoria first-class cricketers
