= Gary Watts =

Australian cricketer (born 1958)

Personal information
- Full name: Gary Maxwell Watts
- Born: 22 October 1958 (age 68); Dunolly, Victoria, Australia

Domestic team information
- Years: Team
- 1977-1991: Victoria
- Source: Cricinfo, 6 December 2015

Gary Maxwell Watts (born 22 October 1958) is an Australian former cricketer. He played 67 first-class cricket matches for Victoria between 1977 and 1991.

Watts played twenty-six seasons of district/premier cricket for Fitzroy/Fitzroy-Doncaster between 1975/76 and 2000/01, and scored a career total of 12,933 runs at 42.26. At the end of his career, he was the highest run-scorer in premier cricket history, having surpassed the record held by John Scholes; as of 2016, he sits second behind Warren Ayres.

== See also ==
- List of Victoria first-class cricketers
