= Graeme Rummans =

Australian cricketer (born 1976)

Personal information
- Full name: Graeme Clifford Rummans
- Born: 13 December 1976 (age 49); Camperdown, New South Wales, Australia
- Batting: Left-handed
- Bowling: Slow left-arm orthodox
- Role: Batsman

Domestic team information
- Years: Team
- 1997/98–2001/02: New South Wales
- 2002/03–2005/06: Victoria
- First-class debut: 5 March 1998 New South Wales v Tasmania
- Last First-class: 6 December 2005 Victoria v New South Wales
- List A debut: 31 October 1998 New South Wales v Australian Capital Territory
- Last List A: 2 January 2006 Victoria v New South Wales

Career statistics
Competition	First-class	List A
Matches	38	57
Runs scored	1605	1264
Batting average	29.18	30.82
100s/50s	2/8	11/0
Top score	188	75
Balls bowled	341	184
Wickets	8	3
Bowling average	33.50	57.66
5 wickets in innings	0	0
10 wickets in match	0	–
Best bowling	3/24	2/56
Catches/stumpings	17/0	11/0
- Source: CricketArchive, 12 November 2011

Graeme Clifford Rummans (born 13 December 1976) is an Australian cricketer. He was born in the suburb of Camperdown in Sydney. Later growing up in Roselands in Sydney. He is a left-handed batsman who bowls slow left-arm orthodox.

Rummans went to Narwee High School in Sydney's South. He played all of his Junior cricket in the St George DCA for Kingsgrove and captained all St George junior cricket teams before making his Grade debut.

He initially debuted for the New South Wales Sheffild Shield team on 5 March 1998. Batting at number six he only managed eleven when he was trapped in front by Colin Miller.

His career suffered a major setback in 2002 when he tested positive for the banned masking agent probenecid. For his offence he received a one-month ban from all cricket and a A$2000 fine.

Ahead of the following season he moved to Victoria in an effort to further his first-class career, yet despite large success at club level with St Kilda (where he won consecutive Ryder Medals as the best player in Premier Cricket), Rummans was unable to attain a regular position with the state team.

He moved back to New South Wales after the 2006–7 season for family reasons and captained St George to successive First Grade premierships. He returned to Victoria for the 2009–10 season, during which he won his third Ryder Medal.

Rummans is one of the most prolific winners in Australian Grade/First Class cricket history.

== See also ==
- List of New South Wales representative cricketers
