= Craig James (economist) =

Australian economist

- Born: 2 March 1962 (age 64); Sydney, Australia

Academic background
- Education: University of New South Wales

Academic work
- Institutions: CommSec

Craig James (born 2 March 1962) is an Australian economist who was chief economist of CommSec until October 2024. As of September 2012, according to The Australian, James was the third most quoted man in Australian media. Completing regular media appearances in Australia and internationally, his reports such as the iPod index and State of the States are often reported upon and often called a "user-friendly" economic outlook for average individuals.

== Career ==
After leaving Narwee Boys' High School in 1979, James joined the Rural bank, while undertaking his Bachelor of Commerce (Economics) at the University of New South Wales in 1984. He completed a Master of Commerce (Economics) in 1988. James worked in branches, continuing on to Corporate, Planning and Economic Research, while the Rural Bank changed into the State Bank of New South Wales, followed by Colonial Group. He became chief economist of Colonial Group in September 1997, later becoming chief economist at CommSec in August 2000 with the Commonwealth takeover of Colonial.

In 2002, James joined The Australian Financial Review to pursue his interest in journalism – although re-joined Commsec in 2003 – combining his interests in journalism and electronic media.

At the start of 2012, James was appointed as adjunct professor in the Curtin Business School.

In combination with James' regular TV, radio and print appearances, he completes a number of unique reports such as the State of the States and the iPod index. Published quarterly, State of the States offer economic feedback on Australian States' performance. Rankings and indicators designed by James are often covered by general media such as The Mercury, the ABC and the Sydney Morning Herald.

== Personal life ==
James has a personal interest in athletics and weight training. He finished in the top six for the Men's Health Man of the Year 2011 competition. Craig has recently revealed that he is suffering from Parkinson's disease.
