= Whitten Oval =

Stadium in Melbourne, Victoria, Australia

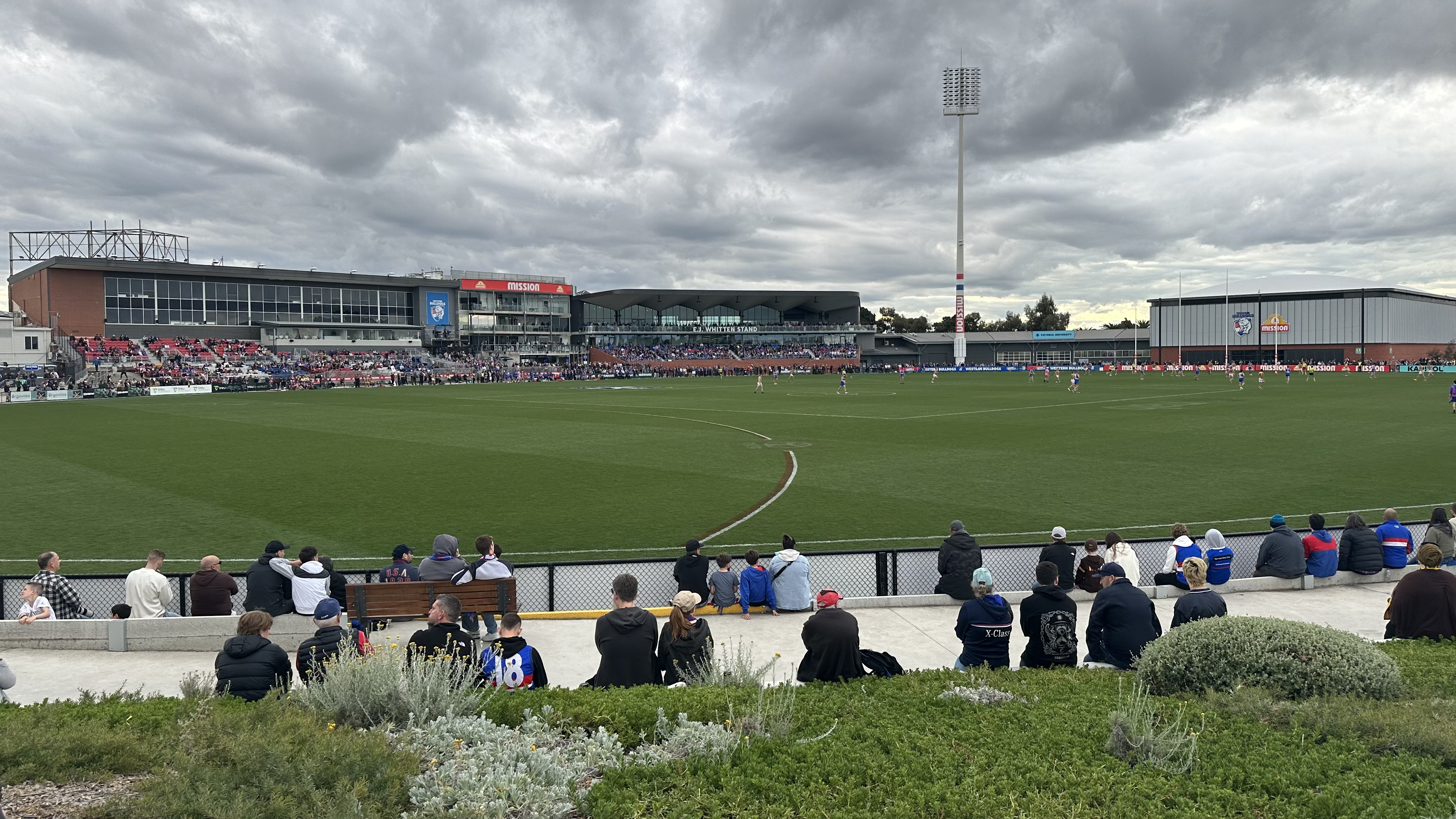
- Whitten Oval in September 2025
- Interactive map of Whitten Oval
- Former names: Western Oval (1883–1995); VU Whitten Oval (2013–2024)
- Location: 417 Barkly Street, Footscray, Victoria
- Coordinates: 37.799166°S 144.886748°E
- Capacity: 7,000
- Surface: Grass
- Record attendance: 42,354 (1955 VFL season)

Tenants
- Western Bulldogs/Footscray Football Club Administration & Training (1883–present); VFA (1886–1924); VFL/AFL (1925–1997) (Note: Excluding 1942, when the oval was being utilised by military personnel and the club played home matches at Yarraville Oval.); VFL (2014–present); VFLW (2016–present); AFLW (2017–present) Other Teams Footscray Cricket Club (VPC) (1883–1996); Footscray JUST (National Soccer League) (1980); Yarraville Football Club (VFA) (1983); Brunswick United (National Soccer League) (1993-1994); Fitzroy Football Club (AFL) (1994–1996); Western United FC (A-League Men) (2020); Melbourne Monarchs (ABL) (1990s)

Whitten Oval (known under naming rights as Mission Whitten Oval) is an Australian rules football venue located in the Melbourne suburb of Footscray. It has been the home of the Western Bulldogs (originally known as the Footscray Football Club) since 1883.

The venue hosted Footscray's senior men's matches – first in the Victorian Football Association (VFA) and later in the Victorian/Australian Football League (VFL/AFL) – near-continuously until the end of the 1997 season. It has continued to serve as the club's training and administrative headquarters, while also hosting AFL Women's (AFLW), Victorian Football League (VFL), and VFL Women's (VFLW) matches.

Formerly known as the Western Oval, the venue was renamed in 1995 in honour of Ted Whitten, a former player, captain and coach for the club. A statue of Whitten is located at the entrance of the oval.

== History ==
The Whitten Oval is the centrepiece of a reserve that, from 1860, was a stone quarry used by the railways. In 1866, the quarry was turned into a reserve that included botanical gardens. Other former quarries within the City of Footscray that were turned into public gardens in this era include the Yarraville Reserve, which is the site of the current Yarraville Oval, off Williamstown Road; the Yarraville Gardens, off Hyde Street; and Footscray Park, which fronts the Maribyrnong River.

In 1886, after moving from ground to ground, the local council granted the local football club permission to use the Western Reserve as its home ground. In 1883, the Prince Imperial Football Club reverted to its original name from its formation in the mid-1870s and Footscray Football Club was reformed. The club had to turn the gardens into a football field, building a railing system to surround the playing and dragging the pavilion from the Barkly Street end to the other.

While the gardens became known as the David Spurling Reserve, the oval within the gardens became the Western Oval.

Footscray used Western Oval as its home ground almost continuously until 1997. It was absent from the ground only in 1942, when it was commandeered by military personnel during World War II; during that season, Footscray played its home games at the nearby Yarraville Oval, which was vacant because the VFA, in which the regular tenant Yarraville Football Club competed, was in recess. In 1943, the club returned to Western Oval.

In 1955, the ground record attendance was set for the oval when 42,354 turned out on 9 July to see then-defending premiers Footscray defeat Collingwood by six points in Round 12, 1955. In 1965, Footscray considered leaving Western Oval, and made an application to the City of Sunshine for a lease at the new football ground it was developing at Skinner Reserve, approximately 3 km west in Braybrook; the Sunshine Council ultimately rejected the application, as it would have required the breaking of an agreement it already had with the VFA's Sunshine Football Club.

=== NSL, Fitzroy, renaming, and end of AFL matches ===
In 1983, struggling VFA Division 2 club Yarraville played its home games at Western Oval on Sundays. This was the only season of the arrangement, as the club folded before the 1984 season.

In addition to its use as a VFL/AFL ground, the Western Oval also hosted 9 National Soccer League matches during the 1980s and 1990s: Footscray JUST played 5 matches at the ground during the 1980 National Soccer League, with an average attendance of 3,398, while Brunswick United played 4 matches at the ground during the 1993–94 National Soccer League season, with an average attendance of 1,306. The highest attended National Soccer League match played at Western Oval was Footscray JUST's match against Heidelberg United on Sunday 17 August 1980, which drew a crowd of 6,734, while the lowest attended National Soccer League match played at Western Oval was Brunswick United's match against Brisbane Strikers on Sunday 7 March 1994, which drew a crowd of 773.

In 1994, the struggling Fitzroy Football Club began playing its home matches at the Western Oval, sharing the venue with Footscray, as it sought a better financial arrangement than it had received at its previous home Princes Park. During this time Whitten Oval had a crowd capacity of 25,000.

In 1995, the oval was renamed the Whitten Oval, after the death of the football club's most prominent player, Ted Whitten. The driveway leading from Barkly Street to the car park behind the oval was named Whitten Avenue.

In 1996, the Footscray Football Club attempted to get an injunction against the Fitzroy Football Club merging with any other club in the AFL, claiming such a move would break Fitzroy's 20-year lease to play their home games at Whitten Oval. The court dismissed the claim, saying damages rather than an injunction should have been sought. Following Fitzroy's merger with Brisbane after the 1996 AFL season, the Western Bulldogs moved their primary home ground for matches from Whitten Oval to Princes Park in Carlton, with the club still scheduled to play two home matches at Whitten Oval. However, prior to their Round 1 encounter with Fremantle, the ground was condemned and the Fremantle match was moved to Optus Oval. Eventually the Bulldogs announced their intention to no longer play AFL matches at Whitten Oval, instead playing home games at Princes Park, until moving to Docklands Stadium in the 2000 season. A farewell premiership match was staged at the venue in Round 21, 1997 before a crowd of 26,704; the Bulldogs 12.14 (86) defeated West Coast 10.8 (68). After moving home matches away from the venue, the Bulldogs retain a training and administrative base at the venue.

== Current use and growth of VFL/AFLW football ==
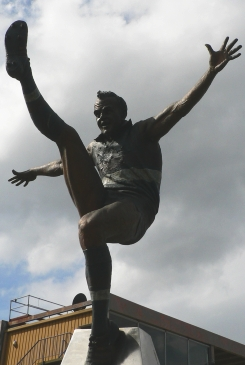
The E.J Whitten statue that stands outside of Whitten Oval

After the appointment of Campbell Rose as Chief Executive of the football club in 2002, discussions commenced on a redevelopment of Whitten Oval. In September 2004, the club secured a deal for a $19.5 million redevelopment, with contributions from the federal government ($8.0m), Western Bulldogs Forever Foundation ($5.5m), Victorian Government ($3.0m), Australian Football League ($1.5m) and the City of Maribyrnong ($1.0m). Construction commenced in 2005, and was completed in 2009. The renovated facility included a 120 place childcare centre, a conference and convention centre and a professional sports, medical, and health care centre for the Western Bulldogs.

In 2014, the ground started hosting home matches for the Western Bulldogs men's reserves team, known as Footscray, which competes in the Victorian Football League. Since the Bulldogs received a license to field a team in the inaugural season of the AFL Women's (AFLW) competition in 2017, the club has played home matches for its women's teams at Whitten Oval.

A-League club Western United held a home match at the venue against Adelaide United on 26 January 2020, with Adelaide winning the match 4–3 in front of a crowd of 5,988. This was the first association football match to be played at the ground since 1994, with the crowd of 5,988 being the largest association football crowd at the ground since 1980.

=== 2022-2024 redevelopments ===
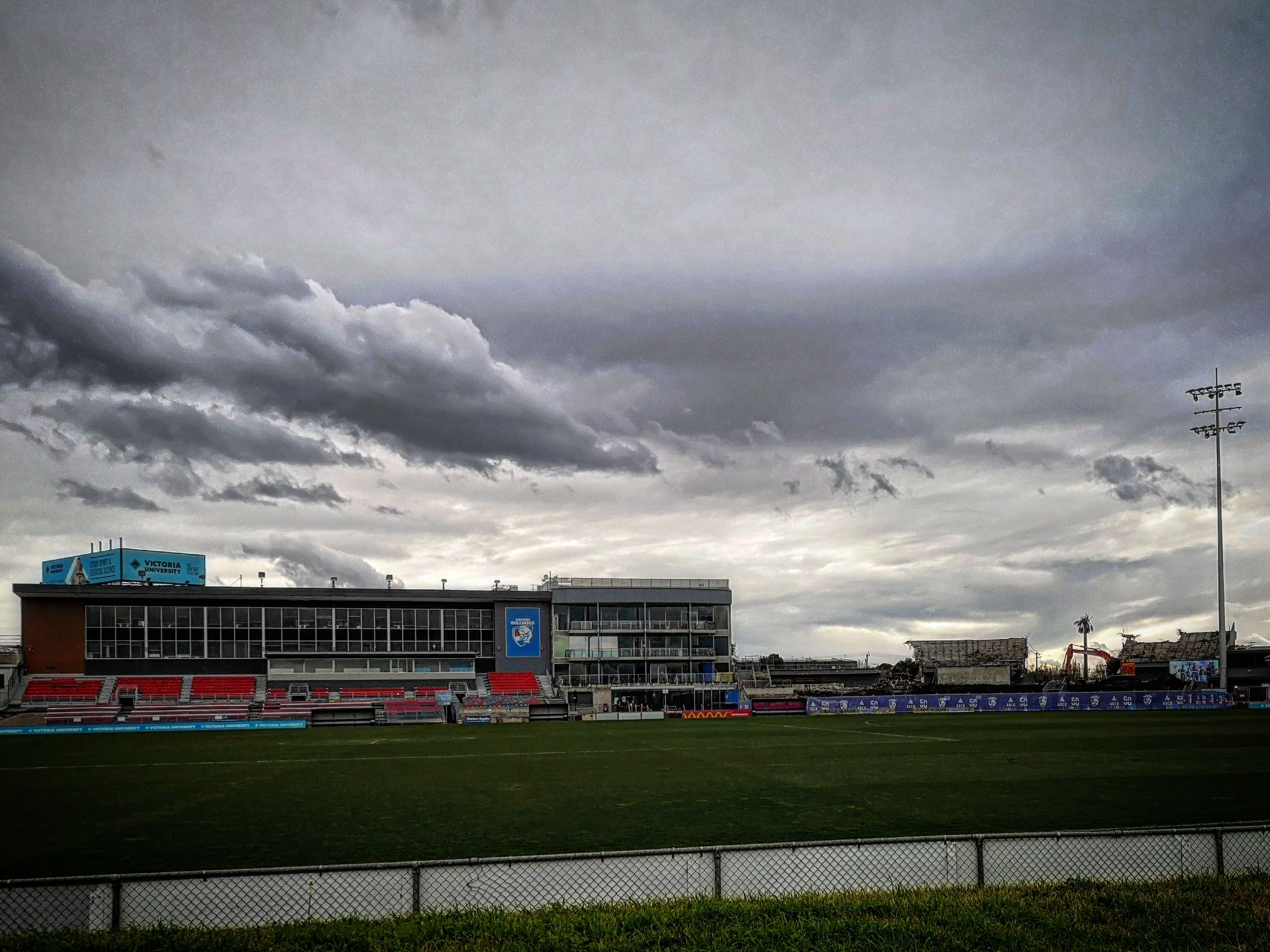
Whitten Oval in August 2022 following the demolition of the E.J. Whitten Stand

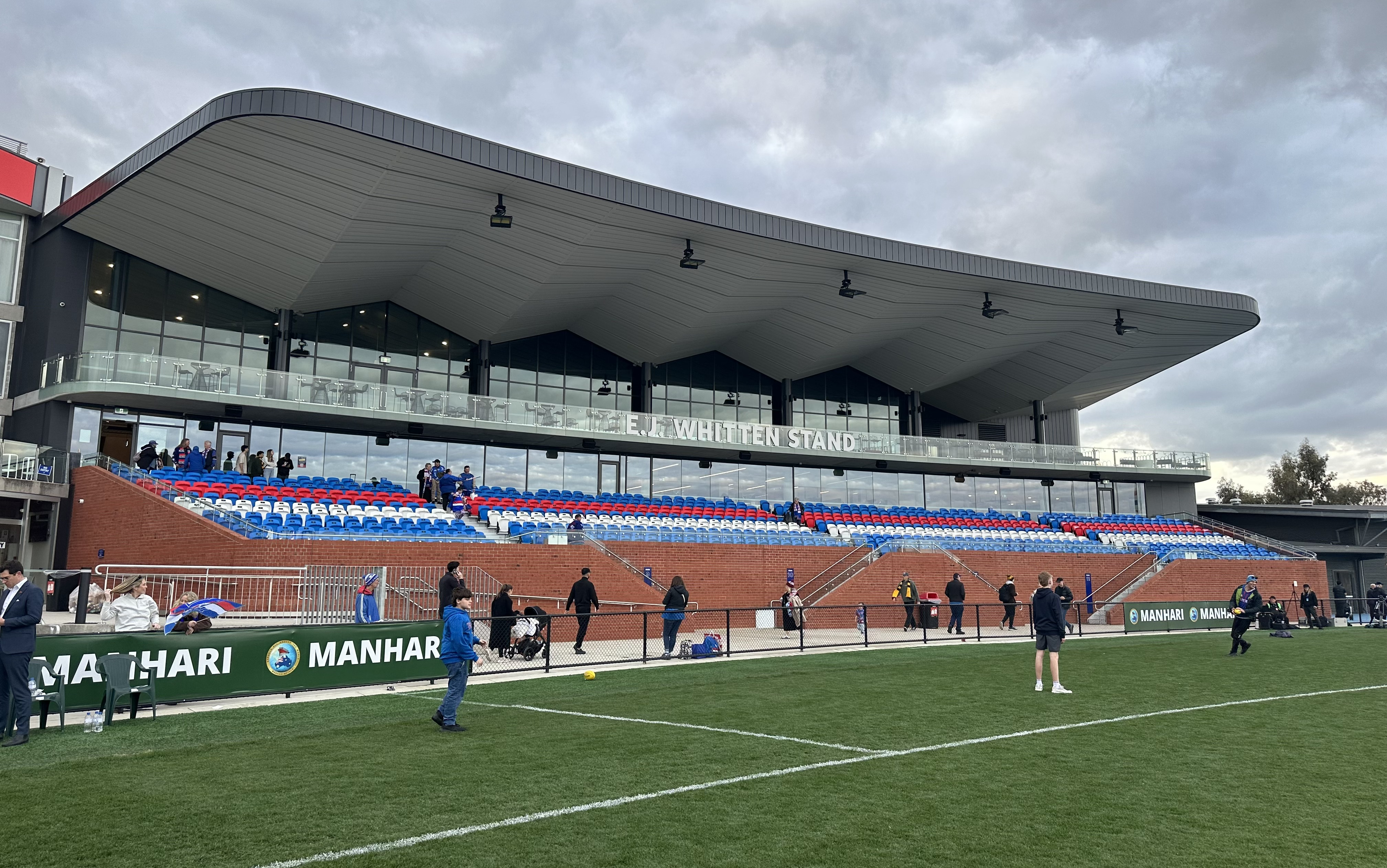
The E.J. Whitten Stand in September 2025 following redevelopment

In May 2019 the Western Bulldogs unveiled a $150 million redevelopment plan to upgrade spectator facilities at Whitten Oval. The proposal would boost the capacity to 18,000 and result in the reconstruction of the EJ Whitten Stand, add seating around the ground, install permanent broadcast-quality lighting, and construct an indoor training field and convention centre. The following year the club confirmed that $58 million would be spent to proceed with the EJ Whitten Stand reconstruction and permanent lighting, as well as the re-size the oval, install terracing on the eastern and southern side of the ground and make other alterations. This is referred to as the "Stage 2 redevelopment".

As of January 2021, $36.8 million was secured (from the Victorian Government), with the sources for the remaining amount unspecified. Council approval was granted in late 2020. In mid-2022 the club confirmed that construction would soon proceed over an 18-month period and include the rebuilding of the Whitten Grandstand, construction of a high-performance centre and indoor sports field, realignment of the oval surface, improvement in spectator amenities, and facilities for the club's foundation and women's health programs.

The demolition and replacement of the EJ Whitten Stand commenced in July 2022 and the oval's redevelopment was completed in July 2024. The new EJ Whitten Stand was completely rebuilt to include 920 undercover seats in club colors, behind which an 82-seat theatrette with a 10 square-metre video board, the club museum, merchandise shop and administration facilities were constructed.

The football department was relocated to the Barkly Street end of the ground, which incorporates a 1800 square-metre indoor training field, large gymnasium, a heat chamber, a 15-person sauna, and cold and hot pools.

In February 2024, Mission Foods, a long-term partner of the Bulldogs, was announced as the new naming rights sponsor of Whitten Oval.

== Past characteristics ==
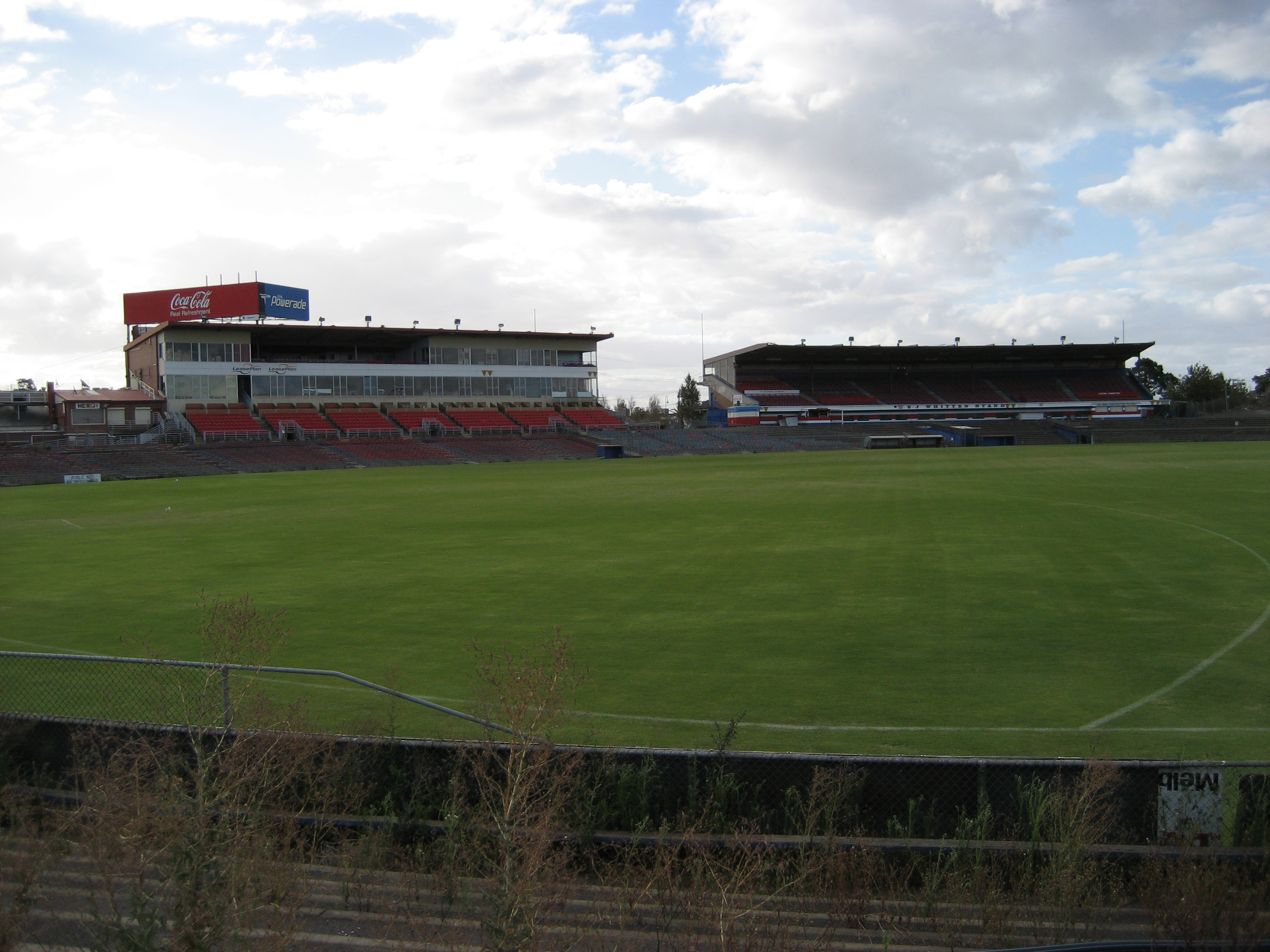
View of the oval in 2007

During its VFL/AFL playing days, Whitten Oval was known for being particularly long and narrow with deep squarish pockets, and for the wild wind which often bellowed over the ground, particularly at the Geelong Road end. These reasons, most specifically the wind, meant that the oval was the site of many abnormally low scoring games, inaccurate scoring tallies and games in which more than 80% of all scoring was kicked to one end. The ground developed a demographic of the "ground visiting sides hated to play at", with passionate Bulldog supporters and its distinctive playing conditions making it an arduous task to leave with a win.

In a game illustrating the worst that the Western Oval wind could offer, Footscray defeated Fitzroy in a close game, 14.9 (93) to 13.7 (85), in Round 10, 1964 – of the total of 178 points scored in the game, only 7 were scored against the wind. When Footscray played Fitzroy in Round 17, 1927, only 6 of 173 points were kicked against the wind. In 1948's Footscray versus Geelong game, only 2 of the 58 scoring shots were made into the wind. The wind was so fierce that when the Geelong full-back, Bruce Morrison, kicked the ball off after Footscray had scored a behind, the ball floated back over his head and went through the goals. The goal umpire signalled a "forced behind". While these are extreme examples, it was common to see no more than two or three goals kicked into the wind, while 14 or 15 would be scored at the other end.

== Community use ==
Post-use as a VFL/AFL stadium, the Whitten Oval is now primarily used as the training ground for the Western Bulldogs.

A number of local community groups, schools and sporting organisations utilise the ground; particularly because of its close proximity to the Melbourne CBD and local transport. The ground also plays host to a variety of commercially oriented tenancies, including retail (The Western Bulldogs merchandise shop, Bulldogs Central) and health (Physioplus Footscray). It also headquarters the WMR (Western Metropolitan Region) division of DEECD, which oversees all government schools in Melbourne's West.

The Victorian Women's Football League (VWFL) utilised the ground for games and finals until its demise as a competition in 2015. Other local groups have utilised the facility on numerous occasions, including the Rec Footy competition and the Bulldogs Family Day.

== Footscray Cricket Club ==
The ground ceased to be a used as a regular cricket venue at the end of 1996. From 1893 until December 1996, it was the home of the Footscray Cricket Club, which played in the Victorian district/premier cricket competition. From 1997, the club moved to the Mervyn G. Hughes Oval in northern Footscray.

== Transport ==
Whitten Oval is serviced by West Footscray railway station and local bus lines.

== Trivia ==
- Fifteen Canary Island date palm trees line the footpath north of the oval, facing Barkly Street.
- Of the 15 palms that line the reserve's northern border, 10 are south of the entrance to Whitten Avenue and five are north of the entrance.
- Behind the palms, to the north of the entrance, is the Lions Club of Footscray Memorial Playground.
- In 1937 the oval was used to host the first interclub Trugo match with Yarraville coming out victors over Footscray by 7 goals.
- The Western Oval was the home ground of the Footscray Trugo Club from 1937 until 1940 when the club moved to purpose-built facilities in Buckly Street.

== See also ==
- AFL Women's venues
- List of Australian rules football statues
