= Narwee High School =

Location
- Narwee, New South Wales; Australia; 33°56′59″S 151°04′09″E

Information
- Type: Public, co-educational, secondary school
- Motto: Latin: Justus esto et non Metue (Be just and fear not)
- Established: 1958
- Status: Closed
- Closed: 2001
- Campus: Chamberlain Street, Narwee
- Colours: Gold, black and blue

Narwee High School (abbreviation:NHS), known from 1958-1991 as Narwee Boys' High School (abbreviation:NBHS), is a former high school in the south-western Sydney suburb of Narwee, New South Wales, Australia.

Narwee High School operated as a boys' high school from January 1958 until December 1990. However, due to declining enrolments, the school became co-educational in January 1991. This was not a saving grace however, and due to a continuing decline in student numbers, the school was declared surplus to the needs of the New South Wales Department of Education and Training and was officially closed in December 2001. The closure was associated with the reorganisation of high schools in the district, and the formation of the Georges River College whereby students from various local high schools feed into a senior college campus.

On 5 November 2003, a major fire broke out on the top floor of a three-story building in the disused school causing extensive damage. There are currently plans to redevelop the site for a mixture of low and medium density private housing, with preservation of some open space for public use. In late 2005, demolition work commenced and was completed by March 2006.

== Notable alumni ==
- Russell Dunlop – musician, singer, composer and record producer
- Richard Farleigh – financial investor, (class of 1978)
- Craig James – Chief Economist of Commsec (class of 1979)
- Mark Knight – editorial cartoonist for the Herald Sun (class of 1979)
- Morris Iemma – former Premier of New South Wales from 2005-2008
- Graeme Rummans – cricketer, has played for the NSW Blues and Victorian Bushrangers
