= Kingston Hawthorn Cricket Club =

Australian cricket club

- One Day name: Kingston Hawks

Team information
- Colors: Gold , Red & Navy Blue
- Founded: 2015
- Home ground: Walter Galt Reserve
- Official website: https://www.khcc.com.au/

Walter Galt Reserve
Ground information
- Location: Victoria St, Parkdale VIC 3195
- Country: Australia
- Establishment: 1962

Team information
Kingston Saints Cricket Club	(1994 - 2015)
Kingston Hawthorn Cricket Club	(2015 - Present)

The Kingston Hawthorn Cricket Club is an Australian cricket club based at Walter Galt Reserve, situated in Parkdale, Victoria. They play in Victorian Premier Cricket, the highest competition in the state.

== History ==
The club was originally known as East Melbourne. It shared dominance of Melbourne cricket with its neighbour, the Melbourne Cricket Club. East Melbourne won the Victorian cricket competition 20 times and was runner-up another 20 times. When the Victorian Railways took over the East Melbourne Oval for expansion to its railyards the club amalgamated with Hawthorn (Sub-District) in 1921 and moved to Glenferrie Oval, playing as Hawthorn-East Melbourne.

In the 1980s, the club was hampered by the success of its co-tenant, the Hawthorn Football Club, and being unable to use the oval until after the football club's finals campaign had finished, the cricket club agreed with financial assistance to relocate. In 1989, it moved to Central Reserve, Waverley and became known as Hawthorn Waverley, after the former Waverley Cricket Club amalgamated with the Dandenong Cricket Club at Dandenong.

The club amalgamated with Monash University (Sub-District) in 2003 and moved to the Monash University Sports Complex in Clayton in 2004, changing its name to Hawthorn-Monash University.

The club's Monash University ground was taken over during 2015 by a new residential development on the campus. The club initially announced in late 2014 that it would amalgamate with the premier Dandenong Cricket Club from the 2015–16 season, and likely be based at Dandenong's Shepley Oval; but the merger collapsed in March 2015 when the clubs were unable to agree on terms. Consequently, the club instead merged with the sub-district Kingston Saints Cricket Club to form the Kingston Hawthorn Cricket Club, and moved to Kingston's Walter Galt Reserve in Parkdale.

== Premierships ==
District era: 1906-2002
First grade premierships as East Melbourne, Hawthorn East Melbourne or Hawthorn Waverley:

- 1906–07 East Melbourne
- 1907–08 East Melbourne
- 1927–28 Hawthorn East Melbourne
- 1949–50 Hawthorn East Melbourne
- 1950–51 Hawthorn East Melbourne
- 1955–56 Hawthorn East Melbourne
- 1962–63 Hawthorn East Melbourne
- 1971–72 Hawthorn East Melbourne
- 1998–99 Hawthorn Waverley
