= John Scholes (cricketer) =

Australian sportsperson (1950–2003)

Personal information
- Full name: Walter John Scholes
- Born: 5 January 1950; East Brunswick, Victoria
- Died: 14 July 2003 (aged 53); North Eltham, Victoria
- Batting: Right-handed
- Bowling: Right-arm leg-break
- Role: Batsman

Domestic team information
- Years: Team
- 1968/69–1981/82: Victoria

Career statistics
Competition	First-class	LA
Matches	62	17
Runs scored	3,201	443
Batting average	30.77	31.64
100s/50s	3/23	0/4
Top score	156	95
Balls bowled	278	–
Wickets	1	–
Bowling average	140.00	–
5 wickets in innings	0	–
10 wickets in match	0	–
Best bowling	1/28	–
Catches/stumpings	44/–	8/–
- Source: CricketArchive, 26 December 2014

Walter John Scholes (5 January 1950 – 14 July 2003) was an Australian first-class cricketer and coach. He also played 30 games of Australian rules football for North Melbourne Football Club between 1967 and 1971, scoring 35 goals as a rover before a knee injury cut short his football career.

Scholes was a successful junior cricketer, captaining the Victorian under-15s to victory in the Sydney carnival. He once scored 100 runs and took 10 wickets in a game, becoming the first ever Australian schoolboy to do so.

In the 1968–69 season he made his debut for Victoria, aged just 18. He was appointed Victoria's youngest ever captain at the time when 21 years of age, by the end of his 62-game career, the right-hander made 3,201 runs at 30.78.

Scholes became coach of Victoria and led them to victory in the 1998/99 Mercantile Mutual Cup. He was also a Victorian selector for a time.

Nicknamed affectionately as "Barrel", he was well respected by the Australian sporting community.

Scholes played a long career in Victorian district/premier cricket, playing 23 seasons for Carlton from 1965-66 until 1987–88, then eight seasons for Fitzroy Doncaster from 1988-89 until 1995–96. His career totals of 396 matches and 12,693 runs both surpassed the long-standing record held by Jack Ryder (338 matches and 12,667 runs); as of 2016, he sits third on the list of all-time run-scorers. The player of the Premier final is now awarded the "John Scholes Medal".

He died on 14 July 2003, from a heart attack.
