= Mark Knight (cartoonist) =

Australian-based political cartoonist

Mark Knight (born 1962) is an Australian cartoonist. He is currently the editorial cartoonist for the Herald Sun, a daily tabloid newspaper in Melbourne. Knight was also the last editorial cartoonist for one of the Herald Sun's joint predecessor newspapers, the afternoon broadsheet The Herald.

== Childhood ==
Born in Marrickville, Sydney, Knight grew up in Lakemba, attended Wiley Park Primary School and then Narwee Boys' High School. He showed an early interest in drawing which was encouraged by his artistic father. Knight's first cartoons were of his family and their idiosyncrasies, drawn at family gatherings. When he was six years old, Knight's father bought him Paul Rigby's cartoon annual of 1967; Rigby's work influence his artwork for many years. He created scrapbooks of Rigby's cartoons cut from The Daily Telegraph, and studied and imitated them while developing his cartooning style.

Knight started a cadetship in 1980 in the Fairfax art department, filling in the black squares in the crossword grids. He went to East Sydney Technical College and studied life drawing, painting, drawing and etching.

== Career ==
An advertisement for Knight's AFL Premierships posters in Melbourne, Australia

In 1999 Knight and Bill Leak were criticised by the Labor Party's deputy leader, Jenny Macklin, who said that cartoons such as those by Knight and Leak showing Meg Lees in sexual relations with John Howard were demeaning to women politicians.

Knight created the children's character "Leuk the Duck" (derived from leukemia), a mascot for the Challenge cancer foundation which has subsequently been used in the organisation's educational material.

After cartoonist William Ellis Green ("WEG") died in 2008, Knight took over his role as the Herald Sun's creator of Australian Football League (AFL) premiership posters. In 2017 on The Front Bar ahead of that year's grand final between Richmond and Adelaide, he unveiled a poster showing co-host and Richmond fan Mick Molloy wearing a Tiger onesie.

Knight's 2018 cartoon of Serena Williams

In September 2018, after tennis player Serena Williams was penalised for code violations during the 2018 US Open, Knight created a cartoon depicting Williams with exaggerated, masculine features and red lips reminiscent of racist caricatures of the 19th and 20th century. Knight was also criticised because Williams' opponent in the match was Naomi Osaka, a Japanese-Haitian, but the cartoon depicted Osaka as a blonde white woman. Knight and the Herald Sun defended the caricature as depicting Williams' behaviour and having nothing to do with race. Knight said he knew nothing of the Jim Crow period or drawings. A day later, the Herald Sun reprinted the cartoon on the front page with the headline "Welcome to PC World". After receiving several complaints, the Australian Press Council ruled in February 2019 that the cartoon did not breach its media standards.

== Awards ==
Knight won a Quill Award for Best Cartoon in 2001 from the Melbourne Press Club. In 2005, he won a Gold Quill Award from the Melbourne Press Club for the best cartoon of the year.

He was named The Age Cartoonist of the Year at the 22nd annual Stan Cross Awards ceremony on 4 November 2007. His other accolades include awards in the categories Single Gag (2003) and Editorial (1995, 2006).

In 2004, Knight was also presented with a Walkley Award for his cartoon named "Benefits of a Bedtime Story".

In 2003, he received an award as part of the Australian Comedy Awards in the visual category for Outstanding Cartoonist as well as another Walkley Award.
