= Footscray Cricket Club =

Australian cricket team

Personnel
- Captain: Travis Dean
- Coach: Allan Wise
- Bowling coach: Merv Hughes

Team information
- Colours: Red, White & Blue
- Founded: 1883
- Home ground: Mervyn G Hughes Oval, Farnsworth Avenue, Footscray
- Official website: footscraycricket.com

Footscray Cricket Club is an Australian cricket team competing in the Victorian Premier Cricket competition.

== History ==
The Footscray Cricket Club was founded in 1883 and for the first 113 years of its existence was located at the Western Oval until 1996 when combined pressure exerted by the Footscray Football Club and state-government-appointed commissioners to the City of Maribyrnong saw the club relocated to the Mervyn G. Hughes Oval.

Footscray's Test representatives in order of debut are Ron Gaunt, Les Joslin, Ken Eastwood, Alan Hurst, Ray Bright, Merv Hughes, Tony Dodemaide, Colin Miller and John Hastings. The Footscray Cricket Club joined the Victorian Premier Cricket competition in 1947–48, providing players of the western suburbs of Melbourne the chance to play at the highest level of club cricket. The club was premiers in season 1979–1980 and 2013–2014.

From 2000–01 until 2003–04, the club was known as the Footscray-Victoria University Cricket Club due to a partnership with the university; then, from 2004–05 until 2016–17, the club was known as the Footscray-Edgewater Cricket Club, owing to a sponsorship deal with property developers in the suburb's Edgewater estate.
