= Fitzroy Doncaster Cricket Club =

- One Day name: Fitzroy Doncaster Lions

Personnel
- Captain: Liam Banthorpe
- Coach: Matthew Bremner
- Bowling coach: Sam Elliott
- Chief executive: Michael Fletcher

Team information
- Colors: Maroon and Gold
- Founded: 1861 (Fitzroy Cricket Club)
- Home ground: Schramms Reserve

History
- 1st XI Two Day wins: 10
- 1st XI One Day wins: 1 (2015-16)
- 1st XI T20 Cup wins: 0
- Other XI Wins wins: 13
- Official website: fitzroydoncastercc.com.au

The Fitzroy Doncaster Cricket Club, nicknamed the Lions, play cricket in the elite club competition of Melbourne, Australia, known as Victorian Premier Cricket. The club was formed by a 1986 amalgamation of Fitzroy Cricket Club, a foundation member of Victorian Premier Cricket in 1905, and Doncaster Cricket Club, a Victorian Sub-District Association team formed in 1864. The Lions play at Schramms Reserve in Doncaster.

== Honours ==
=== Club Championships ===
- 1939/40
- 1957/58
- 1960/61
- 1961/62
- 2017/18

=== Premierships ===
Premierships and Runners-up for all the clubs elevens since the clubs induction into the VCA in 1906.

Team	Two-day		One-Day		T20	
Team	Premiers	Runners-up	Premiers	Runners-up	Premiers	Runners-up
Firsts	10	1	1	0	0	1
Seconds	3	0	1	0	0	0
Thirds	9	0	0	0	0	0
Fourths	0	0	1	0	0	0

==== Two Day Premierships ====
- 1st XI – 1930/31, 1938/39, 1939/40, 1953/54, 1960/61, 1966/67, 1993/94, 2001/02, 2015/16, 2016/17
- 2nd XI – 1909/10, 1934/35, 2007/08, 2013/14, 2024/25 2025/26
- 3rd XI – 1954/55, 1960/61, 1961/62, 1962/63, 1967/68, 1968/69, 1970/71, 2001/02

==== One Day Premierships ====
- 1st XI – 1993/94 (CUB Shield – No Final Played), 2015–16
- 2nd XI – 2003/04, 2010/11
- 4th XI – 2010/11

== Player Honours ==
=== Club Legends ===
Player	Career		Batting					Bowling				Fielding
Player	Career	Matches	Innings	Not Outs	Runs	Average	High Score	Wickets	Runs	Average	Best Bowling	Catches/Stumpings
Arthur Liddicut	1914-1937	237	229	43	6585	35.40	132*	542	9266	17.09	8/26	89
Ray Harvey	1941-1961	247	290	38	9146	36.29	205*	217	4553	20.98	6/43	183
Eddie Illingworth	1957-1978	233	218	28	2666	14.03	61*	599	11144	18.60	8/18	91

=== Hall of Fame ===
The Hall of Fame was announced at the club's 150 Year anniversary dinner celebrated in 2013. Eligible players had to adhere to the following criteria in order to qualify:

- Players had retired from playing at least five years.
- Players had to have played at least 100 games, including representative games.
- In the case of a batsman a minimum of 4500 runs was achieved.
- In the case of a bowler a minimum of 300 wickets were taken.
- In the case of an all-rounder a points system was used.

Player	Career		Batting					Bowling				Fielding
Player	Career	Matches	Innings	Not Outs	Runs	Average	High Score	Wickets	Runs	Average	Best Bowling	Catches/Stumpings
Ted McDonald	1912–1930	89	95	5	1338	14.86	101	360	5542	15.39	9/47	44
Merv Harvey	1933–1955	207	238	12	6602	29.21	166*	21	560	26.66	4/78	94
Neil Harvey	1943–1957	104	117	8	4044	37.10	254	3	135	45.00	1/0	34
Bill Jacobs	1937–1956	265	255	74	2765	15.27	100*	2	55	27.50	2/24	269/179
Jack Potter	1954–1968	95	110	20	3609	40.10	170	21	619	29.47	5/25	69
Gary Watts	1975–2001	322	344	38	12933	42.26	260*	8	461	57.62	3/43	129/3
Leigh Watts	1981–2000	201	262	38	6889	30.75	131*	155	4534	29.25	7/59	100
Brendan Joyce	1989–2004	216	223	34	7442	39.37	155	2	86	43.00	1/12	73
Bernie Considine	1946-1959	117	87	26	363	5.95	28*	242	4650	19.21	6/17	23
Tim Considine	1979-1989	131	100	18	1069	13.03	58	247	6045	24.47	6/51	23

=== International Representatives ===
Players who have represented their country and have also played for the Fitzroy Doncaster Cricket Club.

- Neil Harvey
- Rob Bailey
- Roshan Mahanama
- John Stephenson
- Dirk Nannes
- Glenn Maxwell
- Alex Hales

=== Victorian Representatives ===
Players who have represented the Victorian Bushrangers and have also played for the Fitzroy Doncaster Cricket Club.

- John Scholes
- Gary Watts
- Darren Berry
- Lloyd Mash
- Dirk Nannes
- Glenn Maxwell
- Sam Elliott

== Club ==
=== Club song ===
We are the boys from old Fitzroy,
We wear the colours maroon and gold,
We will always strive for victory,
We will be both strong and bold.
Win or lose we do or die,
And in defeat we always try,
Fitzroy Fitzroy the team we love so dear,
Premiers we'll be this year.

=== Harvey Watts Development Academy ===
The Harvey-Watts Development Squad was established in 2004. Its objective is to immerse up-and-coming cricketers in a Premier Cricket environment. It was aptly named after two of the most prolific and successful families of the Fitzroy and Fitzroy-Doncaster Cricket Clubs.

== Records ==
=== Club records ===
	Record	Opposition	Year
Highest score for	4/457	Dandenong	1994/95
Highest score against	2 dec. 744	East Melbourne	1902/3
	6/455	St Kilda	1994/95
Lowest score for	30	Carlton	1971/2
Lowest score against	13	Carlton	1899/1900

=== Batting records ===
	Player	Record
Highest aggregate – career	G. M. Watts	12,052
Highest aggregate – season	B. A. Joyce	958 (2001/02)
Highest individual score	G. M. Watts	260* vs Dandenong (1994/95)

=== Partnership records ===
Wkt	Runs	Batsmen	Versus	Season
1	216	C. McKenzie (123) and C. Kiernan (121)	Essendon	1911/12
2	278	M. Bremner (122) and P. Dickson (162)	Camberwell Magpies	2011/12
3	259*	J. W. Scaife (172*) and L. A. Wynne (109*)	North Melbourne	1933/34
4	242	J. Potter (170) and D. J. Anderson (78)	Hawthorn East Melbourne	1967/68
5	204	C. J. Dart (177) and D. Martin (84)	North Melbourne	1968/69
6	166	D. R. Plumpton (103*) and Hague (86)	Ringwood	1997/98
7	140*	E. Tait (103*) and G. Brosnan (57*)	Northcote	1919/20
8	166	W. Carkeek (80) and L. Cogle (81*)	South Melbourne	1899/1900
9	166	J. Travaglia (68) and B. Waterman (102*)	Melbourne University	2003/04
10	107	L. A. Childs (104) and S. Street (10*)	Camberwell Magpies	1999/2000

=== Bowling records ===
	Player	Record
Highest aggregate – career	E. P. Illingworth	599
Highest aggregate – season	C. B. D. Street	67 wickets at 14.63 (2002/03)
Best analysis – innings	M. W. Sievers	9/34 vs Melbourne (1941/42)
	H. A. E. Shillinglaw	9/38 vs Prahran (1953/54)
Best analysis – match	A. E. Liddicut	14/49 (8/26 and 6/23) vs Prahran (1929/30)

=== Wicketkeeping records ===
	Player	Record
Most dismissals – career	W. L. Jacobs	448 (279 ct 169 st)
Most dismissals – season	P. J. Roach	46 (44 ct 2 st) 2005–06
Most dismissals – innings	W. L. Jacobs	6 (4 ct 2 st) v. St K. 1939/40
	J. B. Kline	6 (6 ct) v. St. K. 1989/90
Most dismissals – match	L Banthorpe	8 (7 ct 1 st) v. Greenvale 2017/8
	B. A. Kline	7 (4 ct 3 st) v. N. Melb. 1960/1 (SF)
	W. L. Jacobs	7 (4 ct 3 st) v. N. Melb. 1940/1
	W. L. Jacobs	7 (4 ct 3 st) v. H.E.M. 1939/40
	W. L. Jacobs	7 (5 ct 2 st) v. St K. 1951/2(SF)
	W. L. Jacobs	7 (1 ct 6 st) v. Ess. 1941/42

=== Twenty20 records ===
	Record	Opposition	Year
Highest score for	5/192	St. Kilda	2010/11
Highest score against	4/209	Dandenong	2008/09
Lowest score for	9/76	Prahran	2010/11
Lowest score against	66	St Kilda	2010/11
Highest individual score	Lloyd Mash – 88* off 42 balls	Frankston Peninsula	2008/09
Best bowling	Steven Duckworth – 4/9	St Kilda	2010/11

=== 1st XI Honour Roll ===
Season	Batting	Bowling
1986–87	G Watts	L Watts
1987–88	G Watts	T Considine
1988–89	R Watts	L Watts
1989–90	L Watts	C McKissack
1990–91	I Wheeler	M Ridgway
1991–92	G Watts	M Ridgway
1992–93	G Watts	M Ridgway
1993–94	L Watts	D Hampton
1994–95	L Watts	D Hampton
1995–96	B Joyce	A Melbourne
1996–97	G Watts	A Muir
1997–98	D Plumpton	L Childs
1998–99	G Watts	J Renkin
1999-2000	G Watts	C Street
2000–01	B Joyce	L Childs
2001–02	D Plumpton	C Street
2002–03	B Joyce	C Street
2003–04	D Plumpton	B Waterman
2004–05	L Mash	B Waterman
2005–06	L Mash	J Fagg
2006–07	P Dickson	J Fagg
2007–08	P Dickson	J Fagg
2008–09	P Dickson	G Maxwell
2009–10	L Mash	B Waterman
2010–11	G Maxwell	B Waterman
2011–12	P Dickson	J Fagg
2012–13	L Mash	P Dickson
2013–14	T Sheehan	S Duckworth
2014–15	M Frith	A Perrin
2015–16	P Dickson	A Perrin
2016–17	L Mash	T Lawford
2017–18		

== Grounds ==
=== Schramms Reserve ===
Schramms Reserve is the Home of the Lions, also known as "The Lions' Den". In 1993/94 the Main Oval was voted the best ground in Premier Cricket, while the bottom ground was awarded the same honour in 1993/94, 1994/95 and 1998/99.

=== Brunswick Street Oval ===
The Brunswick Street Oval, currently known as WT Peterson Community Oval, also known as the Fitzroy Cricket Ground, is a cricket and Australian rules football ground located in Edinburgh Gardens in Fitzroy North, Victoria. The ground was the home of Fitzroy Cricket Club up until its amalgamation 1986 with the Doncaster Cricket Club, Fitzroy Football Club in the VFA from 1883 to 1897, and the home of the club in the VFL from 1897 until 1966, with the last game being played there on Saturday 20 August 1966 against St Kilda, a game which the Lions lost by 84 points.

== Admin ==
Season	President	Secretary	Treasurer	Coach
1986–87	A Magee	K Kearney	F Cahill	G Watts
1987–88	R Wood	K Kearney	N Craven	G Watts
1988–89	R Wood	K Kearney	N Craven	W Scholes
1989–90	R Wood	K Kearney	N Craven	W Scholes
1990–91	M Smith	K Kearney	N Craven	W Scholes
1991–92	M Smith	K Kearney	N Craven	W Scholes
1992–93	M Smith	K Kearney	J Brock	W Scholes
1993–94	M Smith	K Kearney	J Brock	W Scholes
1994–95	M Smith	K Kearney	J Brock	W Scholes
1995–96	M Smith	K Kearney	M Catanzariti	W Scholes
1996–97	M Smith	K Kearney	M Catanzariti	L Watts
1997–98	M Smith	K Kearney	M Catanzariti	L Watts
1998–99	M Smith	K Kearney	M Catanzariti	G Gardiner
1999-2000	M Smith	E Taylor	S Dalton	G Gardiner
2000–01	M Smith	E Taylor	S Dalton	L Watts
2001–02	M Smith	E Taylor	F Cahill	S Helmot
2002–03	M Smith	M Turner	F Cahill	S Helmot
2003–04	M Smith	M Turner	F Cahill	S Helmot
2004–05	R Kelly	M Turner	F Cahill	K Hannam
2005–06	R Kelly	M Turner	F Cahill	K Hannam
2006–07	R Kelly	M Turner	F Cahill	C Reidy
2007–08	R Kelly	M Turner	F Cahill	C Reidy
2008–09	R Kelly	M Turner	F Cahill	A Walton
2009–10	T Considine	M Turner	F Cahill	A Walton
2010–11	T Considine	M Turner	F Cahill	L Mash
2011–12	T Considine	M Turner	F Cahill	L Mash
2012–13	T Considine	M Turner	F Cahill	L Mash
2013–14	G Cook	M Duckworth	A Steenberg	L Mash
2014–15	G Cook	M Duckworth	A Steenberg	M O'Sullivan
2015–16	G Cook	A Barrow	A Steenberg	M O'Sullivan
2016–17	G Cook	A Barrow	A Steenberg	M O'Sullivan
2017–18	G Cook	A Barrow	A Steenberg	M O'Sullivan
