= Ringwood Cricket Club =

The Ringwood Cricket Club is a cricket club based in Ringwood, in the outer eastern suburbs of Melbourne, Australia. It fields four sides in Victorian Premier Cricket The club was founded in 1901

== Premierships ==
The club has won 15 Victorian Premier Cricket premierships across all grades, and 2 club championship (2008/09 & 2009/10)

Ringwood won their first top grade premiership in 2007/08 after 34 years in the competition with a 138 run win over Geelong at St Kilda Cricket Ground. They made it back to back premierships by defeating Carlton by 7 wickets outright at Melbourne Uni in 2008/09 final. They also became the first side to win back to back premierships with the same team (same 11 in both years). Six years later, Ringwood defeated the Monash Tigers by 163 runs to win its third top grade premiership.

- 1st XI Premiers (3; 2007/08, 2008/09, 2014/15)
- 2nd XI Premiers (1)
- 3rd XI Premiers (4)
- 4th XI Premiers (7)

The club has also won various other premierships in the Ringwood & District Cricket Association, Victorian Sub-District Cricket Association and Eastern Cricket Association (formerly Eastern Suburbs Cricket Association).

== Individual honours ==
The club has had a player win the Ryder Medal (highest individual honour in Victorian Premier Cricket for 1st XI players) as well as having players honoured as 'player of the season' in the 2nd and 4th XIs. In 2007/08 the club had a player win the John Scholes Medal for Player of the Final and again in 2008/09 season.

Ryder Medals:
(2; Darren Dempsey 2000/01, Ian Holland 2014/15, David King (2019/20)

John Scholes Medals:
(3; Michael King 2007/08, Steven Gilmour 2008/09, Ian Holland 2014/15)

Player of the Year:
2nd XI: (3; Mark Freeman 1992/93, Matt King 2006/07, Jackson Freeman 2012/13)
3rd XI: (1; Chris O'Brien 2010/11) 4th XI: (3; Jamie Barnett 2005/06, Chris O'Brien 2008/9, Sam Wade 2012/13)

Future Star Award:
(1; David King 2008/9)
