= Greenvale Cricket Club =

- One Day name: Kangaroos

Team information
- Home ground: Greenvale Recreational Reserve

History
- 1st XI 2 Day wins: 0
- 1st XI One Day wins: 0
- 1st XI T20 Cup wins: 0
- Official website: http://www.greenvalekangaroos.com.au/

Greenvale Cricket Club is an Australian cricket team competing in the Victorian Premier Cricket competition.

The club began as the Hotham Cricket Club, and changed to the North Melbourne Cricket Club in September 1887 to reflect the change to the name of the district. It played in the Victorian Cricket Association pennant competition in the 19th century, and was one of the inaugural district cricket clubs in 1906/07. It played its home games at the North Melbourne Cricket ground (better known as the Arden Street Oval) in North Melbourne for many years.

In 1985/86, North Melbourne entered a trial amalgamation with the sub-district Geelong Cricket Club, which lasted for three seasons. Geelong has since established a premier cricket team in its own right.

In 2013, North Melbourne merged with turf cricket's Greenvale Cricket Club, to become the Greenvale Kangaroos. The club moved to the Greenvale Recreation Reserve in Greenvale from the 2013/14 season.

The club enjoyed most of its success in the pre-district era, and won V.C.A. first XI pennants in the 1893/94, 1895/96 and 1902/03 seasons. It has not achieved success since the establishment of district cricket in 1906/07, having failed to win a Men's First XI premiership in any format since that time; it and Frankston Peninsula, which joined the competition during the 1990s, are the only current clubs with this distinction.
