= Wayne N. Phillips =

Australian cricketer (born 1962)

Wayne Phillips
Cricket information
- Batting: Right-handed
- Bowling: Right-arm off-break

International information
- National side: Australia
- Only Test (cap 351): 1 February 1992 v India

Career statistics
Competition	Test	First-class
Matches	1	60
Runs scored	22	3,859
Batting average	11.00	38.59
100s/50s	0/0	9/18
Top score	14	205
Balls bowled	–	246
Wickets	–	1
Bowling average	–	124.00
5 wickets in innings	–	0
10 wickets in match	–	0
Best bowling	–	1/59
Catches/stumpings	0/–	24/–
- Source: Cricinfo, 28 June 2018

Wayne Norman Phillips (born 7 November 1962) is a former Australian cricketer. A right-handed batsman, he played first-class cricket for Victoria from 1988 to 1994. He has a single Test cap for the match against India at Perth in February 1992.

Relatively short in stature, Phillips was a gritty, persistent customer at the batting crease in contrast to some of the emerging expansive players, who would ultimately succeed him in the Australian team. A player against pace bowling, Phillips batted in the top order, usually opening.

Following a successful season for South Melbourne Cricket Club in 1987/88 in which he won the Ryder Medal and some strong form for the Victorian 2nd XI, Phillips made his first class debut for Victoria against the touring West Indians. Batting at number four he showed his prowess against a strong pace bowling attack comprising Patrick Patterson, Ian Bishop and Winston Benjamin to score 111.

Another century followed against the touring Sri Lankans in 1989/90, however in the Sheffield Shield the Victorian team again struggled, finishing last for the second consecutive year. Phillips briefly found his way out of the side part way through the following season but was soon restored to a revitalised Victorian line up which topped the table and thus hosted the final at the MCG. Set 239 to win a tense, low scoring encounter against New South Wales, Phillips, opening the batting saw two quick wickets fall but in one of his finest innings combined with Jamie Siddons to take Victoria to the title without further loss. Phillips' contribution: a brave, undefeated 91 from 254 balls.

Such a fine knock under pressure combined with an early season century against South Australia in 1991/92 saw Phillips selected for an Australian XI side to play a first-class match against the touring West Indians. Opening with David Boon, he scored 51 as the Australian XI won by an innings.

With Australian vice-captain Geoff Marsh struggling for form in the Test series against India, Phillips was selected for the fifth Test match in his place. Captain Allan Border was furious with the decision to axe his deputy and that the Test was to be played at Marsh's home ground of the WACA only added to the drama. Phillips scored 8 and 14, and never played another Test match.

Nevertheless, Phillips continued scoring runs for Victoria, his highest score – a marathon 205 from 495 balls – followed in early 1992/93 against New South Wales, and ensured he was again selected for the annual "Australian XI" match where he opened with Matthew Hayden. By this time the likes of Hayden, Michael Slater and Justin Langer were emerging and Phillips was never seriously considered for further Australian duty. During his final season for Victoria of 1993/94 Phillips added two further centuries and also captained the side for a couple of matches. He subsequently continued to represent South Melbourne with distinction for several years.
