= Punt Road Oval =

Australian rules football venue

- The venue during redevelopment in 2026
- Interactive map of Punt Road Oval
- Former names: Richmond Cricket Ground; ME Bank Centre
- Address: Punt Road; East Melbourne, Victoria
- Coordinates: 37°49′20″S 144°59′16″E
- Owner: City of Melbourne
- Operator: Richmond Football Club
- Capacity: 2,800

Construction
- Groundbreaking: 1855; 171 years ago
- Opened: 1856; 170 years ago

Tenants
- Richmond Football Club Administration & Training (1885–present); VFL/AFL (1908–1964); VFL (2014–present); VFLW (2018–2019); AFLW (2021–present) Other Teams Richmond Cricket Club (CV) (1856–2011); Melbourne Football Club (VFL/AFL) (1942–1946; 1956); Western Bulldogs (AFLW) (2022)

Ground information

International information
- Only women's Test: 9 February 1991: Australia v India
- First women's ODI: 11 December 1988: Australia v England
- Last women's ODI: 17 December 1988: Australia v New Zealand
- As of 8 September 2020; Source: CricketArchive

Punt Road Oval (also known as the Richmond Cricket Ground or under naming rights as the Swinburne Centre) is an Australian rules football and former cricket venue located within the Yarra Park precinct of East Melbourne, Victoria, Australia, situated a few hundred metres to the east of the Melbourne Cricket Ground (MCG).

The oval is a former venue of the Victorian Football League (now Australian Football League), with 544 VFL/AFL premiership matches played there between 1908 and 1964. The venue is the training and administrative headquarters of the Richmond Football Club, and also hosts the club's reserves and women's premiership matches.

== History ==
In October 1855, an application was made for the Richmond Cricket Club to play matches on the Richmond paddock next to the site occupied by the Melbourne Cricket Club. The first documented cricket match on the oval was played on 27 December 1856. The venue remained the home ground for the Richmond Cricket Club until the end of the 2010/11 season. In 2011/12, the club moved to Central Reserve in Glen Waverley.

It was used as the home ground by the Richmond Football Club in the Victorian Football Association (VFA) from 1885 to 1907 then in the Victorian Football League (VFL) from 1908 to 1964. It was also used by the Melbourne Football Club during and immediately after World War II, when the MCG became a military base. Not until late 1946 were Melbourne able to play the MCG again. In round 4 of the 1956 season, Melbourne played a one off home game at Punt Road against Fitzroy, this time due to renovations at the MCG in preparation for the 1956 Summer Olympics. Owing to the arrangement of the draw for 1942, South Melbourne played one home game there against Hawthorn when Richmond had the bye.

After the 1964 season, the capacity of the venue was to be reduced to only 22,000, after much of the outer was to be lost to the widening by 50 ft of Punt Road, a notorious traffic bottleneck. Under the stewardship of President Ray Dunn, Richmond negotiated to move its home games to the Melbourne Cricket Ground starting from 1965. The last senior VFL game was played at the venue on 22 August 1964, between Richmond and Hawthorn, where Richmond was beaten by 43 points. The club retained the venue as its training and administrative base, despite moving its home games.

In November 1999 it hosted a Mercantile Mutual Cup match between Victoria and A.C.T.

== Ground records (VFL/AFL) ==
- Most Goals (Individual) in a Match: 14 by Doug Strang (Richmond vs North Melbourne, Round 2 1931)
- Highest Score: 199 (Richmond 30.19 (199) def. North Melbourne 4.7 (31), Round 2 1931)
- Lowest Score: 16 (Richmond 8.6 (54) def. St Kilda 1.10 (16), Round 15 1910)
- Greatest Winning Margin: 168 (Richmond 30.19 (199) def. North Melbourne 4.7 (31), Round 2 1931)
- Drawn Matches: 6
- Record attendance: 46,000 (Richmond vs Carlton, Round 9 1949)

NB: In 2017, Richmond's reserves team exceeded the above record for highest score and winning margin - Richmond 33.21 (219) def. North Ballarat 4.7 (31) - in Round 1 of the VFA/VFL.

== Modern use ==
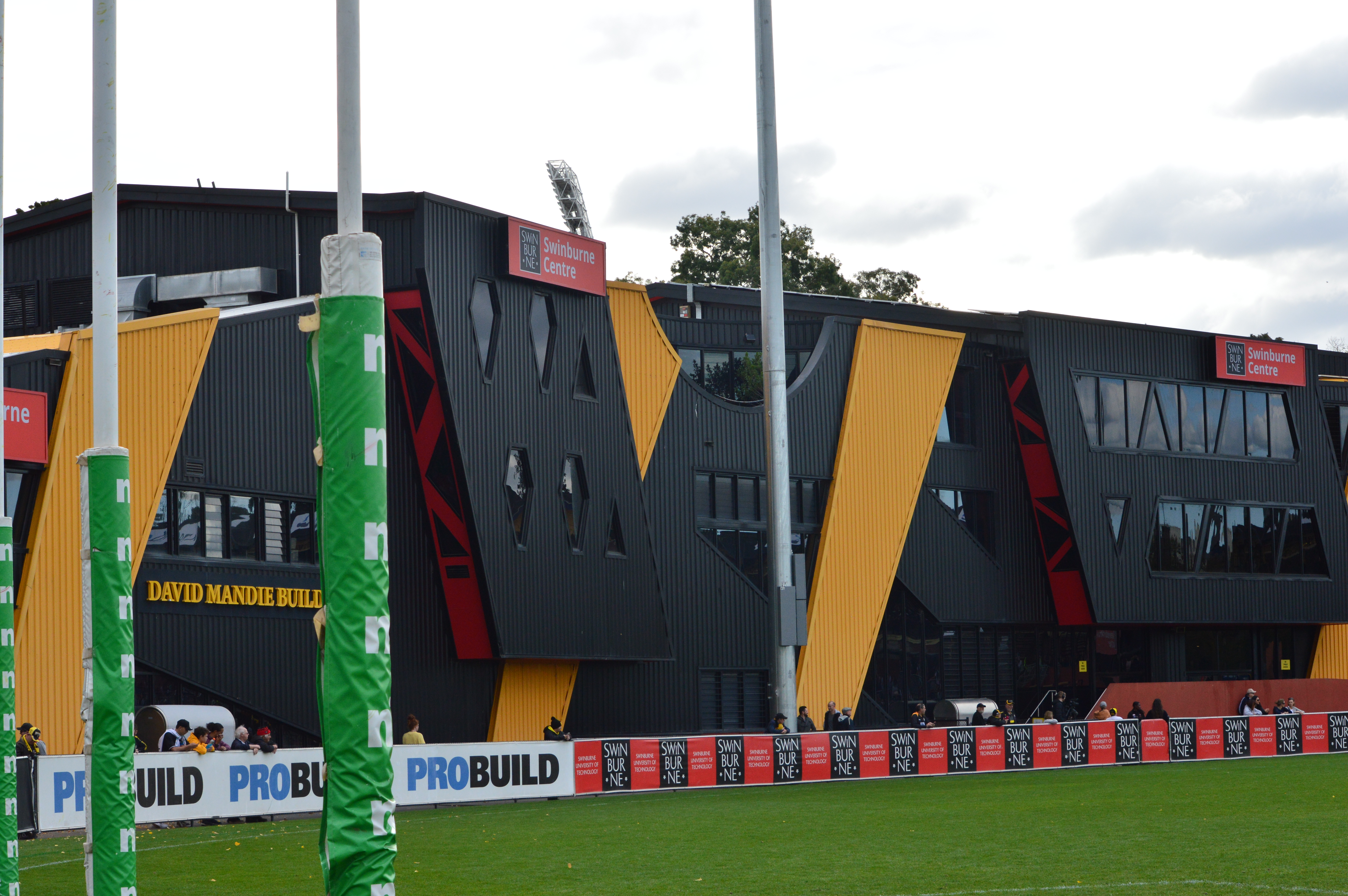
The David Mandie building, built in 2011 and home to Richmond's AFL team and club administration staff

The ground is still used for training by the Richmond Football Club and it remains the club's administrative headquarters. A statue of Tigers legend Jack Dyer is outside the ground. A $20 million redevelopment was completed in 2011. The redeveloped sports facilities at Punt Road Oval accommodate a range of business and community sports organisations, including Klim Swim, the VRI Fencing Club and the Indigenous Youth Education Centre known as the Korin Gamaji Institute.

The naming rights for the ground were then sold to ME Bank. In 2017 it was commercially re-branded as the Swinburne Centre at Punt Road Oval.

Since being re-established in 2014, the Richmond reserves team has played its VFL home games at the venue. The club's VFL Women's team, which began playing in 2018 though was dissolved at the end of the following season, also played home matches at the venue. The Richmond senior women's team, of the AFL Women's competition, played their first home match at Punt Road on 31 January 2021, after playing the previous season home matches at the larger capacity Princes Park in Carlton.

When Richmond defeated Adelaide in the 2017 Grand Final to win their first flag in 37 years, the venue hosted an official Richmond viewing party that attracted 15,000 people.

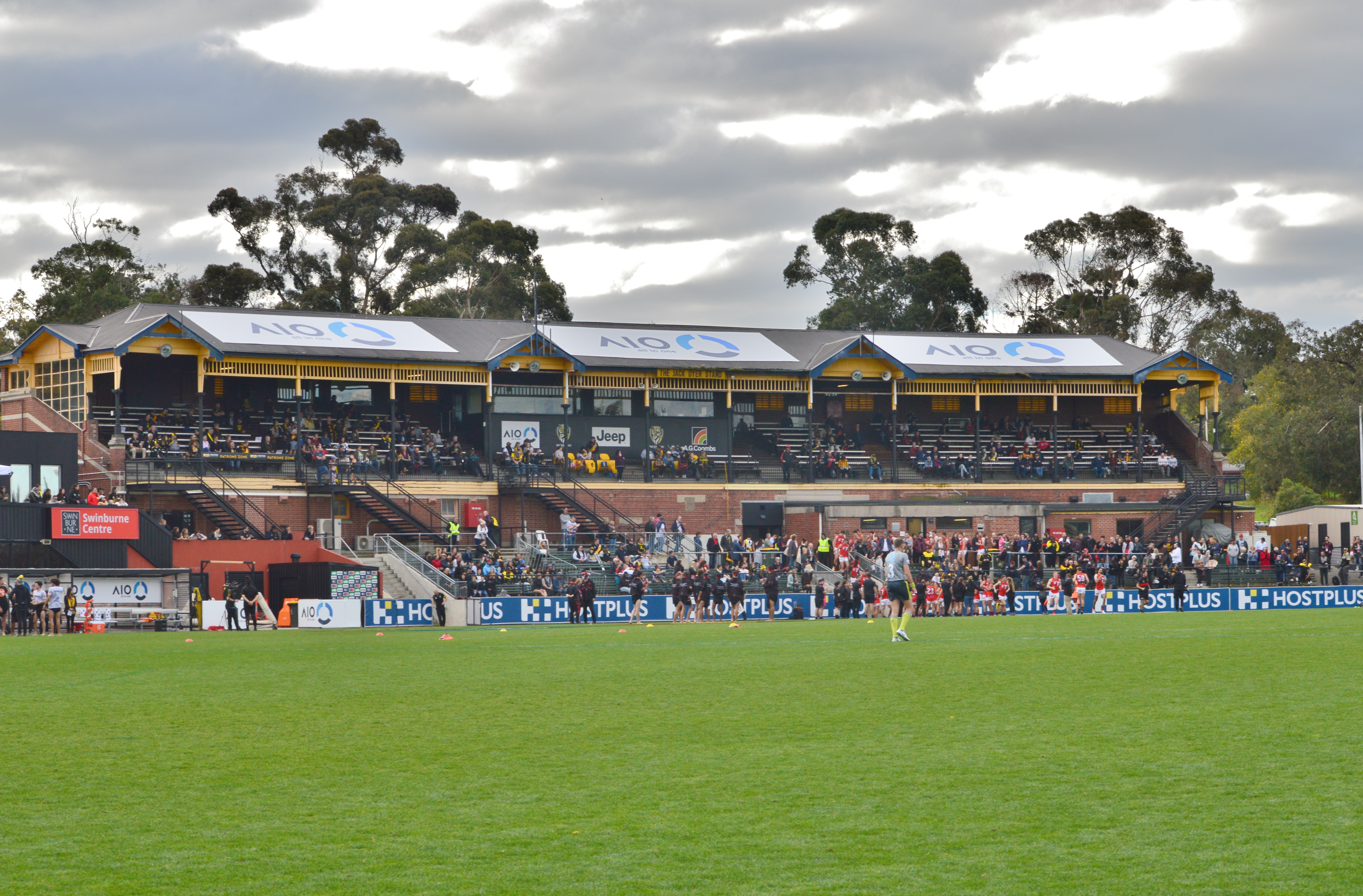
The Jack Dyer Stand pictured in May 2019, prior to demolition in August 2025

In November 2020, the Richmond Football Club announced its intention to redevelop the venue. The plans included a larger playing surface, demolishing the historic Jack Dyer Stand to make way for a new grandstand with public seating and amenities, and construction of additional playing facilities and a function space. Initially valued at $60 million, the redevelopment received approximately half the necessary funding from the Victorian and Australian governments, with the remaining amount needing to be raised the AFL, club members and benefactors.

One year later, the club unveiled the designs and schematics for the proposal, with the new stand situated on the carpark and featuring two levels of seating, including some undercover, boosting the ground's capacity to 8,000. In addition the designs included enhanced facilities for players, function and community spaces and underground carparking for 280 vehicles.

Demolition of the grandstand and subsequent construction of the new facility commenced in mid-2025, and is expected to conclude by late 2027. At this point the cost of the upgrade increased to $85 million, as the club explored options to raise an additional $25 million to fund a second facility located adjacent to the grandstand, which would house a new space for community programs and administrative offices.
