= Prahran Cricket Club =

Cricket team in Victoria, Australia

The Prahran Cricket Club is an Australian cricket club based in Prahran, an inner-city suburb of Melbourne, Victoria. They play in Victorian Premier Cricket, the highest competition in the state. The club was originally known as Hawksburn Cricket Club, being founded in 1879. The club plays its home matches at Toorak Park in Armadale.

== International players from Prahran ==
- Sam Loxton
- Chris Rogers
- David Hussey
- Bryce McGain
