= Casey-South Melbourne Cricket Club =

Australian cricket club

The Casey-South Melbourne Cricket Club is a cricket club located in the outer south-eastern Melbourne suburb of Cranbourne East, which plays in the Victorian Premier Cricket competition. Founded in 1862 as South Melbourne, it has produced nine Australian Test captains, more than any other cricket club in Australia. 47 international players have represented the club, eight of whom have been listed as a Wisden “Cricketer of the Year”.

The club played at the South Melbourne Cricket Ground in Albert Park until 1994, when the ground was redeveloped into a soccer stadium. At this point, the club considered merging with St Kilda, but this proposal was voted down by the members and instead the club moved onto the Harry Trott Oval, also located in Albert Park. Over the following decade, the club's finances waned and it was frustrated by the poor quality of the ground and a poor relationship with Parks Victoria; so, in 2005–06, the club relocated to the outer suburban Casey Fields, and it was renamed to reflect its new home.

The First XI has been Victoria's premier club on seven occasions: in the pre-district era 1872–73, 1878–79, 1888–89, 1891–92; and in the district era 1952–53, 1959–60 and 1967–68.

The club's team of the 20th century includes five players who captained Australia and three others who captained state teams:

- Lindsay Hassett (Captain)
- Bill Woodfull
- Ian Redpath
- Harry Trott
- Graham Yallop
- Keith Miller
- Ian Johnson
- Cyril Parry
- Damien Fleming
- Clarrie Grimmett
- Alan Connolly

(12th man: Wayne N. Phillips)
