= Peter Cox (cricketer) =

Australian cricketer (born 1954)

Personal information
- Born: 13 January 1954 (age 72); Mildura, Australia

Domestic team information
- Years: Team
- 1978-1983: Victoria
- Source: Cricinfo, 6 December 2015

Peter Cox (born 13 January 1954) is an Australian former cricketer. He played ten first-class cricket matches for Victoria between 1978 and 1983.

== See also ==
- List of Victoria first-class cricketers
