= Cyril Parry (cricketer) =

Australian cricketer (1900–1984)

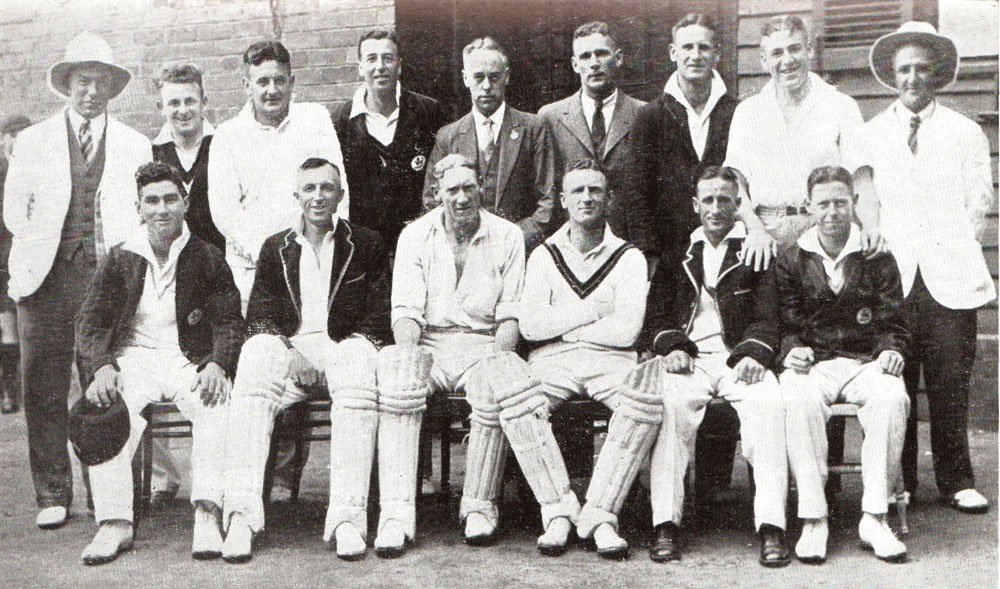
- The Tasmanian cricket team in 1932. Parry is seated second from right.

Personal information
- Full name: Cyril Norman Parry
- Born: 14 October 1900; Queenstown, South Australia, Australia
- Died: 6 July 1984 (aged 83); Melbourne, Australia
- Batting: Right-handed
- Role: Wicket-keeper

Domestic team information
- Years: Team
- 1925–1931: South Australia
- 1931–1934: Tasmania

Career statistics
Competition	First-class
Matches	25
Runs scored	457
Batting average	13.44
100s/50s	0/1
Top score	69
Balls bowled	0
Wickets	–
Bowling average	–
5 wickets in innings	–
10 wickets in match	–
Best bowling	–
Catches/stumpings	31/28
- Source: Cricinfo, 28 August 2016

Cyril Parry (14 October 1900 – 6 July 1984) was an Australian cricketer. He played first-class cricket for South Australia and Tasmania from 1925 to 1934.

== See also ==
- List of South Australian representative cricketers
- List of Tasmanian representative cricketers
