= Victorian Premier Cricket =

Club cricket competition in Victoria, Australia

- Tournament logo
- Administrator: Cricket Victoria
- Format: 2-day matches, 1-day matches, Twenty20
- First edition: 1906–07
- Tournament format: home and away, finals
- Number of teams: 18
- Current champion: St Kilda (2025/26)
- Most successful: 22 Melbourne
- Most runs: (Australia) Warren Ayres (15,277)
- Most wickets: (Australia) Bert Ironmonger (862)

Victorian Premier Cricket is the highest level club cricket competition in the state of Victoria, administered by Cricket Victoria. Each club fields four teams (firsts through to fourths) of adult players and usually play on Saturdays and public holidays. Matches are played on turf wickets. The competition commenced in the 1906–07 season when it was known as "district cricket" with players allocated to their clubs based on residential qualifications. The district qualification has since been removed and competition was renamed in 1990.

Throughout the majority of its history, the competition was played under two-day, two-innings-per-side rules, with most results being decided on a first-innings basis. In the early 21st century, separate competitions under the premier cricket banner were established for one-day matches (2002–03 to 2017–18) and Twenty20 (2005–06 to 2013–14). These have since been combined, and there is now a single premier cricket competition which features a combination of fixtures in all three formats across the season.

Outstanding players in the competition are selected to play for the Victorian Cricket Team at first-class and List A level, in the Sheffield Shield and Marsh One Day Cup competitions respectively.

== History ==
Inter-club cricket in Melbourne had its beginnings during the 1850s, with matches arranged on an informal basis. The newspapers usually decided the season's best team via the consensus of journalists. In 1870, the Challenge Cup was introduced, beginning an era of more structured competition.

For the 1889–90 season, a program of pennant matches was devised over eight rounds, which began the era of club competition recognisable today. The original competing teams were Carlton, Essendon, East Melbourne, Fitzroy, Melbourne, North Melbourne, Port Melbourne, Richmond, St Kilda, South Melbourne, University and Williamstown. There were no restrictions on the recruitment of players and the stronger clubs (such as East Melbourne, Melbourne and South Melbourne) attracted the leading players, and other teams remained very weak, and the unevenness of the competition resulted in a lack of public support. In 1892–93, the competition split into two divisions; and in 1895–96, it split outright into two competitions when the stronger teams seceded. However, unevenness persisted.

The solution was found in a district cricket scheme, under which players needed a residential qualification to play for their club. In 1903, a VCA sub-committee recommended the implementation of the system. Due to many differences of opinion (most notably, the powerful Melbourne Cricket Club dissented), district cricket did not commence until 1906–07. The eleven inaugural district teams were Carlton, Collingwood (a newly formed club), East Melbourne, Essendon, Fitzroy, Hawksburn (which became Prahran the following year), North Melbourne, Richmond, St Kilda, South Melbourne and University – with Melbourne notably absent, maintaining a senior playing presence under non-district rules, but not part of the premiership. A promotion and relegation system between an A Grade and B Grade was originally envisioned but dispensed with; and the premier club of second grade, Northcote, was promoted for 1907–08, bringing the competition's size to twelve clubs. Melbourne finally joined the competition in 1914–15, under special rules allowing it to draw players from anywhere but with a limit on how many could be drawn from any single other club's district.

The uneven number of teams necessitated a bye, which remained until 1929/30 when the VCA Colts team comprising under-22s across all districts was included. The Colts team competed for eleven seasons but disbanded during World War II. Matches continued through the war (although they were not for points) and Footscray was admitted for 1948–49, which again eliminated the bye.

From the 1970s onwards, there was consistent expansion of the competition into the outer suburbs. This first occurred with the promotion of two clubs representing outer-suburban areas, Ringwood and Waverley, from Sub-District in 1974–75. Eighteen sides have participated since 1993–94 when teams from Geelong and Frankston Peninsula were admitted. Through this period, there were also relocations of almost half of the existing clubs from their original inner-suburban grounds to new outer-suburban homes.

Since 1909–10, the premiership has been decided on the basis of a finals series played after the regular season. This comprised four teams throughout most of its history, before being increased to a final six in 1997–98 season, and later to a final eight.

== Clubs ==
| Colours | Club | Emblem | Formed | Home ground | 1st XI titles | First competed | Note |
|---|---|---|---|---|---|---|---|
| | Camberwell | Magpies | 1906 | Camberwell Sports Ground, Camberwell | 4 | 1906–07 | Inaugural club (Collingwood); amalgamated with Camberwell (Sub-District) in 1996–97 |
| | Carlton | Blues | 1864 | Princes Park, Carlton North | 11 | 1906–07 | Inaugural club |
| | Casey-South Melbourne | Swans | 1862 | Casey Fields, Cranbourne East | 3 | 1906–07 | Inaugural club (South Melbourne), relocated and renamed Casey-South Melbourne in 2005–06 |
| | Dandenong | Panthers | 1908 | Shepley Oval, Dandenong | 3 | 1974–75 | Promoted from Sub-District in 1974–75 as Waverley; amalgamated with and moved to Dandenong (Sub-District) in 1989–90 as Waverley-Dandenong; renamed Dandenong-Waverley in 1992–93; renamed Dandenong in 1994–95 |
| | Essendon | Bombers | 1872 | Windy Hill, Essendon | 2 | 1906–07 | Inaugural club |
| | Fitzroy Doncaster | Lions | 1861 | Schramm's Reserve, Doncaster | 10 | 1906–07 | Inaugural club (Fitzroy); amalgamated with Doncaster (Sub-District) in 1986–87 |
| | Footscray | Bulldogs | 1883 | Merv Hughes Oval, Footscray | 2 | 1948–49 | Promoted from Sub-District in 1948; known as Footscray-Victoria University from 2000-01 until 2003–04, then as Footscray-Edgewater from 2004–05 until 2016–17 |
| | Frankston Peninsula | Heat | 1880 | AH Butler Oval, Frankston | 0 | 1993–94 | Promoted from Sub-District in 1993–94 |
| | Geelong | Cats | 1993 | Kardinia Park, Geelong | 0 | 1993–94 | Promoted from Sub-District in 1993–94 |
| | Greenvale | Kangaroos | 1868 | Greenvale Recreation Reserve, Greenvale | 0 | 1906–07 | Inaugural club (North Melbourne); temporarily amalgamated with Geelong (sub-district) as North Melbourne–Geelong from 1985 to 1986 until 1987–88; amalgamated with and moved to Greenvale in 2013–14 |
| | Kingston Hawthorn | Hawks | 1860 | Walter Galt Reserve, Parkdale | 9 | 1906–07 | Inaugural club (East Melbourne); amalgamated with and moved to Hawthorn (Sub-District) in 1921–22 as Hawthorn-East Melbourne; moved to Waverley in 1989-90 and renamed Hawthorn-Waverley in 1994–95; amalgamated with Monash University (Sub-District) in 2001–02 as Hawthorn-Monash University and moved to the Monash University Sports Complex in Clayton in 2004; amalgamated with Kingston Saints (Sub-District) in 2015–16 and moved to Parkdale as Kingston Hawthorn. |
| | Melbourne | Demons | 1838 | Albert Cricket Ground, Melbourne | 22 | 1906–07 | Inaugural club, but ineligible for the premiership until 1914–15 |
| | Northcote | Dragons | | Bill Lawry Oval, Northcote | 5 | 1907–08 | Promoted from Sub-District 1907–08 |
| | Prahran | True Blues | | Toorak Park, Armadale | 8 | 1906–07 | Inaugural club (Hawksburn); renamed Prahran in 1907–08. |
| | Richmond | Tigers | 1854 | Central Reserve, Glen Waverley | 6 | 1906–07 | Inaugural club (Richmond); relocated to Glen Waverley in 2010–11, and changed its trading name to Monash Tigers from 2013–14 until 2019-20 (although the club was legally still known as Richmond). The 2020/21 season saw the club return to the "Richmond Cricket Club" name |
| | Ringwood | Rams | | Jubilee Park, Ringwood | 3 | 1974–75 | Promoted from Sub-District 1974 |
| | St Kilda | Saints | 1855 | Junction Oval, St Kilda | 20 | 1906–07 | Inaugural club |
| | University | Students | 1856 | University of Melbourne campus, Parkville | 3 | 1906–07 | Inaugural club |

Premierships correct to the end of 2024/25 season.

== First XI premierships ==
Two-day/All forms

- 1906-07 East Melbourne (1)
- 1907-08 East Melbourne (2)
- 1908-09 Prahran (1)
- 1909-10 St Kilda (1)
- 1910-11 Prahran (2)
- 1911-12 Northcote (1)
- 1912-13 Collingwood (1)
- 1913-14 St Kilda (2)
- 1914-15 Melbourne (1)
- 1915-16 Not held Due To WWI
- 1916-17 Not held Due To WWI
- 1917-18 Not held Due To WWI
- 1918-19 Not held Due To WWI
- 1919-20 Melbourne (2)
- 1920-21 Prahran (3)
- 1921-22 Prahran (4)
- 1922-23 Prahran (5)
- 1923-24 St Kilda (3)
- 1924-25 St Kilda (4)
- 1925-26 St Kilda (5)
- 1926-27 St Kilda (6)
- 1927-28 Hawthorn-East Melbourne (3)
- 1928-29 University (1)
- 1929-30 Melbourne (3)
- 1930-31 Fitzroy (1)
- 1931-32 St Kilda (7)
- 1932-33 Melbourne (4)
- 1933-34 St Kilda (8)
- 1934-35 Melbourne (5)
- 1935-36 Melbourne (6)
- 1936-37 Melbourne (7)
- 1937-38 Melbourne (8)
- 1938-39 Fitzroy (2)
- 1939-40 Fitzroy (3)
- 1940-41 Not held Due To WWII
- 1941-42 Not held Due To WWII
- 1942-43 Not held Due To WWII
- 1943-44 Not held Due To WWII
- 1944-45 Not held Due To WWII
- 1945-46 Carlton (1)
- 1946-47 Richmond (1)
- 1947-48 Carlton (2)
- 1948-49 Melbourne (9)
- 1949-50 Hawthorn-East Melbourne (4)
- 1950-51 Hawthorn-East Melbourne (5)
- 1951-52 Melbourne (10)
- 1952-53 South Melbourne (1)
- 1953-54 Fitzroy (4)
- 1954-55 Prahran (6)
- 1955-56 Hawthorn-East Melbourne (6)
- 1956-57 Carlton (3)
- 1957-58 Carlton (4)
- 1958-59 Melbourne (11)
- 1959-60 South Melbourne (2)
- 1960-61 Fitzroy (5)
- 1961-62 St Kilda (9)
- 1962-63 Hawthorn-East Melbourne (7)
- 1963-64 Essendon (1)
- 1964-65 St Kilda (10)
- 1965-66 Northcote (2)
- 1966-67 Fitzroy (6)
- 1967-68 South Melbourne (3)
- 1968-69 Carlton (5)
- 1969-70 Essendon (2)
- 1970-71 Collingwood (2)
- 1971-72 Hawthorn-East Melbourne (8)
- 1972-73 Melbourne (12)
- 1973-74 Northcote (3)
- 1974-75 Collingwood (3)
- 1975-76 Melbourne (13)
- 1976-77 Richmond (2)
- 1977-78 Carlton (6)
- 1978-79 Carlton (7)
- 1979-80 Footscray (1)
- 1980-81 Carlton (8)
- 1981-82 Melbourne (14)
- 1982-83 Richmond (3)
- 1983-84 Prahran (7)
- 1984-85 St Kilda (11)
- 1985-86 St Kilda (12)
- 1986-87 Northcote (4)
- 1987-88 Collingwood (4)
- 1988-89 Melbourne (15)
- 1989-90 Richmond (4)
- 1990-91 University (2)
- 1991-92 St Kilda (13)
- 1992-93 Melbourne (16)
- 1993-94 Fitzroy Doncaster (7)
- 1994-95 Melbourne (17)
- 1995-96 University (3)
- 1996-97 Northcote (5)
- 1997-98 Melbourne (18)
- 1998-99 Hawthorn-Waverley (9)
- 1999-00 Richmond (5)
- 2000-01 St Kilda (14)
- 2001-02 Fitzroy Doncaster (8)
- 2002-03 St Kilda (15)
- 2003-04 St Kilda (16)
- 2004-05 St Kilda (17)
- 2005-06 St Kilda (18)
- 2006-07 Dandenong (1)
- 2007-08 Ringwood (1)
- 2008-09 Ringwood (2)
- 2009-10 Melbourne (19)
- 2010-11 Dandenong (2)
- 2011-12 Richmond (6)
- 2012-13 Melbourne (20)
- 2013-14 Footscray Edgewater (2)
- 2014-15 Ringwood (3)
- 2015-16 Fitzroy Doncaster (9)
- 2016-17 Fitzroy Doncaster (10)
- 2017-18 Dandenong (3)
- 2018-19 Carlton (9)
- 2019-20 Melbourne (21)
- 2020-21 Prahran (8)
- 2021-22 Carlton (10)
- 2022-23 Melbourne (22)
- 2023-24 Carlton (11)
- 2024-25 St Kilda (19)
- 2025-26 St Kilda (20)

One-day/White-ball

- 2002-03 Prahran (1)
- 2003-04 Northcote (1)
- 2004-05 St Kilda (1)
- 2005-06 St Kilda (2)
- 2006-07 St Kilda (3)
- 2007-08 Carlton (1)
- 2008-09 Melbourne (1)
- 2009-10 St Kilda (4)
- 2010-11 Carlton (2)
- 2011-12 Prahran (2)
- 2012-13 Melbourne (2)
- 2013-14 Melbourne (3)}
- 2014-15 Monash Tigers (1)
- 2015-16 Fitzroy Doncaster (1)
- 2016-17 Melbourne (4)
- 2017-18 Dandenong (1)

Twenty-20/White-ball

- 2005-06 Richmond (1)
- 2006-07 Dandenong (1)
- 2007-08 Melbourne (1)
- 2008-09 St Kilda (1)
- 2009-10 Geelong (1)
- 2010-11 Not held
- 2011-12 Prahran (1)
- 2012-13 Melbourne (2)
- 2013-14 Footscray Edgewater (1)

== Ryder Medal ==
First presented in 1972–73, the award for the best player of the season is named after Jack Ryder, the former Australian captain who had a long and distinguished career with Collingwood.

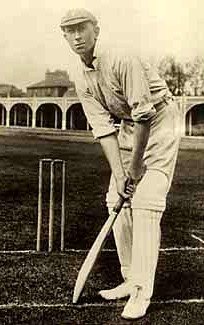
Jack Ryder at the crease

| Season | Player/s | Team/s | Biography link |
|---|---|---|---|
| 1972–73 | Ron Bird | Collingwood | |
| 1973–74 | John Grant | Essendon | |
| 1974–75 | John Grant | Essendon | |
| 1975–76 | Keith Stackpole | Carlton | |
| 1976–77 | John Shepherd | Footscray | |
| 1977–78 | Keith Stackpole | Carlton | |
| 1978–79 | Keith Stackpole | Carlton | |
| 1979–80 | Barry Watson | Footscray | |
| 1980–81 | Gary Cosier | Northcote | |
| 1981–82 | Mick Taylor | South Melbourne | |
| 1982–83 | John Douglas | Carlton | |
| 1983–84 | Trevor Laughlin | Collingwood | |
| 1984–85 | Andrew Wildsmith | Northcote | |
| 1985–86 | Michael Ephraims | Prahran | |
| 1986–87 | Warren Whiteside | St Kilda | |
| 1987–88 | Wayne N. Phillips | South Melbourne | |
| 1988–89 | Richard McCarthy | North Melbourne | |
| 1989–90 | Warren Whiteside | St Kilda | |
| 1990–91 | Warren Whiteside | St Kilda | |
| 1991–92 | Mark Ridgway | Fitzroy/Doncaster | |
| 1992–93 | Mark Leehane | Essendon | |
| 1993–94 | Gary Watts | Fitzroy/Doncaster | |
| 1994–95 | Warren Ayres | Melbourne | |
| 1995–96 | Brendan Joyce | Fitzroy/Doncaster | |
| 1996–97 | Ian Wrigglesworth | Carlton | |
| 1997–98 | PQ Harper | University | |
| 1998–99 | Abdul Qadir | Carlton | |
| 1999–2000 | Carl Hooper | Carlton | |
| 2000–01 (tied) | Paul Collingwood, DM Dempsey | Richmond, Ringwood | |
| 2001–02 | Warren Ayres | Melbourne | |
| 2002–03 | CBD Street | Fitzroy/Doncaster | |
| 2003–04 (tied) | RA Bartlett, Adam Dale | Northcote, North Melbourne | |
| 2004–05 | Simon Dart | Hawthorn/Monash Uni. | |
| 2005–06 (tied) | MD Allen, Graeme Rummans | Carlton, St Kilda | |
| 2006–07 | Graeme Rummans | St Kilda | |
| 2007–08 | Steven Spoljaric | Hawthorn/Monash Uni. | |
| 2008–09 | Gareth Cross | St Kilda | |
| 2009–10 | Graeme Rummans | St Kilda | |
| 2010–11 | Theo Doropoulos | Northcote | |
| 2011–12 | Clive Rose | Casey-South Melbourne | |
| 2012–13 | Brenton McDonald | Melbourne | |
| 2013–14 | James Miller | Prahran | |
| 2014–15 | Ian Holland | Ringwood | |
| 2015–16 | Steve Taylor | Northcote | |
| 2016–17 | Brendan Drew | Camberwell | |
| 2017–18 | Trent Lawford | Fitzroy Doncaster | |
| 2018–19 | Brett Forsyth | Dandenong | |
| 2019-20 (tied) | David King, James Seymour | Ringwood, Essendon | |
| 2020-21 | Scott Edwards | Richmond | |
| 2021-22 | Dean Russ | Footscray | |
| 2022-23 | Harrison Smyth | Carlton | |
| 2023-24 | Brett Forsyth | Dandenong | |
| 2024-25 | David King | Ringwood | |

== John Scholes Medal ==
Presented in season 2001–02 under the name of Cricket Victoria Medal, the John Scholes medal is awarded to the best player in the Victorian Premier Cricket 1st XI final. The name was changed for the 2003–04 season.

| Season | Player | Team |
|---|---|---|
| 2001–02 | JL Travaglia | Fitzroy Doncaster |
| 2002–03 | GC Rummans | St Kilda |
| 2003–04 | GC Rummans | St Kilda |
| 2004–05 | TDB O'Sullivan | St Kilda |
| 2005–06 | M Klinger | St Kilda |
| 2006–07 | PM Boraston | Dandenong |
| 2007–08 | MR King | Ringwood |
| 2008–09 | ST Gilmour | Ringwood |
| 2009–10 | RJ Cooper | Melbourne |
| 2010–11 | JL Pattinson | Dandenong |
| 2011–12 | WD Sheridan | Richmond |
| 2012–13 | Matthew Begbie | Melbourne CC |
| 2013–14 | S Dissanayaka | Footscray-Edgewater |
| 2014–15 | Ian Holland | Ringwood |
| 2015–16 | Peter Dickson | Fitzroy Doncaster |
| 2016–17 | Matthew Brown | Melbourne |
| 2017–18 | Peter Siddle | Dandenong |
| 2018–19 | Evan Gulbis | Carlton |
| 2019–20 | Final not contested due to COVID-19 | Final not contested due to COVID-19 |
| 2020-21 | Damon Egan | Prahran |
| 2021-22 | Thomas Smyth | Carlton |

== See also ==
- Cricket in Australia
- Victorian Sub-District Cricket Association
