= 2018–19 National Premier Twenty20 Championships =

Australian Twenty20 cricket competition

- Dates: 5 March – 6 March 2019
- Administrator: Cricket Australia
- Cricket format: Twenty20
- Tournament format(s): 2 Round League and Finals Series
- Participants: 10
- Matches: 16
- Official website: NPT20.com

The 2018–19 Fox Cricket National Premier Twenty20 Championships is an Australian Twenty20 cricket competition. This was the inaugural addition of the competition. It featured ten teams from the Premier Cricket Twenty20 competitions around Australia. It took place over two days on 5 and 6 March 2019. All matches took place in the Karen Rolton Oval precinct in Adelaide, South Australia.

== Teams ==
=== Qualification ===
The winners from the Australian Capital Territory, Northern Territory, Queensland, South Australian, Tasmanian and Western Australian Premier Cricket Twenty20 competitions qualified for this tournament, as well as the finalists from the New South Wales and Victorian Premier Twenty20 competition.

=== Teams ===
State/Territory	Team
Australian Capital Territory	Tuggeranong Valley
New South Wales	Sutherland Sydney University
Northern Territory	City Cyclones
Queensland	University of Queensland
South Australia	East Torrens
Tasmania	North Hobart
(Victoria (state)) Victoria	Carlton Dandenong
Western Australia	Melville

== Ladder ==
Pos	Team	Pld	W	L	T	NR	NRR	Pts
1	(Western Australia) Melville	1	1	0	0	0	2.95	2
2	(New South Wales) Sydney University	1	1	0	0	0	2.61	2
3	(New South Wales) Sutherland	1	1	0	0	0	2.59	2
4	(Victoria (state)) Dandenong	1	1	0	0	0	1.55	2
5	(Victoria (state)) Carlton	1	1	0	0	0	1.26	2
6	University of Queensland	1	0	1	0	0	-1.26	0
7	(Tasmania) North Hobart	1	0	1	0	0	-1.55	0
8	(Australian Capital Territory) Tuggeranong Valley	1	0	1	0	0	-2.59	0
9	(South Australia) East Torrens	1	0	1	0	0	-2.61	0
10	(Northern Territory) City Cyclones	1	0	1	0	0	-2.95	0

== Fixtures ==
=== Round 1 ===
5 March 2019
10:00

Dandenong (Victoria (state)); 6/141 (20 overs)	v	(Tasmania) North Hobart; 110 (19.4 overs)
Brett Forsyth 38 (33); Jack White 2/13 (3 overs)		Corey Murfet 38 (33); Zachariah Grundmann-Perera 2/7 (2 overs)

Dandenong won by 31 runs
SACA Oval Number 3, Adelaide
Umpires: Jerry Matibiri and Bede Sajowitz

- Dandenong won the toss and elected to bat.

5 March 2019
10:00

East Torrens (South Australia); 7/153 (20 overs)	v	(New South Wales) Sydney University; 2/154 (15 overs)
Michael Cranmer 101* (71); Devlin Malone 3/26 (4 overs)		Hayden Kerr 71* (45); Joel Size 1/20 (2 overs)

Sydney University won by 8 wickets
Karen Rolton Oval, Adelaide
Umpires: Ian Barsby and Mark Donfeld

- Sydney University won the toss and elected to field.

5 March 2019
10:00

University of Queensland; 9/128 (20 overs)	v	(Victoria (state)) Carlton; 3/132 (16.3 overs)
Ben Davis 55 (44); Aaron Smillie 2/16 (3 overs)		Brayden Stepien 46 (36); Devon Endersby 1/20 (2 overs)

Carlton won by 7 wickets
SACA Oval Number 2, Adelaide
Umpires: Chris Grant and Suranga Lekamarachchi

- Carlton won the toss and elected to field.

5 March 2019
10:00

Melville (Western Australia); 5/191 (20 overs)	v	(Northern Territory) City Cyclones; 132 (18.3 overs)
Blake Reed 58 (41); Joshua Doyle 2/33 (4 overs)		Joshua Doyle 40 (21); Thomas Kerr-Sheppard 5/21 (3.3 overs)

Melville won by 59 runs
Adelaide Oval Number 2, Adelaide
Umpires: Sharad Patel and John Sherry

- City Cyclones won the toss and elected to field.

5 March 2019
10:00

Tuggeranong Valley (Australian Capital Territory); 7/156 (20 overs)	v	(New South Wales) Sutherland; 2/158 (15.2 overs)
Timmy Floros 41 (30); Daniel Rixon 2/19 (4 overs)		Jarryd Biviano 103* (51); Craig Devoy 1/31 (3 overs)

Sutherland won by 8 wickets
SACA Oval Number 1, Adelaide
Umpires: Anthony Medina and Eloise Sheridan

- Sutherland won the toss and elected to field.

=== Round 2 ===
5 March 2019
15:30

East Torrens (South Australia)	v	(Tasmania) North Hobart

Adelaide Oval Number 2, Adelaide
Umpires: Jerry Matibiri and Ian Barsby

- East Torrens won the toss and elected to bat.

5 March 2019
15:30

Dandenong (Victoria (state))	v	(Victoria (state)) Carlton

Karen Rolton Oval, Adelaide
Umpires: Anthony Medina and John Sherry

- Dandenong won the toss and elected to bat.

5 March 2019
15:30

Sydney University (New South Wales)	v	University of Queensland

SACA Oval Number 1, Adelaide
Umpires: Sharad Patel and Suranga Lekamarachchi

- University of Queensland won the toss and elected to field.

5 March 2019
15:30

Melville (Western Australia)	v	(Australian Capital Territory) Tuggeranong Valley

SACA Oval Number 3, Adelaide
Umpires: Chris Grant and Mark Donfeld

- Melville won the toss and elected to bat.

5 March 2019
15:30

City Cyclones (Northern Territory)	v	(New South Wales) Sutherland

SACA Oval Number 2, Adelaide
Umpires: Bede Sajowitz and Eloise Sheridan

- Sutherland won the toss and elected to field.

== Finals ==
=== Bracket ===
Semifinals
1
4
2
3

Finals

=== Semi-finals ===
6 March 2019
10:00

1st	v	4th

6 March 2019
10:00

2nd	v	3rd

=== Final ===
6 March 2019
14:30

Carlton	v	University of Queensland

Karen Rolton Oval, Adelaide
