= Warren Ayres =

Australian cricketer (born 1965)

Personal information
- Born: 25 October 1965 (age 61); Melbourne, Australia

Domestic team information
- Years: Team
- 1988-1997: Victoria
- Source: Cricinfo, 9 December 2015

Warren Ayres (born 25 October 1965) is an Australian former cricketer. He played 46 first-class cricket matches for Victoria between 1988 and 1997.

Ayres holds the record for most career runs in the Victorian Premier Cricket competition, scoring 15,277 runs at an average of 42.43 in nineteen seasons for Melbourne and six seasons for Dandenong between 1983/84 and 2007/08.

== See also ==
- List of Victoria first-class cricketers
