= Camberwell Magpies Cricket Club =

Camberwell Magpies Cricket Club is an Australian cricket team competing in the Victorian Premier Cricket competition. The club formed in 1996 from an amalgamation of Collingwood Cricket Club, a foundation member of Victorian Premier Cricket in 1905, and Camberwell Cricket Club, a Victorian Sub-District Association team formed in 1864.

The Magpies play at Camberwell Sports Ground, which was Camberwell Cricket Club's home ground from 1906 to 1907. The ground had a turf wicket laid down in 1908–09 in time for the second season of the Sub-District competition.

Its best known recent player is the former Test batsman Matthew Elliott. Jack Ryder was a great stalwart of the former Collingwood Cricket Club, and also played for Australia.

Prior to the merger the Collingwood Cricket Club had won senior Victorian premierships in 1912–1913, 1970–71, 1974–75 and 1987–88, while Camberwell Cricket Club had won senior premierships in 1907-08 (B.H.R.D.C.A. A Grade), 1920–21, 1921–22, 1948–49, 1961–62, 1982–83 and 1985-86 (V.S.D.C.A. First XI).
