= Dandenong Cricket Club =

The Dandenong Cricket Club is an Australian cricket club based in Dandenong, Victoria, an outer-city suburb of Melbourne. They play in Victorian Premier Cricket, the highest competition in the state.

== History ==
In 1989, Hawthorn/East Melbourne relocated to Glen Waverley in the eastern suburbs, and was later renamed Hawthorn/Waverley in 1994. The move of Hawthorn/East Melbourne caused Waverley to move to Dandenong, and the new team played as Waverley/Dandenong, but dropped Waverley from its name for the 1994–95 season. Dandenong currently use Shepley Oval as their home ground.

The club's most successful season came in 2006/7 when it won its first Premier Cricket Premiership. The side included Peter Siddle, Darren Pattinson and Warren Ayres.

Dandenong won its second flag in 2010/11 vs. Frankston Heat. Siddle, Darren and James Pattinson all played for Dandenong in the final and their individual efforts went a long way to Dandenong claiming the Premiership.

Dandenong won a third premiership in 2017/18, defeating Fitzroy Doncaster in the final, with Siddle named man of the match in the final.

== International players from Dandenong ==
- Peter Siddle
- Darren Pattinson
- Cameron White
- Ian Harvey
- James Pattinson
