= CommSec =

Australian online stockbroking firm

- Type: Subsidiary
- Industry: Financial services
- Founded: 17 July 1995
- Headquarters: Sydney, Australia
- Area served: Australia; New Zealand
- Key people: James Fowle (Executive General Manager)
- Products: CDIA; CommSec Margin Loan; CommSec Pocket
- Parent: Commonwealth Bank
- Website: www.commsec.com.au

Commonwealth Securities Limited, or CommSec, is Australia's largest online stockbroking firm. It is a subsidiary of the Commonwealth Bank.

Though its Internet trading platform constitutes the vast majority of its business, it also offers a telephone based brokerage service, and investment advisory services. In addition, CommSec also offers other peripherally related investment services, such as margin loan and cash accounts.

== History ==
The brokerage arm started operations in 1995 and launched its share trading website in 1997.

CommSec initially offered only Australian equities trades, but has since expanded into derivative products, international equities, managed funds, self-managed super fund (SMSF) administration, contracts-for-difference (CFDs), margin lending and short-term deposits. The firm's large retail customer base has also allowed it to successfully market a number of initial public offering (IPO) fund raisings.

In 2008 CommSec became the first Australian brokerage firm to offer a brokerage website specifically designed for a portable-device. It created CommSec iPhone Edition for the Apple iPhone, the first home-grown iPhone application in Australia. In 2008 the broker disbanded its Share Shops (face-to-face operations) closing the front in the Commonwealth Bank branch in Pitt Street, Sydney, following the earlier closure of the Melbourne Share Shop in Collins Street.

=== Mergers and acquisitions ===
CommSec has retained and increased its already significant market share in retail broking through both CBA's acquisition of other banks and its own acquisition of other broking firms. CommSec now performs broking operations for Colonial First State, TD Waterhouse, AOT, Neville Ward Direct, Auckland Savings Bank (ASB), and IWL (Westpac Broking, Sanford and Avcol). The acquisition of IWL in 2007 gave CommSec significant market share in wholesale broking to complement its existing retail presence.

== Cash management ==
In 2008 CommSec diversified into the short term deposit sector with the introduction of its Cash Management product. The product consists of two distinct accounts the CommSec Cash Account (CCA) and the CommSec Investment Account (CIA). The CCA is the source of funds for stock trading and also an everyday transaction account, with a linked debit Mastercard. The CIA earns interest and cash can only be transferred to and from the CCA.

In December 2012, CommSec announced plans to replace CCA and CIA accounts with a Commonwealth Direct Investment Account (CDIA), which is a settlement account that earns interest.

== See also ==
- List of electronic trading platforms
