= Carlton Cricket Club =

Australian cricket team

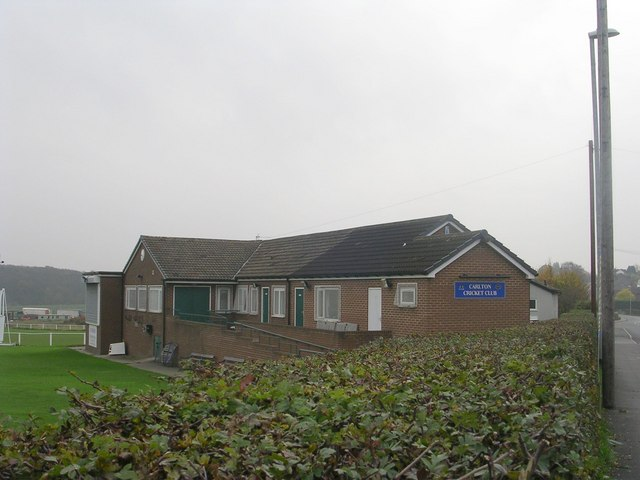

Personnel
- Captain: Evan Gulbis

Team information
- Founded: 1864
- Home ground: Princes Park

History
- 1st XI wins: 11
- Official website: https://carltoncricket.com

Carlton Cricket Club is an Australian cricket team that competes in the Victorian Premier Cricket competition. The club was formed in 1864 and plays its home matches at Princes Park in Carlton North. Known as the Blues, Carlton has won eleven First XI premierships, most recently in the 2023–24 season. Famous past players include Bill Woodfull, Dean Jones, Keith Stackpole, Abdul Qadir and Carl Hooper.

In 2019, it won the inaugural National Premier Twenty20 Championships.

== Honours ==
=== Premierships ===
- 1st XI - 1945/46, 1947/48, 1956/57, 1957/58, 1968/69, 1977/78, 1978/79, 1980/81, 2018/19, 2021/22, 2023/24

== Notable players ==
- Bill Woodfull
- Dean Jones
- Keith Stackpole
- Abdul Qadir
- Carl Hooper
- Julian Pollard
