= St Kilda Cricket Club =

Personnel
- Captain: Ed Newman
- Coach: Glenn Lalor

Team information
- Founded: 1855
- Home ground: Junction Oval

History
- 1st XI wins: 20
- Official website: stkildacricket.com

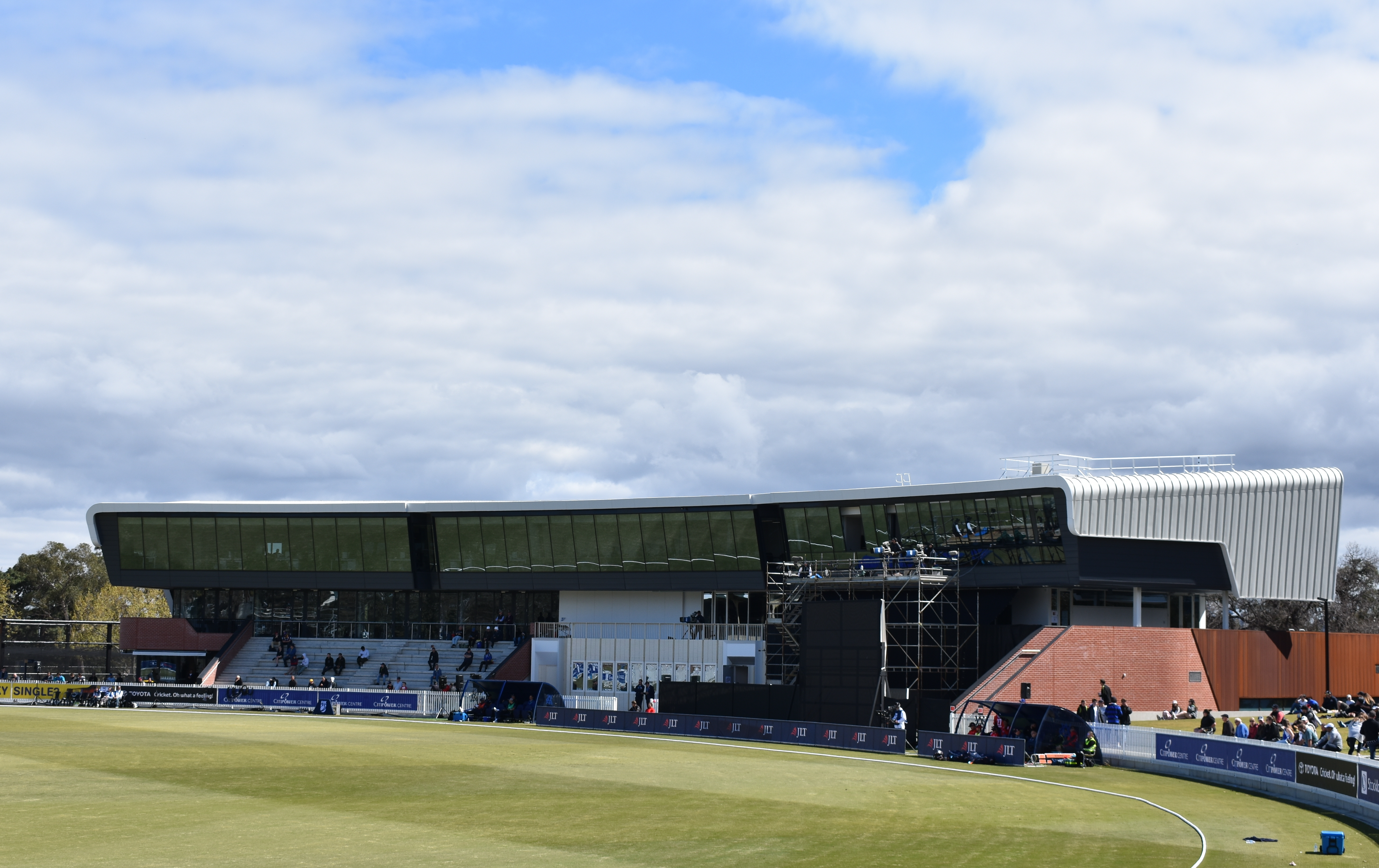
Junction Oval, the club's home ground

St Kilda Cricket Club is a cricket club playing in Victorian Premier Cricket, the elite club cricket competition in Melbourne, Australia.The club's home ground is the St Kilda Cricket Ground, more commonly known as Junction Oval.

== History ==
The club was founded in 1855, beginning as an amateur club.

It played its first season of premier cricket in 1906–07. It is the second-most successful club in the competition with 19 first-XI premierships and 53 premierships across all grades.

The club's colours, as adopted in the 1915/16 season, are red, black and yellow. The colours were previously red, black and white, but they were changed during World War I from those of the enemy German Empire to those of ally Belgium, and were never changed back.

The Saints won their most recent First XI premiership in the 2025/26 season.

== Notable players ==
The club's famous players include:

- Bert Ironmonger
- Jack Hill
- Don Blackie
- Bill Ponsford
- Shane Warne
- Michael Beer
- Rob Quiney
- Peter Handscomb
- Marcus Harris
- Todd Murphy
