= Joe Wilson (Australian footballer) =

Australian sportsman (1870–1912)

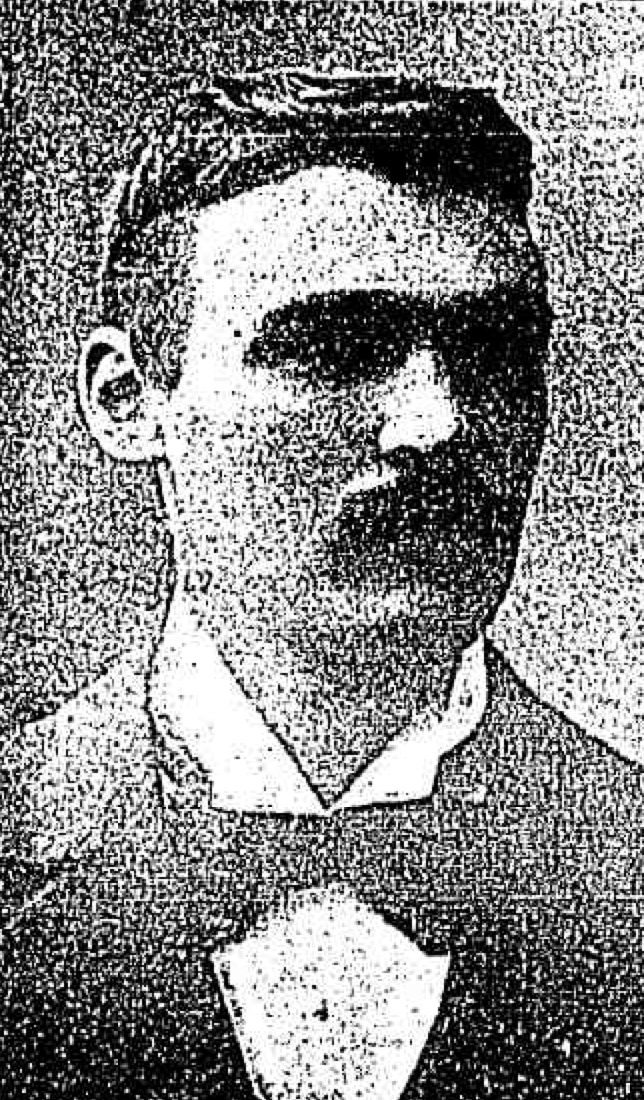
- Wilson in 1896

Personal information
- Full name: Joseph Francis Wilson
- Born: 27 September 1870; Launceston, Tasmania
- Died: 7 December 1912 (aged 42); Footscray, Victoria
- Original team: Launceston Grammar
- Weight: 10 st 8 lb (67 kg; 148 lb) (Note: This was Wilson's weight in 1888, aged 17.)
- Position: Utility

Playing career^{1}
Years	Club	Games (Goals)
1886–1889 (Note: Only includes his years as part of Launceston's senior team. He played reserves in 1885 and 1886.)	Launceston (NTFA)	? (?)
1890–1896	Melbourne (VFA)	117 (32)

Representative team honours^{2}
Years	Team	Games (Goals)
1888–1889	NTFA	5 (1)
1891	Victoria	1
- ^{1} Playing statistics correct to the end of 1896.^{2} Representative statistics correct as of 1891.

Career highlights
- NTFA premiership 1888, 1889; Melbourne captain 1895–96

Joseph Francis Wilson (Note: His first name is also shortened to "Jo" and "Jos" in addition to the more common "Joe".) (27 September 1870 – 7 December 1912) was an Australian sportsman who was prominent during the late 19th century. Originally from Launceston, Tasmania, he was educated at Launceston Grammar School and played Australian rules football and cricket for the school's firsts aged only 15. In addition to his school sports, Wilson played football for the Launceston Football Club in the Northern Tasmanian Football Association (NTFA) and cricket for several senior Launceston clubs. He established himself as one of Launceston's best all-round sportsmen by the time he completed high school; he was a prominent member of Launceston Football Club's consecutive NTFA premiership teams of 1888 and 1889, and he regularly represented Northern Tasmania in cricket and football.

Wilson moved to Melbourne in 1890 after being offered a banking job on the condition he play for the Melbourne Football Club, which competed in the Victorian Football Association (VFA), and the Melbourne Cricket Club (MCC). He played for the cricket club for four seasons, but was never consistently selected in the first XI. Wilson's most notable performances for the MCC were the final match of the 1892–93 season when he was part of a last-wicket partnership that secured the premiership for Melbourne and a match against a touring English XI where he took the wickets of three Test cricketers.

As a footballer, Wilson was known for his marking and versatility—he was as a utility who could be positioned as a forward, defender or follower. He quickly established himself as one of Melbourne's best players and represented Victoria in his second season with the club. Melbourne had been one of the weaker sides in the competition when he joined, but the recruitment of Wilson and several other prominent players began to steadily turn the club around. By the mid-1890s, Melbourne was a regular contender for the VFA premiership and in 1893 and 1894 finished runners-up to powerhouse Essendon. Towards the end of the 1895 season, the Melbourne captain, Eddie Fox, retired and Wilson was appointed his replacement for the remainder of the year. He continued in the role for a further season before retiring at the end of 1896.

== Early life ==
Joe Wilson was educated at Launceston Grammar School. A talented junior sportsman, he regularly represented the school in football and cricket. He is first recorded playing football for the school's firsts in 1885, which is around the same time he first played for Launceston Football Club's seconds. The following summer he played cricket for his school and the Our Boys Cricket Club first XI. In one match for Our Boys, his batting was described by the Launceston Examiner as "the feature of the game". In March 1886, Wilson dominated a match between his school and Horton College—he made 154 runs in his team's first innings, at the time the second highest individual score ever recorded at the Launceston Cricket Ground, and then took 17 wickets, including a hat-trick, for only 28 runs in Horton's two innings. At the conclusion of the cricket season, Wilson won two trophies from the Our Boys club—for highest individual score and highest batting average.

In June 1886, Wilson played his first match for Launceston Football Club's senior team, in a non-premiership game against Latrobe. He spent most of the season in the seconds and kicked one goal for the year. The next cricket season he again played for Our Boys and his school. On Boxing Day 1886, Wilson represented Northern Tasmania in the annual North v South match in Hobart. After a match in February 1887, Launceston's Daily Telegraph described Wilson as "from his present form, [...] fit for any eleven in Tasmania". At the conclusion of the cricket season, Wilson again represented Northern Tasmania, this time against the touring Melbourne Cricket Club (MCC).

Wilson played several matches for Launceston's firsts during the 1887 football season. In a match against Holebrook, he was named among the team's best players. Wilson played for his school during the 1887–88 cricket season and, in one match against Esk, took five wickets for 67 runs (5/67). Later that season he also played for Launceston Cricket Club in a game against Esk. In April 1888, he represented his school in rowing.

For the 1888 season, Wilson was made captain of the Launceston Grammar School football team. He also became a leading player for the Launceston Football Club. Wilson kicked two of his team's three goals in a school match against Horton College, and was named in Launceston's best players in several games, including matches against South Launceston and City that counted towards the premiership. In a match that was to decide the premiership, against South Launceston, Wilson put in a creditable performance. The game ended in a draw, which left the teams even on the ladder, and a subsequent game was scheduled for two weeks later. In that match, Wilson kicked one of Launceston's five goals as they ran out two-goal victors to win their first Northern Tasmanian Football Association (NTFA) premiership. He was named in Launceston's best players for the match by the Launceston Examiner. For the following cricket season, Wilson moved to play with St. Leonards.

=== After high school ===
In one of the early matches of the 1889 football season, Wilson was best on ground in Launceston's win against City. It was reported in June 1889 by The Colonist that Wilson had moved to Hobart and was likely to join Railway Football Club in the Southern Tasmanian Football Association (STFA). However, before completing the move, Wilson changed his mind and elected to keep playing for Launceston. When Victorian Football Association (VFA) side South Melbourne toured in July, Wilson represented the NTFA against them—he was named one of the local side's better players in a six-goal loss. Launceston won their second consecutive premiership that year. In a game towards the end of the season, En Avant of The Colonist described Wilson's marking as "a treat to witness".

Wilson played for Tamar Cricket Club during the 1889–90 season. He again represented Northern Tasmania in the annual North v South match, playing an innings that was said to "please all lovers of the game". In another representative match, he played for a combined Northern Tasmania side against the touring Victorians; Wilson made 45 runs against a bowling attack that included Test cricketers Harry Trott and Eugene Palmer.

== Melbourne ==
=== Move to Melbourne ===
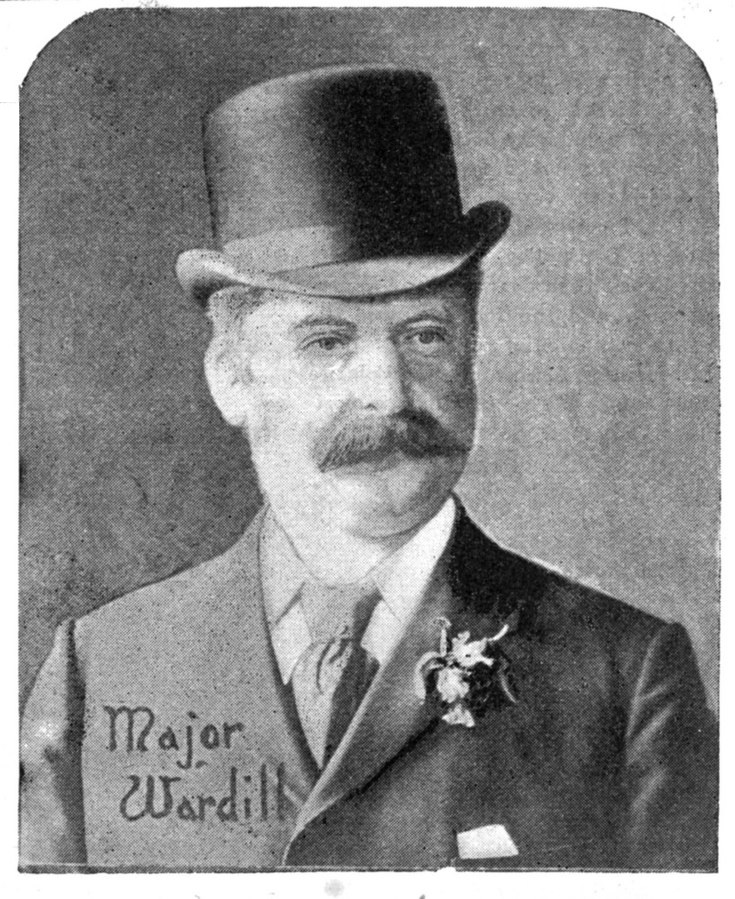
Major Wardill, who recruited Wilson to Melbourne

In April 1890, it was announced in The Colonist that Wilson was leaving Launceston to move to Melbourne. He had been recruited by Major Wardill, the secretary of the Melbourne Cricket Club, who offered Wilson a "lucrative position" at a Melbourne branch of the National Bank of Australasia if he came to play for the cricket club and the Melbourne Football Club, with which the cricket club had a close affiliation. On his departure from Tasmania, he was described as "the best all-round cricketer and footballer in the North".

Wilson made his debut for the Melbourne Football Club on 24 May in a match against Ballarat that did not count towards the VFA premiership. He had an immediate impact, kicking the first goal of the match. Wilson made his VFA debut a week later, playing as a follower in a match against South Melbourne. Writing in The Australasian, Markwell was complimentary of Wilson's performance, saying he gave South trouble. In the round 8 match against Geelong, Wilson scored what was described as a "splendid goal".

Wilson began playing with the Melbourne Cricket Club in the 1890–91 season. He played two premiership matches early in the season, against Port Melbourne and Richmond, but scored only 13 runs in two innings and was not called upon to bowl. He did not play in another senior premiership game until the next season. In a match against Wesley College in March 1891, he played a high quality innings, scoring 121 runs. Several weeks later, while playing for MCC's seconds against South Melbourne's seconds, he took 13 wickets for 61 runs. The Tasmanian noted that it was pity he had not played that well earlier in the season, or he probably would have secured a permanent place in the first XI.

=== Breaking through ===
By the 1891 football season, Wilson was considered one of the best players in Melbourne's team. In June 1891, he was named among Melbourne's best players in a win over St Kilda and was one of four Melbourne players to represent Victoria in an intercolonial match against South Australia. While reviewing the round 15 match between Melbourne and Geelong, Markwell wrote that Wilson was a particular crowd favourite due to his fair play. Wilson kicked a goal during the round 17 match against South Melbourne and was noted as being part of "a talented combination of followers" for Melbourne. In his review of the 1891 season, Follower listed Wilson among Melbourne's followers who had "worthily held their own" throughout the year.

After a disappointing initial season for the MCC, Wilson's 1891–92 season was much more productive. A regular in the firsts, he was described as batting "soundly and freely" in a match against Carlton and made a "highly spoken of performance" against South Melbourne, where he scored 47 runs and was Melbourne's leading wicket-taker with three. Wilson played a total of four premiership matches for Melbourne that season and also represented them against Lord Sheffield's touring English XI. In that match Wilson took the wickets of George Bean, George Lohmann and William Attewell, all Test cricketers. In the final match of the Victorian cricket season, to decide the pennant between Melbourne and South Melbourne, Wilson was selected for MCC, but did not get a chance to bat and only bowled four overs in a weather-affected match that ended in a draw—the premiership defaulted to South Melbourne because they had a slightly higher average during the season.

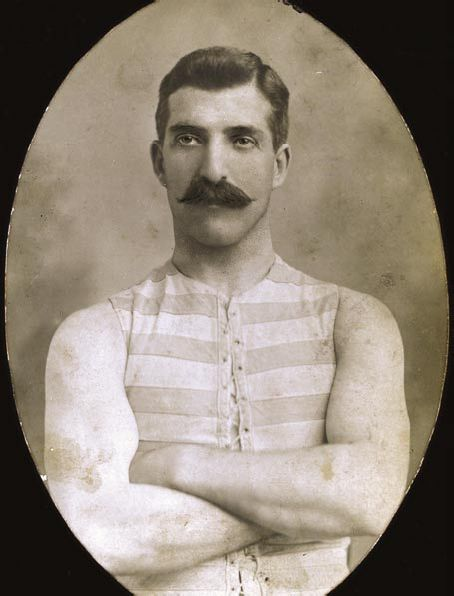
Dolly Christy, a football teammate of Wilson's from 1891 to 1896

Wilson was again one of Melbourne's better players for the 1892 football season. In a round 14 match against Fitzroy, Wilson kicked three of the Redlegs' six goals in a one-goal victory. Two weeks later, he was described as "performing meritoriously" in a game where he also kicked a goal. In the third-last game of the season, Melbourne drew a match away to a poor Collingwood team. Markwell wrote in The Australasian that Wilson and Dolly Christy, who had both missed the match, were sorely missed. Melbourne finished the season in fourth position on the ladder, their highest finish since 1886, though Markwell thought the result was disappointing when considering the calibre of players the club had recruited. He named Wilson as one of the team's "most deserving" players for the year.

The 1892–93 season was Wilson's most productive in Victorian cricket. He played six senior premiership matches and took 10 wickets at an average of 22.20, including an innings of 3/40 against South Melbourne where he dismissed first-class players Willie Over and Albert Rains. Melbourne played against Fitzroy in the final match of the season to decide the premiership. Fitzroy batted first and made 282, with Wilson taking 3/56 from 18.2 overs, including the wickets of Victorian players Thomas Hastings and George Beacham. Melbourne had only to pass Fitzroy's first innings total to secure the premiership, but were in a perilous situation at 9/237 when Wilson came in at number 11. He joined James O'Halloran to put on a partnership of 48, of which Wilson contributed 24, which was just enough to surpass Fitzroy's score. Writing for The Australasian, Felix observed that, although Wilson was not as comfortable at the crease as his partner O'Halloran, he still put in a performance that was "deserving of mention" and that several of the fours he hit off Beacham "had to be seen to be appreciated". Fitzroy got to 5/60 in their second innings before stumps was called and the result was declared a draw, enough for Melbourne to win the premiership. Wilson took one wicket from his two overs, that of Albert Fox.

Melbourne began the 1893 football season strongly, winning their first eight matches. Wilson missed the first match of the year, but returned for the Redlegs' round 2 victory over Port Melbourne. He missed the following week's clash against St Kilda due to work commitments, which The Sportsman jokingly called "a new experience for bank clerks". In Melbourne's victory over South Melbourne on 17 June, Markwell reported in The Australasian that Wilson's performance was "meritorious". Coming in to round 9, both Melbourne and Essendon had both won their first eight matches and the contest between the two was highly anticipated. In front of about 25,000 spectators at the East Melbourne Cricket Ground, the two teams put on what Observer of The Argus called a great match. Melbourne kicked away early to lead by five goals to one at half time, but Essendon, who had won the past two premierships, fought back, kicking four goals to nil in the second half for the match to finish in a thrilling draw. Observer called Wilson a "first-class Red man" and noted that he "[held] his marks well" while playing in the backline.

The Redlegs went on to win their next four games, including a match against Collingwood where Wilson played as a forward and kicked two of the team's four goals in the absence of their main goalkicker William Smith. A week later against Fitzroy, Wilson again played forward and kicked two goals, including one from over 60 yards (55 m) out, in a two-goal win. Wilson was one of Melbourne's best in the round 13 game against Williamstown, according to the North Melbourne Advertiser. The next week Melbourne met Essendon for the second time that season. Each side had won all their matches for the year so far, except for the drawn game between the two teams earlier in the year. The Age wrote that the match had been eagerly awaited and that nearly 30,000 spectators attended, including hundreds of people from places as far away as Bendigo and Ballarat. In a contrast to the two sides' first meeting, it was the Same Olds who started strongest and they led by four goals to one at half time. Wilson had one of the opening shots on goal of the game, but was only able to register a behind. Melbourne began to come back in the second half and Wilson set up Mickey Roche to kick the Redlegs' second goal of the match. At three-quarter time, Melbourne were still three goals in arrears and they came out playing some of their best football of the year—O'Loughlin kicked a goal midway through the quarter and then several players, including Wilson, had unsuccessful shots on goal. Ernest Howes scored the Reds' fourth goal, but it was too late for Melbourne as the siren to end the game sounded only seconds later.

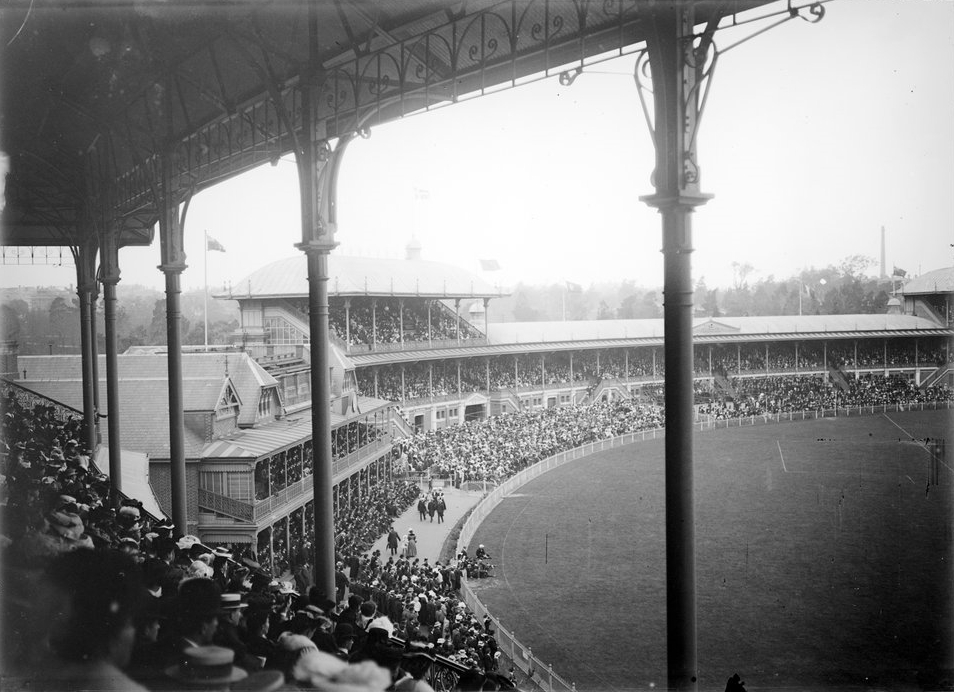
The Melbourne Cricket Ground (pictured in 1914), where Wilson played cricket and football

Melbourne bounced back the next week with a win over Carlton, but lost the week after at home to Geelong, despite leading by five goals to one at quarter time. This opened up a two-win advantage for Essendon at the top of the ladder. Reviewing the match, Markwell wrote that Wilson had played better games, but that he worked as hard as anyone on the ground and was "singularly unselfish". Melbourne dropped more points with a round 17 draw against South Melbourne and when the Redlegs played another draw two weeks later, this time against St Kilda, The Argus declared the premiership race all but over. Wilson recovered from a form slump to kick both of Melbourne's goals in the St Kilda match, but it was not enough to get the Redlegs over the line. He was again in the best players in Melbourne's round 20 win over Carlton. The Reds closed out the season with two more wins, but it was not enough to catch Essendon who remained undefeated and Melbourne finished runners-up. In his appraisal of the season, Markwell named Wilson in his best dozen Melbourne players.

Wilson's last season for the Melbourne Cricket Club came in 1893–94. He missed the first two premiership matches of the season, but after top scoring with 47 and taking two wickets in a non-premiership match against Fitzroy, Wilson was selected for the third match, against North Melbourne. Wilson took 1/72 in the first innings against North, the wicket being that of Isaac Drape, and scored 27 runs batting at number 10. He was not called upon to bat or bowl in the second innings. Wilson was retained in the side for the next match against Carlton. He batted at 11 in the first innings and was on 0 not out when the innings closed. Wilson was not required to bowl or bat again in what ended up being his final match for the MCC. In total, he played 14 matches for Melbourne for a return of 138 runs at a batting average of 10.61 and 15 wickets at a bowling average of 30.73.

=== Post-cricket retirement ===
According to Observer, Wilson almost retired from football too, and it was only "with difficulty" that he was persuaded to continue training. He missed the first four games of the 1894 premiership season, during which Melbourne struggled and lost two. Wilson made his first appearance that year in round 5 against Richmond; Observer wrote that Wilson's return was an "agreeable surprise" and that his marking in particular was impressive. He kicked one goal in a game Melbourne won nine goals to eight. The Redlegs faced Essendon the next week, who were again top of the table. Melbourne lost by four goals to six, largely due to their inaccuracy kicking for goal. Wilson was said by Markwell to "come under favourable notice" while playing in defence that match. Melbourne responded the next week to defeat Port Melbourne in game where Wilson's leadership and direction was praised and Observer commented that he was "as useful a man as Melbourne had". He was switched into attack for the round 8 victory over Carlton and Markwell wrote that Wilson was "frequently troublesome".

Melbourne continued on their winning way with a round 11 win against South Melbourne. Wilson played forward and kicked three of Melbourne's nine goals in a comprehensive victory. The Redlegs' winning streak stretched to eight games; during this time Wilson's forward play was at various times described as "clever", "busy" and a "shining example of unselfishness". Melbourne's good form came to a grinding halt in the reverse fixture against Essendon. They were comprehensively defeated by the Same Olds who secured their fourth consecutive premiership. The Reds' forwards were roundly criticised by Observer, but Wilson was praised as the "only one of them who played a decent game". Melbourne won two of their remaining three games to finish runners-up for the second consecutive year.

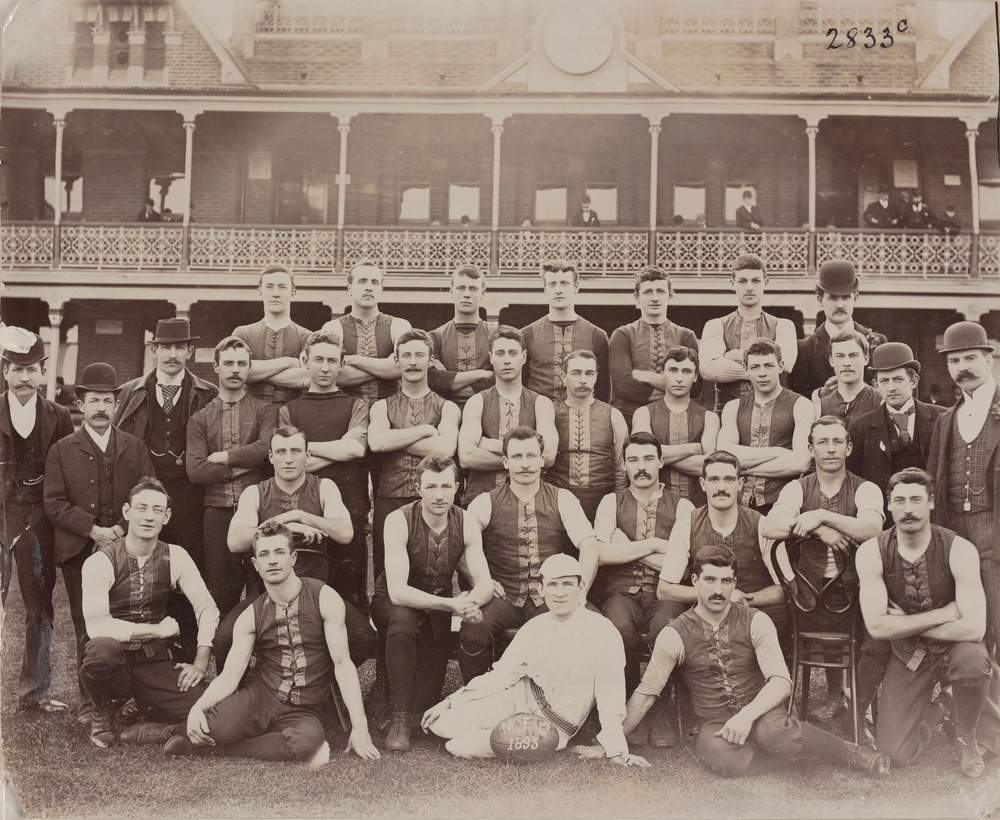
The Melbourne Football Club team in 1895

Wilson began the 1895 season much as he had finished 1894, playing in the forward line and often receiving praise from football journalists. Melbourne defeated South Melbourne in their first game of the season and Markwell wrote that he did "a lot of serviceable work". In round 3, the Reds were finally able to defeat Essendon after falling short four times in the previous two years, although the match was said to be of poor quality. Wilson was one of the Redlegs' goalkickers. The club's vice-captain, O'Loughlin, returned to Queensland in June and Wilson was elected to replace him. In his first match after being appointed, against North Melbourne in round 6, Wilson was said to do "every honour to the distinction" as he played his best game of the season and kicked a goal to help Melbourne remain undefeated. Melbourne played Richmond the next week and won again with Wilson this time described as a "brilliantly consistent worker". Their winning run continued through to round 9 as the Reds defeated Williamstown by a goal; Wilson was "the pick of Melbourne's forwards" that match according to Markwell. Melbourne's undefeated run came to an end the next week, in a loss to Fitzroy. Due to the absence of many of Melbourne's regular followers in round 14 against Essendon, Wilson was required to play in that position. The Redlegs lost the match, but Wilson was named one of Melbourne's best on the day.

=== Captaincy ===
Eddie Fox, who had been Melbourne's captain for six of the last seven seasons, retired from football in late August. Wilson was named captain in his stead at what was a difficult time, the Redlegs having lost their last two matches. In his first game in charge, against North Melbourne, it was said that Wilson "showed much judgment in disposing his men". Melbourne won the match four goals to two and Wilson also had a good individual game playing in a variety of positions. The Reds finished the season having won three of their four games under Wilson's captaincy, which was enough to finish third on the ladder, two wins away from Fitzroy in top spot.

Wilson remained captain for the 1896 season, though he missed the first four matches of the year due a suspension he had incurred at the end of the previous season. He returned to the side for round 5 against Williamstown and played up forward in a comfortable 11-goal win. In Melbourne's round 7 win over St Kilda, Markwell wrote that Wilson was "distinctly at his best". And in a round 11 victory against North Melbourne, the same journalist wrote that he had the "soundest judgement" of all forwards on the field. Wilson played "excellently" in the Reds' defeat of Carlton the next week; Markwell remarked upon his desire "to annihilate the men in blue". He kicked his first goal of the season in round 15, a two-goal win over Collingwood, and finished the day with two majors. Markwell observed that Wilson's "judgment and coolness" went a long way to Melbourne winning their round 16 encounter with Essendon. Melbourne finished the season in fourth place on the ladder. Though they never seriously challenged for the premiership, it was noted that the club had bad luck through suspension and injury, and when they got their best team on the field they could challenge anyone. In his review of the season, Markwell named Wilson one of Melbourne's best half dozen players.

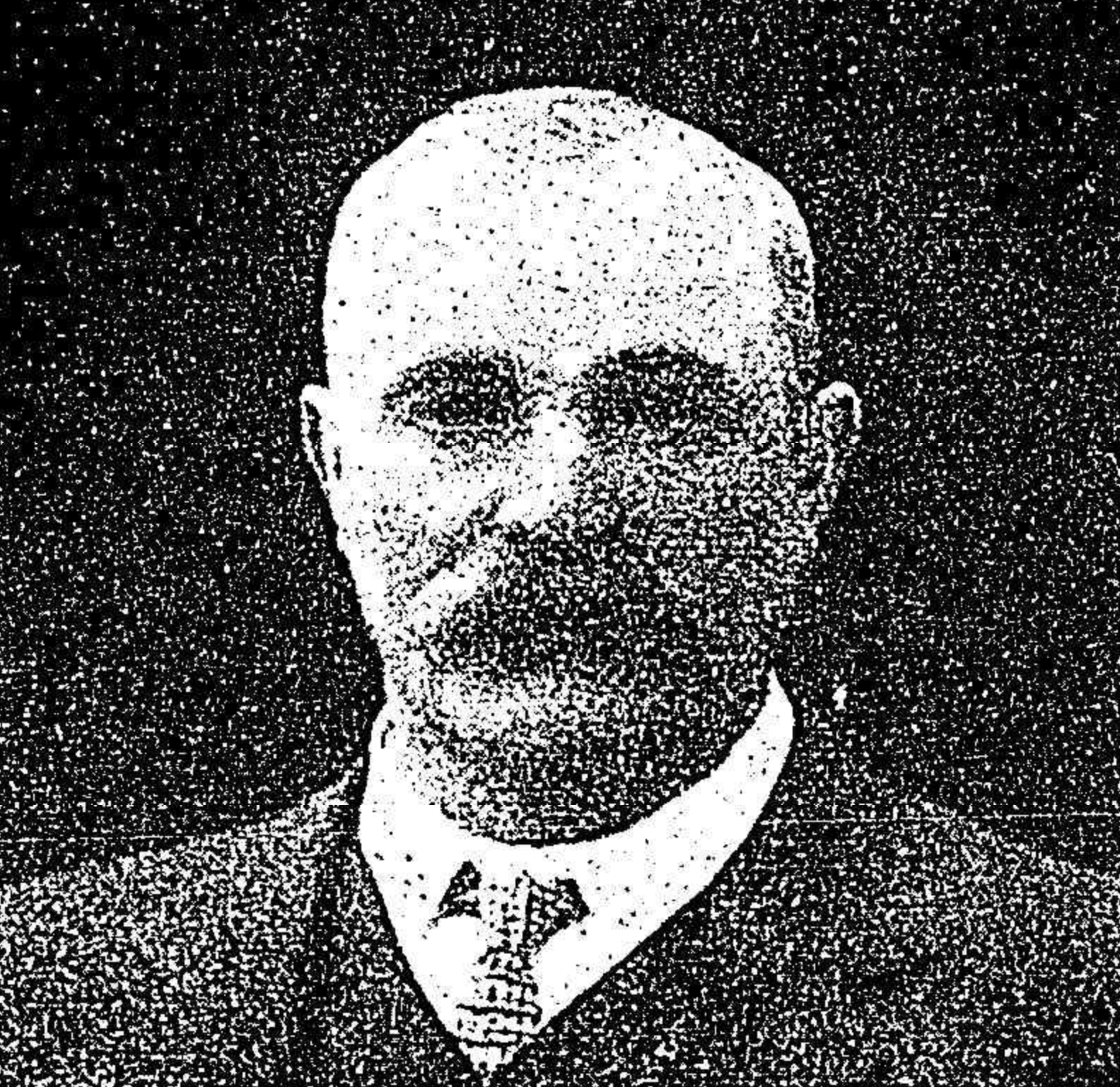
Wilson in 1908

Wilson retired from football at the conclusion of the 1896 season. In 1897 he played bowls instead of football. After his retirement, he was remembered as being "solidity itself" for Melbourne. In his native state he was mentioned alongside Fred McGinis, William Smith, Colin Campbell and George Vautin as players who left Tasmania and more than held their own against the mainland's best.

== Later life ==
Wilson worked for the National Bank of Australasia for 23 years at various suburban Melbourne branches, including East Collingwood, Clifton Hill, Boort and finally Footscray. He had a unique record of never missing a morning's work with the bank. Wilson was married to Elizabeth Mackey, the daughter of a wine and spirits merchant. On 7 December 1912, Wilson died at his home in Footscray of a heart ailment he had been suffering from for a year. He was survived by his wife and a child. He was buried at Footscray Cemetery.
