= Eddie Fox =

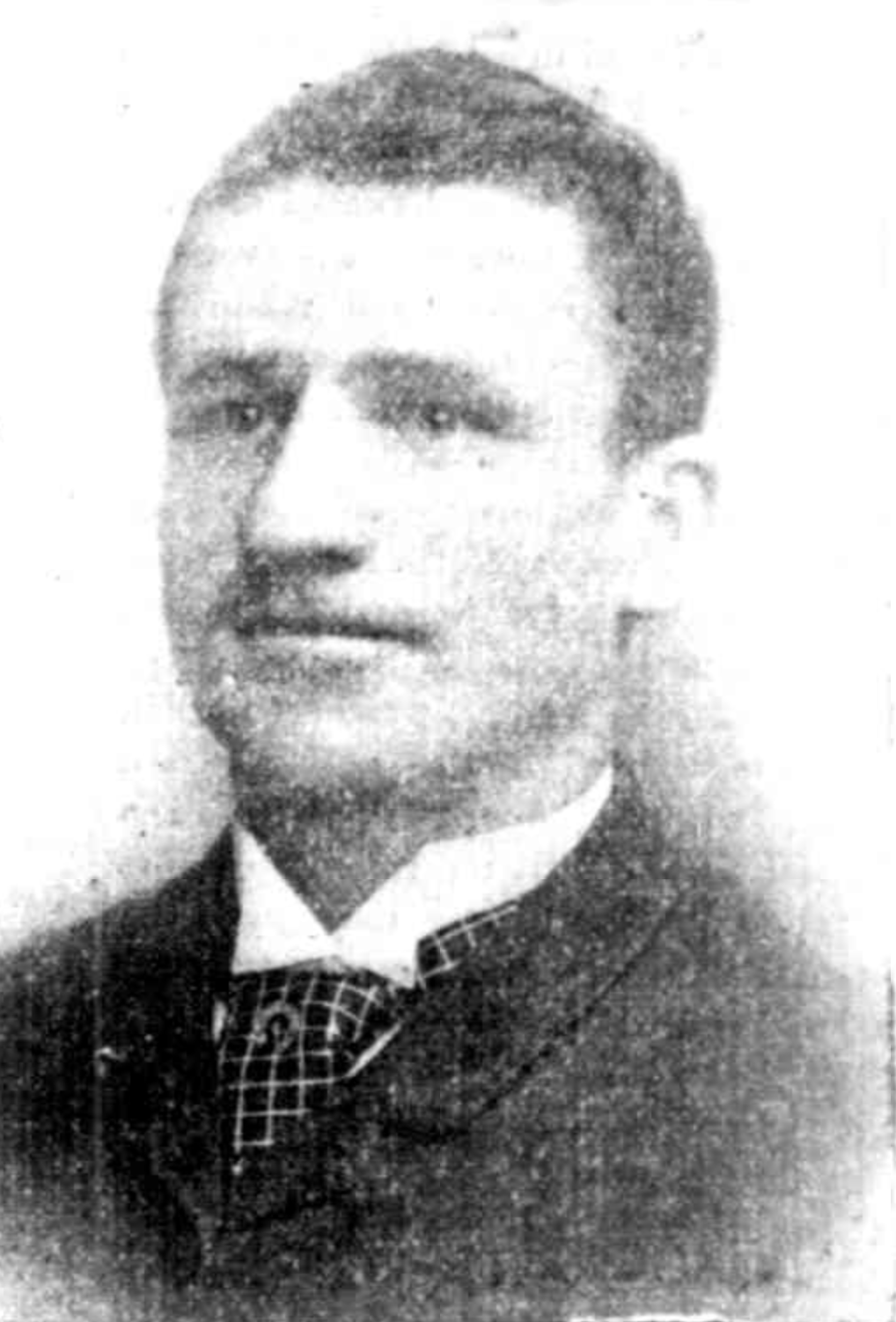
- Fox in 1895

Personal information
- Full name: Edward Albert Fox
- Born: 1864; Ballarat, Victoria
- Died: March 12, 1945 (aged 80–81)
- Original team: North Park
- Position: Half-back

Playing career
Years	Club	Games (Goals)
1886	Hotham	9 (0)
1887–1895	Melbourne	166 (0)
Total		175 (0)

Representative team honours
Years	Team	Games (Goals)
1890–1891	Victoria	3 (0)

Edward Albert Fox (Note: Fox's first name is shortened to "Eddie" and "Eddy" interchangeably in contemporary sources.) (1864 – 12 March 1945) was an Australian rules footballer who played for Melbourne Football Club and Hotham Football Club in the Victorian Football Association (VFA) during the late 19th century.

Fox grew up in North Melbourne and was recruited to local VFA club Hotham for the 1886 season. He spent one season with Hotham, playing on the wing, before leaving to join fellow VFA club Melbourne for the 1887 season.

Fox became a regular in the Melbourne side playing at half-back; he did not miss a match for Melbourne from 1887 until an injury in 1893. Known for his physical strength—due to the large muscles he developed as an ironworker—and attack on the ball, Fox was selected to represent Victoria in three games over 1890 and 1891.

In 1889 Fox became captain of Melbourne, a position that he retained for the majority of the next seven seasons. Melbourne were a weak team in the late 1880s, generally finishing towards the bottom of the ladder. Under Fox's leadership, the club steadily became more competitive and by 1893 and 1894 they were competing for the premiership—ultimately finishing second to Essendon in both years. Fox played one further season in 1895 where Melbourne finished third; he retired towards the end of the season and Joe Wilson was elected to replace him as captain.

== Football career ==
Born in Ballarat in 1864 to John James Fox and Margaret Mulcahy, Eddie Fox was raised in North Melbourne. The second of nine children, he had five brothers—Tommy, Jack, Billy, Dan and Frank—who all played football and cricket; Eddie was the best of them at football. Fox played junior football for Albion Park and North Park before being recruited by Hotham in the Victorian Football Association (VFA).

Fox debuted for Hotham in the VFA in the first round of the 1886 season. The North Melbourne Advertiser reported that Fox played on the wing and "showed some dashing play" which augured well for the season ahead. The Argus wrote that Fox was one of the Hotham players who "frequently won the applause of spectators" in a game which Hotham won. In Hotham's next match, a win over Fitzroy, Vigilant wrote in the North Melbourne Advertiser that Fox was "knocked about" by the opposition but worked hard despite it. The next week, Hotham lost their first match of the season and Vigilant opined that, despite playing a good match, Fox "can do better". Fox was unable to consistently hold his place in Hotham's side in 1886, for example being named an emergency in round 11 against Williamstown. Writing towards the end of the 1896 season, O.C. in The Weekly Times declared Fox to be a "a fair player, but rather too anxious". Fox ended up playing nine senior games for Hotham in his first VFA season.

It was reported in April 1887 that Fox was looking for a transfer from Hotham to fellow VFA club Melbourne for the 1887 season. Fox did end up making the move to Melbourne and was named in Melbourne's best players several times in his first season with the club. In August 1887, Fox was part of a Melbourne team that toured Tasmania and played several matches against the locals.

In June 1888, Fox was a member of a Melbourne squad that toured Queensland. Fox was again named in Melbourne's best players a number of times through the 1888 season. In Goal Post's wrap-up of the 1888 season for The Sportsman, he named Fox first when listing Melbourne's best players for that year while being critical of the team's performance overall.

"Although Fox is rough he invariably brings down as many comrades as opponents. Indeed, in going for a high mark, he brings down with complete impartiality everyone who is unfortunate enough to get in the way of his thunderbolt rush."

— Observer, The Argus, May 1893

At the beginning of the 1889 season at the club's annual general meeting (AGM), Fox was elected to the committee of the club and to the selection committee of the senior team. Additionally, Fox also became captain of the team at the beginning of the season. By this point of his career, Fox had become a defender and in a match against Essendon in 1889 he was awarded a trophy for "back play". In a game against Footscray on 10 July 1889, Fox was attacked by Footscray supporters while the match was in play; Goal Post of The Sportsman called it a "disgraceful occurrence" and said that Fox was fortunate not to have received a serious injury. At the end of the 1889 season, Fox was presented "a neat gold watch, chain and locket" by the committee and members of the club to show their appreciation for his leadership that season.

Fox remained captain for the 1890 season. In July 1890, Fox was selected to represent Victoria in an intercolonial match against South Australia in Melbourne. Fox played in his usual position at half-back and Victoria won the match comfortably.

Fox was again elected to the club's committee at the beginning of 1891 and he also continued on as captain. He was again selected for intercolonial duties, this time to play two matches against South Australia in Adelaide. Victoria won one match and lost one; Fox was described as "very prominent" in the second match by Drop-Kick of The Sportsman.

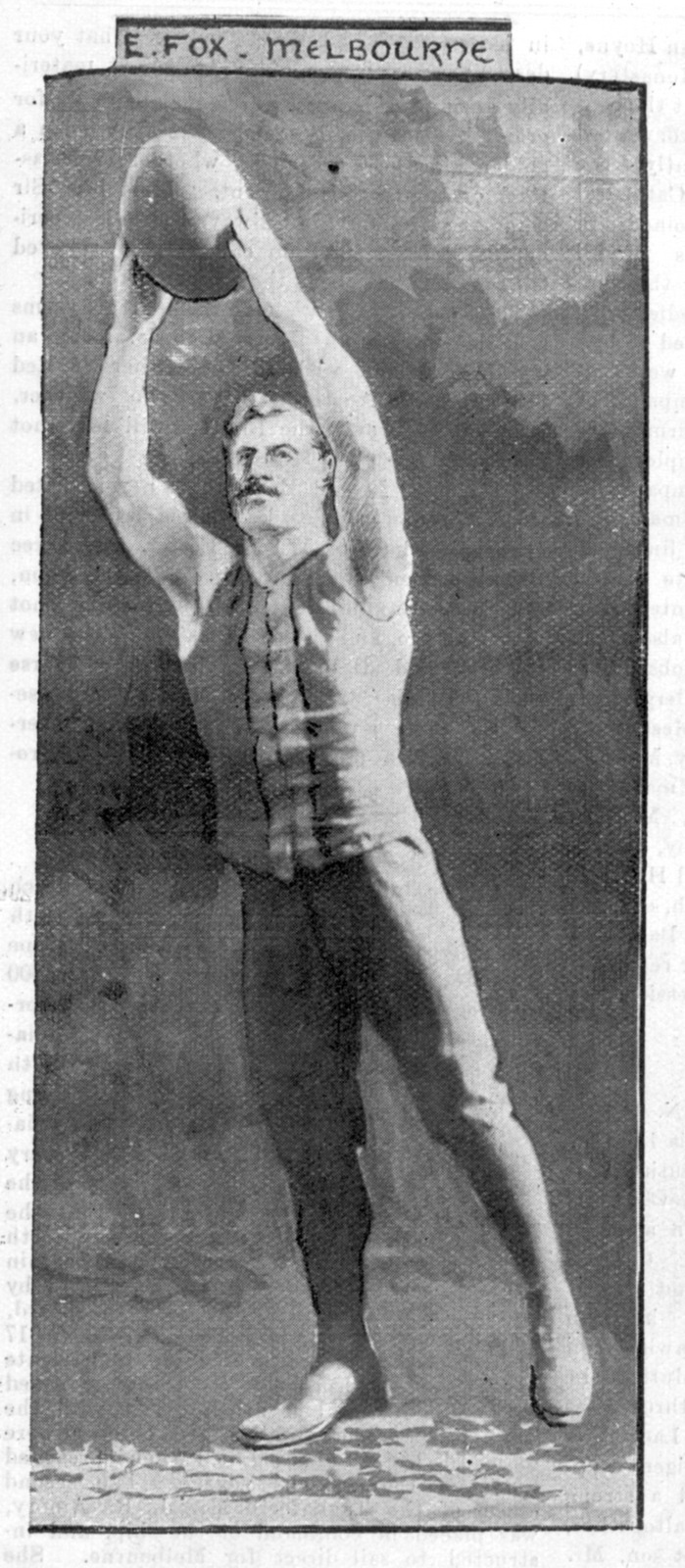
Fox taking a mark in 1895

Prior to the first game of the 1892 season, Melbourne held an election among the players to decide on the captaincy for the season ahead. Despite holding the post for the previous three years, Fox lost the election to William Aitken by one vote. In June 1892, Fox toured South Australia with Melbourne, playing three matches. In August, Aitken left Victoria to move to the United States and Fox was re-elected as captain. At the conclusion of Fox's first match back as captain, playing away to Fitzroy, Fox was attacked by Fitzroy supporters and only just made his way back to the change rooms safely. When the Melbourne players then left the ground their vehicles were pelted with stones.

At the club's AGM to begin the 1893 season, Fox was re-elected as captain. He was praised for the job he had done as captain the previous year once Aitken had left and it was also noted that his personal performance had remained strong. Melbourne started the season well, winning their first eight games. In round 9 they faced Essendon, who had won the past two premierships, and were also undefeated for the season to date. Writing in The Argus, Observer was effusive in his praise for the quality of the match. Played in front of roughly 25,000 spectators at the East Melbourne Cricket Ground, Melbourne started the game strongly, leading five goals to one at half time. The Essendon captain, Alick Dick, moved two extra men into the ruck after half time which helped swing the match in Essendon's direction. Observer wrote that Fox should have matched Dick's move to nullify it, but that it was easy to say in hindsight. Essendon kicked four goals to nil in the second half for the game to end in a thrilling draw. Observer noted that Fox had "every man's hand against him" in the second half and "did much for Melbourne during the crisis". Melbourne and Essendon both won their intervening matches and met again in round 14 in a match that would essentially decide the premiership. Played in front of nearly 30,000 spectators at the Melbourne Cricket Ground, the match was almost the opposite of their meeting prior in the season. Essendon started strongly and led by four goals to one at half time. Melbourne came back in the second half, scoring three goals to Essendon's one, ultimately losing by one goal. The Monday after the game, Fox was interviewed at his place of work—an ironworks in South Melbourne—by The Herald to discuss the game; Fox felt the forward line was most at fault for the loss. Fox missed his first match for the club in seven years in August 1893 when he suffered an injury, a strained leg. Essendon finished the season undefeated and Melbourne were runners-up to them for the premiership.

Fox was again elected to the captaincy and the club's committee for the 1894 season. After Melbourne's second round match against Footscray, The Sportsman reported that Fox had played "the best game he had played for six years [...] and that is saying a good deal". For the second consecutive season, Melbourne were Essendon's main competitor for the premiership. Melbourne almost pulled off an upset in June that year against Essendon, leading the match at three-quarter time, but ultimately lost five goals to three. In the return match in August, Melbourne needed a win to have any chance of denying Essendon the premiership. Down three goals to two at half time, Fox moved himself to play on Essendon superstar Albert Thurgood who had kicked one goal in the first half and set up another. Essendon kicked three goals to one in the third quarter despite Thurgood being held goalless. Fox kept himself on Thurgood for the last quarter, a decision which Observer was critical of in The Argus, and the Essendon champion kicked two of Essendon's four last-quarter goals, sealing the victory and the premiership for Essendon. At the end of the season, it was rumoured in The Herald that Fox was contemplating retirement from football.

"Eddy Fox, the Melbourne captain, is a solid player, game, smart and a cool-headed footballer. His position as half-back is always well-filled."

— The Weekly Times, May 1895

However, Fox did continue playing in 1895 and was again named captain. In round 3 Melbourne were finally able to defeat Essendon after several close losses over the past two seasons. Fox was one of Melbourne's best players on the day; Observer wrote that Fox had "not played a better game for years" and Markwell reported that Fox "was entirely in his element" throughout the game. Melbourne won their first eight games of the 1895 season; their first loss came to Fitzroy in July. Melbourne also lost the return fixture to Fitzroy in August in a match where it was reported that Fox "did very little". Fox retired from football the week after; he was succeeded as captain by Joe Wilson. Melbourne ultimately finished the season in third behind Fitzroy and Geelong.

== Personal life ==
"A tremendously strong half-back, in private life a welder of iron, whose giant muscles tossed men like marbles."

— Onlooker, The Referee, February 1919

Fox worked as an ironworker. An October 1925 article in The Age reported that Fox had been working at the South Melbourne Ironworks for 38 years at that point.

Fox stayed connected with Melbourne after his retirement from the game and was often noted in attendance watching their matches. In 1926, when Melbourne won their second Victorian Football League premiership, Fox was one of the "old leaders" to celebrate with the team in the clubrooms.

Fox died on 12 March 1945 and was interred at Coburg Cemetery on 14 March 1945.
