= Rochford (disambiguation) =

Rochford is a town in Essex, England.

Rochford may also refer to:

== Places ==
- Rochford (UK Parliament constituency), a former parliamentary constituency in Essex, England
- Rochford, Victoria, Australia
- Rochford, Worcestershire, England
- Rochford, South Dakota
- Rochford District, a non-metropolitan district of Essex, England, formed in 1974
- Rochford Rural District, a district of Essex, England abolished in 1974
- Stoke Rochford, England

== People ==
- Rochford (surname)
- Rochford Devenish-Meares (1948–2026), Australian rules footballer
- Rochford Hughes (1914–1996), British RAF officer

=== Title ===
- Earl of Rochford
- Viscount Rochford
