= Pat Le Marchand =

English cricketer and soldier

Personal information
- Full name: Lewis Patrick Le Marchand
- Born: 23 October 1908; Guntakal, Madras Presidency, British India
- Died: 27 November 1977 (aged 69); Tonbridge, Kent, England
- Batting: Unknown
- Bowling: Unknown
- Relatives: Guy Le Marchand (brother)

Domestic team information
- Years: Team
- 1929/30: Europeans

Career statistics
Competition	First-class
Matches	1
Runs scored	27
Batting average	27.00
100s/50s	–/–
Top score	19*
Balls bowled	90
Wickets	2
Bowling average	17.50
5 wickets in innings	–
10 wickets in match	–
Best bowling	2/35
Catches/stumpings	–/–
- Source: Cricinfo, 30 November 2023

Lewis Patrick Le Marchand OBE (23 October 1908 – 27 November 1977) was an English first-class cricketer, who served in the British Indian Army during the Second World War.

== Life, cricket and military career ==
The son of M. Le Marchand, a native of Devon, he was born in British India at Guntakal in October 1908. Despite a family connection to Tasmania in Australia (his brother, Guy, being educated at Launceston Grammar School), Le Marchand was educated in England at Beaumont College. He later returned to India, where he played first-class cricket for the Europeans cricket team against the Muslims at Lahore in the 1929–30 Lahore Tournament. Batting twice in the match, he was dismissed for 8 runs in the Europeans first innings by Mohammad Nissar, while in their second innings he was unbeaten on 19. With the ball, he took the wickets of Khadim and Azhar Hussain for the cost of 35 runs. In April 1930, he was appointed to the British Indian Army as a second lieutenant, with promotion to lieutenant following in April 1931. A member of the 5th Gorkha Rifles, he was appointed aide-de-camp to the Governor of the Punjab, Sir Herbert William Emerson in April 1934. He was promoted to captain in January 1938.

Le Marchand served in the Second World War with the British Indian Army; following the war, he was made an OBE in December 1945, with promotion to major following in January 1946. Following Indian Independence, he retired from the British Indian Army in June 1948, at which point he was granted the honorary rank of lieutenant colonel. Following his retirement, he relocated to Tasmania with his wife, who was a schoolteacher. His OBE was conferred onto him by Sir Hugh Binney in April 1950, for gallant and distinguished service during the Italian campaign.

In August 1950, he was commissioned into the Australian Army Reserve as a lieutenant colonel with Royal Australian Infantry Corps as part of the 6th Military District. In Tasmania, he was active in training cadets at Launceston Grammar School, and by the mid-1950s he was an insurance agent. In April 1954, he was fined £20 for income tax breaches. Le Marchand later returned to England, where he died at Tonbridge in November 1977.
