= Beaumont College =

Public school in Old Windsor, Berkshire, England

Coordinates: 51.449°N 0.575°W

- Old Windsor; Berkshire; England

Information
- Type: Public school Private school Boarding school
- Religious affiliation: Roman Catholic
- Established: 1861
- Founder: Society of Jesus
- Closed: 1967

Beaumont College was a public school in Old Windsor in Berkshire between 1861 and 1967. Founded and run by the Society of Jesus, it offered a Roman Catholic public school education in rural surroundings, while lying, like the neighbouring Eton College, within easy reach of London. It was therefore for many professional Catholics with school-age children a choice preferable to Stonyhurst College, the longer-standing Jesuit public school in North Lancashire. After the college's closure in 1967 the property was used in turn as a training centre, a conference centre and an hôtel; St John's Beaumont, the college's preparatory school for boys aged 3–13, continues, functioning in part as a feeder school for Stonyhurst.

== History of the estate ==
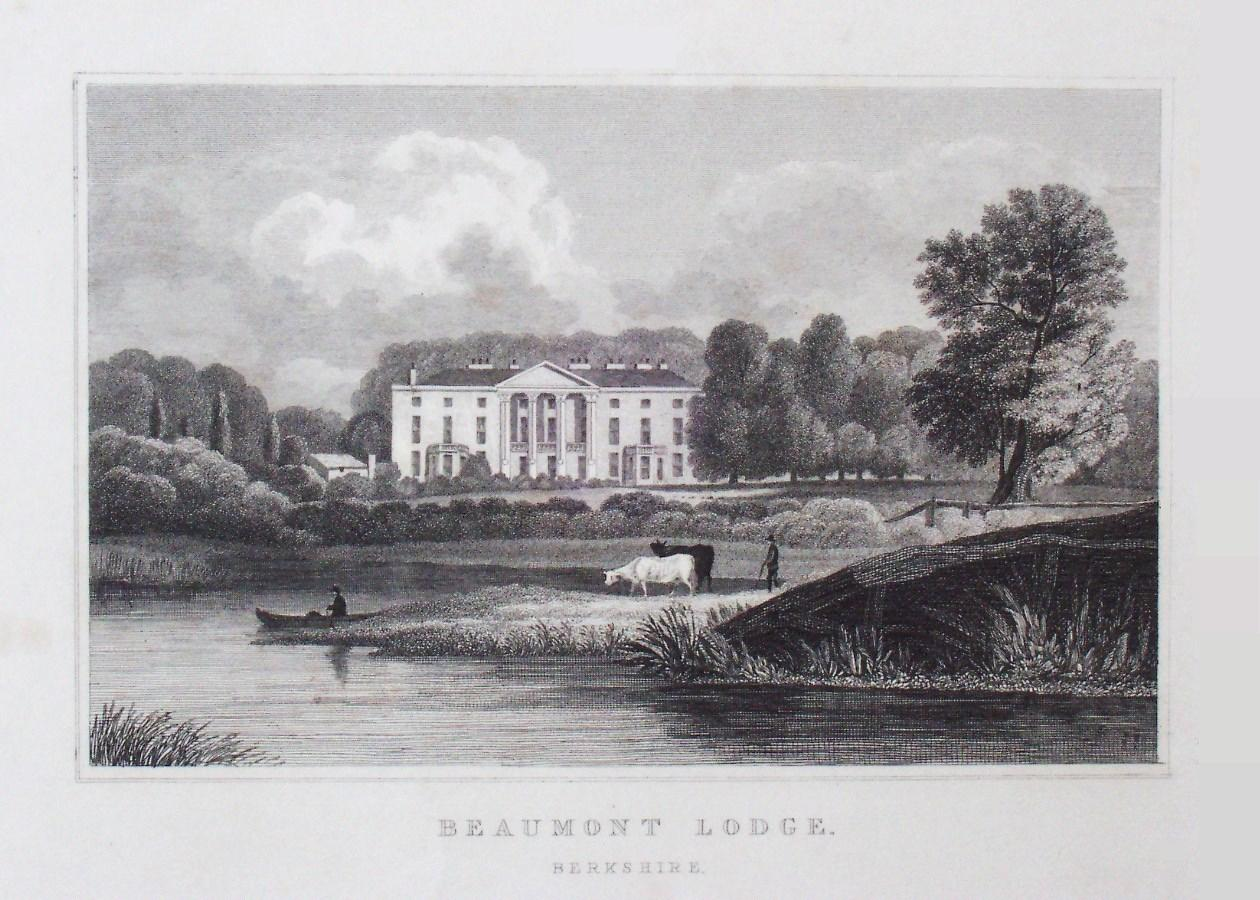
Engraving of Beaumont Lodge, circa 1830 – placed closer to the river Thames than it now is, whether because the river has moved or by artistic licence

The estate lies by the River Thames on the historic highway from Staines to Windsor, near Runnymede. It was originally known as Remenham, after Hugo de Remenham, who held the land at the end of the 14th century. The estate was then owned for a period by the Tyle family, and subsequently by John Morley, Francis Kibblewhite, William Christmas and Henry Frederick Thynne (clerk to the Privy Council under Charles II) in the 17th century.

The current chief building, then known as Bowman's Lodge, was originally built in 1705 to a design by James Gibbs. In 1714 Thomas Thynne, 2nd Viscount Weymouth, inherited the estate; and in the mid-eighteenth century it was acquired by Sophia, Duchess of Kent. In 1751 the Duke of Roxburghe purchased the land for his eldest son, the Marquess of Bowmont and Cessford (then a boy at Eton College), and renamed it Beaumont in his honour. In 1786 Warren Hastings, the first Governor-General of India, acquired Beaumont Lodge at the cost of £12,000. He lived at Beaumont for three years. In 1789 the estate was sold to Henry Griffith, an Anglo-Indian, who had the Windsor architect Henry Emlyn extensively rebuild the house in 1790 as a nine-bay mansion with a substantial portico.

== History as a school ==
In 1805 the Beaumont property was bought for about £14,000 by Henry Jeffrey Flower, 4th Viscount Ashbrook, a friend of George IV. After his death in 1847, his widow continued to reside there until 1854, when she sold it to the Society of Jesus as a training college.

For seven years it housed Jesuit novices of the (then) English province and on 10 October 1861 became a Catholic boarding school for boys, with the title of St. Stanislaus College, Beaumont, the dedication being to St. Stanislaus Kostka.

The 1901 census shows a John Lynch S.J. as headmaster. Resident at the date of the census were one other priest, three "clerks in minor orders" and a lay brother, 8 servants and 23 schoolboys including one American, one Canadian, one Mexican and two Spaniards; one of the latter was Luís Fernando de Orleans y Borbón, a Spanish royal prince.

Joseph M. Bampton S.J., rector 1901–1908, replaced the traditional Jesuit arrangement of close supervision of pupils by masters of discipline with the so-called "Captain" system, or government of boys by boys – perhaps inspired by the reforms of Thomas Arnold at Rugby in the 1830s. Bampton's Captain system was adopted also at Stonyhurst and at sister Jesuit schools in France and Spain, and in 1906 Beaumont was admitted to the Headmasters' Conference. Beaumont thus became, along with Stonyhurst College in Lancashire and St Aloysius' College, Glasgow, one of three public schools maintained by the English Province of the Jesuits.

Prominent men educated there included the architect Sir Giles Gilbert Scott, the engineer Sir John Aspinall, and a number of members of the Spanish royal family. The Austrian monarchist intellectual Erik von Kuehnelt-Leddihn taught briefly at Beaumont in 1935–36. From 1943 to 1946, A. H. Armstrong, later to become the world's leading authority on the ancient philosopher Plotinus, was a classics master at the college.

In 1937 the Papal Envoy, Mgr Giuseppe Pizzardo, visited the college. During the Second World War one of the first doodlebugs destroyed an inn ("The Bells of Ouseley") close to the school.

In 1948 John Sinnott S.J. was one of only two public school headmasters who detected a hoax letter by Humphry Berkeley, then a Cambridge student, purporting to come from a fellow-head H. Rochester Sneath (invited to lead an exorcism, Sinnott requested a packet of salt "capable of being taken up in pinches"). The "lovable but vague" Sir Lewis Clifford S.J., a Jesuit holding a New Zealand baronetcy, was rector between 1950 and 1956, when he was replaced by John Coventry S.J.; and in the early 1950s the late Gerard W. Hughes S.J., now known as a prominent writer on spirituality, taught there. On 15 May 1961 Queen Elizabeth II visited Beaumont to mark its centenary.

== Character of the school ==
The main drive curves round an open field to a rendered 18th-century mansion known as the White House, most of the ancillary buildings being concealed by trees. The science laboratories were a single-storey 1930s block to the left of the main house. Other outbuildings ran backward from there, including the ambulacrum and tuck shop, but without obtruding unduly on the garden dominated by two specimen cedar trees and a war memorial by Sir Giles Gilbert Scott.

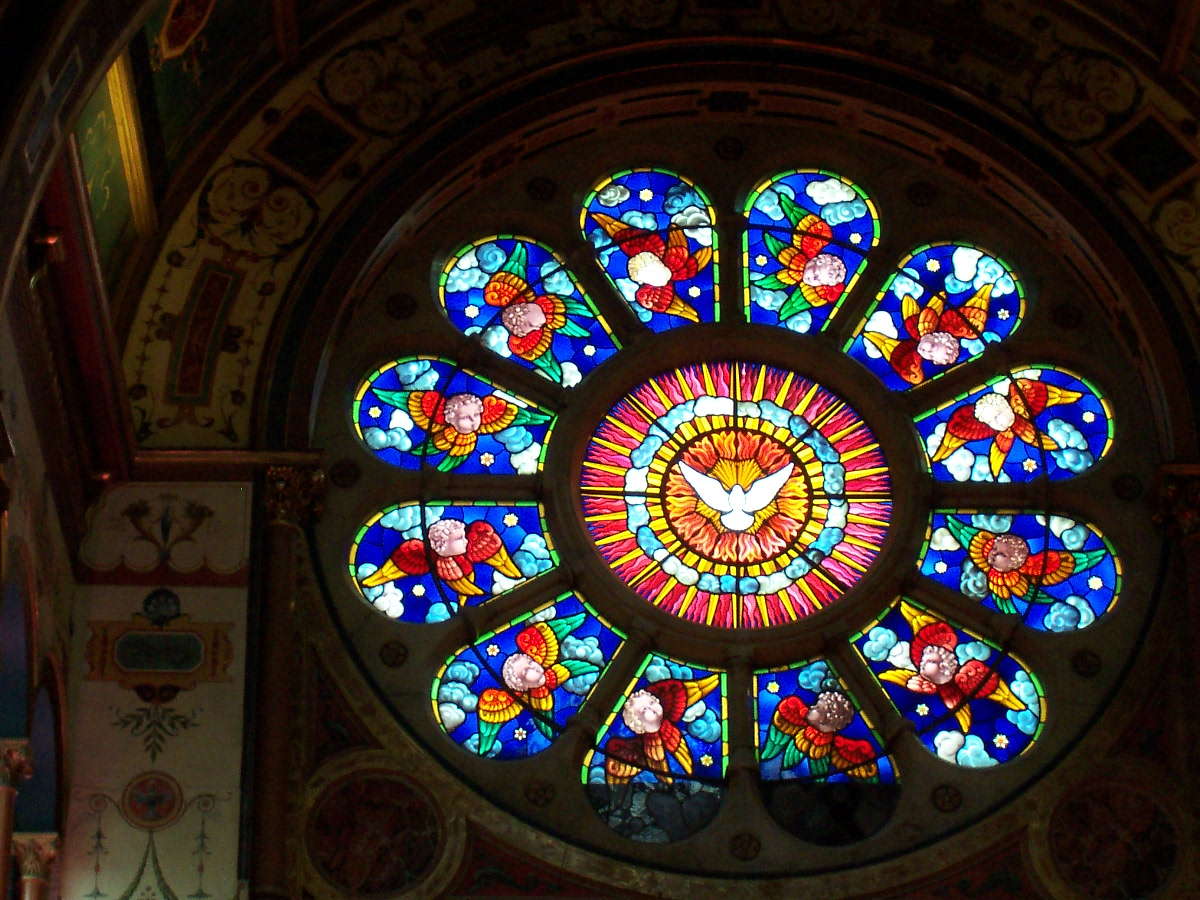
Medallion of the Holy Ghost, the centrepiece of the rose window at the east end of the Beaumont chapel. The chapel was built in 1870 by Joseph Hansom and decorated in 1902 by William Romaine-Walker, who described his style as "the grandchild of the Pompeian". It was the inspiration for the chapel in Evelyn Waugh's Brideshead Revisited. This window is a replacement: the original was destroyed by a doodlebug which landed on the school during the war.

Behind the war memorial, woodland ran down the edge of the estate, where there was a path leading to Windsor Great Park, much used by the pupils for walks and cross-country runs. In the angle between the woodland and the garden was the cricket pitch. A boathouse lay on the Thames just outside the gates, and playing fields for rugby football were a little further down river on Runnymede. Beyond the cricket pitch was a home farm which supplied the school with milk and other products, and beyond that St John's.

As in other public schools, sport was important; indeed, an annual cricket match was played at Lord's against the Oratory until 1965. Moreover, Beaumont held a number of sporting and similar distinctions. Only two public schools, Eton and Beaumont, came to send both their First Eleven to Lord's and their First Eight to Henley; and the first black player at Lord's was a Beaumont boy. When Pierre de Coubertin visited England in the course of researching the basis of his new Olympic movement, the four schools he looked at were Eton, Harrow, Rugby and Beaumont.

The Beaumont school Combined Cadet Force was the only one in the country to be affiliated to the Household Division – and had a Garter Star in the cap badge awarded by King George VI in recognition of the school's role in the Crown Land Battalion during WW2. The first motorist in England was the Hon Evelyn Ellis, who in 1885 drove a car from his home to Beaumont. Coco Chanel's nephew was a pupil, and the school blazer is said to have been the inspiration for the 1924 Chanel suit.

Beaumont was easy to access from London, and, being where it was, rapidly developed an awareness of being the "Catholic Eton": a tag at the school was "Beaumont is what Eton was: a school for the sons of Catholic gentlemen" (similar claims have been made for the Oratory, Stonyhurst and Ampleforth). Although all the boys at Beaumont were boarders, the school's nearness to London meant that, unlike at Stonyhurst or Ampleforth, many parents could fetch boys away for weekends during term; the number of such "exeats" was limited.

Prior to and during World War II, there were sufficient pupils to divide students into three separate Houses, Heathcote, Eccles and O'Hare, named after three previous Rectors. The respective 'House Colours' were brown, light blue and dark blue. However, Beaumont did not continue to be organised in such "Houses" as many British boarding schools are (cf Winchester, Harrow, or the fictional Hogwarts), but in various other ways: in this respect it resembled the other English Jesuit public school, Stonyhurst, but not St Aloysius' in Scotland. The main grouping was by year-class, the names of the classes being reminiscent of the medieval trivium: Rudiments, Grammar, Syntax, Poetry, and Rhetoric. There was also a broader age-division between the "Higher Line" and "Lower Line" (the cut-off being around the beginning of the sixth-form). Finally, all boys were on admission assigned either to be "Romans" or "Carthaginians": these two groups earned points during each term on the basis of the academic progress and behaviour of their members, and at the end of term there was a day's holiday at which the winning group earned a special tea (this last tradition lost force over the years and by the 1960s attracted little enthusiasm from the boys).

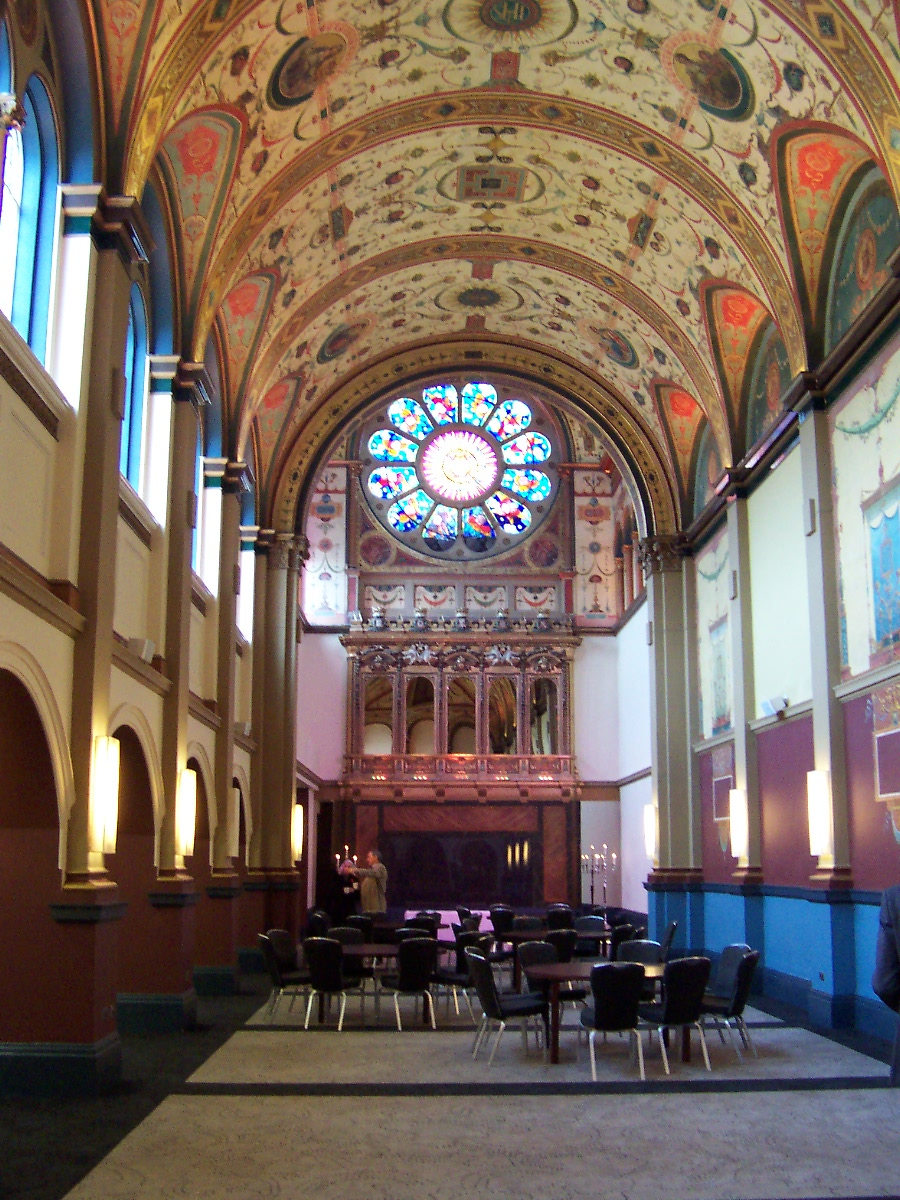
Beaumont chapel in 2008, restored as a function space.

Inevitably the school had its own song, put together in the late Victorian period in rather poor Latin:

Concinamus gnaviter

Omnes Beaumontani
Vocem demus suaviter
Novi, veterani;
Etsi mox pugnavimus
Iam condamus enses,
Seu Romani fuimus,
Seu Carthaginienses.
Numquam sit per saecula
Decus istud vanum:
Vivat sine macula

Nomen Beaumontanum!

The school had its own arms, with the motto Æterna non-Caduca (The eternal, not the earthly).

== End of the school ==
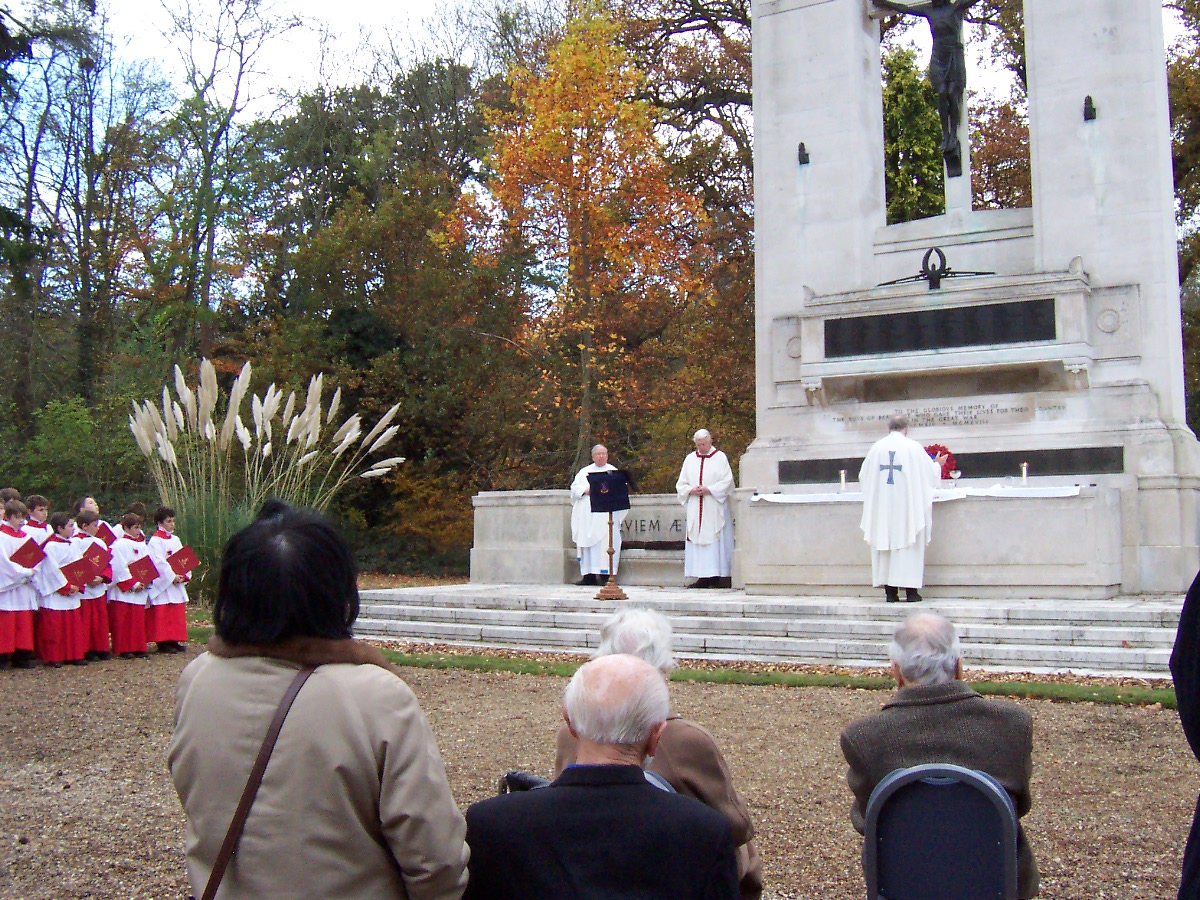
11 November 2007: Remembrance Day service at Beaumont's Scott war memorial. The St John's choir are to the left, and a tree planted by Queen Elizabeth II in 1961 is in the middle. Fr Kevin Donovan SJ OB (died 21 August 2008), on the right.

After the Second World War, the English Province of the Jesuits (which also had responsibilities in Rhodesia and British Guiana) suffered from an increasing shortage of priests. The financial viability of a school of only 280 pupils became more and more precarious. Moreover, by the 1960s the atmosphere of the Second Vatican Council was also lending weight to a feeling that the Order ought not to devote so large a part of its resources to the education of the better-off of the First World.

A decision was therefore made in 1965 to close the school. It finally shut in 1967, amid a storm of protest from parents and old boys who had been contributing to an appeal to fund an extension of the laboratories. This led among some to the colloquialism "Pulling a Beaumont", referring to an ability to cause mass confusion and protest in seemingly benign circumstance. After the closure, most of the current pupils transferred to Stonyhurst.

Immediately thereafter the building was borrowed for one academic year by the Loreto Sisters on account of delays to their new teacher training college. By the early 1970s, the building was owned by the British computer company ICL, which used it for many years as a training centre. In 2003 it was acquired by Hayley Conference Centres, which carried out much new building on the site with very extensive extensions and alterations, including the closure of the sweeping front drive. In 2008 Hayley restored the chapel as a function space. The property is now owned and operated by Principal Hotel Company under the brand name De Vere Beaumont Estate. A memorial to the dead of the South African War survives in the former Lower Line refectory.

The old boys' association, known as the Beaumont Union, continues, largely through the efforts of Robert Wilkinson and Guy Bailey, now resident in Monaco. Robert produces an on-line newsletter and there is an annual formal lunch at the Caledonian Club in London. The Beaumont Union also arranges an annual service each Remembrance Day at the Beaumont War Memorial. Members of the Beaumont Union and their families formed the London Beaumont Region of HCPT - The Pilgrimage Trust and are still involved with an annual pilgrimage to Lourdes, where the Beaumont crest hangs at the Le Cintra cafe in the rue Ste Marie.

== St John's Beaumont School ==
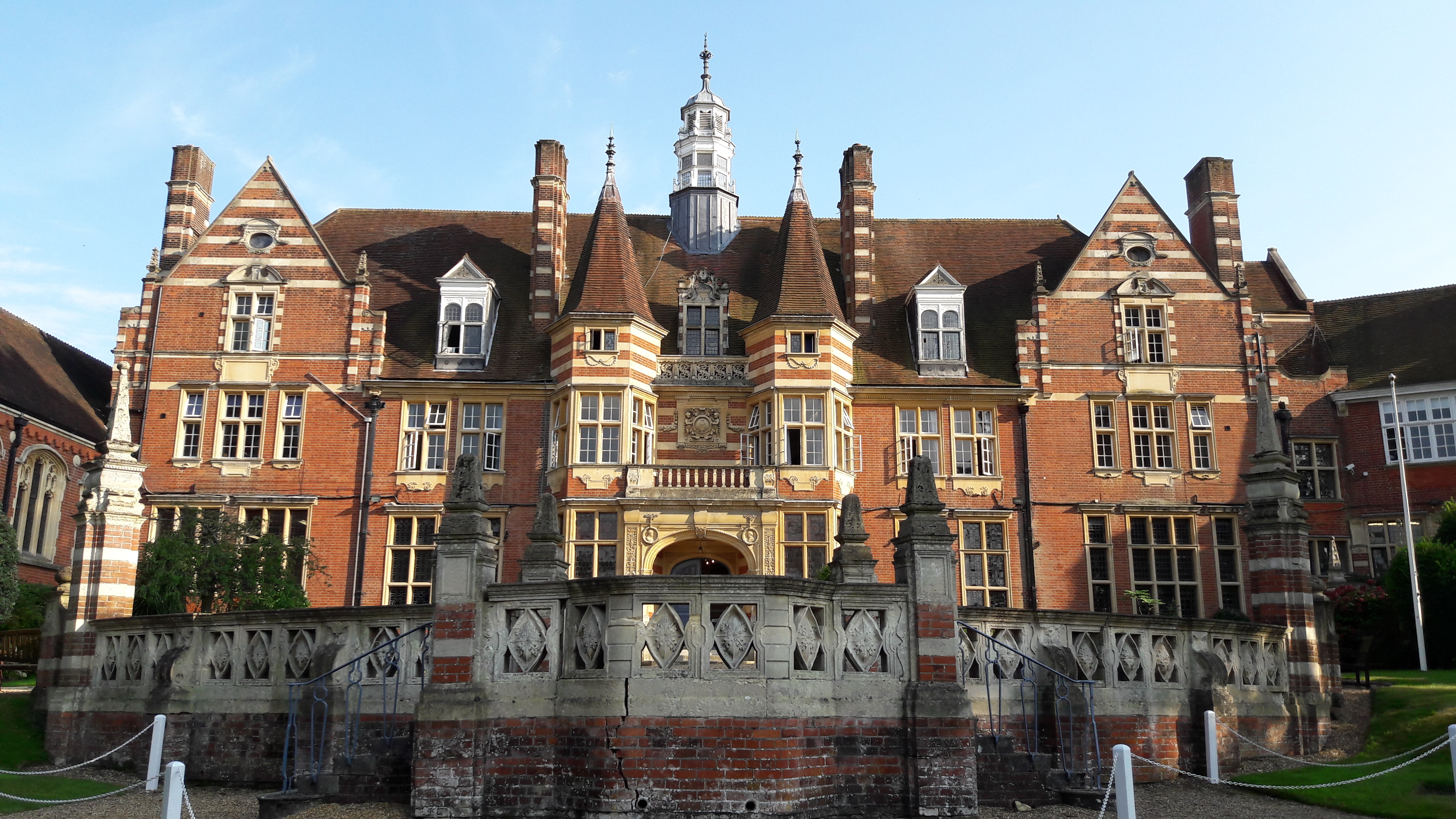
St John's Beaumont School

For some years a preparatory division was accommodated at Beaumont, but was found unsatisfactory, and Fr Frederick O'Hare, the Rector from 1884, commissioned John Francis Bentley to design a new preparatory school. This was erected nearby; it opened on 25 September 1888 under the name of St John's Beaumont, and is still a lively and successful school.

== Other notes ==
On 22 September 2007 cattle at Beaumont Farm were found with foot and mouth disease, in the course of the second outbreak following an escape of contamination from the Pirbright research establishment. The entire herd of 40 cattle was destroyed the same day.

== Notable old boys ==
- Sir John Audley Frederick Aspinall (1851–1937), British locomotive engineer.
- Ralph Bates (1940–1991), British actor.
- Fr. Charles Sidney Beauclerk (1855–1934), Parish Priest of Holywell, North Wales, from 1890 to 1898.
- Francis Beckett, British writer/author.
- Count Quentin Michael Algar de la Bedoyere (1934–2023), businessman, author and columnist for the Catholic Herald.
- Jaime de Borbón y de Borbón-Parma, called Duke of Madrid and known in France as Jacques de Bourbon, Duke of Anjou (27 June 1870 – 2 October 1931), the Carlist claimant to the throne of Spain under the name Jaime III and the Legitimist claimant to the throne of France under the name Jacques I.
- Prince Sixtus Henry of Bourbon-Parma (b. 1940), French legitimist prince and Carlist claimant to the Spanish throne.
- Noel Browne, Irish politician and Minister for Health.
- William F. Buckley Jr. (1925–2008), founder of the modern American conservative movement which laid the groundwork for the presidential candidacies of Barry Goldwater and Ronald Reagan.
- Hugh Burden (1913–1985), British actor
- Michael Burgess (b.1946), Coroner to the Royal Household.
- Sir Henry Burke (1859–1930); grandson of the founder of Burke's Peerage
- Captain Arthur Edward "Boy" Capel (1881–1919), British polo player
- Bernard Capes (1854–1918), novelist
- Ely Calil (1945–2018), Lebanese-British businessman
- Brigadier-General Edmund William Costello (1873–1949) recipient of the Victoria Cross
- Prince Réginald de Croÿ, (d.1961), the son of Prince Alfred Emmanuel de Croÿ-Solre, and a diplomat active in the Belgian Resistance in the First World War.
- John Bede Dalley (1876–1935), Australian journalist and writer.
- Nicholas Danby (1935–1997), British/US organist.
- Admiral Sir Gerald Dickens (1879–1962); Director of Naval Intelligence between WWI and WWII
- Peter Drummond-Murray of Mastrick (b.1929), Slains Pursuivant of Arms from 1981 to 2009
- General Sir Basil Eugster (1914–1984); Colonel of the Irish Guards
- Colonel Francis Fitzherbert-Stafford, 12th Baron Stafford (1859–1932), British army officer
- Stephen Fitz-Simon (1937–1997), co-founder of the fashion business "Biba" with wife Barbara Hulanicki.
- Bernard Arthur William Patrick Hastings Forbes, 8th Earl of Granard (1874–1948), known as Viscount Forbes from 1874 to 1889; Anglo-Irish soldier and Liberal politician, and Master of the Horse
- General Cuthbert Fuller (1874–1960). British Army engineering officer
- Monsignor Alfred Newman Gilbey (1901–1998), writer and chaplain to Cambridge University.
- Sonnie Hale (1902–1959), British actor
- Peter Hammill (b. 1948), musician and founding member of the progressive rock band Van der Graaf Generator
- Malcolm Hay (1881–1962); the last Laird of Seaton in Aberdeenshire; Director of Military Intelligence 1b in World War I; fundraiser for the relief of prisoners of war in Germany and Italy; historian and author (The Roots of Christian Anti-Semitism)
- George Hennessy, 1st Baron Windlesham (1877–1953), soldier and Conservative politician
- Christopher Hewett (1921–2001), British actor
- Peter Holman (b. 1946), conductor and musicologist, founder of The Parley of Instruments
- Simon Potter (b.1947) author and educationalist
- Sir Edward St. John Jackson, Lt-Governor of Malta during World War II and Nuremberg War Trials board member.
- Sir Christopher William Kelly (b.1946); former British Permanent Secretary, Chairman of the Committee on Standards in Public Life from 2008 to 2013, and Chairman of the NSPCC
- Sir John Knill (b.1856–1934); Lord Mayor of London in 1909–10 (the first Roman Catholic to hold the office since the Reformation)
- Desmond Knox-Leet (1923–1993), co-founder of perfumier Diptyque in Paris
- Charles Laughton (1899–1962), British-American film actor and director.
- Bernard Howell Leach (1887–1979); world-renowned potter based in St Ives, Cornwall
- Professor Sir Anthony Leggett (b. 1938); winner in 2003, Nobel Prize in Physics
- Luis Federico Leloir (1906–1987), Argentine doctor and biochemist who received the 1970 Nobel Prize in Chemistry
- Pat Le Marchand (1908–1977), first-class cricketer and British Indian Army officer
- Peter Levi (1931–2000); Oxford Professor of Poetry, author and critic
- General Sir George Macdonogh (1865–1942); Head of Military Intelligence in WWI
- Edward Martyn (1859–1923), Irish playwright, co-founder and first President of Sinn Féin (1905–08)
- Edward Molyneux (1891–1974), British fashion designer
- Terence O'Brien (1936–2022), New Zealand diplomat
- Patrick O'Byrne (1870–1944), Irish republican revolutionary and Sinn Féin politician
- George More O'Ferrall (1907–1982), film and television director
- Sir George Ogilvie-Forbes (1891–1954); British diplomat
- Percy O'Reilly (1870–1942), Silver medallist for polo at 1908 Olympics
- Alfonso de Orleans y Borbón (1886–1975), the Infante of Spain, and his younger brother Luís Fernando (1888–1945) were sent to England to be educated at Beaumont, where they remained from 1899 until 1904
- Sergio Osmeña III (b. 1943), Filipino politician
- Gilbert Pownall, British architect responsible for the mosaics in the Lady Chapel at Westminster Cathedral, son of F. H. Pownall.
- Jean Prouvost (1885–1978), French Government minister, industrialist, and founder of the magazine Paris Match
- Kynaston Reeves (1893–1971), British actor
- Prince Michael Andreevich of Russia (1920–2008), eldest grandson of HIH Grand Duke Alexander Mikhailovich; Grand Prior and Imperial Protector of The Sovereign Order of the Orthodox Knights Hospitaller of St. John of Jerusalem.
- Sir Francis Cyril Rose (1909–1979); British artist and aesthete
- Frank Russell, 2nd Lord Russell of Killowen (1867–1946); Lord Justice of Appeal
- Charles Ritchie Russell, 3rd Lord Russell of Killowen (1908–1986); Lord Justice of Appeal
- Philippe de Schoutheete, Belgian diplomat and ambassador.
- Sir Giles Gilbert Scott (1880–1960); British architect
- Sir Reginald Secondé (1922–2017); HM British Ambassador to Chile, Romania, and Venezuela
- Sir Patrick John Rushton Sergeant (1924–2024); British financial journalist.
- Lt-Col. Edward Lisle Strutt (1874–1948); British soldier and mountaineer
- Serjeant Sullivan, Irish and English lawyer (1872–1959)
- Colonel Sir Mark Sykes . (1879–1919); soldier, co-author of the Sykes–Picot Agreement
- Sir Hilary Synnott (1945–2011); British diplomat and author
- Basil Tozer (1868/1872–1949), English writer, author of horror stories and other works.
- Beauclerk Upington (1872–1938), son of Cape Colony PM, himself South African politician and MP.
- Pierre de Vomécourt (1906–1986), founder of the first SOE network in occupied France during WWII.
- Freddie Wolff (1910–1988); gold medallist in athletics in the 1936 Olympic games.
- Thomas F. Woodlock (1866–1945); editor of The Wall Street Journal and US Interstate Commerce Commission commissioner.
- Sir Philip de Zulueta (1925–1989), Private Secretary to the Prime Minister Harold Macmillan.
- Salvador Bermúdez de Castro y O'Lawlor (1863–1945), Spanish noble, politician and lawyer, who served as Minister of State.
