= Guy Le Marchand =

English cricketer

Personal information
- Full name: Harold Markham Le Marchand
- Born: 15 December 1901; Madras, Madras Presidency, British India
- Died: 31 December 1990 (aged 89); Wells, Somerset, England
- Batting: Unknown
- Bowling: Unknown
- Relatives: Pat Le Marchand (brother)

Domestic team information
- Years: Team
- 1921/22–1933/34: Europeans

Career statistics
Competition	First-class
Matches	5
Runs scored	55
Batting average	11.00
100s/50s	–/–
Top score	32
Balls bowled	450
Wickets	5
Bowling average	47.00
5 wickets in innings	–
10 wickets in match	–
Best bowling	3/36
Catches/stumpings	4/–
- Source: ESPNcricinfo, 15 November 2022

Harold 'Guy' Markham Le Marchand (15 December 1901 — 31 December 1990) was an English first-class cricketer and a trade commissioner for Australia.

The son of M. Le Marchand, a native of Devon, he was born in British India at Madras. He was educated in Australia at Launceston Grammar School. Returning to India, he played first-class cricket for the Europeans cricket team between 1922 and 1934, making five appearances in the Madras Presidency Matches. As a batsman, he scored 55 runs in his five matches at an average of exactly 11 and with a high score of 32. As a bowler, he took 5 wickets at a bowling average of exactly 47, with best figures of 3 for 36. Later returning to Australia, he held a number of trade commissioner posts for the Australian government. He was trade commissioner to the Federation of Rhodesia and Nyasaland from 1957 to 1960, and from 1961 he was appointed as trade commissioner to Beirut; he had previously served a vice-president of the Australian Exporters Federation. Le Marchand later retired to England, where he died in December 1990 at Wells, Somerset. His brother, Pat, was also a first-class cricketer.
