= Henry Emlyn =

English architect

Henry Emlyn (1729–1815) was an English architect.

== Life ==
Emlyn resided at Windsor. He was elected a Fellow of the Society of Antiquaries of London on 25 June 1795. He died at Windsor on 10 December 1815 and was buried nine days later in St George's Chapel. A tablet was erected to his memory in the Bray chantry.

== Works ==
Emlyn published A Proposition for a new Order in Architecture, with rules for drawing the several parts, London, 1781 (2nd and 3rd editions, 1784); this consisted 'of a shaft that at one-third of its height divided itself into two, the capitals having oak leaves for foliage, with the star of the order of the garter between the volutes.' He introduced this order (the point of division being covered by an escutcheon, and the foliage being replaced by ostrich plumes) in the porch of his own house, and in the tetrastyle portico at Beaumont Lodge, near Windsor, which (except part of the west wing) was erected by him for Henry Griffiths in 1790.

George III assigned to Emlyn some alterations in St George's Chapel, Windsor Castle, which were executed entirely after his designs in 1787–1790, and preserved a due harmony with the original work. The restoration included "the screen to the choir, executed in Coade stone, with the organ case, the altar, and the king's and additional stalls".
