= Raymond Ferrall =

Australian businessman and cricketer

Sir Raymond Ferrall CBE
- Born: Raymond Alfred Ferrall; 27 May 1906; Launceston, Tasmania, Australia
- Died: 1 June 2000 (aged 94); Newstead, Launceston, Tasmania, Australia
- Other name: R. A. Ferrall
- Education: Launceston Church Grammar School
- Occupations: Businessman, author and cricketer
- Spouses: Lorna Lyttleton Findlay (m. 1931; died 1987) Sallie Sinclair Barnett (nee Thyne) (m. 1988)

Sir Raymond Alfred Ferrall, CBE (27 May 1906 – 1 June 2000) was an Australian businessman, journalist, author and cricketer.

== Early life ==
Ferrall was born in Launceston, Tasmania, raised in the suburb of Invermay, and educated at Launceston Church Grammar School.

Ferrall played first-class cricket for Tasmania from 1933 to 1935, and was the team's captain in 1935.

In 1950, he stood as a candidate for the Tasmanian Legislative Council.

== Business career ==
After a stint as a journalist (which he would later chronicle in his memoir Partly Personal), Ferrall took a position as a commercial traveller to promote his father's grocery business nationally and overseas—a business he would later develop into the successful wholesaler Four Roses Foods. He served on the boards or held directorships of several Launceston businesses including the Launceston Bank for Savings (LBS), The Examiner newspaper, Boag's Brewery, and forestry company Gunns; and utilities such as the Launceston Gas Company and the Hydro-Electric Commission. He also served as President of the Launceston Chamber of Commerce from 1961 to 1962.

Ferrall was chairman of the board of Qintex when Christopher Skase made a successful takeover bid for the company. The company expanded to a huge conglomerate of entertainment and other companies, but famously collapsed in 1991 after Farrell had retired. He was also a foundation director of ENT Ltd., a Tasmanian entertainment and media company which expanded into other countries and interests. ENT was broken up and sold off after the company's founder Edmund Rouse was jailed for attempting to bribe a Tasmanian state MP.

== Writing career ==
Ferrall wrote under the pen name R. A. Ferrall, with his first book being a memoir of his time as a journalist: Partly Personal: Recollections of a One-Time Tasmanian Journalist was published in 1974 by Cat and Fiddle Press. His next book was a fiction novel entitled Idylls of the Mayor, published by Mary Fisher Bookshop in Launceston. In the early 1980s, he wrote two biographical compendiums of notable Tasmanians: Notable Tasmanians (1980) and Tasmanians All (1982), and another novel, The Age of Chiselry: In Eleven Slightly Irregular Escapades (1981). His last book, published in 1995 at the age of 90, was an autobiography titled 90 Years On: A Tasmanian Story.

== Personal life ==
Ferrall married Lorna Lyttleton Findlay on 10 June 1931, at St John's Church, Launceston. He was widowed in 1987 and married Sallie Sinclair Barnett (née Thyne) in 1988.

== Honours ==
Ferrall was made a Commander of the Order of the British Empire (CBE) in the 1969 Queen's Birthday Honours, for his role as warden of the Port of Launceston Authority. He was knighted in the 1982 New Year's Honours in recognition of service to industry, commerce and to the community.

Buildings on the University of Tasmania's Newnham campus and at the Launceston Church Grammar School are named the Sir Raymond Ferrall Centre and the Sir Raymond Ferrall Building, respectively, in his honour.

== See also ==
- List of Tasmanian representative cricketers
