= Albert Rains (cricketer) =

New Zealand cricketer (1865–1947)

Personal information
- Full name: Albert George Rains
- Born: 7 February 1865; Melbourne, Victoria, Australia
- Died: 17 July 1947 (aged 82); Perth, Western Australia
- Role: Wicketkeeper

Domestic team information
- Years: Team
- 1894/95–1896/97: Otago

Career statistics
Competition	First-class
Matches	5
Runs scored	110
Batting average	12.22
100s/50s	0/1
Top score	55
Balls bowled	130
Wickets	1
Bowling average	53.00
5 wickets in innings	0
10 wickets in match	0
Best bowling	1/16
Catches/stumpings	5/2
- Source: Cricinfo, 22 May 2016

Albert George Rains (7 February 1865 – 17 July 1947) was a New Zealand cricketer. He played five first-class matches between the 1894–95 and 1896–97 seasons. He was later a businessman in Perth, Australia.

== Cricket career ==
Rains played as a wicketkeeper for South Melbourne in Melbourne district cricket from 1889–90 to 1893–94. He moved to Dunedin in 1894, working there for the Sargood retail company, and began playing for the Carisbrook club in 1894–95. Carisbrook won the Dunedin championship in 1894–95, Rains leading the batting with 527 runs at an average of 47.9 and taking 22 wickets at an average of 9.7.

He played his first match for Otago in December 1894 as a bowling all-rounder. In subsequent matches he kept wicket. When New South Wales played Otago on their tour of New Zealand in 1895–96 he scored 32 opening the batting in the second innings, Otago's highest score in the match.

Rains was selected to play for New Zealand in the match against New South Wales in Christchurch a week later, and played a major part in New Zealand's first-ever victory. He opened the batting on the first morning and made 55 in three hours while wickets fell around him to the bowling of Sydney Callaway. He was sixth out when the score was 114. It was the highest score on either side in the match. When New South Wales batted, he did not concede a bye in either innings.

== Later life ==
Rains moved to Perth in late 1896, co-managing the Sargood branch there. Later, with his company A. G. Rains and Co., he represented the billiard-table manufacturers Alcock and Co.; in 1934 he organised a series of exhibition matches Walter Lindrum played in Western Australia. In July 1947, while living in West Perth, he collapsed in the street in the centre of Perth and died.
