= Rochford Devenish-Meares =

Australian rules footballer (1948–2026)

Personal information
- Full name: Rochford John Devenish-Meares
- Born: 23 March 1948
- Died: 19 August 2026 (aged 78)
- Original team: Launceston Grammar
- Height: 187 cm (6 ft 2 in)
- Weight: 83 kg (183 lb)
- Position: Key-position

Playing career
Years	Club	Games (Goals)
1968	Hawthorn	8 (1)
1973–1978	Subiaco	43 (19)

Career highlights
- Subiaco premiership player: 1973

Rochford John Devenish-Meares (23 March 1948 – 19 August 2026) was an Australian rules footballer who played with Hawthorn in the Victorian Football League (VFL) and Subiaco in the Western Australian National Football League (WANFL).

== Hawthorn ==
Devenish-Meares, a Launceston Grammar recruit, was a key position player. He came to Hawthorn from Tasmania in 1967, along with the more high profile Peter Hudson, with whom he boarded. A broken bone in his foot, sustained in a practice match, stopped him from making his debut in 1967.

He played eight senior games for Hawthorn, all of them in succession in the 1968 VFL season. His debut, against South Melbourne in round two, finished in a draw. In round eight against reigning premiers Richmond he thought he had played in another draw, memorably kicking a goal in the dying minutes which put Hawthorn level on the scoreboard. Having come on as a reserve, Devenish-Meares kicked the ball from 60-yards out and it was shepherded through by Hudson, for what would be the only goal of his VFL career. The sides remained tied on the scoreboard when the siren sounded two-minutes later. Soon after in the change rooms, when the players were celebrating a drawn game that they had been expected to lose, even singing the team song, it was revealed that the score on the board was an error and Richmond had actually won by a point. It transpired that a behind earlier in the fourth quarter by Hawthorn's Peter Chilton had been given two-points instead of one.

== Later career ==
Devenish-Meares also played some football for Geelong, but not seniors, and in 1971 was reported to be training with Fitzroy.

From 1973 to 1978, Devenish-Meares played for Subiaco in the WANFL. He was a member of Subiaco's 1973 premiership team.

== Personal life and death ==
Devenish-Meares was married to Caroline, with whom he had three children: Rachel, Ranin and Leycester. He died at home on 19 August 2026, having had Parkinson's disease and dementia.
