= Launceston Church Grammar School =

Location
- Launceston, Tasmania; Australia; 41°24′29″S 147°7′39″E

Information
- Type: Independent, co-educational, day & boarding
- Motto: Latin: Nisi Dominus Frustra (Unless the Lord is with us, our labour is in vain)
- Denomination: Anglican
- Established: 1846; 180 years ago
- Chair: Fiona Woolcock
- Principal: Dale Bennett
- Chaplain: Rev'd Alistair Crouch
- Staff: 155
- Enrolment: 838 (PK–12)
- Colours: Blue, black & white
- Slogan: Nurture, Challenge, Inspire
- Affiliation: Sports Association of Tasmanian Independent Schools
- Alumni: Old Launcestonians
- Website: www.lcgs.tas.edu.au

Launceston Church Grammar School (informally Launceston Grammar or simply Grammar, commonly abbreviated to LCGS) is an Anglican co-educational private school in Launceston, Tasmania, Australia for Early Learning through to Grade 12.

Although founded in 1846, the present school was formed in 1982 from the amalgamation of the boys' Launceston Grammar School and girls' Broadland House Church of England Girls' Grammar School. The school celebrated its 175th birthday on the 15th of June 2021 and retains its longevity, being the longest continuously running independent school in Australia and Tasmania, and being the oldest form of private secondary education in Tasmania. The school is also the second-oldest form of education in Tasmania, after Christ College, Tasmania, the oldest form of education in Australia, now used as a residential college of the University of Tasmania.

Launceston Grammar is affiliated with Association of Heads of Independent Schools of Australia (AHISA), the Independent Primary School Heads of Australia (IPSHA), the Australian Boarding Schools' Association (ABSA), and the Sports Association of Tasmanian Independent Schools (SATIS).

The school competes mainly with Scotch Oakburn College and St Patrick's College, Launceston for student numbers, the three being the only large-scale private schools in Launceston.

The school is widely regarded as one of Australia's most prestigious schools: from 2001 to 2004 The Australian listed Launceston Church Grammar School among the top ten schools in the country, and in 2010 The Age reported that Launceston Grammar ranked equal tenth among Australian schools based on the number of alumni who had received a top Order of Australia honour.

Collectable Australian School Cigarette card featuring the school colours & crest, c. 1920s

== History ==
On 15 June 1846, the school was founded and Henry Plow Kane was chosen as its founding headmaster. The school began in temporary premises on the North-East corner of George and Elizabeth Streets, but soon after commenced building on the site immediately behind St John's Church. And so began an enduring and close relationship between St John's Church and the Launceston Church Grammar School.

On the day after Grammar opened its doors, 24 boys of varying ages were enrolled and Launceston was described as "a small town with a population of about 8000 people and the town was little more than a scattered village." In 1848 the visitor, the first Anglican Bishop of Tasmania, Francis Russell Nixon, came to the school and a soiree was held in his honour. The current bishop of Tasmania continues this tradition as the visitor and comes annually to the school.

In 1884 the new headmaster was Arthur Hammerton Champion. He had just married Mary the sister of Annie Jane Duncan who would become a factory inspector in Britain and Australia,

An independent school known as Launceston High School existed from 1884 until 1912. It was founded by Edward Alleyne Nathan, who had been a teacher at Launceston Church Grammar School. This school was established at Milton Hall in Frederick Street, Launceston. Nathan remained as headmaster of the school until 1899, when he was succeeded by R. Ernest Smith. Launceston High School eventually merged with Launceston Church Grammar School. The alumni of both schools held joint reunions as the Old Launcestonians' Association after the schools merger.

In 1896, Launceston Church Grammar School celebrated its 50th year under the headmasters the Revd Christopher Wilkinson and Mr Harry Gillett with a jubilee service at St John's and a grand ceremony in the Albert Hall. By 1920 the school had outgrown its site, and in 1924 its ninth headmaster, John Bethune, presided over the only major move in the school's history when it went from Elizabeth Street to a new 25-acre site on Stephenson's Farm in Mowbray – purchased for 2,000 pounds.

The school community suffered deeply during the war years as students served their country, many making the ultimate sacrifice. Headmaster, Captain Norman Roff was amongst those killed in World War II action. The next major milestone for the school was its centenary in 1946 under Headmaster Harold Vernon Jones. Although the school by now had built its own chapel, history records that "the final Centenary celebration was a church service held in the original church which School members attended, and two hundred present scholars and two hundred and fifty Old Boys lined up outside the old School in Elizabeth Street and marched to St John's Church, as Grammar boys had done for so many years." This was an emotional occasion for many Old Boys as they relived their youth, and the bishop gave an inspiring address to the congregation of a thousand, telling them they must develop international fellowship.

The past 50 years have brought further major milestones for the school. One was the move to co-education in 1972. Although 100 years before, in 1872, two girls Edith Savigny and Mary Archer both attended Grammar for several years. In 1899, the enrolment was recorded as 150 boys and one girl – Joyce Wilkinson. In 1921, Charlie Irvine, daughter of the Matron, Mrs Irvine, also attended the school. In 1983 Grammar amalgamated with the Broadland House Church of England Girls' Grammar School. Broadland House itself beginning in the 1840s. Broadland House is honoured with a memorial window in St John's Church.

== Headmasters ==
Period	Details
1846–1860	Rev H. P. Kane
1860–1863	Rev F. W. Quilter
1864–1871	Rev W. A. Brooke
1872–1885	Rev W. H. Savigny
1885–1895	Rev A. H. Champion
1895–1915	Mr R. H. Gillett
1915–1917	Rev F. Shann
1895–1918	Rev C. G. Wilkinson
1919–1928	Rev J. W. Bethune
1929–1935	Mr F. R. Adams
1936–1940	Capt. N. H. Roff
1940–1952	Mr H. V. Jones
1953–1958	Mr B. H. Travers
1959–1971	Mr D. V. Selth
1971–1978	Mr R. P. Hutchings
1979–1980	Mr J. B. Windeyer
1981–1993	Mr C. S. Strong
1994–2002	Mr P. A. B. Welch
2003–2017	Mr R. S. J. Norris
2018–2022	Mr R. C. Ford
2023–present	Mr D. A. Bennett

== Campuses ==
The Senior Campus is located in the suburb of Mowbray Heights, Launceston and caters for students in Grades 7 – 12. This site includes the School Chapel, Poimena Art Gallery, School Hall, Gymnasium, Boarding House and Swimming Pool. The chapel is a popular location for weddings.

The Junior Campus is located at the old Broadland House site on the corner of Lyttleton Street and Elphin Road, East Launceston. The campus was redeveloped in 2010.

== Sport ==
Launceston Church Grammar School is a member of the Sports Association of Tasmanian Independent Schools (SATIS).

=== SATIS premierships ===
Launceston Church Grammar School has won the following SATIS premierships.

Combined:

- Swimming (5) – 2008, 2009, 2011, 2012, 2013

Boys:

- Athletics – 1973
- Cricket (30) – 1924, 1925, 1927, 1935, 1943, 1944, 1945, 1947, 1948, 1950, 1951, 1953, 1954, 1955, 1957, 1959, 1960, 1961, 1966, 1972, 1976, 1982, 1983, 1988, 1992, 2000, 2008, 2009, 2011, 2019
- Football (6) – 1963, 1965, 1970, 1971, 1978, 1998
- Hockey (2) – 1964, 1966
- Rowing – 1978
- Rowing Eight (18) – 1919, 1920, 1921, 1922, 1925, 1936, 1938, 1946, 1947, 1952, 1954, 1955, 1956, 1963, 1976, 1977, 1978, 1979
- Soccer – 2000
- Swimming (12) – 1962, 1970, 1971, 1972, 1973, 1974, 1975, 2009, 2011, 2012, 2013, 2014
- Tennis (7) – 1976, 1977, 1978, 1979, 1990, 1997, 1999

Girls:

- Athletics (2) – 1987, 2008
- Basketball (4) – 2009, 2010, 2012, 2013
- Hockey (5) – 1984, 1985, 1987, 1988, 1989
- Rowing – 2013
- Rowing Eight (6) – 2005, 2010, 2011, 2012, 2013, 2014
- Soccer (2) – 2018, 2021
- Softball (8) – 1982, 1989, 1995, 1996, 1997, 2002, 2015, 2016
- Swimming – 2008
- Tennis (6) – 1985, 1986, 1987, 1992, 1994, 1995

== National and international links ==
One of the Launceston Church Grammar School's aims is to provide a globally relevant education. As such, the school is home to many international students, and has formed international links with countries including:

- Bolivia
- England
- France
- Germany
- India
- Ireland
- Japan
- Nepal
- New Caledonia
- Scotland
- Singapore
- South Africa
- Tanzania
- United States of America

Several exchanges also take place during the year, to countries including England, the United States, Germany and Japan. The school is, in turn, visited each year by three international schools, six mainland schools, and four other Tasmanian schools.

The school's past and present sister and brother schools include Hutchins School, St Michael's Collegiate School, Geelong Grammar School, Melbourne Grammar School, Charterhouse School, Eton College, Harrow School, Rugby School, St Paul's School, Sherborne School for Girls, Shrewsbury School, Westminster Abbey Choir School, Winchester College, Osaka International School and The Barstow School.

== Notable alumni ==
Alumni of the Launceston Church Grammar School (and its predecessors) are known as Old Launcestonians. All students who have attended Launceston Grammar automatically become members of the Old Launcestonians' Association (OLA), the organisation which represents former scholars of the school. Grade 12 valedicts are awarded life membership of the OLA, and honorary membership is bestowed upon all staff members who serve 10 years or more.

=== Business ===
- Sir Lindesay Clark – Mining engineer and company director
- Sir Norman Coles – former managing director and chairman of the Coles Group, and deputy chairman of Kmart Australia
- Sir Raymond Ferrall – Tasmanian businessman and author
- Sir Hudson Fysh – founder of Qantas
- Sir Warren McDonald KBE – Tasmanian engineer and industrialist
- Sir Donald von Bibra – former chairman of the Australian Wool Industry Conference and Tasmanian grazier
- David Warren AO – Inventor of the flight data recorder
- John Youl – Tasmanian grazier and motor racing driver

=== Clergy ===
- Oliver Heyward – former Anglican Bishop of Bendigo
- David McCall – former Anglican Bishop of Willochra and Bishop of Bunbury
- Cecil Muschamp – former Anglican Bishop of Kalgoorlie and Dean of Brisbane

=== Entertainment, media architecture and the arts ===
- Jack Carington Smith – Visual artist
- Rafe Champion – writer
- Pip Courtney – journalist and television personality
- Bob Danvers-Walker – Radio and newsreel announcer
- Don Kay – classical composer
- Indira Naidoo – journalist and former SBS newsreader
- Peter Sculthorpe – Australian composer, orchestral and chamber musician
- Thomas Pollard Sampson – architect

=== Government, politics and the law ===
- Arthur Anderson – Labor politician
- Brian Archer – Liberal Senator for Tasmania
- Bridget Archer – Liberal politician (current Federal Member for Bass)
- Thomas Archer IV – Longford councillor, landowner and grazier
- John Avery – former barrister who defended Martin Bryant
- Guy Barnett – Liberal politician (current State Member for Bass)
- Arthur Beck – UAP politician and Hobart alderman
- Sir Angus Bethune – former premier of Tasmania
- Sir Henry Braddon KBE – Diplomat, businessman and rugby union player
- Cyril Cameron – AIF colonel and Liberal politician
- Norman Cameron – Tasmanian politician
- Richard Casey – Queensland politician
- Bob Cheek – former Tasmanian Opposition Leader
- George Collins – Tasmanian politician and lawyer
- Ewan Crawford – former chief justice of Tasmania and lieutenant governor
- Sir George Crawford – former justice of the Supreme Court of Tasmania
- Sir John George Davies – Tasmanian politician and cricketer
- Charles Fenton – former President of the Tasmanian Legislative Council
- Janie Finlay – Labor politician (current State Member for Bass), former mayor of Launceston
- Stephen FitzGerald AO – Diplomat and former Australian Ambassador to China
- Francis Foster – Tasmanian politician
- Sir Guy Green – former governor of Tasmania and Chief Justice of Tasmania
- Ralph Harry – jurist, diplomat and former Australian ambassador to the United Nations
- Ross Hart – Labor politician (former Federal Member for Bass) and lawyer
- William Hartnoll – Tasmanian politician and businessman
- Sir Denham Henty – Tasmanian politician
- Sir Barry Holloway – Papua New Guinean politician
- Eric Hutchinson – Liberal politician (former Federal Member for Lyons) and former administrator of Norfolk Island
- John William Israel – former Commonwealth Auditor-General
- Sir Claude James – Tasmanian politician, former Agent-General in London and Mayor of Launceston
- Peter Jones – former National Country Party/Liberal politician (former Member of the Western Australian Legislative Council for Narrogin)
- John Loone – Independent politician (former Member of the Tasmanian Legislative Council for Tamar, Roland and Rowallan)
- John Marriott – former Liberal Senator and Assistant Minister
- Sir Laurence McIntyre – former Australian Ambassador to Malaya, Indonesia, Japan and the United Nations
- Campbell Newman – former Lord Mayor of Brisbane and Premier of Queensland
- Peter Rae AO – former Liberal Senator
- Neil Robson – Tasmanian politician who proposed the Robson Rotation
- Jeremy Rockliff – Liberal politician (current Premier of Tasmania)
- T. J. Ryan (former teacher) – former premier of Queensland
- Tony Rundle – former premier of Tasmania
- Burford Sampson – Liberal politician
- Warwick Smith – former Liberal politician (former Federal Member for Bass)
- Albert Solomon – former Liberal politician (former Premier of Tasmania, former State Member for Bass)
- Alison Standen – former Labor politician (former State Member for Franklin, succeeded by current Labor Leader, The Hon. Dean Winter MP)
- John Steer – former Liberal politician (former State Member for Bass, and Liberal Candidate for Cornwall in the Legislative Council)
- Allan Taylor – former director of ASIO and diplomat
- John Tucker – former Liberal/Independent politician (former State Member for Lyons)
- David Wordsworth – former Liberal politician (former Member of the Western Australian Legislative Council for the Agricultural Region)
- Richard Youl – Public servant, coroner and surgeon

=== Military ===
- Mary Bell – Founding leader of the Women's Air Training Corps (WATC)
- Richard Lamacraft – former director of intelligence operations and rear admiral of the Royal Australian Navy
- David Mattingley – bomber pilot and Distinguished Flying Cross recipient

=== Science ===
- Elizabeth Blackburn – Nobel laureate and biologist
- Derek Denton – Research scientist
- Mollie Holman – Physiologist and fellow of the Australian Academy of Science
- Hedley Wright – Australia's first professor of bacteriology

=== Sport ===
- Gabe Bell – Australian cricketer
- Justin Boocock – Olympic slalom canoeist
- David Boon – Test cricketer
- George Bailey – Test cricketer, former captain of Australian T20 team and member of Australian ODI team
- George Challis – VFL footballer
- Rochford Devenish-Meares – VFL footballer
- James Faulkner – Cricketer for Tasmania, Australia and Rajasthan Royals
- Peter Faulkner – first-class Cricketer for Australia
- Brad Green – Development coach (Carlton Football Club) and former AFL player (Melbourne Demons)
- David Lean – Olympic silver medallist and Commonwealth Games gold medalists in 4 × 400 m relay and 440-yard hurdles
- Ryan Lees – Australian cricketer
- Guy Le Marchand – English cricketer
- David Macpherson – Tennis doubles specialist
- Ted Pickett – Cricketer for Tasmania
- Claude Rock – first-class Cricketer for Cambridge
- Basil Travers (former Headmaster) – Cricketer and England National rugby player
- Tom Triffitt – Cricketer for Western Australia and Perth Scorchers
- Ciona Wilson – national representative rower
- Alex Viney – Australian paralympic rower
- Joe Wilson – VFA footballer and MCC cricketer
- Simon Youl – International tennis player

== See also ==
- List of schools in Tasmania
- List of boarding schools
- Education in Tasmania
