= Thomas Hastings (cricketer) =

Australian cricketer

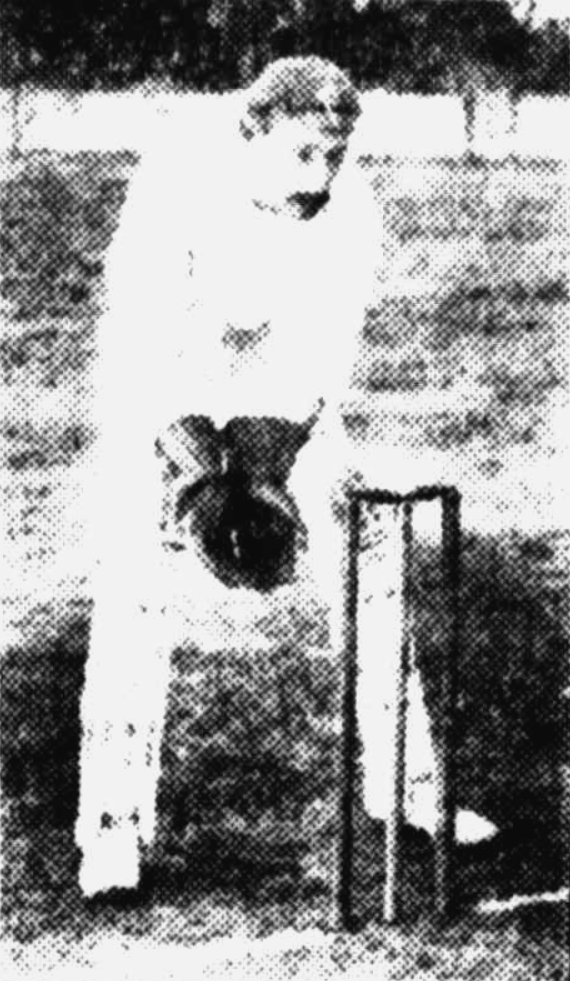

Personal information
- Born: 16 January 1865; Melbourne, Australia
- Died: 14 June 1938 (aged 73); Brighton, Victoria, Australia

Domestic team information
- Years: Team
- 1887-1909: Victoria
- Source: Cricinfo, 25 July 2015

Thomas Hastings (16 January 1865 – 14 June 1938) was an Australian cricketer. He played 15 first-class cricket matches for Victoria between 1887 and 1909. Hastings was the first player batting at number 11 in to score a century in a first-class match, with 106 not out against South Australia at Melbourne in January 1903.

== See also ==
- List of Victoria first-class cricketers
