= George Beacham =

Australian cricketer

Personal information
- Born: 27 October 1867; Queensland, Australia
- Died: 11 January 1925 (aged 57); South Fitzroy, Australia

Domestic team information
- Years: Team
- 1898: Victoria
- Source: Cricinfo, 27 July 2015

George Beacham (27 October 1867 – 11 January 1925) was an Australian cricketer. He played one first-class cricket match for Victoria in 1898.

== See also ==
- List of Victoria first-class cricketers
