= Isaac Drape =

Australian cricketer

Personal information
- Full name: Isaac Selby Drape
- Born: 13 May 1866; Hotham, Victoria, Australia
- Died: 7 February 1916 (aged 49); St Kilda, Victoria, Australia
- Batting: Right-handed

Domestic team information
- Years: Team
- 1893/94: Victoria
- 1894/95: Queensland
- Source: Cricinfo, 26 July 2015

Isaac Selby Drape (13 May 1866 – 7 February 1916) was an Australian cricketer. He played two first-class cricket matches—one for Victoria and one for Queensland, both in 1894.

== See also ==
- List of Victoria first-class cricketers
