= Willie Over =

Australian cricketer

Personal information
- Born: 20 January 1862; Melbourne, Australia
- Died: 10 November 1910 (aged 48); Krugersdorp, South Africa

Domestic team information
- Years: Team
- 1887-1890: Victoria
- Source: Cricinfo, 25 July 2015

Willie Over (20 January 1862 – 10 November 1910) was an Australian cricketer. He played four first-class cricket matches for Victoria between 1887 and 1890.

== See also ==
- List of Victoria first-class cricketers
