= North Melbourne Advertiser =

Former newspaper in Melbourne, Victoria, Australia

The North Melbourne Advertiser was a local newspaper distributed throughout the inner-northern suburbs of Melbourne, Australia, especially within the boundaries of what was then known as the borough of Hotham (later becoming the suburb of North Melbourne in 1887).

First published in 1873, the North Melbourne Advertiser was a four-page broadsheet costing one penny and was initially issued each Friday, with later editions being issued three times a week. Regular reporting included political news, social events and sports. Like many newspapers of its time it contained an abundance of advertisements, mostly for goods and services located throughout Hotham.

During the newspaper's run, borough of Hotham councillors were known to prompt electoral opinion through the publication of savage editorials and letters to the editor.

The North Melbourne Advertiser ceased publishing in 1894.

== See also ==
- List of newspapers in Australia
