= John Healy (cricketer) =

Australian cricketer

Personal information
- Full name: John Joseph Healy
- Born: 23 June 1851; Burra, South Australia
- Died: 17 May 1916 (aged 64); Melbourne, Victoria
- Batting: Right-handed

Domestic team information
- Years: Team
- 1880/81: Victoria
- Source: Cricinfo, 22 July 2015

John Healy (23 June 1851 – 17 May 1916) was an Australian cricketer. He played two first-class cricket matches, including one for Victoria.
