= Donald Macdonald (journalist) =

Australian journalist (1859–1932)

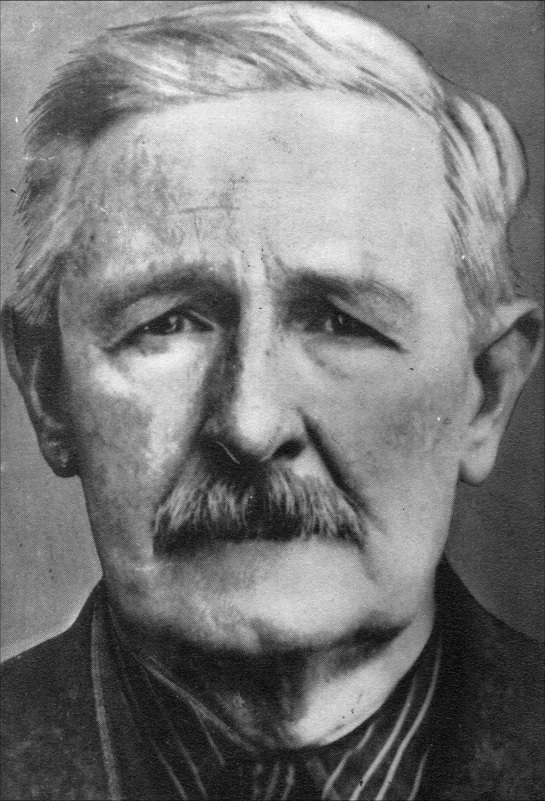
- Macdonald c. 1920
- Born: 6 June 1859; Fitzroy, Victoria, Australia
- Died: 23 November 1932 (aged 73); Black Rock, Victoria
- Education: Keilor state school
- Occupations: Journalist, war correspondent, sports writer, nature writer
- Spouse: Jessie Seward
- Children: 1

Donald Alaster Macdonald (6 June 1859 – 23 November 1932) was an Australian journalist and nature writer, writing under the pen names including 'Observer' and 'Gnuyang' (gossip). He was considered one of Australia's most widely known journalists, and is in the Melbourne Press Club's Australian Media Hall of Fame. He was credited with making "Australian natural history and botany popular interests".

== Early life ==
Macdonald was born in Fitzroy, Victoria, a suburb of Melbourne, the oldest son of Donald Macdonald, who was of Scottish–Canadian heritage, and his wife Margaret, née Harris. Macdonald was educated at the Keilor state school where he became a pupil-teacher in 1876. He later joined The Corowa Free Press and then the Melbourne Argus newspaper in 1881.

On 26 February 1883 at Scots' Church, Melbourne, Macdonald married Jessie Seward. Seward was from a pioneering family who had settled the Rochester area of Victoria. Their only daughter (J)essie Elaine (1885–2 July 1948), married in 1910 to James Service Northam Whittle, also became a traveller and free lance journalist (writing under the pen name 'Taunton Vale').

== Career ==
Writing under the pen name 'Observer', Macdonald established himself as a cricket and Australian rules football commentator. Macdonald "completely revolutionized cricket reporting" — he made the reports more vivid than the earlier over-by-over style.

Macdonald was first Australian war correspondent at the South African War; during the war he was besieged at Ladysmith. Macdonald's despatches from Ladysmith were eventually sent to Australia and published in the Argus. Later they were reprinted in a book How we kept the flag flying: The story of the siege of Ladysmith (1900). He returned to Australia in April–May 1900.

Macdonald established a weekly column in the Argus called 'Nature Notes and Queries'; in 1909 it was extended to 'Notes for Boys'. Macdonald also published the Bush Boy's Book (1911), enlarged in four more editions in 1927–33; a nature book for children, At the End of the Moonpath (1922); and his daughter made a selection of his writings in The Brooks of Morning (1933). Macdonald also compiled the Tourists' Handbook of Australia (1905) and wrote a novel, The Warrigal's Well (1901), in collaboration with John F. Edgar.

== Later years ==
Macdonald died at his residence The Huts, Karrakatta Street, Black Rock, Victoria (a seaside suburb of Melbourne), on 23 November 1932, had a private funeral and cremation, and was survived by his daughter.

== Memorials ==
By May 1937 the Sandringham municipal council had purchased land at Black Rock to be used as a bird sanctuary as the 'Donald Macdonald Park'. The park today is an area between Fourth, Stawell, and Keating Streets, and Haydens Road. Within the reserve is a playing field, skate park, playground, and the Beaumaris scout den.

Additionally, a large memorial bird bath bearing his portrait in bronze was unveiled on Sunday 17 December 1939 at the Black Rock park by his daughter who had just returned from England. It was designed by sculptor Stanley Hammond, following contributions of many readers of The Argus and The Australasian from 1937. The plaque read:

Donald MacDonald, friend of the creatures of the wild, chose this district in which to live and to end his days.

Born at Fitzroy 1857, died at Black Rock 1932.

Erected by readers of his "Nature Notes" in the Argus.

The memorial bird bath is at the western end of the park on Haydens Road opposite Wattle Avenue.

== Bibliography ==
- Gum boughs and wattle blooms (1888)
- How we kept the flag flying: The story of the siege of Ladysmith (1900)
- The Warrigal's Well (1901), a novel with John F. Edgar
- Tourists' Handbook of Australia (1905)
- Bush Boy's Book (1911)
- At the end of the moonpath (1922), the funds raised 'provided a tidy income for the Royal Children's Hospital'
- The brooks of morning (1933), compiled by Macdonald's daughter after his death
