= Arthur (surname) =

Arthur is a surname. Notable people with the surname include:

- Alex Arthur (born 1978), Scottish boxer
- Alexander Arthur (1846–1912), Scottish-born engineer and entrepreneur in the United States
- Alexander Creighton Arthur, 19th-century Member of Parliament in New Zealand
- André Arthur (1943–2022), Canadian politician and radio host
- Anthony Arthur (author) (1937–2009), American author
- Anthony Arthur (weightlifter) (born 1973), British weightlifter
- Basil Arthur (1928–1985), New Zealand politician
- Beatrice Arthur (1922–2009), American actor
- Ben Arthur (musician) (born 1973), American singer-songwriter
- Benjamin Arthur (animator) (born 1982), American animator
- Brad Arthur (born 1974), Australian rugby league football coach
- Brigid Arthur (born 1934), Australian nun and litigation guardian
- Carol Arthur (1935–2020), American actor
- Charles Arthur (1808–1884), Australian cricketer
- Charlie Arthur (1863–1924), Welsh rugby player
- Chester A. Arthur (1829–1886), American politician and 21st president of the United States
- Christine Arthur (born 1963), New Zealand hockey player
- Clara Arthur (1858–1929), American suffragist
- Darrell Arthur (born 1988), American basketball player
- Desmond Arthur (1884–1913), Irish aviator
- Elizabeth Barr Arthur (1884–1971), American poet, author, journalist, librarian, suffragist
- Eric Arthur (1898–1982), Canadian architect
- Fred Arthur (born 1961), Canadian ice hockey player
- Frederick Arthur (1816–1878), British soldier
- George Arthur (disambiguation), several people
- Gordon Arthur (footballer) (born 1958), Scottish footballer
- Gordon Arthur (bishop) (1909–1992), Anglican bishop in Australia
- Graham Arthur (1936–2021), Australian football player
- Harold J. Arthur (1904–1971), American politician
- Indus Arthur (1941–1984), American actor
- Isaac Arthur (born c. 1980), American YouTuber and futurist
- James Arthur (disambiguation), several people
- Jane Arthur (1827–1907), Scottish feminist, philanthropist and activist
- Jane Arthur (1981), New Zealand writer and poet
- Jean Arthur (1900–1991), American actor
- John Arthur (disambiguation), several people
- Johnny Arthur (1883–1951), American actor
- Joseph Arthur (born 1971), American singer-songwriter
- Joseph Charles Arthur (1850–1942), American plant pathologist and mycologist
- Julia Arthur (1869–1950), Canadian actor
- Kay Arthur (1933–2025), American Christian author, and Bible teacher
- Kenny Arthur (born 1978), Scottish football player
- Lyndon Arthur (born 1991), British boxer
- Maureen Arthur (1934–2022), American actor
- Max Arthur (1939–2019), British military historian
- Michael Arthur (disambiguation), several people
- Olivia Arthur (born 1980), British documentary photographer
- Oswald Raynor Arthur (1905–1973), British colonial administrator
- Owen Arthur (1949–2020), Barbadian politician
- Portia Arthur (born 1990), Ghanaian writer
- Rebeca Arthur (born 1960), American actor, known for her role in TV series Perfect Strangers
- Revington Arthur (1908–1986), American painter and educator
- Richard Arthur (Australian politician) (1865–1932), British-born physician and politician in Australia
- Richard Arthur (British politician), leader of Camden London Borough Council 1993–2000
- Richard Arthur (bishop) (c. 1560–1646), Irish theological figure
- Robert Arthur (disambiguation), several people
- Stan Arthur (born 1936), American admiral
- Sylvia Arthur (living), Ghanaian-heritage writer, founder of the Library Of Africa and the African Diaspora
- Thomas Arthur (disambiguation), several people
- Timothy Shay Arthur (1809–1885), American author
- Tom Arthur (rugby union) (1906–1986), Welsh rugby player
- Toni Arthur (born 1940), British folk singer, theatre director and broadcaster
- W. Brian Arthur (born 1945), British economist
- Wilfred Arthur (1919–2000), Australian fighter ace
- William Arthur (disambiguation), several people
- Zackary Arthur (born 2006), American actor

== See also ==
- Arthur
- Arthur baronets
- MacArthur (surname)
