= Richard Arthur =

Richard Arthur may refer to:

- Richard Arthur (bishop) (1560–1646), Irish religious figure
- Richard Arthur (Australian politician) (1865–1932), Australian politician
- Richard Arthur (British politician) (born 1944), British politician

== See also ==
- Arthur (surname)
