= General Arthur =

General Arthur may refer to:

- Chester A. Arthur (1829–1886), briefly a New York State Militia brigadier general, and later President of the United States
- Sir George Arthur, 1st Baronet (1784–1854), British Army major-general
- Sir Norman Arthur (born 1931), British Army lieutenant-general
- Thomas Arthur, comte de Lally (1702–1766), French general
- William Hemple Arthur (1856–1936), U.S. Army brigadier general in World War I
- General Arthur (horse), a thoroughbred horse trained by James W. Smith

== See also ==
- General MacArthur (disambiguation)
