= George Arthur (disambiguation) =

Sir George Arthur, 1st Baronet (1784–1854) was a colonial governor.

George Arthur may also refer to:

- George K. Arthur (1899–1985), Scottish-American film producer and actor
- George Kofi Arthur (born 1969), Ghanaian politician
- George Arthur (Australian soccer) (1925–1990), Australian football (soccer) player
- George Arthur (Ghanaian footballer) (1968–2015), Ghanaian football (soccer) player and coach
- George Arthur (cricketer) (1849–1932), Australian cricketer
- George Arthur, a fictional character in Tom Brown's School Days, a novel by Thomas Hughes
- Sir George Arthur, 3rd Baronet (1860–1946) of the Arthur baronets
- Sir George Arthur, 4th Baronet (1908–1949) of the Arthur baronets
