= John Arthur =

John Arthur may refer to:

- John Arthur (cricketer) (1847–1877), cricketer for Tasmania
- John Arthur (rugby union) (1848–1921), Scottish rugby football player
- John Arthur (Australian politician) (1875–1914), Australian Minister for External Affairs
- John Arthur (missionary) (1881–1952), medical missionary and Church of Scotland minister
- Johnny Arthur (1883–1951), American stage and motion picture actor
- John Arthur (Ghanaian politician) (1915–?), Ghanaian politician
- Jackie Arthur (1917-1986), English footballer
- John Arthur (philosopher) (1946–2007), American ethicist and philosophy professor
- John Arthur (boxer) (1929–2005), South African boxer
- John R. Arthur Jr., American materials scientist
- John Dada Arthur (born 1994), Ghanaian footballer
- John Arthur (Utah politician) (fl. 2020s), American teacher and politician

== See also ==
- Jon Arthur (1918–1982), host of the Saturday morning children's radio series Big Jon and Sparkie
- Jon Arthur (radio host) (fl. 2000s–2020s), American radio host
- Arthur John (disambiguation)
