= David Brewer (broker) =

English broker and politician (1940–2023)

Sir David William Brewer KG CMG CVO (28 May 1940 – 28 May 2023) was a British marine insurance broker who served as Lord Mayor of London (2005/06) and Lord-Lieutenant of Greater London to Elizabeth II (2008–15).

== Early life ==
Born in 1940, Brewer grew up in Hampstead and was educated at Winchester College and St Paul's School, London. He later studied at the University of Grenoble in France.

== Career ==
=== Business ===
Brewer began his 50-year career with marine insurance company Sedgwick Collins in 1959. In 1976 he went to Tokyo to open the Sedgwick Group's Japan office and lived there for three years. He set up its group office in China in 1981, obtaining the first broker's authorisation in 1993. He also opened the company's representative office in Bombay in 1986. He was non-executive vice-chairman of Marsh Ltd., the company which bought Sedgwick, from 2007 to 2009 and a director or consultant for various insurance companies. He was Chairman of the China-Britain Business Council until 2013 and held non-executive directorships of LIFFE Administration and Management (2009–2023), Tullett Prebon SITICO (China) (2006–2023) and the National Bank of Kuwait (International) (2007–2023).

=== Public service ===
Brewer was appointed a magistrate (JP) in 1979. Prior to serving as Alderman for the Ward of Bassishaw 1996–2010, he was a Common Councilman in the City of London; and was Aldermanic Sheriff of the City for 2002/3. His term of office as 678th Lord Mayor of London was 2005/06, and from 2008 to 2015 he served as HM's Representative for Greater London as lord-lieutenant.

== Public life ==
Brewer was a Past Master of the Worshipful Company of Merchant Taylors and of the Blacksmiths' Company, as well as being a Liveryman of the Worshipful Company of Insurers; President of the London-Cornish Association since 2005, Sir David was also Chairman of the Central Council of the Royal Over-Seas League from 2017 until his death.

== Personal life ==
In 1985, Brewer married Tessa Jordá, daughter of Enrique Jordá; they had two daughters (Olivia and Gabriella). A former President of the Chartered Institute of Linguists, Lady Brewer was appointed OBE in the Queen's Birthday Honours List for her work as Chairwoman of the City of London Festival.

A member of Marylebone Cricket Club, Sir David listed his recreations as music, golf and chocolate, as well as paronomasia (punning)!

Sir David and Lady Brewer divided their time between homes at Hellandbridge, near Bodmin, Cornwall and in London.

Brewer died on 28 May 2023, his 83rd birthday.

== Honours ==
Brewer was appointed a Companion of the Order of St Michael and St George (CMG) in the 1999 Birthday Honours for "services to Export" and a Knight of the Order of St John (KStJ) in 2005. He was knighted in the 2007 New Year Honours for "services to the City of London" and awarded the same year the Gold Rays with Neck Ribbon of the Japanese Order of the Rising Sun. In the 2015 New Year Honours he was appointed a Commander of the Royal Victorian Order (CVO) for his "services as Lord-Lieutenant of Greater London" and then, on 23 April 2016, a Knight Companion of the Order of the Garter (KG).

Sir David received honorary doctorates from a number of universities, i.e. in 2008 from respectively the City University London (Hon. LLD), SOAS University of London (Hon. DSc) and the University of Exeter (Hon. LLD), and in 2013 from the University of Nottingham (Hon. LLD).

Arms of Sir David Brewer KG: Gules, three Heads of Dragon Argent, horned Or, between two Flaunches with rays Or, within the Garter circlet. Crest: A Bactrian Camel couchant Or.

Knight Companion of the Order of the Garter (KG)	2016
Knight Bachelor	2007
Companion of the Order of St Michael and St George (CMG)	1999
Commander of the Royal Victorian Order (CVO)	2015
Knight of the Order of St John (KStJ)	2005
Gold Rays with Neck Ribbon of the Order of the Rising Sun	(Japan) 2007

== Styles ==
- David Brewer (1940–1979)
- David Brewer JP (1979–1999)
- David Brewer CMG JP (1999–2007)
  - The Right Hon Lord Mayor of London (2005/06)
- Sir David Brewer CMG JP (2007–2015)
- Sir David Brewer CMG CVO JP (2015–2016)
- Sir David Brewer KG CMG CVO JP (2016–2023).

== Sources ==
- Seib, Christine. "Business big shot: Sir David Brewer" The Times (London). 3 February 2007.

Civic offices
Preceded by Sir Michael Savory	Lord Mayor of London; 2005–2006	Succeeded by Sir John Stuttard
Honorary titles
Preceded by The Lord Imbert	Lord-Lieutenant of Greater London; 2008–2015	Succeeded by Sir Ken Olisa
