= Gavyn Arthur =

British judge

His Honour Sir Gavyn Arthur KStJ
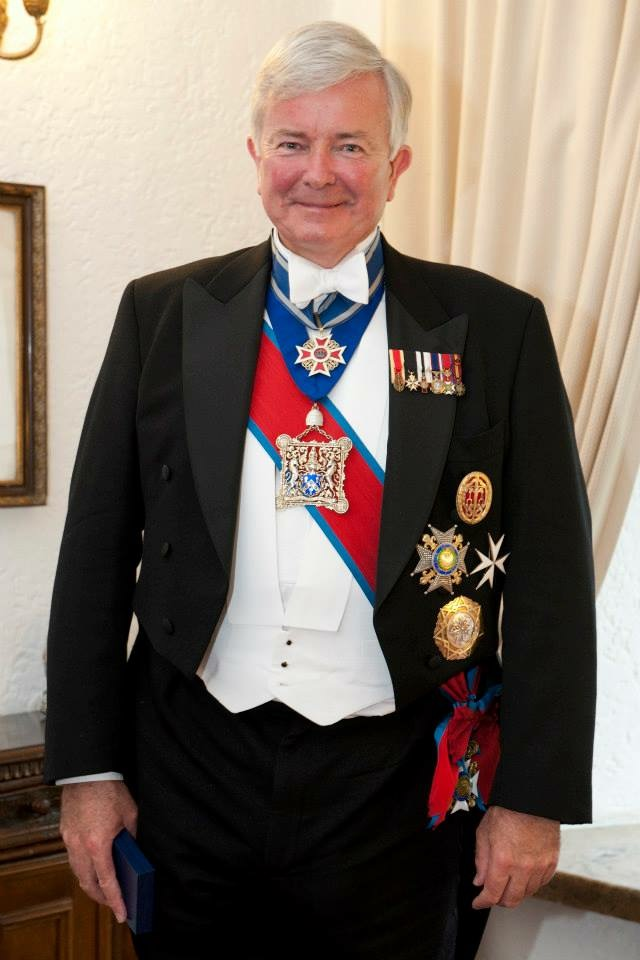
- Sir Gavyn Arthur as Master Wax Chandler

675th Lord Mayor of London
- In office 2002–2003
- Preceded by: Sir Michael Oliver
- Succeeded by: Sir Robert Finch

Personal details
- Born: 13 September 1951 Union of South Africa
- Died: 16 May 2016 (aged 64) London, England
- Relations: Sir Benjamin Arthur, Bt
- Education: Christ Church, Oxford
- Occupation: Lawyer
- Profession: Judge

Sir Gavyn Farr Arthur (13 September 1951 – 16 May 2016) was a British judge and prominent figure in the City of London who served as the 675th Lord Mayor from 2002 to 2003.

== Early life ==
The only surviving son of Major (South African Army) Leonard Arthur JP by his wife Raina née Farr, he was educated at Harrow School before going up to Christ Church, Oxford.

His father was in remainder to the baronetcy of his great-great-grandfather, Lt-Gen. Sir George Arthur, and from 2010 until his death Sir Gavyn was heir presumptive to the Arthur family title.

== Career ==
Arthur was called to the bar in 1975 at the Middle Temple, before being appointed a Bencher in 2001.

He practised as a barrister and was appointed a Recorder in 2001 and a Circuit Judge in 2007 before promotion as a Deputy High Court Judge in 2008.

He served as Alderman for the Ward of Cripplegate in the City from his election in 1991 until 2005. Sir Gavyn served as Sheriff for 1998–99 and as Lord Mayor of London (2002–2003), when he was ex-officio Chancellor of City University London; he received an honorary Doctorate of Laws from City University London. He was a Past Master of the Worshipful Company of Gardeners, the Worshipful Company of Wax Chandlers, the Guild of Public Relations Practitioners, and the Guild of Freemen of the City of London.

Sir Gavyn died suddenly in May 2016.

== Honours ==
Sir Gavyn Arthur was honoured by several countries. In the United Kingdom, he was appointed by the Queen a Knight Bachelor in the 2004 New Year Honours in recognition of his services to the City of London, and a Knight of Justice (2003) in the Venerable Order of St John.

In 2003, he was awarded by the President of Georgia with the Order of Honour of the Republic of Georgia. He was invested as a Knight Commander of the Royal Order of Francis I in 2006 and was promoted in 2011 to the rank of Knight Grand Cross by decree of Prince Carlo, Duke of Castro. In 2013 he was appointed Knight Commander of the Royal Order of the Crown by King Michael I of Romania and in 2016 received the Medal of the President of the Slovak Republic for his services to British-Slovak relations.

Civic offices
Preceded by Sir Michael Oliver	Lord Mayor of London; 2002–2003	Succeeded by Sir Robert Finch
