= Arthur Johns =

Arthur Johns may refer to:

- Arthur Johns (sound engineer) (1889–1947), American sound engineer
- Arthur Johns (naval architect) (1873–1937), British naval architect

== See also ==
- Arthur John (disambiguation)
