= Robert Finch (Lord Mayor) =

British businessman, lawyer and Lord Mayor of London

Sir Robert Finch
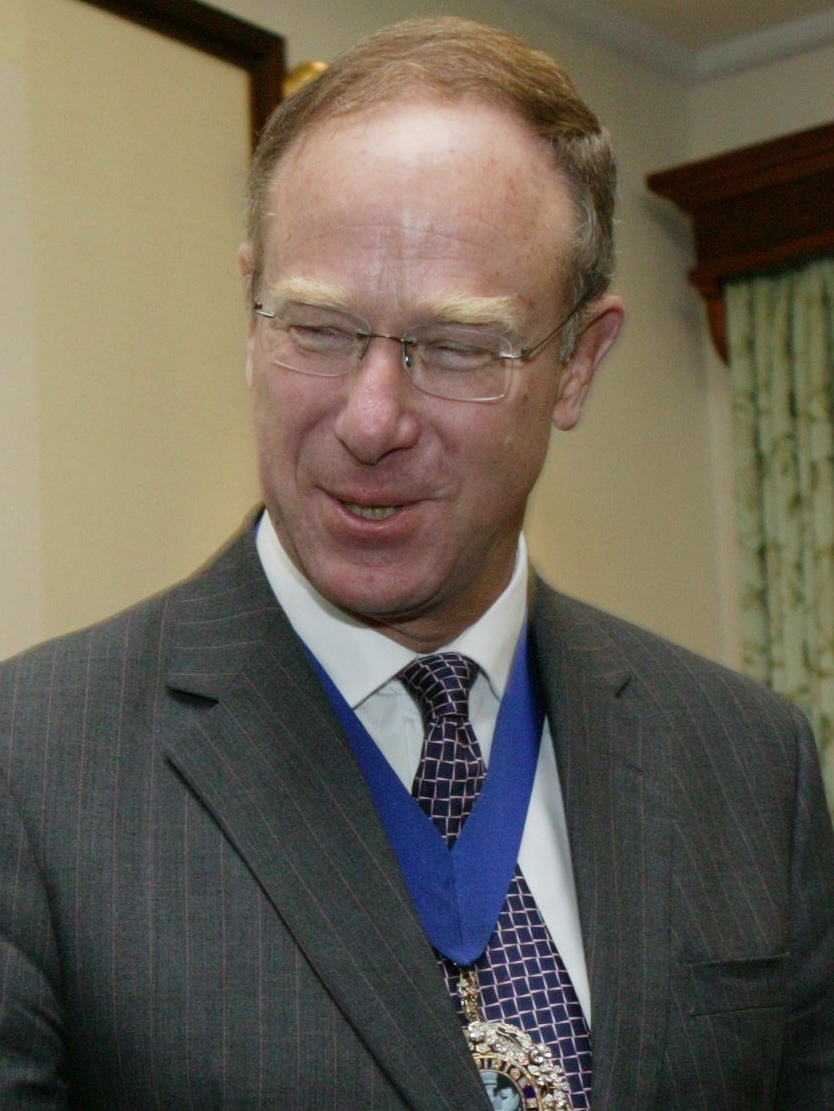
- Finch in 2004

676th Lord Mayor of London
- In office 2003–2004
- Preceded by: Sir Gavyn Arthur
- Succeeded by: Sir David Lewis

Personal details
- Born: 20 August 1944 Ootacamund, British India
- Died: 31 March 2016 (aged 71) West Sussex, England
- Education: Michael Savory
- Alma mater: The College of Law

Sir Robert Gerard Finch (20 August 1944 – 31 March 2016) was a British businessman, lawyer, and Lord Mayor of London from 23 July 2003 to 22 July 2004.

Born in British India, Finch was educated at Felsted School and the College of Law. He joined Linklaters in 1969, progressed to Partner in 1974, and Head of Real Estate from 1997 to 1999. Linklaters' most Senior Partner, he left the firm on 1 July 2005 to become Chairman of property developer Liberty International, overseeing its transition to a REIT when the status was first introduced.

He was Alderman for the City Ward of Coleman Street, having first been elected to represent Coleman Street in 1992. He became a Sheriff in 1999, Master of the Solicitors' Company in 2000, and Lord Mayor of London in 2003.

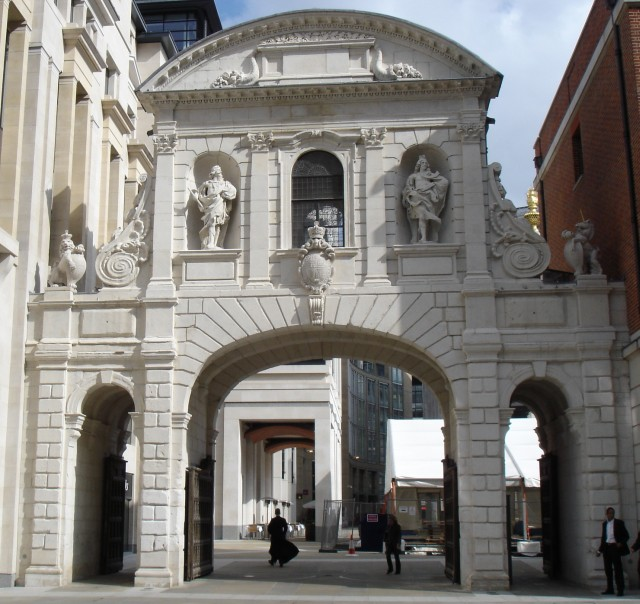
Wren's Temple Bar new location in Paternoster Square was declared open by Lord Mayor Finch in 2004.

In 2008, following a change to the voting system to the Court of Aldermen, he was successfully challenged by a previously unheard-of young lawyer, Matthew Richardson (now Alderman), in a close-fought campaign. Finch admitted to having overspent on the campaign, by not declaring the use of Liberty's company car and chauffeur. When challenged, in Finch and another v Richardson (2008), a judge ruled that ignorance of the law could constitute by virtue of inadvertence a defence in electoral law: a point that hitherto existed in Scots law and Northern Ireland law, but not in English law.

Finch was appointed Knight Bachelor in 2004 for "services to the City of London".

He died on 31 March 2016 at the age of 71 after a short illness.

== Footnotes ==
Civic offices
| Preceded by Sir Gavyn Arthur | Lord Mayor of London; 2003–2004 | Succeeded by Sir Michael Savory |
