= John Stuttard =

British politician (born 1945)

Sir John Stuttard KStJ JP FCA
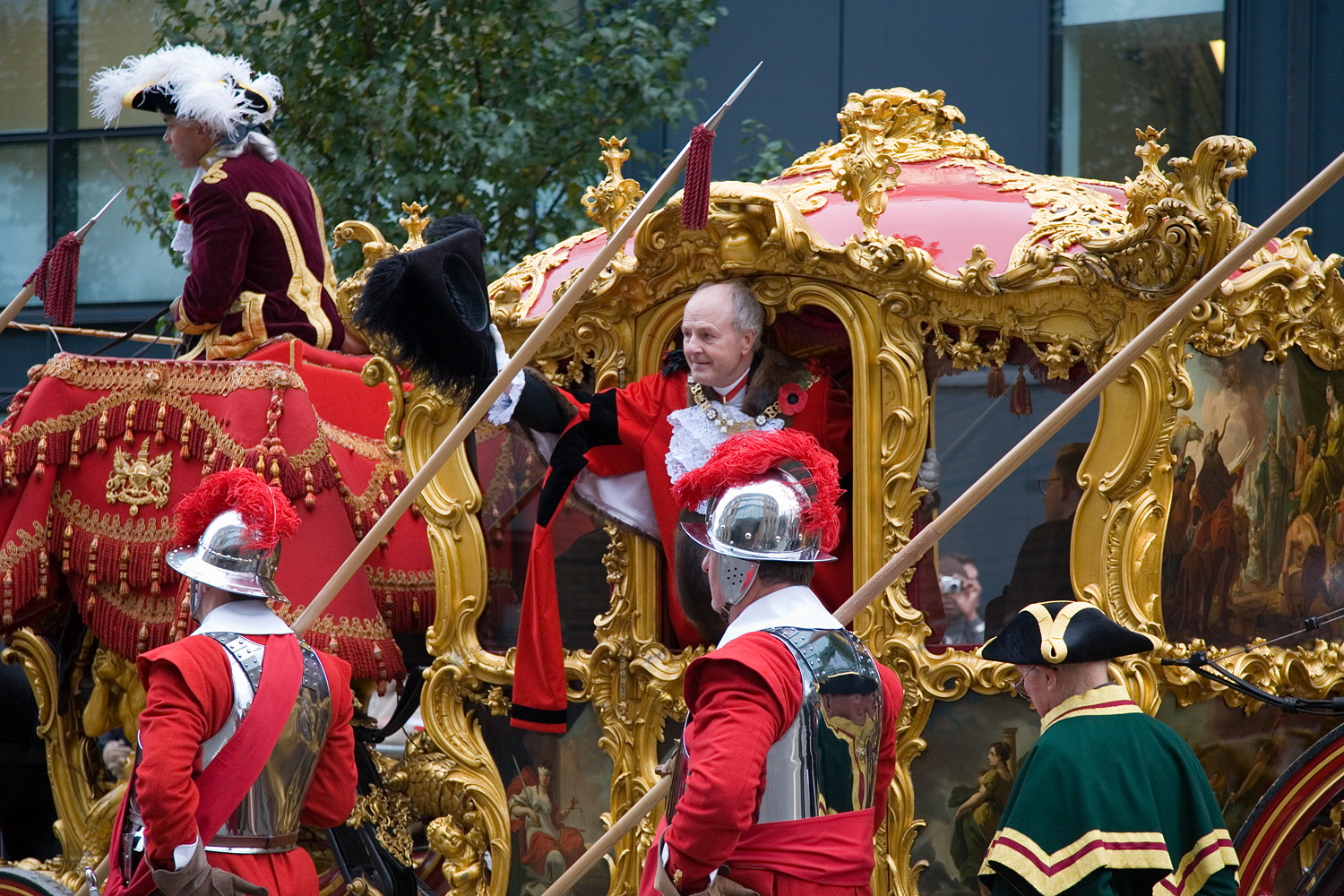
- Stuttard (waving from Lord Mayor's Coach) during the 2006 Lord Mayor's Show

679th Lord Mayor of London
- In office 2006–2007
- Preceded by: Sir David Brewer
- Succeeded by: Sir David Lewis

Personal details
- Spouse: Lesley
- Education: Shrewsbury School
- Alma mater: Churchill College, Cambridge

Sir John Boothman Stuttard KStJ JP FCA (born 6 February 1945) is an English chartered accountant who was Lord Mayor of the City of London from 2006 to 2007.

== Early life ==
Stuttard was born in Burnley, Lancashire, and educated at Shrewsbury School before going up to Churchill College, Cambridge (MA).

== Career ==
Stuttard joined Cooper Brothers in 1967, qualifying as a chartered accountant in 1970 and becoming a Fellow of the Institute of Chartered Accountants in England & Wales. He was a Partner in PricewaterhouseCoopers from 1975 to 2005 and has been an adviser to the firm since then (including being deputy chairman of the advisory board). From 1981, he spent two years on secondment to HM Cabinet Office advising the Central Policy Review Staff on nationalized industries and their privatisation. From 1983 to 1994 he was the chairman of the firm's Scandinavian group. He spent five years in China from 1994 to 1999 as PWC executive chairman.

In 2005 he was elected as Aldermanic Sheriff and in 2006 as Lord Mayor of London.

Sir John's charitable, business activities and public appointments have included:

- Voluntary Service Overseas, Teacher with at SOAS College, Brunei (1966–1967);
- New Horizon Youth Centre in London's West End, Honorary Treasurer (1972–1977);
- Cambridge University Appointments Board, board member, advising the Cambridge University Careers Service (1977–1981);
- Totteridge Manor Association, an environmental charity, Director (1980–2005), Treasurer (1980–1994) and Chairman (2002–2005);
- China-Britain Business Council Director (2000–2006);
- VSO Member, Fund Raising Advisory Board (2000–2005), Council Member (2006–2011), Honorary Vice-president (2011–);
- Advisory Committee of the East Asia Institute of the Faculty of Oriental Studies at Cambridge University Member (2001–);
- Finnish-British Chamber of Commerce, Director (2001–2006), Chairman (2002–2006), and Life President (2007–);
- Justice of the Peace (2001–);
- City of London: Alderman for Lime Street (2001–2013), Sheriff (2005–2006), Lord Mayor (2006–2007);
- Bridewell Royal Hospital Court Member and Fellow (2002–2013);
- King Edward's School, Witley Governor (2002–2013);
- Guild of Educators, "Sponsoring Alderman" (2002–2013);
- The Mayor of London's Disaster Relief Appeal, Trustee (2002–2013);
- Charities Aid Foundation, Trustee (2003–2006 and 2007–2008) and chairman, Audit, Risk and Compliance Committee (2003–2006);
- City of London Archaeological Trust, Trustee (2003–2011);
- St Paul's Cathedral Foundation - Advisor (2005–2011), Trustee and Chairman (2011–2013);
- Morden College, Greenwich, an old-people's home, Trustee (2005–2020);
- Totteridge Residents Association, vice-president (2006–2013);
- The Lord Mayor's 800th Anniversary Appeal "to help young people travel", Trustee (2005–2013);
- Admiral of the Port of London (2006–2007);
- City University Chancellor (2006–2007);
- HM Lieutenancy of London (2006–2013);
- London and Greater London Merchant Navy Association, President (2007–)
- He is an Honorary Fellow of the Foreign Policy Association, New York (2000), Honorary Doctor of Letters, City University (2006), an Honorary Fellow, Securities & Investment Institute (2007), and an Honorary Member of the Association of Chartered Certified Accountants (2008);
- Livery companies: Worshipful Company of Glaziers and Painters of Glass - Master (2009); the Worshipful Company of Chartered Accountants in England and Wales - Master (2011); the Worshipful Company of Educators - Master (2013), and the Worshipful Company of Plumbers.
- Kazakh-British Trade & Industry Council, Co-chair (2009–2013)
- Churchill College, Cambridge - By-Fellow of the Moller Centre (2008–2014), Patron of the Churchill Archives Centre (2015–)
- Shaftesbury Civic Society, Hon President (2013–2021)
- Shaftesbury & District Historical Society, Hon President (2019–)
- Author of fourteen books The New Silk Road – Secrets of Business Success in China Today published by John Wiley (2000) and Whittington to World Financial Centre - The City of London and its Lord Mayor by Phillimore & Co (2008), Travels in a Lifetime by John Stuttard (2015), A History of British McCalls by John Stuttard (2016), editor of The Worshipful Company of Chartered Accountants in England and Wales: The First Forty Years by WCCAEW (2017) and 'The Turbulent Quaker of Shaftesbury' by Hobnob Press (2018), The 20-Ghost Club: The Oldest Rolls-Royce Club in the World, 1949-2019 (2019), By Rolls-Royce Silver Ghost to the Isle of Skye in 1920 (2021), Pre-War Rolls-Royce Motor Cars with a Finnish connection (2021), Russia and Rolls-Royce – The First 25 Years (2021), The City of London Sheriffs’ Society (2023), Rolls-Royce in East Africa (2025), Rolls-Royce in Ceylon (2026), Rolls-Royce in Egypt (2027)

== Honours and awards ==
- He was appointed a Knight Bachelor in the 2008 New Year Honours;
- He was appointed a Knight of Justice of the Order of St John (2006) and a Companion of the League of Mercy Foundation (2007);
- He was awarded Commander of the Order of the Lion of Finland by the Government of Finland (2004), and is a recipient of the Silver Medal of Helsinki;
- He received the Coronation Medal from the Sultan of Selangor (2001);
- He received the 20th Anniversary Jubilee Medal from the President of Kazakhstan (2011);
- He was awarded the Ivan Everden Award by the Rolls-Royce Enthusiasts Club for the best published work of the year (2025)

Civic offices
Preceded by Sir David Brewer	Lord Mayor of London; 2006–2007	Succeeded by Sir David Lewis
