= Nick Anstee =

British politician

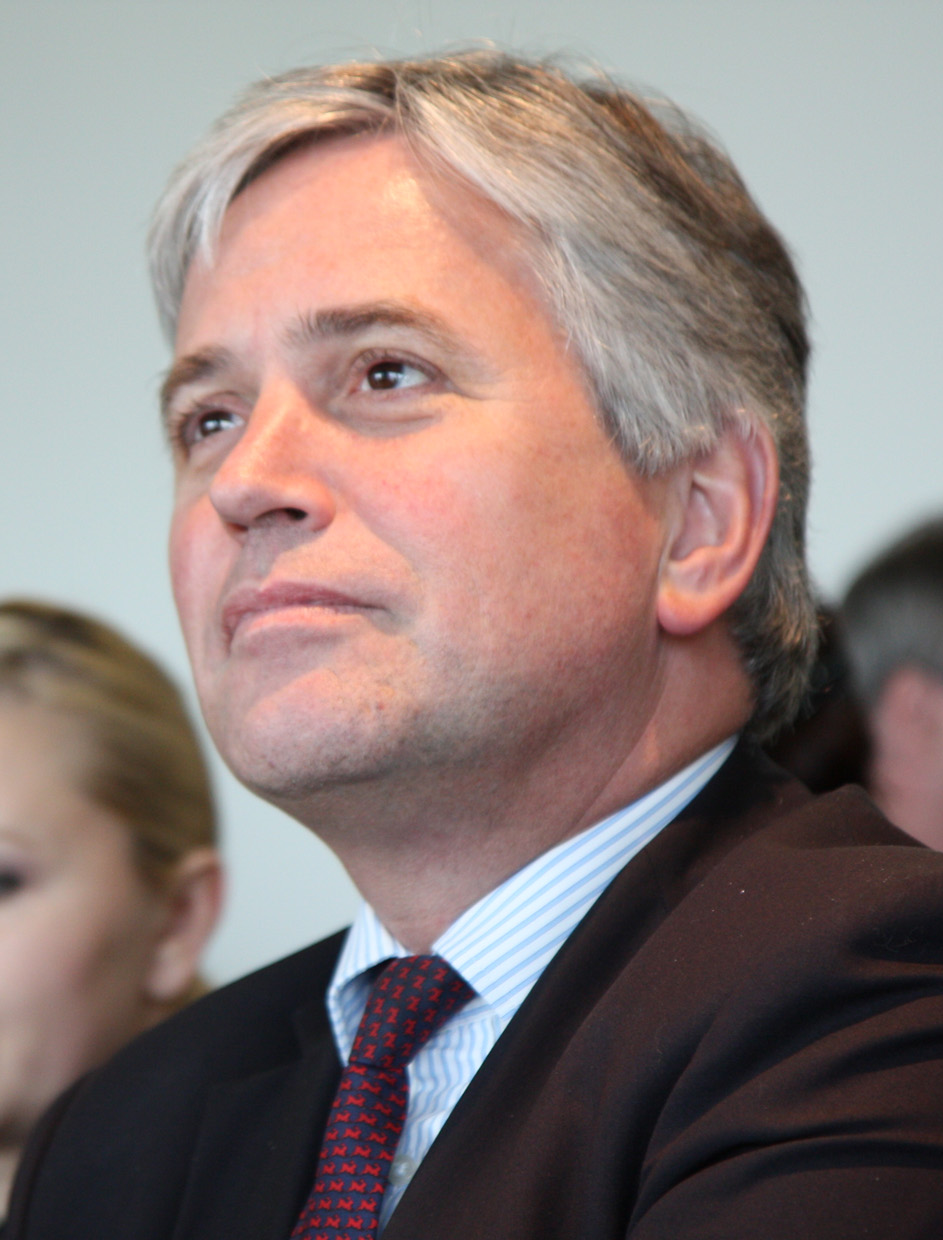

682nd Lord Mayor of London
- In office 13 November 2009 – 12 November 2010
- Preceded by: Ian Luder CBE
- Succeeded by: Sir Michael Bear

Personal details
- Born: 27 May 1958 (age 68) Moreton-in-Marsh, Gloucs
- Party: non-affiliated
- Spouse: Claire née Cooper
- Children: 3 daus: Becca, Megan & Jen
- Education: INSEAD
- Profession: Chartered accountant (FCA)

Nicholas John Anstee (born 27 May 1958, Gloucestershire) is the former Lord Mayor of the City of London; he was the 682nd person to serve as mayor and his term was from 2009 to 2010. He served as Alderman for the Ward of Aldersgate having previously been its representative in the City since his election as a Common Councilman in 1987.

== Early life ==
Alderman Anstee was born in Moreton-in-Marsh, Gloucestershire, he is the son of Wing Commander Peter Anstee by his wife Ann Price. He attended Stamford School in Lincolnshire, before attending INSEAD at Fontainebleau and then Staffordshire University.

== Career ==
Having qualified as a chartered accountant in 1982, Anstee worked for a number of clearing banks before becoming a partner in Arthur Andersen. He then moved to Deloitte and Touche. Anstee is now a senior director of the international law firm SJ Berwin.

Sheriff of the City of London 2003–04, he became Lord Mayor of London for 2009–10, when Alderman Anstee was also the ex-officio Chancellor of City University London.

In 2010, he received a Doctor of Science honoris causa from City University London. Uniquely in modern times, he refused any national honour upon his retirement as Lord Mayor. He was offered appointment as a CBE, but reportedly turned it down.

== Personal life ==
Anstee married Claire Cooper in 1983. They have three daughters (born March 1985, July 1987 and January 1993), who attended the City of London School for Girls.

Civic offices
Preceded by Ian Luder	Lord Mayor of London; 2009–2010	Succeeded by Sir Michael Bear
