= UK Advisory Committee on Degree Awarding Powers =

The UK Advisory Committee on Degree Awarding Powers (ACDAP), is a committee within the Quality Assurance Agency for Higher Education. It is responsible for considering applications for degree awarding powers and university title (DAP/UT), and providing confidential advice via the Board to the Privy Council. All applications for new universities must be approved by the Committee.

== Purpose ==
ACDAP is responsible for considering applications for degree awarding powers and university title (DAP/UT). No organisation may award degrees or call itself a university in the UK unless authorised to do so by the government via the committee. There are three levels of DAP - Foundation, Teaching, and Research DAPs. It also oversees the criteria and scrutiny processes used to assess applications.

== Membership ==
The Committee's membership comprises the independent Chair, two Board members, seven members with current or recent UK DAP experience, two members with experience within a professional body, one member with a background in College Higher Education and one student member. Two more members may added to the Committee to bring other relevant expertise.

ACDAP
Chair	Andrew Ramsay	Former Chief Executive Officer, Engineering Council
	Professor Phil Cardew	Deputy Vice-Chancellor (Academic), Leeds Beckett University
	Professor Aldwyn Cooper	Vice-Chancellor and Chief Executive, Regent's University, London
	Dr Vanessa Davies	Director General of the Bar Standards Board
	Charles Hunt	Vice-Chancellor, University College of Osteopathy
	Anne Lambert	Board Member, Competition and Markets Authority
	Professor Jane Longmore	Vice-Chancellor, University of Chichester
	Professor Lorna Milne	Senior Vice-Principal (Proctor), University of St Andrews
	Aaron Lowman	Academic Registrar, The Academy of Live and Recorded Arts
	Dorothea Ross-Simpson	Head of Academic Quality and Student Conduct, Keele University
	Professor Alan Speight	Pro-Vice-Chancellor (Education), University of Hull
	Jenny Taylor	IBM UK Foundation Leader, IBM (UK)
	Philip Wilson	
	Dr Steve Wright	Director of Higher Education, Nelson and Colne College
