= Access to Higher Education =

British educational qualification

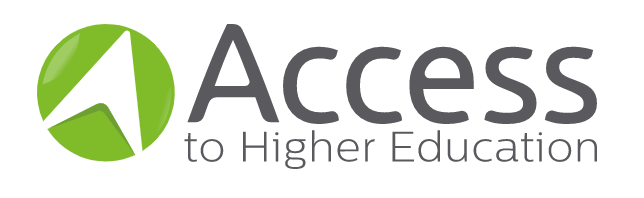
Access to Higher Education Diploma logo

The Access to Higher Education (HE) Diploma is a UK qualification which prepares adult learners for study as an undergraduate at university. The Diploma is designed for people who would like to study in higher education but who left school without attaining a Level 3 qualification, such as A-Levels. Once completed, the access Diploma is held in the same standing as 3 A-Levels, allowing holders to study for BA degrees, BSc degrees, HNCs, HNDs, LLBs and other undergraduate degrees including degree apprenticeships.

A national framework has been in existence since 1989. The Quality Assurance Agency (QAA), the Access to HE regulatory body, has been responsible for this framework in England, Wales and Northern Ireland since it was established in 1997. QAA works by licensing Access Validating Agencies to approve colleges and other providers to deliver Diplomas and make awards.

The first Access courses were established in the 1970s. Many of these courses were set up to encourage entry to teacher training by people with a wider range of backgrounds than the traditional types of students who were attracted to teaching. Over the years, the success of these early courses led to the development of courses in other areas. In the 1987 white paper Higher Education: Meeting the Challenge, the government identified Access to HE as 'the third recognised route to higher education', and sought to extend Access to HE provision through a national framework for the recognition of Access to HE courses. In 2017 Access to HE was added to the UCAS tariff.

Each year, around 20,000 Access to HE students apply to universities across the UK. There are over 1,200 different courses leading to the Access to HE Diploma and courses are available in most further education colleges in England and Wales, and also via private providers. Access to HE courses are generally tailored as pathways; that is, they prepare students with the necessary skills and imbue the appropriate knowledge required for a specific undergraduate career. For example, there are Access to HE (Law), Access to HE (Medicine) and Access to HE (Medicine) pathways that prepare students to study law, medicine and nursing at undergraduate level, respectively.

Access to HE differs to Foundation programmes in that the Diploma leads to a stand-alone qualification.
