= Quality Assurance Agency for Higher Education =

British non-profit organization

- Abbreviation: QAA
- Formation: 1997
- Legal status: Non-profit organisation
- Location: Southgate House, Southgate Street, Gloucester
- Region served: UK
- Chief Executive: Professor Karl Leydecker (interim)
- Main organ: QAA Board
- Website: qaa.ac.uk

The Quality Assurance Agency for Higher Education (usually referred to simply as the Quality Assurance Agency or QAA) is the independent expert quality body for the United Kingdom's higher education sector. Its mandate is to maintain and enhance the quality of teaching and learning in tertiary education within the United Kingdom and internationally. The QAA conducts quality assessment reviews, develops reference points and guidance for providers, and undertakes or commissions research on relevant issues.

The QAA plays a nationwide role in the United Kingdom on behalf of the sector, maintaining sector-owned reference points such as the United Kingdom Quality Code for Higher Education and Subject Benchmark Statements. It also maintains the Credit Frameworks used across the various nations of the United Kingdom and the Framework for Higher Education Qualifications, which is applicable throughout the United Kingdom, except in Scotland.

QAA provides guidance and other publications, and runs events, relating to the maintenance of standards and the enhancement of quality of teaching and learning. In Scotland, Wales and Northern Ireland these enhancement activities are part of the formal quality arrangements; in England they are provided through a separate membership scheme, through which the sector in England also contributes to the funding of the sector-owned reference points.

QAA undertakes cyclical quality review of higher education institutions throughout the United Kingdom, except currently in England, where the regulator, the Office for Students (OfS), has not implemented a cyclical review approach and QAA has chosen to focus on its enhancement activity, including new paid-for services to help the sector meet regulatory requirements and enhance quality.

In addition to its role in sustaining the reputation of United Kingdom higher education, QAA also regulates the Access to Higher Education Diploma, a qualification that enables individuals without A Levels or the usual equivalent to enter higher education.

QAA works closely with other organisations that have an interest in the reputation of United Kingdom higher education, including the Scottish Funding Council, Medr, Department for the Economy in Northern Ireland, Universities United Kingdom and GuildHE.

== Purpose and focus areas ==
QAA's purpose is 'to ensure that students and learners experience the highest possible quality of education.' Its strategy sets out the scope of its work in terms of four focus areas: Standards (QAA is custodian of various sector reference points); Assurance and enhancement; International; Leadership (QAA advises governments and has a high public profile on matters of quality).

== Status and funding ==
QAA is an independent body, a company limited by guarantee, and a registered charity in England, Wales and Scotland. Its objects and constitution are set out in its Articles of Association. Its board includes representatives of United Kingdom universities and other higher education institutions, further education colleges, funding councils, and students.

QAA's funding comes from a combination of membership subscriptions from universities and colleges in the United Kingdom and internationally, contracts with United Kingdom higher education regulators, funding bodies and government departments, and commissioned work including international reviews and business development work.

It operates a flexible working policy but continues to maintain offices in Gloucester.

== Role and responsibilities ==
=== Higher education review work ===
United Kingdom degree-awarding bodies (mainly universities) set their own standards for the degrees and other qualifications they award (academic degrees), but since most courses are partly or entirely publicly funded (including through student loans) there is a requirement that they undergo external review to demonstrate that a national 'threshold' standard is met, and that quality is satisfactory. QAA is the body that undertakes this independent role in the United Kingdom. It does so through processes of peer review. Reviewers have extensive experience of higher education at a senior level, or are current or recent students.

While there are some differences between the methods used by QAA to achieve this, they have some key features in common. All reviews check that United Kingdom expectations are met; currently this is done by benchmarking the provision against QAA's Quality Code (see below). Other resources used for benchmarks of academic standards include the 'subject benchmark statements' (maintained by QAA in consultation with the academic community), relevant qualifications and credit frameworks, institutions' own rules and handbooks, standards set by professional bodies, and the European Standards and Guidelines maintained by the European Association for Quality Assurance in Higher Education (ENQA).

Each review results in a published report containing judgements on whether United Kingdom expectations are met. Separate judgements comment on academic standards, academic quality, and the public information provided about courses. Reports include recommendations for improvement, citations of good practice, and affirmations of actions taken by the higher education provider to improve since the last review.

QAA's review methods are informed by a self-evaluation submitted in advance by each university or college, and by a 'student submission' - a commentary by its students. At time of writing, review places an emphasis on the existence of robust academic management structures, and policies and approaches that enable national expectations to be fulfilled, combined with evidence that this is happening. Evidence is obtained in a variety of ways, including interviews with relevant individuals and structured discussions with student and staff focus groups.

QAA reviews do not generally look at individual courses or programmes of study, neither do they review or evaluate students' work.

=== Guidance on quality and standards ===
In cooperation with the United Kingdom higher education sector, QAA maintains the United Kingdom Quality Code for Higher Education (Quality Code - see below), the subject benchmark statements for bachelor's and master's degrees, and other guidance for helping higher education providers to meet agreed United Kingdom expectations. Where appropriate, QAA also works with professional, regulatory and statutory bodies, and employers, to ensure that its guidance is fit for purpose. Draft guidance is published on QAA's website (via a tab on the home page), where it is accessible for public consultation before being formally published.

==== The Quality Code ====
The Quality Code (full name: United Kingdom Quality Code for Higher Education) sets out four expectations for standards and quality that must be met by United Kingdom higher education providers that receive any kind of public or student loan funding. These expectations are underpinned by core practices, which are mandatory for all United Kingdom providers, and common practices, which are mandatory in Scotland, Wales and Northern Ireland.

The Quality Code replaced the 'Academic Infrastructure' (see below) in 2012 as the main reference point for checking on the quality of United Kingdom higher education, having been developed in close consultation with the United Kingdom higher education sector. In 2015 the Quality Code was extended to include the United Kingdom 'frameworks for higher education qualifications' (specifying levels for the different higher education qualifications and defining these through 'level descriptors') and the subject benchmark statements (specifying what outcomes - knowledge, understanding, skills and attributes - are expected of bachelor's and master's graduates in specific disciplines). The Code was revised in 2018 following the passing of the Higher Education and Research Act. Owned and maintained by QAA, it sets out 'fundamental principles that should apply to higher education quality across the United Kingdom'.

The Quality Code covers:

- setting and maintaining standards, as determined by the United Kingdom qualifications frameworks and subject benchmark statements, together with other relevant guidance
- meeting United Kingdom expectations about the quality of the student experience, and seeking ways to enhance this
- providing trustworthy and reliable information about courses.

In Scotland the levels are different, being part of the Scottish Credit and Qualifications Framework). Wales also has an integrated academic credit and qualifications framework, while England has a separate credit framework maintained by QAA.

Higher education providers use the Quality Code, in conjunction with their own internal policies and other guidance, to design the programmes of study that lead to their higher education awards (including academic degrees). QAA reviewers use it to check that expectations are met when they conduct a review.

==== Other guidance ====
QAA provides other guidance to supplement the Quality Code (but which unlike the Quality Code is advisory rather than mandatory). The Quality Code is supported by advice and guidance, divided into twelve Themes. The Higher Education Credit Framework for England (see previous note) enables providers to allocate a credit tariff to courses and modules. Other guidance documents help universities and colleges to address particular student needs, such as learning about sustainable practices or enterprise and entrepreneurship, or they inform the public and students about the higher education experience, for example the balance between self-directed and structured learning.

QAA conducts or sponsors research projects and consultation events relating to quality in United Kingdom higher education and publishes guidance on topical issues. It also publishes analysis of the collective findings of its reports to identify emergent trends.

=== Investigation of complaints and concerns ===
QAA investigates allegations of 'systemic failings' by higher education providers, whereas the Office of the Independent Adjudicator deals with individual complaints and grievances. Both systems are designed as a recourse for students who have already asked for an internal investigation into their complaint and have not found the outcome of this to be satisfactory.

Systemic failings are taken to mean a failure by a university or college in meeting its responsibilities for standards and quality. The concern needs to be supported by evidence. Where QAA deems a full investigation necessary it publishes its findings in a report.

=== Advisory role on degree awarding powers and university title ===
QAA advises the Privy Council of the United Kingdom, via government ministers, on the merits of applications for giving educational institutions degree-awarding powers or the right to be called a university. Applications are considered by the QAA's UK Advisory Committee on Degree Awarding Powers, enabling its board to offer advice to ministers.

=== Regulation of the Access to Higher Education Diploma ===
QAA is the regulator for the Access to Higher Education Diploma which enables adults without A-Levels or their equivalent to progress to higher education. Organisations known as Access Validating Agencies (AVAs) are responsible for validating and reviewing Access courses and awarding the Diploma to successful students. QAA licenses and monitors the AVAs and publishes information about its findings.

== International relations ==
QAA conducts reviews of locations where courses are provided by, or on behalf of, United Kingdom degree-awarding bodies. It is a member of ENQA, and of the International Network for Quality Assurance Agencies in Higher Education (INQAAHE), meeting the quality criteria of both organisations in full. In 2014 the agency was added to the European Quality Assurance Register (EQAR). Having signed memoranda of cooperation with a number of overseas quality assurance bodies, QAA has been endorsed by the Asia Pacific Quality Network (APQN) for promoting international cooperation in quality assurance.

== History ==
In 1996 the Joint Planning Group for Quality Assurance in Higher Education recommended that the then two streams of quality assurance in higher education - Subject Review and Academic Audit (which had been in use since 1991) - should be brought together under a single body. QAA was established In April 1997 through the transfer of functions and staff from the former Higher Education Quality Council and the quality assessment divisions of HEFCE and HEFCW.

=== The Dearing Report and its legacy ===
The Dearing Report published in 1997 "gave the QAA the remit of providing assurance about standards and quality", following which it developed a higher education qualifications framework, a code of practice and subject benchmark statements, and established a pool of external examiners.

This laid the foundations for the so-called Academic Infrastructure, which QAA developed between 1997 and 2001 (a set of United Kingdom benchmarks for quality and standards) and the development of a new, United Kingdom-wide process of Academic Review which comprised elements of both Subject Review and Academic Audit - with an emphasis on the latter. The new process was introduced in Scotland, but before it had become fully operational across the United Kingdom a number of English universities complained about the administrative burden that this approach entailed, leading to a rethink by the Westminster government. The Scottish and Welsh higher education authorities took this opportunity to set up their own national arrangements, while in England QAA worked with the bodies representing higher education institutions (Universities United Kingdom and Guild HE) to devise a modified approach known as Institutional Audit. QAA Scotland developed the procedure known as Enhancement-Led Institutional Review (ELIR), while in Wales the method known as Institutional Review was established. Northern Ireland followed England and adopted Institutional Audit. QAA remained the organisation charged with developing and undertaking these activities.

It was agreed that in England there would be a transitional period of three years (2002 to 2005) during which all higher education institutions would undergo their first Institutional Audit. Thereafter audits would take place on a six-yearly cycle. In the year prior to their audit, institutions underwent 'developmental engagements' - unpublished subject-based reviews to support internal quality assurance. There were also 'discipline audit trails' (DATs) - selective subject-based enquiries that enabled a phased reduction of the subject focus of QAA reviews. In 2005 a revised Institutional Audit model was developed and adopted with the agreement of the representative bodies and HEFCE. This removed the DATs, thereby freeing time in the audit process to explore a broader range of topics and themes. This model continued in use on a six-year cycle until 2011.

=== Criticism and reform ===
In 2008, Professor Geoffrey Alderman, former chairman of University of London's academic council, asserted there was a decline of academic standards in British higher education that resulted in grade inflation. At a parliamentary inquiry (17 July 2008), the then CEO of QAA, Peter Williams, told a select committee that there was no evidence of consistency in grades given between degree subjects and between institutions. A QAA report published prior to the inquiry said degree classifications were "arbitrary and unreliable". The Select Committee published a report (2 August 2009) which proposed policy changes to expand QAA remit to ensure the meeting of consistent standards. The report claimed QAA at the time focused mainly on evaluating processes not standards. According to the report:

"it is not acceptable, as we found during our inquiry, that Vice-Chancellors cannot give a straightforward answer to the simple question of whether students obtaining first class honours degrees at different universities had attained the same intellectual standards.

The body that currently "assures quality", the Quality Assurance Agency for Higher Education (QAA), focuses almost exclusively on processes, not standards. This needs to change. We call for the QAA to be transformed into an independent Quality and Standards Agency with a remit, statutory if necessary, to safeguard, monitor and report on standards."

In October 2009 a new Chief Executive was appointed (Anthony McClaran, formerly of UCAS), and measures were put in place to strengthen QAA's reputation. These included an agenda to increase student participation and public engagement.

=== The Browne Report and policy change ===
The Browne Report (October 2010) commissioned by the Labour government, and the subsequent White Paper 'Students at the heart of the system' published by the new Conservative-Liberal Democrat coalition in summer 2011 had a substantial impact on QAA's work. The introduction of tuition fees led to increased focus on how quality in higher education was managed and verified. Between 2011 and 2013, in consultation with the higher education sector, QAA phased in a new Quality Code to replace the Academic Infrastructure, and developed a new method of Institutional Review applicable to degree-awarding bodies in England and Northern Ireland, and (with some variation) in Wales. Under a separate method QAA also continued to review degree courses provided at further education colleges (validated by universities).

=== Designation to review alternative providers ===
In spring 2011, under the coalition government, the United Kingdom Border Agency announced a requirement for all private colleges that recruit students to United Kingdom higher education to undergo a standards and quality review by QAA. A successful outcome would be essential in order to obtain 'Tier 4 accreditation' also known as 'highly trusted sponsor' status. QAA accordingly conducted 260 of these 'educational oversight' reviews in the first two years of operation, with 29 providers failing their review. Since the abolition of United KingdomBA, QAA has continued this work under the auspices of United Kingdom Visas and Immigration.

=== Continuing questions about quality and risk ===
Following the coalition government's policy changes there was considerable opening up of higher education to more private providers, leading questions to be raised about the efficacy of the quality assurance system. It was thought by many opinion formers and academics that the 'burden' of review needed to be adjusted according to the 'risk' posed by a particular institution. There was an appetite for established universities to be subject to a lighter touch than further education colleges or new private providers.

In 2012 the Science and Technology Committee of the House of Lords, after considering the working of QAA, concluded that it was still not fit for purpose because its reviews were based on a 'threshold level' of standards that 'allowed no assessment of quality above that threshold' (paragraph 124) and that more needed to be done to improve quality (paragraph 125). The report recommended that QAA should involve employers in the development of subject benchmark statements and in the quality assurance of standards (paragraphs 130-132).

Accordingly, in parallel with its recently introduced 'educational oversight' review methods, QAA developed Higher Education Review, which accommodated more flexibility and was applicable to all institutions subscribing to QAA (recognised and listed bodies).

=== Regulatory reform and designation in England ===
In 2017, the passing of the Higher Education and Research Act created a new regulatory framework for higher education in England, which included a "Designated Quality Body" (DQB). In February 2018, following Department for Education consultation in which 98% of respondents endorsed QAA, the Office for Students recommended QAA's appointment as DQB in England. In addition to this role, QAA continued to maintain United Kingdom-wide responsibilities, including the United Kingdom Quality Code, subject benchmarks and review of United Kingdom transnational education (TNE).

=== Past and present leadership ===
- Chairs of QAA's Board:
  - Christian Brodie, 2025-present
  - Professor Simon Gaskell, 2019–2025
  - Chris Banks CBE, 2014–2019
  - Sir Rodney Brooke, 2009–2014
  - Sam Younger CBE, 2004–2009
  - Sir Christopher Kenyon, 1997–2004
- Chief Executives:
  - Vicki Stott, 2021–2026
  - Douglas Blackstock, 2015–2021
  - Anthony McClaran, 2009–2015
  - Peter Williams CBE, 2001–2009
  - John Randall CBE, 1997–2001
