= Michael Savory =

Lord Mayor of London for 2004–2005

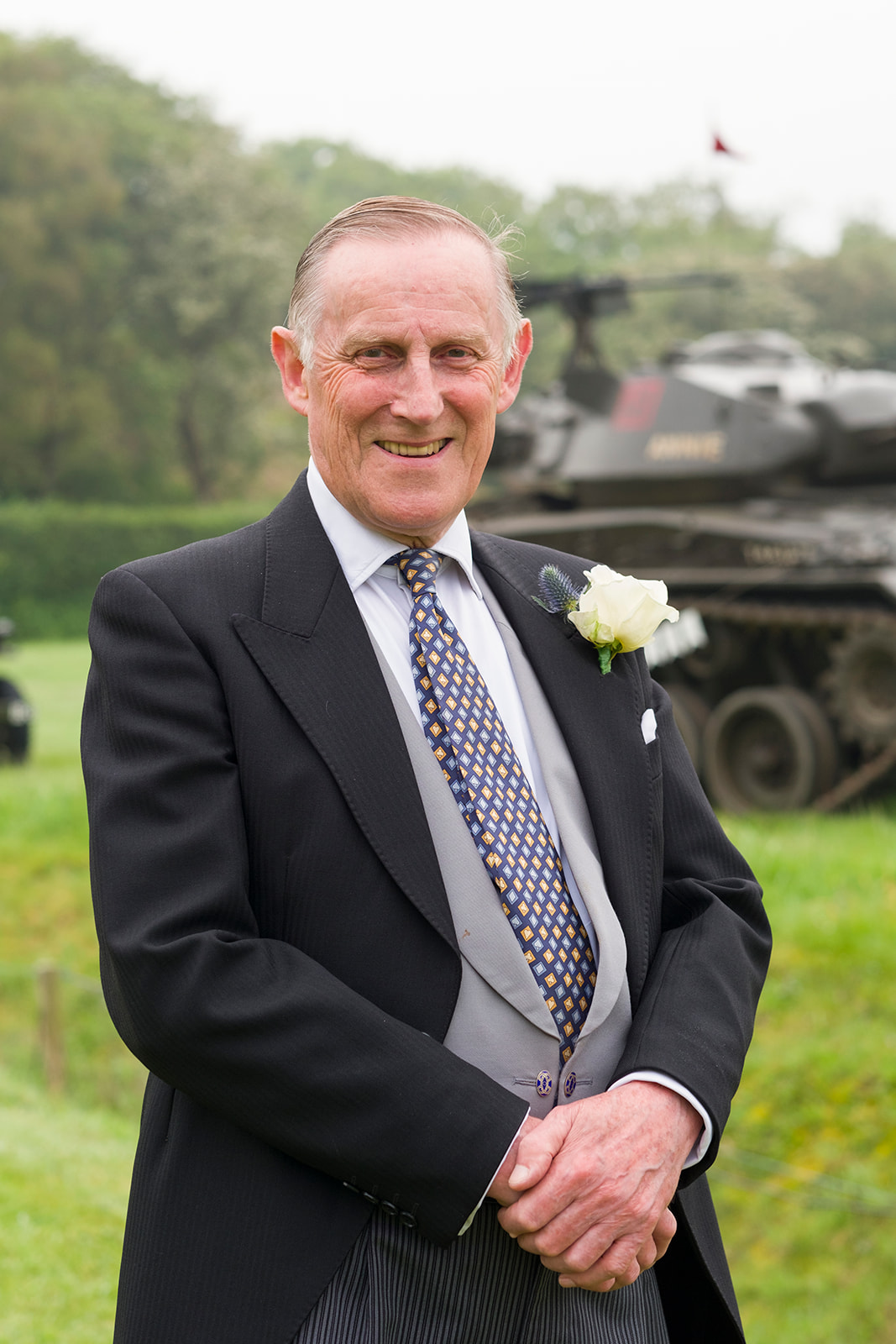
Michael Savory in 2024

Sir Michael Berry Savory (born 1943) was Lord Mayor of London for 2004–2005.

Savory was elected to Common Council in 1980 and as an Alderman in 1996. He served as Sheriff in 2001–2002 and 677th Lord Mayor in 2004–2005. He is currently Managing Partner of the Muckleburgh Collection in North Norfolk.

Knighted in the 2006 New Year Honours for "services to the City of London", Sir Michael was a City stockbroker for forty years and has been Master of two Livery Companies.

== Early life ==
Savory was born in Ayr, Scotland, in 1943. His parents emigrated with him from Norfolk to Southern Rhodesia when he was quite small, but in 1956 he returned to Britain to attend Harrow School.

== Career ==
Savory trained as a stockbroker in New York, after which he joined the family firm of Foster & Braithwaite in 1963, where he specialised in research, fund management and corporate finance. In 1967 he became a partner in the firm, and also became a member of the London Stock Exchange. He became joint senior partner of the firm in 1975, and he remained with the firm until 1989, when the firm was taken over by a French company, whereupon Savory joined the Midland Bank, becoming chairman of Stockbroker Services at the HSBC. He retired in 2005.

Savory is a Fellow of the Securities & Investment Institute. He was chairman of B. T. Batsford, book publishers; and of Terrafix land navigation systems; and he was also chairman of ProShare, which promotes financial education.

== Work with charities ==
In 2006, Savory became Chief Executive of Young Enterprise UK which provides enterprise education to schools throughout the country. For over thirty years he had been a member of the Executive Council of the Soldiers, Sailors, Airmen and Families Association (SSAFA). He was also a member of the Council of The Royal National Mission to Deep Sea Fishermen, and also a trustee of the Hull Fishermens Widows and Orphans Fund for many years.

== City of London ==
In 1964, Savory was elected a liveryman of the Poulters' Company, and he became its Master in 1996. In 1988 he became a liveryman of the Clockmakers' Company, and its Master in 1997. He is a freeman of the Goldsmiths' Company and of the Gunmakers' Company. He is a past liveryman of the Information Technologists' Company, and past member of the Guild of Freemen and the City Livery Club. Savory was elected to the Court of Common Council of the City of London in 1980 becoming an Alderman for the Ward of Bread Street in 1996. He has served on all the principal Committees, and was Sheriff in 2001–2002, Lord Mayor in 2004–2005, and later received a knighthood for his services to the City of London. He was a founding member of the Broad Street Ward Club and served as its chairman in 1981. He was also a churchwarden of the parish church of St Margaret Lothbury.

Civic offices
Preceded by Sir Robert Finch	Lord Mayor of London; 2004–2005	Succeeded by Sir David Brewer
