= Michael Bear (civil engineer) =

683rd Lord Mayor of London (born 1953)

Sir Michael Bear HonFREng
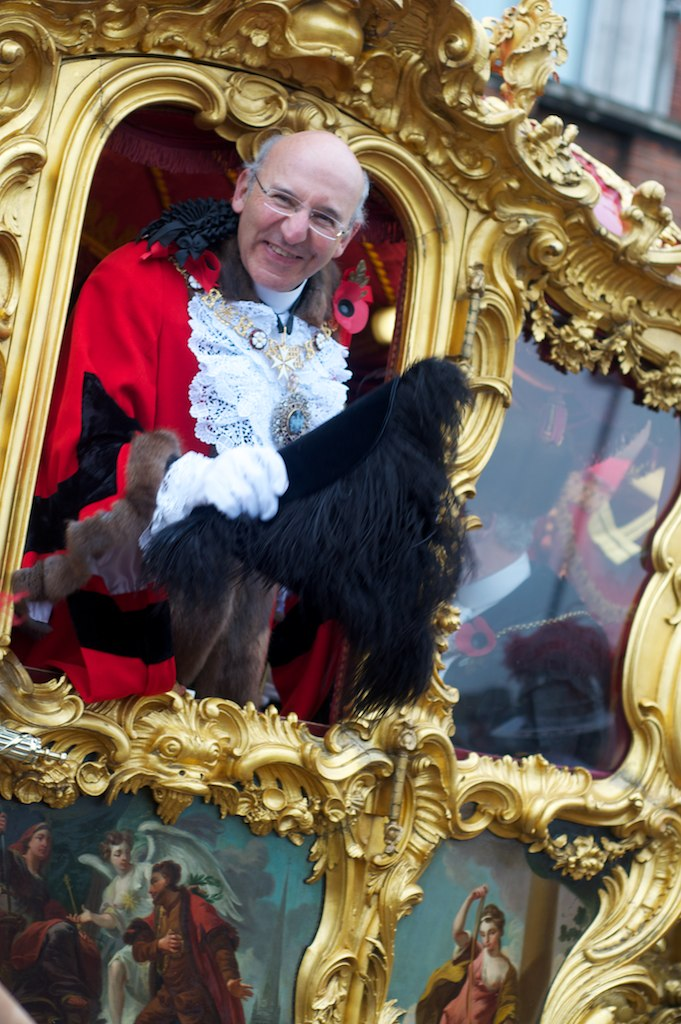

683rd Lord Mayor of London
- In office 12 November 2010 – 11 November 2011
- Preceded by: Nick Anstee
- Succeeded by: Sir David Wootton

Personal details
- Born: 21 January 1953 (age 73) Nairobi, Kenya Colony
- Spouse: Barbara née Sandler
- Children: 2
- Education: University of the Witwatersrand; Cranfield University
- Profession: Property & construction

Sir Michael David Bear (born 21 January 1953, Kenya Colony) was the 683rd Lord Mayor of London, whose one-year term began on 12 November 2010 and ended on 11 November 2011. Until his resignation in 2017, he was the Alderman of the Ward of Portsoken and previously represented that Ward as Common Councilman and Deputy. In 2007, he was elected as Aldermanic Sheriff of London (for a one-year term).

A liveryman of the Paviors' Company, he subsequently joined the Chartered Surveyors' and Engineers' Companies. Bear was a key figure in the redevelopment of Spitalfields Market, situated just to the northeast of the City in Tower Hamlets.

== Early life and education ==
Sir Michael was born in Nairobi, in Kenya Colony, and grew up in Cyprus. Later he went to school at Clifton College in Bristol, before studying at the University of the Witwatersrand in Johannesburg, and Cranfield University in Britain.

== Career ==
Sir Michael is a civil engineer and a management leader in both the construction and property industries in the UK and abroad. He has worked in the international construction industry, managing projects in China, Far East and West Africa. In London, he was responsible for the successful completion of the development of Spitalfields and was Chief Executive of the Spitalfields Development Group. He has served on several leadership roles for the City of London Corporation.

=== As Alderman for Portsoken Ward ===
Bear was the Alderman representing Portsoken ward from 2006 to 2017. He resigned in 2017 and this led to the December 2017 Aldermanic by-election. When it came to light that his successor, Prem Goyal, had printed about 1,000 leaflets using the corporations equipment, Bear made a formal complaint which led to the matter being considered by the standards sub-committee who accepted Goyal's apology as regards to the matter provided he underwent training and repaid the cost of the printing.

=== As Lord Mayor ===
As Lord Mayor, Bear played a promotional role for the Square Mile, and claimed a remit for the whole of the UK-wide financial and professional services industry. He was also ex-officio Chancellor of City University London during his Lord Mayoral term (2010–11). For example, Bear opened the trading session at the Tel Aviv Stock Exchange in July 2011.

Bear was given an Award of Doctor of Science honoris causa by City University London in 2011.

Bear was knighted in the 2012 New Year Honours for services to regeneration, charity and the City of London.

Bear was appointed an Honorary Fellow (Hon FREng) of the Royal Academy of Engineering in 2010.

== Business activities ==
From 1993 to 2012, he was managing director of Balfour Beatty Properties where he specialised in working on private finance initiatives (PFIs) and public-private partnerships (PPPs).

In June 2017, Bear was appointed as Chair of Turley, an independent UK planning consultancy.

== Family ==
Married to Barbara Sandler, they have a son named Marc and a daughter named Amy. Michael has two siblings, Denise and Susan.

Civic offices
Preceded by Nick Anstee	Lord Mayor of London; 2010–2011	Succeeded by Sir David Wootton
