= 1828 Proclamation of Demarcation =

The 1828 Proclamation of Demarcation was issued by George Arthur, governor of Tasmania, and ordered the white colonial populations and Tasmanian Aboriginal populations be temporarily separated from each other. Arthur clarified that the proclamation would not limit Aboriginals from traveling through Tasmania to shellfish hunting territories, provided a passport was coordinated with their leaders. The proclamation was justified as protecting Aboriginals from violence from colonists, and to protect the colonists from "repeated and wanton barbarous murders and other crimes" by the Aboriginals.

The proclamation established a line of military outposts separating the declared Aboriginal and colonial territories, which the Aboriginals were forbidden to pass. Tasmanian Aboriginals were pressed into remote areas of Tasmania, and eventually relocated to Flinders Island; scholar Rod Edmond notes that the pretext of "protecting" the Aboriginals served as a mechanism to clear desirable land for colonial use.
