= General MacArthur (disambiguation) =

Douglas MacArthur (1880–1964) was an American general of the army of World War II and the Korean War.

General MacArthur or McArthur may also refer to:

== People ==
- Arthur MacArthur Jr. (1845–1912), American lieutenant-general and Governor-General of the Philippines, father of Douglas MacArthur
- Duncan McArthur (1772–1839), American brigadier-general during the War of 1812 and Governor of Ohio
- Sir Edward Macarthur (1789–1872), British lieutenant-general and commander-in-chief of British forces in Australia
- John McArthur (general) (1826–1906), Union major-general during the American Civil War

== Other uses ==
- General MacArthur, Eastern Samar, a town in the Philippines named after Douglas MacArthur
- General Macarthur, a fictional character in Agatha Christie's novel And Then There Were None

== See also ==
- General Arthur (disambiguation)
- Sir Denzil Macarthur-Onslow (1904–1984), Australian major-general
- George Macarthur-Onslow (1875–1931), Australian brigadier-general in World War I, uncle of the above
- James Macarthur-Onslow (1867–1946), Australian major-general and politician, brother of the above
