= William Arthur =

William Arthur may refer to:

- William Arthur (botanist) (1680–1716), Scottish botanist
- William Arthur (clergyman) (1796–1875), American Baptist minister and father of Chester A. Arthur
- William Arthur (minister) (1819–1901), Irish Methodist minister
- William Evans Arthur (1825–1897), American politician
- William Arthur (Royal Navy) (1830–1886), British naval officer
- William Hemple Arthur (1856–1936), American general
- William Arthur (mathematician) (1894–1979), Scottish mathematician
- Bill Arthur (William Tevlin Arthur, 1918–1982), Australian politician
- W. Brian Arthur (born 1945), Irish economist

== See also ==
- William Arthur Memorial Church, Gubbi, India
- William, Prince of Wales (William Arthur Philip Louis; born 1982), heir apparent of Charles III, King of the United Kingdom
