= George Arthur (cricketer) =

Australian cricketer (1849–1932)

Personal information
- Full name: George Henry Arthur
- Born: 10 March 1849; Longford, Van Diemen's Land
- Died: 13 November 1932 (aged 83); Longford, Tasmania, Australia
- Relatives: Charles Arthur (father); John Arthur (brother)

Domestic team information
- Years: Team
- 1868/69–1877/78: Tasmania
- FC debut: 12 February 1869 Tasmania v Victoria
- Last FC: 10 November 1877 Tasmania v South Australia

Career statistics
Competition	First-class
Matches	2
Runs scored	33
Batting average	11.00
100s/50s	0/0
Top score	26
Catches/stumpings	0/–
- Source: CricketArchive, 22 August 2010

George Henry Arthur (10 March 1849 – 13 November 1932) was an Australian cricketer, who played for Tasmania; he represented the state in two first-class matches. His father, Charles Arthur, had the distinction of having participated in the first ever first-class cricket match in Australia, and his brother John Arthur also represented Tasmania.

Arthur died on 13 November 1932 in Longford.
