= Dai John (rugby union, born 1902) =

- Full name: David Evan John
- Born: 1 March 1902 Loughor, Wales
- Died: 20 November 1973 (aged 71) Loughor, Wales

Rugby union career
- Position: Outside–half
International career
Years	Team	Apps	(Points)
1923–28	Wales	5	(9)

David Evan John (1 March 1902 – 20 November 1973) was a Welsh international rugby union player.

A native of Loughor, John was an outside–half and played his rugby for Llanelly RFC, where he formed a halfback partnership with Arthur John. He debuted for Wales in their win over France at Swansea during the 1923 Five Nations and appeared sporadically until 1928, scoring three tries from a total of five caps.

Johns was a steelworks crane driver at the time of his Wales call up.

== See also ==
- List of Wales national rugby union players
