= Arthur John =

Arthur John may refer to:

- Arthur John (football manager) (1898–1972), English football manager
- Arthur John (rugby union) (1900—1929), Welsh international rugby union player

== See also ==
- John Arthur (disambiguation)
