= Baron Glenarthur =

Barony in the Peerage of the United Kingdom

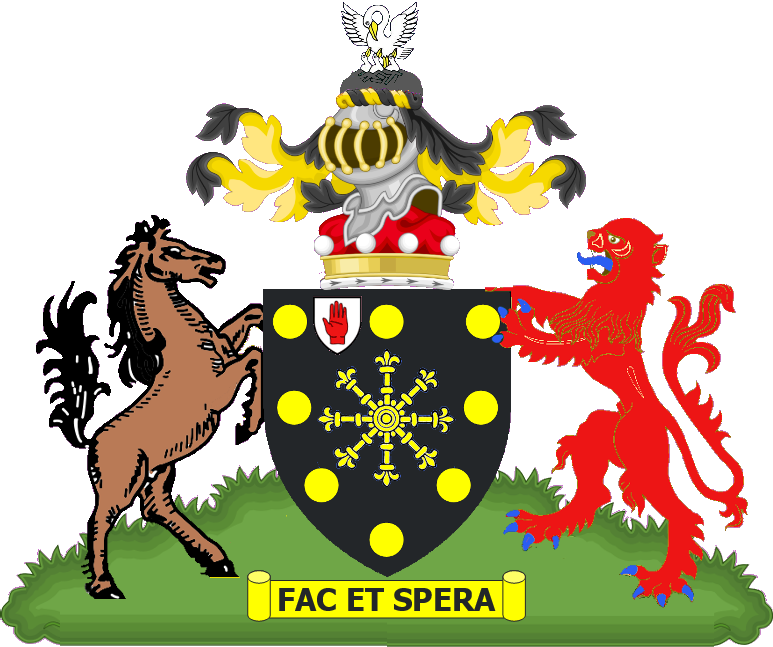
- Crest: On a rock a pelican in her piety Proper.
- Shield: Sable an escarbuncle Or within an orle of bezants.
- Supporters: Dexter a bay horse Proper, sinister a lion rampant Gules.
- Motto: Fac Et Spera

Baron Glenarthur, of Carlung in the County of Ayr, is a title in the Peerage of the United Kingdom. It was created in 1918 for the Scottish businessman Sir Matthew Arthur, 1st Baronet. He had already been created a baronet, of Carlung in the County of Ayr, on 10 January 1903. The title of the barony was derived from the joining of his mother's maiden surname name of Glen and his patronymic Arthur.

He was the oldest son of Glasgow merchant James Arthur, who founded Arthur & Company Limited. Matthew was also first cousin to Sir Thomas Glen-Coats, 1st Baronet. As of 2010, the titles are held by his great-grandson, the fourth Baron, who succeeded his father in 1976. He notably held office in the Conservative administrations of Margaret Thatcher and is now one of the ninety elected hereditary peers that remain in the House of Lords after the passing of the House of Lords Act 1999.

== Arthur baronets, of Carlung (1903) ==
- Matthew Arthur, 1st Baronet (1852–1928) (created Baron Glenarthur in 1918)

=== Baron Glenarthur (1918) ===
- Matthew Arthur, 1st Baron Glenarthur (1852–1928)
- (James) Cecil Arthur, 2nd Baron Glenarthur (1883–1942)
- Matthew Arthur, 3rd Baron Glenarthur (1909–1976)
- Simon Mark Arthur, 4th Baron Glenarthur (born 1944)

The heir apparent is the present holder's only son, the Hon. Edward Alexander Arthur (born 1973).

=== Line of succession ===
- Matthew Arthur, 1st Baron Glenarthur (1852–1928)
  - (James) Cecil Arthur, 2nd Baron Glenarthur (1883–1942)
    - Matthew Arthur, 3rd Baron Glenarthur (1909–1976)
      - Simon Mark Arthur, 4th Baron Glenarthur (born 1944)
        - (1) Hon. Edward Alexander Arthur (born 1973)
      - (2) Hon. Matthew Richard Arthur (born 1948)
        - (3) Matthew Frederick Michael Arthur (born 1981)

== See also ==
- Arthur baronets

Baronetage of the United Kingdom
Preceded by Makins baronets	Arthur baronets of Carlung; 10 January 1903	Succeeded by Nutting baronets
