= Ian Luder =

British politician (born 1951)

Ian Luder CBE JP
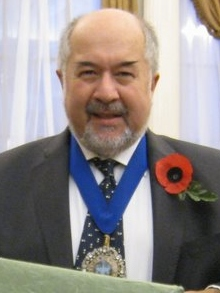
- Luder in 2009

681st Lord Mayor of London
- In office 7 November 2008 – 13 November 2009
- Preceded by: Sir David Lewis
- Succeeded by: Nick Anstee

Personal details
- Born: 13 April 1951 London
- Party: UKIP (after 2011)
- Other political affiliations: Labour (before 2011)
- Education: University College London
- Occupation: Tax accountant

Ian David Luder CBE JP (born 13 April 1951) is a former Lord Mayor of London, serving from 2008 to 2009.

== Biography ==
Born into a Jewish family as the son of a mathematics teacher, Luder attended The Haberdashers' Aske's Boys' School, Elstree before reading Economics and Economic History at University College London (BA). He then worked as a tax accountant for Arthur Andersen and later Grant Thornton. He regularly comments on tax matters and helped to found the Worshipful Company of Tax Advisers, and is a liveryman of the Coopers' Company. He entered local government as a Labour councillor on Bedford Borough Council, serving for 23 years from 1976 to 1999. Luder also stood for Parliament as the Labour candidate for Yeovil in 1979.

Luder was Aldermanic Sheriff of London for 2007–08 and was elected Lord Mayor on 29 September 2008, taking office in the "Silent Ceremony" on 7 November. He was appointed Commander of the Order of the British Empire (CBE) in the 2010 New Year Honours.

In 2008, Luder and his wife were involved in a dispute with their neighbours over the neighbours' cat. Apparently the Luders had refused their neighbours' request to stop feeding the animal, who was overweight and had a heart condition, and in fact had shut the cat in their home for 36 hours while they were away.

On 28 March 2012, Luder was announced as the new chairman of Basildon and Thurrock University Hospitals NHS Foundation Trust. He took up the post on 1 July that year. Shortly after his selection in January 2015 as a UKIP candidate for the 2015 general election, Luder stood down as Trust chairman.

=== Politics ===
In December 2014, Luder was one of five people on the shortlist to become United Kingdom Independence Party (UKIP) candidate for the constituency of South Basildon and East Thurrock at the 2015 general election. At the initial selection meeting he was not chosen as the candidate. Shortly afterwards, the successful candidate, Kerry Smith, resigned as UKIP's nominee for the seat after he was recorded making offensive remarks about fellow party members in a telephone conversation. A new selection was held in January 2015, which Luder won. Luder contested the general election and came second, polling 12,097 votes (26.5% of the total), 7,692 votes behind the incumbent Conservative candidate, Stephen Metcalfe. Smith polled 401 votes and finished in fifth place.

Civic offices
Preceded by Sir David Lewis	Lord Mayor of London; 2008–2009	Succeeded by Nick Anstee
