= Worshipful Company of Educators =

Livery company of the City of London

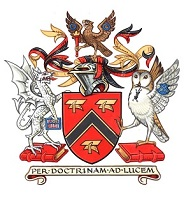
- Motto: Per Doctrinam ad Lucem (Through learning to light)
- Location: 8 Little Trinity Lane; London, EC4
- Date of formation: 2001
- Company association: Education
- Order of precedence: 109th
- Master of company: Anthony McClaran
- Website: www.co-educators.com

The Worshipful Company of Educators is the 109th livery company of the City of London, having been granted livery status on 10 September 2013 by the Court of Aldermen. The Company was founded on 24 May 2001 as a Guild to represent the education and training profession and for charitable purposes. On 15 September 2009 the City's Court of Aldermen granted the petition of the Guild of Educators and agreed that the Guild be constituted one of the Companies of the City, without a grant of livery, with the title of The Company of Educators and that its Ordinances be approved and duly enrolled amongst the records of the City. Upon being advanced to the status of City livery company in 2013, the Company was accorded the official title of Worshipful Company of Educators, although less formally it can continue to be known as the Educators' Company.

On 14 June 2017, the Worshipful Company of Educators was granted a Royal Charter by the Queen. The Company provides a forum through meetings and social occasions to bring together members from all parts of the education world to discuss and exchange views on matters of topical interest. The Educators' Trust provides Awards and Bursaries for outstanding, innovative and inspirational practice in a wide range of educational subjects, levels and settings.

== Masters ==
	Term of office	Name
1st Master	2001/02	Professor R N Franklin CBE
2nd Master	2002/03	Judith G Osborne
3rd Master	2003/04	P Max Weaver Esq
4th Master	2004/05	Dr Nicholas A D Carey FCGI
5th Master	2005/06	Professor Sir Roderick Floud FBA FCGI
6th Master	2006/07	Dr David S Moore OBE TD
7th Master	2007/08	Dr Peter T Warren CBE
8th Master	2008/09	David W Taylor Esq
9th Master	2009/10	Dr Yvonne Ann Burne OBE JP
10th Master	2010/11	Professor Raymond P Clark OBE
11th Master	2011/12	Dr M Peter Briggs OBE
12th Master	2012/13	Martin F Cross Esq
13th Master	2013/14	Sir John Stuttard JP FCA
14th Master	2014/15	Peter R Williams CBE
15th Master	2015/16	John Leighfield CBE
16th Master	2016/17	Dr S Martin Gaskell DL
17th Master	2017/18	Susan Fey OBE
18th Master	2018/19	Dr Lis Goodwin
19th Master	2019/20	Pam Taylor
20th Master	2020/21	Richard Evans
21st Master	2021/22	Roy Blackwell
22nd Master	2022/23	Caroline Haines
23nd Master	2023/24	Janet Reynolds
24th Master	2024/25	Catherine McGuinness CBE
25th Master	2025/26	David Wootton CBE DL
26th Master	2026-27	Professor Anthony McClaran

== The Educators' Trust ==
In accordance with the philanthropic tradition of the City of London Livery Companies, the Worshipful Company of Educators operates a separate charitable fund (Charity Reg. No. 110435). It does so to support the development of those who are engaged in the profession of education, development and training.

The objects of the charitable Trust are:

- To reward excellence and innovation in their achievement and training in order to encourage both students and their mentors to undertake, and the public to appreciate, the work of educators
- To promote, by the award of bursaries and grants and other appropriate means, the development of educators through research and study that is appropriate to the profession of educator and that increases understanding of relevant opportunities and needs
- To advance education and its delivery through promotion of public presentations and discussion of relevant developments, and the generation of reports to policy-making bodies and the general public.

== Officers of the Court ==
Master	Immediate Past Master	Upper Warden	Middle Warden	Lower Warden	Renter Warden	Clerk	Chaplain
Anthony McClaran	David Wootton CBE DL	Louise Starling	Richard Logue	Moawia Bin-Sufyan MBE	Mark Williams	Christian Jensen	The Reverend Mark Perry

== Special Interest Groups ==
The Company currently has ten special interest groups: Higher Education (SIGHE), Special Education Needs & Disability (SIGSEND), Careers Information and Guidance (SIGCIG), Education in the Justice System (SIGECJS), Further Education, Skills & Lifelong Learning (SIGFESL), Environmental and Outdoor Education (SIGEOE), School Improvement and Leadership (SIGSIL), Multi Academy Trusts (SIGMAT), Military Education (SIGME) and Arts and Cultural Education (SIGARTS)

== Company Church ==
- St James Garlickhythe
