= Matthew Arthur, 1st Baron Glenarthur =

Scottish businessman

The Right Honourable The Lord Glenarthur JP DL
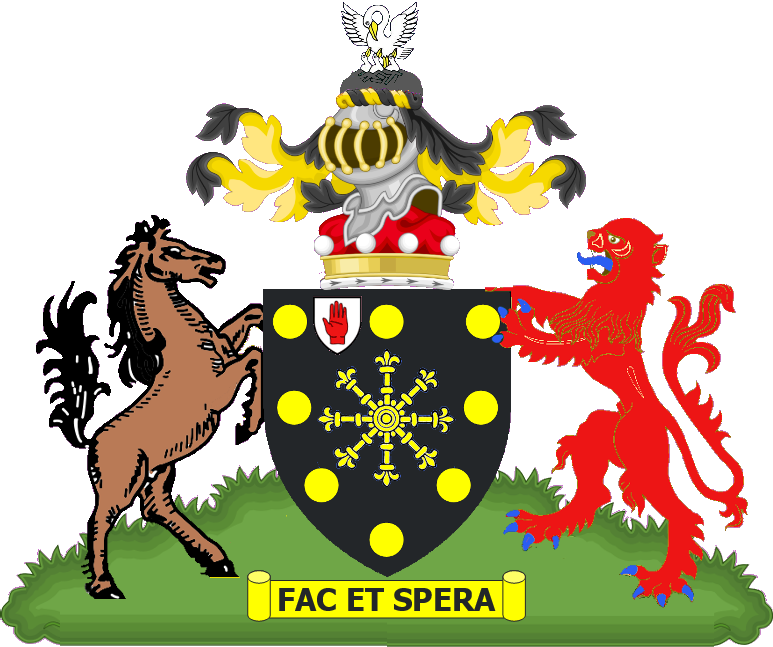

Member of the House of Lords Lord Temporal
- In office 5 July 1918 – 23 September 1928 as a hereditary peer
- Preceded by: Peerage created
- Succeeded by: The 2nd Baron Glenarthur

Personal details
- Born: 9 March 1852
- Died: 23 September 1928 (aged 76)

Matthew Arthur, 1st Baron Glenarthur, JP, DL (9 March 1852 – 23 September 1928), known as Sir Matthew Arthur, 1st Baronet, from 1903 to 1918, was a Scottish businessman.

== Background ==
Glenarthur was son of James Arthur of Carlung in Ayrshire and of Barshaw in Renfrewshire, the founder of the wholesale clothing business of Arthur & Co. His mother was the suffragist and philanthropist Jane Glen Arthur, daughter of Thomas Glen of Thornhill in Renfrewshire.

== Career ==
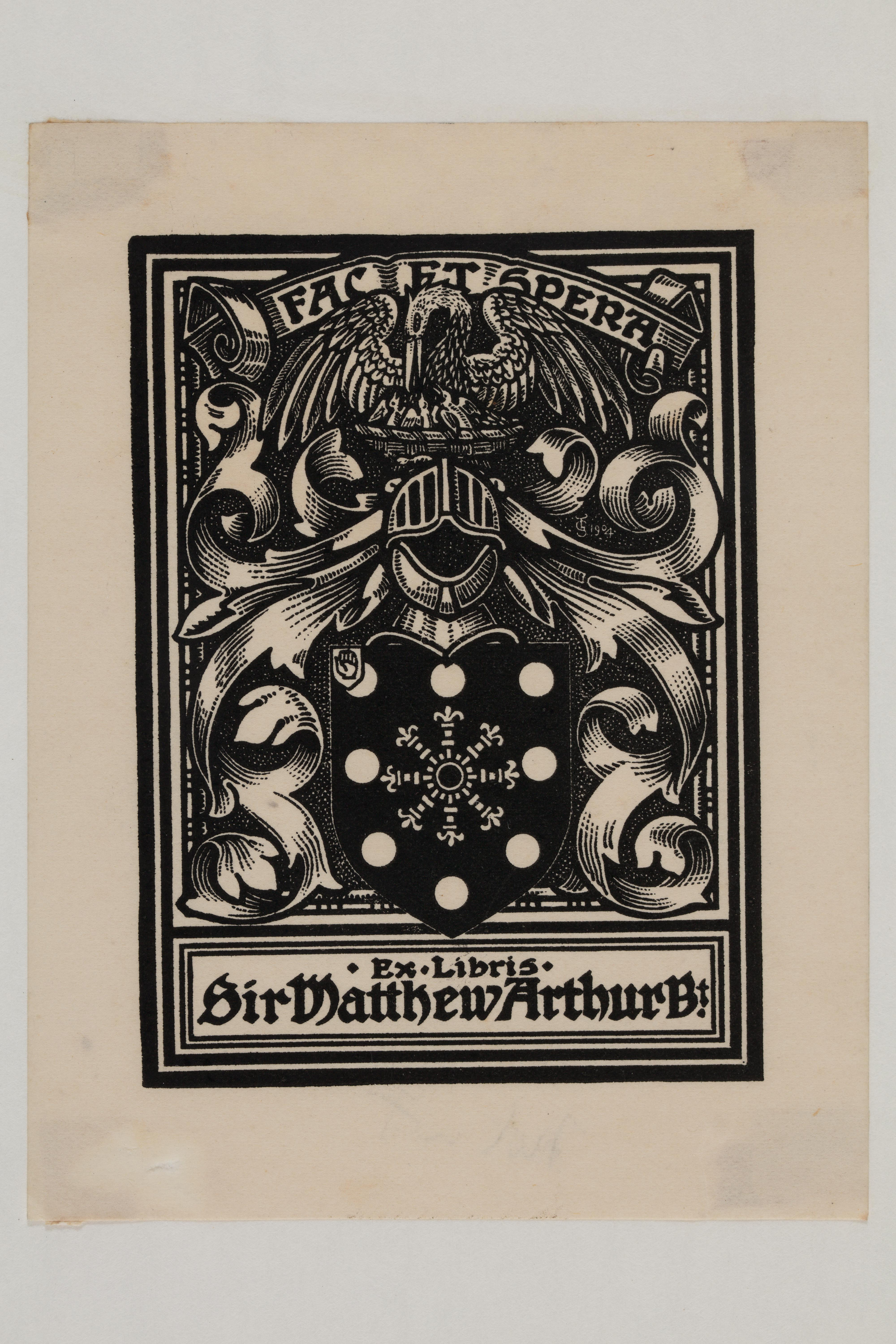
Bookplate of Sir Matthew Arthur Bt, 1904.

Glenarthur was Chairman of the family firm of Arthur and Co, and also of the Lochgelly Iron and Coal Company and of the Glasgow and South Western Railway Company. Apart from his business career he was also a member of the Royal Company of Archers.

== Honours ==
Arthur was created a Baronet, of Carlung, in the parish of West Kilbride, in the County of Ayr, on 28 November 1902, and on 5 July 1918 he was raised to the peerage as Baron Glenarthur, of Carlung, in the County of Ayr. The title of the barony derived from the joining of his mother's maiden name and his patronymic.

Coat of arms of Matthew Arthur, 1st Baron Glenarthur

Crest
On a rock a pelican in her piety Proper.
Escutcheon
Sable an escarbuncle Or within an orle of bezants.
Supporters
Dexter a bay horse Proper, sinister a lion rampant Gules.
Motto
Fac Et Spera

== Family ==
Lord Glenarthur married Janet McGrigor, daughter of Alexander Bennett McGrigor, in 1876. He died in September 1928, aged 76, and was succeeded in his titles by his son Cecil. Lady Glenarthur died in 1946.

Peerage of the United Kingdom
New creation	Baron Glenarthur; 1918–1928; Member of the House of Lords (1918–1928)	Succeeded by Cecil Arthur
Baronetage of the United Kingdom
New creation	Baronet (of Carlung); 1903–1928	Succeeded by Cecil Arthur
