= Peter Williams (educationalist) =

Peter Williams CBE
- Born: Peter Robert Williams; 20 April 1948 (age 77); Oxford, England
- Education: University of Exeter
- Occupation: Educationalist
- Years active: 1970 -

Peter Williams CBE (born 20 April 1948) is the former Chief Executive of the Quality Assurance Agency for Higher Education (QAA), and the current Honorary President of the British Accreditation Council for Independent Further and Higher Education (BAC). He was given a CBE for his services to higher education in 2009.

== Education ==
Peter Williams attended the City of Oxford High School for Boys and has a degree in English from the University of Exeter.

== Career ==
- 1969 Management Trainee, Hazell, Watson and Viney (printers)
- 1970 Registry office, University of Surrey
- 1974 Higher Degrees Office, University of Leicester
- 1978 Assistant Registrar, Medical School, University of Leicester
- 1982 Secretary, Medical School, University of Leicester
- 1984 Deputy Secretary, British Academy
- 1990 Director (first and only), Committee of Vice-Chancellors and Principals of the Universities of the United Kingdom (CVCP), Academic Audit Unit (AAU)
- 1992 Director of the Quality Assurance Group of the Higher Education Quality Council (HEQC)
- 1997 Director of Institutional Review in the Quality Assurance Agency for Higher Education (QAA),
- 2001 Acting Chief Executive, Quality Assurance Agency for Higher Education (QAA)
- 2002-2009 Chief Executive of QAA
- 2005-8 President, European Association for Quality Assurance in Higher Education ([ENQA])
- 2009 Retired
- 2009-2016 Governor, Vice-chair and Chair of Audit Committee, Cardiff Metropolitan University
- 2011-2017 Member, Education Honours Committee
- 2012-18 Chair, British Accreditation Council for Independent Further and Higher Education
- 2019 - Honorary President, British Accreditation Council for Independent Further and Higher Education
- 2012-19 Trustee, Richmond The American International University in London
- 2014-15 Master, Worshipful Company of Educators
- 2017- Trustee, Norfolk Archives and Heritage Development Foundation (NORAH)
- 2017-2022 Chair, Norfolk Archives and Heritage Development Foundation (NORAH)
- 2018 - Trustee, The Educators' Trust
- 2023 - Trustee, Heritage Education Trust
