= Hellandbridge =

Hamlet in Cornwall, England

Coordinates: 50°30′40″N 4°43′52″W

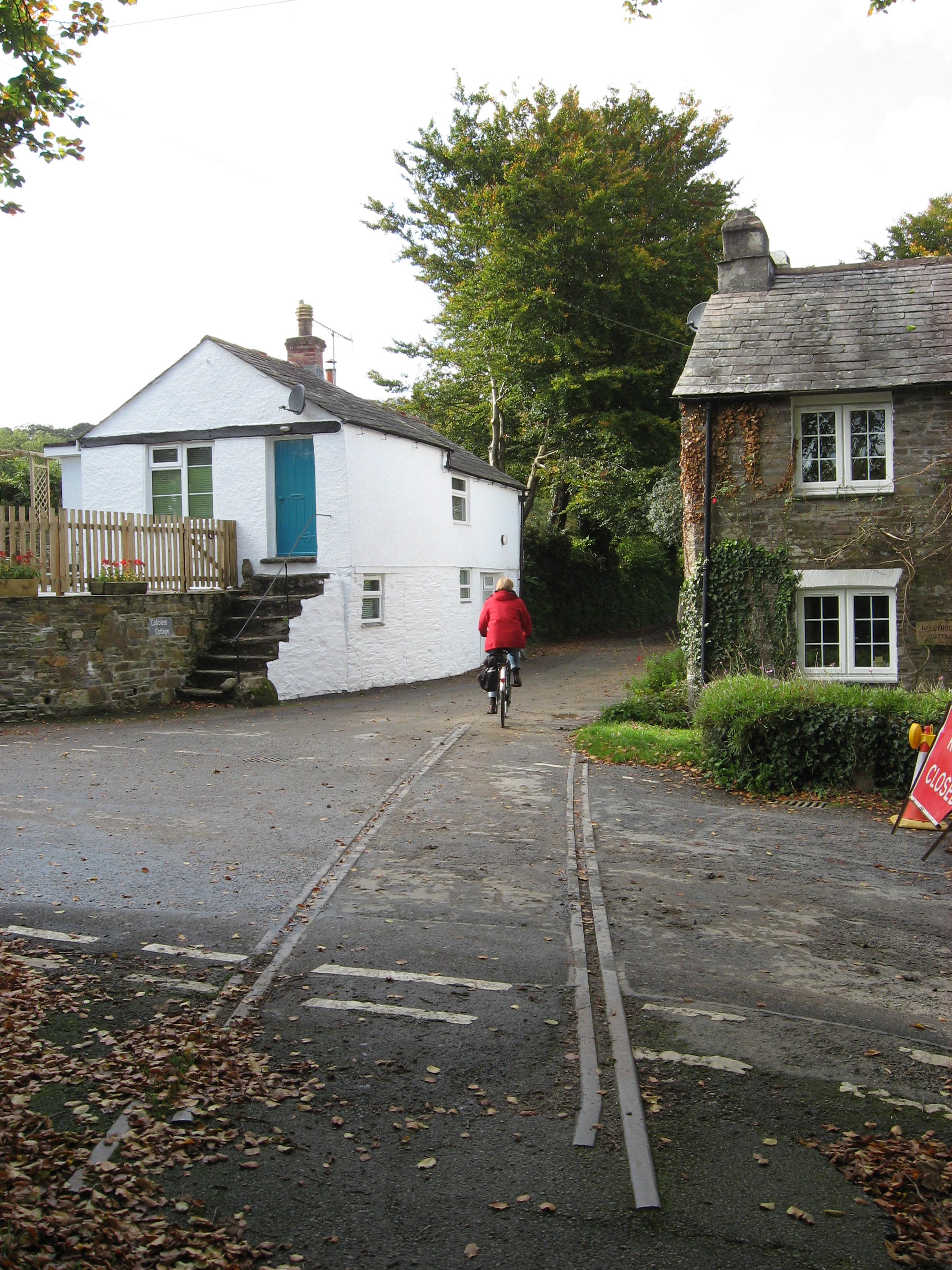
Hellandbridge

Hellandbridge (Cornish: Ponshellan) is a hamlet in Cornwall, England, UK. It is about a mile west-northwest of the village of Helland (where the population at the 2011 census was included) on the River Camel and next to the railway line to Wenford Bridge.
