= Robert Arthur =

Robert Arthur may refer to:

- Robert Arthur Jr. (1909–1969), American novelist and radio scriptwriter
- Robert Arthur (film producer) (1909–1986), American film producer
- Robert Arthur (radio announcer) (1921–1997), of "Ken and Bob Show"
- Robert Alan Aurthur (1922–1978), American screenwriter, director and TV producer
- Robert Arthur (actor) (1925–2008), American actor
- Robert Arthur (cricketer) (1866–1948), Barbadian cricketer
- Bobby Arthur (1947–2023), English boxer
- Gordon Arthur (bishop) (Robert Gordon Arthur, 1909–1992), Anglican bishop in Australia
