= Frederick Arthur =

British soldier

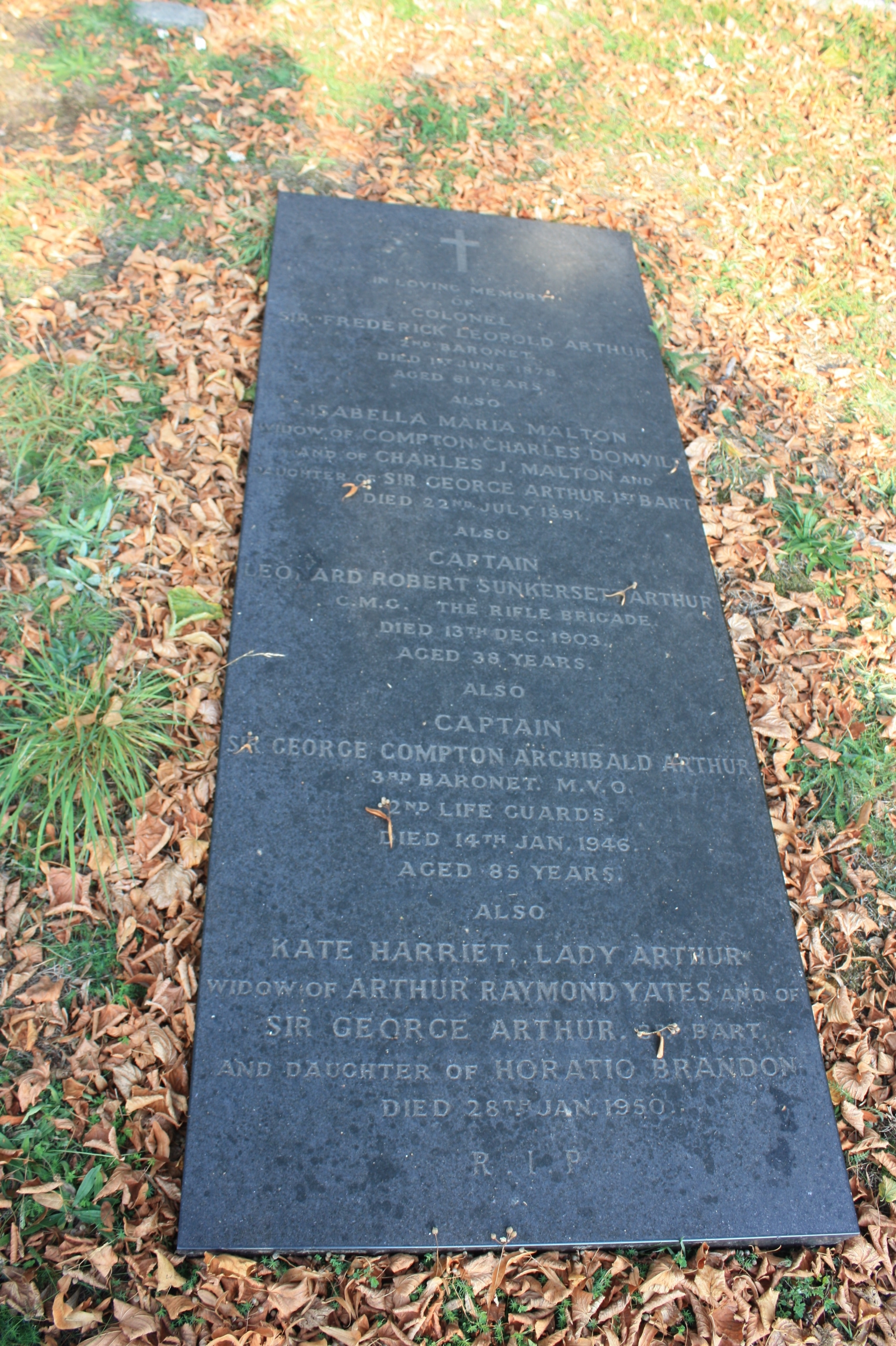
The grave of Sir Frederick Leopold Arthur, Brompton Cemetery, London

Sir Frederick Leopold Arthur, 2nd Baronet (20 December 1816 in Plymouth – 1 June 1878) was a British soldier.

The son of Sir George Arthur, 1st Bt and Eliza Orde Smith, he was commissioned into the 4th Foot in 1833. He transferred to the 40th Foot in 1850 and the 18th Hussars in 1863. He became a colonel, and succeeded to the baronetcy in 1854.

On 24 April 1856, he married Lady Elizabeth Hay-Drummond, daughter of the Earl of Kinnoull. They had three children:

- Frederica Louisa Juliana Arthur (d. 23 March 1946), married Alfred Darby
- Sir George Compton Archibald Arthur, 3rd Bt (1860–1946)
- Captain Leonard Robert Sunkersett Arthur, CMG (23 December 1864 – 13 December 1903), died unmarried

He is buried on the eastern edge of Brompton Cemetery in London with his sister, Isabella Maria Malton, his two sons, George* and Leonard, and Kate Harriet, George's* wife ( i.e. The wife of George* the son of Frederick).

Coat of arms of Frederick Arthur
Crest In front of two swords in saltire Proper pommels and hilts Or a pelican in her piety Sable the nest Or. Escutcheon Or on a chevron Azure between two clarions in chief Gules and a kangaroo sejant in base Proper two swords the points upwards also Proper points and hilts of the first on a chief of the third a horse courant Argent. Motto Stet Fortuna Domus (May The Fortune of the House Stand)

Baronetage of the United Kingdom
Preceded by George Arthur	Baronet (of Upper Canada); 1854–1878	Succeeded by George Compton Archibald Arthur
