= Michael Arthur =

Michael Arthur may refer to:

- Michael Arthur (physician) (born 1954), Vice-Chancellor of the University of Leeds, 2004–2013 and President and Provost of UCL 2013–2021
- Michael Anthony Arthur (born 1950), British diplomat
- Mike Arthur (born 1968), American football player
- Mickey Arthur (born 1968), South African-Australian cricketer
