= John Dada Arthur =

Ghanaian association football player

John Arthur
Personal information
- Full name: John Dada Arthur
- Date of birth: June 19, 1994 (age 32)
- Place of birth: Accra, Ghana
- Position: Attacking midfielder

Youth career
- 2013–2014: Tarkwa United FC

Senior career*
Years	Team	Apps	(Gls)
2014–2015	Ebusua Dwarfs	15	(9)
2014–2015	Al Khartoum SC	12	(6)
2015–2016	Al Ahli SC (Khartoum)	9	(4)
2017–2018	Medeama SC	15	(5)
- * Club domestic league appearances and goals

John Arthur (born 19 June 1994) is a Ghanaian professional footballer who plays as a midfielder.

== Career ==
Arthur began his career for Tarkwa United FC and joined in 2014 to Ebusua Dwarfs. After two years for Ebusua Dwarfs in January 2015 to Al Khartoum SC and Al Ahli SC (Khartoum) in 2016.

On January 10, 2017, Arthur joined Medeama SC as free agent and terminated his contract on a mutual agreement on October 15, 2018.

=== Position ===
He is usually fielded as attacking midfielder.
