= David Lewis (lord mayor) =

British politician (born 1947)

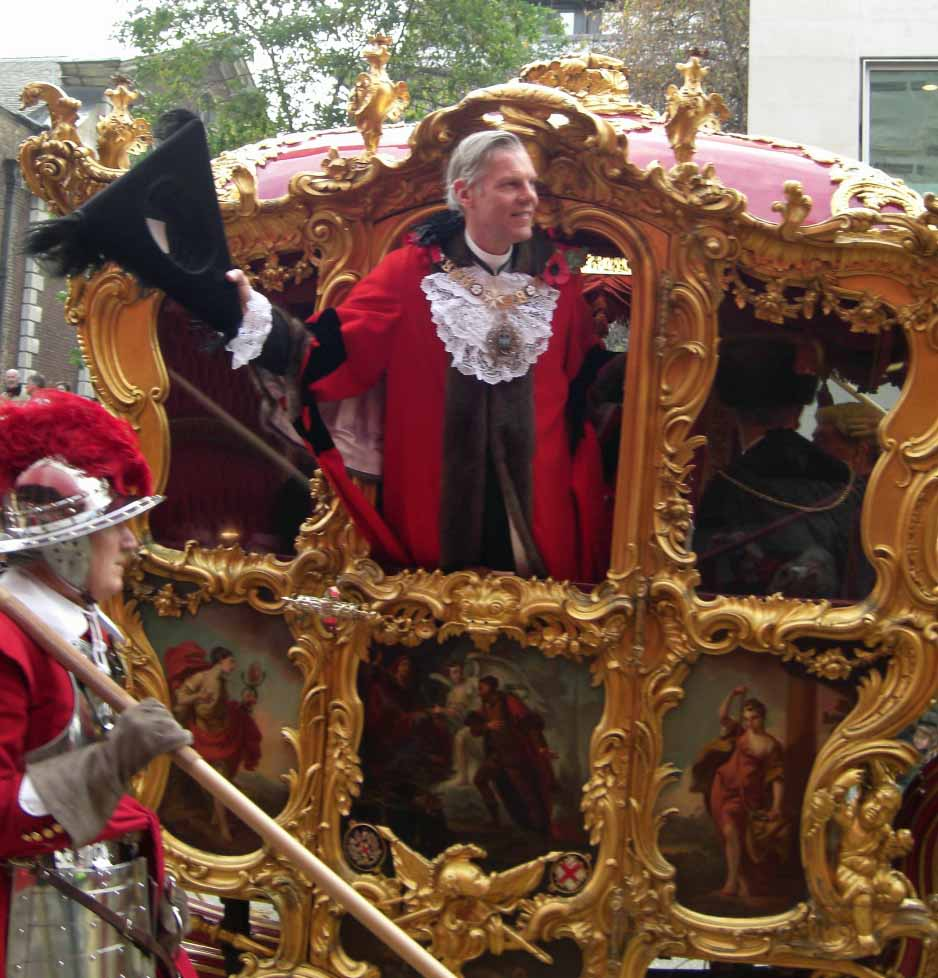
David Lewis in the 2007 Lord Mayor's Show

Sir David Thomas Rowell Lewis (born 1 November 1947 in Hong Kong) was the Lord Mayor of London for 2007 and 2008.

== Biography ==
Lewis was born in Hong Kong, the grandson of a sheep-farmer from Carmarthenshire, Wales and regards himself as half Welsh and half Manx. He was brought up and educated in Malaya and then at the Dragon School and St Edward's School, Oxford before reading Jurisprudence at Jesus College, Oxford. At Oxford he represented OUAC and Achilles without gaining a blue.

He joined Norton Rose in 1969 and qualified as a solicitor with honours in 1972, and in 1977 in Hong Kong. He becoming a Partner in 1977, serving as managing partner of the Hong Kong office in 1979–1982; head of corporate finance; head of professional resources, education, training and quality control; and then as chairman and Senior Partner between 1997 and 2003. He then served as a part-time consultant retiring in 2013 after 44 years with the firm. In 1986 he was named as one of BusinessAge magazine's Top 40 young businessmen of the year aged under 40. Lewis specialised in takeovers and mergers and public company share issues. In 1999 Norton Rose was the first UK law firm to win a Queen's Award for Exports. Lewis has served as a NED of Standard Life, and as a member of the Isle of Man Financial Supervision Commission.

He was elected as a City Alderman of Broad Street Ward in 2001 and then as Sheriff of London in 2006–7. He became the 680th Lord Mayor in 2007–8, being only the eighth Welsh Lord Mayor in the City of London's history, and the first to have a Welsh heraldic motto (Aim as high as the sun). Upon the completion of his year of office Lewis was knighted in the 2009 New Year Honours List. He retired as an Alderman in 2013.

His public and charitable service includes: Governor of the Dragon School Oxford (1987–2017)(chairman 2003–8); churchwarden of St Margaret's Church Lothbury (2001–13); Almoner/Governor of Christ's Hospital (2004–10)(school chairman 2010); chairman Oxford Univ Law Development Council (2003–6); trustee Oxford Univ Law Foundation (1997–2007); member Oxford Univ Chancellor's court of benefactors (1997–2010) and of VC's circle of benefactors since 2010; member of Council of Oxford Brookes Univ (1995–2003), of Lampeter Univ, and of Swansea Univ (2014–16); Chancellor of City Univ (2007–8); Chairman of HM Commissiomers of City of London (Lord Lieutenant) 2007–8; president Lord Mayor's Appeal 2007-8 for Wellbeing of Women and ORBIS, and trustee of both charities; president of St Edward's School Society (1995); co-founded the annual Sheriffs' Award for Bravery at the Old Bailey 2007; co-founded the annual Lord Mayor's Big Curry Lunch 2008 for Army Benevolent Fund; magistrate in City of London and in Carmarthenshire 2001–11; liveryman of City of London Solicitors Company (Master 2009–10), of Fletchers Company, of Welsh Livery Guild, and Hon Liveryman of Security Professionals Company; president of City of London Law Society (2009–10); City of London Law Soc company law committee (1982–97); Law Soc Legal Practice Course committee (2009–12); Governor/ Chairman of The Hon The Irish Society (2009–12). Lewis endowed in perpetuity at Jesus College Oxford (a) a Law Fellowship in 2010, (b) the Sir Peter North Fund for bursaries, and (c) the Francis Jones annual prize for the best book or article on any era of Welsh history in 2017.

His honours and awards include: Knight Bachelor for services to the legal profession and to the City of London in New Years Honours 2009; St David's Award on 1 March 2008 from First Minister for Wales; Hon Fellow Jesus College Oxford (1998) and Queen Elizabeth 1 Fellow (2012); Knight of Justice of Order of St John (KStJ) (2007); Companion of League of Mercy (2008); Hon DCL City Univ (2007); Hon DCL Univ of Wales (2008); Hon Fellow of Cardiff Univ (2008), of Trinity Univ Coll Carmarthen (2009), and of Guildhall School of Music and Drama (2008); Hon Professor of Hunan Univ (2008), of Xiaman Univ (2008) and of Cardiff Business School (2009); Dep-Lieutenant Carms (2009–19).

His published works include: Cynwyl Gaeo-Land of My Fathers (2009); Family Histories and Community Life in North Carmarthenshire (2012); Dolaucothi and Brunant-A Tale of Two Families in Wales (2016); A History of the Edwinsford and Clovelly Communities (2017); The Vaughan (Earls of Carbery) and Campbell (Earls and Thanes of Cawdor) Families of Golden Grove Carmarthenshire (2018); The Families of Gogerddan in Cardiganshire and Aberglasney in Carmarthenshire (2020); Aim as High as the Sun-Family History and Memoirs (2020); The Rhys, Rice and Dynevor Families of Dinefwr Castle and Newton House (2022); A History of Chirk Castle and of the Myddelton/Middleton Families (2024); and Past Principals of Jesus College Oxford 1571-1984 (2025).

Civic offices
Preceded by Sir John Stuttard	Lord Mayor of London; 2007–2008	Succeeded by Ian Luder
