= Lestock Robert Reid =

English colonial administrator

Lestock Robert Reid FRGS (12 August 1799 – 27 October 1878) was an English colonial administrator who was Governor of Bombay from 1846 to 1847 during the rule of the East India Company.

He served in the Bombay Civil Service from 1817 to 1850 and was President of the Bombay Branch of The Asiatic Society from 1846 to 1849.

One of his daughters, Jane Florence Harriet Reid, married Thomas Livingstone Learmonth.
