= Anthony Arthur (author) =

American author and educator

Richard Anthony Arthur (January 20, 1937 – December 15, 2009) was an American author and educator.

Educated in Pennsylvania and later California, Arthur spent three years in the US Army before becoming a journalist in Arizona. He returned to education and completed an MA in English at Penn State University and in 1970 completed his PhD in English. He was a Fulbright Scholar

Arthur retired in 2002 from California State University, Northridge. He died in 2009.

== Bibliography ==
- American Prose and Criticism, 1900-1950, with Peter A. Brier, Gale Research, 1981
- Deliverance at Los Banos, St. Martin's Press, 1985
- Bushmasters, America's Jungle Warriors of World War II, St. Martin's Press, 1987
- The Tailor-King: The Rise and Fall of the Anabaptist Kingdom of Munster, New York: St. Martins Press, 1999 ISBN 0-312-20515-5
- Literary Feuds: A Century of Celebrated Quarrels--from Mark Twain to Tom Wolfe, New York: St. Martin's Press, 2002
- Clashes of Will: Great Confrontations That Have Shaped Modern America, with John Broesamle, 2004
- Twelve Great Clashes That Shaped Modern America: From Geronimo to George W. Bush, with John Broesamle, 2006
- Radical Innocent: Upton Sinclair, Random House, 2006
- General Jo Shelby's March, Random House, 2010
