= Arthur John (rugby union) =

- Full name: David Arthur John
- Born: 11 May 1900 Gowerton, Wales
- Died: 16 August 1929 (aged 29) Chelsea, London, England

Rugby union career
- Position: Inside-half
International career
Years	Team	Apps	(Points)
1925–28	Wales	4	(0)

David Arthur John (11 May 1900 — 16 August 1929) was a Welsh international rugby union player.

John was born in Gowerton and educated at Gowerton Council School.

An inside-half, John was capped five times for Wales, with one cap in 1925 and a further three in 1928. He formed a successful halfback partnership with Dai John (no relation) at Llanelly RFC, where he spent five seasons, and also played some rugby for Bedford while working in England.

John died in a London hospital in 1929 at the age of 29, having been ill for over a year.

== See also ==
- List of Wales national rugby union players
