= Charles Arthur =

Australian cricketer (1808–1884)

Personal information
- Full name: Charles Arthur
- Born: 5 February 1808; Plymouth, England
- Died: 29 July 1884 (aged 76); Longford, Tasmania, Australia
- Relatives: George Arthur (son); John Arthur (son)

Domestic team information
- Years: Team
- 1851: Tasmania
- Only FC: 11 February 1851 Tasmania v Victoria

Career statistics
| Competition | First-class |
|---|---|
| Matches | 1 |
| Runs scored | 1 |
| Batting average | 0.50 |
| 100s/50s | 0/0 |
| Top score | 1 |
| Catches/stumpings | 0/– |
- Source: CricketArchive, 22 August 2010

Charles Arthur (5 February 1808 – 29 July 1884) was an Australian public servant and cricketer. He played in Van Diemen's Land v Port Phillip, 1851, the inaugural first-class cricket match in Australia.

Arthur was the nephew of George Arthur and arrived in Van Diemen's Land in 1824 where his uncle had been appointed lieutenant-governor. He acted as his uncle's private secretary and aide-de-camp. He later became a police magistrate at New Norfolk. His son John Arthur also played first-class cricket for Tasmania.
