= Sir George Arthur, 1st Baronet =

English colonial administrator (1784–1854)

Lieutenant-General The Right Honourable Sir George Arthur Bt KCH
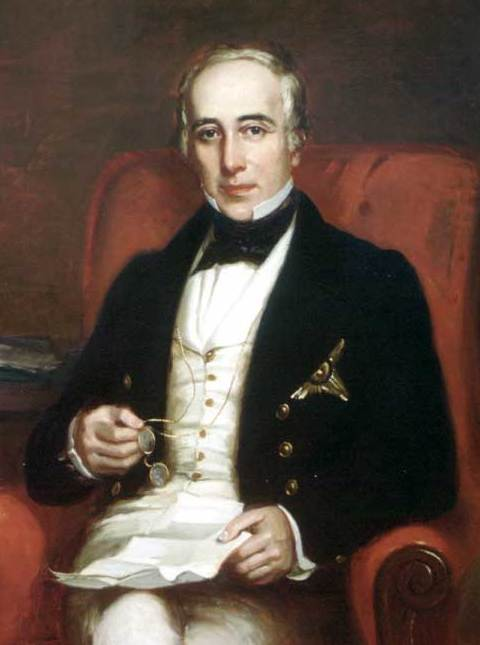

Superintendent of British Honduras
- In office 1814–1822
- Preceded by: John Nugent Smyth
- Succeeded by: Allan Hampden Pye

Lieutenant Governor of Van Diemen's Land
- In office 14 May 1824 – 29 October 1836
- Preceded by: William Sorell
- Succeeded by: Sir John Franklin

Lieutenant Governor of Upper Canada
- In office 1838–1839
- Preceded by: Sir Francis Bond
- Succeeded by: The Lord Sydenham

Governor of Bombay
- In office 9 June 1842 – 6 August 1846
- Preceded by: Sir James Rivett-Carnac
- Succeeded by: Lestock Robert Reid

Personal details
- Born: 21 June 1784 Plymouth, England
- Died: 19 September 1854 (aged 70) London, England
- Spouse: Eliza Orde Usher Smith
- Relations: Charles Arthur (nephew)

Sir George Arthur, 1st Baronet, KCH, PC (21 June 1784 – 19 September 1854) was a British colonial administrator who was Lieutenant Governor of British Honduras from 1814 to 1822 and of Van Diemen's Land (present-day Tasmania) from 1824 to 1836. The campaign against Aboriginal Tasmanians, known as the Black War, occurred during this term of office. He later served as Lieutenant Governor of Upper Canada from 1838 to 1841, and Governor of Bombay from 1842 to 1846.

== Early life ==
George Arthur was born in Plymouth, England. He was the youngest son of John Arthur, from a Cornish family, and his wife, Catherine, daughter of Thomas Cornish. He entered the army in 1804 as an ensign and was promoted lieutenant in June 1805. He served during the Napoleonic Wars, including Sir James Craig's expedition to Italy in 1806. In 1807 he went to Egypt, and was severely wounded in the attack upon Rosetta. He recuperated and was promoted to captain under Sir James Kempt in Sicily in 1808, and participated in the Walcheren expedition in 1809.

== Family ==
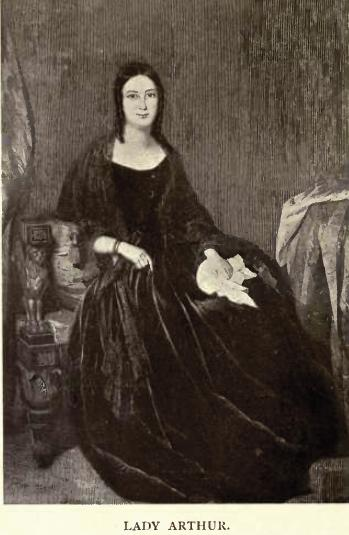
Lady Eliza Orde Ussher Arthur

Major George Arthur married Eliza Orde Ussher, daughter of Lieut.-Gen. Sir John Sigismund Smith, K.C.B., in May 1814. Lady Arthur lived in Toronto, Ontario 1838–41 with three of the couple's sons and their five daughters. She died in London, England, 14 January 1855. Their daughter Catherine married Sir Henry Bartle Frere after he had been her father's personal secretary for two years in Bombay, and gave birth to the poet Mary Frere. Their son John married Aileen Spring Rice, the granddaughter of Lord Monteagle of Brandon.

== Honduras ==
In 1814 he was appointed lieutenant governor of British Honduras, holding at the same time the rank of colonel on the staff, thus exercising the military command as well as the civil government.

Arthur fell out with Honduran landowners over the local system of democratically elected magistrates. Pointing out its iniquity, he reported cases of maltreatment of women in slavery that went unpunished. In an 1823 Commons debate, abolitionists cited Arthur's 1816 letters describing the maltreatment. However, Arthur had also stated in an 1816 article that, apart from those few cases he had reported, in no part of the world had he seen "the labouring class of people possess anything like the comforts and advantages of the Slave population of Honduras". Despite opponents mocking Arthur's contradictory position, William Wilberforce's resolution prevailed and flogging of women in slavery was banned. With this collaboration and success came Wilberforce's patronage which was key to Arthur's next promotion.

== Van Diemen's Land ==
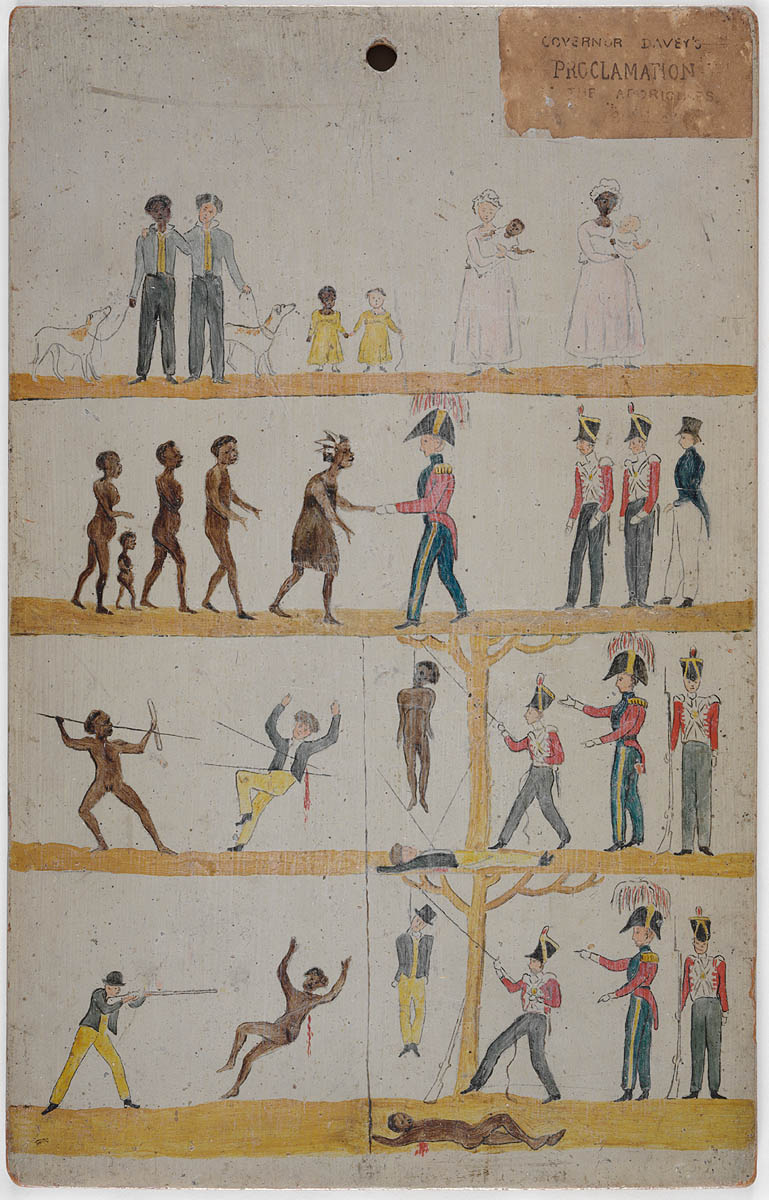
Proclamation board incorrectly labelled "Governor Davey's Proclamation, 1816", depicting Governor Arthur's proclamation c. 1830

In 1823 he was appointed lieutenant governor of Van Diemen's Land (later known as Tasmania). He arrived on the ship Adrian with his wife and family on 12 May 1824 and took office on 14 May. At the time Van Diemen's Land was the main British penal colony and it was separated from New South Wales in 1825. It was during Arthur's time in office that Van Diemen's Land gained much of its notorious reputation as a harsh penal colony. He selected Port Arthur as the ideal location for a prison settlement, on a peninsula connected by a narrow, easily guarded isthmus, surrounded by shark-infested seas. Arthur's predecessors had executed no one in Tasmania as capital punishment was carried out in Sydney. George Arthur executed 260 people in his term of office (some bodies were left hanging for months).

As lieutenant governor, George Arthur is responsible for the repression and persecution of the Aboriginal population in the conflict known as the Black War. Throughout the 1820s Arthur had instituted various measures to protect settlers from Aboriginal attacks, including the stationing of garrison troops in remote farmhouses and the dispatch of combined military and police teams into the wilderness to track Indigenous bands. These proved ineffective, and by 1830 the conflict between Aborigines and settlers had increased.

Arthur's initial brief had stated, "when such disturbances cannot be prevented or allayed by less vigorous measures, to oppose force by force, and to repel such Aggressions in the same manner, as if they proceeded from subjects of any accredited State." However, on 17 April 1828 in an official dispatch, Arthur described Aboriginal combatants as "Savages", a nomenclature that placed them outside the conventions of European warfare.

In February 1830 Arthur sought public input on alternative measures to end the fighting; suggestions included a system of rewards for captured Aborigines, and the importation of packs of hunting dogs to "set [on] the natives as they would a quail." Arthur himself expressed regret that a treaty was not signed with Aborigines when the colony was established. In its absence, and given the increasing attacks on both sides, on 27 August 1830 Arthur obtained Executive Council approval for a declaration of martial law.

The centrepiece of Arthur's military efforts would be the Black Line fiasco, which was intended to drive the Aborigines from the colony's grazing land onto isolated peninsulas where they could be controlled. At the beginning of the Black War in 1826 Arthur issued an official statement setting out those situations that would justify settlers using violence: 'If it should be apparent that there is a determination on the part of one or more of the native tribes to attack, rob, or murder the white inhabitants generally, any person may arm, and joining themselves to the military, drive them by force to a safe distance, treating them as open enemies.

In 1833, Arthur wrote to his line superior, Secretary of State for War and the Colonies Viscount Goderich, "I am willing to make almost any prudent sacrifice that may tend to compensate for the injuries that the government is unwillingly and unavoidably made the instrument of inflicting." However, Arthur was a fastidious administrator who once wrote to his son "As to chance and good luck I know of nothing more absurd". "All happens under the direction of providence of the Almighty who works by human agency". To the first Aboriginal Establishment (internment camp) on Bruny Island, Arthur initially sent used blankets without any instruction to laund them and a syphilitic assistant overseer. When mortality there skyrocketed, Arthur became concerned. However, his concern appears to have been for the perception of his Abolitionist patrons and the home government regarding deaths of women and children in custody rather than for the tragedy of the Aboriginal Tasmanians' lives lost. Arthur obfuscated the mortality and distanced himself by setting up a committee. At the Aboriginal Establishment's subsequent locations, the litany of pernicious mortality-driving failings continued while Arthur, the Committee and the overseers ignore the everyday prophylactic protocols implemented on convict transports, in prisons and barracks. The failings are in every aspect remarkably reminiscent of the contagion-driving factors documented in an 1811 Parliamentary Paper on the 1809 Walcheren Debacle that Arthur most probably read. A split command hobbled the expeditionary force which became figuratively and literally bogged down. Lacking necessary supplies, accommodation and medical care, mortality due to contagion rose to 10%. Arthur served and fell ill at Walcheren. After the evacuation, he become Aide-de-camp and close friend to General George Don who had initially reconnoitered Walcheren and was then brought in to organize the evacuation. The Parliamentary Paper cited around 50 of Don's dispatches. At its various subsequent locations, the Aboriginal Establishment's mortality rate averaged just over 10%, while every other institution under Arthur was a paragon of well-managed efficiency with mortality rates below England's average of 1.9%.

A Sydney Monitor editorial on his recall stated, "[Arthur] gave plausible replies, while he smiled in secret, knowing that those smiles would be communicated to his satraps and underlings, and that they would increase rather than mitigate this undercurrent of tyranny against the opposers of his government." The improbable level of failures and this description of his character point to Arthur obfuscating an orchestrated diminution which is consistent with a caution Arthur had received from Goderich's predecessor, Sir George Murray, in 1830. Murray – an expert in military intelligence analysis who had served as a lieutenant-governor – wrote, "the adoption of any line of conduct, having for its avowed, or for its secret object, the extinction of the Native race, could not fail to leave an indelible stain upon the character of the British Government."

Arthur failed in his attempts to reform the colony and the system of penal transportation with Arthur's autocratic and authoritarian rule leading to his recall in January 1836. By this time he was one of the wealthiest men in the colony, having totaled £50,000 (in 1839 value) by selling nearly all his landed property. He departed Hobart for England on 30 October 1836, boarding the Elphinstone in tears, acclaimed by hundreds of cheering colonists.

== Canada ==
In 1837 Arthur was knighted as a Knight Commander of the Royal Guelphic Order (KCH), given the rank of Major General on the staff. In December 1837 he was appointed lieutenant governor of Upper Canada and took office in Toronto from 23 March 1838. From the very start of his administration, he had to deal with the aftermath of the Upper Canada Rebellion and was instrumental in the execution of Peter Matthews (rebel) and Samuel Lount. In the same year, Upper Canada was invaded by a band of American sympathizers, one of a series of attempts to subvert British authority in Upper and Lower Canada. He failed to address the issues of fixing colonial administration from the influence of Family Compact, and was replaced by Lord Durham while the 13th Parliament of Upper Canada sat betimes.

The two colonies were united in 1841. The Lord Sydenham, the first governor-general, asked Sir George Arthur to administer Upper Canada as deputy governor. Arthur agreed, on condition that the service was unpaid. Later in 1841 he returned to England and was created a hereditary baronet in recognition of his services in Canada.

== India ==
On 8 June 1842, Arthur was appointed governor of the Indian presidency of Bombay, which he retained until 1846. He displayed great tact in the office, as well as ability, and this helped in extending and strengthening British rule in India.

Arthur was appointed provisional governor-general, but did not assume office, as he was compelled by ill health to leave India before Lord Hardinge vacated the governor-generalship.

Sir George Arthur, during his administration of the affairs of the presidency, perfected the Deccan survey, the object of which was to equalise and decrease the pressure of the land assessment on the cultivators of the Deccan; and gave his hearty support to the project of a railway line from Bombay to Cailian, which may be regarded as the germ of the Great Indian Peninsular Railway, while during his administration the reclamation of the foreshore of the island of Bombay was projected. During his tenure, he inaugurated the famous 'Grant Medical College' in Bombay (1845 AD) one of the first three Medical Colleges in India teaching the western medical sciences. The other two being, the Medical College, Bengal (1835 AD) and Madras Medical College (Formerly Madras Medical School in 1835 and later, Madras Medical College in 1850 AD). The hospital for the Grant Medical College, the Jamshedji Jijiboy Hospital was constructed by the Parsee Trust beforehand.

== Final years ==
On his return to England in 1846, he was made a privy councillor, and in 1853 he received the colonelcy of the 50th (Queen's Own) Regiment of Foot. He was promoted to lieutenant-general in 1854 and died that September.

== Legacy ==
Famous Arthur Road Jail in Mumbai is named after Arthur Road which was named after Sir George Arthur, Governor of Bombay

Arthur's time in Tasmania was dramatised in the 1945 radio play Conflict in Van Diemen's Land.

Coat of arms of Sir George Arthur, 1st Baronet
Crest In front of two swords in saltire Proper pommels and hilts Or a pelican in her piety Sable the nest Or. Escutcheon Or on a chevron Azure between two clarions in chief Gules and a kangaroo sejant in base Proper two swords the points upwards also Proper points and hilts of the first on a chief of the third a horse courant Argent. Motto Stet Fortuna Domus (May The Fortune of the House Stand)

== See also ==
- 1828 Proclamation of Demarcation
- Lieutenant Governor of Ontario
- Governor of Bombay
- Lieutenant Governor of Van Diemen's Land

== Sources ==
- Serle, Percival (1949). "Arthur, George". Dictionary of Australian Biography. Sydney: Angus & Robertson.

Government offices
Preceded by John Nugent Smyth	Superintendent of British Honduras; 1814–1822	Succeeded by A. H. Pye
Preceded by Colonel William Sorell	Lieutenant Governor of Van Diemen's Land; 1824–1836	Succeeded by Captain Sir John Franklin
Preceded by Sir Francis Bond Head	Lieutenant Governor of Upper Canada; 1838–1839	Succeeded by The Lord Sydenham
Preceded by James Rivett-Carnac	Governor of Bombay; 1842–1846	Succeeded by Lestock Robert Reid
Baronetage of the United Kingdom
New creation	Baronet (of Upper Canada); 1841–1854	Succeeded by Frederick Arthur
Academic offices
Preceded by Sir Francis Bond Head	Chancellor of King's College; 1838–1841	Succeeded by The Lord Sydenham
