= Richard Arthur (bishop) =

Irish Catholic Bishop

Styles of Richard Arthur
- Reference style: The Most Reverend
- Spoken style: My Lord
- Religious style: Bishop

Richard Arthur c. 1560–4 May 1646) was an Irish Roman Catholic prelate who was Bishop of Limerick from 1623 to 1646.

== Biography ==
Arthur was born into a wealthy merchant family in Cork around 1560. In his youth he went into service of the state in Dublin and later in Cork. He assisted Richard Boyle, 1st Earl of Cork. He left public service after the death of his eldest brother and managed the family business. This took him to England on many occasions where he witnessed the martyrdom of several English Catholic priests. Their example inspired him to enter seminary. He studied in Leuven and Dowaai and was ordained for the diocese of Limerick around 1598. He was not related to Bishop Thomas Arthur of Limerick 1468–1486.

This was a particularly dangerous time for priests in Ireland and many were hunted by Puritans. Arthur was known for taking over the ancient mensal parishes of St Mary's and St John's for Catholic worship. During this period he kept on the move and was known to move about in disguise and offer Mass and preach secretly throughout the west, south and southeast of Ireland as far as Galway, Cork and Kilkenny.

In 1620 after a period as Vicar General Arthur was appointed bishop and he received consecration in 1623 where the principle consecrator was bishop Rothe of Ossory. Arthur was already 63 when consecrated and was never in great health. After being bishop for seven years he asked Rome for a coadjutor. An assistant was not forthcoming though so he had to labour on in difficult circumstances. In the final years of his life Limerick was besieged twice during the Confederate period. Despite the difficulties the Confederate period was one when Catholics could function open and freely so Arthur was able to welcome Capuchins and Jesuits to Limerick. During this period the Papal Legate Archbishop Rinuccini was able to visit Limerick and assess the situation. Rinuccini was in Limerick in 1646 when Arthur died and he describes his death in his memoirs, the Commentarius Rimiccinianus.
