= Arthur baronets =

Baronetcy in the Baronetage of the United Kingdom

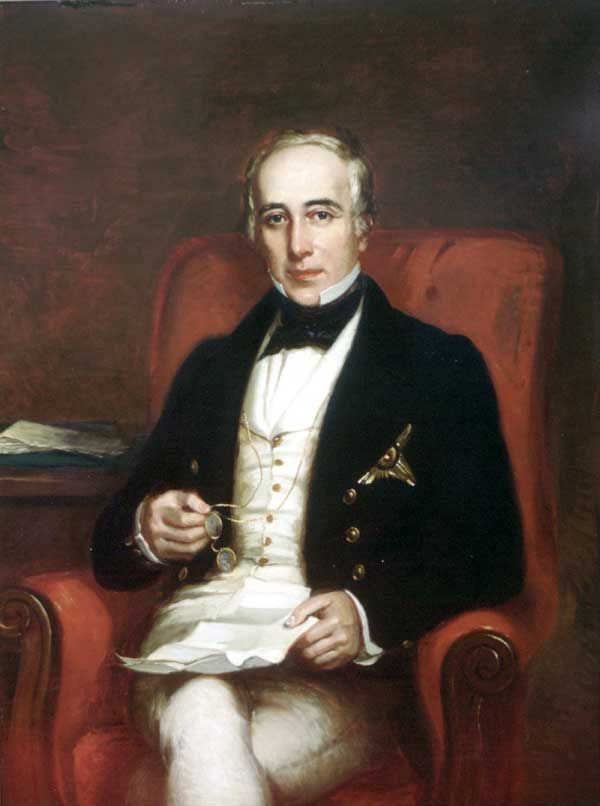
Sir George Arthur, 1st Baronet

There have been two baronetcies created for persons with the surname Arthur, both in the Baronetage of the United Kingdom. As of 2014 both creations are extant.

The Arthur baronetcy, of Upper Canada, was created in the UK baronetage on 5 June 1841 for the military commander and colonial administrator Sir George Arthur; the fifth baronet of this creation was Speaker of the New Zealand House of Representatives between 1984 and 1985, and as of December 2015, the present rightful holder, who lives in Australia, is yet to formally prove his succession to the baronetcy and is therefore not on the Official Roll of the Baronetage. However, the case is under review by the Registrar of the Baronetage.

The Arthur baronetcy, of Carlung in the County of Ayr, was created in the baronetage of the United Kingdom on 10 January 1903. For more information on this creation, see Baron Glenarthur.

== Arthur baronets, of Upper Canada (1841) ==
Arthur baronets
- Crest: In front of two swords in saltire Proper pommels and hilts Or a pelican in her piety Sable the nest Or.
- Shield: Or on a chevron Azure between two clarions in chief Gules and a kangaroo sejant in base Proper two swords the points upwards also Proper points and hilts of the first on a chief of the third a horse courant Argent.
- Motto: Stet Fortuna Domus (May The Fortune of the House Stand)

- Sir George Arthur, 1st Baronet, KCH (1784–1854)
- Sir Frederick Leopold Arthur, 2nd Baronet (1816–1878)
- Sir George Compton Archibald Arthur, 3rd Baronet, MVO (1860–1946)
- Sir George Malcolm Arthur, 4th Baronet (1908–1949)
- Sir Basil Malcolm Arthur, 5th Baronet, MP (1928–1985)
- Sir Stephen John Arthur, 6th Baronet (1953–2010)
- Sir Benjamin Nathan Arthur, 7th Baronet (born 1979)

Until his death, the heir presumptive to the title was the present holder's second cousin twice-removed Sir Gavyn Farr Arthur (1951–2016), a judge and former Lord Mayor of London. The current heir presumptive is Robert Arthur (born 1955), son of Dr Leonard Arthur.

=== Line of succession ===
- Lt.-Gen. Rt. Hon. Sir George Arthur of Upper Canada, 1st Baronet (1784–1854)
  - Colonel Edward Penfold Arthur (1825–1870)
    - George Arthur Arthur (1851–1878)
      - Edward Malcolm Arthur (1874–1928)
        - Sir George Malcolm Arthur, 4th Baronet (1908–1949)
          - The Hon. Sir Basil Malcolm Arthur, 5th Baronet (1928–1985) Speaker of the New Zealand House of Representatives.
            - Sir Stephen John Arthur, 6th Baronet (1953–2010)
              - Sir Benjamin Nathan Arthur, 7th Baronet (born 1979)
      - George Frederick Neale Arthur (1878–1939)
        - Major George Leonard Arthur (1908–1997)
          - Sir Gavyn Arthur (1951–2016) 675th Lord Mayor of London
  - John Raynor Arthur (1830–1903)
    - Sigismund Raynor Arthur (1867–1920)
      - Reverend John Sigismund Arthur (1894–1974)
        - Leonard John Henry Arthur (1926–1983)
          - (1) Robert Leonard Sigismund Arthur (b. 1955)
            - (2) Jamie Lawrence Arthur (b. 1999)
            - (3) William Merlin Arthur (b. 2002)
            - (4) Alfred Alexander Arthur (b. 2004)
            - (5) Thomas Charles Georg (b. 2006)
      - Sir Oswald Raynor Arthur (1905–1973)
        - Thomas Sigismund Raynor Arthur (1940–2012)
          - (6) George Raynor MacLeod Arthur (b. 1969)
    - Major Edmund John Arthur (1873–1953)
      - (7) George Henry Edmond Arthur (b. 1927)
        - (8) Robert George Arthur (b. 1950)
          - (9) Neil Robert Arthur (b. 1970)
          - (10) Kieron Gerald Arthur (b. 1970)

== Arthur baronets, of Carlung (1903) ==
- see Baron Glenarthur
