= William Hemple Arthur =

United States Army general

- Born: April 1, 1856
- Died: April 19, 1936 (aged 80)
- Military career
- Service years: 1881–1917
- Rank: Brigadier general

William Hemple Arthur (April 1, 1856 – April 19, 1936) was a physician, army officer, and later an American Brigadier general active during World War I.

== Early life ==
Arthur was born in Philadelphia, Pennsylvania. He received an M.D. from the University of Maryland in 1877.

== Career ==
In 1881, Arthur was appointed assistant surgeon in the United States Army.

On February 18, 1886 Arthur was promoted to captain-assistant surgeon.

From 1899 to 1900, he commanded a hospital ship during the Spanish–American War. He was with the China Relief Expedition of 1900, then was in the Philippines from 1900 to 1902. He also served assignments in Soldiers Home and Walter Reed Army Medical Center in Washington D.C. until 1915.

In October 1915, Arthur became the third commandant of the Army Medical Department Research and Graduate School until his retirement on December 3, 1918. Arthur was promoted to brigadier general of the National Army with the date of rank from August 7, 1917.

After his retirement, he became the medical director of Georgetown University Hospital.

== Death and legacy ==
William Hemple Arthur died at the age of eighty on April 19, 1936.

== Bibliography ==
- Davis, Henry Blaine Jr. Generals in Khaki. Raleigh, NC: Pentland Press, 1998. ISBN 1-57197-088-6 OCLC 231779136
- Marquis Who's Who, Inc. Who Was Who in American History, the Military. Chicago: Marquis Who's Who, 1975. ISBN 0-8379-3201-7 OCLC 657162692
- Who's Who in the Nation's Capital. 1922. Washington, D.C.: Consolidated Pub. Co. OCLC 4660484
