= John Arthur (cricketer) =

Australian cricketer (1847–1877)

Personal information
- Full name: John Lake Allen Arthur
- Born: 7 April 1847; Longford, Van Diemen's Land
- Died: 26 April 1877 (aged 30); Longford, Tasmania
- Batting: Right-handed
- Bowling: Right-arm roundarm
- Role: All rounder

Domestic team information
- Years: Team
- 1868/69–1872/73: Tasmania

Career statistics
Competition	First-class
Matches	4
Runs scored	135
Batting average	19.28
100s/50s	0/0
Top score	43
Balls bowled	148
Wickets	4
Bowling average	25.00
5 wickets in innings	0
10 wickets in match	0
Best bowling	4/100
Catches/stumpings	0/1
- Source: CricInfo, 1 December 2008

John Lake Allen Arthur (7 April 1847 – 26 April 1877) was a first-class cricketer who played for Tasmania from 1866 to 1875.

Arthur was born in Longford, Tasmania, the son of Charles Arthur. One of his uncles was Thomas Reibey, Premier of Tasmania in the 1870s. He was educated at Launceston Grammar School and at The Hutchins School in Hobart.

An opening batsman and a roundarm bowler, which was the more common form of bowling at the time, Arthur represented Tasmania in three first-class matches, and a single game for a Rest of Australia side in 1872/73. Despite not normally playing as a wicket-keeper, he effected one stumping keeping wicket against Victoria in his first first-class match. In 1868–69, also against Victoria, he captained the Tasmanian side, top-scoring with 43 in the second innings after Tasmania were bowled out for 18 in the first innings.

Arthur was invited to take part in the Australians' 1878 tour of England, but two days after receiving the letter of invitation he died at home in Longford on 26 April 1877, aged 30 years and 19 days. He had been ill for a short time and succumbed to pleurisy.
