= Thomas Ferrier Hamilton =

Australian politician, pastoralist, and sportsman (1820–1905)

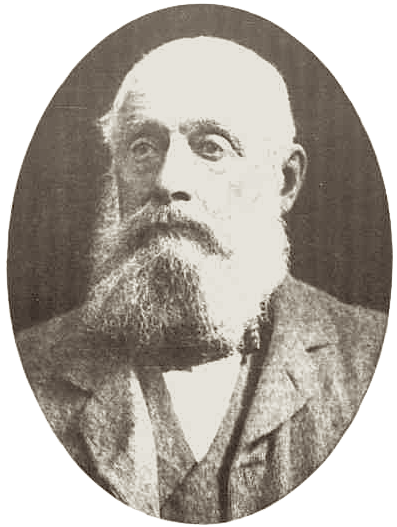

Member of the Victorian Legislative Council for Southern Province
- In office April 1872 – August 1884
- Preceded by: William Henry Pettett
- Succeeded by: Thomas Henty

Personal details
- Born: 31 March 1820 Cathlaw House, Torphichen, Linlithgowshire, Scotland
- Died: 7 August 1905 (aged 85) St Kilda, Victoria, Australia

Thomas Ferrier Hamilton (born 31 March 1820 – 7 August 1905) was an Australian politician, pastoralist, and sportsman. A grandson of the 2nd Viscount Gort, he was born in Linlithgowshire, Scotland, but emigrated to Australia in 1839. Hamilton and his cousin, John Carre Riddell, owned a pastoral lease near Gisborne, Victoria. A local magistrate and justice of the peace, he was elected to the Victorian Legislative Council in 1872, sitting as a member for the Southern Province until 1884. He also sat on the Gisborne Road Board, including as chairman for a time. A member (and twice president) of the Melbourne Cricket Club, Hamilton was a keen cricketer, and played several matches for Victorian representative teams, including the inaugural first-class match in Australia.

== Family and early life ==
Hamilton was born at Cathlaw House, in Torphichen, Linlithgowshire, Scotland, on 31 March 1820. His father was Col. John Ferrier Hamilton, of the 3rd (Prince of Wales's) Dragoon Guards, and his mother was The Hon. Georgina Prendergast Vereker, the third daughter of Charles Vereker, 2nd Viscount Gort. The couple's first son was Major Walter Ferrier Hamilton, who inherited his father's properties and was the member for the Linlithgowshire constituency in the Parliament of the United Kingdom from 1859 to 1865.

Educated at the Edinburgh Academy, Hamilton emigrated to Australia after turning 18, with his cousin, John Carre Riddell. The pair arrived at Port Jackson aboard the Abberton, on 23 August 1839, and, after two weeks in Sydney, began the three-week overland trip to the Port Phillip District (present-day Victoria). Upon arrival in the district, Hamilton and Riddell were initially in partnership with Niel Black, purchasing and stocking Strathdownie, in the Western District. In May 1840, they purchased the late Henry Howey's station near Mount Macedon, with the pair's ownership of what they named Cairn Hill (after a family property in Scotland, Cairnhill) lasting until 1861. Records show that the run, between Mount Macedon and Gisborne, comprised approximately 25,000 acres, and, in 1853, included 7,000 sheep (and 12 horses). Turitable, another property owned by the pair in the Western District, comprised around 12,000 acres, with 1,500 sheep and 300 cattle.

Hamilton and Riddell's partnership was dissolved in 1861, with Hamilton subsequently acquiring Elderslie, a 1,536-acre property near New Gisborne. In 1851, Hamilton had married Elizabeth Mary Milner Stephen, whose father, Sidney Stephen, and grandfather, John Stephen, were both judges descended from James Stephen, the notable abolitionist. The couple had eleven children, including Blanche Muriel Eugénie (later Ross-Watt), a charity worker and, like her father, a president of the Shire of Gisborne, possibly the first woman to head a local government body in Victoria. His youngest daughter was Constance Ferrier Hamilton, who married Robert Officer Blackwood. During world war I, she assisted Helen Sexton establish a hospital in France. Constance and Sexton received a Medal of French Gratitude in 1919.

== Sporting career ==
Thomas Ferrier Hamilton
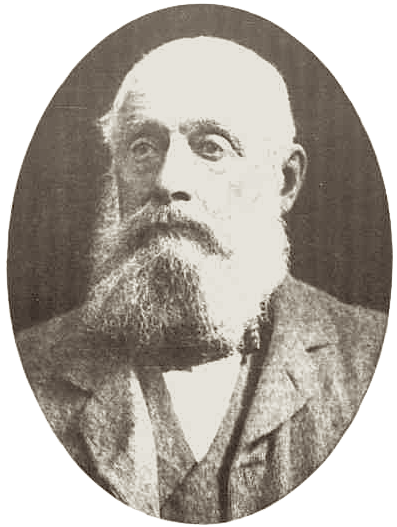

Cricket information
- Batting: Right-handed
- Bowling: Right-arm fast (under-arm)
- Role: All-rounder

Domestic team information
- Years: Team
- 1850/51–1857/58: Victoria
- FC debut: 11 February 1851 Victoria v Tasmania
- Last FC: 11 February 1858 Victoria v New South Wales

Career statistics
Competition	First-class
Matches	3
Runs scored	132
Batting average	26.40
100s/50s	0/0
Top score	42
Balls bowled	148
Wickets	11
Bowling average	7.27
5 wickets in innings	1
10 wickets in match	0
Best bowling	5/27
Catches/stumpings	2/–
- Source: CricketArchive, 26 March 2014

Hamilton was an original member of the Melbourne Cricket Club (MCC), which had been established in 1838. In February 1851, the club played an intercolonial match against the Launceston Cricket Club at the Launceston Cricket Ground, in what was retrospectively recognised as a match between Victoria and Tasmanian representative sides, and the inaugural first-class match in Australia (and indeed the first match of that status outside England). A right-handed all-rounder, Hamilton came in third (behind Duncan Cooper and Victoria's captain, William Philpott) in the first innings of the match, before being bowled by another Scottish immigrant, Robert McDowall, for 10 runs. He took 3/24 in Tasmania's first innings of 104 all out, ably partnered by Thomas Antill, who took 7/33. In Victoria's second innings, he opened the batting with a fellow Scotsman, James Brodie, and scored 35 out of the team's 57 runs, the only batsman to pass double figures. Tasmania went on to win the match by three wickets, despite falling to 6/15 in its second innings chasing 36 runs for victory.

A return fixture was organised for March the following year, at the Emerald Hill ground in Melbourne. Hamilton was both the MCC's leading run-scorer and leading wicket-taker in the match, which resulted in Victoria winning by 61 runs. He scored 42 runs in each innings, and took eight wickets for the match, including a five-wicket haul, 5/27, in the second innings. Hamilton returned to England for a short period in 1853, and arranged to have enough cricket equipment "to last for the next two ensuing seasons" sent back to Melbourne. His third and final first-class match came against New South Wales in January 1858, only the second first-class match played at the Melbourne Cricket Ground. Aged 36, he played a much lesser role than in the previous matches, scoring three runs overall and running out George Gilbert, although Victoria, captained by Tom Wills, won convincingly, by 171 runs.

Hamilton served as president of the MCC from 1859 to 1868, and was responsible for inviting an English team, led by H. H. Stephenson, to tour Australia during the 1861–62 season, which was both the first tour of Australia by an overseas team and the first English team to tour overseas. Now aged 40, he did appear one final time for a Victorian XXII against an English XI, and was one of only four players to pass double figures in the team's first innings. The match did not have first-class status, however, due to the uneven nature of the teams. An observer had described his batting style as "impenetrable" following an MCC game against Richmond the previous season. Hamilton maintained an interest in local cricket for many years, and an obituary noted he had been a member of the MCC for over 60 years at the time of his death.

== Politics and later life ==
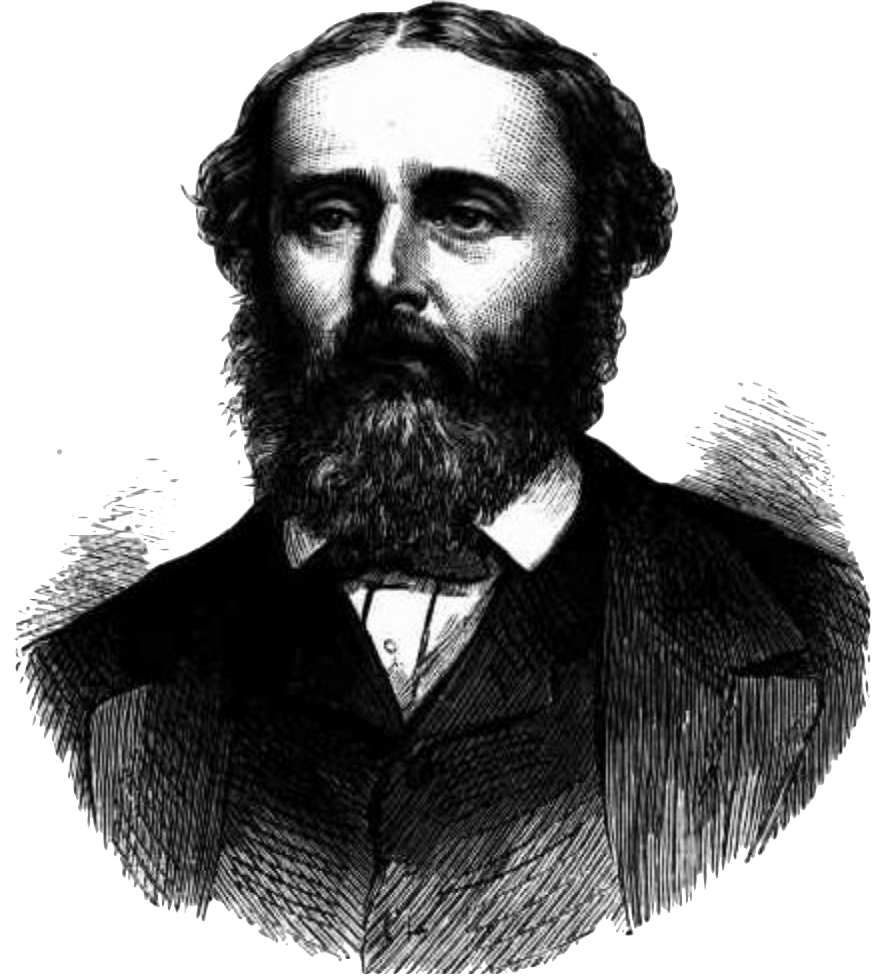
Hamilton, as pictured in The Illustrated Australian News in 1873.

Following the death of William Pettett in late 1871, Hamilton successfully contested a by-election for the Southern Province constituency in the Legislative Council, the colony's upper house. The election was also to be contested by James Forester Sullivan, the MLA for Mandurang (and later for Collingwood). Hamilton received an endorsement from the Melbourne-based Telegraph, who noted that, although he was "untried" in public life, he may "turn out to be a legislative gem of the purest water", unlike Sullivan, who was a "pretentious hollow sham". However, Sullivan failed to return his nomination paper by the deadline, and Hamilton was returned unopposed. Although there were no formal political groupings in Victoria at the time, Hamilton maintained he was "entirely independent of party". Upon his swearing in at the opening of parliament in April 1872, he sat on the opposition benches.
