= Van Diemen's Land v Port Phillip, 1851 =

1851 cricket match in Australia

On 11 and 12 February 1851, teams from Van Diemen's Land (now Tasmania) and Port Phillip District (now Victoria) played the first cricket match between two Australian colonies, recognised in later years as the inaugural first-class cricket match in Australia. It took place at the Launceston Racecourse, known now as the NTCA Ground, in Tasmania. The match was incorporated into celebrations marking the separation of the Port Phillip District from New South Wales in 1851 as the colony of Victoria.

The team representing Port Phillip, generally named "Victoria" in the press, was drawn from the Melbourne Cricket Club. The Van Diemen's Land team, designated "Tasmania" in newspapers, consisted of players from both Launceston and Hobart. The visiting team was expected to have an advantage through the use of fast overarm bowling. Cricket in Victoria was considerably more advanced than in Tasmania, whose bowlers operated underarm. The match, intended to be played to a finish with no limits on time, took place on a pitch that made batting difficult. As was usual practice at the time, overs comprised four deliveries and there was no set boundary.

John Marshall was the captain of the Van Diemen's Land team and William Philpott led the Port Phillip team, which batted first. The Victorian team found the home bowling difficult to face, on account of its unusually slow pace; in their first innings, they scored 82. Van Diemen's Land replied with 104, assisted by a large number of extras. The batsmen coped better than expected with the overarm bowling, although Thomas Antill took three wickets in four balls in returning figures of seven wickets for 33 runs. Batting again, the Victorian team scored 57, leaving the Tasmanian team needing 36 to win. When the first day's play ended due to bad light, Van Diemen's Land had scored 15 runs and lost six wickets. The next morning, the home team scored the required runs for the loss of one more wicket, recording a three-wicket victory. (Note: Winning by three wickets means that the team batting last had three wickets left to fall when they passed their opponent's match aggregate of runs.) The match, which had been keenly anticipated, was a great attraction and was followed closely in the press in Melbourne. Additionally, there were many social events for the visiting team.

Following this match, intercolonial cricket became increasingly widespread; cricket in Australia became more popular and was given a boost when teams of English cricketers began to tour the country, leading to a rapid increase in the playing skill of Australian cricketers.

== Background ==
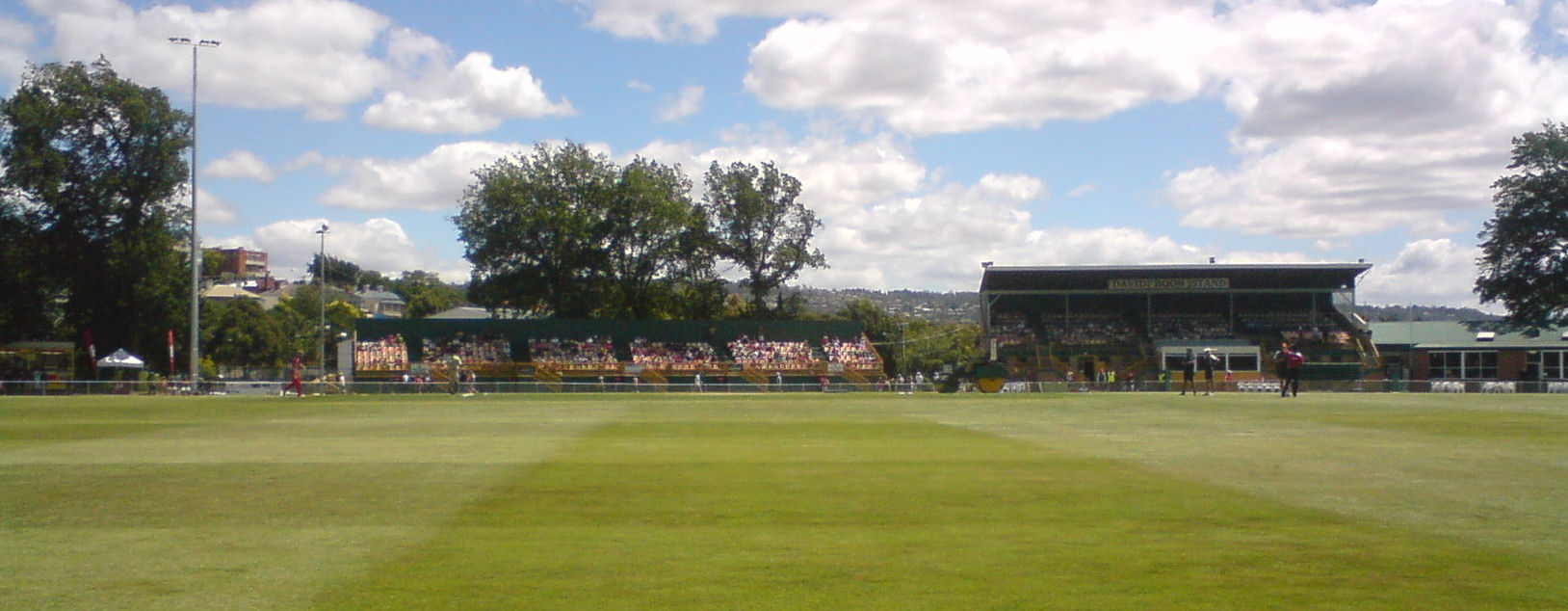
The NTCA Ground, previously known as the Launceston Racecourse, where the match took place

It is uncertain precisely when and how cricket began to be played in Australia. It may have arrived along with the First Fleet from England but no records document this. Nevertheless, the game grew relatively quickly. The first recorded match in Australia took place in Sydney in 1803 between the military and civilians; according to the journalists Jim Kilburn and Mike Coward, in a review of Australian cricket, the New South Wales governor ordered that equipment for the game should be made in government workshops. Similar early games between the military and civilians took place in Tasmania and Victoria. The vast distances between the colonies initially prevented intercolonial cricket, but clubs quickly came into existence in the population centres and an element of competition soon arose. A combination of the presence of the British military, the attraction of English pastimes that did not require sophisticated venues or practices, and a desire to develop a society similar to that of Britain made cricket an attractive outlet for Australians. By 1832, the Sydney Gazette was able to state that "cricket was now the prevailing amusement of the colony and that no gentleman could expect to 'dangle at a lady's apron strings' unless he could boast of his cricket prowess." Matches began to be covered by newspapers, and the sport's popularity spread with the population.

One of the most prestigious clubs in Australia was the Melbourne Cricket Club (MCC), which was formed in 1838, only three years after the founding of Melbourne. The MCC dominated cricket in Australia for the rest of the century. Although club membership was intended for the social elite, similar to that of leading English clubs at the time, its ability to secure the best cricketers in its teams made it enormously popular with spectators; the intention of the MCC seems to have been to spread cricket's popularity in a similar way to the Marylebone Cricket Club's efforts in England.

Cricket was less well-established in Tasmania, then known as Van Diemen's Land. Although cricket was probably played soon after the island was settled in 1803, and was reasonably popular by the mid-1810s, the first recorded matches took place only in 1825. There was little organisation or competition; there were few clubs, and none in Hobart, in the south of Tasmania, until 1832, or in Launceston, in the north, until 1841. Partly, this may have been due to an insistence among Tasmanian clubs that only the social elite could play cricket. The cricket historian Jack Pollard suggests that Tasmanian cricket failed to thrive in its early years because of "the strange reluctance of the strong, prestigious clubs in Hobart and Launceston to hire professional players to coach and strengthen their teams". With these main cities 200 kilometres (120 mi) apart, it was difficult to establish competitive games; despite an abandoned attempt in 1841, the first match between North and South Tasmania did not take place until 1850. These difficulties prompted Launceston cricketers to seek opponents from the Australian mainland rather than from Hobart.

== Build-up ==
On 12 January 1850, William Philpott—who was born in England and emigrated to Australia in 1844 before establishing himself as a leading figure at the MCC—proposed at a special MCC meeting that a cricketing challenge be sent to Launceston for a match between teams representing Port Phillip and Van Diemen's Land. (Note: Melbourne's association with Launceston can be traced back to 1834, when a group of settlers from Launceston founded the first European settlement on the site of Melbourne.)

An invitation was sent to the Launceston Cricket Club in February with a view to playing that March. The invitation was accepted but the match was delayed when the acceptance letter was not posted in time to reach the steamer transporting mail. (Note: The Melbourne team was expected to arrive in Launceston on the steamer Shamrock in April 1850. A delegation from the Launceston cricket club went to meet the players at the wharf; a small group even took a boat to meet the steamer before it docked. Both the delegation and the general public were disappointed to find that no cricket team was on board; subsequently, a match against a local club was arranged.) The MCC repeated their invitation later in 1850. While the match was being arranged, legislation passed in the United Kingdom to separate the Port Phillip District, which was to be renamed as Victoria, from the colony of New South Wales. When news of this much anticipated decision reached the colony late in 1850, two weeks of celebrations were arranged in Melbourne to mark independence. The delayed cricket match, now scheduled for February 1851, became part of the general festivities, although formal independence did not come about until later in 1851. Furthermore, the fixture was to be the first Australian intercolonial match and was later considered the first first-class cricket match in Australia.

The Melbourne Club decided that the team should wear red, white and blue colours on their clothing for the game. Although they had a long time to prepare, the MCC had some difficulty in assembling enough men to represent Port Phillip; many potential players were unable to spare the time to travel to Van Diemen's Land. Even as the team prepared to depart, only ten people had been found, and the eleventh, Duncan Cooper, only joined as they left on the steamer Shamrock. The eleven Victorian players, accompanied by many acquaintances, both men and women, arrived in Launceston on 9 February. On the evening of their arrival, they attended a dinner at the Cornwall Hotel with 100 paying guests. The following day, the team won a match against Bishopthorpe College. There was little time to practise before the intercolonial game.

The Port Phillip team were favourites before the game began. This was partly owing to their bowlers' use of overarm bowling at pace; by contrast, bowlers in Tasmania preferred underarm bowling at a time when roundarm bowling was permitted in the rest of the world. (Note: Even in 1863, Tasmania did not allow roundarm bowling; one bowler, Thomas Hogg, was no-balled for raising his arm above the shoulder during his delivery. In the same year, overarm bowling was legalised in England.) The match was played at the Launceston Racecourse ground, but the state of the ground was such that the umpires were unsure of the best place to pitch the wickets. The Victorian team were dismayed by the state of the pitch, which looked extremely difficult to bat on, and later received an apology from the government of Tasmania.

The team for Van Diemen's Land was drawn from across the island: three players came from Hobart, five from Launceston and three players from other individual clubs.

== Match proceedings ==
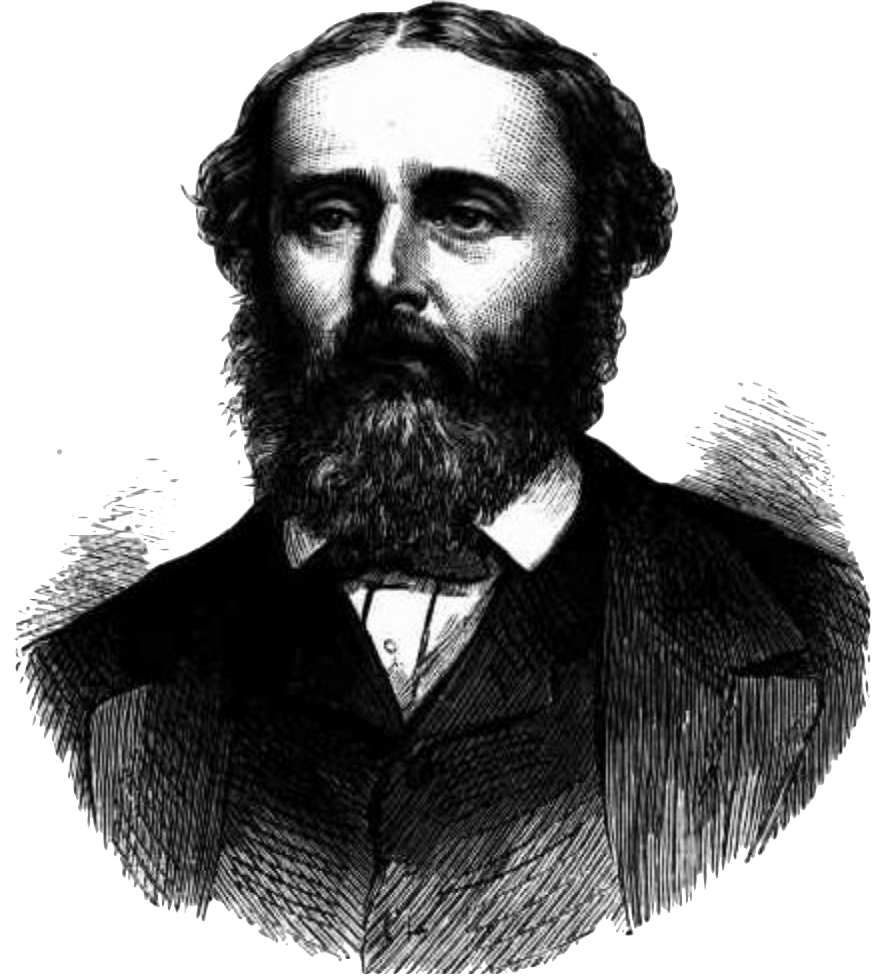
Port Phillip's Thomas Ferrier Hamilton (seen here in 1873), the highest scorer of the match

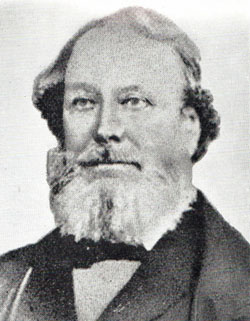
John Marshall, winning captain of Van Diemen's Land team

The match began on 11 February 1851 and was scheduled to be played to a finish irrespective of time. It was well attended, and booths were set up to accommodate spectators. According to Ray Webster in his analysis of all Australian first-class matches, spectators were not charged for admission; the attendance was approximately 1,000 on the first day and 1,500 on the second. In common with all cricket games at the time, each over consisted of four deliveries. Similarly, there were no boundaries to the pitch, so runs could be scored only by running between wickets, and not by hitting a boundary. Although the colonies were officially called Van Diemen's Land and Port Phillip at this point, press reports generally referred to the teams as "Tasmania" and "Victoria". The match was closely followed in Melbourne.

John Marshall captained the Tasmanian team, and William Philpott captained the Victorian team. The toss was won by Marshall, who sent in Victoria to bat. The match started at 11 am.

=== First innings ===
The Tasmanians, bowling first, used their underarm style; the two bowlers, William Henty and Robert McDowall, had an unusually slow pace. The Port Phillip opening batsmen, Duncan Cooper and William Philpott, added 14 runs in 22 minutes before Cooper was bowled. A syndicated Tasmanian press report of the match described Philpott as batting "in fine style" before he was caught at mid-off. Thomas Hamilton and Charles Lister batted steadily before the former was bowled in the first hour, after which the score was 34 runs for the loss of three wickets. (Note: ESPNCricinfo and CricketArchive list the score at the fall of the third wicket as 34. The syndicated newspaper report of the match (as given in the Launceston Examiner) gives the score as 31 for three after an hour's play.) Hamilton was bowled and Lister run out; Alfred Thomson, who scored one run, was soon bowled to leave the score 42 for five. Richard Philpott, the elder brother of Victorian captain William Philpott, made 12 runs to bring the score up to 54, before he too was bowled, and Thomas Antill was dismissed for a duck. James Brodie hit out to score 17 runs, equalling William Philpott as the highest scorer of the innings. He was caught at slip. The last two wickets fell cheaply; Frederick Marsden and Matthew Hervey were both bowled, and Melmoth Hall remained not out on six. The Victorian team scored 82 in 26 four-ball overs in 125 minutes. Henty (four wickets at a cost of 52 runs) and McDowall (five for 27) bowled unchanged throughout the innings.

For Tasmania, Gervase Du Croz and Marshall opened the batting to the fast roundarm bowling of Lister and Hamilton. They batted for an hour—described in the press as displaying "brilliant steady batting"—without being dismissed, at which point, with the score at 25, a lunch break was taken. After the interval, they maintained their partnership for another 30 minutes before Antill, who had replaced Hamilton in the bowling attack, bowled Du Croz; he had scored 27 in 93 minutes and the partnership was worth 40 runs. William Field, who replaced Du Croz, was bowled by the first ball he faced. The new man, George Maddox, scored a single from his first ball; Marshall was then caught at point, having batted 105 minutes for 13 runs. Antill had taken three wickets in four balls. Maddox was bowled by Antill after scoring one, then Hamilton bowled George Gibson for eight. Walter Westbrook, the next man in, survived for forty minutes but struggled to score, only managing three scoring shots in that time before Antill bowled him. Wickets fell steadily: Charles Arthur, bowled by Antill, scored one; John Tabart, bowled by Hamilton, scored two, and Henty was bowled by Antill for a duck. The last batsman, McDowall, batted effectively to score eleven runs before he was caught by Antill at mid-on off Hamilton's bowling. Vincent Giblin remained not out, having batted for a half-hour for seven runs. The Van Diemen's Land innings ended for 104, a lead of 22 over Port Phillip, after 160 minutes and 32 overs. Antill had taken seven wickets for 33 runs while Hamilton took three for 24. Before the match, the Tasmanians had been expected to struggle against the overarm attack of the Victorians, and Antill had performed effectively; yet the Tasmanians were helped by a large total of 24 extras (which included 11 byes and eight no-balls).

=== Second innings ===
Brodie and Hall opened the Port Phillip second innings; they added 12 in ten minutes before Brodie was caught at long off by Tabart and was replaced by Hamilton. Hall was dismissed leg before wicket from the bowling of McDowall shortly afterwards for six. Lister was caught off the bowling of Field for three and Henty bowled Thomas for a duck. William Philpott was run out by Tabart for three and Cooper was bowled by Henty for a duck, the fifth man out with the score on 28. Wickets continued to fall, although Hamilton was batting well at the other end. Richard Philpott, who scored just a single, was caught by Westbrook off Henty; Marsden was bowled by McDowall for two and Hervey bowled by Henty for one. Meanwhile, Hamilton had batted for an hour to score 35 runs, the highest individual score of the match; he was last man out, leg before wicket to McDowall to end the innings for 57 runs. The innings had lasted 17 overs and taken 80 minutes. The other batsmen had contributed 21 runs (one bye was scored) between them. Henty took five for 26 and McDowall returned figures of three for 21. Van Diemen's Land required 36 runs to win.

Although it was getting late, both teams were enthusiastic to finish the match that evening and the home team began their second innings at half past five. Giblin and Du Croz opened the batting to Brodie and Antill. By the time play ended for the day, Van Diemen's Land had lost six wickets for 15 runs. Giblin and Du Croz were bowled by Antill, who then had Westbrook caught by Cooper. Field was caught by Thomson off Brodie, Gibson was bowled by Antill and Marshall caught and bowled by the same bowler. Tabart and Arthur batted until the end of the day, when the umpires called off play due to bad light. The Launceston Examiner stated in its match report: "The excitement was now very great, and neither side confident of victory."

Play resumed at 11 a.m the next day, and Tabart was dropped on his second ball when he mis-hit the ball high into the air. Antill took his fifth wicket of the innings when Hervey caught Arthur without adding to his overnight score. Tabart made several big hits and Van Diemen's Land reached their target without further loss, winning by three wickets. The innings lasted 74 minutes and 13 overs. Antill took six wickets giving away 19 runs, and had match figures of thirteen for 52. The syndicated press report stated that the match was "one of the most exciting contests ever seen", and praised the level of fielding throughout the match. The Tasmanians Marshall, Westbrook and Tabart were specifically praised for their fielding, which drew the crowd's appreciation. The spectators displayed high levels of sportsmanship throughout the match; they did not cheer the fall of Port Phillip wickets or celebrate scoring shots from their own team.

=== Scorecard ===
11−12 February 1851
Scorecard

Port Phillip	v	Van Diemen's Land
82 (26 overs); William Philpott 17; Robert McDowall 5/27 (13 overs)		104 (32 overs); Gervase Du Croz 27; Thomas Antill 7/33 (12 overs)
57 (17 overs); Thomas Hamilton 35; William Henty 5/26 (9 overs)		7/37 (13 overs); John Tabart 15*; Thomas Antill 6/19 (6 overs)

Van Diemen's Land won by 3 wickets
Launceston Racecourse, Launceston
Umpires: C. H. Lyon and C. J. Weedon

- Van Diemen's Land won the toss and elected to field.

==== Port Phillip innings ====
Port Phillip	First innings		Second innings	
Batsman	Method of dismissal	Runs	Method of dismissal	Runs
Duncan Cooper	b McDowall	4	(7) b Henty	0
*William Philpott	c Maddox b McDowall	17	(6) run out (Tabart/Marshall)	3
Thomas Hamilton	b McDowall	10	(1) lbw b McDowall	35
Charles Lister	run out (Marshall)	10	c Maddox b Field	3
Alfred Thomson	b McDowall	1	b Henty	0
Richard Philpott	b Henty	12	(8) c Westbrook b Henty	1
Thomas Antill	st Marshall b Henty	0	(11) not out	0
James Brodie	c Henty b McDowall	17	(2) c Tabart b Henty	5
Frederick Marsden	b Henty	2	b McDowall	2
Melmoth Hall	not out	6	(3) lbw b McDowall	6
Matthew Hervey	b Henty	0	(10) c McDowall b Henty	1
Extras	byes 1; leg byes 2	3	byes 1	1
Total	(26 overs)	82	(17 overs)	57

Van Diemen's Land	First innings				Second innings			
Bowler	Overs	Maidens	Runs	Wickets	Overs	Maidens	Runs	Wickets
William Henty	13	–	52	4	9	–	26	5
Robert McDowall	13	–	27	5	5	–	21	3
William Field	–	–	–	–	3	–	9	1

==== Van Diemen's Land innings ====
Van Diemen's Land	First innings		Second innings	
Batsman	Method of dismissal	Runs	Method of dismissal	Runs
Gervase Du Croz	b Antill	27	(2) b Antill	6
*†John Marshall	c Lister b Antill	13	(7) c & b Antill	0
William Field	b Antill	0	(5) c Thomson b Brodie	1
George Maddox	b Antill	1		
George Gibson	b Hamilton	8	(6) b Antill	1
Walter Westbrook	b Antill	10	(3) c Cooper b Antill	4
Charles Arthur	b Antill	1	(8) c Hervey b Antill	0
John Tabart	b Hamilton	2	(4) not out	15
Vincent Giblin	not out	7	(1) b Antill	1
William Henty	b Antill	0		
Robert McDowall	c Antill b Hamilton	11	(9) not out	4
Extras	byes 11; leg byes 5; no-balls 8	24	byes 3; leg byes 2	5
Total	(32 overs)	104	(13 overs)	37 for 7 wickets

Port Phillip	First innings				Second innings			
Bowler	Overs	Maidens	Runs	Wickets	Overs	Maidens	Runs	Wickets
Charles Lister	12	–	23	0	–	–	–	–
Thomas Hamilton	8	–	24	3	–	–	–	–
Thomas Antill	12	–	33	7	6	–	19	6
James Brodie	–	–	–	–	7	–	13	1

Key

- * – Captain
- † – Wicket-keeper
- c Fielder – Indicates that the batsman was dismissed by a catch by the named fielder
- b Bowler – Indicates that the batsman was bowled and dismissed by the named bowler
- st Wicket-keeper – Indicates that the batsman was dismissed after being stumped by the wicket-keeper
- lbw b Bowler – Indicates that the batsman was dismissed by the bowler after being adjudged leg before wicket

Notes

- There is no record of the wicket-keeper in the Port Phillip team.
- The brackets before Method of Dismissal refer to the batting position of the batsman in the second innings.

== Aftermath ==
Following the conclusion of the match, the Port Phillip cricketers won further matches at Bishopthorpe College and may have played further games in Tasmania. Social events continued during and after the game; one journalist, Edmund Finn, wrote: "From the time of landing to the time of embarking the same spirit continued—dinners, balls, musical parties, picnics and every description of entertainment was got up to give a hearty welcome to the strangers from Port Phillip." On the evening of the first day's play, there was a dinner and ball at the Cornwall Hotel; the day after the match, a public ball organised by the Tasmanian hosts took place at the Cornwall Hotel, where the visiting cricketers were staying. The event—attended by more than 350 people, including the Victorians, many of the supporters that had accompanied them, and many of the leading figures in Launceston society—continued into the very early morning. The Tasmanian and Victorian players, accompanied by the Launceston Brass Band, walked together to the wharf from where the visiting players were to depart. The Port Phillip team returned on the Shamrock and reported upon their return that they were "well entertained and well beaten". The Tasmanian bowling—described by the Victorians as "slow and peculiar in character"—was their main explanation for the defeat. One of the umpires from the game, C. J. Weedon, retained a ball used in the match. His family later donated it to the Launceston museum.

Over the following years, the Tasmanian and Victorian teams played several matches. A return match was arranged almost at once. In February 1852, nine Tasmanians travelled to Melbourne and, reinforced by three men from Launceston who were resident in Melbourne, were defeated by the Victoria team by 61 runs at the Melbourne Cricket Club ground. (Note: The match was played on the MCC's old ground on the south bank of the Yarra River rather than the current Melbourne Cricket Ground.) A "deciding game", played two years later at Launceston, was won by Tasmania, but the Victorians only brought eight players and had to use local players to both make up the numbers and to act as the team scorer. The Tasmanians were captained for the final time in first-class cricket by John Marshall, who was 58 years old by this time and had appeared as captain in all three games between the colonies. In early 1858, a Victorian team returned to Tasmania and played two matches, both of which were later recognised as first-class. In one, they defeated a team from Launceston, reinforced by four cricketers from southern Tasmania; they then beat a team from Hobart, composed only of southern Tasmanians. (Note: Although the Hobart team contained only southern players, it was later officially designated as a team representing the whole of Tasmania.) Although both defeats were heavy, the popularity of these games in Tasmania directly led to the formation of a new club, which later became the Southern Tasmanian Cricket Association; it began to organise and develop cricket in Tasmania. Nevertheless, the Victorians were unimpressed by the cricket of the Tasmanians, and their inability to cope with roundarm fast bowling; the teams did not compete against each other regularly for 30 years. Tasmanian cricket remained less developed than that in the rest of Australia until at least the 1880s and failed to keep pace with changes in the game.

Intercolonial cricket gradually spread over the next 20 years. The Victorian team began playing other colonies; their match against New South Wales in Melbourne in 1856 was the first between two mainland colonies. In 1864, a representative Queensland team played New South Wales, although the match was not first-class—Queensland did not play a first-class game until 1893. In 1871, Norwood Cricket Club in Adelaide arranged matches against Melbourne.

The biggest stimulus to the growth of Australian cricket came from England. In 1861–62 and 1863–64, teams of English professional cricketers toured Australia; the latter tour was organised by the Melbourne Club. Neither of the teams played any first-class cricket and all the matches were played "against the odds"—the touring team contained eleven men but played against sides with 22 players. Even so, the games, and the two English teams, were enormously popular despite their superiority, even against the odds—the first team played 12 games, winning 6 and losing 2 with the remainder drawn, and the second team played 16 games, winning 10 and drawing 6. Kilburn and Coward suggest that "the performances of the hardy band of professionals opened Australian eyes and stirred Australian ambitions". Several English players remained in Australia to coach; their influence and the Australian desire to match the English cricketers led to a rapid improvement in the standard of cricket. By 1877, an Australian team was able to defeat an English team with equal odds in what was later recognised as the first Test match.

== First-class status ==
Now, the match is recognised as the initial first-class match to be played in Australia. At the time, it is likely that the players realised that the game was the first to take place between two Australian colonies, and was therefore a historic occasion. Although there were attempts in Australia to identify first-class matches, (Note: In 1908, clarification was sought on the status of a Fijian team. In 1925, the Australian Board of Control adjudicated that Bill Ponsford's score of 429 for Victoria against Tasmania took place in a first-class match and was therefore a world record.) no formal definition was applied in Australia until 1947. A meeting of the International Cricket Conference in 1981 agreed that all intercolonial and interstate matches played in Australia before 1947, including the 1851 match, should retrospectively be considered first-class.

== See also ==
- Intercolonial cricket in Australia

== Bibliography ==
- Clowes, Colin (2007). 150 Years of NSW First-class Cricket: A Chronology. Crows Nest, New South Wales: Allen & Unwin, for Cricket New South Wales. ISBN 978-1-74175-082-9.
- Donnelley, Paul (2010). Firsts, Lasts & Onlys of Cricket: Presenting the Most Amazing Cricket Facts. London: Hamlyn. ISBN 978-0-600-62173-7.
- Dunstan, Keith; Coward, Mike (1986). "Overseas Cricket: Australia". In Swanton, E. W.; Plumptre, George; Woodcock, John (eds.). Barclay's World of Cricket (3rd ed.). London: Willow Books in association with Barclays Bank PLC. pp. 72–73. ISBN 978-0-00-218193-8.
- Harte, Chris (1993). A History of Australian Cricket. London: André Deutsch. ISBN 978-0-233-98825-2.
- Hutchinson, Garrie; Ross, John (2004). 200 Seasons of Australian Cricket. Sydney: Pan Macmillan Australia. ISBN 978-1-4050-3641-2.
- Jackson, Anne (2011). William Philpott Pioneer Victorian First Class Cricketer (PDF). Malvern, Victoria: Malvern Historical Society Inc. ISBN 978-0-9579586-6-1. Archived from the original (PDF) on 19 March 2016.
- Kaufman, Jason; Patterson, Orlando (February 2005). "Cross-National Cultural Diffusion: The Global Spread of Cricket". American Sociological Review. 70 (1): 82–110. doi:10.1177/000312240507000105. JSTOR 414535. S2CID 20809241.
- Kilburn, Jim; Coward, Mike (1986). "Overseas Cricket: Australia". In Swanton, E. W.; Plumptre, George; Woodcock, John (eds.). Barclay's World of Cricket (3rd ed.). London: Willow Books in association with Barclays Bank PLC. pp. 61–68. ISBN 978-0-00-218193-8.
- Plowman, Peter (2004). Ferry to Tasmania: a Short History. Dural, New South Wales: Rosenberg Publishing. ISBN 978-1-877058-27-1.
- Wynne-Thomas, Peter (1989). The Complete History of Cricket Tours at Home and Abroad. London: Guild Publishing. ISBN 978-0-060055-78-3. OCLC 440099345.
