= Antill =

Antill is a surname. Notable people with the surname include:

- Edward Antill (disambiguation), several people
- John Antill (1904–1986), Australian composer
- John Antill (general) (1866–1937), Australian World War I major general
- Thomas Antill (1830–1865), Australian cricketer
