= Intercolonial cricket in Australia =

Cricket matches played between Australian colonies

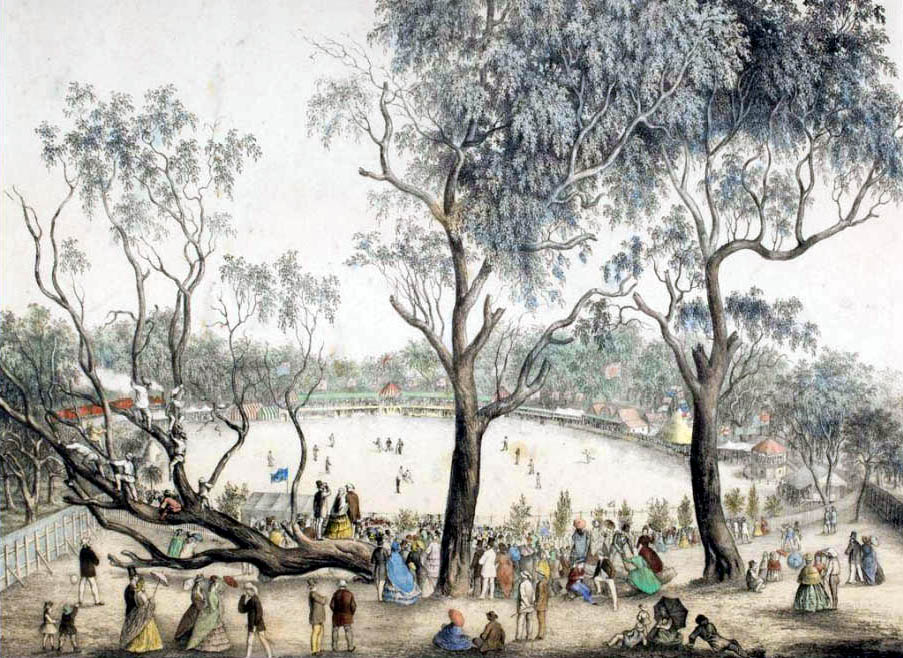
The Melbourne Cricket Ground in 1864.

Intercolonial cricket matches were the first-class cricket matches played between the various colonies of Australia prior to federation in 1901. After federation, they became known as Interstate matches. By the 1880s regular intercolonials were being played, generally with intense rivalry. Matches against visiting professional teams from England also attracted public interest.

== The beginnings ==
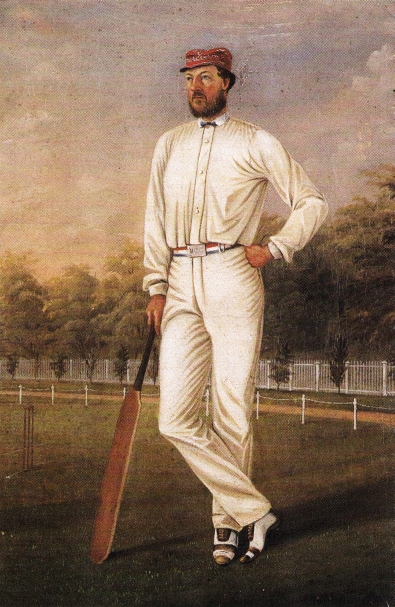
Tom Wills regularly captained Victoria from 1858 to 1876.

In March 1850, the Melbourne Cricket Club issued a challenge to the Launceston Cricket Club for a match between representative cricketers of Port Phillip district (to become Victoria the following year) and Van Diemen's Land (to become Tasmania in 1856). Launceston sent an acceptance, but it was not received in time and so a new challenge was issued and accepted for the following 1850-51 season. Meanwhile, news that legislation for the long-awaited separation of the Port Phillip district from New South Wales had been passed in England was received which prompted a declaration by the Superintendent of the Port Phillip District, Charles La Trobe, for celebrations from November 1850. This legislation and the enabling legislation which was passed in New South Wales on 1 July 1851 created the Colony of Victoria, of which La Trobe later become the first Lieutenant-Governor. The long anticipated cricket match was considered to be a significant part of the euphoric mood within the Victorian colony at the time.

The match finally commenced on 11 February 1851 at the Launceston Racecourse, later to become the Northern Tasmania Cricket Association Ground. The first ball was bowled (underarm) by William Henty for the Launcestonians, to Duncan Cooper of Port Phillip. About 2500 people watched the locals win the match by three wickets.

The following February, nine Tasmanians sailed to Melbourne and joined with three Melbourne based Launcestonians for a return match which was held at the Emerald Hill Cricket Ground on the south bank of the Yarra River, which was the then home ground of the Melbourne Cricket Club. The Victorians won this by 61 runs. Possibly due to distractions from the discovery of gold in Victoria in 1851, the deciding match was not held until March 1854. The MCC moved to the present Melbourne Cricket Ground in September 1853.

== New South Wales at the MCG ==
After issuing a challenge to all-comers with a £500 purse in 1855, Victoria hosted its first big game in March 1856 against New South Wales at the newly occupied Melbourne Cricket Ground. Initially the purse was to be played for, but the New South Welshmen had declined this as they were uncertain of their ability to match the bet. It was a low scoring match in which 5000 people watched the first day's play which included a dramatic batting collapse by the locals who were all out for 63 in their first innings. NSW made 76 in their first innings and Victoria followed with a paltry 28. NSW lost seven wickets in making the required 16 runs. The match was also notable for a dispute which arose after the umpires had tossed and which Victoria had won. New South Wales insisted that, as the visiting team, they had the choice of batting or bowling. Victoria eventually relented and were sent in.

== English tours ==
In March 1861 the first visiting English side toured Australia, dominated by Surrey players. This tour was followed by another in 1863-64, led by George Parr and including the amateur EM Grace. In 1876-77 James Lillywhite brought a professional tour out to Australia which played New South Wales in a two-day match at the Albert Ground in Sydney on 15 & 16 January 1877. This was followed by a timeless match at the MCG commencing on 15 March 1877 which was later designated as the first Test, played between Australia and England.

Attendance at some of these touring matches were similar to the intercolonials which suggests that the local competition was fairly well supported and that there was a healthy intercolonial rivalry. Regular fixtures of New South Wales v. Victoria and Victoria v. Tasmania continued until 1875 with at least one match per season being played.

In 1877-78, South Australia played Tasmania for the first time in a match at the newly created Adelaide Oval in which the attendance of 1870 over two days saw South Australia win comfortably by an innings and 13 runs. The following season saw the infamous Sydney Riot of 1879, in which the visiting English team of Lord Harris was faced by a pitch invasion whilst playing New South Wales at the Sydney Cricket Ground. The cause of the riot is at least partly attributed to the rivalry between Victoria and NSW, as Victoria had supplied the umpire to the English team and an unfavourable decision by him against the local team had incensed the crowd.

== Sheffield Shield ==
In 1891-1892 the Earl of Sheffield was in Australia as the promoter of an English team led by W. G. Grace. The tour included three Tests played in Melbourne, Sydney and Adelaide. At the conclusion of the tour, Sheffield donated £150 to fund a trophy for an annual tournament of intercolonial cricket in Australia. After his departure there was some debate between the organising committees in South Australia, Victoria and New South Wales about how to use the donation, including serious consideration of a proposal to split the money between the committees of the three colonies. This was rejected.

Ultimately a new tournament was decided upon and named the Sheffield Shield in honour of its benefactor. It commenced in the 1892-93 season between New South Wales, Victoria and South Australia. That season also marked the inclusion of Queensland and Western Australia in the intercolonial matches, though they were not admitted to the Shield competition until much later. 4500 people watched Queensland win by 14 runs in its first intercolonial against New South Wales at the Exhibition Ground in Brisbane and Western Australia played its first intercolonial against South Australia in Adelaide. The Western Australians had a miserable tour with a loss to South Australia in Adelaide, being beaten by 10 wickets and a loss to Victoria at the MCG by an innings and 243 runs. The Sheffield Shield competition was effectively played in parallel with other intercolonial matches as Tasmania, Queensland and Western Australia did not join the Sheffield Shield competition until well into the 20th century.

As well as matches between two colonies, frequent combined team matches, (and also classified as first-class) were played such as Smokers v Non-Smokers, Australian XI v Combined XI and New South Wales and Victoria v Australian XI.

From the second Shield competition in 1893/94 each of the Shield teams were playing each other twice each season, both home and away. This format continues today, though with six teams the season now contains 31 matches, including the final.

== Milestones ==
- 1850–51 – Tasmania and Victoria play in the very first intercolonial
- 1855–56 – First match including NSW, played at the newly opened MCG
- 1877–78 – South Australia and Tasmania play in first match at the Adelaide Oval, and the first intercolonial for South Australia. Sydney Cricket Ground also used for the first time when NSW plays Victoria
- 1892–93 – Queensland and Western Australia play in intercolonials for the first time. Sheffield Shield competition between NSW, Victoria and South Australia commences
- 1898–99 – Western Australia hosts its first intercolonial at the WACA Ground in Perth

== Teams ==
=== Victoria ===
The Melbourne Cricket Club (MCC) was formed in 1838, within three years of the establishment of the colony. Early Victorian teams were virtually MCC teams. In 1858 The Victorian Intercolonial Cricket Committee was formed by the leading clubs, to arrange and administer matches between the colonies.

=== New South Wales ===
In 1826 the Australian Cricket Club was formed.

The first match between New South Wales and Victoria was played at the Outer Domain, Sydney on 26 March 1856.

== See also ==
- List of Australian intercolonial cricket matches
- History of Test cricket (to 1883)
