= Alfred Burchett =

Australian cricketer

Personal information
- Born: 1831
- Died: 12 November 1888 (aged 56–57); Melbourne, Australia

Domestic team information
- Years: Team
- 1858-1860: Victoria
- Source: Cricinfo, 2 May 2015

Alfred Burchett (1831 – 12 November 1888) was an Australian cricketer. He played two first-class cricket matches for Victoria between 1858 and 1860. He also played for Melbourne Cricket Club.

== See also ==
- List of Victoria first-class cricketers
- Intercolonial cricket in Australia
- List of Australian intercolonial cricket matches
