= History of Australian cricket to 1876 =

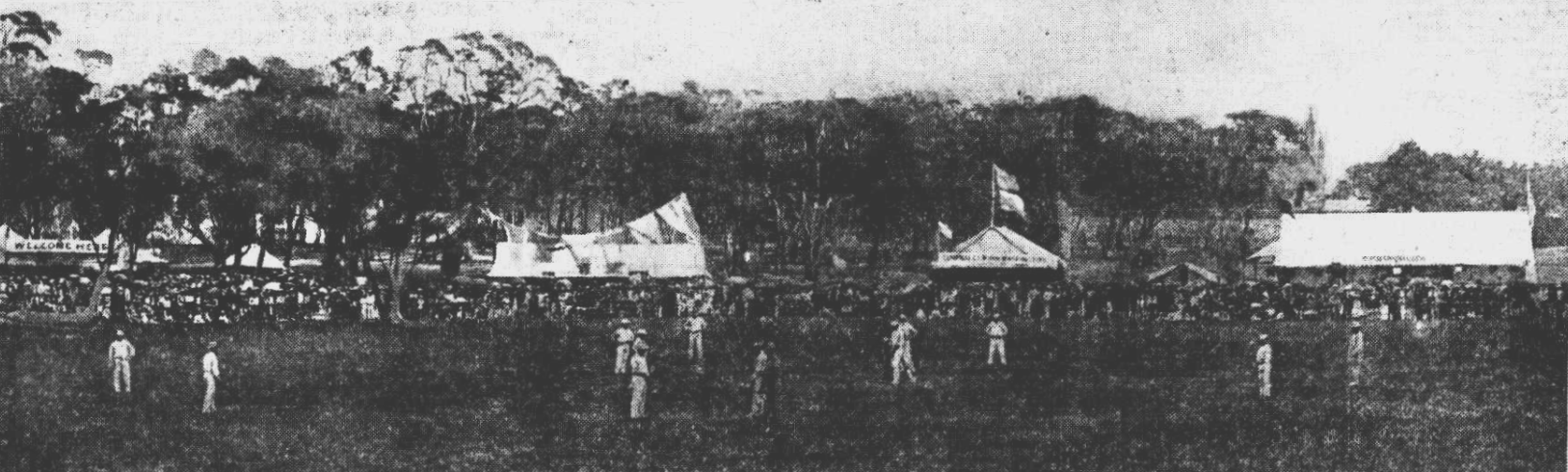
Illustration of a match between England XI and N.S.W. in January, 1862.

This is an article that describes the history of Australian cricket from its known beginnings until the eve of the first-ever Test matches between Australia and England, which took place in the 1876–77 season.

== Origins ==
Cricket was already established in England at the time Australia was first settled by Europeans in the late 18th century. Cricket soon arrived in Australia and the first definite Australian references to the sport are found in 1804, when the January edition of The Sydney Gazette recorded that recent weather had been favourable to cricketers.

Cricket soon became a very popular sport in Australia, especially in the south-eastern colonies. In Sydney, the Military Cricket Club played games in the 1830s against the Australian Cricket Club, including one at Hyde Park in 1833 and the Racecourse in 1834, as well as against an Australian civilian XI in 1834. In rural New South Wales, the Queanbeyan District Cricket Club was officially formed in 1863 having played games against teams from local towns through the 1850s. first-class status was achieved as early as the 1850s.

== Commencement of first-class cricket ==
In March 1850, the Melbourne Cricket Club issued a challenge to the Launceston Cricket Club for a match that was eventually played in the 1850–51 season. On 11 & 12 February 1851, Tasmania v Victoria at Launceston Racecourse was the inaugural first-class match played in Australia. Tasmania won by 3 wickets.

== Development of inter-colonial cricket ==
Tasmania and Victoria played each other three times up to 1855 and then the New South Wales team made its debut in 1855–56 when it defeated Victoria by 3 wickets in the inaugural first-class match at the Melbourne Cricket Ground.

The 1857–58 season was a milestone as it featured three first-class matches involving all of New South Wales, Tasmania and Victoria. Victoria played in all three matches and won them. They defeated New South Wales by 171 runs at the Melbourne Cricket Ground and then defeated Tasmania twice: at Launceston by an innings and 20 runs; and at Hobart by 69 runs.

Although it was impossible due to travel constraints to arrange first-class matches between the colonies in every season, there was a steady rate of growth, especially at club level. The sport received a considerable boost when English teams began arriving in the colonies in 1861–62 and especially when the legendary WG Grace himself toured Australia in 1873–74. By 1876, standards in Australia had become very high indeed especially with the emergence of a world-class bowler like Fred Spofforth. Australia was then ready to oppose England on level terms.

For detailed information about early domestic cricket in Australia, see : Intercolonial cricket in Australia and List of Australian intercolonial cricket matches

== International tours ==
=== 1861–62 ===
The inaugural English tour of Australia was organised by Messrs Spiers & Pond. Led by HH Stephenson, the English team was a great success that inspired later tours.

=== 1863–64 ===
The Melbourne Cricket Club organised a tour by an English team under the captaincy of George Parr, which also visited New Zealand. No first-class matches were played. The English team was unbeaten and its overall record was 16 played, 10 wins and six draws.

=== 1873–74 ===
The Melbourne Cricket Club organised a tour by an English team under the captaincy of WG Grace, which played 15 matches in all but none were first-class.

== External sources ==
- CricketArchive — itinerary of Australian cricket
- Early cricket in Australia – State Library of NSW
