= Gerard Hodgkinson =

English cricketer (1883–1960)

Personal information
- Full name: Gerard William Hodgkinson
- Born: 19 February 1883; Clifton, Bristol, England
- Died: 6 October 1960 (aged 77); Wookey Hole, Somerset, England
- Batting: Right-handed
- Role: Batsman
- Relatives: C. Hodgkinson (son); R. Philpott (grandfather); W. Philpott (grand-uncle)

Domestic team information
- Years: Team
- 1904–11: Somerset
- First-class debut: 12 May 1904 Somerset v Oxford University
- Last First-class: 5 August 1911 Somerset v Surrey

Career statistics
Competition	First-class
Matches	19
Runs scored	515
Batting average	15.14
100s/50s	–/1
Top score	99*
Balls bowled	–
Wickets	–
Bowling average	–
5 wickets in innings	–
10 wickets in match	–
Best bowling	–
Catches/stumpings	6/–
- Source: CricketArchive, 4 December 2010

Gerard William Hodgkinson OBE MC* (19 February 1883 – 6 October 1960) played first-class cricket for Somerset between 1904 and 1911. He was born at Clifton, Bristol and died at Wookey Hole, Somerset. He was also the plaintiff in a celebrated literary libel case in the 1930s and a decorated soldier and airman who saw service in both the First and Second World Wars.

== Early life ==
Hodgkinson's family owned and operated the Wookey Hole Paper Mill, which was established in 1610. Handmade paper is still produced there from raw cotton. In the early years of the 20th century, the mill employed 200 people, and local caves on the river Axe on the property had been known from early times, but the discovery in Victorian times of an extensive network of linked caves turned the business increasingly into a tourism one. The family home was Glencot House, a mock-Jacobean pile completed in 1887 and now a luxury hotel. Hodgkinson's maternal grandfather was Richard Philpott, who played for Victoria in the inaugural first-class cricket match in Australia, but lived most of his life in England.

Hodgkinson was educated at Eton College and then joined the family business.

== Cricketing career ==
In 1904, Hodgkinson made the first two of 19 first-class cricket appearances for Somerset as a right-handed middle- or lower-order batsman. He was not successful in his 1904 matches for Somerset, nor when he reappeared in two games in 1906. In 1907, he played six times for the county, the most appearances in a single season, and made 49 in the match against Worcestershire, his highest to that point: this was the match in which Bert Bisgood, making his first-class debut, scored 82 and an unbeaten 116, the first time a Somerset batsman made 100 on debut. Hodgkinson did not play for Somerset in 1908 or 1909, but returned for four games in 1910 and in his first match of the season, against Gloucestershire he made the highest score of his career. Coming in with Somerset at 134 for six wickets, he hit 99 before his partner for a last-wicket stand of 68, Jack White, was out, leaving him a run short of a century. He never reached such heights again in first-class cricket: that was his only score of more than 50, though in the match against the Indians in 1911 he made 44 in the first innings and 41 in the second. He did not appear in first-class cricket after the 1911 season.

== Military career ==
Hodgkinson's Royal Air Force record held in The National Archives indicates that although in the First World War his "home" was at Wookey, he was also at this stage a "settler" in British East Africa.

Hodgkinson joined the East African Mounted Rifles on 10 August 1914, six days after the war had been declared. He later transferred to the 2nd County of London Yeomanry (Westminster Dragoons), but from 1916 he was seconded to the Royal Flying Corps as a pilot. In June 1917, still seconded to the Royal Flying Corps, he was promoted from second lieutenant to lieutenant and had by this time been awarded the Military Cross. He was awarded a Bar to the Military Cross in the 1918 New Year Honours. In February 1920, the London Gazette reported that he was "unemployed" from March 1919 with the rank of captain. And in 1921 he was finally officially discharged from the County of London Yeomanry.

Hand-written notes in his record from 1918 state that he has "extensive knowledge of Central Africa and South Somaliland and the Swahili language" and said that he was a "fit GS (flying) with a strong recommendation for duty in a warm climate". He appears to have served in the East Africa region from July 1918 until his effective discharge the following year.

== Later life and literary libel ==
An obituary in 1996 of Hodgkinson's son Colin, who was born in 1920 and who himself had an extraordinary career as a war-time pilot despite losing both legs in an air accident, gives a portrait of Gerard Hodgkinson in the inter-war period. "[Colin]'s earliest memories of his father were of a powerful man in hunting pink. As he learned later, he was an outstanding Master of Foxhounds with the Mendip, a big-game hunter and a fine shot," it says. Hodgkinson was joint master of the Mendip Farmers' Hunt from 1929 to 1932. He was also the owner and manager of the Wookey Hole Caves at this time.

In 1932, the novelist John Cowper Powys published A Glastonbury Romance, the second of his so-called Wessex novels. The plot traced the activities of a large number of people within a fictionalised small Somerset town where there is a struggle between a charismatic and mystical leader John Geard, and the local landowner, Philip Crow, whose ownership and entrepreneurial exploitation of mining at the Wookey Hole caves is a counterpoint to the folk mysticism of Geard and the activities of anarchists and revolutionaries within the town. Though the plot is clearly fantastical, Powys ingenuously blended real places and people into the novel and Hodgkinson successfully sued for libel on the basis that the person, the character and the activities of the capitalist Philip Crow were based on him. The libel case had a direct effect on Powys's career and output: subsequent editions of A Glastonbury Romance carried disclaimers reinforcing its status as fiction, and Powys's next novel Weymouth Sands was revised and published under a different name in the UK to avoid a repetition of the lawsuit from citizens of Weymouth.

== Second World War service and after ==
Although he was in his late 50s, Hodgkinson was re-commissioned as a pilot officer in the Royal Air Force in January 1940. In July 1940 he was given the rank of flying officer. He was appointed officer of the Order of the British Empire in the 1945 New Year Honours, by which time he was a squadron leader in the RAF Reserve. He finally retired from the RAF on 23 July 1945 and was granted the rank of wing commander on his retirement. A collection of material about his son, Colin, indicates that Hodgkinson was involved in intelligence work in the RAF during the war.

Hodgkinson had sold the family home at Glencot in the 1930s but continued to live and work in Wookey until his death. The mill and caves complex was sold to Madame Tussauds in 1973, 13 years after his death.
