= John Marshall (cricketer, born 1796) =

Australian cricketer

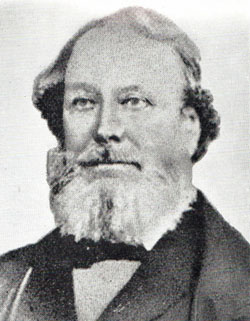

Personal information
- Full name: John Marshall
- Born: 1796; England
- Died: 7 September 1876 (aged 79–80); New Town, Tasmania
- Role: Wicket-keeper

Domestic team information
- Years: Team
- 1850/51–1853/54: Tasmania

Career statistics
| Competition | First-class |
|---|---|
| Matches | 3 |
| Runs scored | 46 |
| Batting average | 7.66 |
| 100s/50s | –/– |
| Top score | 13 |
| Balls bowled | 12 |
| Wickets | – |
| Bowling average | – |
| 5 wickets in innings | – |
| 10 wickets in match | – |
| Best bowling | – |
| Catches/stumpings | –/1 |
- Source: Cricinfo, 2 January 2011

John Marshall (1796 – 7 September 1876) was an Australian cricketer who played three first-class cricket games for Tasmania.

He had the distinction of captaining and being the wicketkeeper for Tasmania in the first ever first-class cricket match in Australia, which Tasmania won. He stumped the Victorian batsman Thomas Antill for 0 off the bowling of William Henty, making him the first wicket-keeper to effect a stumping in first-class cricket in Australia. His wicket-keeping was described in the Melbourne press as "seldom surpassed in England – almost perfect; as sharp as a needle". Marshall captained Tasmania in all three matches in which he represented the colony, with a record of two wins and one loss.

He was famous for having never cut his beard since his teen years. John Marshall was 58 when he played his last game for Tasmania, holding a record that survives today as Australia's oldest first-class cricketer. He played for Hobart Town Cricket Club for over twenty years and was one of their all-time champions, still holding many local records in the Tasmanian Grade Cricket competition.

In 1840 he married a Miss Tabart, daughter of a "gentleman farmer" from Oatlands. He worked for the Bank of Van Diemen's Land, retiring as a senior accountant.

John Marshall died on 7 September 1876, in New Town, Tasmania at the age of 80.

== See also ==
- List of Tasmanian representative cricketers
