= Robert McDowell =

Robert McDowell may refer to:

- R. B. McDowell (Robert Brendan McDowell, 1913–2011), Irish historian
- Robert H. McDowell (1894–1980), American historian and intelligence officer
- Robert M. McDowell (born 1963), American politician
- Robert McDowell (poet), American poet, founder of Poets' Prize, editor of The Reaper magazine
- Zenith (comics) (published 1987–1992), British comic superhero whose full name is Robert Neal Cassady McDowell

== See also ==
- Robert McDowall (1821–1894), Scottish-born Australian cricketer
- Bob McDowall (1939–2011), New Zealand ichthyologist
- Robert McDowell McCracken (1874–1934), American politician from Idaho
- Robert McDouall (1774–1848), Scottish-born officer in the British Army
