= Adam Griffith =

Australian cricketer (born 1978)

Personal information
- Full name: Adam Richard Griffith
- Born: 11 February 1978 (age 48); Launceston, Tasmania, Australia
- Height: 198 cm (6 ft 6 in)
- Batting: Right-handed
- Bowling: Right-arm fast

Domestic team information
- Years: Team
- 2002/03–2010/11: Tasmania
- 2006: Leicestershire

Career statistics
Competition	FC	LA	T20
Matches	50	54	12
Runs scored	691	88	7
Batting average	12.33	6.76	3.50
100s/50s	0/0	0/0	0/0
Top score	47	33	6
Balls bowled	10,630	2,798	261
Wickets	169	63	19
Bowling average	34.31	35.01	15.21
5 wickets in innings	7	0	0
10 wickets in match	1	0	0
Best bowling	7/54	4/36	3/14
Catches/stumpings	6/0	9/0	0/0
- Source: Cricinfo, 7 January 2012

Adam Richard 'Eddy' Griffith (born 11 February 1978) is a former Australian cricket player and Australian bowling coach. He was appointed as the cricket coach for Tasmania for the 2017–2018 season. He played first-class cricket for Tasmania and also had a spell at Leicestershire. He played his club cricket for South Launceston Cricket Club & North Hobart Cricket Club.

== Playing career ==
Griffith represented his native state of Tasmania between 2002 and 2010, and was a member of Tasmania's first-ever Sheffield Shield winning team in 2006–07. He took 158 first-class wickets for Tasmania; at the time of his retirement he was the fifth-highest wicket taker in the state's history. He also represented Australia A in limited overs cricket and had a spell playing in England for Leicestershire. As his career became increasingly affected by injuries, he retired in May 2011 at the age of 33.

== Coaching career ==
In 2011 Adam immediately moved into coaching, first as the bowling coach for the Western Warriors, working under Mickey Arthur. When Arthur was appointed the coach of Australia, Griffith was promoted to the role of Western Australia's assistant coach.

Griffith was named the Australian bowling coach on 15 April 2016. After working with Justin Langer at the Western Warriors and Perth Scorchers, he was chosen after Craig McDermott stepped down after the World 20.

On 27 April 2017 Griffith was appointed head coach of Tasmania. He is currently serving as the fast bowling coach of Royal Challengers Banglore cricket team in IPL from 2020.
