= List of Australian intercolonial cricket matches =

This is a list of Australian intercolonial cricket matches. It lists only those first-class matches played between the various Australian colonies prior to Federation on 1 January 1901. Matches listed include composite team matches, such as Australian XI or Rest of Australia, played against either another composite team, or a colony.

Additional first-class matches (not listed here) were played and included matches between representative colonial teams and visiting overseas teams. Some of these matches are recorded as Test matches. See separate articles History of Test cricket from 1877 to 1883, History of Test cricket from 1884 to 1889 and History of Test cricket from 1890 to 1900 for more details.

== List of matches ==
Season	Colonies	Venue	Date	Result	Ref
1850–51	Tasmania v Victoria	Launceston Cricket Club Ground	11–12 February 1851	Tasmania won by 3 wickets	
1851–52	Victoria v Tasmania	South Yarra Ground, Melbourne	29–30 March 1852	Victoria won by 61 runs	
1853–54	Tasmania v Victoria	Launceston Cricket Club Ground	3–4 March 1854	Tasmania won by 8 wickets	
1855–56	Victoria v New South Wales	Melbourne Cricket Ground	26–27 March 1856	New South Wales won by 3 wickets	
1856–57	New South Wales v Victoria	The Domain, Sydney	14–16 January 1857	New South Wales won by 65 runs	
1857–58	Victoria v New South Wales	Melbourne Cricket Ground	12–14 January 1858	Victoria won by 171 runs	
1857–58	Tasmania v Victoria	Launceston Cricket Club Ground	25–26 February 1858	Victoria won by an innings and 20 runs	
1857–58	Tasmania v Victoria	Lower Domain Ground, Hobart	4–5 March 1858	Victoria won by 69 runs	
1858–59	New South Wales v Victoria	The Domain, Sydney	20–22 January 1859	Victoria won by 2 wickets	
1859–60	Victoria v New South Wales	Melbourne Cricket Ground	2–4 February 1860	Victoria won by 69 runs	
1860–61	New South Wales v Victoria	The Domain, Sydney	14–16 February 1861	Victoria won by 21 runs	
1861–62	Victoria v New South Wales	Melbourne Cricket Ground	9–11 January 1862	Victoria won by 10 wickets	
1862–63	New South Wales v Victoria	The Domain, Sydney	5–7 February 1863	New South Wales won by 84 runs	
1865–66	Victoria v New South Wales	Melbourne Cricket Ground	26–28 December 1865	Victoria won by an innings and 20 runs	
1866–67	New South Wales v Victoria	The Domain, Sydney	26–27 December 1866	New South Wales won by an innings and 13 runs	
1867–68	Victoria v New South Wales	Melbourne Cricket Ground	26–30 December 1867	Victoria won by 7 wickets	
1868–69	Victoria v Tasmania	Melbourne Cricket Ground	12–13 February 1869	Victoria won by an innings and 260 runs	
1868–69	New South Wales v Victoria	The Domain, Sydney	4–6 March 1869	Victoria won by 78 runs	
1869–70	Victoria v New South Wales	Melbourne Cricket Ground	24–28 February 1870	Victoria won by 265 runs	
1870–71	Victoria v Tasmania	Melbourne Cricket Ground	24–25 February 1871	Victoria won by 10 wickets	
1870–71	New South Wales v Victoria	Albert Ground, Sydney	9–11, 13 March 1871	Victoria won by 48 runs	
1871–72	Victoria v New South Wales	Melbourne Cricket Ground	30 March–1 April 1872	Victoria won by an innings and 26 runs	
1872–73	Victoria v Rest of Australia	Melbourne Cricket Ground	26–28 December 1872	Rest of Australia won by 5 wickets	
1872–73	New South Wales v Victoria	Albert Ground, Sydney	28 February–2, 7–8 March 1873	Victoria won by 24 runs	
1872–73	Tasmania v Victoria	Launceston Cricket Club Ground	14–15 March 1873	Victoria won by 7 wickets	
1874–75	Victoria v New South Wales	Melbourne Cricket Ground	26, 28–30 December 1874	New South Wales won by 6 wickets	
1874–75	New South Wales v Victoria	Albert Ground, Sydney	5–6, 8 March 1875	New South Wales won by 77 runs	
1875–76	Victoria v New South Wales	Melbourne Cricket Ground	27–29 December 1875	New South Wales won by an innings and 1 run	
1875–76	New South Wales v Victoria	Albert Ground, Sydney	25–26, 28 February 1876	New South Wales won by 195 runs	
1877–78	South Australia v Tasmania	Adelaide Oval	10, 12 November 1877	South Australia won by an innings and 13 runs	
1877–78	Victoria v New South Wales	Melbourne Cricket Ground	26–27 December 1877	New South Wales won by an innings and 6 runs	
1877–78	New South Wales v Victoria	Association Ground, Sydney	22–23, 25 February 1878	New South Wales won by 1 wicket	
1879–80	New South Wales v Victoria	Association Ground, Sydney	21–22, 24 November 1879	New South Wales won by 32 runs	
1879–80	Victoria v New South Wales	Melbourne Cricket Ground	26–27 December 1879	Victoria won by an innings and 96 runs	
1880–81	Victoria v South Australia	East Melbourne Cricket Ground	12–13, 15 November 1880	Victoria won by 7 wickets	
1880–81	Victoria v New South Wales	Melbourne Cricket Ground	27–29 December 1880	Victoria won by 2 wickets	
1880–81	New South Wales and Victoria Combined XI v Australian XI	Melbourne Cricket Ground	1, 3–4 January 1881	Australian XI won by 178 runs	
1880–81	New South Wales v Victoria	Association Ground, Sydney	18–19, 21 February 1881	Victoria won by 30 runs	
1880–81	New South Wales and Victoria Combined XI v Australian XI	Association Ground, Sydney	4–5, 7–8 March 1881	New South Wales and Victoria Combined XI won by 246 runs	
1880–81	South Australia v Victoria	Adelaide Oval	1–2, 4 April 1881	Victoria won by 151 runs	
1881–82	Victoria v New South Wales	Melbourne Cricket Ground	24, 26–27 December 1881	Victoria won by 2 wickets	
1881–82	New South Wales v Victoria	Association Ground, Sydney	10–11, 13–15 February 1882	New South Wales won by an innings and 138 runs	
1881–82	South Australia v Victoria	Adelaide Oval	10–11, 13 March 1882	South Australia won by 31 runs	
1882–83	Victoria v New South Wales	Melbourne Cricket Ground	23, 26–29 December 1882	New South Wales won by 7 wickets	
1882–83	New South Wales v Victoria	Association Ground, Sydney	9–10 February 1883	Victoria won by an innings and 166 runs	
1882–83	Victoria v South Australia	East Melbourne Cricket Ground	24, 26–27 March 1883	Victoria won by an innings and 98 runs	
1883–84	Victoria v New South Wales	Melbourne Cricket Ground	26–29, 31 December 1883	Victoria won by 3 wickets	
1883–84	Australian XI v Combined XI	Melbourne Cricket Ground	1–3 January 1884	Match drawn	
1883–84	New South Wales v Victoria	Association Ground, Sydney	8–9, 11–12 February 1884	New South Wales won by 202 runs	
1883–84	Australian XI v Combined XI	Association Ground, Sydney	15–16, 18 February 1884	Australian XI won by 9 wickets	
1883–84	South Australia v Victoria	Adelaide Oval	22–23, 25–27 February 1884	Victoria won by 4 wickets	
1884–85	Victoria v New South Wales	Melbourne Cricket Ground	26–27, 29–30 December 1884	Victoria won by an innings and 5 runs	
1884–85	Victoria v South Australia	Melbourne Cricket Ground	23–24, 26 January 1885	South Australia won by 53 runs	
1884–85	New South Wales v Victoria	Association Ground, Sydney	13–14, 16–17 February 1885	New South Wales won by 3 wickets	
1885–86	Victoria v New South Wales	Melbourne Cricket Ground	26, 28–30 December 1885	Victoria won by an innings and 69 runs	
1885–86	Victoria v Australian XI	Melbourne Cricket Ground	1–2, 4 January 1886	Australian XI won by 10 wickets	
1885–86	New South Wales v Victoria	Association Ground, Sydney	23, 25–28 January 1886	New South Wales won by 150 runs	
1885–86	South Australia v Victoria	Adelaide Oval	11–13, 15 March 1886	South Australia won by 40 runs	
1886–87	Victoria v New South Wales	Melbourne Cricket Ground	27–30 December 1886	New South Wales won by 184 runs	
1886–87	New South Wales v Victoria	Association Ground, Sydney	22, 24–28 January 1887	New South Wales won by 6 wickets	
1886–87	Victoria v South Australia	Melbourne Cricket Ground	11–12, 14 February 1887	Victoria won by 144 runs	
1886–87	Smokers v Non-Smokers	East Melbourne Cricket Ground	17–19, 21 March 1887	Match drawn	
1887–88	Victoria v New South Wales	Melbourne Cricket Ground	24, 26–27 December 1887	New South Wales won by 2 wickets	
1887–88	New South Wales v Victoria	Association Ground, Sydney	26–28, 30–31 January 1888	New South Wales won by an innings and 35 runs	
1887–88	South Australia v Victoria	Adelaide Oval	17–18, 20 February 1888	South Australia won by an innings and 113 runs	
1888–89	South Australia v Australian XI	Adelaide Oval	23–24, 26 November 1888	South Australia won by 8 wickets	
1888–89	Victoria v Australian XI	Melbourne Cricket Ground	7–8, 10 December 1888	Australian XI won by an innings and 22 runs	
1888–89	New South Wales v Australian XI	Association Ground, Sydney	21–22, 24, 26 December 1888	Match drawn	
1888–89	Victoria v South Australia	Melbourne Cricket Ground	26–29 December 1888	Victoria won by 15 runs	
1888–89	Victoria v Tasmania	East Melbourne Cricket Ground	1–5 January 1889	Victoria won by 9 wickets	
1888–89	Victoria v New South Wales	Melbourne Cricket Ground	11–12, 14–15 January 1889	New South Wales won by 6 wickets	
1888–89	New South Wales v Victoria	Association Ground, Sydney	26, 28–30 January 1889	Victoria won by 12 runs	
1888–89	Rest of Australia v Australian XI	Association Ground, Sydney	1–2, 4–5 February 1889	Australian XI won by 214 runs	
1889–90	South Australia v Victoria	Adelaide Oval	13–14, 16–17 December 1889	Victoria won by 18 runs	
1889–90	Victoria v New South Wales	Melbourne Cricket Ground	26–28, 30 December 1889	Victoria won by 8 wickets	
1889–90	Tasmania v Victoria	Tasmania Cricket Association Ground, Hobart	8–9 January 1890	Victoria won by an innings and 147 runs	
1889–90	New South Wales v Victoria	Association Ground, Sydney	25, 27–30 January 1890	New South Wales won by 4 wickets	
1889–90	New South Wales v South Australia	Association Ground, Sydney	14–15, 17–18 February 1890	New South Wales won by 9 wickets	
1890–91	South Australia v New South Wales	Adelaide Oval	19–20, 22–23 December 1890	New South Wales won by 6 wickets	
1890–91	Victoria v New South Wales	Melbourne Cricket Ground	26–27, 29 December 1890	Victoria won by 36 runs	
1890–91	Victoria v South Australia	Melbourne Cricket Ground	1–3, 5 January 1891	South Australia won by an innings and 62 runs	
1890–91	New South Wales v Victoria	Association Ground, Sydney	24, 26–29 January 1891	New South Wales won by an innings and 94 runs	
1890–91	Victoria v Tasmania	Melbourne Cricket Ground	30 March–1 April 1891	Victoria won by 9 wickets	
1891–92	South Australia v Victoria	Adelaide Oval	7, 9–11 November 1891	South Australia won by an innings and 164 runs	
1891–92	Victoria v New South Wales	Melbourne Cricket Ground	26, 28–30 December 1891	Victoria won by 6 wickets	
1891–92	New South Wales v South Australia	Association Ground, Sydney	8–9, 11–13 January 1892	South Australia won by an innings and 53 runs	
1891–92	New South Wales v Victoria	Association Ground, Sydney	23, 25–27 January 1892	Victoria won by an innings and 15 runs	
1892–93	South Australia v New South Wales	Adelaide Oval	16–17, 19–21 December 1892	South Australia won by 57 runs	
1892–93	Victoria v New South Wales	Melbourne Cricket Ground	24, 26–29 December 1892	Victoria won by 8 wickets	
1892–93	Victoria v South Australia	Melbourne Cricket Ground	31 December 1892, 2–4 January 1893	Victoria won by 6 wickets	
1892–93	New South Wales v South Australia	Association Ground, Sydney	7, 9–10 January 1893	New South Wales won by an innings and 60 runs	
1892–93	New South Wales v Victoria	Association Ground, Sydney	26–28, 30–31 January 1893	Victoria won by 232 runs	
1892–93	Tasmania v Victoria	Northern Tasmania Cricket Association Ground, Launceston	28, 30 January–1 February 1893	Victoria won by 4 wickets	
1892–93	South Australia v Victoria	Adelaide Oval	16–18, 20–21 March 1893	Victoria won by 5 wickets	
1892–93	South Australia v Western Australia	Adelaide Oval	27–28 March 1893	South Australia won by 10 wickets	
1892–93	Queensland v New South Wales	Brisbane Exhibition Ground	1, 3–4 April 1893	Queensland won by 14 runs	
1892–93	Victoria v Western Australia	Melbourne Cricket Ground	1, 3–4 April 1893	Victoria won by an innings and 243 runs	
1893–94	South Australia v New South Wales	Adelaide Oval	15–16, 18–19 December 1893	South Australia won by 237 runs	
1893–94	Victoria v New South Wales	Melbourne Cricket Ground	23, 26–30 December 1893	Victoria won by 3 wickets	
1893–94	Victoria v South Australia	Melbourne Cricket Ground	1–4 January 1894	South Australia won by 74 runs	
1893–94	New South Wales v South Australia	Association Ground, Sydney	6, 8–9 January 1894	New South Wales won by an innings and 158 runs	
1893–94	New South Wales v Victoria	Association Ground, Sydney	26–27, 29–30 January 1894	New South Wales won by 19 runs	
1893–94	Victoria v Tasmania	Melbourne Cricket Ground	26–27, 29 January 1894	Victoria won by 7 wickets	
1893–94	South Australia v Victoria	Adelaide Oval	2–3, 5–7 March 1894	South Australia won by 58 runs	
1893–94	New South Wales v Queensland	Association Ground, Sydney	24, 26–28 March 1894	New South Wales won by 2 wickets	
1894–95	South Australia v Victoria	Adelaide Oval	30 November–1, 3 December 1894	South Australia won by 10 wickets	
1894–95	Victoria v New South Wales	Melbourne Cricket Ground	22, 24, 26–27 December 1894	Victoria won by 161 runs	
1894–95	South Australia v New South Wales	Adelaide Oval	5, 7–9 January 1895	South Australia won by 4 wickets	
1894–95	New South Wales v Victoria	Sydney Cricket Ground	25–26, 28–31 January 1895	Victoria won by 55 runs	
1894–95	Tasmania v Victoria	Tasmania Cricket Association Ground, Hobart	26, 28–30 January 1895	Tasmania won by 8 wickets	
1894–95	Queensland v New South Wales	Brisbane Exhibition Ground	9, 11–12 February 1895	New South Wales won by 6 wickets	
1894–95	Victoria v South Australia	Melbourne Cricket Ground	15–16, 18–19 February 1895	Victoria won by 10 wickets	
1894–95	New South Wales v South Australia	Sydney Cricket Ground	22–23, 25–26 February 1895	New South Wales won by 111 runs	
1895–96	South Australia v Victoria	Adelaide Oval	9, 11–13 November 1895	Victoria won by 66 runs	
1895–96	New South Wales v Queensland	Sydney Cricket Ground	13–14, 16–17 December 1895	New South Wales won by 9 wickets	
1895–96	Victoria v New South Wales	Melbourne Cricket Ground	26–28, 30–31 December 1895	New South Wales won by 123 runs	
1895–96	South Australia v New South Wales	Adelaide Oval	3–4, 6 January 1896	New South Wales won by an innings and 34 runs	
1895–96	New South Wales v Victoria	Sydney Cricket Ground	25, 27–30 January 1896	Victoria won by 4 wickets	
1895–96	Victoria v Tasmania	Melbourne Cricket Ground	25, 27 January 1896	Tasmania won by an innings and 58 runs	
1895–96	Victoria v South Australia	Melbourne Cricket Ground	21–22, 24 February 1896	South Australia won by 10 wickets	
1895–96	New South Wales v South Australia	Sydney Cricket Ground	28–29 February, 2–4 March 1896	New South Wales won by 9 wickets	
1895–96	Australian XI v Rest of Australia	Sydney Cricket Ground	6–7, 9–10 March 1896	Australian XI won by 2 wickets	
1896–97	South Australia v New South Wales	Adelaide Oval	19, 21–23 December 1896	New South Wales won by 51 runs	
1896–97	Victoria v New South Wales	Melbourne Cricket Ground	26, 28–30 December 1896	New South Wales won by 9 wickets	
1896–97	Victoria v South Australia	Melbourne Cricket Ground	1–2, 4–5 January 1897	Victoria won by 49 runs	
1896–97	New South Wales v South Australia	Sydney Cricket Ground	8–9, 11 January 1897	New South Wales won by an innings and 11 runs	
1896–97	Tasmania v Victoria	Northern Tasmania Cricket Association Ground, Launceston	20–22 January 1897	Victoria won by 8 wickets	
1896–97	New South Wales v Victoria	Sydney Cricket Ground	23, 25–28 January 1897	New South Wales won by 192 runs	
1896–97	South Australia v Victoria	Adelaide Oval	26–27 February, 1 March 1897	South Australia won by an innings and 70 runs	
1896–97	Queensland v New South Wales	Brisbane Exhibition Ground	16–17, 19 April 1897	New South Wales won by an innings and 101 runs	
1897–98	South Australia v Victoria	Adelaide Oval	13, 15–17 November 1897	South Australia won by 9 wickets	
1897–98	Victoria v New South Wales	Melbourne Cricket Ground	27–30 December 1897	Victoria won by 149 runs	
1897–98	South Australia v New South Wales	Adelaide Oval	8, 10–12 January 1898	New South Wales won by 216 runs	
1897–98	New South Wales v Victoria	Sydney Cricket Ground	22, 24–27 January 1898	Victoria won by 3 wickets	
1897–98	Victoria v Tasmania	Melbourne Cricket Ground	22, 24–25 January 1898	Tasmania won by 72 runs	
1897–98	Victoria v South Australia	Melbourne Cricket Ground	11–12, 14–15 February 1898	Victoria won by 26 runs	
1897–98	New South Wales v South Australia	Sydney Cricket Ground	18–19, 21–22 February 1898	South Australia won by 295 runs	
1898–99	South Australia v Victoria	Adelaide Oval	12, 14–17 November 1898	Victoria won by 296 runs	
1898–99	New South Wales v Tasmania	Sydney Cricket Ground	9–10, 12 December 1898	New South Wales won by an innings and 487 runs	
1898–99	South Australia v New South Wales	Adelaide Oval	16–17, 19–21 December 1898	South Australia won by 57 runs	
1898–99	Victoria v New South Wales	Melbourne Cricket Ground	24, 26–27 December 1898	Victoria won by 190 runs	
1898–99	Victoria v South Australia	Melbourne Cricket Ground	31 December 1898, 2–3 January 1899	Victoria won by an innings and 218 runs	
1898–99	New South Wales v South Australia	Sydney Cricket Ground	6–7, 9–11 January 1899	New South Wales won by 3 wickets	
1898–99	Queensland v South Australia	Brisbane Cricket Ground	14, 16–17 January 1899	South Australia won by an innings and 284 runs	
1898–99	New South Wales v Victoria	Sydney Cricket Ground	26–28, 30 January 1899	New South Wales won by 8 wickets	
1898–99	Tasmania v Victoria	Tasmania Cricket Association Ground, Hobart	26–28, 30 January 1899	Tasmania won by 365 runs	
1898–99	Australian XI v Rest of Australia	Sydney Cricket Ground	3–4, 6–8 March 1899	Australian XI won by 7 wickets	
1898–99	Australian XI v Rest of Australia	Melbourne Cricket Ground	10–11, 13 March 1899	Australian XI won by 9 wickets	
1898–99	Australian XI v Rest of Australia	Adelaide Oval	17–18, 20–22 March 1899	Australian XI won by 4 wickets	
1898–99	Western Australia v South Australia	WACA Ground	3–6 April 1899	South Australia won by 4 wickets	
1899–00	New South Wales v Queensland	Sydney Cricket Ground	17–18, 20–21 November 1899	New South Wales won by an innings and 315 runs	
1899–00	South Australia v Victoria	Adelaide Oval	24–25, 27–30 November 1899	Victoria won by 246 runs	
1899–00	Queensland v New South Wales	Brisbane Cricket Ground	25, 27–28 November 1899	New South Wales won by an innings and 85 runs	
1899–00	South Australia v New South Wales	Adelaide Oval	16, 18–20 December 1899	New South Wales won by an innings and 392 runs	
1899–00	Victoria v New South Wales	Melbourne Cricket Ground	23, 26–28 December 1899	New South Wales won by an innings and 274 runs	
1899–00	Victoria v South Australia	Melbourne Cricket Ground	30 December 1899, 1–4 January 1900	Victoria won by 181 runs	
1899–00	Tasmania v New South Wales	Tasmania Cricket Association Ground, Hobart	30 December 1899, 1–2 January 1900	New South Wales won by 4 wickets	
1899–00	New South Wales v South Australia	Sydney Cricket Ground	6, 8–12 January 1900	South Australia won by 6 wickets	
1899–00	New South Wales v Victoria	Sydney Cricket Ground	26–27, 29–31 January 1900	New South Wales won by 111 runs	
1899–00	Victoria v Tasmania	Melbourne Cricket Ground	26–27, 29–30 January 1900	Victoria won by 185 runs	
1899–00	Australian XI v Rest of Australia	Sydney Cricket Ground	2–3, 5–6 February 1900	Australian XI won by 151 runs	

Key

Sheffield Shield matches

== See also ==
- Sheffield Shield
- Intercolonial cricket in Australia
