= Frederick Marsden (disambiguation) =

Frederick or Fred Marsden may refer to:

- Frederick Marsden (1819-1870), Australian cricketer
- Fred Marsden (1842-1888), American playwright
- Fred Marsden (footballer) (1911-1989), English footballer, see List of AFC Bournemouth players
