= John Tabart =

English cricketer

Personal information
- Full name: John Lewis Benjamin Tabart
- Born: 30 November 1827; St Pancras, London, England
- Died: 9 September 1894 (aged 66); Launceston, Tasmania, Australia
- Relatives: Tom Tabart (nephew)

Domestic team information
- Years: Team
- 1850/51-1857/58: Tasmania
- First-class debut: 11-12 Feb 1851 Tasmania v Victoria
- Last First-class: 4-5 March 1858 Tasmania v Victoria

Career statistics
Competition	First-class
Matches	5
Runs scored	80
Batting average	11.42
100s/50s	–/–
Top score	20
Balls bowled	4
Wickets	–
Bowling average	–
5 wickets in innings	–
10 wickets in match	–
Best bowling	–
Catches/stumpings	1/–
- Source: Cricinfo, 2 January 2011

John Lewis Benjamin Tabart (30 November 1827 – 9 September 1894), was an English cricket player, who played five games of first-class cricket for Tasmania.

He has the distinction of having played in the first ever first-class cricket match in Australia. In the extremely low-scoring match, his attacking 15 not out in the second innings, after Tasmania had lost six wickets for 15 in pursuit of 36 for victory, was crucial.

John Tabart died on 9 September 1894 in Launceston, Tasmania at the age of 66.

== See also ==
- List of Tasmanian representative cricketers
