= George Gibson (Tasmania cricketer) =

Australian cricketer

Personal information
- Full name: George Gibson
- Born: 15 October 1827 (christened); Norfolk Plains, Tasmania, Australia
- Died: 8 October 1873 (aged 45); Sandy Bay, Tasmania, Australia
- Relatives: George Herbert Bailey (son-in-law)

Domestic team information
- Years: Team
- 1850–58: Tasmania
- First-class debut: 11 February 1851 Tasmania v Victoria
- Last First-class: 25 February 1858 Tasmania v Victoria

Career statistics
Competition	First-class
Matches	3
Runs scored	12
Batting average	2.40
100s/50s	0/0
Top score	8
Catches/stumpings	0/–
- Source: CricketArchive, 15 August 2010

George Gibson (christened 15 October 1827, died 8 October 1873) was an Australian first-class cricketer, who played three games for Tasmania over an 8-year period. He has the distinction of having participated in the first ever first-class cricket match in Australia.

He was elected unopposed to the Tasmanian House of Assembly as the member for Ringwood on 3 October 1866 and resigned in June 1869. He and his brothers were renowned sheep breeders.

Gibson died in Sandy Bay, Tasmania on 8 October 1873, aged 45.

== See also ==
- List of Tasmanian representative cricketers
