= Walter Westbrook =

Australian cricketer

Personal information
- Born: 21 November 1827; Hobart, Van Diemen's Land
- Died: 3 January 1897 (aged 69); Launceston, Tasmania, Australia
- Batting: Right-handed

Domestic team information
- Years: Team
- Tasmania

Career statistics
Competition	First-class
Matches	2
Runs scored	15
Batting average	5.00
100s/50s	0/0
Top score	10
Catches/stumpings	1/0
- Source: CricInfo, 24 March 2007

Walter Horatio Westbrook (21 November 1827 – 3 January 1897) was an Australian cricketer, who played two first-class cricket matches for Tasmania.

He has the distinction of having played in the first ever first-class cricket match in Australia.

Walter Westbrook died on 3 January 1897 in Launceston, Tasmania at the age of 69.
