= George Maddox (cricketer) =

Australian cricketer

Personal information
- Born: c. 1811; Ireland
- Died: 7 July 1867
- Batting: Right-handed
- Bowling: Right-arm off break

Domestic team information
- Years: Team
- 1850/51–1857/58: Tasmania

Career statistics
Competition	First-class
Matches	4
Runs scored	29
Batting average	4.83
100s/50s	–/–
Top score	14
Balls bowled	73
Wickets	2
Bowling average	20.50
5 wickets in innings	–
10 wickets in match	–
Best bowling	1/16
Catches/stumpings	2/–
- Source: Cricinfo, 2 January 2011

George Maddox (born c. 1811 in Ireland), was an Australian cricket player, who played four games for Tasmania.

He has the distinction of having participated in the first ever first-class cricket match in Australia. Maddox's catch to dismiss the Victorian batsman W. Philpott for 17, off the bowling of Robert McDowell, was the first-ever catch in first-class cricket in Australia.

George Maddox died on 7 July 1867 in Melbourne, Victoria at the age of 56.

== See also ==
- List of Tasmanian representative cricketers
