= Tom Tabart =

Australian cricketer

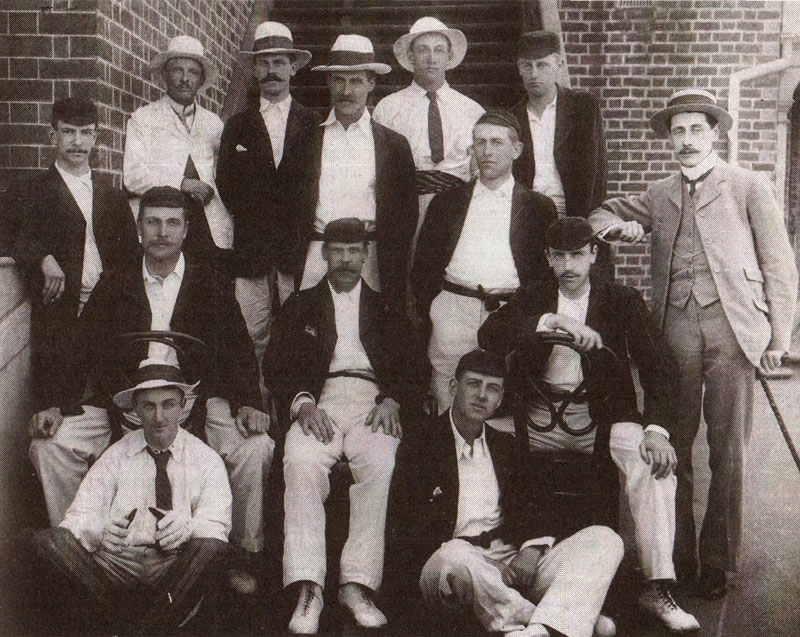
- The Tasmanian cricket team that beat Victoria at the MCG in 1902-03. Tom Tabart is seated on the ground on the right.

Personal information
- Full name: Thomas Alfred Tabart
- Born: 10 August 1877; Campbell Town, Tasmania, Australia
- Died: 29 August 1950 (aged 73); East Melbourne, Victoria, Australia
- Role: Batsman

Domestic team information
- Years: Team
- 1896/97–1908/09: Tasmania

Career statistics
Competition	First-class
Matches	10
Runs scored	430
Batting average	21.50
100s/50s	0/2
Top score	57
Balls bowled	231
Wickets	4
Bowling average	46.25
5 wickets in innings	0
10 wickets in match	0
Best bowling	3/46
Catches/stumpings	13/–
- Source: Cricinfo, 3 August 2013

Thomas Alfred Tabart (10 August 1877 – 29 August 1950) was a cricketer who played first-class cricket for Tasmania from 1897 until 1909.

== Career ==
A "vigorous batsman and safe slip fieldsman", Tabart made his first-class debut in 1896–97. He played his first innings of note in 1902–03 when he batted at number six and top-scored with 43 in Tasmania's second innings against Victoria at the MCG. Tasmania won by 57 runs.

Against New South Wales in Hobart in 1904–05 he made Tasmania's top score in the match when he scored 48 in the second innings, adding 83 for the first wicket with Ossie Douglas and giving Charles Eady and Edward Windsor the chance to bowl New South Wales out for another Tasmanian victory.

Tabart's best performances came in two matches against the MCC in January 1908 as an opening batsman. In the first match, in Launceston, he top-scored in the first innings with 57, and took three wickets in the MCC first innings, including that of Jack Hobbs, Tabart's second wicket in first-class cricket. In the second match, in Hobart a few days later, he made his only other first-class fifty, 55 in the second innings, to help Tasmania hold out for a draw.

He captained Tasmania in his final first-class match, against Victoria in Hobart in 1908–09, scoring 22 and 38 in a match that Victoria won by four wickets.

Tabart played regularly in the biannual intrastate matches in Tasmania between North and South: for the South team from 1896–97 to 1897–98, for North in 1902–03, and for South again from 1903–04 to 1908–09, captaining South in his last match. In the 1903–04 match in Hobart he scored 130 in the second innings and took five catches in the match.

Tabart was secretary of the Tasmanian Racing Club from 1903 to 1925, then moved to Melbourne and became secretary of the Victorian Amateur Turf Club. He and his wife Josephine had a son and a daughter.

Although he did not meet the stated criteria for notability, Tabart's date of birth (given as 1879) appeared in the Births and Deaths section of Wisden up to and including the 1974 edition; his death was never acknowledged.

Tabart's uncle, John Tabart, played for Tasmania in what is now considered to be the first first-class cricket match in Australia, in 1850–51.
