= Colin Hodgkinson (RAF officer) =

Pilot in World War II (1920–1996)

- Born: 11 February 1920; Wells, Somerset
- Died: 13 September 1996 (aged 76); Dordogne, France
- Relatives: G. Hodgkinson (father)
- Military career
- Allegiance: United Kingdom
- Branch: Royal Air Force
- Service years: 1938–1946; 1949–1950s
- Rank: Flight lieutenant
- Nicknames: Hoppy; The poor man's Bader
- Service number: 4253756
- Conflicts: Second World War: Channel Front (POW)
- Awards: 1939–1945 Star; Air Crew Europe Star; Defence Medal

Flight Lieutenant Colin Gerald Shaw Hodgkinson (11 February 1920 – 13 September 1996) was a Royal Air Force (RAF) pilot during the Second World War. His is credited with 2 aerial victories.

== Early life ==
Colin Hodgkinson was born on 11 February 1920 at Glencot House near Wookey Hole in Somerset. His father was the first-class cricketer and airman Gerard Hodgkinson. Considered a "difficult and unruly" child, he was sent to Pangbourne College for a nautical cadetship. In 1938, aged 18, he was accepted into the Fleet Air Arm to undergo pilot training as a midshipman.

== Training and accident ==
Hodgkinson carried out training aboard the aircraft carrier HMS Courageous in the De Havilland Tiger Moth. He had completed some 20 hours of flying, including solo flights.

On 12 May 1939 he was practising blind flying at RAF Gravesend, with a hood over his head. At an altitude of 800 feet his Tiger Moth struck another aircraft and plummeted to the ground. The crash killed his 28-year-old trainer, Fg Off John Fyrley Spanton, and seriously injured Hodgkinson. He was rushed to hospital, where his right leg was amputated above the knee and his left leg below the knee. He was transferred to the Royal Naval Hospital in Chatham to recover. During this period he was introduced to the surgeon Archibald McIndoe, who convinced him to have plastic surgery on his burned face, so making him a member of McIndoe's "Guinea Pig Club".

By Christmas 1940, just over a year after his accident, he was walking on artificial limbs to such a standard that he was allowed back into the air. He subsequently joined the Royal Naval Volunteer Reserve and went on numerous flights, including as a rear gunner on a bomber.

== Royal Air Force service ==
Hodgkinson was determined to pilot aircraft again. He was sure he could emulate his fellow double-amputee Douglas Bader and fly Spitfires given the chance. In September 1942 he successfully requested to transfer to the Royal Air Force as a Pilot Officer and took control of his first Spitfire by the end of the month. After training he was posted to No. 131 Squadron RAF.

His first aerial victory was claimed in April 1943, when on combat patrol on the south-east coast of England. He spotted four Focke-Wulf Fw 190s bombing the town of Brighton. Engaging them, he managed to disable one, which crashed into the sea near to Brighton Palace Pier.

Later in the year he was promoted to Flying Officer and posted to No. 611 Squadron RAF. In August 1943 was escorting American B-26 Marauders home from a bombing run on Bernay Airfield in southwest France. The formation came under attack from more than 50 Fw 190s. In the ensuing dogfight he claimed his second aerial victory.

== Second accident and capture in France ==
F/O Hodgkinson was then posted to No. 501 Squadron RAF as Flight commander. On 24 November 1943, during a high-altitude weather reconnaissance mission from 11.50, in Amiens area his oxygen supply failed 6 m E. of Hardelot, causing him to crash land in a field. He was dragged from his burning Spitfire by two farm workers, losing an artificial leg in the process. For the next 10 months he was held in Stalag Luft III prisoner-of-war camp, before being repatriated and deemed "no further use to his country". He was again treated by McIndoe and he continued to fly until his release from service in 1946.

== Post-war ==
Three years later Hodgkinson re-joined the RAF as a Royal Auxiliary Air Force pilot with both No. 501 Squadron RAF and No. 604 Squadron RAF. These squadrons were converting to jet-engined aircraft, and Hodgkinson flew the de Havilland Vampire until the early 1950s.

He moved to Worminghall in Buckinghamshire into what he described as two rambling thatched cottages known as Nutkin Thatch, and subsequently worked in public relations. In the 1955 General Election he stood as the Conservative Party candidate for South West Islington, ultimately losing to Labour.

In 1957 he published his autobiography, Best Foot Forward.

He was the subject of This Is Your Life in 1957 when he was surprised by Eamonn Andrews in a pub near to the BBC Television Theatre.

== Death ==
Hodgkinson permanently moved to his holiday home in Dordogne, France, a popular place among British immigrants, in 1986. He died there on 13 September 1996, aged 76.

== Bibliography ==
- Hodgkinson, Colin (1957). Best Foot Forward. London: Odhams. ISBN 0552106879.
