= Gervase Du Croz =

Australian cricketer

Gervase du Croz
Personal information
- Full name: Gervase Bedford du Croz
- Born: c. 1820; London, England
- Died: 19 February 1855 (aged 35); Launceston, Tasmania, Australia

Domestic team information
- Years: Team
- 1850/51: Tasmania
- 1853/54: Victoria
- FC debut: 11 February 1851 Tasmania v Victoria
- Last FC: 3 March 1854 Victoria v Tasmania

Career statistics
Competition	First-class
Matches	2
Runs scored	45
Batting average	11.25
100s/50s	0/0
Top score	27
Catches/stumpings	0/–
- Source: Cricinfo, 2 January 2011

Gervase Bedford Du Croz (c. 1820 – 19 February 1855) was an Australian cricket player, who played one game each for both Tasmania, and Victoria.

He has the distinction of having participated in the first ever first-class cricket match in Australia, in which he opened the batting for Tasmania.

Du Croz died on 19 February 1855, in Launceston, Tasmania aged 35.
