= Robert McDowall =

Scottish-born Australian cricketer

Personal information
- Full name: Robert Murray McDowall
- Born: 21 November 1821; Edinburgh, Midlothian, Scotland
- Died: 5 November 1894 (aged 72); New Zealand
- Bowling: Underarm

Domestic team information
- Years: Team
- 1850/51 – 1853/54: Tasmania
- First-class debut: 11-12 February 1851 Tasmania v Victoria
- Last First-class: 3-4 March 1854 Tasmania v Victoria

Career statistics
Competition	FC
Matches	2
Runs scored	15
Batting average	7.50
100s/50s	–/–
Top score	11
Balls bowled	172
Wickets	16
Bowling average	6.50
5 wickets in innings	2
10 wickets in match	–
Best bowling	5/23
Catches/stumpings	1/–
- Source: Cricinfo, 4 January 2011

Robert Murray McDowall (21 November 1821 – 5 November 1894), was a Scottish-born Australian cricketer who played two first-class cricket matches for Tasmania. He was born in Edinburgh, Scotland.

He has the distinction of having played in the first ever first-class cricket match in Australia. When McDowall bowled Duncan Cooper for 4 in Victoria's first innings, he took the first-ever first-class wicket claimed in Australia. McDowall went on to take 5/27 in the first innings, making him the first man to take a 5 wicket haul in Australian first class cricket history.

== See also ==
- List of Tasmanian representative cricketers
