= James Brodie (Australian cricketer) =

Australian cricketer (1820–1912)

Personal information
- Full name: James Charles Brodie
- Born: 31 August 1820; Perth, Scotland
- Died: 19 February 1912 (aged 91); Balwyn, Victoria, Australia

Domestic team information
- Years: Team
- 1850/51–1860/61: Victoria
- First-class debut: 11–12 February 1851 Victoria v Tasmania
- Last First-class: 14–16 February 1861 Victoria v New South Wales

Career statistics
Competition	First-class
Matches	3
Runs scored	43
Batting average	7.16
100s/50s	0/0
Top score	17
Balls bowled	32
Wickets	1
Bowling average	15.00
5 wickets in innings	0
10 wickets in match	0
Best bowling	1/13
Catches/stumpings	0/–
- Source: Cricinfo, 15 January 2015

James Brodie (31 August 1820 – 19 February 1912) was an Australian cricketer. He played three first-class cricket matches for Victoria.

In 1851 Brodie played in the first inter-colonial cricket match in Australia, representing Victoria against Tasmania in Launceston and equal-top-scoring in the first innings with 17. He was among the first cricketers to play in first-class matches between Victoria and New South Wales, having personally read the proclamation separating the states in 1852. In 1862 he represented Australia in a match against the first English XI to tour the country.

By the 1880s Brodie had moved to River Murray, South Australia, where he was growing willows. As of 1882 he had moved to Port Augusta where he patented a spring-handle cricket bat. At some point he returned to Victoria where he regularly attended matches at the Melbourne Cricket Ground well into his old age. He was reportedly the oldest Australian cricketer at the time of his passing in 1912.
