= William Field (cricketer) =

Australian cricketer

Personal information
- Full name: William Field
- Born: 17 March 1816; Port Dalrymple, Tasmania, Australia
- Died: 22 June 1890 (aged 74); Bishopsbourne, Tasmania, Australia

Domestic team information
- Years: Team
- 1851: Tasmania
- Only First-class: 11 February 1851 Tasmania v Victoria

Career statistics
Competition	First-class
Matches	1
Runs scored	1
Batting average	0.5
100s/50s	0/0
Top score	1
Balls bowled	12
Wickets	1
Bowling average	9.00
5 wickets in innings	0
10 wickets in match	0
Best bowling	1/9
Catches/stumpings	0/–
- Source: CricketArchive, 5 January 2011

William Field (17 March 1816 – 22 June 1890) was an Australian cricketer, who played one game for Tasmania.

Field was born in Port Dalrymple, Tasmania. He has the distinction of having participated in the first ever first-class match in Australia, in which he failed to make an impact.

Field died on 22 June 1890, in Bishopsbourne, Tasmania at the age of 74.

== See also ==
- List of Tasmanian representative cricketers
