= Alfred Thomson (cricketer) =

Australian cricketer

Personal information
- Died: 12 October 1895; Paddington, London, England

Domestic team information
- Years: Team
- 1851-1854: Victoria
- Source: Cricinfo, 15 January 2015

Alfred Taddy Thomson (date of birth unknown, died 12 October 1895) was an Australian cricketer. He played two first-class cricket matches for Victoria. He also acted as the agent for the National Gallery of Victoria, and as the art agent of the colony, in England.

== See also ==
- List of Victoria first-class cricketers
