= Melmoth Hall =

Australian cricketer

Personal information
- Born: 26 April 1811; Horringer, Suffolk, England
- Died: 4 October 1885 (aged 74); Ashfield, New South Wales, Australia

Domestic team information
- Years: Team
- 1851-1854: Victoria
- Source: Cricinfo, 15 January 2015

Melmoth Hall (26 April 1811 – 4 October 1885) was an Australian cricketer. He played two first-class cricket matches for Victoria.

In his professional career Hall was involved in agriculture and he moved to India after his cricket career where he farmed indigo and sugar. He returned to Australia in 1868, and began working for the Colonial Sugar Company giving talks on sugar-growing to farmers operating near Chatsworth on the Clarence River. He also contributed academic papers on the subject to journals. He retired in 1881 when his health began to fail and received a pension from the company. He died in 1885 after a period of illness.

== See also ==
- List of Victoria first-class cricketers
