= Lower Domain Ground =

Former cricket venue in Tasmania, Australia

Ground information
- Location: Hobart, Australia
- Country: Australia
- Establishment: 1835 (first recorded match)

Team information
Tasmania	(1858)
- As of 21 October 2011; Source: Ground profile

Lower Domain Ground (also known as the Association Ground) was a cricket ground in Hobart, Tasmania, Australia. The first recorded match held on the ground came in 1835 when Hobart Town played United Services. The ground held a single first-class match in 1858 when Tasmania played Victoria, which in a 69 run victory for Victoria. The last recorded match on the ground was between Southern Tasmania Cricket Association and the Australians. The ground is now defunct as a cricket venue.
