= South Launceston Cricket Club =

- Founded: 1907
- League: Cricket North (Formerly N.T.C.A)
- Based in: Launceston, Tasmania
- Home ground: NTCA Ground No. 2
- Colours: Green and Gold
- President: Jeremy Jackson
- Head coach: Nathan Phillip
- Captain: Jeremy Jackson
- NTCA Titles: 1908–1909, 1914–1915, 1929–1930, 1936–1937, 1937–1938, 1938–1939, 1940–1941, 1949–1950, 1965–1966, 1967–1968, 1987–1988, 2003–2004, 2012–13, 2016-2017, 2017-2018
- Mascot: The Knights
- 2020–21: 1st Grade: 4th Women: Premiers
- Website: www.slcc.com.au

The South Launceston Cricket Club (SLCC), is a cricket team which represents South Launceston in the Cricket North grade cricket competition, in the Australian state of Tasmania.

The South Launceston Cricket Club was formed in 1907 when the Northern Tasmanian Cricket Association made changes to the district cricket competition. The city was divided into zones and players had to represent the club whose zone they lived in. This was an Australia-wide movement aimed at creating a more even grade cricket competition and generate suburban loyalty and rivalry. South Launceston joined North, East, West and Central Launceston in the new NTCA district competition for the 1907-08 season.

South has won a total of 15 premierships. In the period between 1936 and 1941 the club won 4 NTCA premierships and 2 state premierships. The most recent A Grade premiership was in 2017-2018.

The club has at times suffered financial setbacks, especially around the time of World War II, and the club was threatened with expulsion form the NTCA due to non-payment of fees. It survived thanks to the committeemen of the club who gave their personal guarantees to cover any outstanding debts, and eventually the debts were cleared.

In more recent times, the club has experienced an era of success, with the Men's First Grade side regularly competing in finals and grand finals, and the Women's First Grade team winning their 6th consecutive premiership in 2020-21. Participation numbers are also at an all time high, with the club recently fielding 3x third grade teams in 2020-21, to accompany their first and second grade men's teams.

Notable overseas players include Jack "Flatjack" Simmons (also captained Tasmania) and Andrew Hayhurst of the UK. With a strong history as a breeding ground for representative cricketers, the twohighest profile South Launceston products are Shaun Young and George Bailey.

== Honours ==
NTCA Premierships:

1st Grade: 1908-09, 1914–15, 1929–30, 1936–37, 1937–38, 1938–39, 1940–41, 1949–50, 1965–66, 1967–68, 1987–88, 2003–04, 2012–13, 2016–17, 2017–18

2nd Grade: 1966-67, 1967–68, 2009–10, 2011–12, 2013–14, 2015–16

3rd Grade: 1981-82, 1987–88, 1990–91, 1995–96, 2012–13, 2015–16

4th Grade: 2015-16

Women's: 2015-16, 2016–17, 2017–18, 2018–19, 2019–20, 2020–21

== See also ==
- Cricket Tasmania
