= Edward Antill =

Edward Antill may refer to:

- Edward Antill (attorney) (1658–1725), English-born New York City merchant and attorney
- Edward Antill (colonial politician) (1701–1770), his son, New Jersey plantation owner, winemaker, and political figure
- Edward Antill (soldier) (1742–1789), his son, Continental Army Lieutenant Colonel noted for his service in the Battle of Quebec (1775)
