= William Philpott =

Australian cricketer

Personal information
- Born: 24 January 1819; West Farleigh, Kent, England
- Died: 4 November 1891 (aged 72); Linton, Kent, England

Domestic team information
- Years: Team
- 1850/51-1855/56: Victoria
- First-class debut: 11-12 February 1851 Victoria v Tasmania
- Last First-class: 26-27 March 1856 Victoria v New South Wales

Career statistics
Competition	First-class
Matches	2
Runs scored	36
Batting average	9.00
100s/50s	0/0
Top score	17
Catches/stumpings	0/-
- Source: Cricinfo, 15 January 2015

William Philpott (24 January 1819 – 4 November 1891) was an Australian cricketer. He played two first-class cricket matches for Victoria. Philpott holds the distinction for having been the captain of the Victorian cricket team for the first ever first-class cricket match played in Australia, from 11 February 1851 to 12 February 1851. This match was also the first intercolonial match played in Australia. The match was played against Tasmania, which eventually won the timeless match after two-days of play. Thus, Philpott became the first ever losing captain in first-class cricket in Australia.

== See also ==
- List of Victoria first-class cricketers
