= Charles Lister =

Australian cricketer

Personal information
- Born: 7 November 1811; Armitage Park, Staffordshire, England
- Died: 18 August 1873 (aged 61); Laverstock Asylum, Wiltshire, England

Domestic team information
- Years: Team
- 1851-1852: Victoria
- Source: Cricinfo, 15 January 2015

Charles Lister (7 November 1811 – 18 August 1873) was an English dandy and civil servant, who encountered money troubles from around age 30. He was later cricketer in Australia.

== Life ==
He was the youngest son of Thomas Lister of Armitage Park in Staffordshire, England, and his second wife Mary Grove, daughter of William Grove (1702–1767) MP; Thomas Henry Lister was an older half-brother. He was educated at Shrewsbury School from 1825 to 1830.

Lister matriculated at Balliol College, Oxford in 1831. His niece Adelaide Lister Drummond described him in his Oxford days:

"... indeed, a very attractive person at this time. He was dressed in the extreme of fashion—yellow nankeen waistcoat and continuations, a coat of aggressive spring green, very short in the waist;— in short, a finished dandy of that day, when D'Orsay flourished and Beau Brummel was not forgotten.

Lister married in 1834 Mary Stephens, daughter of William Stephens, and they had four daughters. His sister Adelaide married firstly Thomas Lister, 2nd Baron Ribblesdale (died 1832); and then, secondly, in 1835, Lord John Russell, who that year became Home Secretary. Russell in 1836 gave Lister a clerkship in the Home Department, where in 1840 he worked in the Secretary of State's Office. In 1841 Lister, then of Fyfield, was declared an insolvent debtor, having lived in a number of residences, including Boulogne in 1839–1840.

In a court case of 1855, it was mentioned in evidence from Richard Gosling of the bank Gosling & Sharp that Charles Lister, who had been "unfortunate", brought cheques from Edward Hartopp Cradock to the bank, up to some five years earlier. Cradock was the husband of Harriet Cradock, third child of Thomas Lister and Mary Grove.

Lister died at Laverstock, Wiltshire on 18 August 1873.

== Cricket ==
Lister played two first-class cricket matches for Victoria, in 1851–2.

== See also ==
- List of Victoria first-class cricketers
