= William Henty =

Australian politician

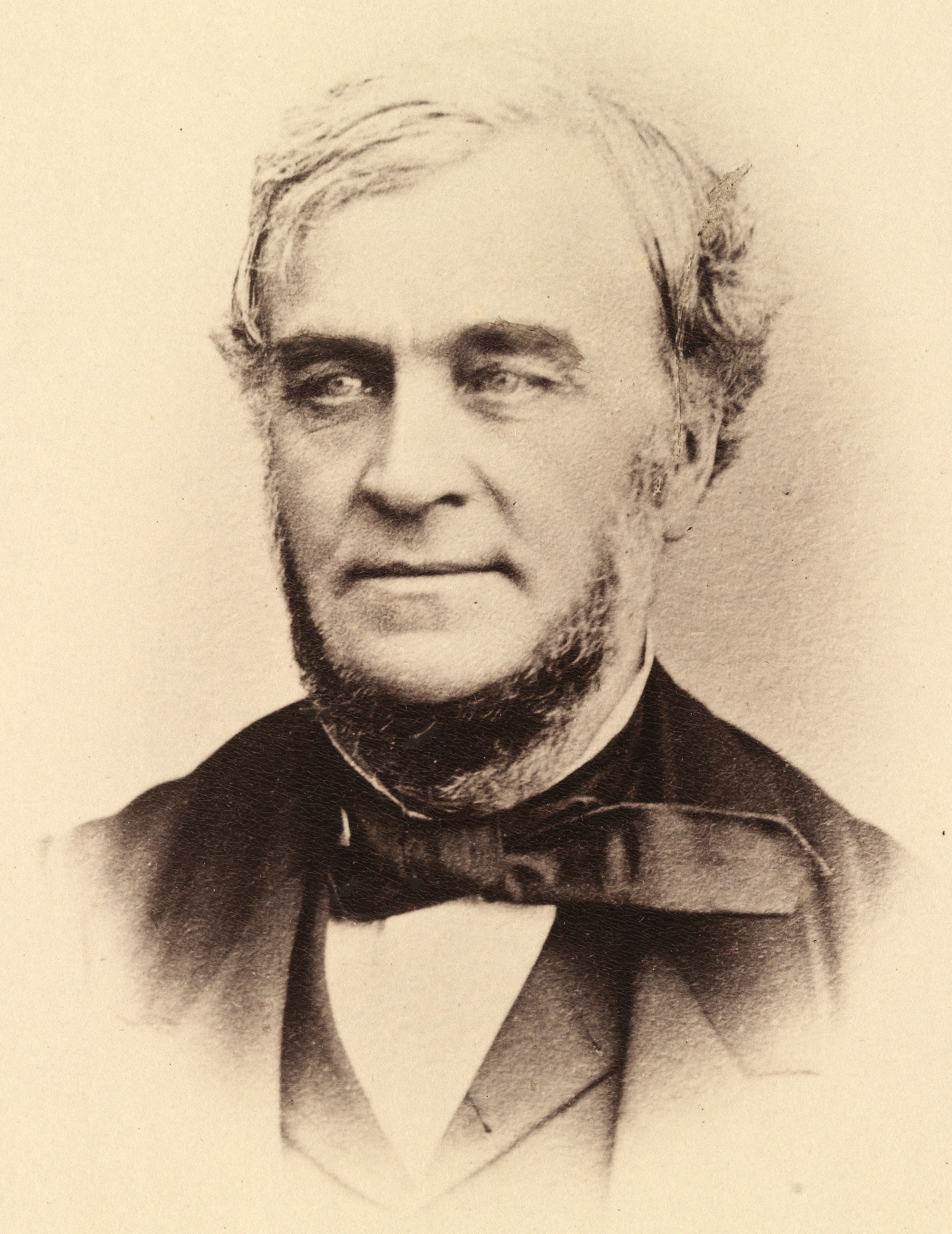

Personal information
- Full name: William Henty
- Born: 23 September 1808; West Tarring, Sussex, England
- Died: 11 July 1881 (aged 72); Hove, Sussex, England
- Bowling: underarm

Domestic team information
- Years: Team
- 1851–52: Tasmania
- First-class debut: 11 February 1851 Tasmania v Victoria
- Last First-class: 29 March 1852 Tasmania v Victoria

Career statistics
Competition	First-class
Matches	2
Runs scored	1
Batting average	0.33
100s/50s	0/0
Top score	1
Balls bowled	224
Wickets	19
Bowling average	9.36
5 wickets in innings	2
10 wickets in match	1
Best bowling	6/40
Catches/stumpings	1/–
- Source: , 5 January 2011

William Henty (23 September 1808 in West Tarring, Sussex, England – 11 July 1881 in Hove, Sussex, England). He moved to Van Diemen's Land in 1837 and for over 20 years practised as a solicitor. In 1857 he was elected a member of the legislative council for Tamar and was colonial secretary in the Weston cabinet. He held this office for five and a half years until his resignation in 1862.

He was also an Australian cricketer, who played two games for Tasmania in 1851. He has the distinction of having participated in the first ever first-class cricket match in Australia, and having bowled the first ever ball in a first class cricket match in Australia. He opened the bowling for Tasmania in both innings, bowling right arm underarm, and took 4/52, and 5/26 for 9/78 for the match.

He returned to England in 1862, where he remained until his death on 11 July 1881 in Hove, Sussex, England at the age of 72.

He was interested in Shakespeare and after his death a small volume by him, Shakespeare with some Notes on his early Biography, was printed for private circulation. This has little value but contains a memoir of the author by R. Harrison.

== See also ==
- List of Tasmanian representative cricketers
- Henty Brothers

== Notes ==
Tasmanian Legislative Council
New seat	Member for Tamar; 1856–1862; Served alongside: William Button	Succeeded by Sir Richard Dry
