= Richard Philpott =

English cricketer

Richard Philpott (7 February 1813 – 8 June 1888) was an English cricketer who played for Victoria, Australia. He was born in West Farleigh and died in Brenchley.

Philpott made a single first-class appearance for the side, during the 1850–51 season, against Tasmania. From the middle order, he scored 12 runs in the first innings in which he batted, and a single run in the second.
