= Launceston Cricket Club =

City cricket team of Launceston

- Founded: 1841
- Based in: Launceston
- Home ground: North Tasmania Cricket Association Ground
- Colours: Red & Green
- Head coach: Jade Selby
- Captain: Will Bennett
- NTCA Titles: 1887–88, 1892–93, 1899–1900, 1901–02, 1902–03, 1917–18, 1919–20, 1920–21, 1921–22, 1925–26, 1927–28, 1928–29, 1930–31, 1933–34, 1934–35, 1941–42, 1945–46, 1946–47, 1958–59, 1959–60, 1962–63, 1963–64, 1968–69, 1970–71, 1972–73, 1978–79, 1982–83, 1983–84, 1984–85, 1985–86, 1988–89, 1989–90, 1990–91, 1991–92, 1992–93, 1993–94, 1995–96, 1996–97, 1997–98, 1999–00, 2000–01, 2001–02, 2002–03, 2004–05, 2005–06, 2010–11, 2020–21
- 2023–24: 1st Grade - 4th 2nd Grade - 4th 3rd Grade - 5th 4th Grade - 5th Female 1st Grade - 3rd Over 40's - 3rd Under 16's - 6th

Launceston Cricket Club (LCC) is a cricket team which represents the city of Launceston in the Northern Tasmanian Cricket Association grade cricket competition. The club was founded in 1841, making it the second-oldest cricket club in Tasmania and in Australia.

LCC beat Derwent Cricket Club by 12 runs in the first-ever "north v south" match in 1850, and on 11 February and 12 February 1851, they played against Melbourne Cricket Club in Launceston, in what is now recorded as the first ever first-class cricket match in Australia. By 1874 the LCC had organised the first ever "All-England XI" vs "Tasmania" game in Launceston on 24 February.

In 1878 LCC player, George Bailey was selected to join the Australian cricket team on their tour to England, and became the first Tasmanian to play for Australia.

The club took possession of the NTCA Ground, then known as the "Launceston Cricket Ground" in 1886 upon the formation of the NTCA. At the time, the club colours were listed as Green and Yellow. The following year LCC won the inaugural NTCA premiership.

From 1907 until 1914 the club was in recess due to political bickering and reorganisation of the NTCA and northern district cricket competitions. The club was reformed in 1914 with changed colours of Oxford Blue only to have the league suspended for the outbreak of World War I. However, the club properly returned to the NTCA in 1918 by winning the premiership again.

The club won three premierships in a row by 1922 but again went into recess due to another period of district cricket from 1935–36 to 1940–41.

Launceston Cricket Club and East Launceston Cricket Club merged in 1941 before rejoining the NTCA competition. At this time, the club also adopted their current club colours of red and green.

In 1968 club legend Ron 'Rocky' Dean retired from Tasmanian Grade Cricket with a remarkable career haul of 901 wickets.

In 1975 LCC won their first Kookaburra Cup, and in 1978, LCC player, Bruce Doolan faces Tasmania's first ball in their debut Sheffield Shield match. 1979 saw the club win three Kookaburra Cups in a row.

The 1981–82 season saw LCC amass a then-competition record of 7/527 in the NTCA final. From the 1982–83 season until 1985–86 the club won every NTCA premiership, a remarkable 4 in a row.

In the 1983–84 season David Boon became the first Launceston Cricket Club player to be selected to play for Australia, and in 1991 he was honoured to unveil a plaque at the NTCA ground commemorating the club's 150th anniversary.

From 1988–89 until 1993–94 LCC won an incredible 6 Consecutive NTCA Premierships, which is both an NTCA and State Record, including a record innings and 150 runs victory over rivals South Launceston Cricket Club in the 1994 final.

The 1998 NTCA final between LCC and Mowbray Cricket Club proved to be one of the most remarkable games of cricket in Tasmanian history. Mowbray amassed an incredible record of 7/542, in doing so breaking Launceston's record from 1982. Even more incredibly, the following week in reply LCC made 6/545 to win the game by 4 wickets and break the record again. Club legend Richard 'Joey' Bennett retired with a club record 8640 runs to his name.

The following Grand Final between LCC and Riverside Cricket Club proved to match the previous years when on the last day, Riverside were cruising to a comfortable victory until the last hour of the match when LCC took six wickets, including two in the second last over from 16-year-old Xavier Doherty to win the game

In 1999, Australian cricket legend David Boon played his last ever match for Launceston CC, and the following year 4 LCC players were named in the NTCA "team of the century".

The 2020–21 season saw the club complete a clean sweep of the men's competition, winning the First, Second and Third Grade competitions.

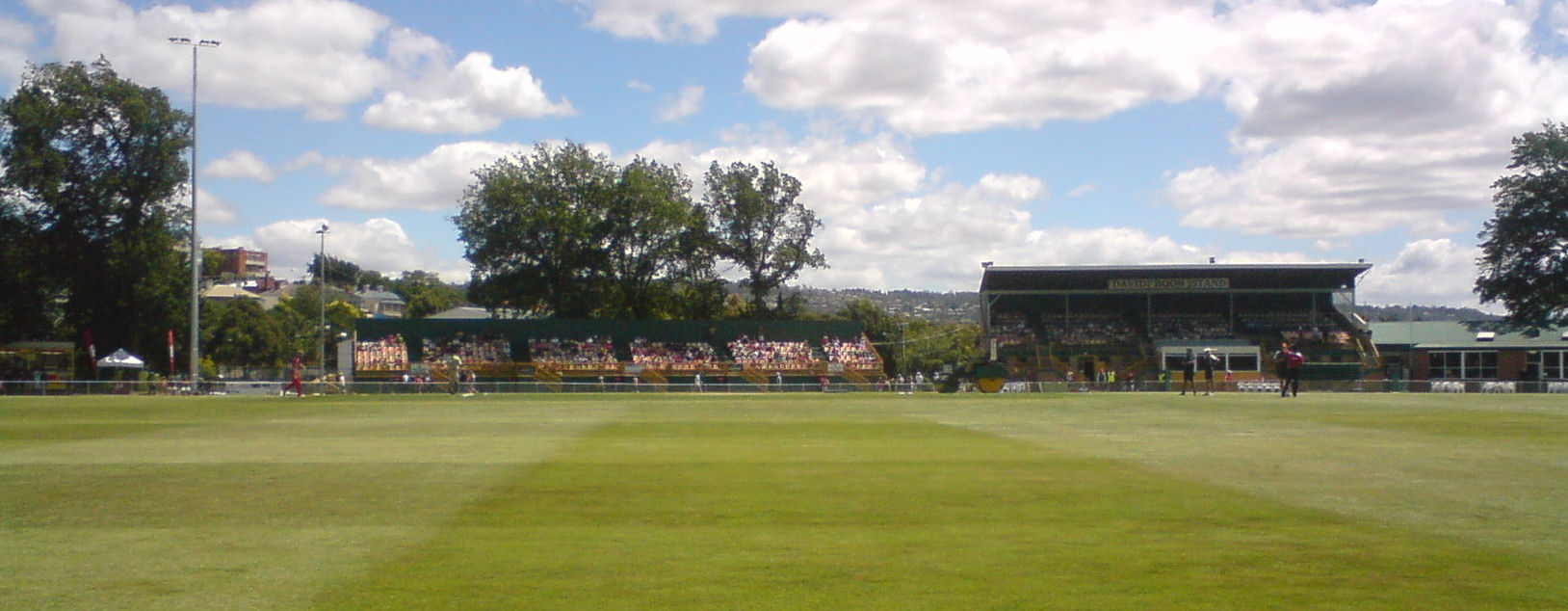
Boon Stand at NTCA Ground

== Honours ==
NTCA Premierships: 1887–88, 1892–93, 1899–1900, 1901–02, 1902–03, 1917–18, 1919–20, 1920–21, 1921–22, 1925–26, 1927–28, 1928–29, 1930–31, 1933–34, 1934–35, 1941–42, 1945–46, 1946–47, 1958–59, 1959–60, 1962–63, 1963–64, 1968–69, 1970–71, 1972–73, 1978–79, 1982–83, 1983–84, 1984–85, 1985–86, 1988–89, 1989–90, 1990–91, 1991–92, 1992–93, 1993–94, 1995–96, 1996–97, 1997–98, 1999–00, 2000–01, 2001–02, 2002–03, 2004–05, 2005–06, 2010–11, 2020–21.
