= Frederick Marsden =

Australian cricketer

Personal information
- Born: 1819; Lewisham, London, England
- Died: 1870 (aged 50–51); Fitzroy, Melbourne, Australia

Domestic team information
- Years: Team
- 1851–1852: Victoria
- Source: Cricinfo, 15 January 2015

Frederick Marsden (1819 – 20 March 1870) was an Australian cricketer. He played two first-class cricket matches for Victoria.

== See also ==
- List of Victoria first-class cricketers
