= Emerald Hill Cricket Ground =

Cricket ground in Melbourne, Australia

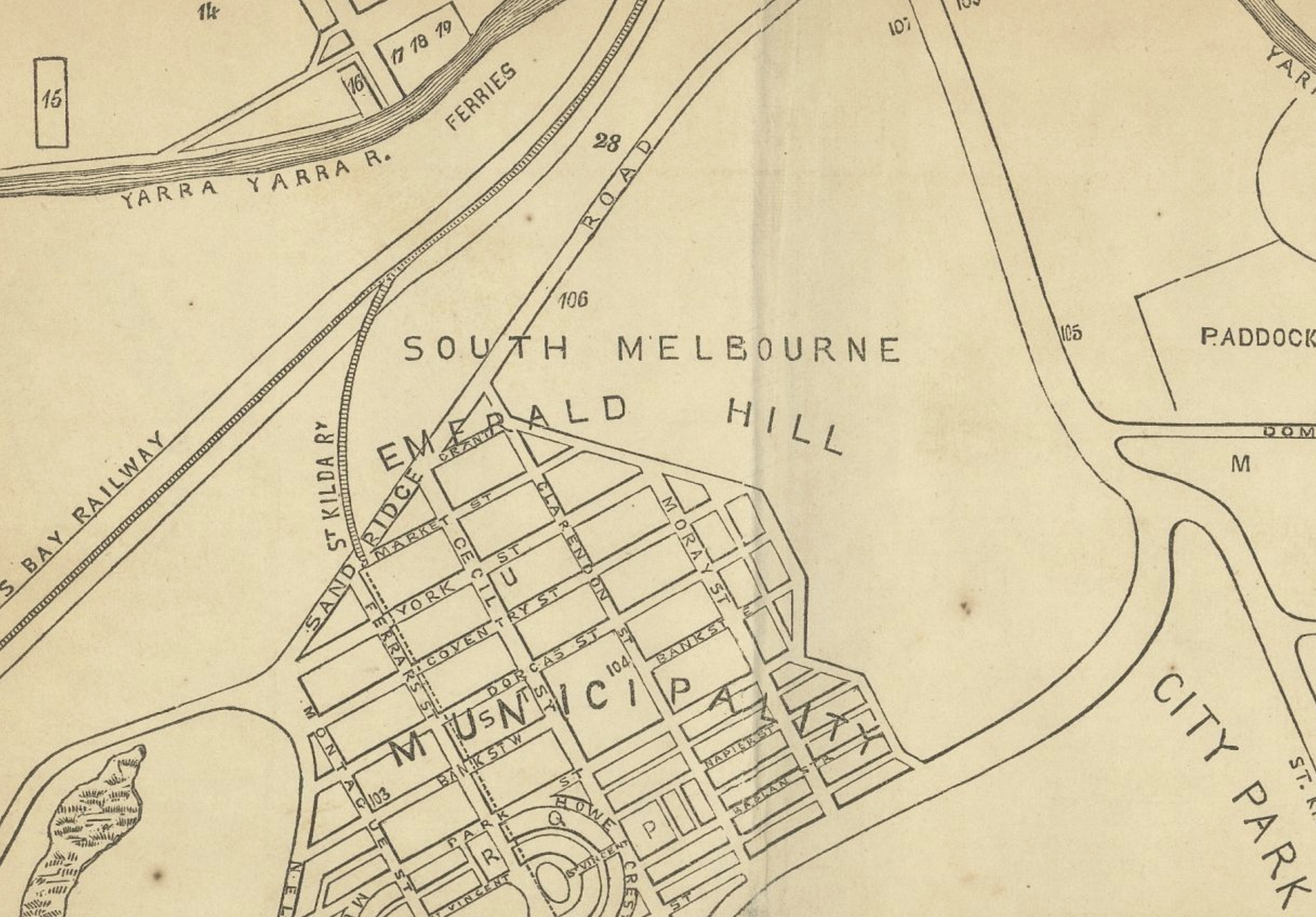

Ground information
- Location: Melbourne, Australia
- Country: Australia
- Establishment: 1852 (first recorded match)

Team information
| Victoria | (1852) |
- As of 21 October 2011; Source: Ground profile

Emerald Hill Cricket Ground (also known as the Melbourne Cricket Club Ground and South Yarra Ground) was a cricket ground in Melbourne, Victoria, Australia. The ground held the second ever first-class match to be played in Australia when Victoria played Tasmania in March 1852. The match was won by Victoria by 61 runs. The last recorded match came on 5 January 1888 when Yarra Bend played GF Vernon's XI.

== See also ==
- List of cricket grounds in Australia
