= Duncan Cooper (cricketer) =

Indian-born Australian cricketer

Personal information
- Full name: Duncan Elphinstone Cooper
- Born: c. 1813; India
- Died: 22 November 1904; Paddington, London, England
- Role: Batsman

Domestic team information
- Years: Team
- 1850/51: Victoria
- Only First-class: 11 February 1851 Victoria v Tasmania

Career statistics
Competition	First-class
Matches	1
Runs scored	4
Batting average	2.00
100s/50s	0/0
Top score	4
Balls bowled	0
Wickets	–
Bowling average	–
5 wickets in innings	–
10 wickets in match	–
Best bowling	–
Catches/stumpings	1/0
- Source: CricketArchive, 7 November 2011

Duncan Elphinstone Cooper (c. 1813 – 22 November 1904) was an Indian-born Australian cricketer who played for Victoria. He was born in Bengal, India and died in Paddington in London.

Cooper was the son of Major General George Cooper (1777–1847) and his first wife Jane née Munn (1778–1823).

In 1841 Cooper travelled from London to Australia with George and Harry Thomson, brothers who were to become his partners as squatters and sheep farmers near Fiery Creek, Raglan. In his spare time Duncan painted landscapes of the surrounding area which were later gathered together and published as The Challicum Sketch Book. In 1849 he occupied the Warrapinjoe run, adjacent to the Thomson brothers' run, with an extent of 14,052 acres.

Cooper made a single first-class appearance for the Victorian cricket team, during the 1850–51 season, against Tasmania. This match was the first ever first-class cricket match in Australia. Cooper opened the batting in the first innings, and thus faced the first ball in Australian first-class cricket. He scored four runs in the first innings, and a duck in the second.

In 1854 Cooper left Australia and returned to London. In 1875 he presented 26 volumes of the work of the Bewick brothers to the Melbourne Public Library. He lived in London, a bachelor, until his death at the age of 90.
