= Thomas Antill =

Australian cricketer

Thomas Wills Antill (20 November 1830 – 11 May 1865) was an Australian cricketer who played for Victoria.

== Biography ==
He was born at Jarvisfield, Picton, New South Wales in 1830. Antill made a single first-class appearance for the team, during the 1850–51 season, against Tasmania. He scored a duck in the first innings in which he batted, and 0 not out in the second. Antill took match figures of 13–51 with the ball. Antill's cousin, Tom Wills, also played first-class cricket.

In 1861 or 1862, he moved from Geelong to Nelson, New Zealand, where he became the manager of the Union Bank of Australia branch. In Nelson, he was active in church affairs. He died on 11 May 1865 after a brief illness, and his funeral procession was the largest that Nelson had witnessed up to that point. He was buried at Wakapuaka Cemetery.
