= NTCA Ground =

Cricket ground in Australia

North Tasmania Cricket Association Ground
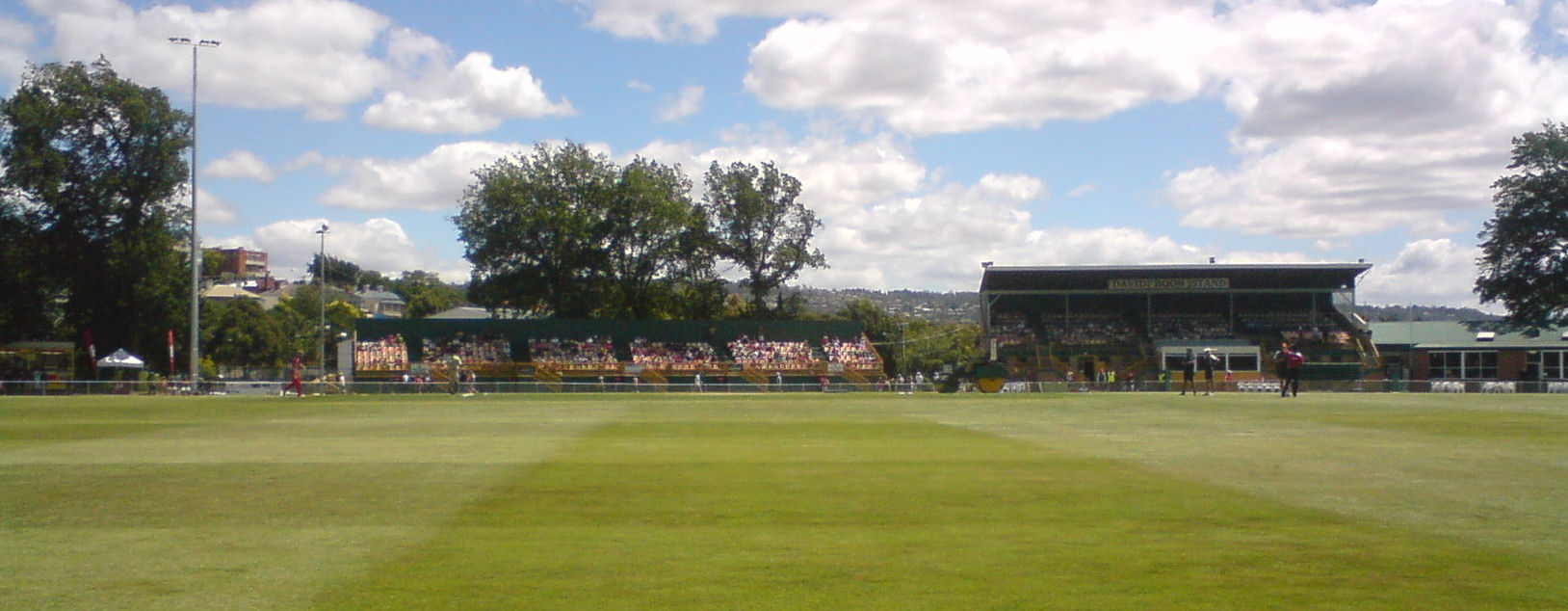
- Interactive map of North Tasmania Cricket Association Ground
- Location: Elphin, Tasmania
- Coordinates: 41°25′47″S 147°9′6″E
- Owner: Launceston City Council
- Operator: Northern Tasmanian Cricket Association (NTCA)
- Capacity: 10,000
- Surface: Grass

Construction
- Architect: Various

Tenants
- Northern Rangers (Association football); Old Scotch (Australian rules football); Launceston (Cricket) South Launceston CC est 1907

Ground information

International information
- Only men's ODI: 2 February 1986: India v New Zealand
- As of 8 January; Source: Cricinfo

The North Tasmania Cricket Association Ground, better known as the NTCA Ground, is the oldest first-class cricket ground in Australia. It is a multi-use sports venue situated in Launceston, Australia. In 1851, the ground hosted Australia's first intercolonial and initial first class cricket match. It is currently used mostly for club cricket matches and has a capacity of under 10,000. Currently, it is the home ground of Launceston Cricket Club, who previously leased the site from the Tasmanian Government after the club formed in 1841 and the area was used for horse racing. South Launceston Cricket Club, Old Scotch Football Club (Australian rules football), East Launceston Junior Football Club (Australian rules football), Northern Rangers Football Club (soccer), Northern Tasmanian Cricket Umpires Association and Cricket Tasmania community cricket and high performance programs are also tenants.

Ownership of the grounds were transferred to Launceston City Council in 1986 and a series of master plans to redevelop the facilities have been commissioned over the past decade to address serious deficiencies resulting from underinvestment in the standard and maintenance of club rooms, changing rooms and training facilities. This work, planned across 5 stages, is estimated to cost approximately $40 million and is currently unfunded.

== History ==
The NTCA Ground was known as the Launceston Racecourse till 1841, after which it was renamed the Launceston Cricket Club Ground. It held this name till the 1885–86 season, after which it was renamed the North Tasmania Cricket Association Ground, a name that continues till date.

The NTCA Ground was the first cricket ground in Australia to host a first-class cricket match. In 1851, the ground hosted the first ever first-class cricket match in Australia, with the Van Diemen's Land XI defeating the Port Phillip XI. In 1986, it hosted its first – and to date, only – one-day international with a record crowd of 9,876 watching India defeat New Zealand.

== Structure ==
The David Boon Stand on the main wing is the pavilion and main stand, and there are two other smaller stands on that wing, as well as an indoor practice facility, members' building and media building. On the outer is the hill, scoreboard, smaller open stand (old scoreboard stand) and plenty of old trees.

== International events ==
A One Day International cricket match between New Zealand and India was held at the NTCA Ground on 2 February 1986. In a rain interrupted match, India won by 22 runs in front of a record crowd of 9,786.
