= Australian cricket team in England and North America in 1878 =

International cricket tour

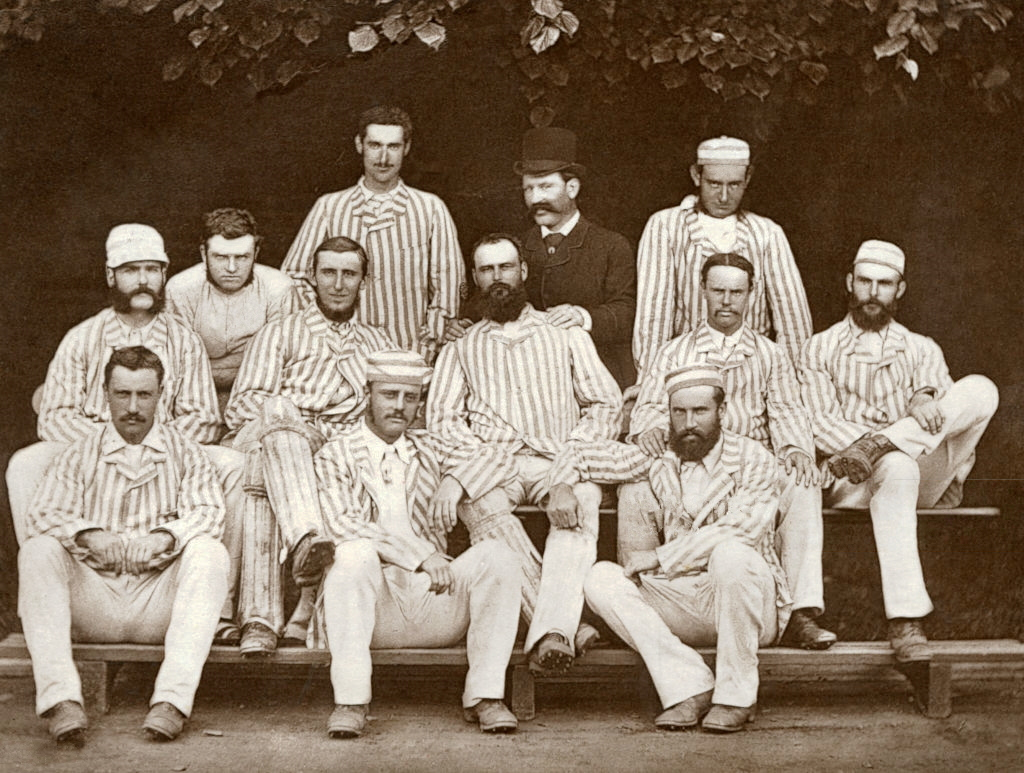
The Australian cricket team photographed in England, 1878. Back row (l-r; standing): Fred Spofforth, John Conway (manager), Frank Allan. Middle row (l-r): George Bailey, Tom Horan (leaning), Tom Garrett, Dave Gregory (captain), Alick Bannerman, Harry Boyle; Front row (l-r): Charles Bannerman, Billy Murdoch, Jack Blackham. Missing: Billy Midwinter.

From May to September in 1878, an Australian cricket team made the inaugural first-class tour of England by a representative overseas side. In October, the Australians played additional matches in the US and Canada on their return journey. The tour followed one made by an England team to Australia in 1876–77, during which the first matches retrospectively given Test match status were played. None of the 1878 matches had international status, nevertheless the tour proved to be such an outstanding financial and sporting success that the future of international cricket was assured. (Note: First-class cricket acquired official status in May 1895 but it is generally reckoned to have begun, albeit unofficially, in 1864 when overarm bowling was legalised. Test cricket was also granted official status in 1895, and 43 international matches played between March 1877 and December 1894 were retrospectively recognised as Tests.)

The Australian team was managed by John Conway and captained by Dave Gregory. William Gibbes, who was a non-player, acted as the team's assistant-manager and secretary. Conway was a journalist from Geelong, Victoria while Gregory and Gibbes were both Sydney-based accountants working for the New South Wales Public Service. These three cricket enthusiasts were the architects of the venture. They and the players each contributed the sum of £50 to finance the expedition and later shared equally in the handsome profits that their enterprise generated, having carted the match takings around with them in a closely guarded strong-box all the time that they were away.

Gregory demonstrated excellent leadership and tactical skills throughout the long tour, while Fred Spofforth became the star performer of the team. Cricket historians consider him to have been one of the greatest fast bowlers in the history of the game.

== Preliminaries ==
During the English tour of Australia in 1876–77, the Australian all-rounder and impresario John Conway met the English captain James Lillywhite in Melbourne and discussed the potential profitability of an Australian team visiting England. Lillywhite agreed to take soundings at home and see if the major English teams would consider hosting a team of "the best cricketers in the colonies". During the 1877 English season, Lillywhite made enquiries and was encouraged by the feedback. He contacted Conway to report interest and, with the possibility of "good money", offered to arrange a fixture list. Conway negotiated with Dave Gregory who had captained the "Combined XI from Sydney and Melbourne" against Lillywhite's professionals in what latterly became recognised as the first two Test matches. It was agreed that the players would form a private company by contributing £50 each to cover expenses, profits to be shared accordingly although Conway as manager would take 7.5% of gross proceeds.

The team sailed from Sydney on 29 March 1878 aboard the SS City of Sydney, reaching San Francisco on 27 April, having called at Auckland and Honolulu en route. They then traveled across America by train, a potentially hazardous undertaking in the era of the James–Younger Gang and others, though Frank and Jesse James were still in hiding after the abortive Northfield Raid in 1876. The Australians sailed from New York on 4 May in the SS City of Berlin, which docked at Liverpool on 13 May. The team caught the train to Nottingham, and arrived there at 12:15 on 14 May to a large reception. On 20 May, they began their first match at Trent Bridge against Nottinghamshire.

== Touring party ==
The Australian party was composed of: J. Conway (Victoria; manager), W. C. V. Gibbes (assistant-manager), D. W. Gregory (New South Wales; captain), F. E. Allan (Victoria), G. H. Bailey (Tasmania), A. C. Bannerman (New South Wales), C. Bannerman (New South Wales), J. McC. Blackham (Victoria; wicket-keeper), H. F. Boyle (Victoria), T. W. Garrett (New South Wales), T. P. Horan (Victoria), W. E. Midwinter (Victoria), W. L. Murdoch (New South Wales) and F. R. Spofforth (New South Wales). Midwinter was already in England, and joined the team in Nottingham for their opening game.

== Tour itinerary ==
The Australians played a total of 42 matches on the tour. Fifteen have first-class status. Most of the 27 minor matches were against local teams, and were played at "odds", whereby the hosts fielded additional players to form teams of eighteen or 22 (labelled as XVIII or XXII). 39 matches were in England, plus two in Scotland, and one in Wales.

From 15 to 17 July, the Australians played Leicestershire at Grace Road, and won by eight wickets. Leicestershire at the time was not a first-class county, and so this match, although it was played eleven-a-side, has a minor classification.

=== First-class matches ===
No.	Date	Opponents	Venue	Result	Ref
1	20–22 May	Nottinghamshire	Trent Bridge, Nottingham	Lost by an innings and 14 runs	
2	27 May	M.C.C.	Lord's, London	Won by nine wickets	
3	30 May – 1 June	Yorkshire	Fartown, Huddersfield	Won by six wickets	
4	3–4 June	Surrey	The Oval, London	Won by five wickets	
5	17–18 June	Gentlemen of England	Prince's, Chelsea	Lost by an innings and 1 run	
6	20–22 June	Middlesex	Lord's, London	Won by 98 runs	
7	1–2 July	Yorkshire	Bramall Lane, Sheffield	Lost by nine wickets	
8	8–9 July	Orleans Club	Orleans Club Ground, Twickenham	Drawn	
9	22–23 July	Cambridge University	Lord's, London	Lost by an innings and 72 runs	
10	15–17 August	Lancashire	Old Trafford, Manchester	Drawn	
11	29–30 August	Sussex	County Ground, Hove	Won by seven wickets	
12	2–3 September	Players	The Oval, London	Won by 8 runs	
13	5–6 September	Gloucestershire	Clifton College Close Ground, Clifton, Bristol	Won by ten wickets	
14	9–10 September	Gentlemen of England	North Marine Road, Scarborough	Drawn	
15	11–12 September	Players	Prince's, Chelsea	Drawn	

== Matches and incidents ==
1878 was a "chilly and wet summer" in which the bad wickets reduced "all (batsmen) to comparative impotence", but enabled bowlers to dominate and cause "havoc". This was certainly the case at Lord's on 27 May.

=== MCC v Australians ===
On 27 May, Marylebone Cricket Club (MCC) hosted the Australians at Lord's. The Australians established their reputation with a nine-wicket victory inside five hours in one of the most sensational games in history.

Play started at three minutes past twelve on a "sticky wicket", a wet pitch drying out as the sun began to shine. In very difficult conditions for batting, a strong MCC team, led by W. G. Grace, was bowled out for 33 (Spofforth 6/4, including a hat trick). Although they in turn dismissed the Australians for 41 (Shaw 5/10, Morley 5/31), MCC in their second innings were out for just 19 (Boyle 5/3, Spofforth 5/16). The Australians needed 12 to win, which was not an easy target in such conditions, but they lost only their star batsman Charles Bannerman in getting them. Spofforth's match analysis was 14.3 overs, five maidens, 20 runs, 11 wickets.

As Bernard Darwin put it, "so ended a memorable day of cold and puddles and calamity".

The match inspired Punch to publish the following verse, a parody of Byron's poem The Destruction of Sennacherib:

The Australians came down like a wolf on the fold,
The Marylebone cracks for a trifle were bowled;
Our Grace before dinner was very soon done,
And Grace after dinner did not get a run.

=== Midwinter dispute ===
Two matches took place in London on 20–22 June: Middlesex versus the Australians at Lord's; and Surrey versus Gloucestershire at The Oval. Shortly before play was due to begin at Lord's, W. G. Grace and others of the Gloucestershire camp turned up and effectively "nabbed" Billy Midwinter, taking him to The Oval to play for Gloucestershire. Midwinter had played for them in 1877, and Grace argued that he was bound to continue if required. Since Gloucestershire had arrived with only ten players, Midwinter most definitely was required.

A dispute ensued with all sorts of agreements and contractual arrangements being argued over. It seems WG was at first rude and insulting, then tried to brazen it out before offering a guarded apology, and eventually getting around to his favourite topic: money. Midwinter apparently did quite well out of it all despite being anything but an innocent party. The Australians got some satisfaction when they beat Middlesex by 98 runs without Midwinter; Gloucestershire, with Midwinter, lost by 16 runs to Surrey.

=== Gloucestershire v Australians ===
On 5 and 6 September, Gloucestershire played the Australians on the Clifton College Close Ground. The Australians won by 10 wickets, thus gaining their revenge on the Graces for the Midwinter fiasco. The match was the champion county's only home defeat of the season. All three Graces were playing, but not Midwinter. Spofforth had match figures of 12/90, though he did not get WG's wicket.

=== Players v Australians ===
On 11 and 12 September, the Australians met the Players at Prince's Ground in the last first-class match of the tour. It was also the last time Prince's Ground (in Chelsea) was used as a first-class venue, Middlesex having moved to Lord's in 1877.

== North American leg of the tour ==
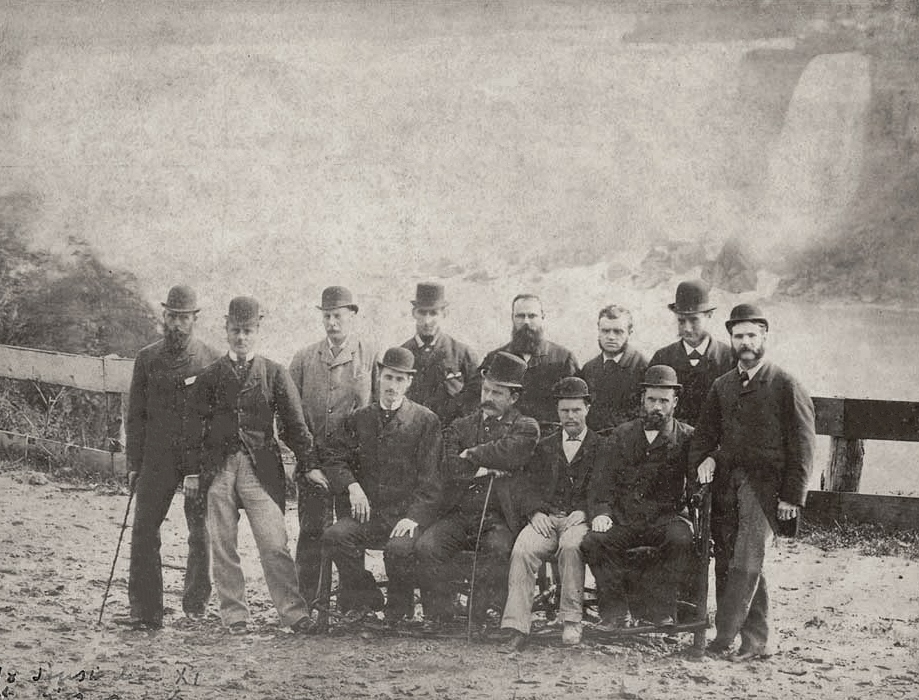
The first Australian touring team (1878) pictured at Niagara Falls

At the end of their tour, the Australians sailed from Liverpool on 18 September in the SS City of Richmond. They arrived in New York over a week later and went on to Philadelphia where they played the Philadelphian cricket team on 3–5 October at the Germantown Ground. This match, which is now unofficially rated first-class, was disrupted by disputes and walk-offs before it ended in a draw. The tourists played five other games, all minor fixtures, in Hoboken, Toronto, Montreal, St Louis and San Francisco. They sailed from San Francisco on 28 October in the SS City of New York, arriving in Sydney on 25 November after being away for almost eight months.

Ancillary note: In San Francisco, the Australian team played a California XXII composed of players from the Occidental and Oakland cricket clubs. The Oakland club was the first cricket team established on the East Bay, which became home to several more between 1878 and 1913. This was the first time a California team played against an Australian national team.

== Aftermath of the Midwinter incident ==
Meanwhile, back in England, the Graces endured months of controversy about the payments they received as supposed amateurs, much of which had come to light as a result of the Midwinter affair. Charges were brought against them at a stormy meeting of the Gloucestershire club's members and they were vilified in the press. In the end, little came of it. The Graces had too much influence. WG was simply too popular to be challenged and EM as a coroner was seen to be a "pillar of the community". So, although their ears burned, they escaped censure and nothing much changed.

== See also ==
- Australian cricket team in New Zealand in 1877–78
- 1878 English cricket season

== Bibliography ==
- ACS (1981). A Guide to Important Cricket Matches Played in the British Isles 1709–1863. Nottingham: ACS. OCLC 85045528.
- ACS (1982). A Guide to First-class Cricket Matches Played in the British Isles. Nottingham: ACS. OCLC 10586869.
- Altham, H. S.; Swanton, E. W. (1962). A History of Cricket, Volume 1 (to 1914) (5th ed.). London: George Allen & Unwin. OCLC 894274808.
- Birley, Derek (1999). A Social History of English Cricket. London: Aurum Press. ISBN 978-18-54107-10-7 – via Internet Archive.
- Bowen, Rowland (1970). Cricket: A History of its Growth and Development. London: Eyre & Spottiswoode. ISBN 978-04-13278-60-9.
- Darwin, Bernard (1978) [1934]. W. G. Grace (Great Lives Series). London: Duckworth. ISBN 978-07-15610-37-4.
- Harte, Chris (1993). A History of Australian Cricket. London: André Deutsch. ISBN 978-02-33988-25-2.
- Knox, Malcolm (2012). Never A Gentlemen's Game. Hardie Grant Books. ISBN 978-17-42701-93-6.
- Rae, Simon (1998). W. G. Grace: A Life. London: Faber & Faber. ISBN 978-05-71178-55-1.
- Robinson, Ray (1975). On Top Down Under. Cassell Australia. ISBN 978-07-26973-64-2.
- Sentance, David (2006). Cricket in America, 1710–2006. MacFarland. ISBN 978-07-86420-40-7.
- Webber, Roy (1951). The Playfair Book of Cricket Records. London: Playfair Books Ltd. OCLC 753176177.

== Annual reviews ==
- James Lillywhite's Cricketers' Annual (Red Lilly), 1879
- John Lillywhite's Cricketer's Companion (Green Lilly), 1879
- Wisden Cricketers' Almanack, 1879
