= MCC v Australians at Lord's, 27 May 1878 =

Cricket match

The match between Marylebone Cricket Club (MCC) and the First Australians, at Lord's on Monday, 27 May 1878, is the lowest scoring completed first-class match on record. It was a media sensation which radically altered English perception of Australian cricketers and was hailed in years to come as "(the match which) marked the commencement of the modern era of cricket".

== Background ==
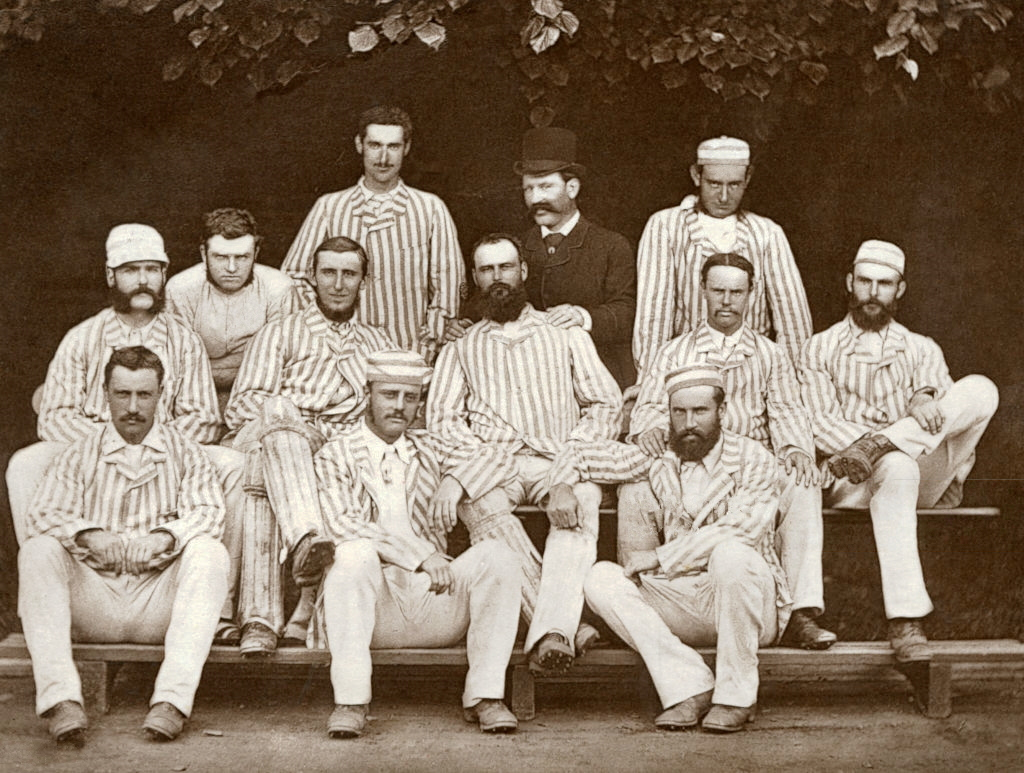
The 1878 Australians (without W. E. Midwinter). Standing: F. R. Spofforth, J. Conway (manager), F. E. Allan. Centre: G. H. Bailey, T. P. Horan, T. W. Garrett, D. W. Gregory, A. Bannerman, H. F. Boyle. Front: C. Bannerman, W. L. Murdoch, J. McC. Blackham.

Following the successful English tour of Australia and New Zealand in 1876–77, arrangements were made for a reciprocal tour of England by a team of "the best cricketers in the colonies", which became known as the "First Australians" (i.e., the first official Australian team to tour England). The team members were John Conway (manager), W. C. V. Gibbes (assistant-manager), Dave Gregory (captain), Frank Allan, George Bailey, Alick Bannerman, Charles Bannerman, Jack Blackham (wicketkeeper), Harry Boyle, Tom Garrett, Tom Horan, Billy Midwinter, Billy Murdoch and Fred Spofforth. Apart from Midwinter, who was already in England, the team left Sydney on 29 March 1878 and sailed via Auckland and Honolulu to San Francisco, from where they travelled across America by train to New York City. They crossed the Atlantic, arriving in Liverpool on 13 May, and then went by train to Nottingham where they played their first match, starting on Monday, 20 May. This was a three-day match against Nottinghamshire at Trent Bridge and the Australians were well beaten by an innings and 14 runs, an inauspicious start which dampened much of the public enthusiasm that their visit had generated.

The Australians were next due to play Marylebone Cricket Club (MCC) in a three-day match at Lord's, commencing on Monday, 27 May. In the meantime, Charles Bannerman and Billy Midwinter were invited to visit Dublin and play for the United South of England Eleven (USEE) against 15 past and present players of Trinity College Dublin (Dublin University Cricket Club). This was due to be played over three days, starting on Thursday, 23 May, at College Park. The USEE was captained by W. G. Grace and included his younger brother Fred. W. G. Grace and Bannerman scored just 11 and 1 respectively in the USEE first innings, while Fred Grace and Midwinter scored 46 and 64. The match was ruined by the weather and ended in a draw.

On Sunday, 26 May, the USEE team caught the ferry back to England and W. G. Grace continued by train to London, probably in the company of Bannerman and Midwinter, as all three were due to take part in the match at Lord's the following day. They could not have guessed that the game would be remembered as "arguably the most momentous six hours in cricket history".

== Monday, 27 May 1878 – MCC v Australians at Lord's ==
1878 was a "chilly and wet summer" in which the bad wickets reduced "all (batsmen) to comparative impotence", but enabled bowlers to dominate and cause "havoc", and that was certainly the case at Lord's on 27 May. CricketArchive states without elaboration that: "the match was scheduled for three days but completed in one".

In the morning session, having won the toss, MCC were dismissed for 33, but then bowled out the Australians for 41. MCC hoped for a better total in the afternoon but were quickly dismissed again, this time for a mere 19. The Australians needed only 12 to win but, given the conditions, were by no means sure of getting them. They succeeded, losing only one wicket, and won a sensational match by 9 wickets. The match aggregate of 105 runs remains the lowest-ever in first-class cricket. In his ghost-written Reminiscences (1899), W. G. Grace recalled that there had been "only four and a half hours of actual cricket" net of the lunch interval and breaks between innings.

The MCC team, captained by Arthur Ridley of Hampshire, was relatively strong and included eight players who represented England during their careers. These were W. G. Grace (Gloucestershire), A. N. Hornby (Lancashire), A. J. Webbe (Middlesex), Wilfred Flowers (Nottinghamshire), George Hearne (Kent), George Vernon (Middlesex), Alfred Shaw (Nottinghamshire) and Fred Morley (Nottinghamshire). The other two, both recognised first-class players, were Nottinghamshire wicketkeeper Frederick Wyld and the amateur batsman Clement Booth of Hampshire).

The Australians were without Blackham so Murdoch took over as wicketkeeper. Their team in batting order was: Charles Bannerman, Midwinter, Horan, Alick Bannerman, Garrett, Spofforth, Gregory (captain), Boyle, Murdoch (wicketkeeper), Allan and Bailey. The umpires were Arnold Rylott and Mordecai Sherwin.

Play started at three minutes past twelve on a "sticky wicket", a wet pitch drying out as the sun began to shine. Only a small crowd was present and it all began well enough for Grace as he hit the opening ball of the match from Allan for four. But another firm shot off his legs sent the second ball straight to Midwinter and Grace was "easily caught at square leg". Another wicket fell to Boyle in the next over and MCC were 5 for two but, with Hornby and Ridley seemingly settling in, they pushed the total on to 27. Then there was a change of bowling and Spofforth came on instead of Allan. Spofforth's first spell at Lord's was "truly demonic". Within another 11 overs, MCC were all out, Spofforth taking 6 for four in just 5.3 overs including a hat-trick with the wickets of Hearne, Shaw and Vernon. Shaw and Morley took five wickets apiece as they dismissed the Australians for 41, the last wicket falling just before the lunch interval.

In the afternoon session, Gregory decided to open his second innings attack with Spofforth and Boyle. The decisive moment was Spofforth's second ball to Grace, which clean bowled him for 0. The MCC innings lasted just 50 minutes, Boyle taking 6 for three and Spofforth 4 for sixteen. Spofforth's match analysis was 14.3 overs, five maidens, 20 runs, 10 wickets. As news of the proceedings spread, the crowd grew in the afternoon sunshine and, at the end, they "mobbed the Australians as they left the field in a spirit of non-partisan enthusiasm". Around 500 had been present at the start but the number grew to 4,742 by the end; the receipts of £119 7s were given to the Australians and MCC paid the expenses. So ended a "memorable day of cold and puddles and calamity".

== Impact and legacy ==
Afterwards, the match was seized upon by the media and widely reported by the press. The news "spread like wildfire and created a sensation in London and throughout England". The satirical magazine Punch responded to the event by publishing a parody of Byron's poem The Destruction of Sennacherib including a wry commentary on Grace's contribution:

The Australians came down like a wolf on the fold,

The Mary'bone Cracks for a trifle were bowled;
Our Grace before dinner was very soon done,

And Grace after dinner did not get a run.

No one in England had taken the Australians very seriously at first, even though they had beaten James Lillywhite's England team in what was retrospectively classified as the inaugural Test match. No one was too surprised when they lost their tour opener by an innings to the strong Nottinghamshire attack of Shaw and Morley on a rain-affected wicket. This perception of Australian cricketers was immediately and permanently revised such that "henceforth a match between Australia and any representative English team would overshadow any of the 'great matches'". Although the match did not mark the birth of international cricket, it was the point in time at which the English sporting public wholeheartedly embraced the concept. As Lord Hawke put it:

(27 May 1878) this marked the commencement of the modern era of cricket.

As for W. G. Grace, his whole approach to cricket was about what was needed to win the game in hand and he never took kindly to defeat. Two decades later, in his Reminiscences, he gave the Australians due credit for their "glorious victory".

== Bibliography ==
- Altham, H. S. (1962). A History of Cricket, Volume 1 (to 1914). George Allen & Unwin.
- Birley, Derek (1999). A Social History of English Cricket. Aurum. ISBN 1-85410-941-3.
- Darwin, Bernard (1978) [1934]. W. G. Grace (Great Lives Series). London: Duckworth. ISBN 978-07-15610-37-4.
- Grace, W. G. (1980) [1899]. Cricketing Reminiscences and Personal Recollections. Hambledon Press. ISBN 978-09-50688-20-6.. Ghost-written by Arthur Porritt.
- Harte, Chris (1993). A History of Australian Cricket. Andre Deutsch. ISBN 0-233-98825-4.
- Midwinter, Eric (1981). W. G. Grace: His Life and Times. George Allen and Unwin. ISBN 978-0-04-796054-3.
- Rae, Simon (1998). W. G. Grace: A Life. ISBN 978-0-571-17855-1.
- Webber, Roy (1951). The Playfair Book of Cricket Records. Playfair Books.
