= George Bailey =

George Bailey is the name of:

== Arts and entertainment ==
- G. W. Bailey (George William Bailey, born 1944), American actor
- George Bailey (It's a Wonderful Life), fictional character in 1946 film
- Capleton (Clifton George Bailey III, born 1967), Jamaican reggae artist

== Sports ==
- George Bailey (cricketer, born 1853) (1853–1926), Australian cricketer
- George Bailey (cricketer, born 1882) (1882–1964), Australian cricketer
- George Bailey (racing driver) (1900–1940), American racecar driver
- George Bailey (athlete) (1906–2000), English steeplechase runner
- George Bailey (footballer) (1919–1998), Australian rules footballer for Carlton and Perth
- George Bailey (cricketer, born 1982), Australian cricketer

== Others ==
- George Bailey Loring (1817–1891), American politician
- George W. Bailey Jr. (1833–1865), American attorney and public official in Vermont
- George E. Bailey (1859–1900), American murder victim
- George Edwin Bailey (1879–1965), British electrical engineer and industrialist
- George Bailey Sansom (1883–1965), English historian of ancient Japan
- George Bailey (journalist) (1919–2001), American journalist
