= Curtis Reid =

Curtis Reid may refer to:

- Curtis Reid (cricketer) (1836–1886), Australian cricketer and umpire
- Curtis Reid (footballer) (1876–1912), Australian rules footballer
- Curtis Reid (rugby union) (born 1994), New Zealand rugby union player

== See also ==
- Curtis Reed (disambiguation)
