= Ernest Wigram =

English cricketer

Personal information
- Full name: Ernest Money Wigram
- Born: 20 November 1862; Kensington, Middlesex, England
- Died: 10 June 1906 (aged 43); Eastry, Kent, England
- Batting: Unknown
- Bowling: Unknown

Career statistics
Competition	First-class
Matches	1
Runs scored	9
Batting average	9.00
100s/50s	–/–
Top score	6
Balls bowled	68
Wickets	0
Bowling average	–
5 wickets in innings	–
10 wickets in match	–
Best bowling	–
Catches/stumpings	1/-
- Source: Cricinfo, 24 December 2018

Ernest Money Wigram (20 November 1862 – 10 June 1906) was an English first-class cricketer.

Born at Kensington, Wigram made a single appearance in first-class cricket for Orleans Club against Oxford University at Twickenham in 1883. He bowled seventeen wicketless overs in the match, while with the bat he scored 6 run in the Orleans Club first-innings, before being dismissed by Alexander Stewart, while in their second-innings he remained unbeaten on 3, with Oxford University winning by 290 runs. He died at Eastry in Kent in June 1906.
