= Gordon Millington =

New Zealand cricketer (1848–1923)

Personal information
- Full name: Gordon Innes Millington
- Born: 4 May 1848; Rugby, Warwickshire, England
- Died: 27 April 1923 (aged 74); Oamaru, North Otago, New Zealand
- Bowling: Fast
- Role: Bowler

Domestic team information
- Years: Team
- 1876/77–1880/81: Otago
- FC debut: 17 January 1877 Otago v Canterbury
- Last FC: 25 February 1881 Otago v Canterbury

Career statistics
Competition	First-class
Matches	2
Runs scored	2
Batting average	0.50
100s/50s	0/0
Top score	1
Balls bowled	373
Wickets	10
Bowling average	14.70
5 wickets in innings	1
10 wickets in match	0
Best bowling	6/37
Catches/stumpings	1/–
- Source: Cricinfo, 2 April 2021

Gordon Innes Millington (4 May 1848 – 27 April 1923) was an English-born New Zealand cricketer and farmer. He played two first-class matches for Otago, one in each of the 1876–77 and 1880–81 seasons.

Millington was born at Rugby in England in 1848. His father, John Millington, died during Millington's childhood and he grew up in the town living with his mother on North Street. Along with two of his brothers, Millington was educated at Rugby School, attending the school between 1857 and 1865. He moved to New Zealand in 1875, settling at Ngapara near Oamaru in North Otago.

A fast bowler, Millington took 3 for 57 and 6 for 37 when Otago lost to Canterbury in 1876–77. A few weeks later he was Otago's most successful bowler against the touring English team, taking 6 for 54 off 45.3 four-ball overs in an innings defeat. In 1878 he was one of the best New Zealand bowlers in the matches against the touring Australians, taking 5 for 44 to help give Otago a first-innings lead in the drawn match. "The Australians failed against Millington, who again proved himself Otago's mainstay," wrote the New Zealand cricket historian Tom Reese.

Millington captained the Oamaru team against the next Australian touring team in 1880–81, taking 4 for 34 off 36.2 four-ball overs. He also captained Oamaru against the Auckland team that was making its first tour of the South Island in 1882–83; he took 7 for 81 in Auckland's only innings.

In the 1880s Millington farmed with his brother John, who also played cricket for Oamaru, at Papakaio in North Otago―John later moved to farm in New South Wales. Gordon Millington spent most of the rest of his life in Oamaru working as a woolclasser. He died in the town in April 1923 aged 74.
