= George Bailey (cricketer, born 1982) =

Australian cricketer

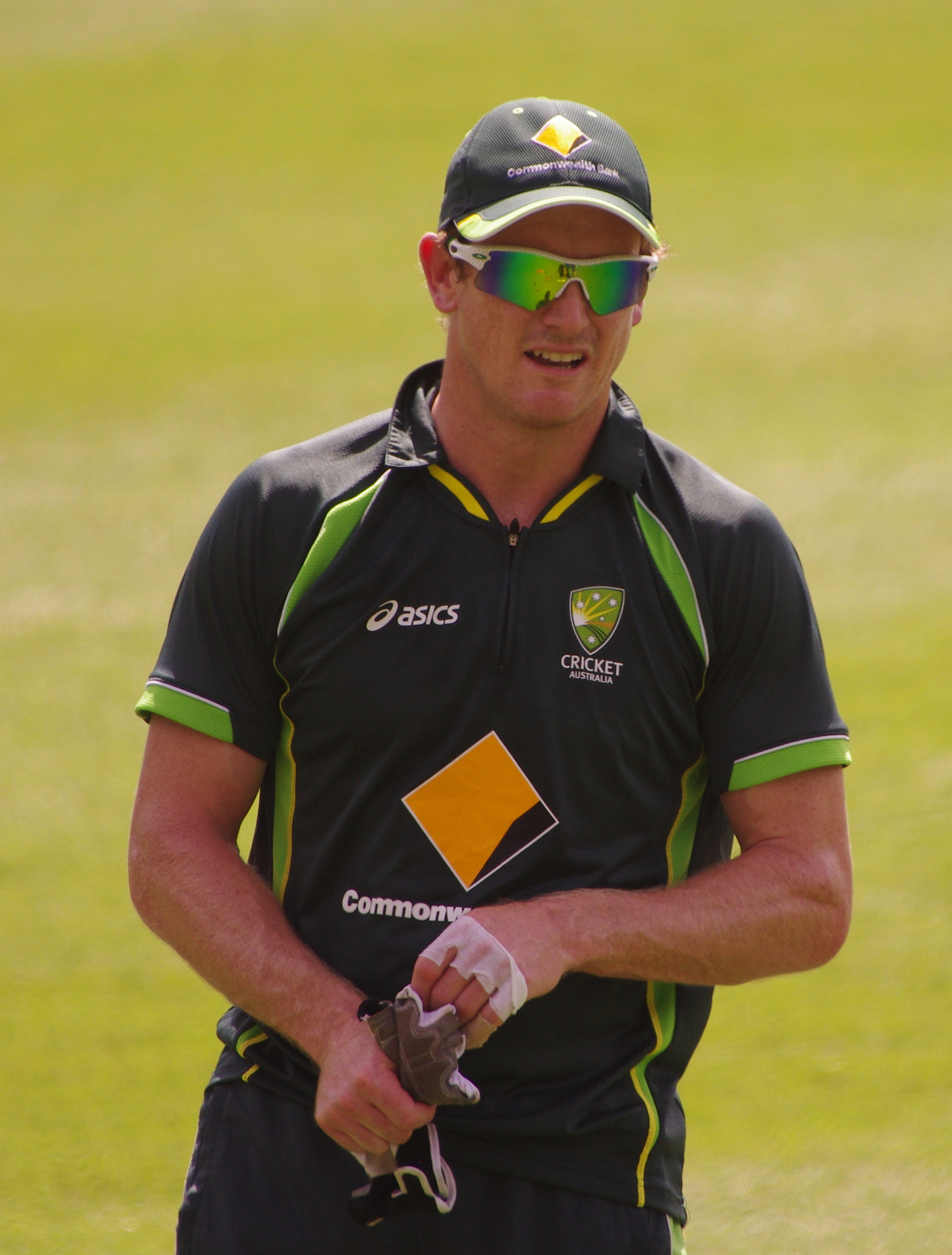
- Bailey in 2014

Personal information
- Full name: George John Bailey
- Born: 7 September 1982 (age 44); Launceston, Tasmania, Australia
- Nickname: Hector
- Height: 178 cm (5 ft 10 in)
- Batting: Right-handed
- Bowling: Right-arm medium
- Role: Top-order batter
- Relatives: George H. Bailey (great-great-grandfather)

International information
- National side: Australia (2012–2017)
- Test debut (cap 436): 21 November 2013 v England
- Last Test: 3 January 2014 v England
- ODI debut (cap 195): 16 March 2012 v West Indies
- Last ODI: 9 December 2016 v New Zealand
- ODI shirt no.: 2
- T20I debut (cap 55): 1 February 2012 v India
- Last T20I: 15 September 2017 v Pakistan
- T20I shirt no.: 2

Domestic team information
- Years: Team
- 2001/02–2019/20: Tasmania (squad no. 10)
- 2007–2010: Scotland
- 2009–2010: Chennai Super Kings
- 2011/12: Melbourne Stars
- 2012/13–2019/20: Hobart Hurricanes
- 2013, 2017: Hampshire
- 2014–2015: Kings XI Punjab
- 2015: Sussex
- 2016: Rising Pune Supergiants
- 2016: Middlesex

Career statistics
Competition	Test	ODI	T20I	FC
Matches	5	90	30	161
Runs scored	183	3,044	473	10,079
Batting average	26.14	40.58	24.89	38.32
100s/50s	0/1	3/22	0/2	24/52
Top score	53	156	63	200*
Catches/stumpings	10/–	48/–	10/–	136/–
Medal record
Men's Cricket
Representing Australia
ICC Cricket World Cup
Winner	2015 Australia and New Zealand
- Source: ESPNcricinfo, 10 December 2019

George John Bailey (born 7 September 1982) is a former Australian cricketer, who played all formats for the national team and captained the team in limited-over formats. Domestically, Bailey played for the Tasmanian cricket team in all three domestic state competitions (the Sheffield Shield, One-Day Cup and KFC Twenty20 Big Bash) as well as the Hobart Hurricanes and Melbourne Stars in the Twenty20 Big Bash's successor, the KFC Big Bash League. He has also played in the Indian Premier League and T20 Blast, and in Scotland with Grange Cricket Club. Bailey was a member of the Australian team that won the 2015 Cricket World Cup.

Bailey was appointed as Twenty20 captain of the Australian national team in 2012, succeeding Cameron White prior to the two match series against India that ended 1–1. He became the second ever Australian to captain an international game without having played an international game before, after Dave Gregory in the first ever Test match. On 1 May 2013, Bailey was appointed the vice-captain of the Australian ODI team for the 2013 ICC Champions Trophy.

He captained the Australian team in India in ODI in the absence of Michael Clarke.

In November 2013, Bailey was named in the Australian team for the 2013–14 Ashes series against England. He played all five matches of the series, but was subsequently dropped from the Test team.

In the 2017–18 season, Bailey won his first Ricky Ponting Medal for Tasmania's best player in the previous season. He was appointed as the chief selector of Cricket Australia in August 2021.

== Early life and education ==
Bailey is the great-great-grandson of George Herbert Bailey, who represented Tasmania in 15 first-class matches, and the great-grandson of Keith Bailey, who represented Tasmania in two first-class matches. He was born and raised in Launceston, Tasmania. He attended the Launceston Church Grammar School, where he was school captain and graduated in 2000. He then studied business at the University of Tasmania, and resided at Jane Franklin Hall. Bailey graduated with a Graduate Certificate of Management in 2016, and completed a Master of Business Administration degree at the university in 2019.

== Domestic and T20 franchise career ==
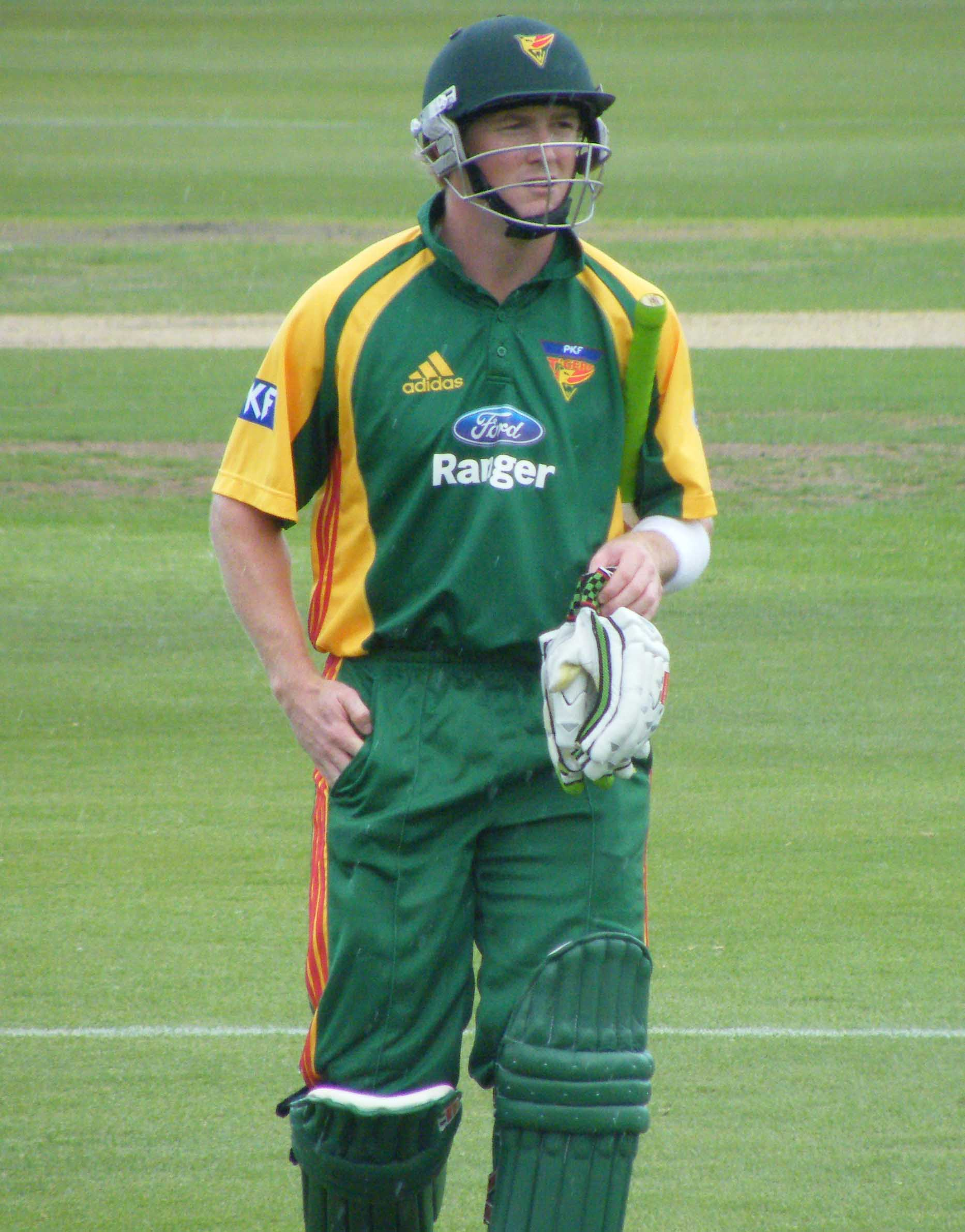
Bailey playing with Tasmania in 2008.

A destructive striker who can change a match within a few overs, Bailey arrived as a state one-day player at the age of 19 after playing his junior cricket with the South Launceston Cricket Club. Bailey was first selected to play for Tasmania in 2005/06, due to injuries to regular players, and he was given an extended stint in the first-class team, scoring 778 Pura Cup runs, including three centuries, and earning a second invitation to the academy.

Talk of the state leadership and possible national team representation began that summer, after he scored a highest score was 155 against South Australia, an innings that formed part of a state-record fourth-wicket partnership of 292 with Travis Birt.

Another highlight came shortly before the 2006/07 season, when he bludgeoned 136 from 65 balls for the academy against a Zimbabwe Board XI. Bailey is a former national under-19 player.

Further prominent performances in the coming seasons saw Bailey play for Australia against the All Star team in the All Star Twenty20 match in 2009. Bailey was appointed as the permanent captain of Tasmania for the 2009/10 season, replacing Daniel Marsh.

In February 2011, Bailey led Tasmania to a five wicket Sheffield Shield win over Victoria where he scored an unbeaten 160. Needing 130 in the final session, he and James Faulkner pushed the Tigers past the total in the 91st over of play on the final day to lift Tasmania to second on the table behind New South Wales.

He captained Tasmania to its second Sheffield Shield title against New South Wales at Bellerive Oval in 2010/11.

In the 2011/12 Ryobi Cup final in Adelaide, Bailey showed he is made of stern stuff; he scored 101 and was out in the last over. But although Tasmania tied with South Australia, they lost the title because South Australia finished top of the ladder that season.

In 2012, he was signed by the Melbourne Stars for the first season of the Big Bash League. Bailey scored 114 runs at an average of 19 for the Melbourne Stars in the Big Bash League.

In June 2019, he was selected to play for the Montreal Tigers franchise team in the 2019 Global T20 Canada tournament.

=== Indian Premier League ===
Bailey played in the Indian Premier League for Chennai Super Kings from 2009 season, during which the franchise won the title in 2010 and 2011 and were runners-up in 2012. Playing time behind Chennai's established batting order was scarce: in four seasons with the franchise he played four matches for a top score of 30, before being released ahead of the 2013 season.

He returned to the IPL in 2014 as captain of Kings XI Punjab, leading the side to the franchise's first IPL final, which they lost to Kolkata Knight Riders. He continued as captain in 2015, a season in which his 61 not out against Mumbai Indians earned him the Man of the Match award, though the team struggled for form overall. He went unsold at the 2016 auction.

In May 2016, Bailey was signed by the new franchise Rising Pune Supergiants as a replacement for Faf du Plessis, who was ruled out with a finger injury. Across his three IPL franchises, Bailey played 40 matches, scoring 663 runs at an average of 24.55 and a strike rate of 121.87, with a highest score of 61 not out.

== International career ==
George Bailey's record as captain
	Matches	Won	Lost	Drawn	Tied	No result	Win %
ODI	29	16	10	0	0	3	55.17%
Twenty20	28	14	13	0	1	–	50%
Date last Updated:		2 September 2015					

In early 2010, Bailey was called up for the ODIs in New Zealand when Michael Clarke returned home for personal reasons – but did not win a cap. He subsequently had to wait until 2012 to make his international debut. When he did, he did so as captain of the Australian national Twenty20 team, succeeding Cameron White prior to the two match series against India, which ended 1–1. He became the second ever Australian to captain an international game, without having played an international game before, after Dave Gregory in the first ever Test match.

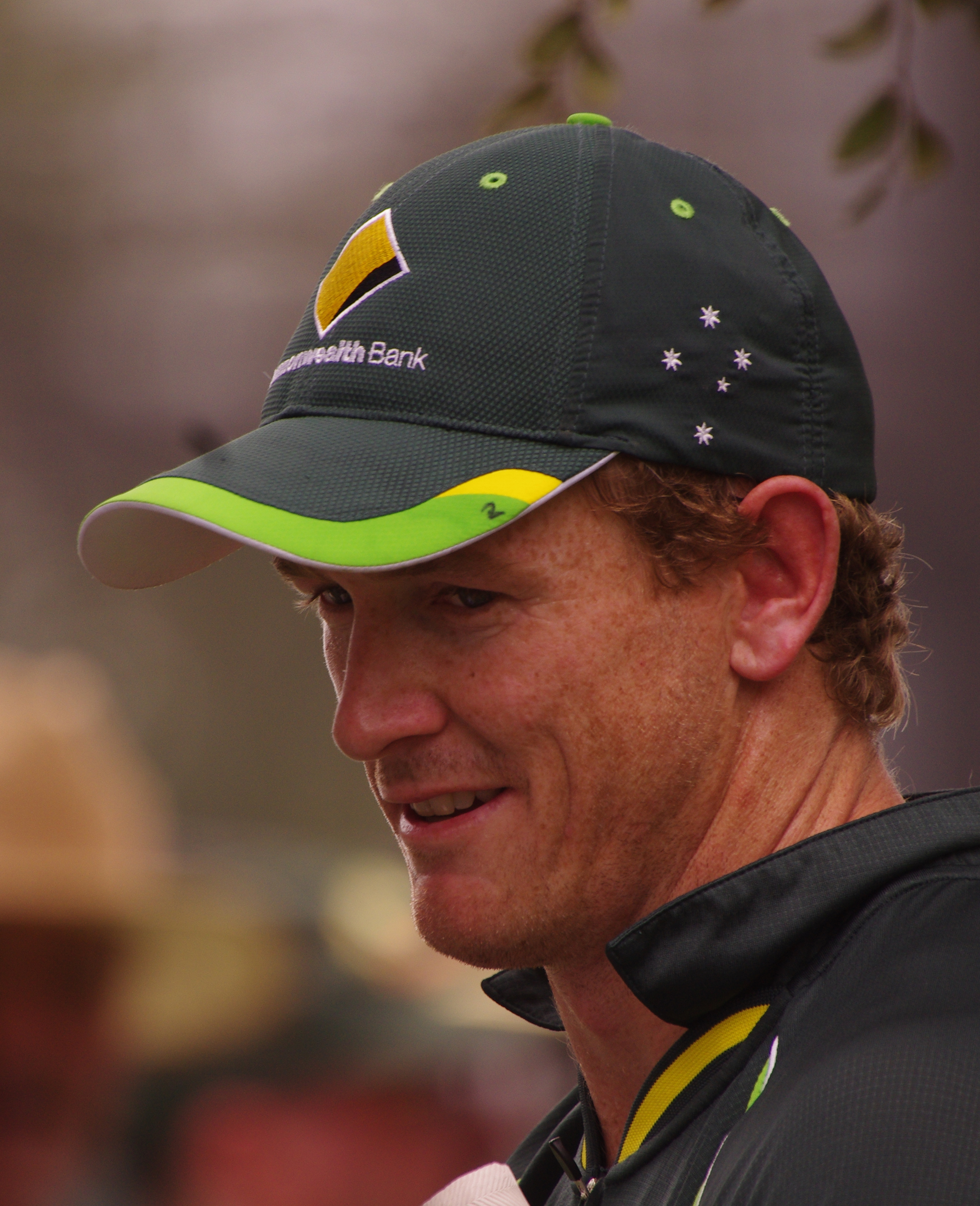
Bailey with Australia in 2014

When he walked out as leader for the T20 at Sydney's Stadium Australia and the match at the MCG, Bailey was in charge of a new-look side. The fast-bowling allrounder James Faulkner was on his debut, the batsman Travis Birt had earned a recall nearly two years after his last international appearance and Brad Hogg had returned after retiring in 2008.

There had been criticism over his appointment. Bailey's highest score in the shortest format at the time of his appointment had been 60 and he had made only one T20 half-century in the previous three seasons, but he said batting at No.5 opportunities were often limited. He led Australia to victory in his first game. He presided over a 31-run defeat of India in his first match promoting Matthew Wade to the opener's post where he scored 72 .

In second match of the series Australia lost the match and series was levelled. He made some hasty decisions such as sending Matthew Wade at No. 6 given the fact that in the first match he had opened and made 72. He still contributed with 32 and his opening replacement Aaron Finch top-scored with 36, but Shaun Marsh at first drop failed to score and the batting was weakened with the allrounders Daniel Christian and James Faulkner left out.

He was named in ODI the squad for the West Indies tour. As a result of an injury to Australian captain Michael Clarke, he was included in the first ODI of the series and Bailey top scored with 48 runs in Australia's 204 for 8. He was the third highest run scorer in the series with 172 runs behind Kieron Pollard and Michael Hussey. He also scored his first half-century.

During a T20 series against West Indies, he scored 45 runs in two matches. Like the India series, the West Indies series was ended in tie. Australia won the first match by 8 wickets but lost the second match by 14 runs.

At the start of the Ireland and England tour it was decided that Bailey would not receive a central contract for the 2012/13 season, despite being captain of the national T20I team.

In the fifth ODI Bailey produced some excellent cricket, rounding off his efforts with a 46 from 41 balls to ensuring that Australia posted a troubling total for England.

He was named as the ODI captain of the team in absence of the captain Michael Clarke and vice-captain Shane Watson. He led three ODIs in the five match series, winning two and losing one. He made an impressive 89 during the win at the MCG to give a good first impression as captain.

Bailey scored his maiden ODI century in a match against the West Indies. Australia had been in a difficult situation at 56/4 when Bailey came in but his 125 not out from 110 balls took Australia to a challenging total of 266.

During the 2013 ODI series against India, Bailey scored a total of 478 runs, setting a record for the most runs by any batsman in a bilateral series. With one match remaining, he had broken the previous record of 467 set by Zimbabwe's Hamilton Masakadza in a five-match series against Kenya in 2009, which in turn was broken by India's Rohit Sharma in the same series. In the sixth match of the series, Bailey posted an innings of 156, and in doing so went past 1,500 ODI runs in only his 32nd innings. Only Hashim Amla has done it faster in 30 innings. Bailey became only the ninth Australian to score 1000 or more ODI runs in a calendar year.

He was also named in the ODI XI by ESPNcricinfo for his performances in 2013.

In November 2013, Bailey became Australia's 436th Test cap in the Ashes and was presented with the baggy green before the start of play by a former captain Mark Taylor. In December 2013, Bailey hit 28 runs off an over from James Anderson in the Third Ashes Test at WACA Ground equalling Brian Lara's record for the most runs off an over in Test cricket.

He was also awarded the Men's ODI Player of the Year at the Allan Border Medal ceremony by the CA in 2014.

On 7 September 2014, George Bailey resigned as the captain of the Australian T20I team to focus solely on the 2015 ODI World Cup.

In 2015, Bailey was named in the Australian squad that won the 2015 Cricket World Cup. However, due to an injury to regular captain Michael Clarke, he played as well as captained in only one match in the tournament, the tournament opener against England, in which he scored 55 runs off 69 balls and led Australia to a comfortable 111-run victory. Though Australia went on to clinch their fifth World Cup defeating New Zealand by 7 wickets, Bailey did not play in any other match in the tournament and remained solely as a mentor and substitute fielder.

In August 2017, he was named in a World XI side to play three Twenty20 International matches against Pakistan in the 2017 Independence Cup in Lahore. In the third match of the series, Bailey undertook wicketkeeping duties.

== Channel Nine controversy ==
During the 2012–13 summer, George Bailey led a one-day Australian team lacking draw-cards David Warner and Shane Watson. This led to criticism from Channel Nine, who broadcast the game. Bailey defended the side at a press conference, saying Channel Nine were motivated in part by a desire to talk down the game and thus pay a cheaper price for the TV rights:

I can probably understand it coming from Channel Nine. I think they're about to go into negotiations for the TV rights. I think that was a pretty tactical move to try to talk down one-day cricket and what the Australian team's putting out. But it's still called the Australian cricket team.

Channel Nine's executive director of cricket, and former NSW player Brad McNamara, angrily denied this:

Nowhere has Channel Nine ever talked the one-day game down, nowhere have we ever said this is a 'B team'. It's rubbish and George should stick to playing cricket and leave (television) rights to the people who know what they're talking about. I reckon he's got his hands full as it is. He needs to concentrate on staying in the side. And he needs to understand where his money's coming from. Without the TV rights deal, George is probably working in a coalmine or flipping burgers at McDonald's.

Cricket writer Jarrod Kimber later argued that this caused a permanent schism between Bailey and Channel Nine. He says it was brought to a head during the 2013–14 Ashes test in Sydney, when Bailey failed to make a fifty in two attempts:

It seemed that no one in the Channel Nine box could make a comment about him that wasn't negative. His feet, hands, technique and temperament were questioned. His second-innings 46 was not enough. And they weren't always wrong. It just seemed kind of mean. Especially when at the back of the press box some seemed happy when he was out. But it went deeper than McNamara's comments. Bailey had made mistakes in his career. He hadn't made enough first-class runs. He hadn't come into the team as a young man. He came into the captaincy without playing a game. He came into the Test team because of one-day runs. He was everything old-school cricket didn't like. A thinking cricketer who had never demanded inclusion, but who had been included regardless. For old-school types like Ian Chappell, he was pretty much everything he didn't like. And Chappell wasn't just turning on Bailey because of his stoush with Channel Nine. He had not liked Bailey for a long time.

Preceded by Daniel Marsh	Tasmanian First-Class cricket captains 2009/10–2018/19	Succeeded by Matthew Wade
Preceded by Daniel Marsh	Tasmanian One-Day cricket captains 2009/10 – Current	Succeeded by Xavier Doherty
Preceded by Cameron White	Australian national cricket captain (T20I); 2012–2014	Succeeded by Aaron Finch
