= Richard Terry =

Richard Terry may refer to:

- Ben Terry (Richard Benjamin Terry, fl. 1877–1881), Test cricket umpire
- Sir Richard Terry (musicologist) (1864–1938), English organist, choir director and musicologist
- Richard Terry, chef de cuisine of the Oriental Club, author of Indian Cookery (1861)
- Rick Terry (born 1974), American football player
