= Sam Cosstick =

English cricketer & umpire (1836–1896)

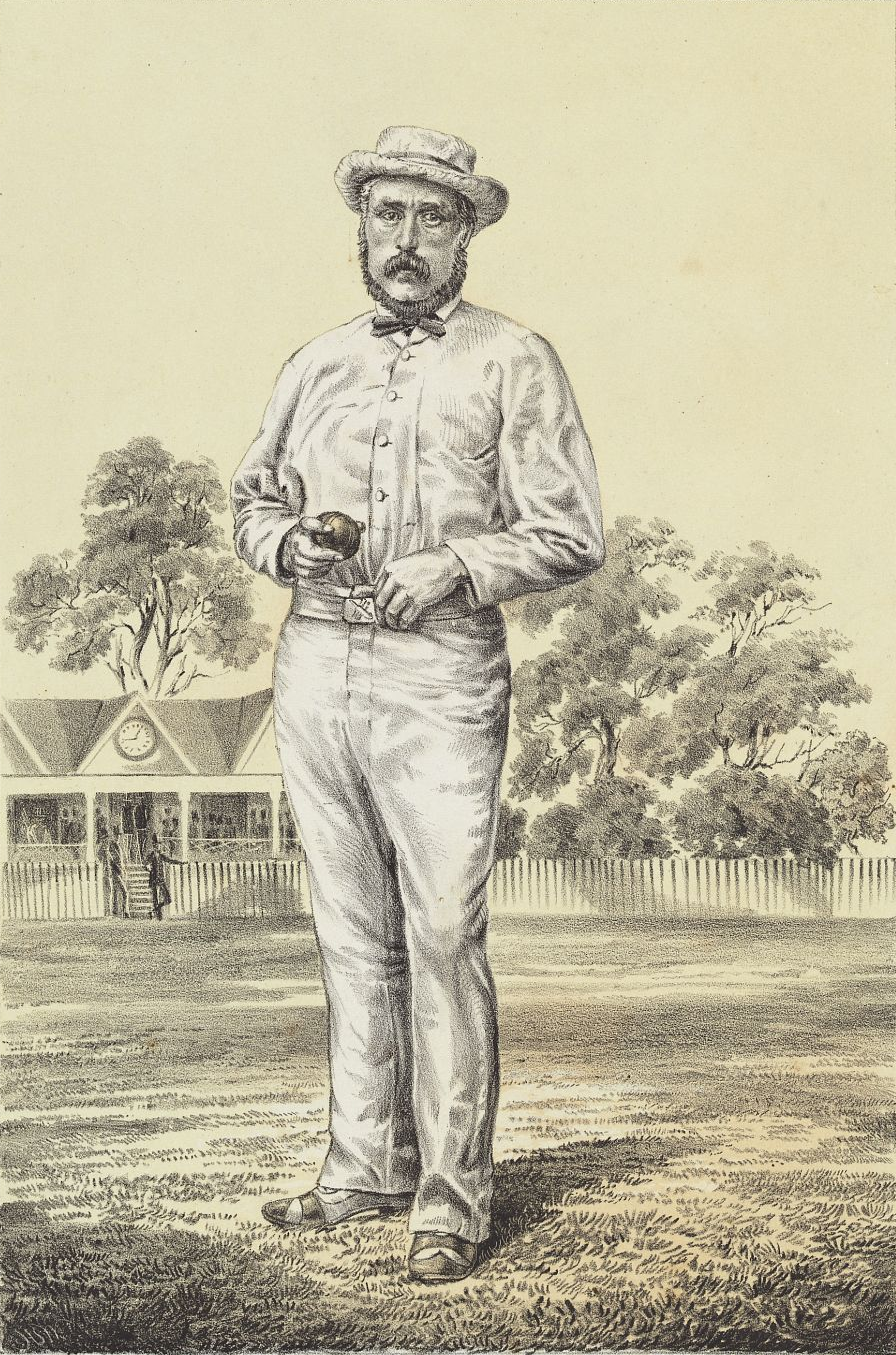

Personal information
- Born: 1 January 1836; Croydon, England
- Died: 8 April 1896 (aged 60); West Maitland, Australia
- Batting: Right-handed
- Bowling: Right-arm medium

Domestic team information
- Years: Team
- 1860/61–1875/76: Victoria
- 1865/66: New South Wales
- Source: Cricinfo, 3 May 2015

Samuel Cosstick (1 January 1836 – 8 April 1896) was an important figure in developing cricket in Victoria in its formative years. He is well known for umpiring in the second ever Test match, played between Australia and England in Melbourne, 1877.

== Biography ==
Cosstick was born at Croydon, Surrey, England. He was attracted to Victoria by the gold fever of the early 1850s and joined the Melbourne Cricket Club on arrival. There he was employed as a ground bowler, bowling in the nets to the members for hours at a time for a salary of £150 a year.

Cosstick was a right-hand batsman and right-arm medium-fast roundarm bowler. He played 18 matches for Victoria from 1860 to 1876. As a batsman he scored 315 runs at an average of 9.84 with a highest score of 36. He took 106 wickets at an average of 9.41, with best figures of 9 for 61. He took five wickets in an innings 11 times, and ten wickets in a match on 5 occasions. He also took 14 catches. In 1869 Cosstick took 6 wickets for 1 run against Tasmania, which is still the cheapest 6-wicket analysis in first-class cricket history.

In the match between Eighteen of Victoria and the All England Eleven led by H. H. Stephenson played at Melbourne in January 1862 – the first international match played in Australia – Cosstick made 8 and 11, and took 1 wicket for 31 runs for a team that was decisively beaten by an innings in spite of its advantage in numbers.

W. G. Grace brought out an English team in the 1873–74 season, and Cosstick's bowling, along with the batting of Bransby Cooper and John Conway and the bowling of Frank Allan and Harry Boyle were responsible for the visitors’ defeat by an innings by Eighteen of Victoria. Impressive though the result was, a newspaper correspondent wrote "any numbskulls who talk about Eleven Victorian natives playing this Eleven of England are prattling about what they don’t understand."

In Sydney, playing for a Combined Fifteen of Victoria and New South Wales, the crowd urged Cosstick to return to the crease after he was given out. He did so, claiming that the wrong umpire had given him out. With three batsmen at the wicket, Grace led his team from the field until Cosstick abandoned his protest.

At the age of 41, Cosstick umpired in the second ever Test match, played between Australia and England in Melbourne on 31 March to 4 April 1877. His colleague was Ben Terry, who was also an English professional at Melbourne Cricket Club.

In 1883 Samuel was offered a position as the Grounds Keeper of the Albion Cricket Ground and Showgrounds in Maitland New South Wales. This area is now known as the Maitland Showgrounds.

Cosstick died in West Maitland, New South Wales in 1896 at the age of 60.

== See also ==
- Australian Test Cricket Umpires
- List of Test cricket umpires

== Bibliography ==
- Pollard, Jack, ‘’Australian Cricket: 1803–1893, The Formative Years’’. Sydney, The Book Company, 1995. (ISBN 0-207-15490-2)
