= Australian cricket team in New Zealand in 1877–78 =

International cricket tour

The Australian cricket team toured New Zealand in January and February 1878, before their 1878 tour of England. It was the first overseas tour by a representative Australian team.

The Australians played seven matches against provincial teams, six of which fielded 22 players (the other team, Canterbury, fielded 15) with the aim of providing more evenly-matched contests. As the matches were not 11-a-side they are not considered to have been first-class.

The team had assembled in November 1877, playing matches against teams in four Australian colonies.

== The team ==
- Dave Gregory (captain)
- George Bailey
- Alec Bannerman
- Charles Bannerman
- Jack Blackham
- Harry Boyle
- Tom Garrett
- Tom Horan
- Tom Kendall
- Billy Murdoch
- Fred Spofforth

John Conway was the manager and umpire, standing with a local umpire in each match. William Gibbes, a clerk in the New South Wales audit department, was the assistant manager, who preceded the arrival of the team to finalise tour arrangements. Frank Allan was named in the original 12-man team but pulled out of the trip shortly before the team left Australia, suffering from sciatica, leaving the Australians with just 11 players. Gibbes played in the match against Wellington, relieving Boyle.

== The matches ==
- Southland v Australians, the cricket ground, Invercargill, 9, 10 January 1878. Southland XXII 89 and 39; Australians 267. Australians won by an innings and 139 runs. (Most newspapers referred to the local team as "Invercargill", not "Southland".)

Spofforth took 14 for 25 in the first innings; 11 of his victims were bowled. Charles Bannerman opened Australia's innings and scored 125 not out, which was the Australians' only century of the tour. One of his hits over square leg landed in an orchard 50 metres from the ground. Horan made 53. In the first innings the Southland number 10, John Wesney, made 39 not out, and during a 21st-wicket partnership of 27 struck a ball from Spofforth over the fence.

The Australians' ship berthed at Bluff early on the morning of the match, they arrived by train at Invercargill at 10 o'clock, and the match began at noon. The match days were declared half-holidays in Invercargill, and special concerts were held each evening at the Theatre Royal.

- Otago v Australians, Caledonian Ground, Dunedin, 12, 14, 15 January 1878. Otago XXII 124 and 93; Australians 92. Drawn. (Rain prevented play on the third day.)

Garrett took 7 for 25 and 13 for 33. The highest score in the match was 28 by the Otago batsman Hugh MacNeil. The Otago opening bowler Gordon Millington took 5 for 44, helping Otago achieve a 32-run first-innings lead.

- Oamaru v Australians, Northern Ground, Oamaru, 17 January 1878. Oamaru XXII 70 and 10 for 43; Australians 113. Drawn. (Some sources regard this match as a victory to the Australians, as they led on the first innings in a one-day match.)

Charles Bannerman made 45, the only score on either side higher than 18. A public holiday was declared in the town for the match.

Tom Horan later wrote that the ground resembled a "worn-out potato paddock on which the lovers of the noble game endeavour to play to the detriment of their legs, body and head".

- Canterbury v Australians, Hagley Oval, Christchurch, 19, 21, 22, 23, 24 January 1878. Australians 46 and 143; Canterbury XV 135 and 57 for 8. Canterbury won by six wickets. (Rain prevented play on the second and third days.)

Canterbury asked to play on even terms, with 11 players a side, but the Australians refused, hoping to prolong the game and thus increase the gate takings. Eventually it was settled that Canterbury would field 15 players, but before the match the reporter in the Christchurch newspaper The Lyttelton Times regretted the decision not to field 18. Without exceptional luck, he said, "I am afraid we shall have to put up with defeat". Interest in the match was high, and the largest Christchurch businesses and law firms closed on each day of the match at midday, which was the scheduled time for play to begin.

The sides agreed to play on a different pitch for each innings, and the Australians got the worse of the arrangement of the first day, when the bowling of the brothers Charlie and William Frith was "almost unplayable" on a "springy" pitch, and despite dropping several catches Canterbury dismissed the Australians for 46. When Canterbury batted, Spofforth bowled at his fastest, taking 9 for 77, all his victims being bowled, several by yorkers, but Arthur Ollivier (36) and the captain, William Neilson (26), defied the bowling and took the score to 105 for 10 at stumps.

After rain washed out the second and third days, a crowd of 8000 turned up to watch the fourth day's play. Tom Horan scored 58 not out, but the rest of the Australian batsmen were troubled by Edwin Fuller, who took 8 for 35, finishing the innings off on the fifth day. Canterbury needed 55 to win, and completed their victory after eight wickets had fallen.

In all 20,000 spectators watched the match, but as the field was in a public park no admission fee could be charged, and the Australians' takings were disappointing. The result caused some surprise in Australia, where the newspapers mixed their tributes to the good play of the Canterbury side with doubts about the pitch, the tour schedule and the New Zealand umpiring.

This match was the only one the 1877-78 Australians lost. It was not until the 1966–67 season that a team representing Australia suffered a first-class defeat in New Zealand – also at the hands of Canterbury.

- Wellington v Australians, Basin Reserve, Wellington, 26, 28, 29 January 1878. Wellington XXII 91 and 84; Australians 166 and 1 for 10. Australians won by nine wickets.

Spofforth took 14 for 40 in the first innings, 11 of them bowled. George Bailey's 33 not out was the highest score in the match. As the match was completed early on the third day, a single-innings match was played to fill in the time, Wellington scoring 213 all out and the Australians 6 for 1.

In Wellington all government offices and banks and most businesses were closed on the Monday and Tuesday afternoons of the match. The Wellington cricketers held a ball for the Australians on the evening of the 28th, and the dancing continued "till long past midnight".

- Hawke's Bay v Australians, R. A. W. Brathwaite's Paddock, Hastings, 1, 2 February 1878. Hawke's Bay XXII 49 and 69; Australians 151. Australians won by an innings and 33 runs.

Spofforth took 11 for 33 and 11 for 26; 16 of his victims were bowled. Tom Garrett's 52 was by far the highest score. J. Liddle took 5 for 51 for Hawke's Bay. The first day of the match, a Friday, was declared a public holiday in Napier for the occasion.

The Australians arrived in Napier on the Wanaka from Wellington on the morning of the match, then travelled by train to Hastings. The match started at two o'clock, "in Mr Braithwaite's paddock at Hastings, about a mile from the railway station". Rather than toss a coin to decide who would bat first, the Australians asked to be allowed to field, in order to work off the effects of their journey.

- Auckland v Australians, Auckland Domain, Auckland, 7, 8, 9 February 1878. Auckland XXII 85 and 62; Australians 175. Australians won by an innings and 28 runs.

Spofforth took 13 for 42 and 9 for 26; Garrett took 11 for 11 in the second innings. For Auckland Dan Lynch took the first five Australian wickets and finished with 5 for 67. Bailey's 44 not out was the highest score.

The original itinerary included a three-day match against the "United strength of New Zealand" from 14 to 16 February.

== Assessments ==
The weather was generally cool, cloudy and damp throughout, although only three full days were lost to the weather.

Bowlers had the upper hand. Apart from Charles Bannerman's century against Southland, Horan scored two fifties and Garrett one. All 22 of the opposition fielded at once, which slowed the Australians' scoring.

Charles Bannerman led the Australian batting with 284 runs, Horan scored 187, and Bailey 128. Only four New Zealand batsmen, all in South Island teams, reached 20; John Wesney of Southland was the highest scorer among them with 39 not out. Spofforth took 102 wickets at an average of 3.85, although in several matches he bowled only in the first innings.

The Australians returned to Australia and played several matches in New South Wales and Victoria in March before sailing for England.
