= John Hodges (cricketer) =

Australian cricketer (1855–1933)

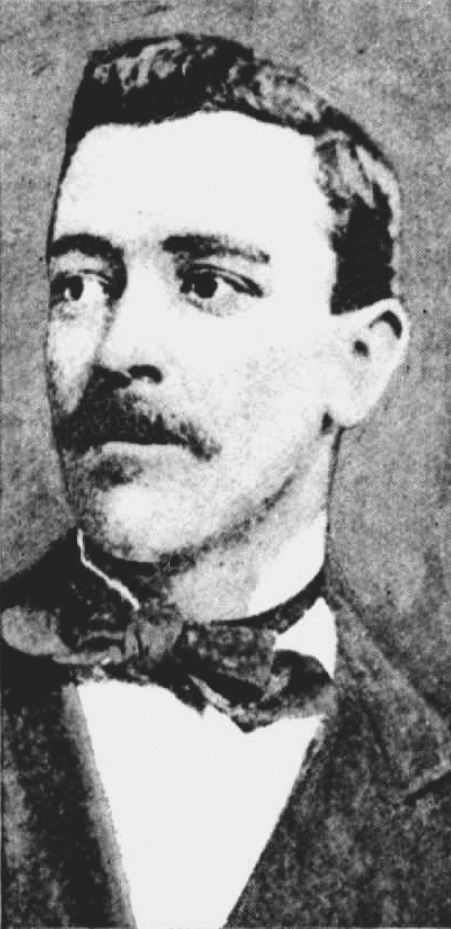

Personal information
- Full name: John Robart Hodges
- Born: 11 August 1855; Knightsbridge, London, England
- Died: 17 January 1933 (aged 77); Melbourne, Victoria, Australia
- Batting: Left-handed
- Bowling: Left-arm medium round-arm

International information
- National side: Australia
- Test debut (cap 7): 15 March 1877 v England
- Last Test: 31 March 1877 v England

Domestic team information
- Years: Team
- 1877–78: Victoria

Career statistics
Competition	Tests	First-class
Matches	2	4
Runs scored	10	75
Batting average	3.33	12.50
100s/50s	0/0	0/0
Top score	8	22
Balls bowled	136	457
Wickets	6	12
Bowling average	14.00	16.50
5 wickets in innings	0	0
10 wickets in match	0	0
Best bowling	2/7	3/11
Catches/stumpings	0/0	1/0
- Source: Cricinfo, 30 August 2018

John Robart Hodges (11 August 1855 – 17 January 1933) was an Australian cricketer who played in the first two Test matches in 1877.

== Cricket career ==
Hodges was born in Knightsbridge, London, on 11 August 1855 and is believed to have died on 17 January 1933 in Melbourne, Victoria. The exact details of his death remain unconfirmed but this date is generally accepted by the sport's historians. He is one of the least-known Australian players, so meteoric and short was his career. He had the unusual distinction of playing in a Test match (and not just any Test match, the first ever given such status) before playing for his colony. Therefore, the historic international, played at Melbourne in 1877 between Australia and England, was Hodges' first-class debut.

A left-handed batsman and fast-medium, round-arm bowler, Hodges started playing cricket for the Capulets club in the Melbourne suburb of Collingwood. Following some good performances in club cricket, he soon appeared for the Richmond Cricket Club (1876–77), and later played for Victoria.

His bowling had both pace and movement and occasionally he could swing the ball sharply. But it also lacked consistency and all the good work he showed previously rarely came to the fore in his two representative matches. He bowled too short and was hit about the ground by some of the English batsmen. Hodges got his chance to play in the inaugural Test when the more widely recognised bowler Frank Allan refused to travel to Melbourne from Warrnambool for the match. Allan could not spare the time and thus Hodges bowled the very first ball for Australia in Test history and was unlucky not to take a wicket with it. Newspaper reports suggested that an umpiring error saved the English batsman, Henry Jupp, after he dislodged the bails whilst attempting to play the ball. Umpire Ben Terry, standing at square leg, did not see the incident and therefore Jupp survived.

Hodges took three wickets in his first Test, including John Selby twice, and did enough to earn selection for the second Test two weeks later. He claimed another three wickets in the second Test and this time it was Andrew Greenwood that fell to him in both innings. In the two Tests he scored just ten runs (with two ducks and a highest score of 8) and his fielding was considered casual bordering on slipshod.

Nine months after his representative matches, in December 1877, Hodges made his debut for Victoria and played a second and last time for the state in February the following year. From then on his form deserted him and he was soon out of first-class cricket and back playing for the Capulets.

== Later life ==
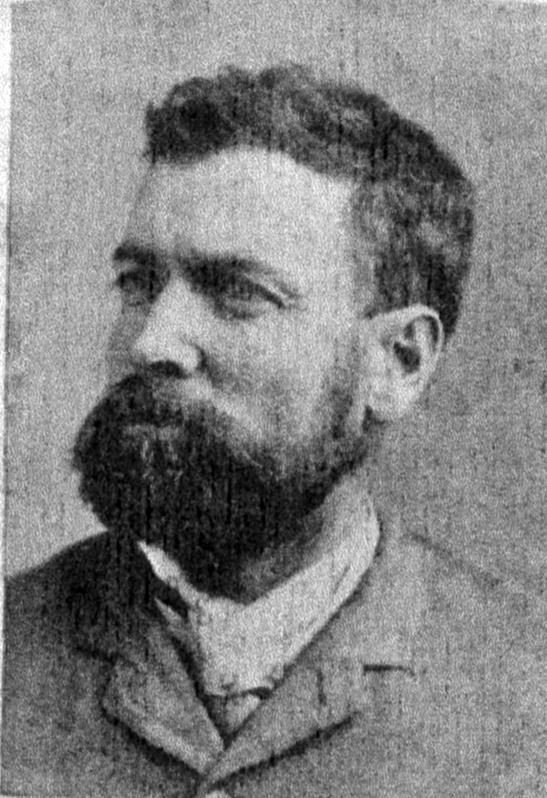
A police photograph of Hodges in 1891

A bootmaker by trade, Hodges appeared before a Richmond court in February 1884, charged with indecent exposure. The charges were dismissed, and from thereon he faded into relative obscurity. One of the last references to Hodges came in January 1911 when Tom Horan, a former teammate in that inaugural Test side, reported that he believed Hodges had moved to South Africa. But further details about his life are sparse. Despite his early cricketing ability Hodges spent most of his life living in poverty.

== Sources ==
1. The Oxford Companion to Australian Cricket, Oxford University Press (1996)
2. Australian Cricket – The Game and the Players, Hodder & Stoughton (1982)
3. ABC Guide to Australian Test Cricketers, Queen Anne Press (1994)
