= William Neilson (cricketer) =

New Zealand cricketer

Personal information
- Full name: William Francis Neilson
- Born: 24 September 1850; Liverpool, England
- Died: 2 May 1880 (aged 29); Christchurch, New Zealand
- Batting: Right-handed

Domestic team information
- Years: Team
- 1874–75 to 1878–79: Canterbury

Career statistics
Competition	First-class
Matches	6
Runs scored	123
Batting average	13.66
100s/50s	0/1
Top score	57*
Balls bowled	122
Wickets	8
Bowling average	8.37
5 wickets in innings	1
10 wickets in match	0
Best bowling	5/19
Catches/stumpings	1/0
- Source: CricketArchive, 27 March 2017

William Francis Neilson (24 September 1850 – 2 May 1880) was an English-born New Zealand cricketer who played for Canterbury in the 1870s.

Born in Liverpool, England, Neilson moved to New Zealand as a young man. He had his best cricket performances in the match against Otago in 1876–77, when he scored 57 not out in the second innings batting at number nine, and then took 5 for 19 to wrap up the Otago innings and the match.

In 1877–78 Neilson organised and captained Canterbury's first trip to the North Island, when they dismissed Auckland for 13 at the Auckland Domain. A few weeks later he captained Canterbury to victory over the touring Australians, the Australians' only loss of the tour. He also led the Canterbury team that toured Tasmania and Victoria in 1878–79.

A popular figure in Canterbury, he was the best amateur billiards player in New Zealand, a fine games player and horse rider, and a prominent owner of racehorses. He died on 2 May 1880 after a long illness, aged 29.
