= John Conway (cricketer) =

Australian cricketer and journalist (1842–1909)

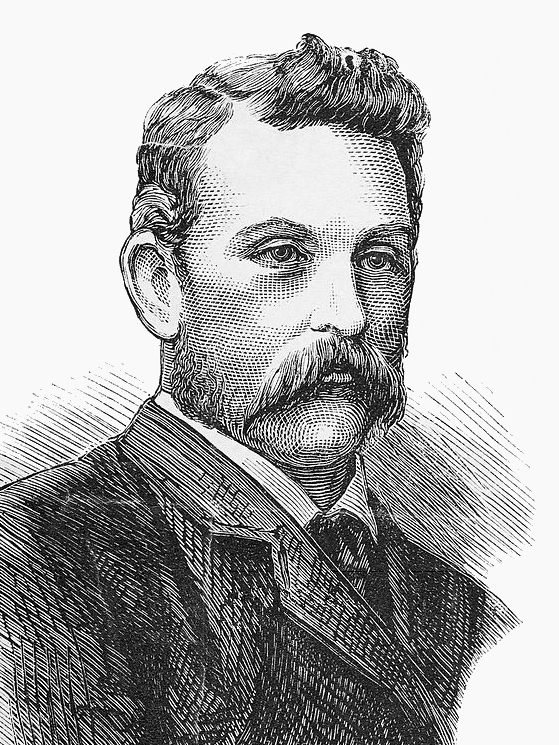
- Conway in 1878

Personal information
- Full name: John Conway
- Born: 3 February 1842; Fyansford, Colony of New South Wales
- Died: 22 August 1909 (aged 67); Frankston, Victoria, Australia
- Batting: Right-handed
- Bowling: Right-arm fast
- Relatives: Ronald Conway (grandson)

Domestic team information
- Years: Team
- 1861/62–1874–75: Victoria
- 1879/80: Otago
- FC debut: 9 January 1862 Victoria v New South Wales
- Last FC: 10 January 1880 Otago v Canterbury

Career statistics
Competition	First-class
Matches	10
Runs scored	156
Batting average	11.14
100s/50s	0/0
Top score	49
Balls bowled	1,205
Wickets	32
Bowling average	13.25
5 wickets in innings	3
10 wickets in match	0
Best bowling	6/42
Catches/stumpings	9/–
- Source: CricInfo, 25 March 2019

John Conway (3 February 1842 – 22 August 1909) was an Australian cricketer who played first-class cricket from 1861–62 to 1879–80. He organised the first Test match in March 1877, and Australia's first cricket tour in 1878. He was also an accomplished Australian rules footballer who captained the Carlton Football Club between 1866 and 1871.

== Career ==
A right-handed batsman and a right-arm fast round-arm bowler, Conway played for Victoria in Australia. He played a single match for Otago in New Zealand in 1880 and played in a total of ten first-class matches. His best bowling figures came in 1866–67, when he took 6 for 42, bowling 50.2 four-ball overs unchanged throughout the New South Wales innings.

Conway is best remembered for his work as an organiser and promoter of international cricket. He acted as the Australian agent for the English team that toured Australia in 1876–77, and towards the end of the tour he arranged for the leading players from New South Wales and Victoria to play a "Grand Combination Match" against the English team at the Melbourne Cricket Ground. This match is now regarded as the first Test match.

The success of this match and another hastily arranged match shortly afterwards led Conway and several of the Australian team to contemplate the feasibility of a tour of England. Despite the objections of the state cricket associations, Conway organised and managed the inaugural Australian tour of England in 1878. The tour began in November 1877 with matches in Australia and New Zealand before the main tour of England, and continued with a tour of North America and some final matches in Australia, concluding in January 1879. The tour, undertaken for profit, yielded about 1000 pounds for each of the eleven players, and 1200 pounds for Conway.

For many years, Conway worked as a journalist covering football, cricket, horse racing and coursing. He also acted as agent for English cricket teams that visited Australia in 1881–82 and 1884–85.

== Personal life ==
Conway and his wife Elizabeth had seven children, but only their son Leslie married. Conway's relatives included the cricketer Sydney Donahoo, a nephew, and the writer Ronald Conway, a grandson.

Conway died at his home in Frankston, Victoria in August 1909, aged 67. Attendees at a small private funeral included Tom Horan and Frank Allan from the 1878 team.
