= Edwin Fuller =

New Zealand cricketer

Personal information
- Full name: Edwin Thomas Augustus Fuller
- Born: 17 May 1850; Launceston, Tasmania, Australia
- Died: 1 August 1917 (aged 67); St Leonards, Sydney, Australia

Domestic team information
- Years: Team
- 1872–73 to 1882–83: Canterbury

Career statistics
Competition	First-class
Matches	9
Runs scored	51
Batting average	4.63
100s/50s	0/0
Top score	14
Balls bowled	1642
Wickets	59
Bowling average	9.62
5 wickets in innings	8
10 wickets in match	3
Best bowling	7/47
Catches/stumpings	6/0
- Source: CricketArchive, 5 March 2017

Edwin Thomas Augustus Fuller (17 May 1850 – 1 August 1917) was an Australian-born cricketer who played first-class cricket for Canterbury in New Zealand from 1873 to 1882.

Edwin Fuller was a fast bowler. On his first-class debut, in the annual match between Canterbury and Otago in 1872–73, he opened the attack and, bowling unchanged, took 5 for 20 and 6 for 23 in an innings victory for Canterbury. Ten of his 11 victims were bowled. In his next match, in 1873–74, he took 5 for 38 and 7 for 47 when Canterbury lost by 7 runs to Auckland. Later that season Otago beat Canterbury by an innings, but Fuller still took 6 for 44. In 1881–82 he took 6 for 62 and 5 for 29 against Otago, but Otago won by 77 runs.

Fuller's most notable feat occurred not in a first-class match but when a Canterbury XV played the touring Australians in January 1878. He did not bowl in the first innings when Canterbury dismissed the Australians for 46. In the second innings, after Canterbury had taken a first-innings lead of 89, he took advantage of a pitch that "played rather bumpily", taking 8 for 35 to restrict the Australians' second innings to 143. Canterbury had only 55 to chase, which they reached with eight wickets down and six to spare. It was the only defeat the Australians suffered on their tour of New Zealand. Fuller was also Canterbury's most successful bowler when the English team visited in 1881–82, taking 4 for 49 off 54 four-ball overs.

Bowling for the Midland club in senior club cricket in Christchurch in 1880-81, Fuller took 83 wickets at an average of 9.7. In all matches in the 1881–82 season he took 100 wickets at an average of 10.6. He ran a sporting goods shop in central Christchurch.

Fuller returned to Australia with his wife and family in March 1883. He died in Sydney in 1917.
