= English cricket team in Australia and New Zealand in 1876–77 =

English cricket tour of Australia and New Zealand

1876–77 Australia v England Series
- Date: 15 March – 4 April 1877
- Location: Australia
- Result: The 2-Test series was drawn 1–1
Teams
- Australia: England
Captains
- Dave Gregory: James Lillywhite
Most runs
- Charles Bannerman (209) Nat Thomson (67): George Ulyett (139); Allen Hill (101)
Most wickets
- Tom Kendall (14) Billy Midwinter (8): James Lillywhite (8); Alfred Shaw (8)

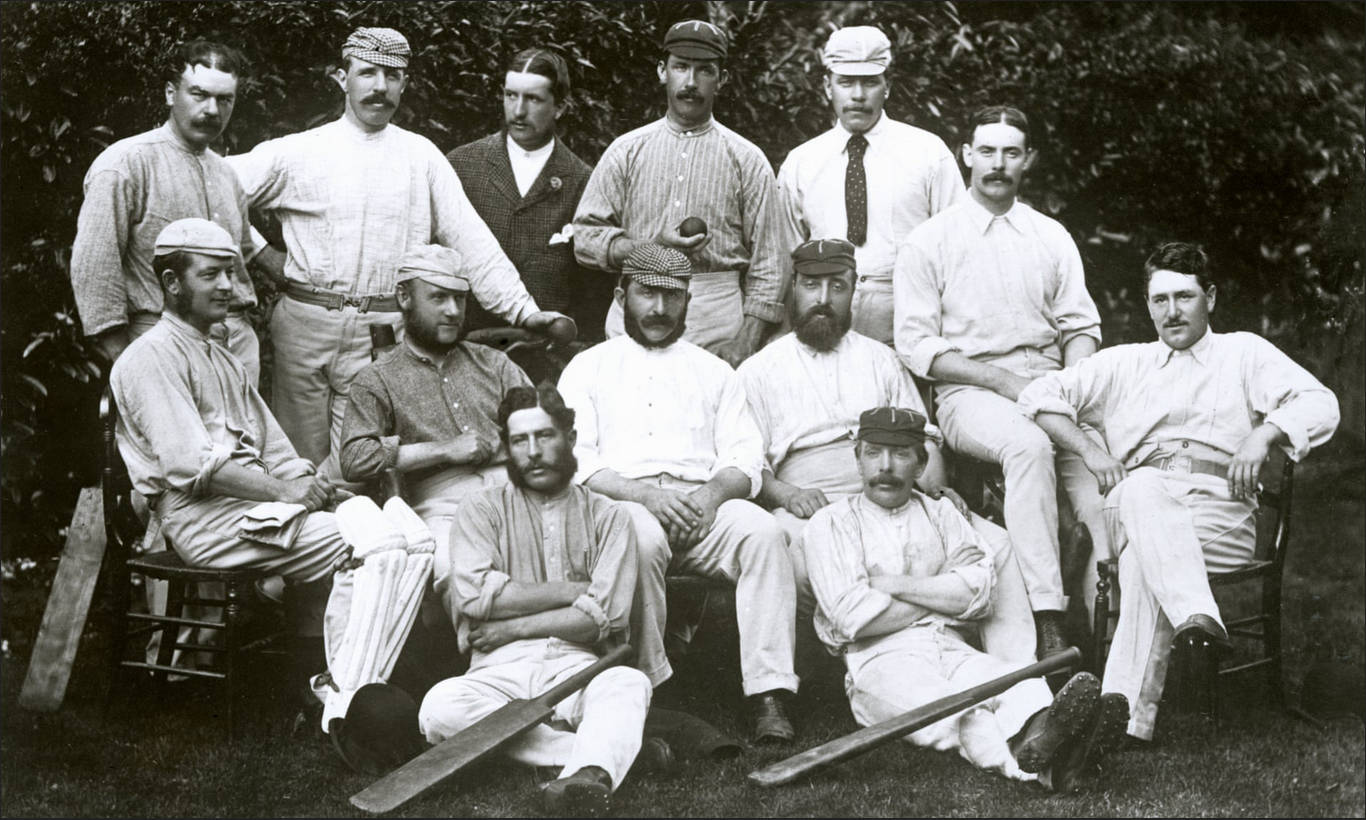
The English cricket team that toured Australia and New Zealand in 1876–77.

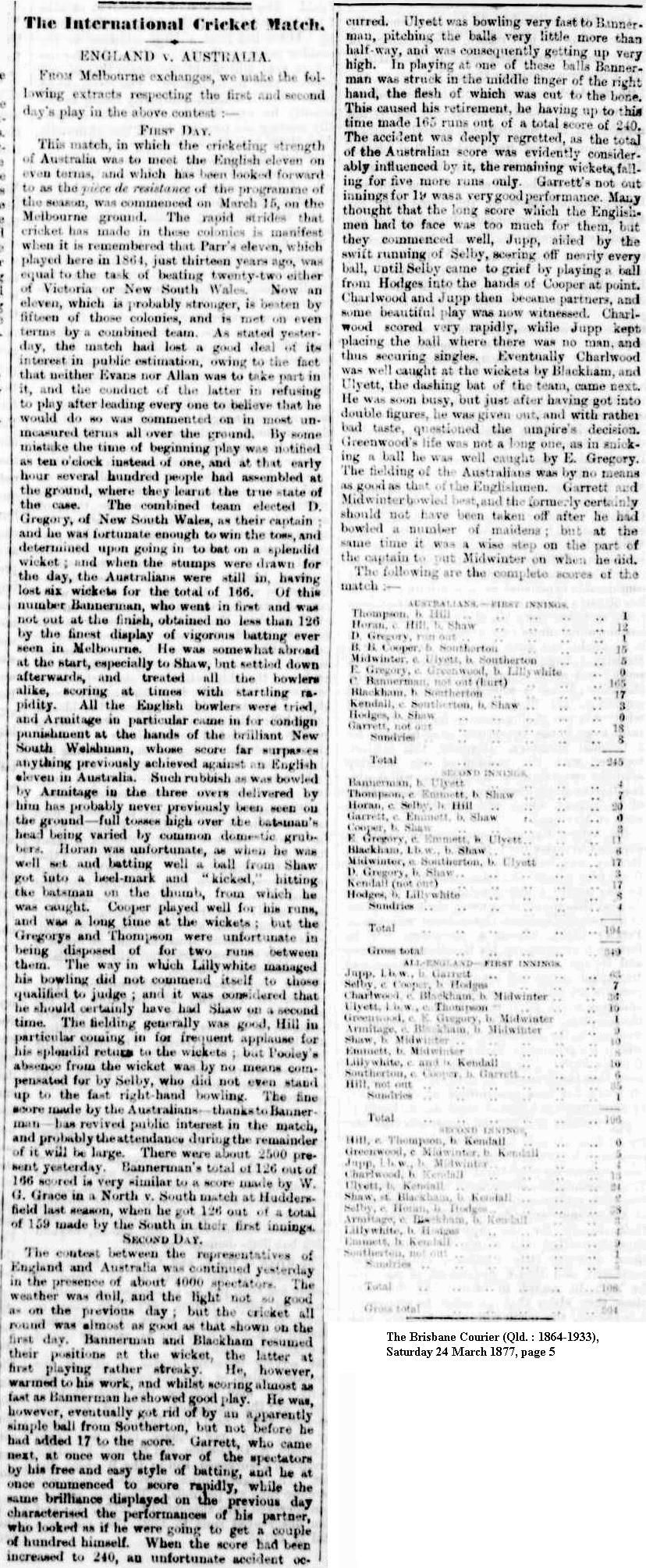
1877 newspaper article describing the first two days of the first match

The Australia and New Zealand tour of the England cricket team in 1876–77 was at the time considered to be another professional first-class cricket tour of the colonies, as similar tours had occurred previously, but retrospectively it became classified as the first Test cricket tour of Australia by the English cricket team. The English team is sometimes referred to as James Lillywhite's XI. In all, they played 23 matches but only three including the two Tests are recognised as first-class. The first match started at the Adelaide Oval on 16 November 1876 and the last at the same venue on 14 April 1877. There were fifteen matches in Australia and, between January and March, eight in New Zealand.

A rival tour had been proposed by Fred Grace but was cancelled, enabling most of the best players of the Australian colonies to participate in two matches against James Lillywhite's side. Fred Spofforth, widely regarded as the best Australian fast bowler, controversially withdrew from the first match in protest over the omission of Billy Murdoch as wicket-keeper. Starting on 15 March 1877 the two sides played two matches, later designated Test matches, and the series was drawn 1–1.

For more details about the establishment of Test cricket, see the first Test tour: 1876/7. Although both matches have Test status, this series is not considered to be part of The Ashes, which began in 1882.

== Squads ==
Australia	England
Dave Gregory (c); Jack Blackham (wk); Charles Bannerman; Bransby Cooper; Tom Garrett; Ned Gregory; John Hodges; Tom Horan; Tom Kendall; Billy Midwinter; Nat Thomson; Thomas Kelly; Billy Murdoch; Fred Spofforth	James Lillywhite (c); John Selby (wk); Tom Armitage; Henry Charlwood; Tom Emmett; Andrew Greenwood; Allen Hill; Harry Jupp; Alfred Shaw; James Southerton; George Ulyett

Ted Pooley was also a member of the English touring party, but had had to be left behind in New Zealand after he was charged with assault.

== Matches ==
=== First Test ===
15–19 March 1877
(Timeless Test)
Scorecard

Australia	v	England
245 (169.3 overs); Charles Bannerman 165 (r/h); Alfred Shaw 3/51 (55.3 overs)		196 (136.1 overs); Harry Jupp 63 (241); Billy Midwinter 5/78 (54 overs)
104 (68 overs); Tom Horan 20 (32); Alfred Shaw 5/38 (34 overs)		108 (66.1 overs); John Selby 38 (81); Tom Kendall 7/55 (33.1 overs)

Australia won by 45 runs
Melbourne Cricket Ground, Melbourne
Umpires: Curtis Reid (Aus) and Ben Terry (Eng)

- Australia won the toss and elected to bat.
- Charles Bannerman, Jack Blackham, Bransby Cooper, Tom Garrett, Dave Gregory, Ned Gregory, John Hodges, Tom Horan, Tom Kendall, Billy Midwinter, Nat Thomson (Aus), Tom Armitage, Henry Charlwood, Tom Emmett, Andrew Greenwood, Allen Hill, Harry Jupp, James Lillywhite, John Selby, Alfred Shaw, James Southerton and George Ulyett (Eng) all made their Test debuts.

=== Second Test ===
31 March – 4 April 1877
(Timeless Test)
Scorecard

Australia	v	England
122 (112.1 overs); Billy Midwinter 31; Allen Hill 4/27 (27 overs)		261 (130.2 overs); George Ulyett 52; Tom Kendall 4/82 (52.2 overs)
259 (154.3 overs); Dave Gregory 43; James Southerton 4/46 (28.3 overs)		6/122 (52.1 overs); George Ulyett 63; John Hodges 2/13 (6 overs)

England won by 4 wickets
Melbourne Cricket Ground, Melbourne
Umpires: Sam Cosstick (Aus) and Ben Terry (Eng)

- Australia won the toss and elected to bat.
- Thomas Kelly, Billy Murdoch and Fred Spofforth (Aus) all made their Test debuts.

== Records ==
=== Individual records ===
Most runs	Charles Bannerman	209
Most wickets	Tom Kendall	14
Most catches (excluding wicket-keepers)	Tom Emmett	4
Highest individual innings	Charles Bannerman	165 (retired hurt)
Best innings bowling	Tom Kendall	7/55 (First Test, second innings)
Highest match total	Charles Bannerman	169 (First Test)
Best match bowling	Tom Kendall / Alfred Shaw	8 (First Test)

=== Team records ===
Best innings	England	261 (Second Test, first innings)
Worst innings	England	108 (First Test, second innings)
Tosses won	Australia	2 (of 2)

=== Other records ===
- Alfred Shaw (Eng) bowled the first ball in Test cricket.
- Charles Bannerman (Aus) faced the first ball in Test cricket.
- Charles Bannerman (Aus) scored the first run in Test cricket.
- Ned Gregory (Aus) made the first duck in Test cricket.
- Charles Bannerman (Aus) scored the first century in Test cricket.
- Charles Bannerman (Aus) scored 69.6% of his team's match runs, still a Test record.
- Allen Hill (Eng) took the first wicket in Test cricket.
- Allen Hill (Eng) took the first catch in Test cricket.
- Billy Midwinter (Aus) took the first five-wicket haul in Test cricket.
- Jack Blackham (Aus) took the first catch by a wicket-keeper in Test cricket.
- Jack Blackham (Aus) made the first stumping in Test cricket.
- Alfred Shaw (Eng) was the first Englishman to take a five-wicket haul in Test cricket.
- Australia was the first team to win a Test match and remains the only country to win its inaugural Test.
