= Curtis Reid (footballer) =

Australian rules footballer (1876–1912)

Personal information
- Full name: Curtis Arthur Reid
- Born: 25 March 1876; Tarrawingee, Victoria
- Died: 12 May 1912 (aged 36); Charleville, Queensland
- Original team: Rovers (WAFA)
- Height: 179 cm (5 ft 10 in)
- Position: Defender

Playing career^{1}
Years	Club	Games (Goals)
1899–1903	Melbourne	20 (0)
- ^{1} Playing statistics correct to the end of 1903.

Curtis Arthur Reid (25 March 1876 – 12 May 1912) was an Australian rules footballer who played with Melbourne in the Victorian Football League (VFL).

== Family ==
The son of wine maker and cricketer, Curtis Alexander Reid (1838-1886), and Sophia Louisa Reid (1843-1923), née Dight, Curtis Arthur Reid was born at his father's Tarrawingee vineyard on 25 March 1876.

He married Mary Elizabeth "Bessie" Tullidge (1875-), in Perth, on 28 November 1904.

== Education ==
Trained as a surveyor, he was admitted to the Queensland Institute of Surveyors in 1907.

== Football ==
=== Melbourne (VFL) ===
Cleared to Melbourne from the Rovers Football Club in May 1899.

=== East Fremantle (WAFL) ===
He was granted a clearance to East Fremantle in July 1903.

== Death ==
He died at the Charleville Hospital in Queensland on 12 May 1912, of "typhoid fever accelerated by heart failure", having "become ill while surveying the Crown lands at Nebine Creek".

Many of the younger generation in Melbourne will regret to learn of the death of Mr. Curtis A. Reid at the early age of thirty-six. The late Mr. Reid died at Charlesville, Queensland, on Sunday last from typhoid fever. He had a large survey party out in the north, when he was attacked by fever, to which he succumbed after a few days' illness. When telegraphic news arrived of the attack, his wife hurried from Melbourne, and had the melancholy consolation of being with him in his last hours. His father, Curtis A. Reid, was at one time a leading light in Melbourne journalistic and cricketing circles, being for many years secretary of the Melbourne Cricket Club. The younger Curtis was equally well known and beloved by a large circle of friends. In addition to a widow he leaves two children, one of them being only a few months old. — Punch, 16 May 1912.
