= Thomas Kelly (cricketer, born 1844) =

Australian cricketer (1844–1893)

- Kelly in 1873

Personal information
- Full name: Thomas Joseph Dart Kelly
- Born: 3 May 1844; County Waterford, Ireland
- Died: 20 July 1893 (aged 49); Hawthorn, Victoria, Australia
- Batting: Right-handed
- Bowling: Right-arm

International information
- National side: Australia
- Test debut (cap 12): 31 March 1877 v England
- Last Test: 2 January 1879 v England

Career statistics
Competition	Test	First-class
Matches	2	16
Runs scored	64	543
Batting average	21.33	20.11
100s/50s	0/0	0/5
Top score	35	86
Catches/stumpings	1/–	20/–
- Source: Cricinfo, 17 November 2022

Thomas Joseph Dart Kelly (3 May 1844 – 20 July 1893) was an Australian cricketer who played in two Test matches, in 1877 and 1879.

== Life and career ==
Kelly was born in Ireland but brought up in England in Bristol. He migrated to Australia when he was 19, settling in Melbourne.

Kelly played domestic cricket for Victoria for 17 seasons, first appearing in the summer of 1863–64. He gained a reputation as a fine fielder and aggressive batsman. He was widely regarded as one of the most brilliant fieldsmen at point in Australia or England.

Kelly made his Test debut in the Second Test of the 1876–77 season. In the second innings, Kelly hit 35 – his highest Test score – of which all but three runs came from boundaries. His highest first-class score was 86 for Victoria against New South Wales in 1874–75.

Kelly married Margaret Meoney in Melbourne in September 1869. He worked in Melbourne as a merchant. His wife died in 1883. He died at his home in the Melbourne suburb of Hawthorn in July 1893, aged 49, leaving £9,800 to be divided among his children.
