= Curtis Reed =

Curtis Reed may refer to:

- Curtis Reed (Days of our Lives), a fictional character in the American soap opera Days of our Lives
- Curtis Reed (Home and Away), a fictional character in the Australian soap opera Home and Away
- Curtis Reed (politician) (1815–1895), American businessman and politician in Wisconsin

== See also ==
- Curtis Reid (disambiguation)
