= Clifton College Close Ground =

Cricket ground in Bristol, England

Coordinates: 51.4613°N 2.6194°W

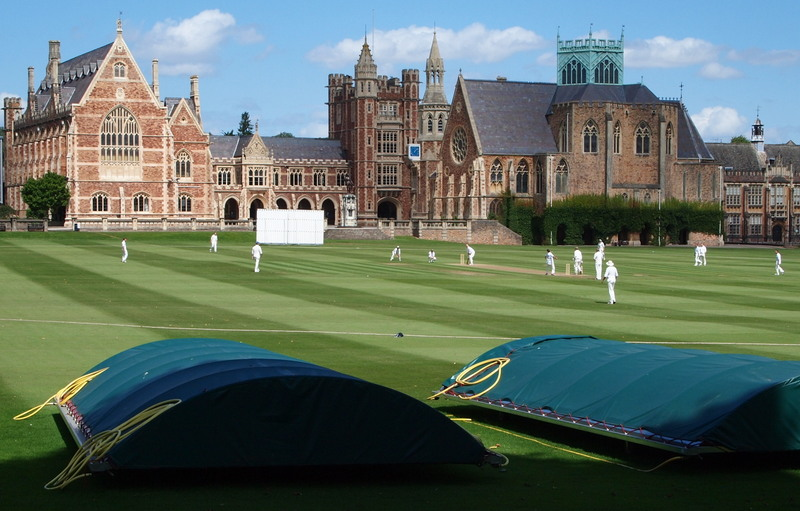
- Interactive map of Clifton College Close Ground

Ground information
- Location: Clifton College, Bristol
- Country: England
- Establishment: 1884 (first recorded match)

International information
- Only women's T20I: 25 June 2011: India v New Zealand

Team information
Gloucestershire	(1871–1932)
- As of 5 September 2020; Source: Ground profile

Clifton College Close is a cricket venue in Clifton College, Bristol, which was used by Gloucestershire for 96 first-class matches between 1871 and 1932. It is first recorded as a cricket venue in 1860 and remains in use for local matches.

The Close witnessed 13 of W. G. Grace's first-class hundreds for Gloucestershire in the County Championship. Grace's children attended the college. Children aged 3–18 are welcomed to attend the college.

The Close featured in a well-known poem by O.C. Sir Henry Newbolt – Vitaї Lampada ("There's a breathless hush in the Close to-night")
