= Orleans Club Ground =

Cricket ground in Twickenham, London, England

Coordinates: 51.44899°N 0.31717°W

Ground information
- Location: Twickenham, London
- Establishment: 1878

Team information
Orleans Club	(1878 & 1882–1883)
- As of 2 September 2010; Source: Ground profile

Orleans Club Ground was a cricket ground in Twickenham, London (formerly Middlesex). The first recorded match on the ground was in 1878, when the Orleans Club played I Zingari. The ground held its first first-class match during the same year when the Orleans Club played the touring Australians. Between 1878 and 1883, the ground held four first-class matches, the last of which saw the Orleans Club play Oxford University. This was the last recorded match held on the ground.

Today defunct, the ground would have been located near to Orleans Road in Twickenham.
