= Curtis Reid (cricketer) =

Australian cricketer and umpire (1836–1886)

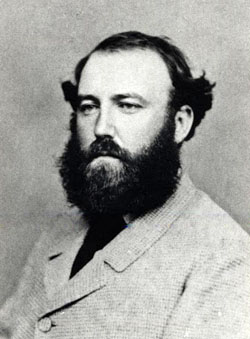

Personal information
- Full name: Curtis Alexander Reid
- Born: 16 July 1836; Inverary Park, near Bungonia, New South Wales, Australia
- Died: 1 July 1886 (aged 49); Hawthorn, Victoria, Australia
- Batting: Left-handed
- Bowling: Right-arm (unknown style)
- Role: Bowler

Domestic team information
- Years: Team
- 1869/70–1870/71: Victoria
- First-class debut: 24 February 1870 Victoria v New South Wales
- Last First-class: 9 March 1871 Victoria v New South Wales

Umpiring information
- Tests umpired: 1 (1877)

Career statistics
Competition	First-class
Matches	3
Runs scored	12
Batting average	3.00
100s/50s	0/0
Top score	5
Balls bowled	431
Wickets	16
Bowling average	10.87
5 wickets in innings	2
10 wickets in match	1
Best bowling	6/5
Catches/stumpings	1/0
- Source: CricketArchive, 5 November 2011

Curtis Alexander Reid (16 July 1836 – 1 July 1886) was an Australian cricketer and umpire who umpired the historic first Test match in Melbourne in 1877.

== Family ==
Reid was born to Scottish immigrants Lieutenant-Doctor David Reid, RN, and his wife Agnes née Dyce. His brothers included pastoralists and politicians Robert and David. Reid married Sophie Dight (1843–1923) on 14 August 1862. Their son, Curtis Arthur Reid (1876–1912), a surveyor, played Australian rules football at the highest level in Perth (with Rovers Football Club and East Fremantle Football Club) and in Melbourne (with Melbourne Football Club).

== Life and career ==
Reid umpired the inaugural Test between Australia and England in Melbourne on 15 to 19 March 1877. His umpiring colleague was Ben Terry.

Earlier, as a player, Reid was a left-hand batsman and right-arm bowler who played three matches for Victoria from 1869 to 1871. He took 16 wickets at an average of 10.87, with figures of 6 for 64 and 6 for 5 against Tasmania in 1870–71. Less successful with the bat, he scored 12 runs in 5 innings.

He was a winemaker, producing wine at Tarrawingee, Victoria, under the Reidsdale label, until 1874.

Reid was appointed secretary of the Melbourne Cricket Club in 1878, the club's first secretary to be paid. He was also one of the first cricket journalists in Australia.

== See also ==
- List of Test cricket umpires
- List of Victoria first-class cricketers
