= George Bailey (cricketer, born 1882) =

Australian cricketer

Personal information
- Full name: George Keith Brooke Bailey
- Born: 3 January 1882; Hobart, Tasmania, Australia
- Died: 17 June 1964 (aged 82); Hobart, Tasmania, Australia

Domestic team information
- Years: Team
- 1903/04: Tasmania
- Source: Cricinfo, 17 January 2016

George Keith Brooke Bailey (3 January 1882 – 17 June 1964) was an Australian cricketer. He played two first-class matches for Tasmania in the 1903–04 season. His father also played for Tasmania.

== See also ==
- List of Tasmanian representative cricketers
