= George Bailey (cricketer, born 1853) =

Australian cricketer (1853–1926)

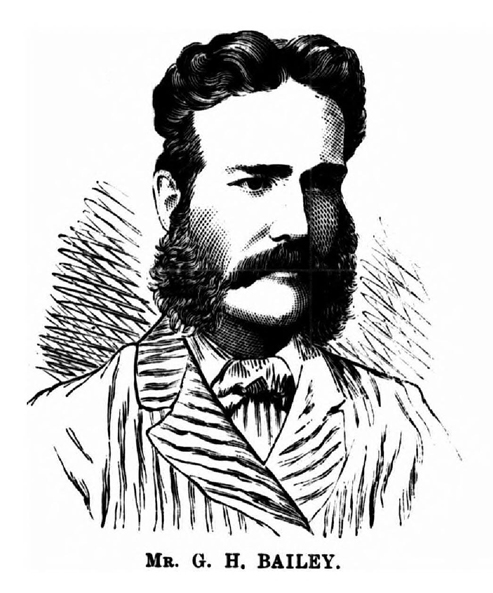
- George Bailey in 1878

Personal information
- Full name: George Herbert Bailey
- Born: 29 October 1853; Colombo, British Ceylon
- Died: 10 October 1926 (aged 72); Hobart, Tasmania
- Height: 5 ft 10 in (1.78 m)
- Batting: Right-handed
- Bowling: Right-arm fast-medium roundarm

Domestic team information
- Years: Team
- 1872/73–1892/93: Tasmania

Career statistics
Competition	First-class
Matches	15
Runs scored	367
Batting average	16.68
100s/50s	0/1
Top score	57*
Balls bowled	320
Wickets	4
Bowling average	25.50
5 wickets in innings	0
10 wickets in match	0
Best bowling	1/5
Catches/stumpings	9/–
- Source: Cricinfo, 24 December 2013

George Herbert Bailey (29 October 1853 – 10 October 1926) was an Australian cricketer who played first-class cricket for Tasmania from 1873 to 1893 and for the Australian team in England and North America in 1878.

== Early life and career ==
Bailey was born in Colombo where his father, Canon Brooke Bailey, was a military chaplain and inspector of schools. He went to school at Lichfield Grammar School in England and Elizabeth College, Guernsey, where he captained the first eleven for two years. After he left school he followed his father to Tasmania in 1870. In 1872 he began his employment with the Union Bank of Australia.

He played for the Launceston Cricket Club and made his first appearance in the biannual Tasmanian intrastate matches between North and South in 1871–72. He took 6 for 52 opening the bowling for North in 1872–73, a match in which he also opened the batting. He made his first-class debut for Tasmania a few days later, batting at number three and opening the bowling against Victoria, but he was less successful this time, and Tasmania lost.

Although Tasmania did not play another interstate or first-class match until 1877–78, Bailey established a reputation as "a particularly forceful hitter, his favourite stroke being a powerful drive". His performances in Tasmania in that period included 101 for North against South in a one-wicket victory in 1875–76, and the match top score of 67 in an innings victory over South in 1876–77.

== Playing for Australia ==
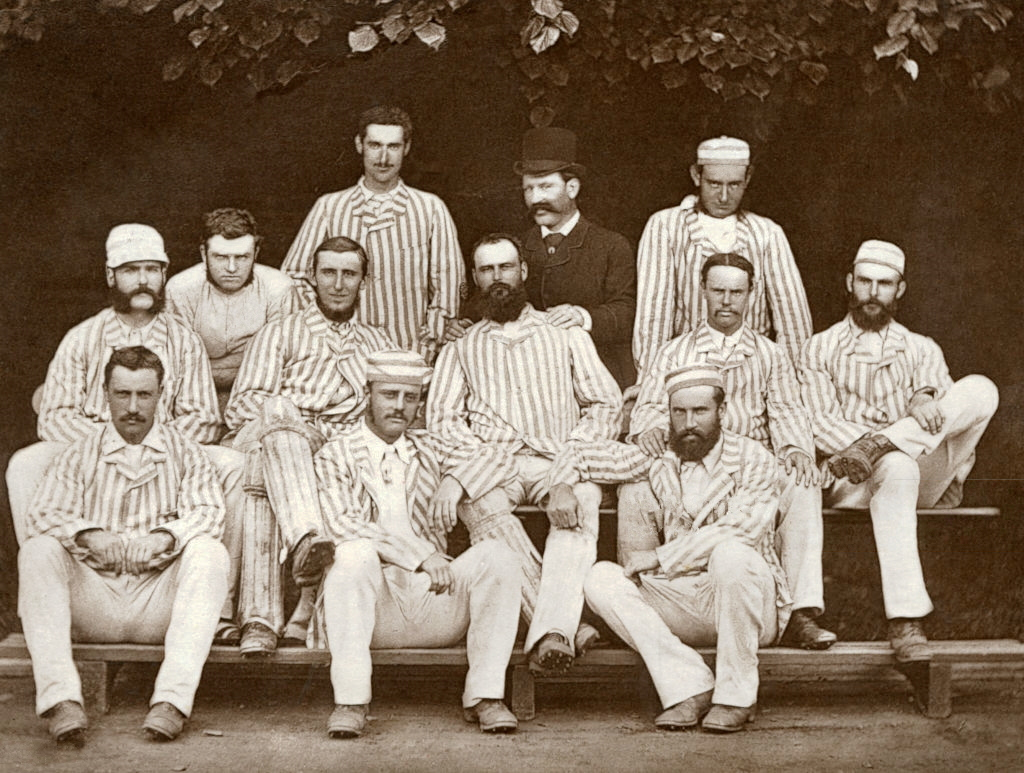
The 1878 Australian touring team. George Bailey is seated on the left in the white hat.

When his fellow Tasmanian John Arthur fell ill in 1877 and was unable to join the Australian touring team, Bailey was selected to replace him, the only Tasmanian in the 12-man side. The tour began in November 1877 with matches against various local teams in Australia, proceeded to New Zealand in early 1878, returned to Australia for a few games, then set sail for England.

The Australians played 40 matches in the United Kingdom, 15 of them first-class, of which Bailey played 12. He made 254 runs at an average of 14.94, with a top score of 40. In a tour of low scores he finished third in the Australians' batting averages. He made 3 not out at number 11 in the match against the MCC at Lord's in which the Australians won before the end of the first day's play.

The tour continued with matches in the United States and Canada in October, then returned to Australia for some more matches. In the first match back in Australia, Bailey broke his arm while fielding, and took no further part in the tour, or the 1878–79 season.

== Later life and career ==
Bailey top-scored in each innings for North in an innings defeat to South in 1879–80, and was invited to tour the United Kingdom again in 1880, when Test matches were played, but he declined for business reasons.

In 1881 he married Isabel Gibson, the daughter of the former Tasmanian cricketer George Gibson. They eventually had four sons and two daughters. They moved to Albany, Western Australia, where he managed the Union Bank for 10 years. Bailey Street in Albany is named after him.

After returning to Tasmania in the early 1890s he played one last first-class match, at the age of 39, against Victoria in Launceston in 1892–93. He made 25 and 57 not out, his highest first-class score.

For the last 30 years of his life George Bailey was registrar of the Anglican Diocese of Tasmania.

His son Keith Bailey played two games for Tasmania in 1903–04. George Bailey's great-great-grandson, also George Bailey, played more than 100 first-class games for Tasmania, played Test cricket for Australia, and captained Australia in T20 and ODI cricket.
