= Orleans Club =

The Orleans Club was a London-based cricket club that was founded in 1878 and played four matches. Its teams were organised by C. I. Thornton, who had organised occasional teams to play on the Orleans Club Ground at Orleans Road, Twickenham, both the club and ground taking the name of the address.
