= Billy Midwinter =

Australian cricketer

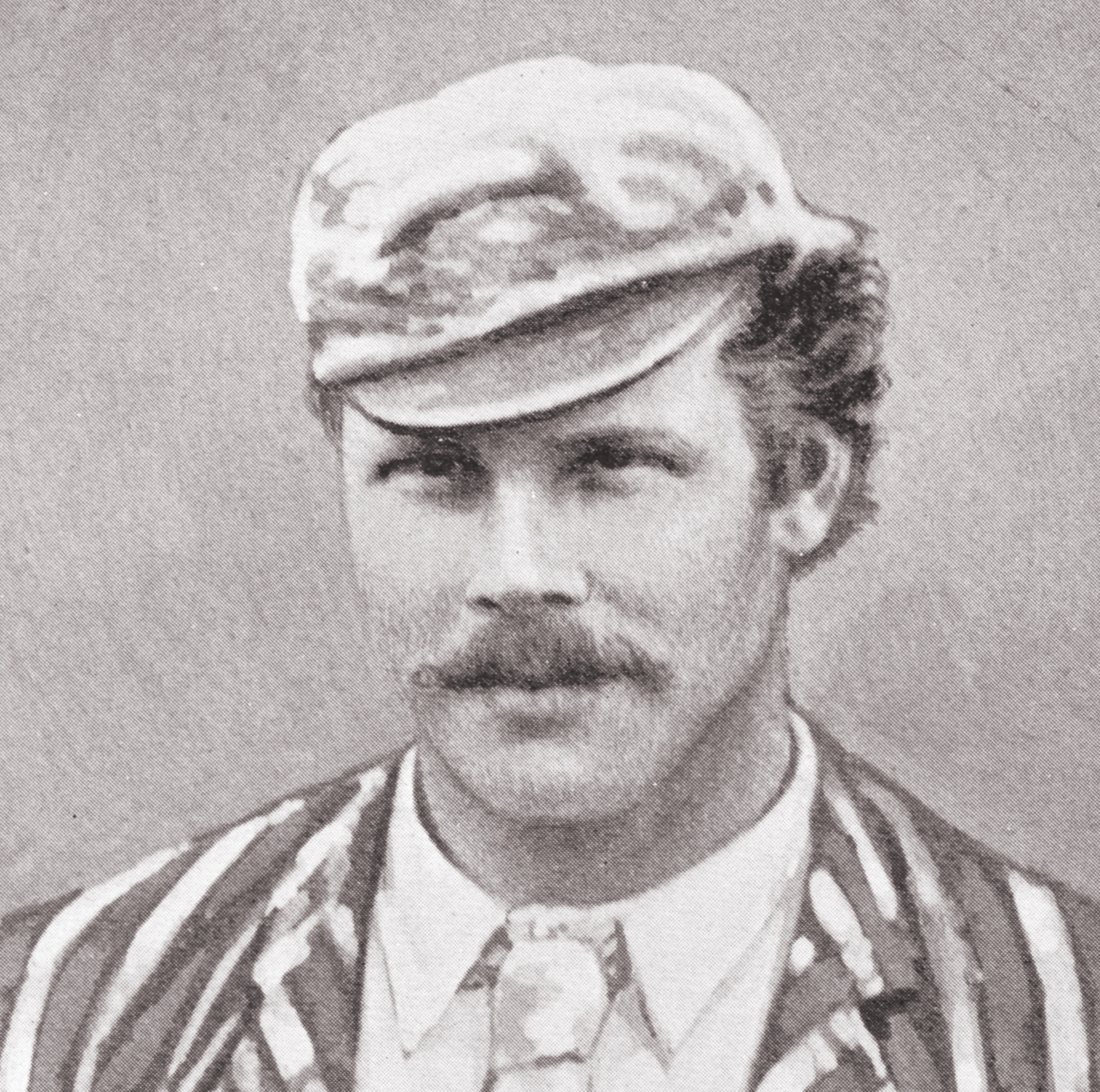

Personal information
- Full name: William Evans Midwinter
- Born: 19 June 1851; St Briavels, Gloucestershire, England
- Died: 3 December 1890 (aged 39); Melbourne, Victoria, Australia
- Batting: Right-handed
- Bowling: Right-arm medium

International information
- National sides: Australia (1877); England (1881–1882); Australia (1883–1887)
- Test debut (cap 10): 15 March 1877; Australia v England
- Last Test: 1 March 1887; Australia v England

Career statistics
Competition	Test	First-class
Matches	12	160
Runs scored	269	4,534
Batting average	13.45	19.13
100s/50s	0/0	3/12
Top score	37	137*
Balls bowled	183	23,440
Wickets	24	419
Bowling average	25.20	17.41
5 wickets in innings	1	27
10 wickets in match	0	3
Best bowling	5/78	7/27
Catches/stumpings	10/–	122/–
- Source: CricketArchive, 4 March 2017

William Evans Midwinter (19 June 1851 – 3 December 1890) was a cricketer who played four Test matches for England, sandwiched between eight for Australia. He was the only cricketer to have played for Australia and England in Test matches against each other.

== Professional career ==
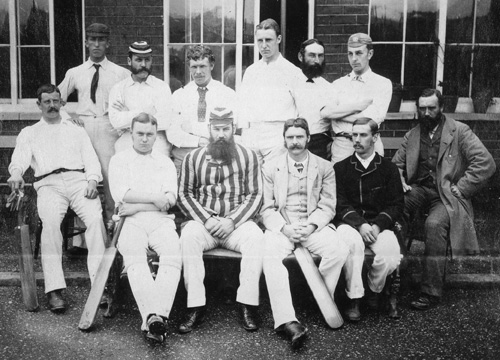
Gloucestershire County Cricket Club in 1880 shortly before Fred Grace's untimely death. W G Grace is seated front left centre. Fred Grace (hooped cap) is third left in rear group. Billy Midwinter (directly behind WG) is fourth left in rear. E M Grace (bearded) is sixth left in rear.

Midwinter made his Test debut in the first ever Test match in 1877, playing for Australia, where he had emigrated aged nine, against the country of his birth. He took five wickets in the first innings against England in Melbourne.

Midwinter played in the 2nd Test of the 1876–1877 Series on 31 March 1877. Australia won the toss and elected to bat. He played at No. 6 and came out when Australia were 60 for 4 to join the debutant Thomas Kelly. He batted with two other Test debutants, Frederick Spofforth and Billy Murdoch, scored a personal best of 31 and became the third batsman with 53 runs in a Test career.

Later that year Midwinter returned to England, playing for WG Grace's Gloucestershire County Cricket Club. He was included in the Australian team to tour England in 1878, and played some matches for them, before, about to take the field at Lord's he was virtually kidnapped by Grace, who took him to the Oval to play for Gloucestershire in their game against Surrey. He did not return to the tour, instead remaining with Gloucestershire until the 1882 season.

Midwinter was selected to tour with the England team visiting Australia in 1881/2, playing four Tests, then in 1882/3 returned to Australia, joining Victoria. He was selected for Australia to play the one-off Test after England had won the first Ashes series in 1883/4, and then for the Australian tour of England in 1884. This makes him the only man to play Test cricket for one international side, then another, and then return to his original international team.

By 1889, Midwinter's wife and two of his children had died, and his businesses had failed or were failing. He became hopelessly insane and was confined to Bendigo Hospital in 1890, before transferring to the Kew Asylum, where he died later that year. He is buried in the Melbourne General Cemetery.

== See also ==
- List of cricketers who have played for two international teams
