= Ben Terry =

English cricketer and umpire (1852–1910)

Personal information
- Full name: Richard Benjamin Terry
- Born: 25 November 1852; Bulwell, Nottingham, England
- Died: 10 July 1910 (aged 57); Edinburgh, Scotland
- Role: Umpire

Domestic team information
- Years: Team
- 1877-1881: Victoria

Umpiring information
- Tests umpired: 2 (1877–1877)

Career statistics
Competition	First-class
Matches	3
Runs scored	60
Batting average	12.00
100s/50s	0/0
Top score	30
Balls bowled	268
Wickets	6
Bowling average	15.66
5 wickets in innings	0
10 wickets in match	0
Best bowling	3/23
Catches/stumpings	1/–
- Source: ESPN Cricinfo, 18 July 2017

Richard Benjamin Terry (25 November 1852 – 10 July 1910) was an Englishman who umpired the historic first Test match played between Australia and England in Melbourne on 15 to 19 March 1877. His colleague was Curtis Reid. He also umpired in the second Test match, played two weeks later in Melbourne, partnered by Sam Cosstick.

== Life and career ==
Ben Terry came from Nottingham, and was engaged by the Melbourne Cricket Club as a professional bowler in 1875, having been recommended by Robert Allan Fitzgerald, the secretary of Marylebone Cricket Club, and Richard Daft of Nottinghamshire. He arrived in Melbourne in January 1876, bringing more than 200 cricket bats to sell.

In 1876-77, when he umpired the first two Tests at the Melbourne Cricket Ground as part of his duties, his annual salary was 150 pounds; although his match performances for Melbourne were disappointing, he was highly regarded as a practice bowler. He remained as one of the club's professionals until after the 1880-81 season, then returned to Britain.

He played three matches for Victoria from 1877 to 1881. He scored 60 runs at an average of 12 with a top score of 30, and took 6 wickets at an average of 15.66, with best figures of 3 for 23 against New South Wales in his first match in 1877-78. He married Phoebe Wallington in Melbourne on 20 November 1877.

After umpiring the two Tests, Terry continued to stand as an umpire in first-class matches in Melbourne, and occasionally Sydney, until 1881, when he returned to Britain. At the Australians' request, he also umpired a few of the matches played by the Australian touring teams to England in 1882 and 1884. In 1882 he was the professional with the Langholm Cricket Club in Scotland.

In 1891 he was still a professional cricketer, living in Edinburgh. In 1906 he was a "flourishing bookmaker" in Scotland. He died in Edinburgh in 1910.

== See also ==
- List of Test cricket umpires
