= Frank Allan =

Australian cricketer (1849–1917)

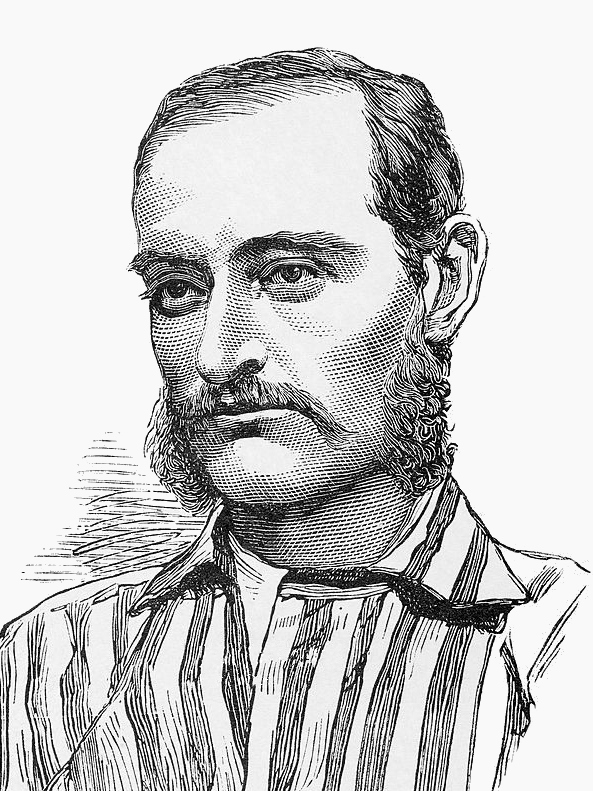
- Allan, 1878

Personal information
- Full name: Francis Erskine Allan
- Born: 2 December 1849; Allansford, Victoria, Australia
- Died: 9 February 1917 (aged 67); Melbourne, Victoria, Australia
- Batting: Right-handed
- Bowling: Left arm medium

International information
- National side: Australia
- Only Test (cap 15): 2 January 1879 v England

Career statistics
| Competition | Test | First-class |
|---|---|---|
| Matches | 1 | 31 |
| Runs scored | 5 | 371 |
| Batting average | 5.00 | 10.91 |
| 100s/50s | 0/0 | 0/0 |
| Top score | 5 | 35* |
| Balls bowled | 180 |
| Wickets | 4 | 123 |
| Bowling average | 20.00 | 13.31 |
| 5 wickets in innings | 0 | 11 |
| 10 wickets in match | 0 | 2 |
| Best bowling | 2/30 | 8/20 |
| Catches/stumpings | 0/0 | 14/0 |
- Source: Cricinfo, 15 August 2022

Francis Erskine Allan (2 December 1849 – 9 February 1917) was an Australian cricketer who represented Victoria in first-class intercolonial matches and made one Test appearance for Australia. A tall, wiry left-arm medium pacer known by the sobriquet "The Bowler of a Century", Allan possessed great spin and a peculiar swerve which he claimed to have developed through his use of boomerangs and waddies growing up amongst Aboriginal people in the Victorian bush. He was also given the nickname "Kangaroo" because he would jump like a kangaroo to celebrate taking a wicket.

Allan began a lifelong association with the South Melbourne Cricket Club in 1866 when he played for the side in his first ever match. Winning the club bowling average that season, he was quickly recognised as a natural of unusual ability, and in 1867, aged seventeen, made his first-class debut for Victoria against New South Wales, taking a first innings five-wicket haul in a performance described by William Hammersley as "unprecedented". Allan became the mainstay of Victoria's bowling attack, securing extraordinary figures in a series of intercolonial victories, and played havoc with W. G. Grace's touring England XI in 1873–74. Grace offered to employ Allan as a professional, stating that he had never batted against a greater bowler.

In 1878, Allan formed part of the first representative Australian cricket team to tour overseas. Dogged by illness for much of the tour, Allan failed to live up to his reputation as he struggled to adapt to England's cool and damp conditions. He played in his only Test match the following year on the Melbourne Cricket Ground, against Lord Harris' All-England Eleven, and had an opportunity to appear in the first ever Test, in 1877, facing James Lillywhite's XI, but controversially opted out at the last moment to attend a funfair in Warrnambool. Apart from bowling, Allan was also a fine fieldsman and an effective lower order batsman with an individual "mud-scrapping style" that others found amusing and "villainously ugly".

In the off-season, Allan played Australian rules football, first for South Melbourne as a successful goalsneak, and later for Albert Park in the fledgling Victorian Football Association. Allan took to many other sports, most notably billiards, shooting, and, after retiring from cricket, bowls. He was also a keen angler, remarking that he "would rather have a day's fishing on good water than play in the biggest of matches", and according to prominent naturalist Donald Macdonald, Allan "knew more about fish and fishing than anyone in Australia". Outside sport, Allan worked in the public service as Victoria's Chief Inspector of Vermin Destruction, and strived to protect Australian fauna and flora.

== Family and early years ==
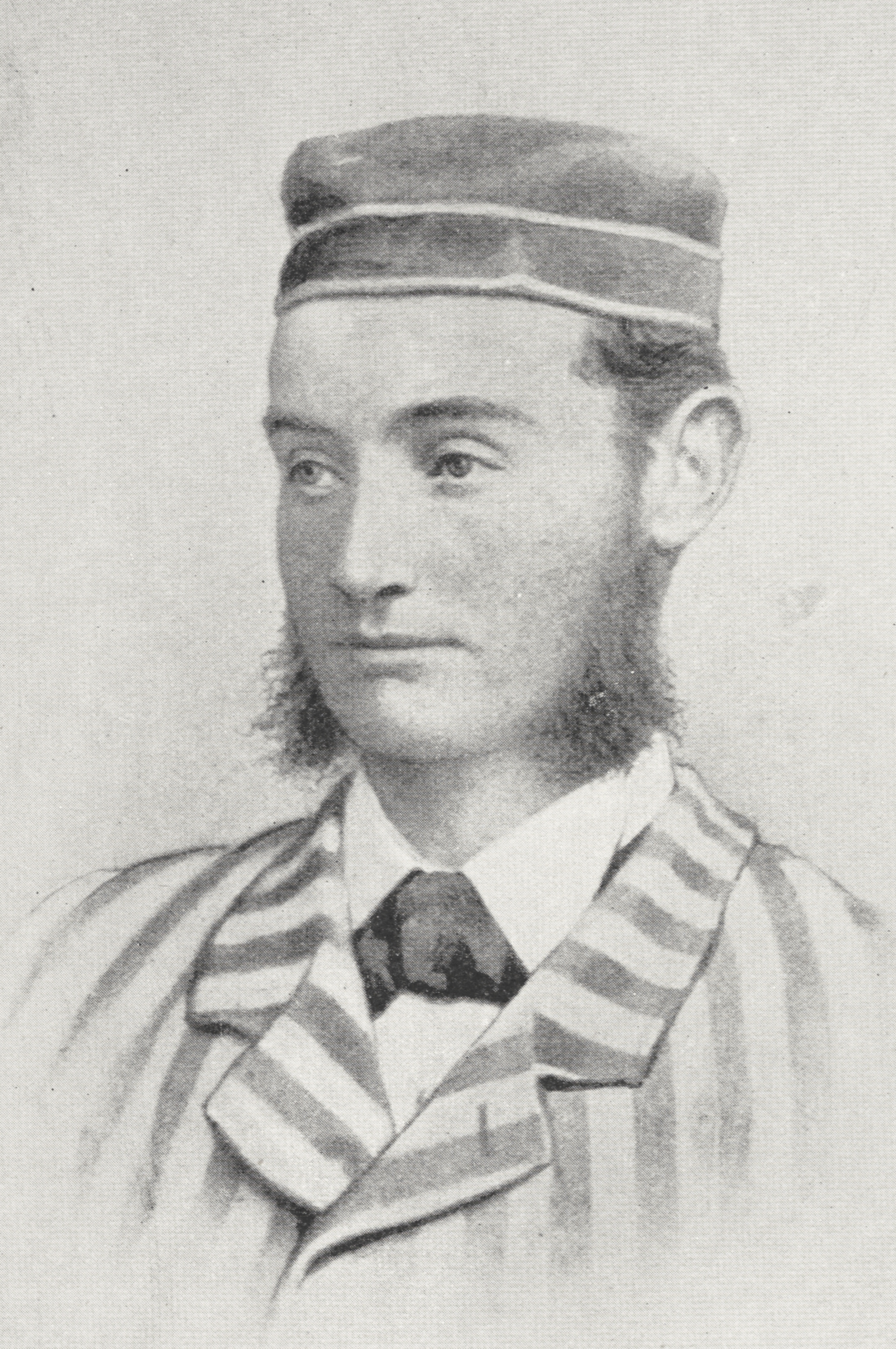
Portrait of cricketer Francis Erskine (Frank) Allan, c. 1870

Allan was born in 1849 at Tooram, a cattle station run by his father John McMahon Allan two miles south of Allansford, near Warrnambool, in the Western District of Victoria, Australia. John was said to have been the first British child born in Heligoland, in 1808, and moved with his parents to Sydney, New South Wales, where his father David Allan, a Scotsman, accepted the post of deputy commissary general during the governorship of Lachlan Macquarie. After spending time at sea aboard a whaler, John overlanded with his brothers Henry and William to the Port Phillip District in the early 1840s to take up pastoral pursuits. Squatting on land east of the Hopkins River in the Western District, John named his property Tooram (most likely derived from an Aboriginal word for "good fishing place"), and in 1843, married Caroline O'Farrell, sister of Henry O'Farrell, a self-proclaimed Fenian who would go on to shoot the Duke of Edinburgh in Australia's first political assassination attempt. John and Caroline had eight children, Frank being the third.

The Allans developed friendly relations with the local Aboriginal people, the Girai wurrung. John became their unofficial protector and served as the honorary correspondent for Warrnambool to the Central Board for the Protection of Aborigines. Frank recalled that the position "entailed a deal of responsibility and hard work—all a labor of love" to his father. The Girai wurrung were Frank's chief companion's growing up; he became fluent in their language, learned their customs, and later attributed his prowess as a bowler in cricket to his formative years spent hunting with boomerangs, nulla nullas and other Aboriginal weapons. Among the Aborigines, his throwing power was regarded as "almost supernatural".

In 1863, during the Victorian gold rush, Frank joined an unsuccessful expedition in search of gold in the Otways. His father, the expedition's leader, reported that Frank and two Aboriginal boys struck gold, "but not in payable quantities".

== Cricket career ==
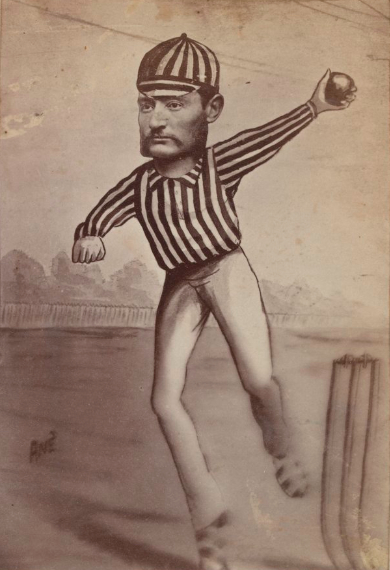
Caricature of Allan, 1877

In February 1869, in his second intercolonial contest, Allan formed a bowling attack with Victorian captain Tom Wills that obliterated the New South Wales batsmen with 8/20 in the first innings and 7/44 in the second innings respectively, securing Victoria's 78-run win. Allan's successes in intercolonial cricket earned him the sobriquet "the bowler of a century".

Allan was probably past his best by the time Test cricket arrived but had a reputation as a superb medium pace bowler (though would probably be more regarded as a spin bowler in modern cricket).

On the Australians tour of 1878 to England, Allan produced some excellent spells of bowling to take over 200 wickets in all games on the tour. However he was troubled by bouts of sickness from the point of arrival in England as he struggled to adjust to the cold weather.

Allan's only Test came against the touring Lord Harris XI in 1879. He had been selected for the first two Tests two years earlier but had declined selection both times, including preferring to attend the Warrnambool Agricultural Fair with friends than playing in the inaugural Test match.

== Australian rules football ==
Allan made his senior football debut in 1867 for South Melbourne, then a leading club of the metropolis, notorious for its brutal and uncompromising style of play. Starting off as a goalsneak, he kicked 4 goals in his first season, the most of any player that year. He recalled in old age the dangers associated with the position: "The name itself made for trouble; ... I verily believe if a goalsneak had been killed in those days it would have been a most difficult matter to find a jury that would have brought in a verdict other than 'justifiable homicide'!" Allan made appearances for other clubs, including Albert Park, which he represented in the opening season of the Victorian Football Association (VFA), and South Yarra. He also served as an administrator for Albert Park and occasionally acted as central umpire when it hosted other teams. Allan played most of his football outside the VFA in Western District competitions for the Warrnambool Football Club. In 1877, he played for Warrnambool against a team of Aborigines, principally from Framlingham Station, kicking the only goal for his side.

Serving as a Carlton Football Club committeeman in later years, he freely admitted to other members that he still barracked for his "original love" of South Melbourne during finals: "I am red and white from head to feet, but blue is not a bad colour."

== Personal life ==
Allan maintained close friendships with Aborigines from the Warrnambool district throughout his life. In 1916, The Camperdown Chronicle published Allan's obituary for Wilmot, "the last of the Tooram tribe of blacks". In it, he recalls "the many happy days" he spent hunting and fishing with Wilmot and other "blackboy mates", and the "wonderful lot of bush lore they taught to an only too willing pupil". Allan closes:

It is sad indeed to write about an extinct tribe. Indeed, I fear it will not be long before the historian of the future will record the end of the last representative of all the Victorian tribes. Long ago Tasmania has made such a record, and Victoria will surely follow suit. The virtues of the dominant race are not for the aborigines; its vices are their destruction. So be it. Let their epitaphs be: 'Killed by civilisation.'

== Death and legacy ==
On 29 January 1917, the day he participated in a bowling tournament at the Melbourne Cricket Ground, Allan "contracted a chill" and was taken to Miss Garlick's Private Hospital in Flinders Lane, where he died on 9 February. His funeral, which was private, took place at Boroondara General Cemetery, Kew.

In its obituary, Wisden wrote that Allan was "the first of the long line of great Australian bowlers", and "the first to develop those special qualities that made Australian bowling ... the talk of the cricket world".

== Bibliography ==
Books

- Clark, Ian D. (1990). Aboriginal Languages and Clans: An Historical Atlas of Western and Central Victoria, 1800–1900. Department of Geography and Environmental Science, Monash University. ISBN 9780909685416.
- Clowes, Colin (2007). 150 Years of NSW First-class Cricket: A Chronology. Allen & Unwin. ISBN 9781741750829.
- de Moore, Greg (2011). Tom Wills: First Wild Man of Australian Sport. Allen & Unwin. ISBN 978-1-74237-598-4.
- Grogan, Robert (2003). Our Proud Heritage: A History of the South Melbourne Cricket Club From 1862. South Melbourne Cricket Club.
- Hedley, Harry W. (1888). At the Wickets: New South Wales versus Victoria. Centennial Printing and Publishing Co.
- Lazenby, John (2015). The Strangers Who Came Home: The First Australian Cricket Tour of England. Bloomsbury Publishing. ISBN 9781408842881.
- McLeod, Barbara; McLeod, Graham (2006). Allansford 1855–2006. Thistle Print. ISBN 9780959271522.
- Pennings, Mark (2012). Origins of Australian Football: Victoria's Early History: Volume 1: Amateur Heroes and the Rise of Clubs, 1858 to 1876. Connor Court Publishing Pty Ltd. ISBN 9781921421471.
- Pennings, Mark (2014). Origins of Australian Football: Victoria's Early History: Volume 2: A Golden Era Begins: Football in 'Marvellous Melbourne', 1877 to 1885. Grumpy Monks Publishing. ISBN 9780646918655.
- Rice, Jonathan; Renshaw, Andrew (2011). The Wisden Collector's Guide. A-C Black. ISBN 9781408165270.
- Williams, Ken (2000). For Club and Country. Melbourne Cricket Club Library. ISBN 9780957807402.
