= Phillpotts =

Phillpotts is a surname. Notable people with the surname include:

- Adelaide Phillpotts (1896–1993), English novelist, poet and playwright
- Ambrosine Phillpotts (1912–1980), British actress
- Bertha Phillpotts (1877–1932), English scholar
- Brian Surtees Phillpotts (1875–1917), officer of the Royal Engineers
- Eden Phillpotts (1862–1960), English author, poet,
- George Phillpotts (1814–1845), New Zealand naval officer
- Henry Phillpotts (1778–1869), Anglican Bishop of Exeter from 1830 to 1869
- James Surtees Phillpotts (1839–1930), author and editor, and headmaster of Bedford School
- John Phillpotts (MP) (1775–1849), nineteenth-century English politician
- Laurent Phillpotts (1922–2016), joined the RAF in 1943
- Louis Murray Phillpotts (1870–1916), senior British Army officer
- William Phillpotts (1807–1888), Archdeacon of Cornwall

== See also ==
- Phillpott (disambiguation)
- Philpott (disambiguation)
- Philpot (disambiguation)
- Philpots
