= Philpott =

Philpott or Philpotts may refer to:

== People ==
- A. B. Philpott (1858–1916), American politician
- A. L. Philpott (1919–1991), American politician
- A. R. Philpott (died 1978), puppeteer
- Alan Philpott (1942–2009), English footballer
- Albert Philpott (1873–1950), Australian cricketer
- Alfred Philpott (1870–1930), New Zealand milk factory worker, museum curator, entomologist and writer
- Andrew Philpott (born 1990), Australian field hockey player
- Dana Philpott, professor of immunology
- Carl Philpott (born 1975), British olfactologist and rhinologist
- Corinne Philpott (1954–2016), Northern Irish judge
- Dave Philpotts (born 1954), football defender from England
- Dean Philpott (born 1935), American football player
- Delbert Philpott (1923–2005), American soldier and scientist
- Ed Philpott (born 1945), American football linebacker
- Elliot Page (born Philpotts-Page; 1987), Canadian actor
- Elmore Philpott (1896–1964), Canadian politician and journalist
- Eric Philpott (1946–2015), Irish Gaelic footballer
- Ernest Philpott (1864–1935)
- Harry M. Philpott (1917–2008), president of Auburn University
- Harvey Cloyd Philpott (1909–1961), American politician
- Henry Philpott (cricketer) (1829–1880), English cricketer
- Jane Philpott (born 1960), Canadian physician and politician
- Kent Philpott, American Baptist pastor, writer, and conversion therapy advocate
- Lachlan Philpott (born 1972), Australian theatre writer, director, and teacher
- Lee Philpott (born 1970), English footballer
- Madge Bellamy (birth name Margaret Derden Philpott; 1899–1990), American movie actress
- Mick Philpott (born 1956), English criminal convicted for multiple manslaughter
- Nicholas Philpott (1690s–1732)
- Paddy Philpott (1936–2016), Irish hurler
- Peter Philpott (1934–2021), Australian cricketer
- Peter Wiley Philpott (1865-1957), Canadian Christian fundamentalist and evangelist
- Richard Philpott (1813–1888)
- Shayne Philpott (born 1965), New Zealand rugby union player
- Stacy Philpott, American ecologist
- Toby Philpott (born 1946), English puppeteer, son of A. R. Philpott
- Tom Philpott (1942–1991), American history professor and researcher of child prostitution
- Violet Philpott (1922–2012), English puppeteer and author
- Wade Edward Philpott (1918–1985), American mathematician and puzzle maker
- William Philpott (1819–1891), Australian cricketer

== Places ==
- Philpott, Queensland, a locality in the North Burnett Region, Queensland, Australia
- Philpott, Virginia, an unincorporated community
- Philpott Dam, a dam in the United States
- Philpott Lake, the reservoir created by Philpott Dam

== See also ==
- Phillpott, surname
- Phillpotts, surname
- Philpot (disambiguation)
- Philpots Island
