= Philpot =

Philpot may refer to:

== Places ==
- Philpot, Kentucky
- Philpot Lane, a short street in London

== People ==
- Andy Philpot, American actor and voice actor
- Asta Philpot (born 1982), protagonist of documentary film For one night only
- Benjamin Philpot (1790–1889), Archdeacon of Man
- Cory Philpot (born 1970), running back
- Elizabeth Philpot (1780–1857)
- Glyn Philpot (1884–1937), English painter and sculptor
- Jamie Philpot (born 1996), English footballer
- John Philpot (1516–1555), Archdeacon of Winchester and martyr
- Lawrence Philpot, American DJ
- Morgan Philpot (born 1971), politician
- Oliver Philpot (1913–1993), Canadian-born Royal Air Force pilot and businessman
- Robin Philpot (born 1948), Quebec journalist and electoral candidate
- Rufus Philpot (born 1968), British musician, former bassist of American progressive metal band Planet X
- Timothy N. Philpot (born 1951), American lawyer, author, and judge

== See also ==
- Phillpott (disambiguation)
- Phillpotts, surname
- Philpott (disambiguation)
- Philpots Island
