= Isaac Henry Gosset =

Consultant paediatrician

Isaac Henry "Harry" Gosset
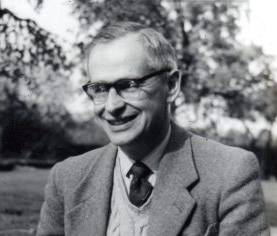
- Dr. Harry Gosset
- Born: 19 May 1907; Oxford
- Died: 4 March 1965 (aged 57); Kettering

Isaac Henry Gosset FRSM FRCP (1907–1965) was a British consultant paediatrician.

== Early life ==
Harry Gosset was the son of statistician William Sealy Gosset and sportswoman Marjory Gosset, née Phillpotts. His paternal grandfather Frederic Gosset, a colonel in the Royal Engineers, was of Huguenot stock. His maternal grandfather James Surtees Phillpotts was headmaster of Bedford School. Though born in Oxford, Harry Gosset spent most of his childhood in Ireland, where his father was statistician to the Guinness Brewery. He was educated at the Dragon School in Oxford and at Rugby School where he had won an entry exhibition to read classics. He then went on to study natural sciences at Magdalen College, Oxford University, graduating BA in 1929. He completed his medical formation at St Thomas' Hospital, London, in 1933.

== Professional career ==
For the next fifteen months after qualifying Gosset occupied a sequence of different posts at St Thomas' Hospital. Subsequently, he became the first ever Casualty Officer at Hammersmith Hospital, then Senior House Physician at the Radcliffe Infirmary in Oxford, where he had charge of many of the child inpatients. After a break spent travelling the world Gosset returned to St Thomas' Hospital for postgraduate study, qualifying as a Member of the Royal College of Physicians in 1936. He joined a general practice in Liphook, Hampshire run by his uncle Dr A C V Gosset for a period before returning to hospital work, first as Assistant Tuberculosis Officer at the London Chest Hospital, then (in 1939) as Assistant Medical Officer in charge of child inpatients at West Middlesex Hospital. From 1940 to 1946 Gosset served as an RAF doctor, rising to the rank of wing commander. After demobilization he worked as Registrar at the Hospital for Sick Children and as Paediatric Registrar at West Middlesex Hospital. In October 1947 he was appointed to be the first consultant paediatrician for Northampton General Hospital; he remained in this post until his death. In the same year, 1947, he was elected a Fellow of the Royal Society of Medicine.

Gosset was noted for pioneering exchange transfusions for neonates, for inventing a simple diagnostic device called the Gosset Icterometer, and for masterminding the establishment of a new Unit for Premature Babies at Northampton General, which was named the Gosset Ward in his memory.

== Death ==
At the age of 57, while alone and driving his car, Gosset suffered a heart attack. He was able to pull in to the side of the road and stop the car before collapsing. He was taken to Kettering Hospital where he was pronounced dead.

An obituary notice described Gosset as follows:

The most modest and patient of men, he was completely dedicated to paediatrics. His knowledge was profound and it was a delight to see him handle a sick child. He wrote little but was a gifted teacher, and his Saturday morning rounds were attended by GPs and MOHs from town and country.
