= Henry Phillpotts =

English Anglican bishop (1778–1869)

The Right Reverend Henry Phillpotts
- Bishop of Exeter
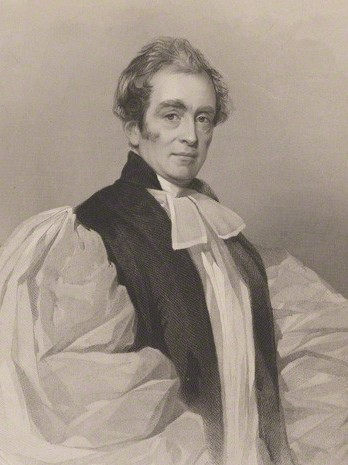
- Diocese: Diocese of Exeter
- In office: 1830–1869
- Predecessor: Christopher Bethell
- Successor: Frederick Temple

Personal details
- Born: 6 May 1778 Bridgwater, Somerset
- Died: 18 September 1869 (aged 91) Torquay, Devon
- Buried: St Marychurch, Devon
- Denomination: Anglican
- Spouse: Deborah Maria Surtees (m.1804)
- Children: William Phillpotts; George Phillpotts
- Education: King's School, Gloucester
- Alma mater: Corpus Christi College, Oxford

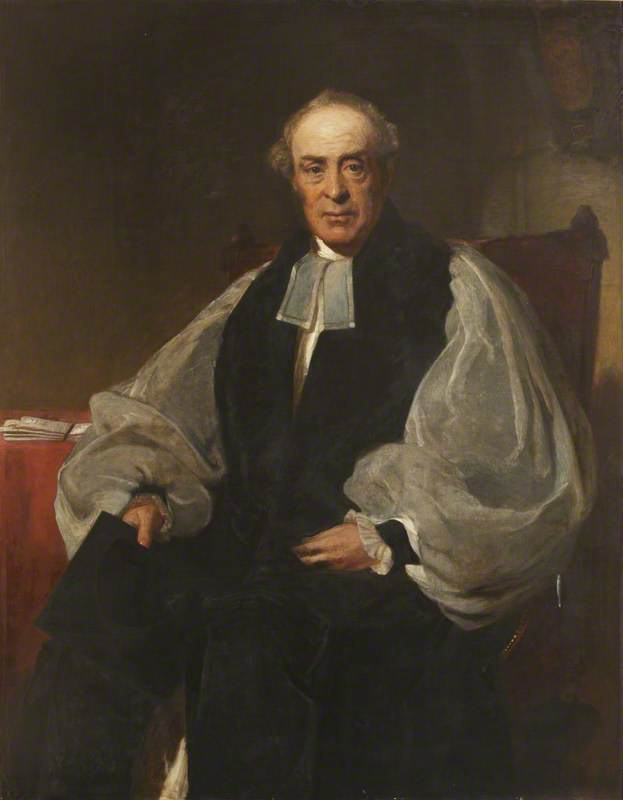
Henry Phillpotts, by John Prescott Knight.

Henry Phillpotts (6 May 1778 – 18 September 1869), often called "Henry of Exeter", was the Anglican Bishop of Exeter from 1830 to 1869. He was one of England's longest serving bishops since the 14th century.

== Life ==
=== Early life ===
Henry Phillpotts, D.D., Bishop of Exeter, was born on 6 May 1778 at Bridgwater, Somerset, England, the son of John Phillpotts, a factory owner, innkeeper, auctioneer and land agent to the Dean and Chapter of Gloucester Cathedral. He grew up in Gloucestershire, and was educated at Gloucester Cathedral school. John Phillpotts, Member of Parliament (MP) for Gloucester city between 1830 and 1847, was his elder brother. Two other brothers, Thomas and George, and two sisters, Isabella and Sibella, reached adulthood; a number of other siblings died in infancy or childhood.

Elected a scholar of Corpus Christi, Oxford, at the age of only thirteen, he took his BA at Corpus Christi, and his MA at Magdalen College in 1795, aged eighteen. He took holy orders in 1802, being ordained deacon by John Randolph, Bishop of London, and priest by Henry Majendie, Bishop of Chester, in 1804.

He was selected university preacher in 1804, in which year he published his Sermon on 5 November, delivered before the University of Oxford.

In September 1804 he was presented to the Crown living of Kilmersdon, near Bath, which he held until 1806. He does not appear ever to have resided there, duty being taken by a curate named Daniel Drape, according to the parish registers.

=== Diocese of Durham ===
Philpotts married in October 1804 and in 1805 became vicar. He was appointed chaplain to Bishop Middleham, County Durham, in the succeeding year. For twenty years he was chaplain to Bishop Shute Barrington, in the Diocese of Durham.

In 1808 he received his next preferment, being collated by the bishop to the large and important parish of Gateshead—within a year his rapid advancement continued with the collation to the ninth prebendal stall in Durham Cathedral.

"That at the age of 31 he should already have held four livings and a prebendal stall testifies to the regard in which he was held by his diocesan, and the usefulness of his marriage connection."

He now resided for a considerable part of the year at Durham, and on the chapelry of St Margaret in the city becoming vacant, he was presented to it by the Dean and Chapter on 28 September 1810. On 30 December 1815 Philpotts received yet further preferment, being collated by the bishop to the second canonry in the Cathedral, the emoluments of which were considerably higher than those of the ninth. This he held for five years, at the end of which period his literary and controversial abilities brought him into advancing prominence.

After holding the rich living of Stanhope, Durham, from 1820, and the Deanery of Chester from 1828, he was consecrated Bishop of Exeter in 1831, holding with the see a residentiary canonry at Durham which he secured permission to hold along with his bishopric, one of the last cases of the benefice in commendam by which medieval and later bishops had often profited.

Philpotts recognised the need to look after his family, extensive as it was — he had 18 children. When he was offered the bishopric in Exeter he realised that the stipend (£3,000) was not enough to support his family, so he asked to retain his parish of Stanhope, in Durham (as a non-resident), which would be worth an additional £4,000 a year. As a compromise he was instead offered the canonry at Durham which was worth a similar amount, and was a post which he continued to hold until his death.

=== Diocese of Exeter ===
As bishop he was a strict disciplinarian, and did much to restore order in a diocese whose clergy had become extraordinarily demoralized and over which he wielded considerable power.

The diocese at that time extended from the Somerset and Dorset borders to the Isles of Scilly in Cornwall. His episcopate was characterized by the establishment of many new parishes in Cornwall and considerable evangelical efforts.

In 1841 he built for himself a palace at Torquay, Devon. Bishopstowe (now the Palace Hotel) served as the bishop's residence, which he preferred as a home to the Bishop's Residence attached to Exeter Cathedral. The gardens in the 25 acres (100,000 m^{2}) of private land stretching to the sea are still a major attraction today together with the Bishop's Walk at the local beauty spot of Ansteys Cove.

Phillpotts was aware that his appointment to Exeter was not popular locally and knowing of his unpopularity he at times took measures to protect himself from it. He admits in a letter to Ralph Barnes, his secretary, on 14 December 1830 to being "Cautious...in admitting adverse newspapers to my table, yet the caution has not prevented me from hearing of the extreme unpopularity of my appointment to Exeter."

The year 1831 saw Phillpotts as the victim of the Guy Fawkes Night custom of burning effigies of clergymen; knowing his reputation he took action by requesting protection, thus the 7th Yeomanry Cavalry filled the palace at Exeter, while the crowd in the cathedral yard burned Phillpotts in effigy;

.... hollow turnip as head and candle as nose, clad in mitre and lawn sleeves... (Chadwick I, 1997, p 29)

In 1848 he placed an appeal in The Guardian of 5 January 1848, for help for the poor of Devonport; his request was answered by Lydia Sellon who was just about to travel to Italy for her health. Philpott's inspiration of Sellon led to the formation of an Anglican order which Sellon led.

== Character ==
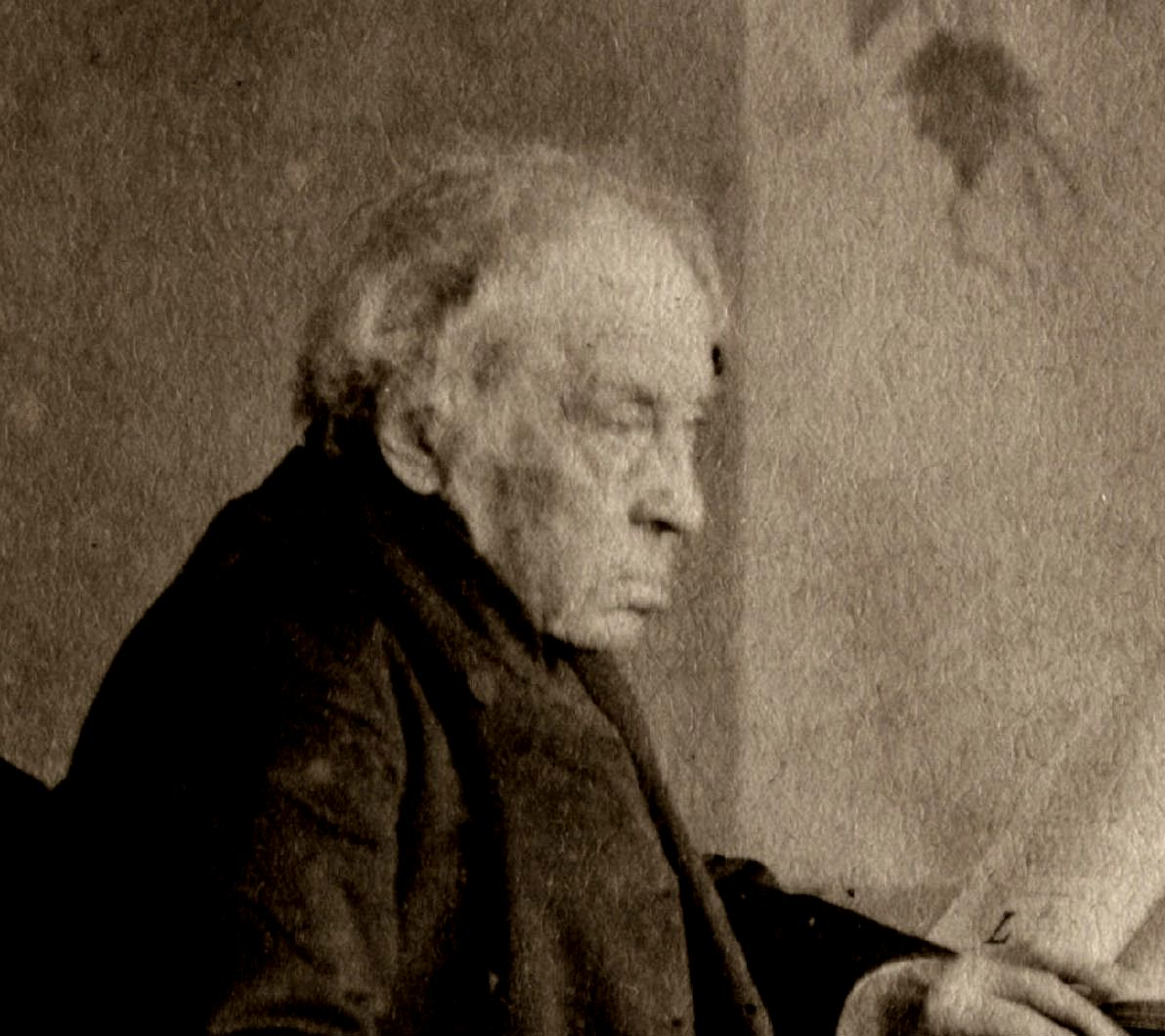
Phillpotts in old age

Phillpotts' character was of the type that determined never to give up on a fight and he persisted in applying his standards. There were many ways that unscrupulous clergy could abuse the Episcopal patronage system, but:

so long as Henry Phillpotts was Bishop of Exeter they avoided the Diocese of Exeter, for they knew that this doughty fighter would fight them to the end if he smelt something improper, whatever the cost to his pocket, however unfavourable the publicity and whatever the inadequacy of his own legal standing. (Chadwick II, 1997, p 212)

He was:

... a genuinely religious man with his religion concealed behind porcupine quills, he constantly quarrelled in the House of Lords, exposing opponents' follies with consummate ability, a tongue and eyes of flame, an ugly tough face and vehement speech.

The bishop's strong views and lack of inhibitions in promoting them at times gained him many enemies in key places:

That devil of a Bishop who inspired more terror than ever Satan did...of whom, however, it must be said that he is a gentleman. (Lord Melbourne, as quoted in Newton, 1968, p173)

Phillpotts at times became unpopular with former friends; one such was Rev. Sydney Smith, a former Tory ally who went on to say:

I must believe in the Apostolic Succession, there being no other way of accounting for the descent of the Bishop of Exeter from Judas Iscariot. (Lambert, 1939, 39)

The text concerning the woman who anointed the head of Jesus with a 'very precious' ointment was chosen by the Bishop for his sermon at the consecration on 24 August 1837 of The New Cemetery in Exeter. The occasion was reported enthusiastically in the local newspaper The Flying Post (31 August 1837):

In its language this sermon was most elegant‚ its delivery was a masterpiece of eloquence, and it was one of the most instructive and enlightened discourses that has been heard.

In the foreword to Davies' biography of Phillpotts, Prof. Norman Sykes summarises the character of the Bishop:

Henry of Exeter, like Job’s war-horse, snuffed the battle from afar; and scented, moreover, a remarkable number and variety of contests in which to engage, without exhausting his capacity for polemic. Like William Warburton of an earlier age (though perhaps he would not have relished the comparison) he was a born fighter. It was his fortune furthermore to live in an age when occasions of dispute were legion; and he threw himself with avidity into their several aspects. Born into the era of the unreformed Parliament and Church, he opposed Catholic Emancipation and parliamentary reform; and was a pluralist who wished to retain in commendam the golden rectory of Stanhope with the See of Exeter, and only compromised by the exchange of living for a rich prebendal stall of Durham, Yet he lived to adjust himself to revolutionary changes in both Church and State. In ecclesiastical matters he was a champion of the principles of the Tractarian revival (a position not to his mind in the leastwise incompatible with mordant criticism of details and individuals); he encouraged the wearing of the surplice, and was a pioneer in the restoration of diocesan synods, and became involved in controversy concerning religious sisterhoods in the Church of England. He was the protagonist in the famous Gorham controversy, and held his ground in defeat when Manning seceded to Rome in protest against the verdict of the Judicial Committee of the Privy Council in Gorham's favour. As a diocesan bishop he was outstanding in administration and pastoral oversight; and his episcopate left its enduring mark on the Diocese of Exeter.

Davies himself explains:

No biographer of Phillpotts could, I think, complete his task with a feeling of real affection for the subject of his study. His character and gifts must command respect, if not approval; but he exhibited a curious lack of balance, and a failure to appreciate and adapt himself to the mood of the times which must detract from a firm claim to greatness on behalf of one so impervious to the changes in contemporary thought and opinion. He deserves, however, to be commemorated as an outstanding figure in the Anglican Church of the nineteenth century, and in particular for his High Church sympathies before the days of the Oxford Movement, at the same time noting that he could never quite come to terms with the Tractarians; and also for his many innovations in diocesan administration, for example, his opposition to non-residence, his advocacy of theological colleges, and his courage in convening a diocesan synod – perhaps the most important event of his career. This study is therefore both an attempt to do justice to his virtues in fearlessly contending for his convictions, while at the same time not disguising those failings which were such a conspicuous feature of his character.

== Politics ==
Phillpotts was an energetic supporter of the Tory party, even when it acted contrary to his views in passing the Roman Catholic Relief Act 1829. In the House of Lords, Phillpotts opposed the 1832 Reform Bill and most other Whig reforms. He was a high-church reformer in his own diocese, aiming to increase the prestige, efficiency and orthodoxy of the church organisation. He was well known for using litigation to achieve his aims and was an earnest administrator, for example, fighting hard to raise the minimum salary for curates in his Diocese to £50, seeking to increase the rights of the poor under the Poor Laws and to ease the plight of children employed in coal-mines and as chimney-sweeps.

== Restoration of Convocation ==
One of Phillpotts' greatest political battles was over the restoration of Convocation, which has developed into the General Synod (as it is now called). He was convinced that the Church needed to establish its rulings in a legislative body, and in a communication in May 1843 to his friend, the Rt Hon J.W. Croker, he explained:

I wish it to sit again, only for the purpose of synodically devising a better synod than itself; one, more like the synods of the early church – in one house, with less of power to the Presbyters – but more means of counsel and aid from them to the Bishops than their separate house gives. I need not tell you that Convocation is not the ancient Synod of our own Church. We need, – and must have – a legislative body, sitting for real business from time to time. It ought to consist of bishops either solely (in the presence of Presbyters who should have a right, not to debate with them, but, hearing what they discuss, to represent by writing their opinions, when they think it necessary) or of bishops and such divines and representatives of the clergy, as shall be found necessary, securing a real preponderance to the bishops.... I am confident that it is hardly possible for us to go on long without restoring to the Church a real Church legislation.... There is not perhaps enough needing amendment in the Rubrics, of itself, to require a Synod. But of the Canons this cannot be said.... They must be altered if the Church is to last in England, under the pressure of all that is opposed to it in privileges (supposed or real) of Dissenters – and with the little of real power of restraint over its own members, even its clergy, which it at present has.

== Publications ==
Phillpotts was renowned for his political pamphlets and the fact that he aired his opinions on every matter of current affairs, although he was not the greatest of diplomats:

The House of Lords expected a humane and courtly manner of bishops and was horrified at the fury of his tone, at the incongruity between his violence and his lawn sleeves. (Chadwick I, 1997, 217)

His published works include numerous speeches and pamphlets, including those connected with his well-known Roman Catholic controversy with Charles Butler (1750–1832) and with the Gorham case, in which he was a principal player. He was a prolific writer of articles on matters of politics, social order and religion, propounding conservative and often controversial views. He was regarded as an opponent of Catholic emancipation, and on this theme published Letters to Charles Butler (1825), Letters to Canning (1827) and A Letter to an English Layman on the Coronation Oath (1828). However, he eventually approved of Peel's scheme for granting relief to Catholics in 1829.

== Legacy ==
Phillpotts' position was that of the traditional High Churchman, with little sympathy either with the evangelicals or with the Tractarians, although he was considered to represent the conservative high church wing of the Oxford Movement and emphasized liturgical forms of worship, episcopal government, monastic life, and early Christian doctrine as normative of orthodoxy.

On the one hand, the famous Gorham judgment was the outcome of his refusal to give the living of Brampford Speke to George Cornelius Gorham (1787–1857), who had expressed disbelief in baptismal regeneration; on the other hand, he denounced the equally famous Tract 90 in his episcopal charge of 1843.

Phillpotts was generous in his gifts to the church, founding the theological college at Exeter and spending large sums on the restoration of the cathedral. Exeter Cathedral states that Phillpotts was able to restore the Bishop's palace in a "most creditable manner".

An allegation, made at the General Synod in 2006 claimed that Phillpotts was paid almost £13,000 (£12,729.5s.2d) in 1833, under the terms of the Slavery Abolition Act 1833, as compensation for the loss of slaves when they were emancipated. The same claim was repeated in the House of Commons by Chris Bryant, MP for Rhondda: However, it has been shown that the Compensation of £13089.4s.4d was paid to Phillpotts and three others acting as trustees and executors for John Ward, 1st Earl of Dudley for 665 slaves on three plantations in Jamaica. It was considered unlikely that any share of such funds, equivalent to more than one million pounds sterling in present value, went to Phillpotts as he would not have been permitted to be paid for acting as Executor nor to benefit under the terms of the Will. Further investigation into the will of Lord Dudley has shown that Phillpotts was given an item of £2000 in a codicil letter attached to the will dated September 21, 1831. Given that the executors did benefit financially from the will it cannot be said with certainty that the executors did not benefit financially from the ‘slave compensation’ payment, especially because the will was contested in the courts and the slave compensation was under consideration in those proceedings. https://drive.google.com/file/d/1Eb9Ui6LGsHtwievPqHScJw95v71gQRfP/view

Other large amounts bequeathed to the executors in the codicil letter include: “item, to John Benbow Esq. of Lincolns Inn, five thousand pounds. Item, to Francis Downing Esq, of Dudley four thousand pounds. (as well as) Item to Henry Lord Bishop of Exeter two thousand pounds”

Both the office of the then Bishop of Exeter, Michael Langrish, at the time of the allegation, and the Devon County Library (which holds Diocesan records), have stated that they hold no record of any further involvement in the slave trade by Phillpotts other than the recording as a Trustee/Executor of a joint holding of the 665 slaves that were the property of John Ward, 1st Earl of Dudley. Although Bishop Phillpotts did not own slaves, the allegation remains, that he was party to the forgery of the will of Lord Dudley. The will of Lord Dudley is held in The National Archives, PROB 10/5417 this document includes the codicil letters and letters pertaining to the authenticity of the will written by Jon Benbow (Solicitor to Lord Dudley), and Henry Money Wainwright, Clerk to Jon Benbows solicitors and scribe of the will.

His biographer sums up his legacy thus:

The champion of lost causes, his attitude, his policy, and even his virtues became increasingly inappropriate. Loyal and even tender in family relationships; staunch in friendships; violent in controversy; brilliant in debate, he certainly deserves to be commemorated as one of the outstanding figures on the Bench during the nineteenth century.

The church tower at St. Marychurch was restored in 1873, at a cost of £3,500, in the bishop's memory.

The Bishop Phillpotts Library in Truro, Cornwall, founded by the bishop in 1856 for the benefit of the clergy of Cornwall, held more than 10,000 volumes, mainly theological, and was open to access by clergy and students of all denominations. It was opened in 1871 and almost doubled in size in 1872 by the bequest of the collection of Prebendary Ford. The historic books were however sold off by the Diocese in 2006, for considerably less than their market value.

== Marriage ==
In October 1804, not long after his ordination as a priest, Henry Phillpotts married Deborah Maria Surtees (1782–1863). She was a niece of John Scott, 1st Earl of Eldon: thus the marriage marked a rise in social status for the young clergyman whose own family background was undistinguished.

== Family ==
Henry Phillpotts and his wife Deborah had a total of eighteen children. Of these the eldest son was William Phillpotts (1807–1888), Archdeacon of Cornwall and vicar of St Gluvias. William Phillpotts' sons included James Surtees Phillpotts, Headmaster of Bedford School, and his grandsons included Brigadier General Louis Murray Phillpotts and Lieutenant Colonel Brian Surtees Phillpotts, both of them heroes of the First World War.

Several of Henry Phillpotts' children married into the families of his diocesan clergy, examples being Maria Phillpotts who in 1833 married the Reverend Richard Stephens, rector of Dunsford, Sybella Phillpotts who in 1836 married the Reverend Francis Houssemayne du Boulay, rector of Lawhitton, and Charles Edward Phillpotts, an Army officer who in 1860 married Jane Hole, daughter of the rector of Chulmleigh.

The West Country writer Eden Phillpotts was a grandson of Henry Phillpotts' younger brother Thomas Phillpotts (1785–1862), a West Indies merchant and plantation owner and subsequently co-owner (with Samuel Baker) of Bakers Quay at Gloucester Quays.

== Death ==
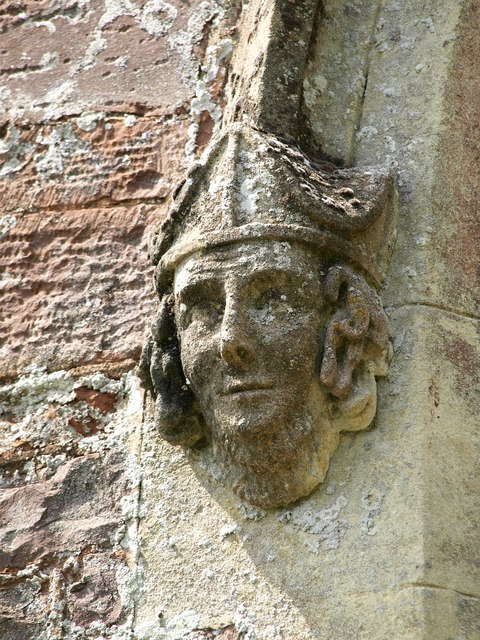
Carved head of a bishop at Chevithorne, possibly that of Henry Phillpotts

On 9 September 1869 Phillpotts formally executed the resignation of his see, but before its completion he died on 18 September 1869. He was buried in the churchyard at St Marychurch, Torquay, near his wife Deborah, who had died six years before him.

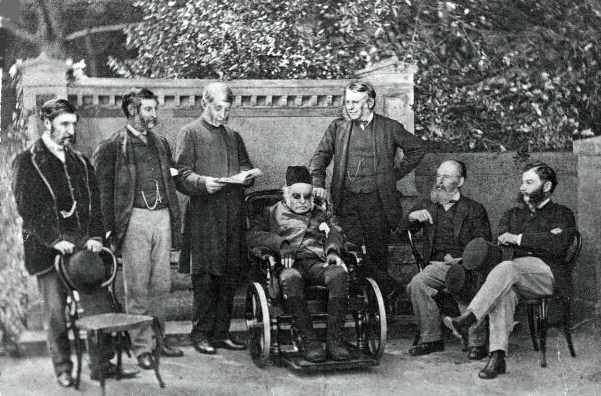
Bishop Phillpotts with six of his sons on the occasion of his 90th birthday, 1868

== Obituary ==
Extract from The Times, 20 September 1869:

Fierce, fiery, and intolerant of opposition to a fault, and sincere and earnest in an age which is not remarkable for earnestness in religion, he held to the last to the via media of the Anglican Church as the strongest safeguard against Romish and Calvinistic errors, and probably rejoiced to die like Ken and Laud and scores of High Church prelates of the Stuart times, expressing his firm faith in the Anglo-Catholic Church as essentially one and the same in doctrine and faith with the undivided Church of the first five centuries of the Christian era. Well, at length he rests from his labours side by side with Archbishop Sumner and Mr Gorham. Let us write on his tomb one simple word, Requiescat.

== In literature ==
In Anthony Trollope's 1855 novel, The Warden, the fictional archdeacon of Barchester Cathedral, Dr. Grantly, keeps in his private study "the busts of the greatest among the great: Chrysostom, St. Augustine, Thomas à Becket, Cardinal Wolsey, Archbishop Laud, and Dr. Philpotts" (chap. XII).

Bishop Phillpotts appears as a pompous bishop of Exeter, in Edward Marston's historical novel set in 1857, The Stationmaster's Farewell. This is no.9 of the Railway Detective series featuring Inspector Colbeck and Sergeant Leeming.

In June 2026 a play titled The Many Ghosts of Bishop Phillpotts is being performed by Exeter Drama Company at Cygnet theatre. The play looks at a fictional meeting between Dr Eric Williams, and Phillpotts. The play explores the circumstances around which Bishop Phillpotts received slave compensation money as a 'Trustee' of former foreign secretary John William Ward, 1st Earl of Dudley

== Works ==
- 1849 "The Case of the Rev. Mr. Shore. A Letter to his Grace the Archbishop of Canterbury Yeovil: H. M. Custard, Hendford

== See also ==
- Constance Kent case

== Sources ==
- Burns, Arthur. ‘Phillpotts, Henry (1778–1869)’, Oxford Dictionary of National Biography (subscription required for online access) (Oxford University Press, 2004). Retrieved 2008-05-02
- Chadwick, Owen. The Victorian Church Parts One and Two: 1829–1856, 1860–1901 (London: SCM Press Ltd, 1997)
- "Phillpotts, Henry (1802–1831)". The Clergy of the Church of England Database 1540–1835. CCEd Person ID 28960.
- Croker, Rt. Hon. John Wilson. Correspondence and Diaries (London: John Murray, 1884) Vol. III, pp 4–6
- Davies, G.C.B. Henry Phillpotts, Bishop of Exeter (London: Society for the Promotion of Christian Knowledge, 1954)
- Lambert, R.S. The Cobbett of the West (London: Nicholson & Watson Limited, 1939)
- Newton, R. Victorian Exeter 1837–1914 (Leicester: Leicester University Press, 1968)

Church of England titles
| Preceded by Christopher Bethell | Bishop of Exeter; 1830–1869 | Succeeded by Frederick Temple |
