= Hamnet Share =

British naval officer

Paymaster Rear-Admiral Sir Hamnet Holditch Share, KBE, CB, CVO (19 May 1864 – 26 June 1937) was a Royal Navy paymaster officer. He is most notable for his long service as the secretary of Admiral Sir John Jellicoe before and during the First World War.

== Biography ==
=== Early life and naval career ===
Born in Penryn, Share entered the Royal Navy in 1880 as an assistant clerk. His first ship was HMS Tourmaline, in which he participated in the Anglo-Egyptian War of 1882 and was present during the First Madagascar expedition. In 1885, Share was appointed to the Sheerness Naval Depot, and in 1886 he was appointed secretary on the staff of Vice-Admiral Sir William Hewett, Vice-Admiral Commanding, Channel Squadron. From 1888 he held a similar appointment on the staff of the Commander-in-Chief, Cape of Good Hope Station and West Africa Station.

From 1892 to 1899, he was accounting officer in the royal yacht HMY Victoria and Albert, being promoted to paymaster during that time. He was then appointed secretary to Rear-Admiral Lewis Beaumont, on the Pacific and Australian stations. In 1903, he was lent to the Colonial Office to serve as secretary to Admiral Sir Harry Rawson, Governor of New South Wales; the following year, he was appointed secretary to Lord Northcote, Governor-General of Australia, serving until 1908. Returning to naval service, he was promoted to fleet paymaster and appointed to the torpedo school ship HMS Vernon.

=== Service with Jellicoe ===
In December 1910, he was selected to become secretary to Vice-Admiral Sir John Jellicoe, Commander-in-Chief, Atlantic Fleet, the beginning of their long association. Share followed Jellicoe to the Home Fleet in 1911 and to the Admiralty in 1912, when Jellicoe was appointed Second Sea Lord. On the outbreak of the First World War, Share followed Jellicoe to the Grand Fleet, and was present at the Battle of Jutland in 1916. On Jellicoe's appointment as First Sea Lord in November 1916, Share was appointed Additional Naval Assistant to the First Sea Lord. That year, he was appointed a CB. In January 1917, he was promoted to paymaster-in-chief, the highest paymaster grade, and in October that year he was appointed Naval Assistant to the First Sea Lord.

In 1919–1920, Share accompanied Jellicoe during his tour of India and the dominions on HMS New Zealand, being appointed a KBE at the cruise's conclusion. He retired with the rank of paymaster rear-admiral in 1921.

=== Royal service and later life ===
From 1922 to 1934, Share was Gentleman Usher in Ordinary to the King; on reaching the age limit for gentleman ushers in 1934 he was appointed an Extra Gentleman Usher and a CVO. In 1932, he published his memoirs. He died at Truro in 1937, "from shock following an operation."
