= John Bull (priest) =

John Bull was Archdeacon of Cornwall, then Barnstaple in the first half of the nineteenth century.

Church of England titles
Preceded by William Short	Archdeacon of Cornwall; February 1826–June 1826	Succeeded by John Sheepshanks
Preceded by Thomas Johns	Archdeacon of Barnstaple; 1826–1830	Succeeded by George Barnes
