= Naval Assistant to the First Sea Lord =

- Active: 1905-2014
- Country: United Kingdom
- Allegiance: British Empire
- Branch: Royal Navy
- Type: Staff officer
- Part of: Office of the First Sea Lord (1905—2014)
- Garrison/HQ: Admiralty, Ministry of Defence; Whitehall; London; Great Britain

The Naval Assistant to the First Sea Lord also known as the Executive Assistant to the First Sea Lord was a senior appointment of the Royal Navy established in 1905 until 2014. The post holder was responsible for assisting the First Sea Lord in the discharging of his duties and responsible for administrative and secretarial work within the private office of the First Sea Lord.

== History ==
Prior to 1905, the Sea Lords were without a specific naval officer responsible for secretarial duties within their respective offices, that particular duty was undertaken by random secretaries selected from within the secretarial pool at the Admiralty. The first incumbent was Captain, Charles E. Madden. The post holder was primarily responsible for administrative and secretarial duties within the private office of the First Sea Lord. Occasionally they were referred to as the Executive Assistant to the First Sea Lord. They were occasionally in attendance with 1SL at Navy Board meetings. The final incumbent was Commander, David J.D. Dominy.

Until 2010, the naval assistant usually held the rank of Captain later Commander.

== Naval assistants ==
Included:

1. Captain Charles E. Madden: December 1905-August 1907
2. Captain Archibald G.H.W. Moore: August 1907-December 1908
3. Captain Henry F. Oliver: December 1908-January 1912
4. Captain Charles M. de Bartolome: January 1912-August 1914
5. Captain T. Percy H. Beamish: August–October 1914
6. Captain Thomas E. Crease: October 1914-May 1915
7. Captain A. Dudley P.R. Pound: January–October 1915
8. Captain Allan F. Everett: July 1915-December 1916
9. Captain Edward M. Phillpotts: December 1916-October 1917
10. Captain John P.R. Marriott: April 1918-November 1919
11. Captain Roger M. Bellairs: November 1919-October 1925
12. Captain Sidney R. Bailey: October 1925-November 1927
13. Captain William M. James: November 1927-March 1929
14. Captain Herbert Fitzherbert: March 1929-? 1930
15. Captain Guy Grantham: June 1939-May 1940
16. Captain Cecil C.A.Allen: May 1940-May 1941
17. Captain John W.A. Waller: May 1941-March 1942
18. Captain Francis H.W. Goolden: March 1942-February 1943
19. Captain Geoffrey Thistleton-Smith: February 1943-January 1945
20. Captain George K. Collett: January 1945-February 1946
21. Captain Sir Charles E. Madden, Bt.: February 1946-July 1947
22. Captain Walter A. Adair: July 1947-September 1948
23. Captain Christopher T. Jellicoe: September 1948-September 1950
24. Captain Peter W. Gretton: September 1950-May 1952
25. Captain Charles W. Malins: May 1952-April 1954
26. Captain F. Brian P. Brayne-Nicholls: April 1954-December 1955
27. Captain Peter N. Howes: December 1955-December 1957
28. Captain L. Derek Empson: December 1957-August 1959
29. Captain J. Anthony R. Troup: August 1959-August 1961
30. Captain David Williams: August 1961-January 1964
31. Captain David G. Roome: January 1964-March 1966
32. Captain Michael R. Collins: March 1966-April 1968
33. Captain Martin La T. Wemyss: April 1968 – 1970
34. Captain John F. Cadell: 1970-August 1972
35. Captain David G. Armytage: August 1972-July 1974
36. Captain Richard G.A. Fitch: July 1974-May 1976
37. Captain D. Benjamin Bathurst: May 1976-June 1978
38. Captain John F. Coward: June 1978-June 1980
39. Captain George M. Tullis: June 1980-January 1983
40. Captain John F.S. Trinder: January 1983-September 1984
41. Captain Thomas M. Le Marchand: September 1984-August 1986
42. Captain Peter M. Franklyn: August 1986-April 1988
43. Captain William C. McKnight: April–December 1988
44. Captain R. John Lippiett: December 1988 – 1990
45. Captain Michael G. Wood: 1991-1992
46. Captain A. James G. Miller: 1993-1998
47. Captain Ian F. Corder: 1999-2001
48. Captain James A. Morse: 2002-November 2004
49. Captain Jeremy J.F. Blunden: November 2004-November 2006
50. Commander William N. Entwisle: 2007-2008
51. Captain James D. Morley: 2009-2010
52. Commander Iain S. Lower: 2010-2011
53. Commander David J.D. Dominy: September 2012-September 2014

=== Additional Naval Assistants to the First Sea Lord ===
Included:

1. Captain Sydney S. Hall, 31 October 1914 – 8 February 1915
2. Captain Dudley Pound, 20 March 1915 – 24 October 1915
3. Paymaster-in-Chief Hamnet H. Share, 4 December 1916 – October, 1917
4. Commander Ralph F. Seymour, 3 November 1919 – 22 March 1920
