= Phillpott =

Phillpott is a surname. Notable people with the surname include:

- Jane Philpott (born 1960), Canadian politician and physician
- Scott Phillpott, US Naval captain

== See also ==
- Philpott (disambiguation)
- Phillpotts
- Philpot (disambiguation)
