= Marjory Gosset =

Marjory Surtees Gosset
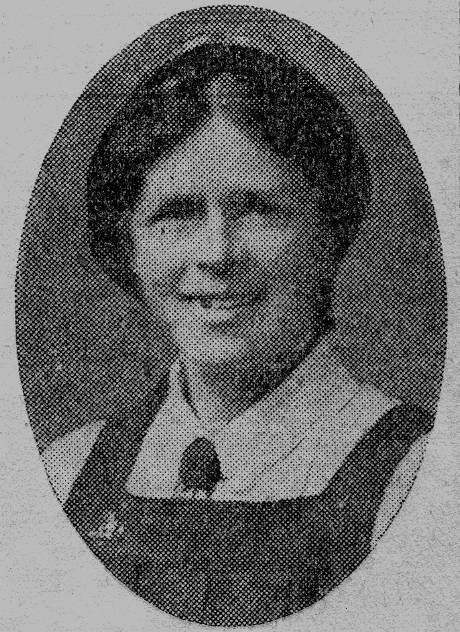
- Marjory Gosset in 1930
- Born: 27 May 1879; Bedford, England
- Died: 12 December 1965 (aged 86); Oxford, England

Marjory Gosset (27 May 1879 – 12 December 1965) was a noted English hockey player in the early years of the 20th century. She captained the national teams of both England and Ireland at different times in her career; she captained Ireland after she married William Sealy Gosset and they had moved to Dublin.

== Birth and education ==
Marjory Surtees Gosset was born in Bedford, England the third daughter and youngest child of James Surtees Phillpotts and Marian Hadfield Phillpotts née Cordery. Her siblings included the Icelandic scholar Bertha Surtees Phillpotts and World War I hero Brian Surtees Phillpotts. She went to Bedford School where her father was headmaster, but was educated at home, to a large extent by her mother.

== Sporting career ==
Marjory Phillpotts (as she then was) started playing hockey at Bedford in 1896. At that time the standard hockey stick had a rounded face rather than a flat one and the ball had a covering of tightly wound string. In 1899 she joined Bedford Hockey Club and began her sporting career. She played for the Midlands from 1899 to 1903 and for England from 1900 to 1903. In 1903 she captained the England team against Ireland.

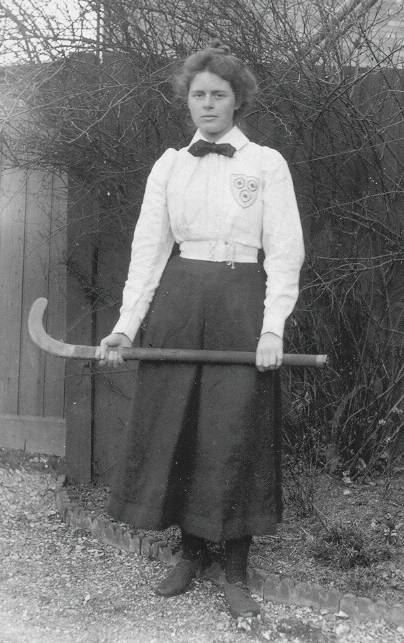
As a hockey player in 1897

There was then a gap in her career following her marriage to the industrial statistician William Sealy Gosset and moved to Dublin where her husband and also her brother Geoffrey were employed at Guinness brewery.

In 1910 Mrs Gosset resumed her hockey career. She was selected for Leinster in that year, and also for Ireland. She played for Ireland in 1910, 1912, 1913 and 1914 and captained the team in the last two of those years. She was in fact unusual, if not unique, in having captained the national teams of both England and Ireland at different times in her career.

After another gap of nine years Mrs Gosset joined the Optimists Hockey Club, for which she played until the early 1930s, by which time she was over fifty years old.

In addition to her playing career Marjory was a selector for the Leinster Hockey Association and Ireland and honorary secretary for the Umpires Association. She also served the Girl Guides movement as a commissioner and in other roles.

== Personal life and death ==
Marjory Gosset had three children. The eldest, Harry Gosset (1907–1965) was a consultant paediatrician; the second, Bertha Marian Gosset (1909–2004) was a geographer and worked for some time as a nurse; the youngest, Ruth Gosset (1911–1953) married the Oxford mathematician Douglas Roaf and had five children, Dermot, Brigid, Rachel, Jane and Michael Roaf.

Marjory Gosset remained vigorous and active until after her mid-eighties, outliving two of her children. She died in Oxford in 1965.
