= John Sheepshanks (priest) =

John Sheepshanks (b. Linton 5 May 1765 – d. St Gluvias 17 December 1844) was a nineteenth century Archdeacon of Cornwall.

Sheepshanks was educated at Trinity College, Cambridge and ordained in 1788. He served curacies in Ovington and Leeds, after which he was the incumbent at St Gluvias until his death.

Church of England titles
Preceded by John Bull	Archdeacon of Cornwall; 1826–1844	Succeeded by William Phillpotts
