= Sidney Bailey =

Royal Navy Admiral (1882–1942)

Admiral Sir Sidney Bailey KBE CB DSO
- Admiral Bailey in 1936
- Born: 27 August 1882; Chelsea, London
- Died: 27 March 1942 (aged 59)
- Military career
- Allegiance: United Kingdom
- Branch: Royal Navy
- Service years: 1896–1942
- Rank: Admiral
- Commands: Royal Naval College, Greenwich (1937–38); Battlecruiser Squadron (1934–36); HMS Renown (1927–1929); 9th Destroyer Flotilla (1923–1925); HMS Mackay (1923–1925)
- Conflicts: Boxer Rebellion; First World War; Second World War
- Awards: Knight Commander of the Order of the British Empire; Companion of the Order of the Bath; Distinguished Service Order; Mentioned in Despatches

Admiral Sir Sidney Robert Bailey, KBE, CB, DSO (27 August 1882 – 27 March 1942) was a Royal Navy officer who served as President of the Royal Naval College, Greenwich from 1937 to 1938.

== Naval career ==
Bailey joined the Royal Navy as a cadet in the training ship HMS Britannia in September 1896. As a midshipman in HMS Centurion, he took part in the Seymour Expedition for the relief of Peking legations in 1900 during the Boxer Rebellion, for which he was mentioned in despatches. He was promoted to acting sub-lieutenant on 27 August 1901 and subsequently confirmed in that rank from the same date. In November 1902 he was posted to the protected cruiser HMS Doris, but was first lent for a couple of weeks to HMS Hogue for sea-trials. He was promoted to lieutenant on 27 February 1903. He qualified as a gunnery lieutenant from 1905 to 1907, and served in the battleship HMS Africa from 1908 to 1910 and in the cruiser HMS Leviathan from 1911 to 1912. Following two periods on the staff of the Whale Island gunnery school at Whale Island, he was promoted to commander in June 1914.

Bailey served as gunnery officer in HMS Erin during the first years of the First World War. In 1916 he was appointed to the staff of Vice Admiral David Beatty and served as a fleet gunnery officer on HMS Lion, having been recommended by Flag-Captain Ernle Chatfield as "one of the best gunnery officers in the Navy". In November 1916 he was appointed Flag Commander to Beatty when the latter was appointed to the command of the Grand Fleet, first in HMS Iron Duke and then the new fleet flagship HMS Queen Elizabeth. Bailey was promoted to captain in December 1918 and was awarded the Distinguished Service Order in 1919. He then worked as deputy director of the Operations Division of the Naval Staff.

Bailey appointed naval attaché in Washington, D.C. in March 1921. In January 1923, he took command of the 9th Destroyer Flotilla of the Atlantic Fleet. In 1925 he was appointed Naval Assistant to the First Sea Lord, who was then Lord Beatty. He then returned to sea when he was given command of HMS Renown. He was appointed a Commander of the Order of the British Empire (CBE) in the 1927 Birthday Honours.

Bailey was promoted to rear admiral in 1931 and, from April 1931 to October 1932, served as Chief of Staff to Admiral Sir Ernle Chatfield, who was at that time Commander-in-Chief Mediterranean Fleet. In February 1933 he became Assistant Chief of the Naval Staff, and in August 1934 Bailey succeeded Rear Admiral William James in command of the Battlecruiser Squadron, flying his flag aboard HMS Hood.

During training exercises off the Spanish coast on 23 January 1935, the Hood and HMS Renown collided. Bailey and the captains of both ships were court-martialed for the incident. It was the first court-martial of an admiral since the First World War. Following acrimonious proceedings, Bailey and the captain of the Hood were both acquitted, while the court found the captain of the Renown guilty. However, the Admiralty subsequently reviewed of the verdicts and declined "to absolve Rear-Admiral Bailey from all blame". In 1936, the Hood needed to be refitted and recommissioned. The Admiralty had planned for Bailey to transfer his flag to the Renown. However, there were continued bad feelings about the collision and courts-martial among the officers of the Renown, and Bailey pleaded successfully to be allowed to remain with the Hood until she returned to Portsmouth.

Bailey was appointed President of the Royal Naval College, Greenwich in 1937. In 1938 he was appointed as a Knight Commander of the Order of the British Empire. He was promoted to admiral on retirement in 1939.

Bailey was recalled to active service after the outbreak of the Second World War. In June 1940, the Admiralty created a secret committee, named the Bailey Committee for its chair, which examined the level of naval assistance to be sought from the United States. The American admiral Robert L. Ghormley was given a copy of the report in August 1940, and Bailey, the committee and Ghormley met regularly through the autumn, and developed important processes for the exchange of information about intelligence, technical and operational matters.

== Personal life ==
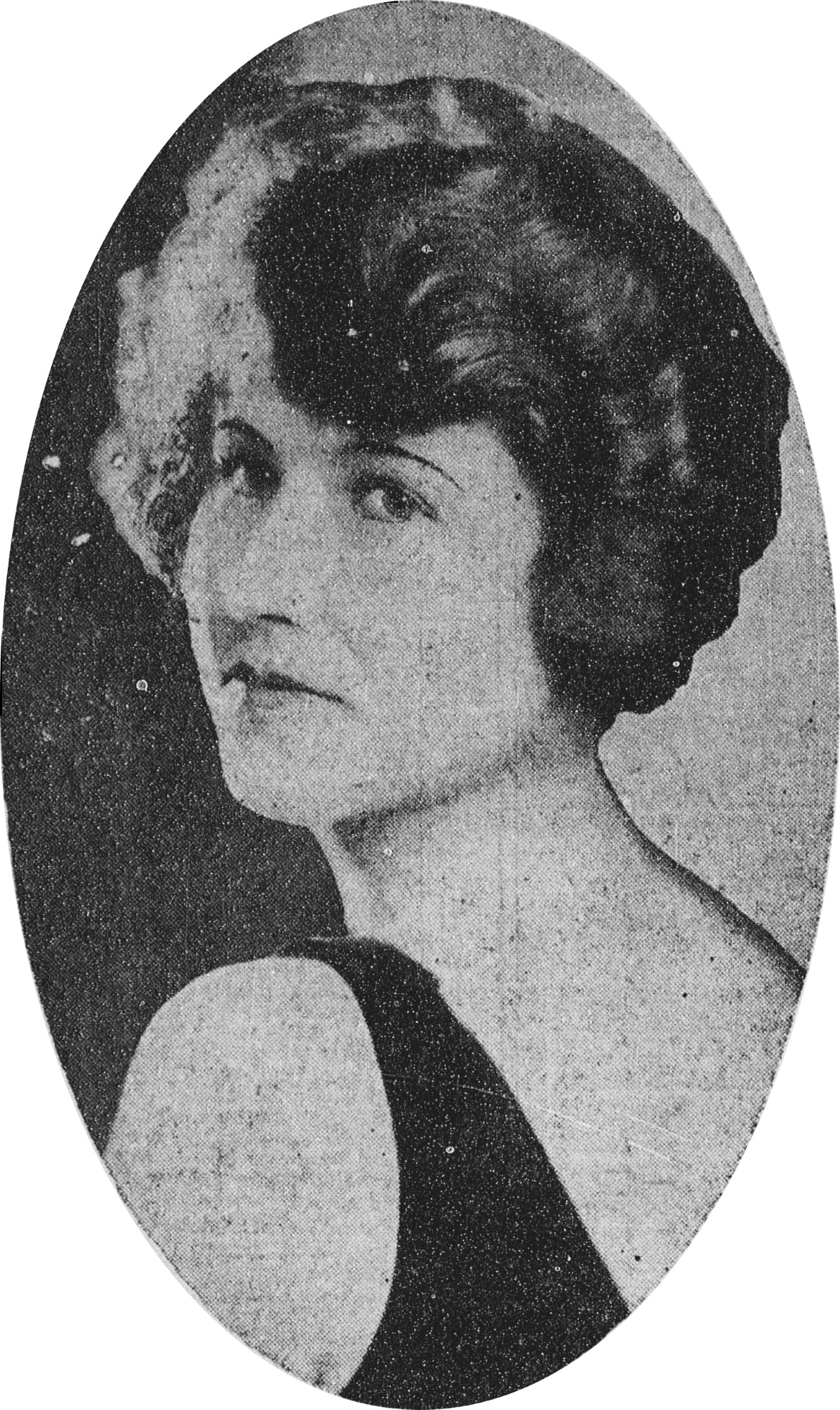
Mildred Bromwell

In 1922, Bailey married Mildred Bromwell; they had a daughter and a son. Bailey died on 27 March 1942 after a short illness and was cremated at Golders Green Crematorium, London.

Military offices
Preceded by Sir William James	Commander, Battlecruiser Squadron; 1934–1936	Succeeded by Sir Geoffrey Blake
Preceded by Sir Ragnar Colvin	President, Royal Naval College, Greenwich; 1937–1938	Succeeded by Sir Charles Kennedy-Purvis
