= Louis Murray Phillpotts =

WWI Senior British Army officer

Brigadier-General Louis Murray Phillpotts CMG DSO
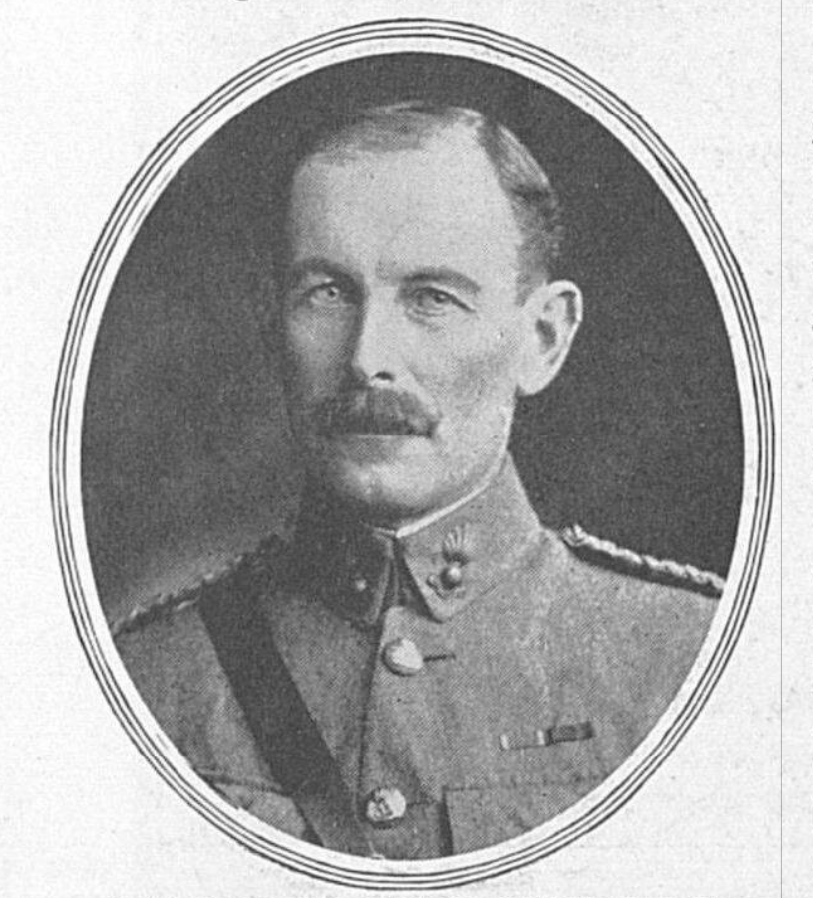
- Born: 3 June 1870; Lamerton, Devon, England
- Died: 8 September 1916 (aged 46); France
- Military career
- Allegiance: United Kingdom
- Branch: British Army
- Service years: 1890 – 1916
- Rank: Brigadier-General
- Units: Royal Artillery, Royal Field Artillery
- Conflicts: Second Boer War, First World War
- Awards: CMG, DSO

Brigadier-General Louis Murray Phillpotts CMG DSO (3 June 1870 – 8 September 1916) was a senior British Army officer during the First World War.

== Early life ==
Louis Murray Phillpotts was born on 3 June 1870 in Lamerton near Tavistock in Devon. His father, the Reverend Henry Phillpotts (1833-1919) (eldest son of Archdeacon William Phillpotts and grandson of Henry Phillpotts, Bishop of Exeter) was at that time vicar of Lamerton. Louis was educated at Bedford School (under the headmastership of his uncle James Surtees Phillpotts) and at the Royal Military Academy, Woolwich.

== British Army ==
Louis Phillpotts received his first commission as a second lieutenant in the Royal Artillery on 14 February 1890, and was promoted to the rank of lieutenant on 14 February 1893. He served during the Second Boer War, between 1899 and 1901, where he fought in the Battle of Modder River (November 1899) and took part in the Relief of Kimberley in February 1900. He was promoted to the rank of captain on 23 January 1900, and served as a divisional adjutant in South Africa in 1901. Promotion to the rank of major followed on 3 July 1907. He served during the First World War, was promoted to the rank of lieutenant colonel in October 1914, and to the rank of brigadier general in 1915.

Phillpotts was invested as a Companion of the Distinguished Service Order in September 1901, and as a Companion of the Order of St Michael and St George in June 1916.

== Family life ==
Philpotts married Amy Anne Charlotte Duckett in 1909 and they had a son in Henry in 1910. Philpotts was killed in action in France on 8 September 1916, aged 46.
