= William Sealy Gosset =

British statistician (1876–1937)

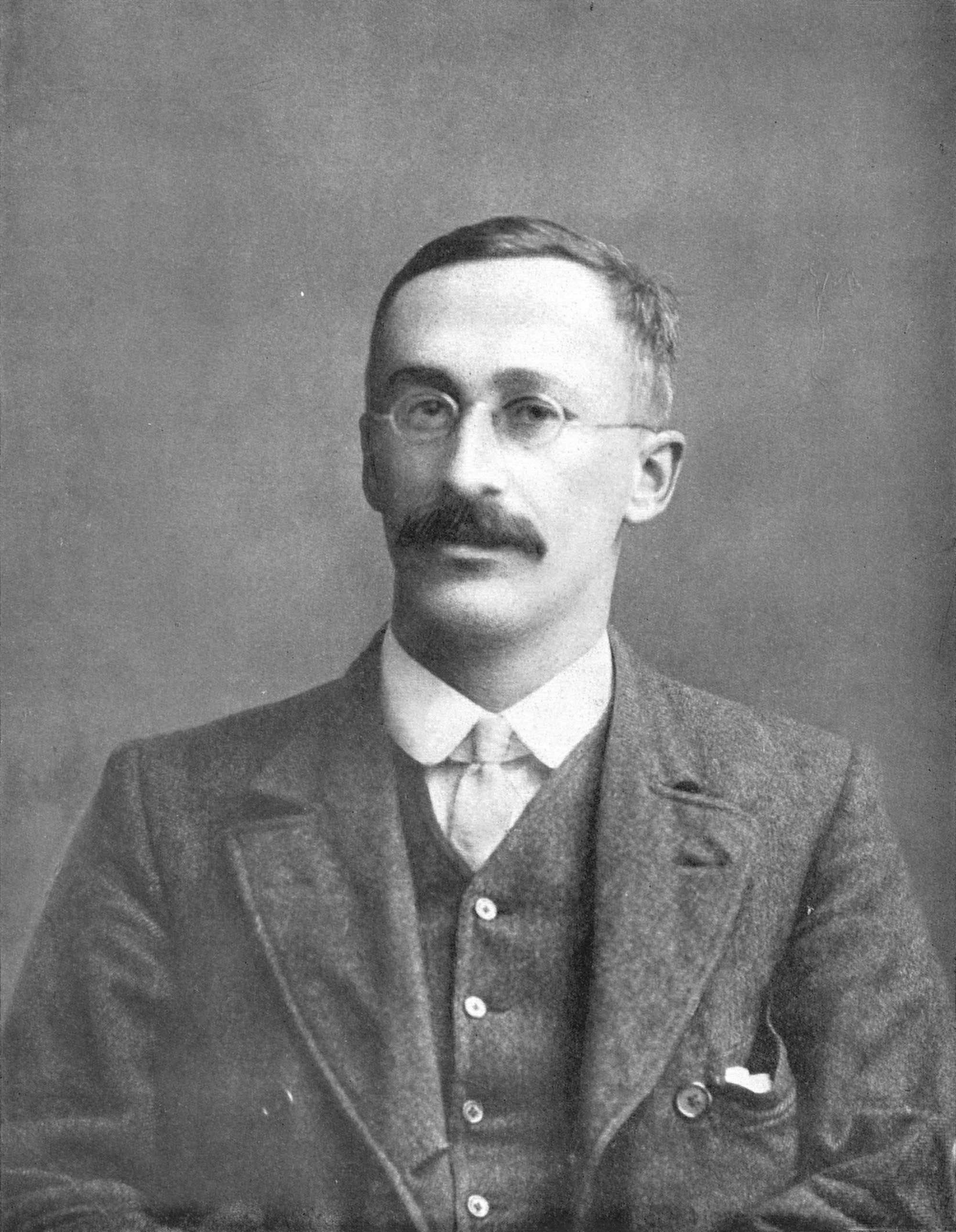
- William Sealy Gosset (aka Student) in 1908 (age 32)
- Born: 13 June 1876; Canterbury, Kent, England
- Died: 16 October 1937 (aged 61); Beaconsfield, Buckinghamshire, England
- Other name: Student
- Education: Winchester College, New College, Oxford
- Known for: Student's t-distribution, statistical significance, design of experiments, Monte Carlo method, quality control, Modern synthesis, agricultural economics, econometrics
- Children: 5, including Isaac Henry Gosset
- Scientific career
- Workplaces: Guinness Brewery

William Sealy Gosset (13 June 1876 – 16 October 1937) was an English statistician, chemist and brewer who worked for Guinness. In statistics, he pioneered small-sample experimental design. Gosset published under the pen name Student and developed Student's t-distribution – originally called Student's "z" – and "Student's test of statistical significance".

== Early life and education ==
William Gosset was born in Canterbury, England the eldest son of Agnes Sealy Vidal and Colonel Frederic Gosset, R.E. Royal Engineers. He attended Winchester College before matriculating as Winchester Scholar in natural sciences and mathematics at New College, Oxford.

== Career ==
Upon graduating in 1884, he joined the brewery of Arthur Guinness & Son in Dublin, Ireland; he spent the rest of his 38-year career at Guinness. In 1904 he wrote an internal report for Guinness titled "The application of the law of error to work of the brewery". He had conducted experiments with only small sample sizes and was aware that analysis was difficult, hence he recommended consulting mathematicians who were knowledgeable in probability theory. In 1906–1907, Guinness sent him to Karl Pearson's laboratory at University College London for two terms.

Gosset and Pearson had a good relationship. Pearson helped Gosset with the mathematics of his papers, including the 1908 papers, but had little appreciation of their importance. The papers addressed the brewer's concern with small samples; biometricians like Pearson, on the other hand, typically had hundreds of observations and saw no urgency in developing small-sample methods.

In his job as Head Experimental Brewer at Guinness, Gosset developed new statistical methods – both in the brewery and on the farm – now central to the design of experiments, to proper use of significance testing on repeated trials, and to analysis of economic significance (an early instance of decision theory interpretation of statistics) and more, such as his small-sample, stratified, and repeated balanced experiments on barley for proving the best yielding varieties. Gosset acquired that knowledge by study, by trial and error, and by cooperating with others.

Gosset's first publication came in 1907, "On the Error of Counting with a Hæmocytometer," in which – unbeknownst to Gosset aka "Student" – he rediscovered the Poisson distribution. After a Guinness researcher published a paper containing information that Guinness management feared might be useful to the company's competitors, it was decided that future publications by Guinness researchers must not mention beer, Guinness, or the author's true name. Gosset may have taken his pen name "Student" from a notebook he kept in 1906 and 1907, "The Student's Science Notebook". Thus his most noteworthy achievement is now called Student's, rather than Gosset's, t-distribution and test of statistical significance.

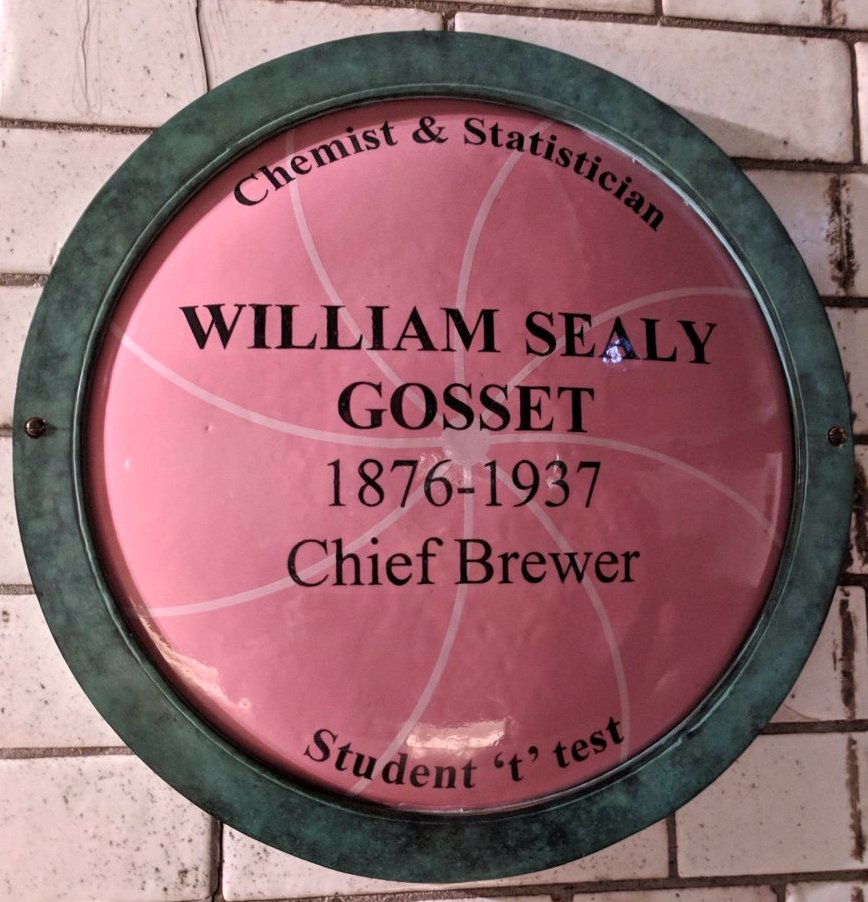
Plaque in the Guinness storehouse commemorating Gosset

Gosset published most of his 21 academic papers, including The probable error of a mean, in Pearson's journal Biometrika under the pseudonym Student. It was, however, not Pearson but Ronald A. Fisher who appreciated the understudied importance of Gosset's small-sample work. Fisher wrote to Gosset in 1912, explaining that Student's z-distribution should be divided by degrees of freedom and not total sample size. From 1912 to 1934 Gosset and Fisher would exchange more than 150 letters. In 1924, Gosset wrote in a letter to Fisher, "I am sending you a copy of Student's Tables as you are the only man that's ever likely to use them!" Fisher believed that Gosset had effected a "logical revolution". In a special issue of Metron in 1925 Student published the corrected tables, now called Student's t $z=\frac{t}{\sqrt{n-1}}$. In the same volume Fisher contributed applications of Student's t-distribution to regression analysis.

Although introduced by others, Studentized residuals are named in Student's honour because, like the problem that led to Student's t-distribution, the idea of adjusting for estimated standard deviations is central to that concept.

Gosset's interest in the cultivation of barley led him to speculate that the design of experiments should aim not only at improving the average yield but also at breeding varieties whose yield was insensitive to variation in soil and climate (that is, "robust"). Gosset called his innovation "balanced layout", because treatments and controls are allocated in a balanced fashion to stratified growing conditions, such as differential soil fertility. Gosset's balanced principle was challenged by Ronald Fisher, who preferred randomized designs. The Bayesian Harold Jeffreys, and Gosset's close associates Jerzy Neyman and Egon S. Pearson sided with Gosset's balanced designs of experiments; however, as Ziliak (2014) has shown, Gosset and Fisher would strongly disagree for the rest of their lives about the meaning and interpretation of balanced versus randomized experiments, as they had earlier clashed on the role of bright-line rules of statistical significance.

== Personal life and death ==
Gosset had three children with Marjory Gosset (née Phillpotts). Harry Gosset (1907–1965) was a consultant paediatrician; Bertha Marian Gosset (1909–2004) was a geographer and nurse; the youngest, Ruth Gosset (1911–1953) married the Oxford mathematician Douglas Roaf and had five children.

Gosset was a friend of both Pearson and Fisher. In respect to his achievements, he responded to an admirer once that "Fisher would have discovered it all anyway."

In 1935, at the age of 59, Gosset left Dublin to take up the position of Head Brewer at a new and second Guinness brewery at Park Royal in northwestern London. In September 1937, Gosset was promoted to Head Brewer of all Guinness. He died one month later, aged 61, in Beaconsfield, England, of a heart attack.

== Bibliography ==
Gosset:

- "The application of the 'law of error' to the work of the Brewery" (1904, Guinness internal report)
- "On the error of counting with hæmacytometer". Biometrika. 5 (3): 351–360. February 1907. doi:10.1093/biomet/5.3.351.
- "The probable error of a mean" (PDF). Biometrika. 6 (1): 1–25. March 1908. doi:10.1093/biomet/6.1.1. hdl:10338.dmlcz/143545.
- "Probable error of a correlation coefficient". Biometrika. 6 (2/3): 302–310. September 1908. doi:10.1093/biomet/6.2-3.302.
- "The distribution of the means of samples which are not drawn at random". Biometrika. 7 (1/2): 210–214. July–October 1909. doi:10.1093/biomet/7.1-2.210.
- "An experimental determination of the probable error of Dr Spearman's correlation coefficients". Biometrika. 13 (2/3): 263–282. July 1921. doi:10.1093/biomet/13.2-3.263.
- "Review of Statistical Methods for Research Workers (R. A. Fisher)". Eugenics Review. 18: 148–150. 1926.
- Zabell, S. L (March 2008). "On Student's 1908 Article "The Probable Error of a Mean" (S.L. Zabell)" (PDF). Journal of the American Statistical Association. 103 (481): 1–7. doi:10.1198/016214508000000030. S2CID 48322195. Archived from the original (PDF) on 20 September 2009.
- "Evolution By Selection: The Implications of Winter's Selection Experiment", 1933, Eugenics Review, 24, p. 293
- 'Student's' Collected Papers (edited by E.S. Pearson and John Wishart, with a foreword by Launce McMullen), London: Biometrika Office. (1942)
