= Laurent Phillpotts =

Laurent Lloyd Phillpotts (30 August 1922 – 11 January 2016) joined the RAF in 1943 after an appeal by King George VI.

He helped set up The West Indian Association of Service Personnel, formerly named The West Indian ex-Servicemen's Association.

In 1956, Laurent Phillpotts launched the first black weekly newspaper Colonial News.

He campaigned for the erection of the Memorial Gates in London, commemorating British forces' black Commonwealth servicemen and women from two World Wars.

With others he pioneered the Association of Jamaicans, the Caribbean Centre and the West Indian Carib Cricket Club.
