= Kent Philpott =

American Baptist pastor

Kent Philpott is an American Baptist pastor, writer and conversion therapy advocate.

== History ==
Philpott was a medic in the United States Air Force from 1961 to 1965, and a pastor at the Church of the Open Door, San Rafael, California, from 1972 to 1980. He became the pastor of Miller Avenue Church in 1984. He has also worked as a private detective and was a volunteer at San Quentin State Prison.

== Bibliography ==
- A Manual of Demonology
- If the Devil Wrote a Bible
