= William Phillpotts =

William John Philpotts (26 May 1807 in Bishop Middleham – 10 July 1888 in St Gluvias) was Archdeacon of Cornwall from 1845 until his death.

== Life ==
William John Phillpotts was the eldest son of Henry Phillpotts, Bishop of Exeter and Deborah Phillpotts née Surtees. He was born at Bishop Middleham while his father was chaplain to the Bishop of Durham. He was educated at Charterhouse School, Laleham School (under headmaster Thomas Arnold) and Oriel College, Oxford, matriculating in 1825, graduating B.A. in 1830, and studying divinity under John Henry Newman.

In 1831, at Exeter, William Phillpotts was ordained deacon, the ceremony being conducted by his own father the Bishop. The first living he held was at Lezant in Cornwall. From 1832 to 1845 he was vicar of Hallow with Grimley in Worcestershire. In 1845 he succeeded the Venerable John Sheepshanks as Archdeacon of Cornwall and vicar of St Gluvias near Penryn. He remained in both posts for the rest of his life. In 1860 he was additionally appointed Chancellor of the diocese.

In November 1832 William Phillpotts married Louisa Buller (1803-1871), daughter of James Buller (1766-1827), sometime Member of Parliament for Exeter, and sister of James Wentworth Buller, also a Member of Parliament. The couple had nine children of whom the best known was James Surtees Phillpotts (1839-1930), headmaster of Bedford School. Their eldest son, Rev Henry Phillpotts (1833-1919), was the father of Brigadier General Louis Murray Phillpotts and Admiral Edward Montgomery Phillpotts (captain of HMS Warspite (03) at the Battle of Jutland.

Archdeacon Phillpotts died at St Gluvias vicarage on 10 July 1888. Until a few weeks before his death he had continued to carry out all his regular duties. According to an obituary note in Truth magazine he had been respected as "a man of strong common sense and excellent judgment".

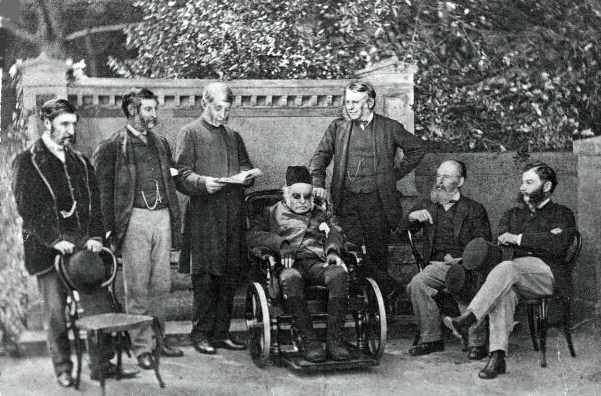
William Phillpotts (holding book) with brothers and their father Bishop Henry Phillpotts, 1868

Church of England titles
Preceded by John Sheepshanks	Archdeacon of Cornwall; 1845–1885	Succeeded by John Rundle Cornish
