= Wade Edward Philpott =

American mathematician (1918–1985)

Wade Edward Philpott (1918–1985) was an American mathematician and puzzle maker. Several of his puzzles have gone on to become best sellers.

== Life ==
Philpott was born in Sunnyside, Washington, in 1918 as Chester Wade Edwards. He was the son of Chester E. Edwards and Mary Ream Edwards. Later, he was adopted by Viola Ream Philpott, and George Austin Philpott, his aunt and uncle. In 1921, his name was changed from Chester Wade Edwards to Wade Edward Philpott. Philpott graduated from Ohio Northern University with a degree in engineering. He married Myra Given in 1941. In 1947, a shooting accident left him paralyzed. During his long hospitalization, he developed an interest in recreational mathematics and puzzles.

Philpott produced several puzzles during his lifetime. Two of his best known puzzles are Multimatch and Sweep. His games and puzzles were sold by Kadon Enterprises, Inc. Philpott also published several of his works in the Journal of Recreational Mathematics.
