= James Surtees Phillpotts =

British headmaster (1839–1930)

- portrait by Arthur Hacker R.A.
- Born: 18 July 1839; Cornwall
- Died: 16 October 1930 (aged 91); Tunbridge Wells

James Surtees Phillpotts (18 July 1839 – 16 October 1930) was a reforming Headmaster of Bedford School and the author and editor of a number of educational books.

Phillpotts served as a staff member of Rugby School from 1862 to 1874, and he was appointed Headmaster of Bedford School in 1875. Bedford had an indifferent record as an educational institution, and relatively few students on roll. Phillpotts initiated school reforms in an attempt to emulate the success of Rugby School. He introduced the natural sciences into the school's curriculum, and established laboratories for both chemistry and physics. He also established workshops for carpentry and engineering. He organized school sports with the goal of fostering team spirit. He secured financial backing for more spacious premises for the school, and the new facilities had their official opening in 1891. By the time of Phillpotts' retirement in 1903, the school had nearly 900 students. The development of Bedford Grammar School from an obscure provincial institution to one of England's leading public schools had a significant effect on the economy and size of the nearby town of Bedford.

According to a caricature of Phillpotts by one of his former students, Phillpotts' small grey eyes were deadly cold when confronting an opponent, and his calm voice did not reveal his inner anger. But he inevitably came down on his opponents like a steam hammer and pulverized them."

== Biography ==
Born in Cornwall on 18 July 1839, James Surtees Phillpotts was a grandson of Henry Phillpotts, the well known polemicist and Anglican Bishop of Exeter. William Phillpotts, his father, was Archdeacon of Cornwall and vicar of St Gluvias church, Penryn. His mother Louisa Buller was the sister of James Wentworth Buller M.P. and an aunt of General Sir Redvers Henry Buller.

James Phillpotts was educated at Winchester College and at New College, Oxford, where, in accordance with the provisions that existed at that time, he was elected a Fellow on going up in 1858. He won the Stanhope Prize in 1859. He passed his Honour Moderations (Mods) in Classics in 1860 and his Literae Humaniores (Greats) in 1862, achieving a first class in both and thus completing his B.A. degree. Thereupon he immediately proceeded to the B.C.L. degree. While at Oxford he won the mile race in the University Sports. In the summer of 1863, with his friends Robertson and Chaytor, he ascended the Jungfrau peak in Switzerland, a notable feat at the time. On leaving university he joined the staff of Rugby School where, from 1862 to 1874, he was an Assistant Master under the headmastership of Frederick Temple. In 1875, he was appointed Headmaster of Bedford School. During his period in office he undertook major reform of the school. He retired in 1903. For the remainder of his life he lived at The Ousels, Tunbridge Wells. During his retirement he served as a member of the Education Committee of Bedfordshire County Council. He died in Tunbridge Wells on 16 October 1930. In its obituary The Times described him as "one of the great headmasters of the last century".

== Headmastership of Bedford School ==
When James Surtees Phillpotts took over as headmaster Bedford Grammar School (as it then was) had an indifferent record as an educational institution. There were about 250 boys on roll, most of them day students. With Rugby School as his model, Phillpotts set about reforming the school in every way. One of his first acts was to introduce the Natural Sciences into the curriculum. He saw to the establishment of chemistry and physics laboratories, and went on to add carpentry and engineering workshops, a gymnasium and five courts. Under his leadership sports were properly organized and used as a tool to foster team spirit. In all the changes he introduced Phillpotts' underlying aim was to produce upright, public spirited citizens well equipped for the challenges of the rapidly changing world in which they lived.

As a result of the various developments initiated by James Surtees Phillpotts the school ran out of space in its original town centre location. Foreseeing the need to move to more spacious premises Phillpotts secured suitable land on his own initiative. In due course the school trustees backed his plan for new buildings on the new site and arranged the necessary finance. In 1891 the official opening of the new school took place, with a ceremonial procession from the old premises to the new. The roll of pupils was then around 600, and by 1903 when Phillpotts retired it had risen to nearly 900.

The development of Bedford Grammar School from an obscure provincial institution to one of England's leading public schools had a significant effect on the economy and size of Bedford town.

== Family ==
In 1868, while working at Rugby School, James Surtees Phillpotts married Marian Hadfield Cordery, daughter of John Cordery of Weatherall House, Hampstead. She was a sister of Henrietta, wife of Phillpotts' then colleague at Rugby, T.W. Jex-Blake. The couple had seven children, the eldest of whom died in early infancy. Among the remaining six the most notable was Dame Bertha Surtees Phillpotts, the Icelandic scholar. His youngest daughter, Marjory Surtees Phillpotts captained the England Ladies Hockey Team and married William Sealy Gosset. Owen Surtees Phillpotts O.B.E. had a distinguished career in the diplomatic service. Lieutenant Colonel Brian Surtees Phillpotts D.S.O., R.E. died a hero's death in the First World War.

== Personality ==
A frank caricature of J.S. Phillpotts' charismatic personality is contained in an article by a former pupil of his which was published in The Pioneer (an Indian journal) in 1903 and was quoted many years later in a Bedford newspaper.

"He had a pale and thoughtful face, deep sunken candid eyes, bushy eyebrows, and a full flowing beard. His head was small, but well-shaped; his forehead broad and prominent, but not high. He was tall, burly, and broad-shouldered; all his movements were quick; his walk, his conversation, his expression, everything he did, was marked with an energy which recalled the idea of a steam-engine in trousers."

"He was invariably badly dressed, and never looked so well in anything as in his cap and gown. In general appearance he was something like Ruskin; but although he sometimes liked to talk art, he knew practically nothing about it. He would insist on making speeches although he was the worst speaker in England; he would insist on trying to talk French and German, although he had the vilest accent ever heard. When he tried to tell a joke or relate a comic story, it was pain and misery to listen; when he danced, his movements were those of a half-tamed buffalo; when he played whist he invariably fell asleep in the middle of the rubber."

"The sight of J. S. Phillpotts at bay was one never to be forgotten. Those small grey eyes had no more expression in them than two drops of frozen water, but they had the deadly coldness that might be felt. There was not the slightest trace of anger in the calm, measured accents of the low, keen voice which cut like a razor... And when he had stated his side of the case he came down on his opponents like a steam-hammer on a bandbox and pulverized them."

== Photographs ==
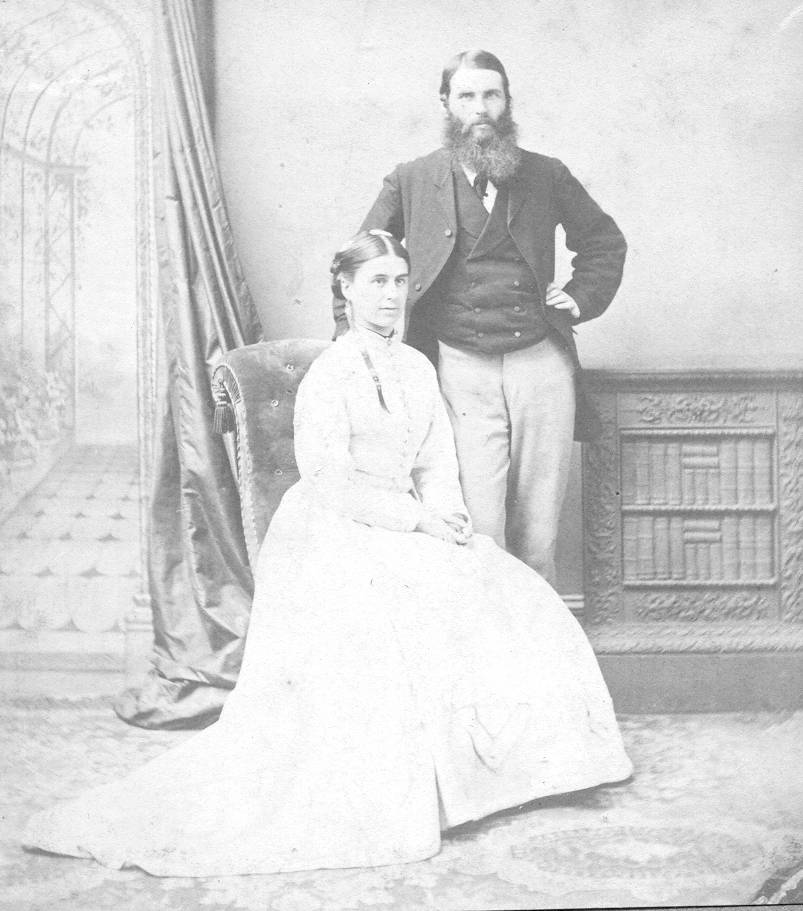
J.S. Phillpotts with wife Marian, c. 1870

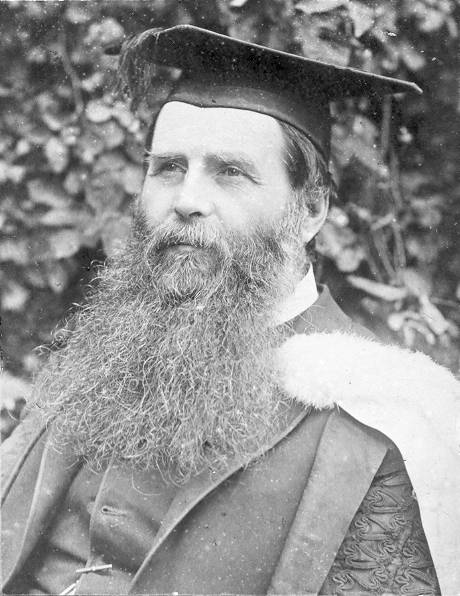
J.S. Phillpotts as Headmaster of Bedford School, c. 1885

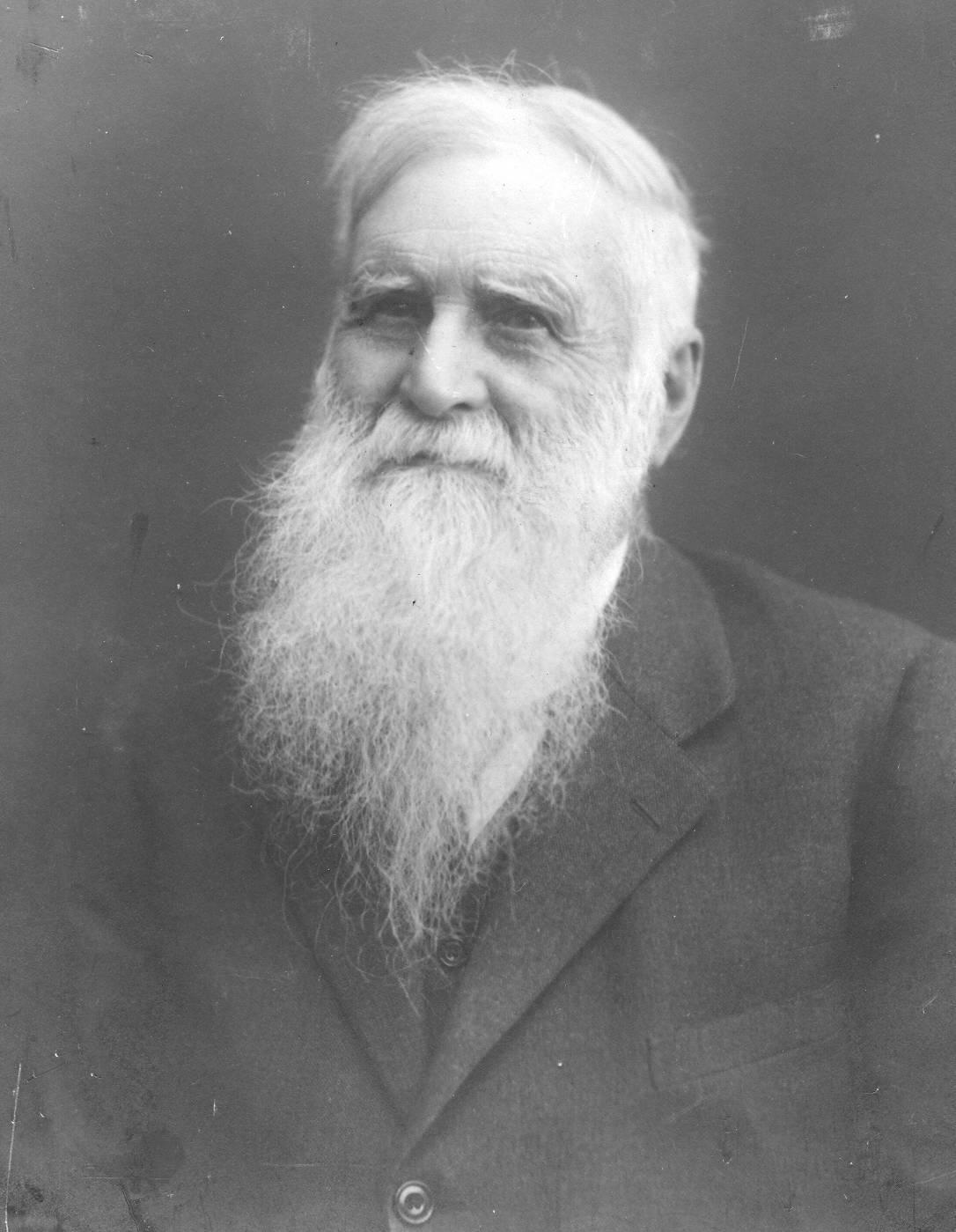
J.S. Phillpotts at the age of 90, 1929

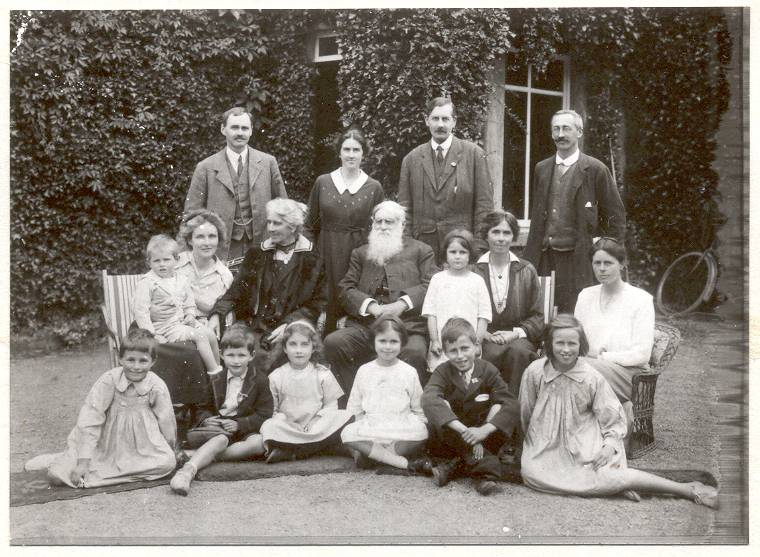
J.S. Phillpotts and his wife Marian on their golden wedding anniversary, together with descendants, 1918

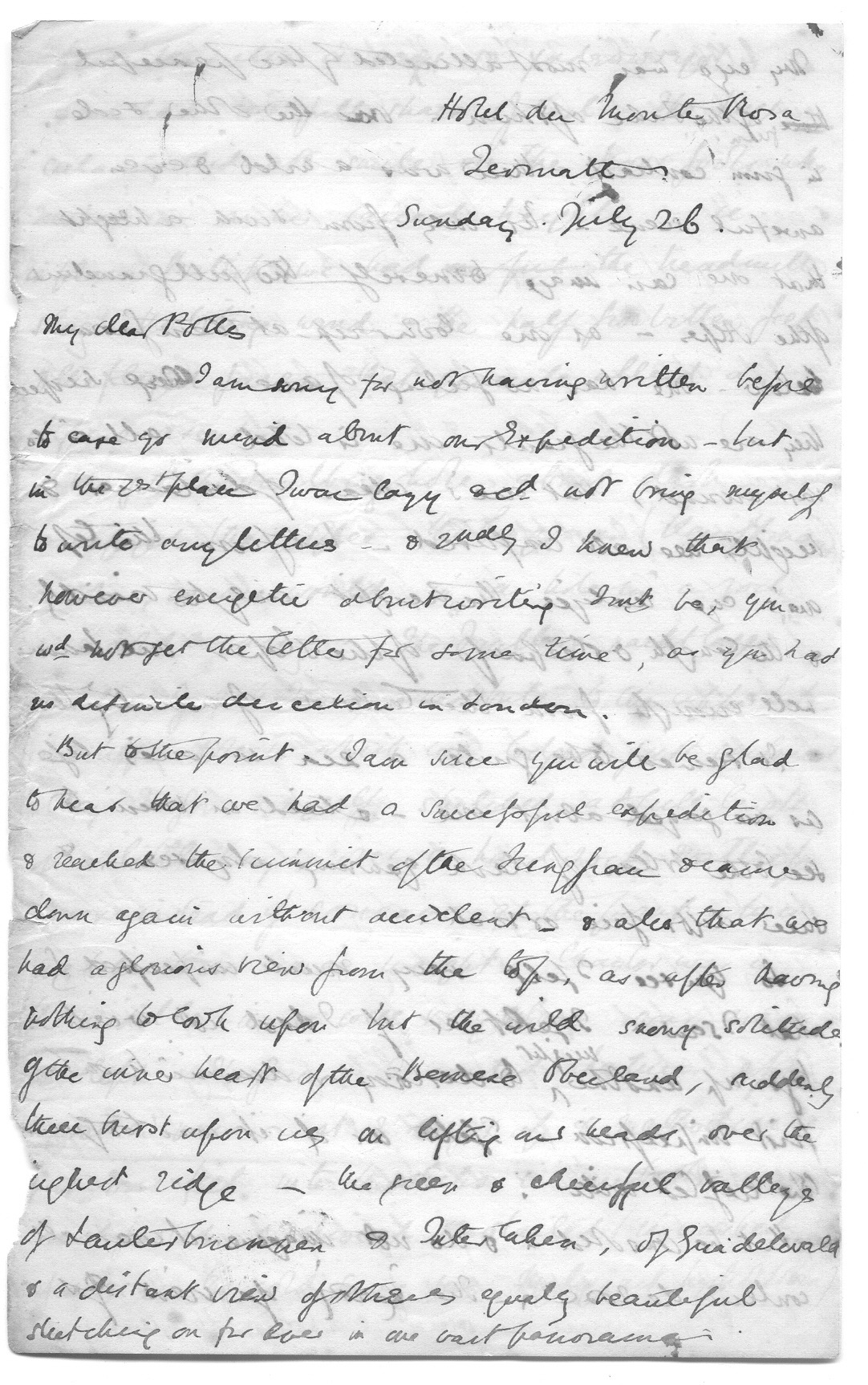
First page of a letter written by J.S. Phillpotts to Alexander Potts, July 1863

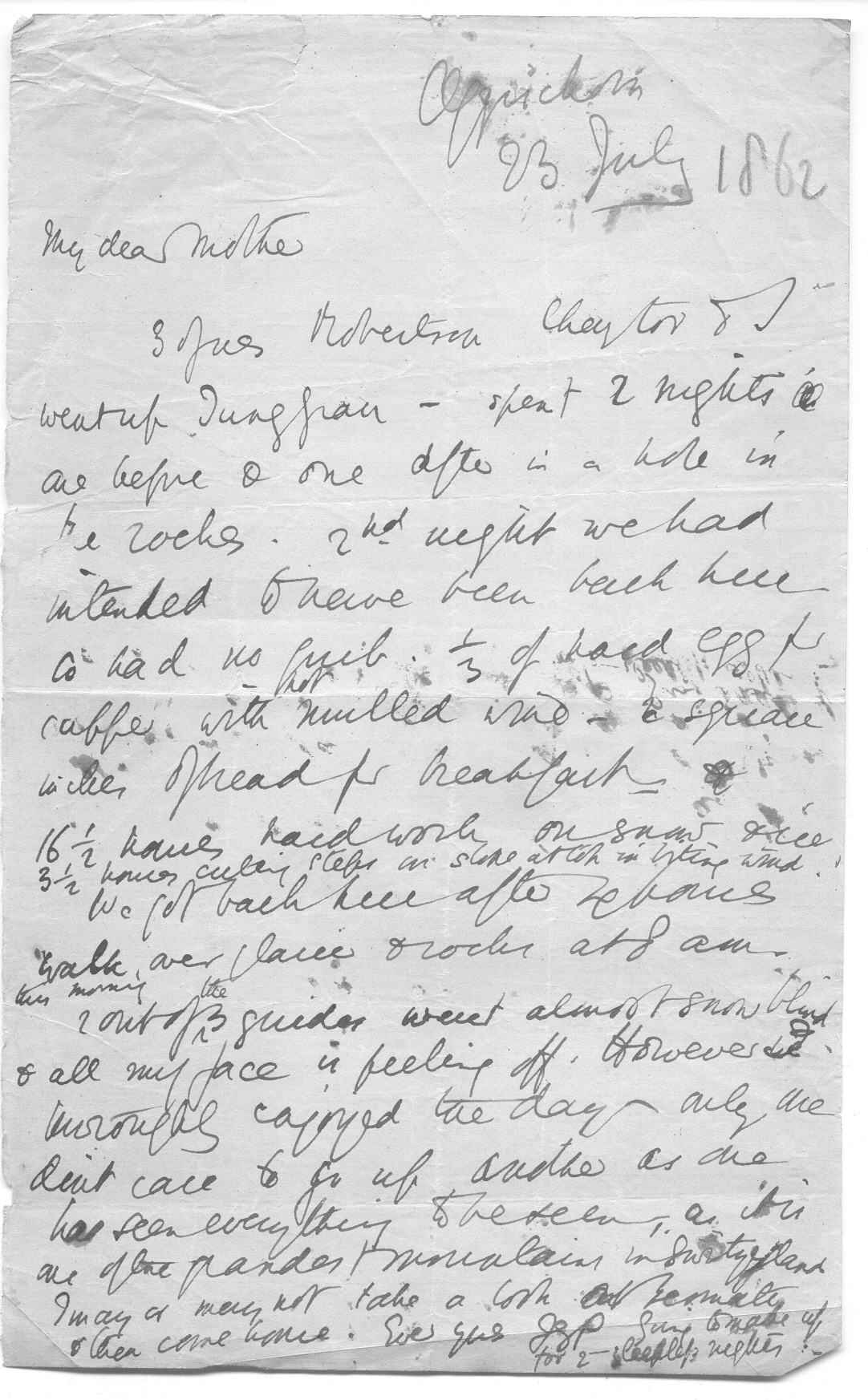
Letter written by J.S. Phillpotts after ascending the Jungfrau, July 1863. (Wrongly marked 1862.)

== Publications ==
- Stories from Herodotus in Attic Greek, Longman, 1874
- King and Commonwealth: A History of Charles I and the Great Rebellion, 1876 (with Bertha Meriton Gardiner (1845–1925))
- Shakespeare's Tempest, Rivington, 1876
- Homer without a Lexicon for Beginners, Rivington, 1876
- Psalms Chronologically Arranged, Macmillan, 1880
- Selections Adapted from Xenophon, Oxford University Press, 1883
