= Brian Surtees Phillpotts =

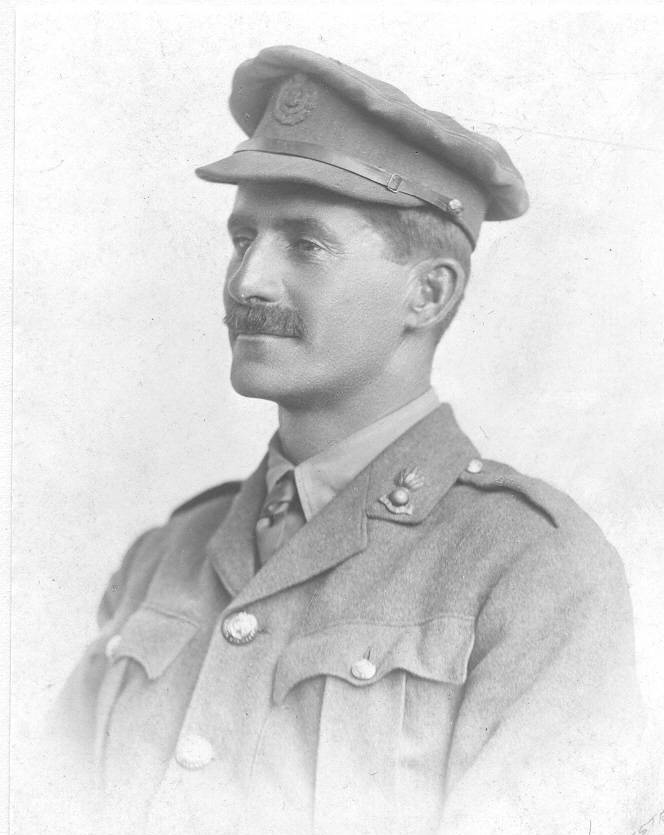
- Lt Col Brian Surtees Phillpotts
- Born: 1875; Bedford, England
- Died: 4 September 1917 (aged 41–42); Ypres, Belgium
- Military career
- Allegiance: United Kingdom
- Branch: British Army
- Service years: 1895–1917
- Rank: Lieutenant-Colonel
- Nickname: Broo
- Unit: Royal Engineers
- Conflicts: First World War
- Awards: Distinguished Service Order

Brian Surtees Phillpotts DSO (1875 – 4 September 1917) was an officer of the Royal Engineers who fought in the First World War and was awarded the Distinguished Service Order. He was killed in action in September 1917.

== Biography ==
Brian "Broo" Surtees Phillpotts was the second surviving son of James Surtees Phillpotts, the reforming headmaster of Bedford School, and of Marian Hadfield Phillpotts. His sisters included Dame Bertha Surtees Phillpotts, a scholar of Scandinavian studies, and Marjory Surtees Phillpotts, captain of the England Ladies Hockey Team.

He was born in 1875 and educated at Bedford School, where he showed an aptitude for craft work including the construction of small boats. He opted for a military career and in 1893 entered the Royal Military Academy, Woolwich (headquarters of the Royal Corps of Engineers), from where he pursued a course at the Royal School of Military Engineering in Chatham. After leaving Chatham he specialised in submarine mining and was stationed successively at Plymouth, Bermuda, Halifax (Nova Scotia), Gravesend and Hong Kong. He was in charge of the submarine defences of the Thames till these were transferred to the Navy. When the Great War broke out he was at Fort Camden, County Cork. He was promoted major on 30 October 1914 and appointed to train a field company, which he took to the front in September 1915. In the autumn of 1916 he was appointed chief royal engineer of a division, with the rank of lieutenant colonel. He was slightly wounded in the Somme offensive. He was mentioned in despatches twice in 1916 and once again in 1917, and received the Distinguished Service Order in January 1917. He was wounded in action on 2 September 1917 and died of his wounds two days later.

== Character ==
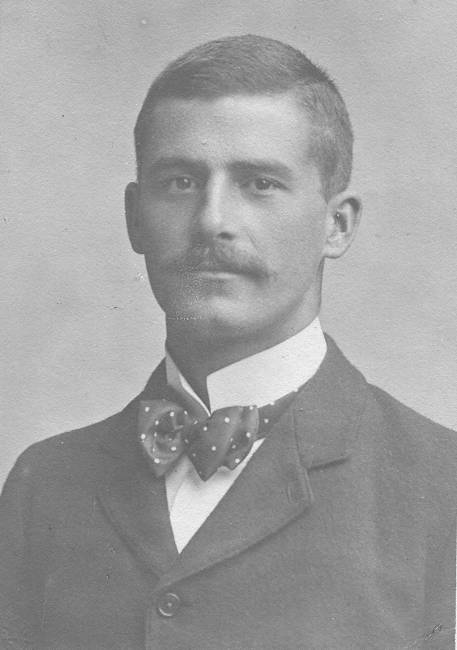
Brian "Broo" Phillpotts as a young man

Phillpotts' hobbies included chemistry, electricity, sailing, and mechanics. As a student, he conducted experiments involving explosives and survived more than one accident. He sailed small homemade boats constructed from painted calico stretched over a lath framework. During his military service, he owned a car and performed its maintenance and repairs himself. He also kept a working lathe in his quarters.

"Anyone who met "Broo" Phillpotts could not fail to be attracted by the charm of his manner, by his unfailing good humour and by his complete lack of 'side'. Perhaps the most distinctive trait in his character was the independence of his thought and judgment and also of his actions, coupled as it was with the widest tolerance of the views of others. Where there was any work to be done, whether on duty or in connection with any of his hobbies, there was no shirking. He would not allow himself to be defeated, and his unerring instinct and ingenuity generally led him straight to the essential result by the shortest cut."

== Exploits on the War Front ==
In preparation for the July 1916 offensive Major Phillpotts had to plan and supervise the construction of trenches for the assault troops within 150 yards of the enemy's position, and also the construction of roads and tramway lines so that ammunition, rations, water and other supplies could be transported up to the front. Later he was charged with the extension of the tramway lines into the enemy's position and the bridging of a canal. All these tasks had to be carried out under constant shell fire.

"[Phillpotts] always appeared perfectly oblivious to danger. No officer ever set a finer example of utter contempt of all danger. He showed to others what could be done in overcoming what appeared to be insurmountable obstacles. The weather and the state of the ground were appalling, yet he overcame them, and in a very short space of time we had a tramway and two roads up to our new front line in the captured position. This was over two and a half miles of Flanders mud, waist deep in most places. Mainly through his exertions the Infantry in the front line had their full rations and were kept supplied with everything."

In 1916 the headquarters for Phillpotts' company were established at Ville-sous-Corbie. A large barn in a barren field was all the accommodation available. Within a fortnight Major Phillpotts made comfortable beds of timber and wire netting for everyone as well as cook houses and stables. He rigged up a simple crane and installed a band saw, two circular saws, a drilling machine, a lathe and a grindstone. All this equipment was driven from one shaft by two ten horsepower steam engines and a small petrol engine. Most of the machinery was salvaged from damaged French factories at Albert. The saws were used to form beams and sleepers out of logs culled from nearby woods. The waste wood chippings and bark were used as fuel to heat water for two communal bath tubs set up by the major.

During the Somme operation Major Phillpotts also constructed improvised shelters consisting of curved steel bowers made of salvaged lengths of rail covered over and reinforced with timber and sandbags. "Such covers saved many lives during the eight days' bombardment which preceded the July offensive in 1916."

"After repeated attacks had failed to capture Fricourt, and whilst a bombardment of the village was taking place, [Major Phillpotts] got out of our front line trench and waved his hat. Finding no one shot at him, he walked across, in the open, to a point two hundred yards in front of Fricourt Farm, an enemy strong point. Again finding no one shot him on his waving his hat, he returned to our line and sent this message to Divisional Headquarters 'Only thing stopping our Infantry entering Fricourt is our artillery barrage!'"
