= Philpots Island =

Island in Nunavut, Canada

- Location within Nunavut Location within Canada

Geography
- Location: Northern Canada
- Coordinates: 74°57′N 079°58′W
- Archipelago: Queen Elizabeth Islands; Arctic Archipelago

Administration
- Canada
- Territory: Nunavut
- Region: Qikiqtaaluk

Demographics
- Population: Uninhabited

Philpots Island is a member of the Queen Elizabeth Islands and the Arctic Archipelago in the territory of Nunavut. It is the largest of Devon Island's offshore islands, located at Devon's eastern end. It lies in Baffin Bay, with Hyde Inlet to the north, and the Parry Channel to the south.

Philpots Island is home to northern fulmars, glaucous gulls, and ivory gulls
