= Reeta Devi (social worker) =

Founder of the Indian NGO, Ila Trust

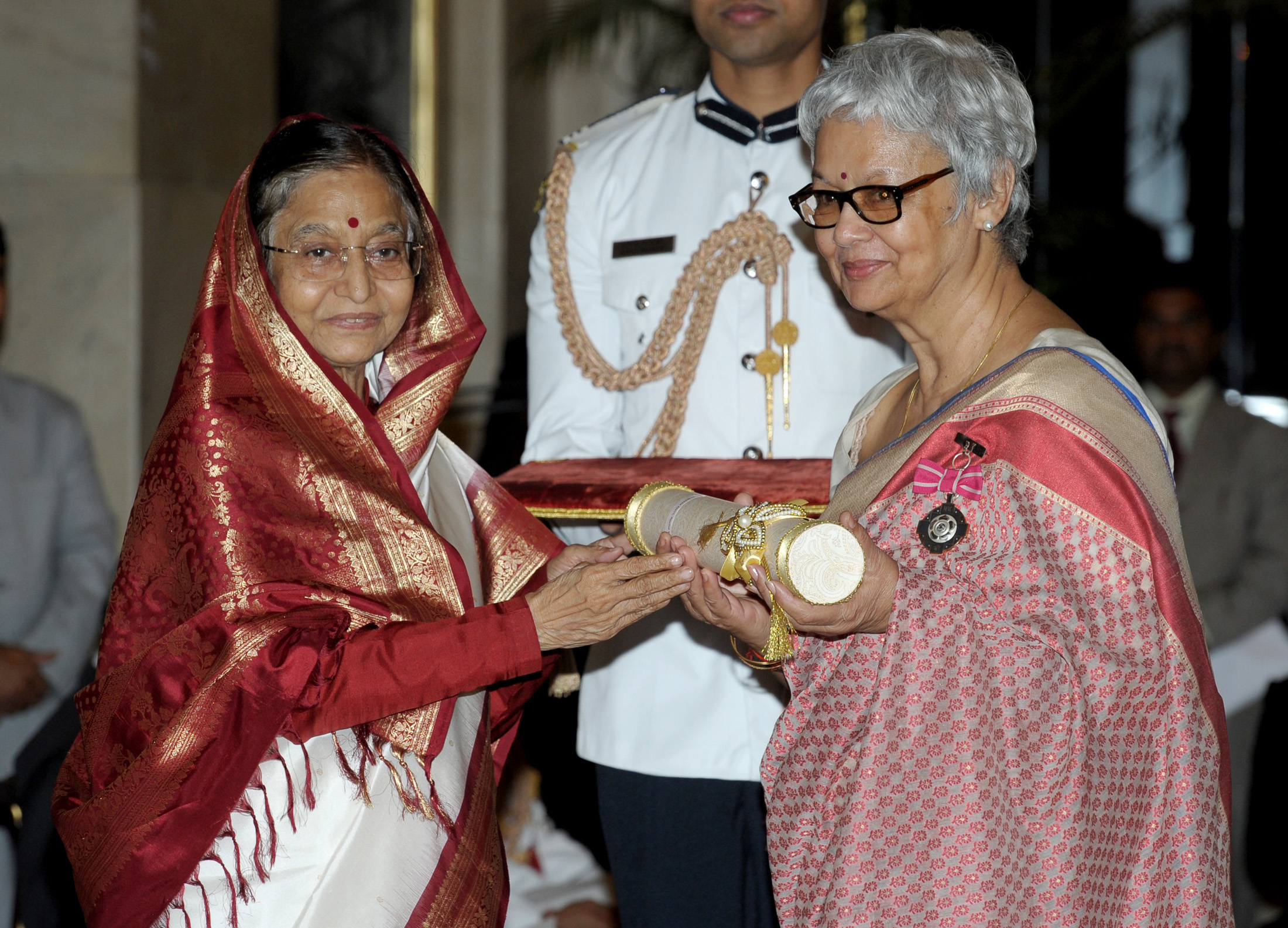
- The President, Smt. Pratibha Devisingh Patil presenting the Padma Shri Award to Smt. Reeta Devi
- Born: 11 October 1942 (age 83); Assam, India
- Occupation: Social worker
- Spouse: Manvendra Kishore Dev Burman
- Parent(s): Dhirendra Roy Chaudhary; Kamala
- Awards: Padma Shri
- Website: Official web site

Reeta Singh is an Indian social worker and the founder of the Delhi-based non governmental organization, Ila Trust. She was honored by the Government of India, in 2012, with the fourth highest Indian civilian award of Padma Shri.

== Biography ==
When you see a 13-year-old who has to abort a four-month foetus by her own father, then you realize your whole life has been wasted. You realize how useless you are. Between the law, the press, and the army of do-gooders, the child's put away in the cupboard, says Reeta Devi.

Reeta Devi, née Reeta Roy, was born on 11 October 1942, in a rich zamindari family in Assam to Dhirendra Roy Chaudhary, a tea broker and Kamala, a doctoral degree holder and reported to be the first woman lecturer of Botany at the Cotton College, Guwahati, Assam. After her graduation, she joined British Airways as an air hostess, against the will of her father, but later, moved to Air India, when she felt the British airline did not offer her opportunity to fly to farther regions. She got married in November 1964, to Manvendra Kishore Dev Burman (Bhim), who came from the royal family of Tripura and was the nephew of Gayatri Devi, the third Maharani of Jaipur.

Devi, an avid horse racing fan and a regular at the Friday races at the Kolkata Race Course, who gave a part of her winnings to the Missionaries of Charity of Mother Teresa, led a busy social life. She is reported to have been the subject of portraits of renowned photographers such as David Bailey and Anthony Snowdon and has made a cameo appearance, as herself, in the 1971 Satyajit Ray movie, Seemabaddha.

Manvendra Kishore Dev Burman, Devi's husband, whose favorite past time was twice daily feeding the stray dogs of Khan Market area of Delhi, has since died, leaving her no children. She lives in Delhi, in the neighbourhood where the renowned writer, Kushwant Singh lived, attending to her duties as the head of Ila Trust.

== Ila Trust and social career ==
Reeta Devi has been associated with Mother Teresa from the age of sixteen and the Blessed Nun of Kolkata is reported to have inspired Devi in her social career. Devi visited the refugee camps in the aftermath of the 1971 Bangladesh Liberation War, living in the camps to take care of the victims. She used to be a frequent visitor to Nirmal Hriday, a hospice set up by Mother Teresa for the sick, destitute and the dying where she cleaned the floors and attended to the inmates.

In order to streamline her social activities, Reeta Devi founded Ila Trust, a non governmental organization named after her mother in Law, Ila Devi, on 26 October 1994. The next year, she launched the first ambulance service with doctors and paramedical staff in Guwahati and in 1996, she assisted in the establishment of a hospice for the Missionaries of Charity. One year later, in 1997, she set up another hospice for AIDS victims at a tribal village in Assam.

Reeta Devi moved her activity to Delhi and the first mobile clinic for the capital city was started in 2003. The same year, the trust built a hospice for HIV and Tuberculosis patients at Betkuchi, Guwahati. It is reported that Devi sold her vehicle to raise the money for the construction. The centre, a twenty bedded unit, was donated to Snehalaya, a charity organization run by Fatima sisters of the catholic community and is now called Ila Snehalaya.

The second Delhi based unit was started in 2007 with the assistance of Elton John Aids Foundation, followed by the third unit in 2012. The mobile clinic network of Ila Trust is staffed by 12 doctors, 4 pharmacists, 6 screeners, 3 drivers and 2 administration personnel. Reeta Devi was successful in inducting a few highly trained medical doctors to work with the network. The mobile units provide medical service to the poor at various locations in Delhi six days a week and Diagnoses, tests, treatments and medicines are provided free of cost. The units are equipped with Electronic Medical Record (EMR) System, developed by the Trust.

The Trust operates from its office at Sujan Singh Park, New Delhi and raises the required funds through donations and charity events.

== See also ==
- Missionaries of Charity
- Mother Teresa
- Nirmal Hriday
- Elton John Aids Foundation
