= Mother Teresa: No Greater Love =

- Directed by: David Naglieri
- Written by: David Naglieri
- Produced by: David Naglieri; James M. Wahlberg
- Starring: Brian Kolodiejchuk; Patrick Kelly; Sister Mary Bernice; George Weigel; Konrad Krajewski
- Music by: Sean Beeson
- Production company: Castletown Media
- Distributed by: Fathom Events
- Release date: October 3, 2022
- Running time: 115 minutes
- Country: United States
- Language: English

Mother Teresa: No Greater Love is an American documentary film about the life of Mother Teresa which stars Brian Kolodiejchuk, Patrick Kelly, Bishop Robert Barron, Cardinal Konrad Krajewski, Sister Mary Bernice and George Weigel. The film directed, written and produced by David Naglieri and it was released in a limited number of theaters across the United States on October 3 and 4, 2022.

== Plot ==
The film reveals unusual access to institutional archives and features Missionaries of Charity missionaries and how her vision to serve Christ among the poor is being implemented today through the Missionaries of Charity.

== Cast ==
- Brian Kolodiejchuk
- Patrick Kelly
- Sister Mary Bernice
- George Weigel
- Jim Wahlberg
- Sister Prema
- Bishop Robert Barron
- Cardinal Konrad Krajewski
