= Joseph Langford =

American Roman Catholic priest and author

Father Joseph Langford MC

Personal life
- Born: June 25, 1951 Toledo, Ohio
- Died: October 14, 2010 (aged 59) Tijuana, Mexico

Religious life
- Religion: Roman Catholic

Joseph Langford (1951–2010) was an American Roman Catholic priest and author. He co-founded the Missionaries of Charity Fathers with Saint Teresa of Calcutta (Mother Teresa).

== Early life and education ==
He was born on June 15, 1951, in Toledo, Ohio, to Martha Jane Gelin Langford (1924–2015) and Gerald J. Langford (1918–1997). They relocated to San Diego, where he went to Our Lady of Grace Catholic School in nearby El Cajon, and University of San Diego High School, graduating in 1969. After theological studies beginning in 1972 in Rome, he was ordained a priest of the Oblates of the Virgin Mary in 1978. He spoke fluent Italian and Spanish.

== Ministry ==
Mother Teresa had already formed the Missionaries of Charity Brothers in 1963. However, she had long expressed a desire for priests to be affiliated with her congregation. In 1972 in Rome, after Joseph Langford read Malcolm Muggeridge's book Something Beautiful for God, he felt called to unite with Mother Teresa. At first he volunteered with the congregation's sisters in Rome, serving at a homeless shelter near the Colosseum. Langford met Mother Teresa several times in Rome as he proceeded towards ordination, as Rome was a frequent stop-off between Calcutta and other world destinations.

Langford stated in interviews that he originally desired to join the Missionaries of Charity Brothers, but could not as he felt called to become a priest, leading to him developing the idea for an affiliated congregation in which priests could serve. The congregation began in the summer of 1983 as the Corpus Christi Movement, which became the Missionaries of Charity Fathers in 1983. (Note: Some sources state the congregation began in 1981.) Both Mother Teresa and Langford visited the Vatican and the Sacred Congregation for the Doctrine of the Faith to seek permission for the initial group, which was granted by Archbishop Jerome Hamer. They set up the first house in the South Bronx, where he wrote the congregation's constitutions. In 1996 they moved the congregation to Tijuana, Mexico, which had similar challenges with poverty as Calcutta, India.

== Books ==
- Mother Teresa's Secret Fire: The Encounter that Changed Her Life, and How It Can Transform Your Own (Our Sunday Visitor, 2008). ISBN 978-1-59276-309-2.
- Mother Teresa: In the Shadow of Our Lady: Sharing Mother Teresa's Mystical Relationship With Mary (Our Sunday Visitor, 2007).
- I Thirst: 40 Days With Mother Teresa (Augustine Institute, 2018, posthumous).
