= Mother Teresa of Calcutta (film) =

2003 Italian biographical film

- Genre: Biography
- Written by: Francesco Scardamaglia; Massimo Cerofolini
- Directed by: Fabrizio Costa
- Starring: Olivia Hussey
- Theme music composer: Guy Farley
- Country of origin: Italy
- Original language: English

Production
- Producer: Anselmo Parrinello
- Editor: Alessandro Lucidi
- Running time: 176 minutes

Original release
- Release: 19 October 2003

Mother Teresa of Calcutta is a 2003 Italian biographical television film based on the life of Mother Teresa, the founder of the Missionaries of Charity religious institute. The film stars Olivia Hussey in the title role and received a CAMIE award in 2007. The film was originally produced as the Italian television miniseries Madre Teresa.

== Cast information ==
- Olivia Hussey as Mother Teresa
- Sebastiano Somma as Father Serrano: a Vatican priest sent to evaluate Mother Teresa's application for the founding of the Missionaries of Charity. Initially sceptical, he eventually becomes a follower of Mother Teresa.
- Michael Mendl as Celeste van Exem: Mother Teresa's long-time spiritual director.
- Laura Morante as Mother Cenacle
- Ingrid Rubio as Sister Agnes/Virginia
- Guillermo Ayesa as Perier
- Valeria Cavalli as Drane
- Enzo De Caro as Enzo Decaro
- Morgane Slemp as Silvia
- Antonia Frering as Sister Stephanie
- Emily Hamilton as Anna
- Eve Karpf as Virginia
- Ravindra Randeniya as Police Chief
- Daya Alwis as Kaligarth seller
- W. Jayasiri as Mr. Goma

== See also ==
- Mother Teresa: In the Name of God's Poor, 1997 film.
