= Kalighat Home for the Dying =

Hospice in Kolkata founded by Mother Teresa

Coordinates: 22°31′13.1″N 88°20′29.8″E

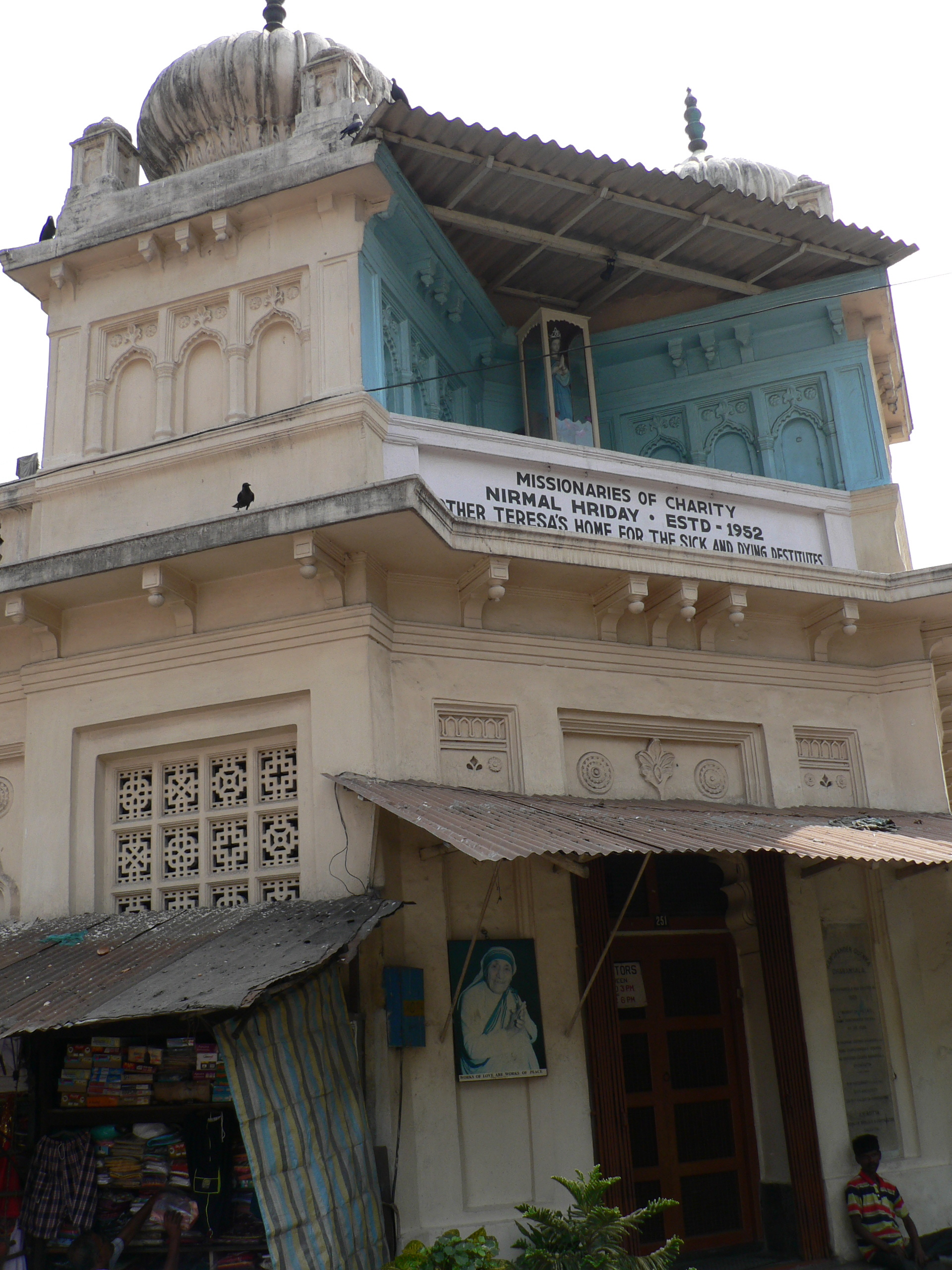
Nirmal Hriday facade, c. 2007

Kalighat, the Home of the Pure Heart (Nirmal Hriday) (formerly Mother Teresa's Kalighat Home for the Dying Destitutes) is a hospice for the sick, destitute and the dying established by St. Mother Teresa in Kalighat, Kolkata, India. Before Mother Teresa sought permission to use it, the building was an old, abandoned dharamshala adjacent to the Kalighat Kali temple. It was founded by St. Mother Teresa on her 42nd birthday in 1952, two years after she established the Missionaries of Charity in Kolkata.

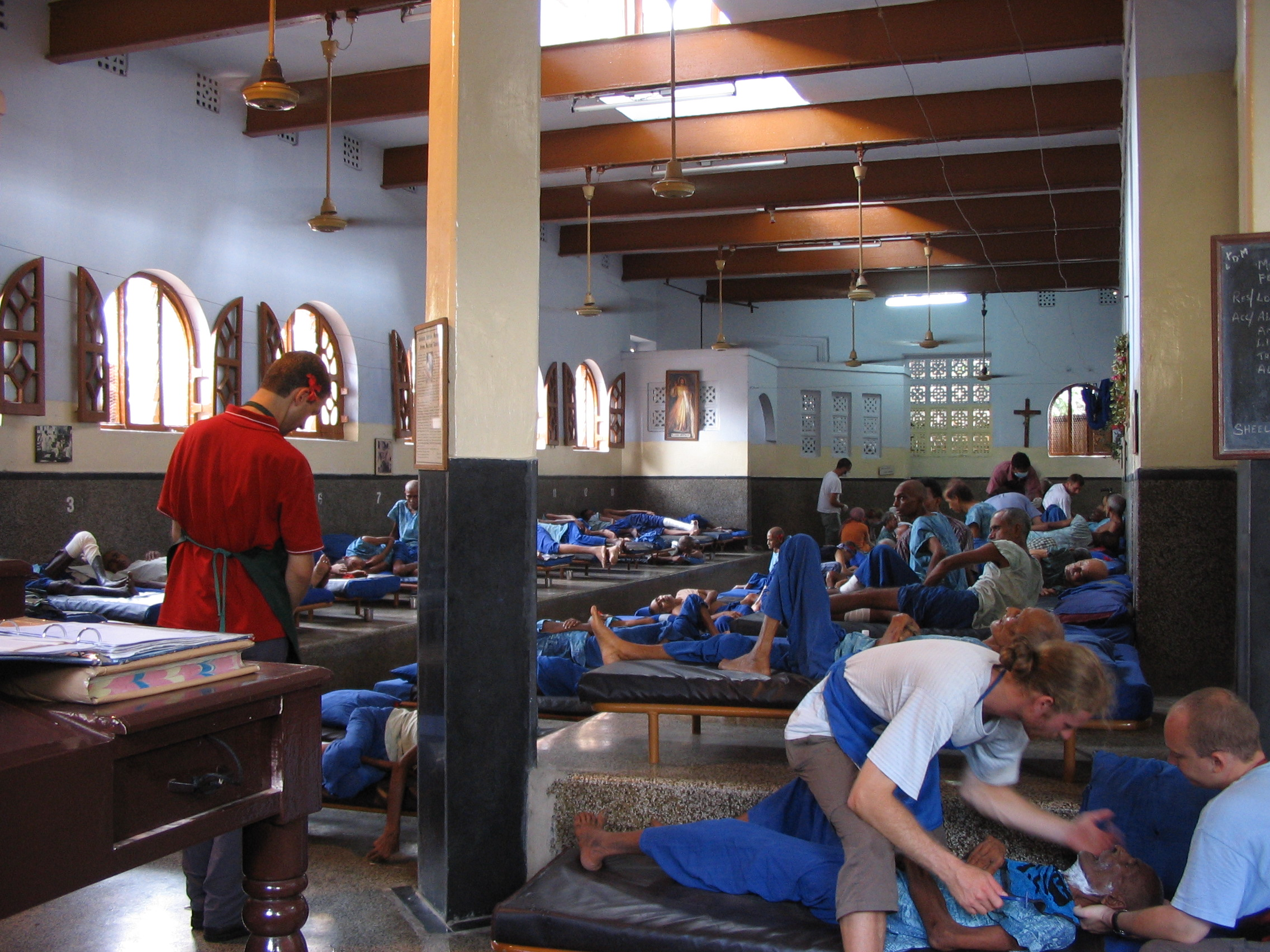
Men's ward at Kalighat, Home of the Pure Heart, Nirmal Hriday.

St. Mother Teresa opened the free hospice in 1952, next to the famous Kalighat Kali Temple in Kalighat Calcutta. With the help of Indian officials, she changed an abandoned building into the "Kalighat home for the dying", a free hospice for the poor. She later changed the name to "Kalighat the Home of the Pure Heart (Nirmal Hriday)". People who were brought to the home received medical attention from the Missionaries of Charity and were given the opportunity to die with dignity, according to the rituals of their respective faiths; Muslims were read the Qur’an, Hindus received Ganges Water, and Catholics received the Last Rites. "A beautiful death," she said, "is for people who lived like animals to die like angels—loved and wanted."

== Quality of medical care ==
In 1994, Robin Fox, then editor of the British medical journal The Lancet, visited the Home for Dying Destitutes in Calcutta (now Kolkata) and described the medical care the patients received as "haphazard". He observed that sisters and volunteers, some of whom had no medical knowledge, frequently made decisions about patient care because of the lack of doctors in the hospice: "There are doctors that call in from time to time," Fox wrote, "but usually the sisters and volunteers (some of whom have medical knowledge) make decisions as best they can." Fox witnessed one patient with high fever being treated with paracetamol and tetracycline, an antibiotic, only to be diagnosed later with malaria by a visiting doctor, who prescribed chloroquine. Fox specifically blamed Mother Teresa for these conditions, writing, "Mother Theresa prefers providence to planning". Fox also observed that staff either declined to use or lacked access to blood films or "simple algorithms that might help the sisters distinguish" between curable and incurable patients: "Investigations, I was told, are seldom permissible".

Fox conceded that the regimen he observed included "cleanliness, the tending of wounds and sores, and loving kindness", but critiqued the sisters' "spiritual approach" to managing pain: "I was disturbed to learn that the formulary includes no strong analgesics. Along with the neglect of diagnosis, the lack of good analgesia marks Mother Theresa's approach as clearly separate from the hospice movement. I know which I prefer."

Mary Loudon, who volunteered at the same facility, observed "syringes run under cold water and reused, aspirin given to those with terminal cancer, and cold baths given to everyone" as well as overcrowding. Loudon also recalled speaking with a visiting doctor whose fifteen-year-old patient was dying because the sisters had not given him antibiotics for a "relatively simple kidney complaint", and refused to transfer him to a nearby hospital for a needed operation.

There have been a series of other reports documenting inattention to medical care in the order's facilities. Similar points of view have also been expressed by some former volunteers who worked for Teresa's order. Mother Teresa herself referred to the facilities as "Houses of the Dying".

In 2013, a group of Université de Montréal academics joined the foregoing criticism, targeting, among other issues, the missionary's practice of "caring for the sick by glorifying their suffering instead of relieving it [...] her questionable political contacts, her suspicious management of the enormous sums of money she received, and her overly dogmatic views regarding, in particular, abortion, contraception, and divorce". Questioning the Vatican's motivations for ignoring the mass of criticism, the study concluded that Mother Teresa's "hallowed image – which does not stand up to analysis of the facts – was constructed, and that her beatification was orchestrated by an effective media relations campaign" engineered by the Catholic convert and anti-abortion BBC journalist Malcolm Muggeridge.

== Baptisms of the dying ==
Mother Teresa encouraged members of her order to baptize dying patients, without regard to the individual's religion. In a speech at the Scripps Clinic in California in January 1992, she said: "Something very beautiful... not one has died without receiving the special ticket for St. Peter, as we call it. We call baptism ticket for St. Peter. We ask the person, do you want a blessing by which your sins will be forgiven and you receive God? They have never refused. So 29,000 have died in that one house [in Kalighat] from the time we began in 1952."

Critics have argued that patients were not provided sufficient information to make an informed decision about whether they wanted to be baptized and the theological significance of a Christian baptism.

Some of Mother Teresa's defenders have argued that baptisms are either soul-saving or harmless and hence the criticisms would be pointless (a variant of Pascal's Wager). Simon Leys, in a letter to The New York Review of Books, wrote: "Either you believe in the supernatural effect of this gesture – and then you should dearly wish for it. Or you do not believe in it, and the gesture is as innocent and well-meaningly innocuous as chasing a fly away with a wave of the hand."
