= Something Beautiful for God =

1971 book by Malcolm Muggeridge

- Author: Malcolm Muggeridge
- Language: English
- Publisher: HarperCollins
- Publication date: 1971
- ISBN: 978-0002157698

Something Beautiful for God is a 1971 book by Malcolm Muggeridge on Mother Teresa. The book was based on a 1969 BBC documentary on Mother Teresa (also entitled Something Beautiful for God) that Muggeridge had undertaken.

Muggeridge was a former communist who became disillusioned in the 1930s, after reporting on the Holodomor in Ukraine for The Guardian. In the 1960s, when researching the work of Mother Teresa's order of nuns in Calcutta's House of the Dying, he experienced a religious conversion which eventually led him to enter the Catholic Church in 1982.

The book was first published by HarperCollins (ISBN 978-0002157698).

== Criticism ==
In his book, The Missionary Position: Mother Teresa in Theory and Practice, Christopher Hitchens critiqued Muggeridge's account of a "divine light" miracle which he had claimed to have witnessed in Calcutta's House of the Dying. On viewing footage of the film Something Beautiful for God, Muggeridge had attributed the clarity of the images to Teresa's "divine light". Hitchens considered that Muggeridge's interpretation of the phenomenon and the consequent publicity had contributed to Mother Teresa's international reputation as a holy figure.
