= Brian Kolodiejchuk =

Catholic priest and advocate for the canonization of Mother Teresa

Brian Kolodiejchuk, MC is a Canadian Catholic priest who served as the advocate for Mother Teresa of Calcutta in the cause for her canonization, and director of the Mother Teresa Center.

He edited and wrote the commentary for the book Mother Teresa: Come Be My Light, published by Doubleday, on September 4, 2007.

== Biography ==
=== Career ===
Father Kolodiejchuk's 20-year association with Mother Teresa began in 1977 when he joined a new group of contemplative brothers she was then starting. He later joined the priestly branch of Mother Teresa's religious family, the Missionaries of Charity Fathers, at the time of their foundation in 1984. He was ordained to the priesthood in June 1985 in the Ukrainian Catholic Church of St. John the Baptist in Newark, New Jersey, USA, by the late Metropolitan-Archbishop of Winnipeg, Maxim Hermaniuk, C.Ss.R. In March 1999 he served as Mother Teresa's advocate in advancing the cause of her beatification and canonization. He was appointed director of the Mother Teresa Center.

== Books ==
- Mother Teresa: Come Be My Light (editor), Doubleday, 2007 ISBN 978-0-385-52037-9
