= Celeste van Exem =

Belgian Jesuit priest

Celeste van Exem (4 October 1908 - 20 September 1993) was a Belgian Jesuit priest who lived in Calcutta from 1944 until his death there in 1993. Van Exem was a graduate of Louvain University, Belgium, and studied in Syria and Egypt.

== Life ==
After moving to India in 1938, the initial intent for his mission was to work closely with Indian Muslims, aided by his proficiency in Arabic and knowledge of Islam. However, shortly after his arrival in India, he met Mother Teresa at Loreto School in Calcutta's Entally suburb, where she was stationed. Van Exem became a major influence on the formation and running of the Missionaries of Charity organisation, and continued to advise Mother Teresa until his death.

In her later years, Mother Teresa wrote many letters to Van Exem, describing the progress of the newly founded Religious institute of the Missionaries of Charity and their charitable activities, as well as her personal struggles and spiritual doubts. These letters are possibly "the only sources that will shed light on Mother Teresa's inner life, struggles and strengths and also on her earlier companions."
