= Teresa, la Obra en Musical =

2004 Argentinian musical

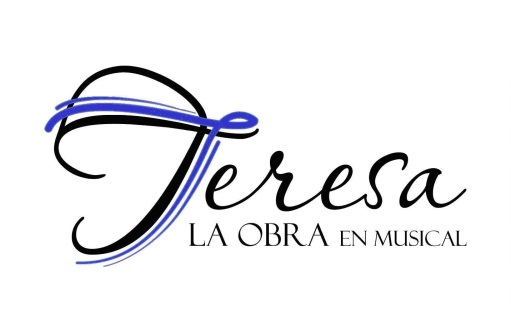
- Music: Juan Manuel Bevacqua
- Book: Julián Collados
- Basis: Life of Mother Teresa
- Premiere: December 2004: Lola Membrives Theater, Buenos Aires

Teresa, la Obra en Musical is an Argentinian musical based on the life of Mother Teresa of Calcutta. The show's book is by Julián Collados, with music by Juan Manuel Bevacqua, based on an idea by Tito Gabriel. Vicky Buchino starred as the titular protagonist. The show primarily covers about 30 years of Mother Teresa's life, from the late 1940s until 1979.

== Production ==
Teresa, la Obra en Musical premiered in December 2004 at the Lola Membrives Theater in Buenos Aires. The librettist, Julián Collados, also directed. The show was choreographed by Laura Scorza, with set design by Juan Pablo Villasante. The production had 25 actors. Later productions had larger casts of around 30 people. In 2005 it had a 5-month run at the Teatro La Comedia. In 2006, it had ten performances in Santiago, Chile.

Productions have also been held in San Fernando, San Isidro, Formosa Province in 2007 at the Youth Amphitheater, and in La Plata, where it was performed in front of the Cathedral for its founding anniversary.

The show was presented on October 26, 2008 as part of the Spring Buenos Aires program, in the Amphitheater of the Costanera Sur (Puerto Madero). This performance coincided with the 30-year celebration of the beginning of the Pontificate of John Paul II, and the fifth anniversary of the Beatification of Mother Teresa of Calcutta. Approximately 2,000 people attended.

In April 2009 a production was held at Teatro 25 de Mayo in Buenos Aires.

The show was revived in September 2019 in Belgrano, Buenos Aires, in honor of the show's 15th anniversary.

== Plot ==
=== Act I ===
The work begins with the funeral of Princess Diana and the death of Mother Teresa, drawing a comparison between the two and establishing the Paparazzi as a character and narrator. The show then flashes back to Teresa's baptism and then to Teresa's entrance into religious life with the Sisters of Loreto and farewell to her mother. Teresa arrives in Calcutta and begins her work with the Sisters. She is transferred to Darjeeling, and begins working as a missionary of charity. The congregation in Kalighat grows, and new conflicts arise. A young Hindu priest who wants to evict the congregation is converted to Christianity. The outside world learns more about Teresa, and is confused about her motives and message. She is invited to a TV interview, where she talks poverty of the heart. The act ends with Teresa and her congregants proposing their message: "Grow in love".

=== Act II ===
The second act opens with a division between the Paparazzi, who hoard power and compete with the poor, and Teresa. The next scene shows daily life in the Calcutta house, and explains some of its history. Teresa opens a cooperative association. This is disrupted by the entrance of foreign missions in India. The press, in the form of the Paparazzi, harass Teresa. In response, she closes the cooperative association. The show ends with the Paparazzi reflecting and converting. He and Teresa sing together before she is awarded the Nobel Peace Prize and gives a speech.

== Cast ==
Role	2004 Buenos Aires	2019 Buenos Aires
Teresa	Vicky Buchino	Vicky Buchino
Paparazzi	Juan Skreltkowicz	Chacho Garabal

== Songs ==
- Por tu amor
- Para crecer en el amor
- Sabré la verdad

== Reception ==
El Muro criticized the work for its depiction of poverty, saying it used the poor and sick more as props than as fully realized characters, and because it "does not leave room to think that there should not be poor people". They did, however, enjoy the performances of Buchino, Skreltkowicz, and the ensemble.
