= Mother Teresa =

Albanian-Indian Catholic saint (1910–1997)

Saint Teresa of Calcutta MC
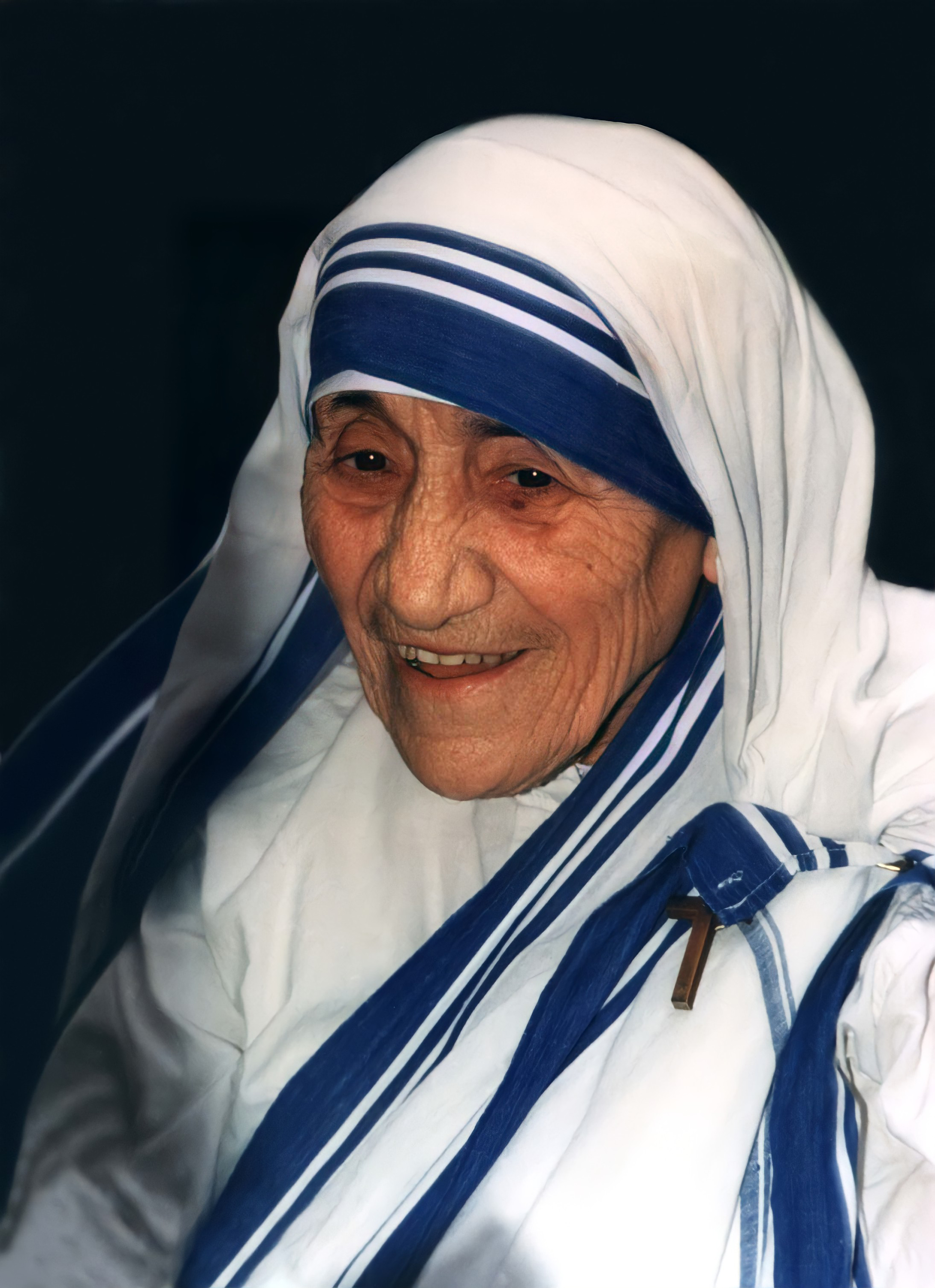
- Mother Teresa, photographed by John Mathew Smith in 1995

Virgin
- Born: Anjezë Gonxhe Bojaxhiu; 26 August 1910; Üsküp, Kosovo vilayet, Ottoman Empire
- Died: 5 September 1997 (aged 87); Calcutta, West Bengal, India
- Venerated in: Catholic Church
- Beatified: 19 October 2003, Saint Peter's Square, Vatican City by Pope John Paul II
- Canonized: 4 September 2016, Saint Peter's Square, Vatican City by Pope Francis
- Major shrine: Mother House of the Missionaries of Charity, Calcutta, West Bengal, India
- Feast: 5 September
- Attributes: Religious habit Rosary
- Patronage: World Youth Day; Missionaries of Charity; Archdiocese of Calcutta (co-patron)
- Title: Superior general

Personal life

Religious life
- Denomination: Catholic Church
- Institute: Sisters of Loreto (1928–1948); Missionaries of Charity (1950–1997)

Senior posting
- Period in office: 1950–1997
- Successor: Nirmala Joshi

Anjezë Gonxhe Bojaxhiu (Albanian: [aˈɲɛzə ˈɡɔndʒɛ bɔjaˈdʒi.u]; 26 August 1910 – 5 September 1997), better known as Mother Teresa or Saint Mother Teresa of Calcutta, (Note: Albanian: Nënë Tereza; Bengali: মাদার টেরিজা, romanized: Mādāra Ṭērijā, or মাদার তেরেসা, Mādāra Tērēsā.) was an Albanian-Indian Catholic nun, founder of the Missionaries of Charity and a Catholic saint.

Born in Skopje, then part of the Ottoman Empire, (Note: After World War I and the dissolution of the Ottoman Empire, Skopje became part of the Kingdom of Serbs, Croats and Slovenes, for the duration of Teresa's childhood. Since the 1990s, Skopje has been the capital of North Macedonia.) she was raised in a devoutly Catholic family. At the age of 18, she moved to Ireland to join the Sisters of Loreto and later to India, where she lived most of her life and carried out her missionary work. On 4 September 2016, she was canonised by the Catholic Church as Saint Teresa of Calcutta. The anniversary of her death, 5 September, is now observed as her feast day.

In 1950, Mother Teresa established the Missionaries of Charity, a religious congregation that was initially dedicated to serving "the poorest of the poor" in the slums of Calcutta. Over the decades, the congregation grew to operate in over 133 countries, as of 2012, with more than 4,500 nuns managing homes for those dying from HIV/AIDS, leprosy, and tuberculosis, as well as running soup kitchens, dispensaries, mobile clinics, orphanages, and schools. Members of the order take vows of chastity, poverty, and obedience and also profess a fourth vow: to give "wholehearted free service to the poorest of the poor."

Mother Teresa received several honours, including the 1962 Ramon Magsaysay Peace Prize and the 1979 Nobel Peace Prize. However, she also drew criticism for the poor conditions and lack of medical care or pain relief in her houses for the dying. Her life and work have inspired books, documentaries, and films. Her authorized biography, written by Navin Chawla, was published in 1992, and on 6 September 2017, she was named a co-patron of the Roman Catholic Archdiocese of Calcutta alongside St Francis Xavier.

== Biography ==
=== Early life and family ===
Mother Teresa's given name was Anjezë Gonxhe (or Gonxha) Bojaxhiu (Anjezë is a cognate of Agnes; Gonxhe means "flower bud" in Albanian). She was born on 26 August 1910 into a Kosovar Albanian family in Skopje, then part of the Ottoman Empire (now the capital of North Macedonia). She was baptised in Skopje the day after her birth. She later considered 27 August, the day she was baptised, her "true birthday".

She was the youngest child of Nikollë and Dranafile Bojaxhiu (Bernai). Her father, who was involved in Albanian-community politics in Ottoman Macedonia, was probably poisoned, an act attributed to Serbian agents, after he had visited Belgrade for a political meeting in 1919 when she was eight years old. (Note: Although some sources state she was 10 when her father died, in an interview with her brother, the Vatican documents her age at the time as "about eight".) He was born in Prizren (today in Kosovo), however, his family was from Mirdita (present-day Albania). Her mother may have been from a village near Gjakova, believed by her offspring to be Bishtazhin.

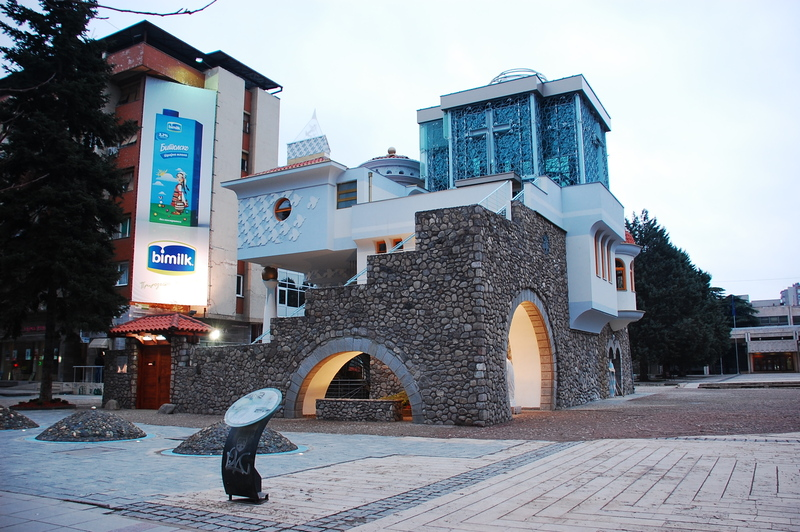
Memorial House of Mother Teresa in her native Skopje

According to a biography by Joan Graff Clucas, Anjezë was in her early years when she became fascinated by stories of the lives of missionaries and their service in Bengal; by age 12, she was convinced that she should commit herself to religious life. Her resolve strengthened on 15 August 1928 as she prayed at the shrine of the Black Madonna of Vitina-Letnice, where she often went on pilgrimages. Anjezë left home in 1928 at age 18 to join the Sisters of Loreto at Loreto Abbey in Rathfarnham, Ireland, to learn English with the intent of becoming a missionary; English was the language of instruction of the Sisters of Loreto in India. She saw neither her mother nor her sister again. Her family lived in Skopje until 1934, when they moved to Tirana. During communist leader Enver Hoxha's rule, she was considered a dangerous agent of the Vatican. Despite multiple requests and despite the fact that many countries made requests on her behalf, she was denied a chance to see her family and was not granted the opportunity to see her mother and sister. Both of them died during Hoxha's rule, and Anjezë herself was only able to visit Albania after the communist regime collapsed in 1991. Dom Lush Gjergji in his book "Our Mother Teresa" describes one of her trips to the embassy where she was crying as she was leaving the building, saying:

Dear God, I can understand and accept that I should suffer, but it is so hard to understand and accept why my mother has to suffer. In her old age she has no other wish than to see us one last time.

She arrived in India in 1929 and began her novitiate in Darjeeling, in the lower Himalayas, where she learned Bengali and taught at St. Teresa's School near her convent. She took her first religious vows on 24 May 1931. She chose to be named after Thérèse de Lisieux, the patron saint of missionaries; because a nun in the convent had already chosen that name, she opted for its Spanish spelling of Teresa.

Teresa took her solemn vows on 14 May 1937 while she was a teacher at the Loreto convent school in Entally, eastern Calcutta, taking the style of 'Mother' as part of Loreto custom. She served there for nearly twenty years and was appointed its headmistress in 1944. Although Mother Teresa enjoyed teaching at the school, she was increasingly disturbed by the poverty surrounding her in Calcutta. The Bengal famine of 1943 brought misery and death to the city, and the August 1946 Direct Action Day began a period of Muslim-Hindu violence.

In 1946, during a visit to Darjeeling by train, Mother Teresa felt that she heard the call of her inner conscience to serve the poor of India for Jesus. She asked for and received permission to leave the school. In 1950, she founded the Missionaries of Charity, choosing a white sari with two blue borders as the order's habit.

=== Missionaries of Charity ===
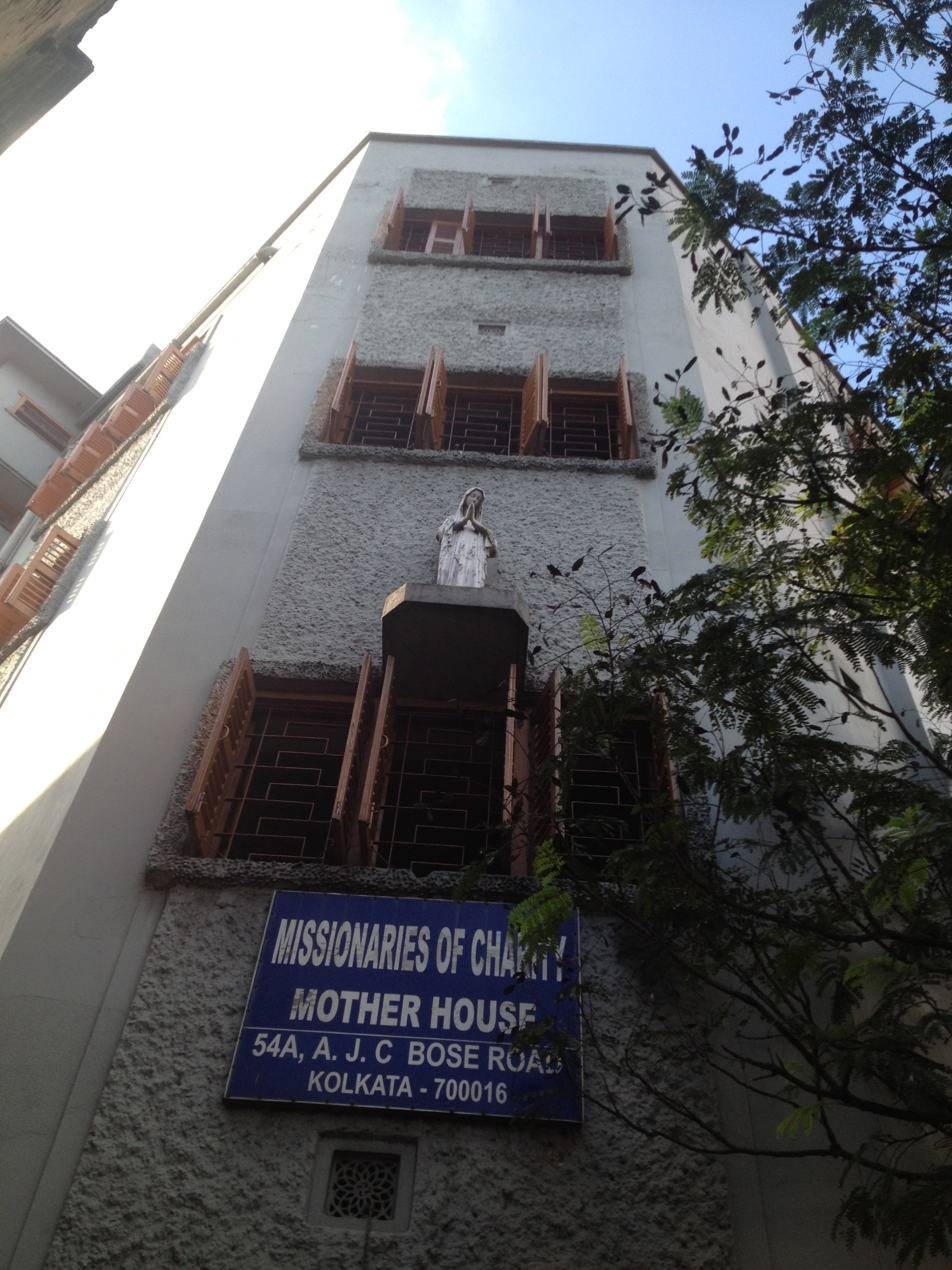
Missionaries of Charity motherhouse in Calcutta

On 10 September 1946, Teresa experienced what she later described as "the call within the call" when she travelled by train to the Loreto convent in Darjeeling from Calcutta for her annual retreat. "I was to leave the convent and help the poor while living among them. It was an order. To fail would have been to break the faith." Joseph Langford, MC, founder of her congregation of priests, the Missionaries of Charity Fathers, later wrote, "Though no one knew it at the time, Sister Teresa had just become Mother Teresa".

She began missionary work with the poor in 1948, replacing her traditional Loreto habit with a simple, white cotton sari with a blue border. Mother Teresa adopted Indian citizenship, spent several months in Patna to receive basic medical training at Holy Family Hospital and ventured into the slums. She founded a school in Motijhil, Calcutta, before she began tending to the poor and hungry.

Her efforts quickly caught the attention of Indian officials, including the prime minister. Mother Teresa wrote in her diary that her first year was fraught with difficulty. With no income, she begged for food and supplies and experienced doubt, loneliness and the temptation to return to the comfort of convent life during these early months:

Our Lord wants me to be a free nun covered with the poverty of the cross. Today, I learned a good lesson. The poverty of the poor must be so hard for them. While looking for a home I walked and walked till my arms and legs ached. I thought how much they must ache in body and soul, looking for a home, food and health. Then, the comfort of Loreto [her former congregation] came to tempt me. "You have only to say the word and all that will be yours again", the Tempter kept on saying. ... Of free choice, my God, and out of love for you, I desire to remain and do whatever be your Holy will in my regard. I did not let a single tear come.

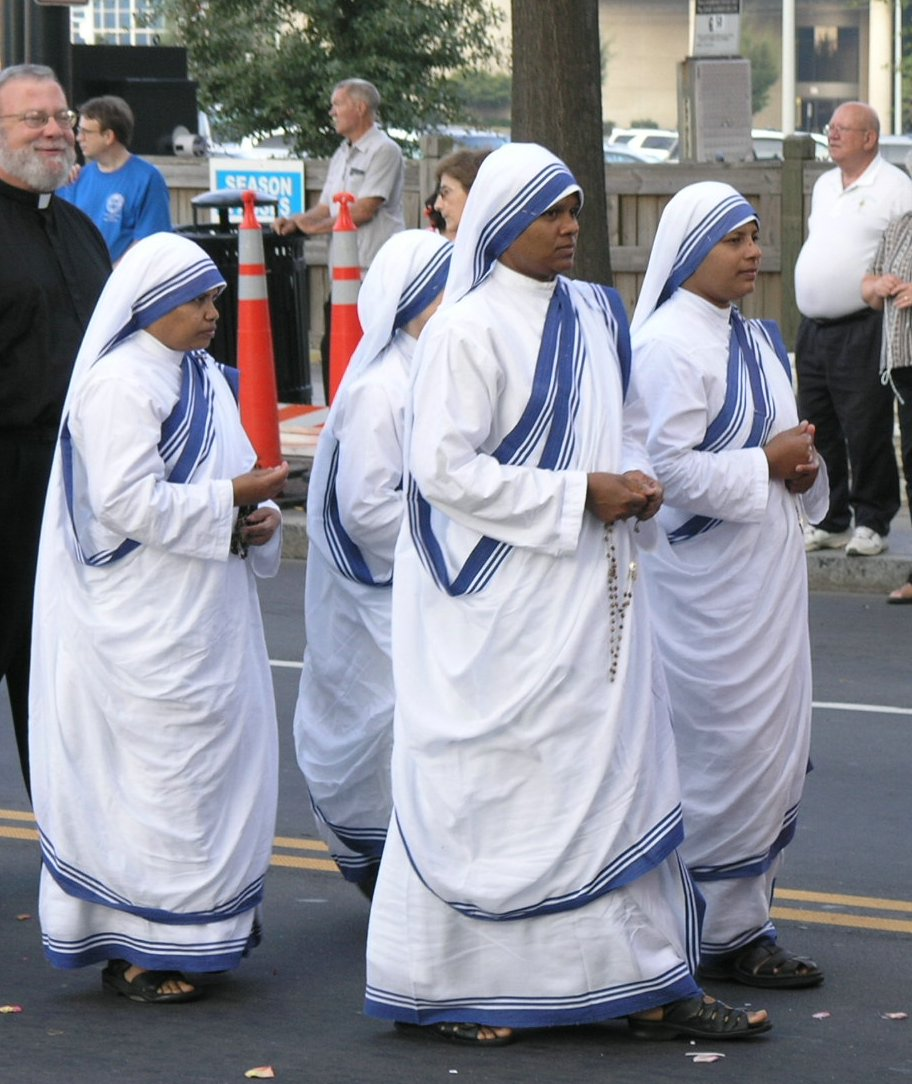
Missionaries of Charity in traditional saris

On 7 October 1950, Mother Teresa received Vatican permission for the diocesan congregation, which would become the Missionaries of Charity. In her words, it would care for "the hungry, the naked, the homeless, the crippled, the blind, the lepers, all those people who feel unwanted, unloved, uncared for throughout society, people that have become a burden to the society and are shunned by everyone".

In 1952, Mother Teresa opened her first hospice with help from Calcutta officials. She converted an abandoned Hindu temple into the Kalighat Home for the Dying, free for the poor, and renamed it Kalighat, the Home of the Pure Heart (Nirmal Hriday). Those brought to the home received medical attention and the opportunity to die with dignity in accordance with their faith: Muslims were to read the Quran, Hindus received water from the Ganges, and Catholics received extreme unction. "A beautiful death", Mother Teresa said, "is for people who lived like animals to die like angels—loved and wanted."

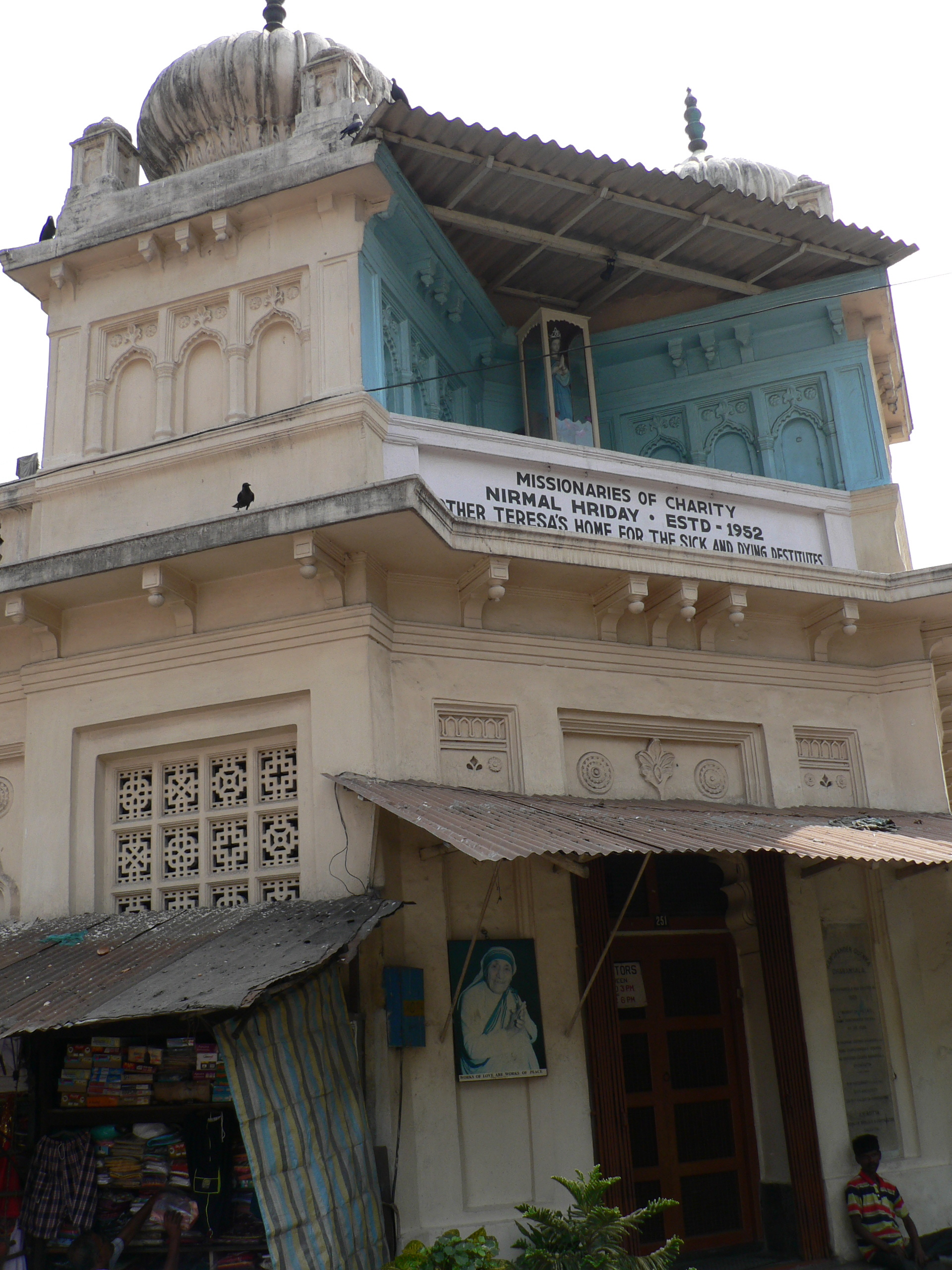
Nirmal Hriday, Mother Teresa's Calcutta hospice, in 2007

She opened a hospice for those with leprosy, calling it Shanti Nagar (City of Peace). The Missionaries of Charity established leprosy-outreach clinics throughout Calcutta, providing medication, dressings and food. The Missionaries of Charity took in an increasing number of homeless children; in 1955, Mother Teresa opened Nirmala Shishu Bhavan, the Children's Home of the Immaculate Heart, as a haven for orphans and homeless youth.

The congregation began to attract recruits and donations, and by the 1960s it had opened hospices, orphanages and leper houses throughout India. Mother Teresa then expanded the congregation abroad, opening a house in Venezuela in 1965 with five sisters. Houses followed in Italy (Rome), Tanzania and Austria in 1968, and, during the 1970s, the congregation opened houses and foundations in the United States and dozens of countries in Asia, Africa and Europe.

The Missionaries of Charity Brothers was founded in 1963, and a contemplative branch of the Sisters followed in 1976. Lay Catholics and non-Catholics were enrolled in the Co-Workers of Mother Teresa, the Sick and Suffering Co-Workers, and the Lay Missionaries of Charity. Responding to requests by many priests, in 1981, Mother Teresa founded the Corpus Christi Movement for Priests and with Joseph Langford founded the Missionaries of Charity Fathers in 1984 to combine the vocational aims of the Missionaries of Charity with the resources of the priesthood.

By 1997, the 13-member Calcutta congregation had grown to more than 4,000 sisters who managed orphanages, AIDS hospices and charity centres worldwide, caring for refugees, the blind, the disabled, the aged, alcoholics, the poor and homeless and victims of floods, epidemics and famine. By 2007, the Missionaries of Charity numbered about 450 brothers and 5,000 sisters worldwide, operating 600 missions, schools and shelters in 120 countries.

However, this growth did not come without its criticism. According to a paper by Canadian academics Serge Larivée, Geneviève Chénard and Carole Sénéchal, Mother Teresa's clinics received millions of dollars in donations but lacked medical care, systematic diagnosis, necessary nutrition, and sufficient analgesics for those in pain.

In the opinion of the three academics, "Mother Teresa believed the sick must suffer like Christ on the cross". It was said that the additional money might have transformed the health of the city's poor by creating advanced palliative care facilities.

One of Mother Teresa's most outspoken critics was English journalist and one of the leaders of New Atheism Christopher Hitchens, who wrote in a 2003 article:

This returns us to the medieval corruption of the church, which sold indulgences to the rich while preaching hellfire and continence to the poor. [Mother Teresa] was not a friend of the poor. She was a friend of poverty. She said that suffering was a gift from God. She spent her life opposing the only known cure for poverty, which is the empowerment of women and the emancipation of them from a livestock version of compulsory reproduction.

=== International charity ===
Mother Teresa said, "By blood, I am Albanian. By citizenship, an Indian. By faith, I am a Catholic nun. As to my calling, I belong to the world. As to my heart, I belong entirely to the Heart of Jesus."

Fluent in five languages – Bengali, Albanian, Serbo-Croatian, English and Hindi – she made occasional trips outside India for humanitarian reasons. These included, in 1971, a visit with four of her sisters, to Troubles-era Belfast. Her suggestion that the conditions she had found justified an ongoing mission was the cause of some embarrassment. Reportedly under pressure from senior clergy, who believed "the missionary traffic should be in other direction", and despite local welcome and support, she and her sisters abruptly left the city in 1973.

At the height of the Siege of Beirut in 1982, Mother Teresa rescued 37 children trapped in a front-line hospital by brokering a temporary cease-fire between the Israeli army and Palestinian guerrillas. Accompanied by Red Cross workers, she travelled through the war zone to the hospital to evacuate the young patients.

When Eastern Europe experienced increased openness in the late 1980s, Mother Teresa expanded her efforts to Communist countries which had rejected the Missionaries of Charity. She began dozens of projects, undeterred by criticism of her stands against abortion and divorce: "No matter who says what, you should accept it with a smile and do your own work". She visited Armenia after the 1988 earthquake and met with Soviet Premier Nikolai Ryzhkov.

Abortion-rights groups did criticize Mother Teresa's stance against abortion and contraception. Mother Teresa promoted the Catholic moral rejection of all abortion and contraception. She singled out abortion as "the greatest destroyer of peace today. Because if a mother can kill her own child – what is left for me to kill you and you kill me – there is nothing between." At the Fourth World Conference on Women in Beijing, Mother Teresa said: "[W]e can destroy this gift of motherhood, especially by the evil of abortion, but also by thinking that other things like jobs or positions are more important than loving."

Mother Teresa travelled to assist the hungry in Ethiopia, radiation victims at Chernobyl and earthquake victims in Armenia. In 1991 she returned to Albania for the first time, opening a Missionaries of Charity Brothers home in Tirana.

By 1996, the Missionaries of Charity operated 517 missions in over 100 countries. The number of sisters in the Missionaries of Charity grew from twelve to thousands, serving the "poorest of the poor" in 450 centres worldwide. The first Missionaries of Charity home in the United States was established in the South Bronx area of New York City, and by 1984 the congregation operated 19 establishments throughout the country.

=== Declining health and death ===
Mother Teresa had a heart attack in Rome in 1983 while she was visiting Pope John Paul II. Following a second attack in 1989, she received a pacemaker. In 1991, after a bout of pneumonia in Mexico, she had additional heart problems. Although Mother Teresa offered to resign as head of the Missionaries of Charity, in a secret ballot the sisters of the congregation voted for her to stay, and she agreed to continue.

In April 1996, Mother Teresa fell, breaking her collarbone, and four months later she had malaria and heart failure. Although she underwent heart surgery, her health was clearly declining. According to the Archbishop of Calcutta Henry Sebastian D'Souza, he ordered a priest to perform an exorcism (with her permission) when she was first hospitalised with cardiac problems because he thought she might be under attack by the devil. On 13 March 1997, Mother Teresa resigned as head of the Missionaries of Charity. She died on 5 September.

==== Reactions ====
Mother Teresa lay in repose in an open casket in St Thomas, Calcutta, for a week before her funeral. She received a state funeral from the Indian government in gratitude for her service to the poor of all religions in the country. Cardinal Secretary of State Angelo Sodano, the Pope's representative, delivered the homily at the service. Mother Teresa's death was mourned in the secular and religious communities. Prime Minister of Pakistan Nawaz Sharif called her "a rare and unique individual who lived long for higher purposes. Her lifelong devotion to the care of the poor, the sick, and the disadvantaged was one of the highest examples of service to our humanity." According to former U.N. Secretary-General Javier Pérez de Cuéllar, "She is the United Nations. She is peace in the world."

== Recognition and reception ==
=== India ===
From the Indian government, under the name of Mary Teresa Bojaxhiu, Mother Teresa was issued a diplomatic passport. She received the Padma Shri in 1962 and the Jawaharlal Nehru Award for International Understanding in 1969. She later received other Indian awards, including the Bharat Ratna (India's highest civilian award) in 1980. In 1991 the country's first modern University, Senate of Serampore College (University) awarded her an honorary Doctorate of Divinity during registrarship of D. S. Satyaranjan. Mother Teresa's official biography, by Navin Chawla, was published in 1992. In Calcutta, she is worshipped as a deity by some Hindus.

To commemorate the 100th anniversary of her birth, the government of India issued a special ₹5 coin (the amount of money Mother Teresa had when she arrived in India) on 28 August 2010. President Pratibha Patil said, "Clad in a white sari with a blue border, she and the sisters of Missionaries of Charity became a symbol of hope to many—namely, the aged, the destitute, the unemployed, the diseased, the terminally ill, and those abandoned by their families."

Indian views of Mother Teresa are not uniformly favourable. Aroup Chatterjee, a physician born and raised in Calcutta who was an activist in the city's slums for years around 1980 before moving to the UK, said that he "never even saw any nuns in those slums". His research, involving more than 100 interviews with volunteers, nuns and others familiar with the Missionaries of Charity, was described in a 2003 book critical of Mother Teresa. Chatterjee criticized her for promoting a "cult of suffering" and a distorted, negative image of Calcutta, exaggerating work done by her mission and misusing funds and privileges at her disposal. According to him, some of the hygiene problems he had criticized (such as the reuse of needles) improved after Mother Teresa's death in 1997.

Bikash Ranjan Bhattacharya, mayor of Calcutta from 2005 to 2010, said that "she had no significant impact on the poor of this city", glorified illness instead of treating it and misrepresented the city: "No doubt there was poverty in Calcutta, but it was never a city of lepers and beggars, as Mother Teresa presented it." On the Hindu right, the Bharatiya Janata Party clashed with Mother Teresa over the Christian Dalits but praised her in death and sent a representative to her funeral. Vishwa Hindu Parishad, however, opposed the government decision to grant her a state funeral. Secretary Giriraj Kishore said that "her first duty was to the Church and social service was incidental", accusing her of favouring Christians and conducting "secret baptisms" of the dying. In a front-page tribute, the Indian fortnightly Frontline dismissed the charges as "patently false" and said that they had "made no impact on the public perception of her work, especially in Calcutta". Praising her "selfless caring", energy and bravery, the author of the tribute criticised Teresa's public campaign against abortion and her claim to be non-political.

In February 2015 Mohan Bhagwat, leader of the Hindu right-wing organisation Rashtriya Swayamsevak Sangh, said that Mother Teresa's objective was "to convert the person, who was being served, into a Christian". Former RSS spokesperson M. G. Vaidhya supported Bhagwat's assessment, and the organisation accused the media of "distorting facts about Bhagwat's remarks". Trinamool Congress MP Derek O'Brien, CPI leader Atul Anjan and Delhi chief minister Arvind Kejriwal protested Bhagwat's statement.

=== Elsewhere ===
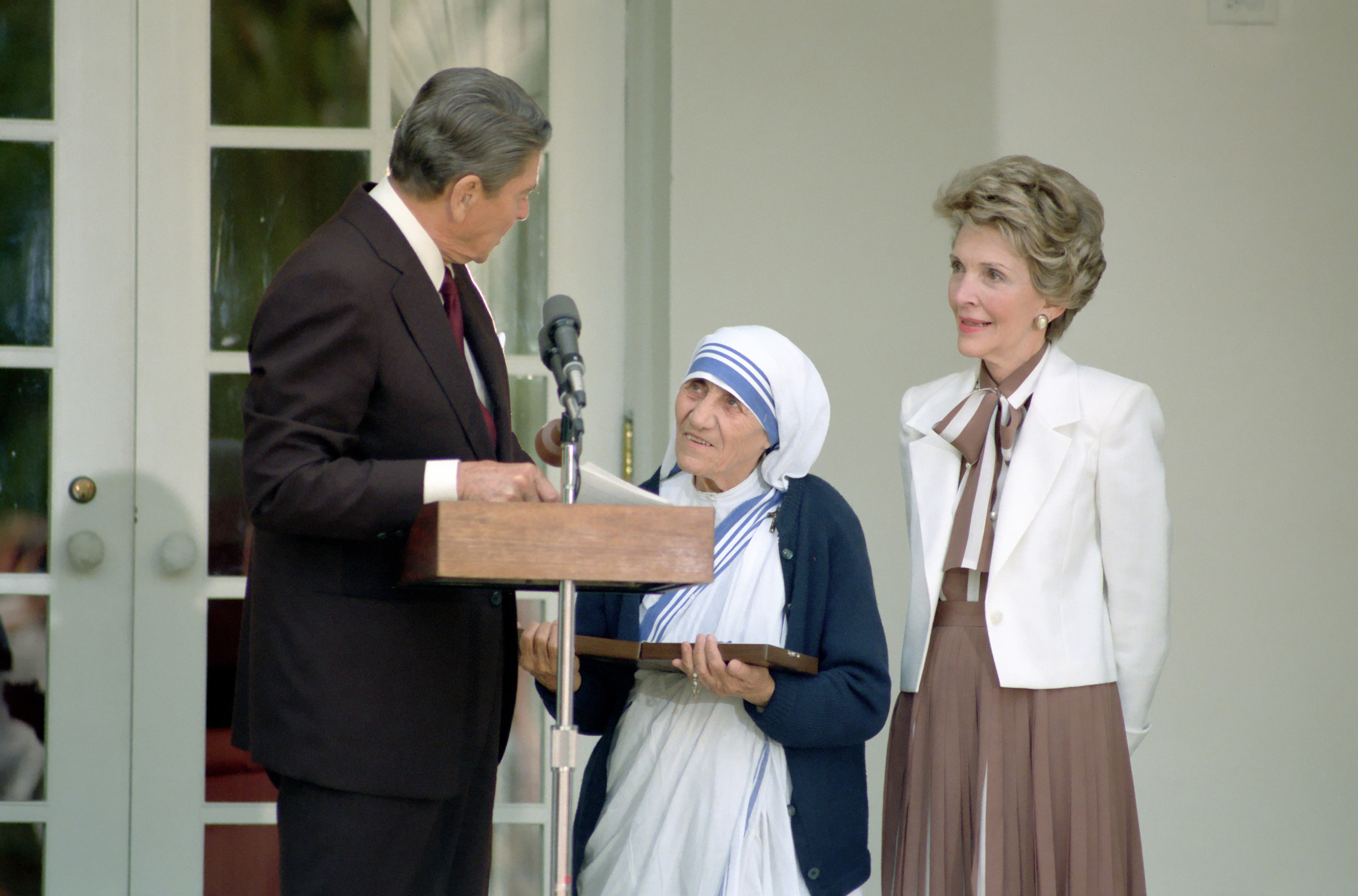
President Ronald Reagan presents Mother Teresa with the Presidential Medal of Freedom at a White House ceremony as First Lady Nancy Reagan looks on, 20 June 1985.

Mother Teresa received the Ramon Magsaysay Award for Peace and International Understanding, given for work in South or East Asia, in 1962. According to its citation, "The Board of Trustees recognises her merciful cognisance of the abject poor of a foreign land, in whose service she has led a new congregation". By the early 1970s, Mother Teresa was an international celebrity. She had been catapulted to fame via Malcolm Muggeridge's 1969 BBC documentary, Something Beautiful for God, before he released a 1971 book of the same name. Muggeridge was undergoing a spiritual journey of his own at the time. During filming, footage shot in poor lighting (particularly at the Home for the Dying) was thought unlikely to be usable by the crew; the crew had been using new, untested photographic film. In England, the footage was found to be extremely well-lit and Muggeridge called it a miracle of "divine light" from Teresa. Other crew members said that it was due to a new type of ultra-sensitive Kodak film. Muggeridge later converted to Catholicism.

Around this time, the Catholic world began to honour Mother Teresa publicly. Pope Paul VI gave her the inaugural Pope John XXIII Peace Prize in 1971, commending her work with the poor, her display of Christian charity and her efforts for peace. She received the Pacem in Terris Award in 1976. After her death, Teresa progressed rapidly on the road to sainthood.

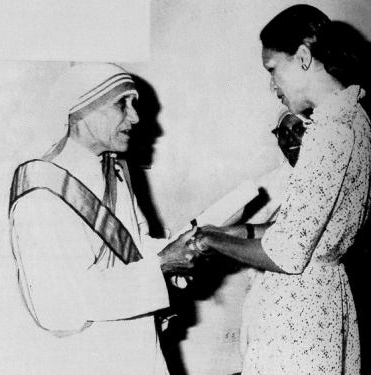
Mother Teresa with Michèle Duvalier in January 1981

She was honoured by governments and civilian organisations and appointed an honorary Companion of the Order of Australia in 1982 "for service to the community of Australia and humanity at large". The United Kingdom and the United States bestowed a number of awards, culminating in the Order of Merit in 1983 and honorary citizenship of the United States on 16 November 1996. Mother Teresa's Albanian homeland gave her the Golden Honour of the Nation in 1994, but her acceptance of this and the Haitian Legion of Honour was controversial. Mother Teresa was criticised for implicitly supporting the Duvaliers and corrupt businessmen such as Charles Keating and Robert Maxwell; she wrote to the judge of Keating's trial requesting clemency.

Universities in India and the West granted her honorary degrees. Other civilian awards included the Balzan Prize for promoting humanity, peace and brotherhood among peoples (1978) and the Albert Schweitzer International Prize (1975). In April 1976, Mother Teresa visited the University of Scranton in northeastern Pennsylvania, where she received the La Storta Medal for Human Service from university president William J. Byron. She challenged an audience of 4,500 to "know poor people in your own home and local neighbourhood", feeding others or simply spreading joy and love. Mother Teresa continued: "The poor will help us grow in sanctity, for they are Christ in the guise of distress". In August 1987, Mother Teresa received an honorary doctor of social science degree from the university in recognition of her service and her ministry to help the destitute and sick. She spoke to over 4,000 students and members of the Diocese of Scranton about her service to the "poorest of the poor", telling them to "do small things with great love".

During her lifetime, Mother Teresa was among the top 10 women in the annual Gallup's most admired man and woman poll 18 times, finishing first several times in the 1980s and 1990s. In 1999 she headed Gallup's List of Most Widely Admired People of the 20th Century, out-polling all other volunteered answers by a wide margin. She was first in all major demographic categories except the very young.

==== Nobel Peace Prize ====
External videos
- Mother Teresa's 1979 Nobel Peace Prize acceptance speech

In 1979, Mother Teresa received the Nobel Peace Prize "for work undertaken in the struggle to overcome poverty and distress, which also constitutes a threat to peace". She refused the conventional ceremonial banquet for laureates, asking that its $192,000 cost be given to the poor in India and saying that earthly rewards were important only if they helped her to help the world's needy. When Mother Teresa received the prize she was asked, "What can we do to promote world peace?" She answered, "Go home and love your family." Building on this theme in her Nobel lecture, she said: "Around the world, not only in the poor countries, but I found the poverty of the West so much more difficult to remove. When I pick up a person from the street, hungry, I give him a plate of rice, a piece of bread, I have satisfied. I have removed that hunger. But a person that is shut out, that feels unwanted, unloved, terrified, the person that has been thrown out from society – that poverty is so hurtable [sic] and so much, and I find that very difficult."

==== Defence of ministry ====
Criticism towards Mother Teresa has been challenged and rebutted by others. Her critics were accused by Simon Leys of directing attacks at her for simply being a Christian. Navin B. Chawla points out that Mother Teresa never intended to build hospitals, but to provide a place where those who had been refused admittance "could at least die being comforted and with some dignity." He also counters critics of Mother Teresa by stating that her periodic hospitalizations were instigated by staff members against her wishes and he disputes the claim that she conducted unethical conversions. "Those who are quick to criticise Mother Teresa and her mission, are unable or unwilling to do anything to help with their own hands."

Similarly, Sister Mary Prema Pierick, the former Superior General of the Missionaries of Charity, also stated that Mother Teresa's homes were never intended to be a substitute for hospitals, but rather "homes for those not accepted in the hospital... But if they need hospital care, then we have to take them to the hospital, and we do that." Sister Pierick also contested the claims that Mother Teresa deliberately cultivated suffering, and affirmed her order's goal was to alleviate suffering.

Fr. Des Wilson, who had hosted her in Belfast in 1971, argued that "Mother Theresa was content to pick up the sad pieces left by a vicious political and economic system" and he noted that hers was a fate very different to that of Archbishop Óscar Romero of El Salvador. While she got the Nobel Prize, "Romero, who attacked the causes of misery as well as picking up the pieces, was shot in the head".

==== Defence of priest accused of molestation ====
In 1994, Mother Teresa argued that the sexual abuse allegations against Jesuit priest Donald McGuire, her confessor, were untrue. She stated her "confidence and trust in Fr. McGuire" and pushed for him to be reinstated to the ministry. McGuire was reinstated, but in 2006 he was tried and convicted for sexually molesting multiple children in the 1960s. In 2009 he was convicted of further charges of molestation and sentenced to 25 years in prison. When Mother Teresa's defence of McGuire later came to light, it prompted substantial criticism.

== Spiritual life ==
Analysing her deeds and achievements, Pope John Paul II said: "Where did Mother Teresa find the strength and perseverance to place herself completely at the service of others? She found it in prayer and in the silent contemplation of Jesus Christ, his Holy Face, his Sacred Heart." Privately, Mother Teresa experienced doubts and struggle in her religious beliefs which lasted nearly 50 years, until the end of her life. Mother Teresa expressed grave doubts about God's existence and pain over her lack of faith:

Where is my faith? Even deep down [...] there is nothing but emptiness and darkness. [...] If there be God – please forgive me. When I try to raise my thoughts to Heaven, there is such convicting emptiness that those very thoughts return like sharp knives and hurt my very soul.

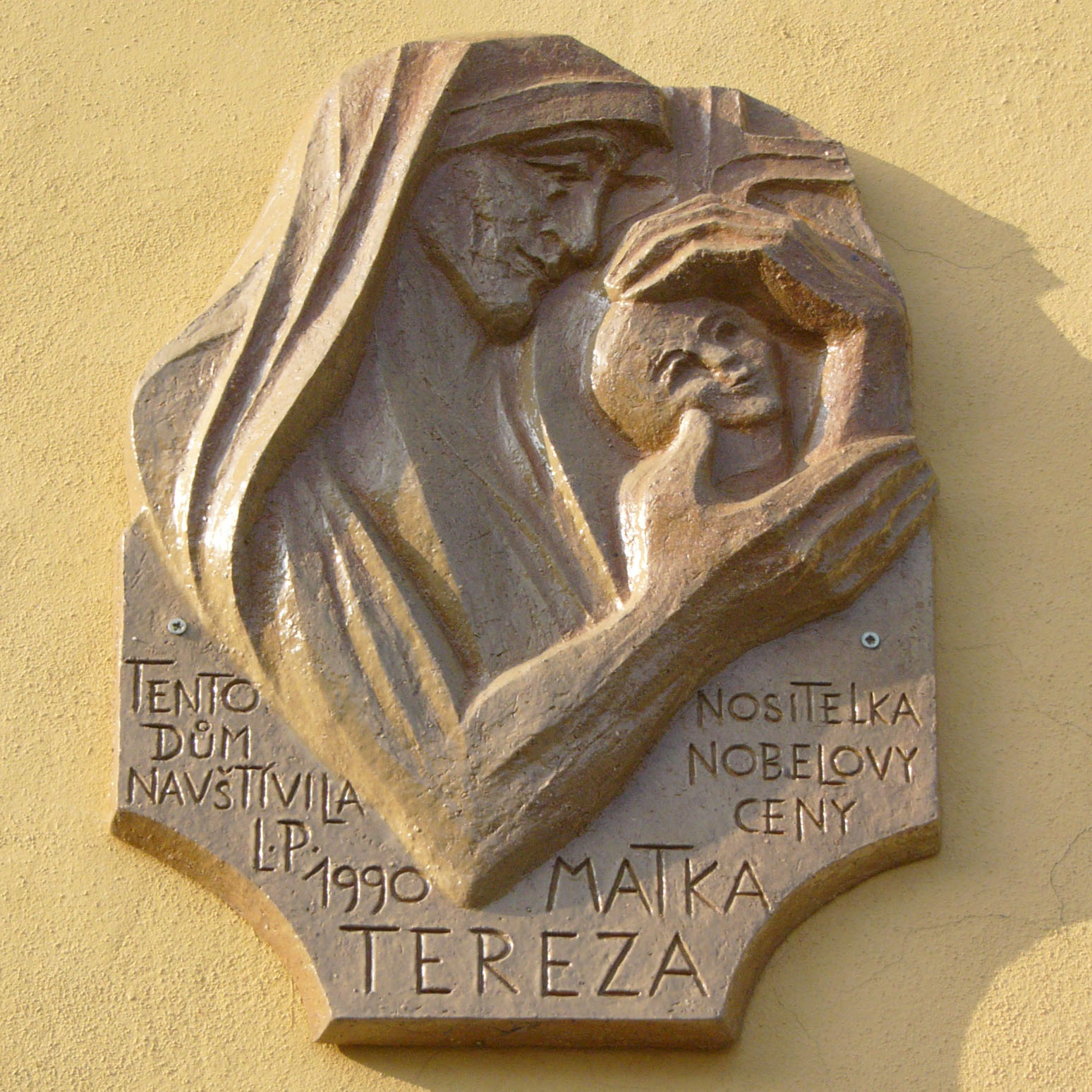
Plaque dedicated to Mother Teresa in Wenceslas Square, Olomouc, Czech Republic

Other saints (including Teresa's namesake Thérèse of Lisieux, who called it a "night of nothingness") had similar experiences of spiritual dryness. According to James Langford, these doubts were typical and would not be an impediment to canonisation.

After ten years of doubt, Mother Teresa described a brief period of renewed faith. After Pope Pius XII's death in 1958, she was praying for him at a requiem Mass when she was relieved of "the long darkness: that strange suffering." Five weeks later her spiritual dryness returned.

Mother Teresa wrote many letters to her confessors and superiors over a 66-year period, most notably to Calcutta Archbishop Ferdinand Perier and Jesuit priest Celeste van Exem (her spiritual advisor since the formation of the Missionaries of Charity). She requested that her letters be destroyed, concerned that "people will think more of me – less of Jesus."

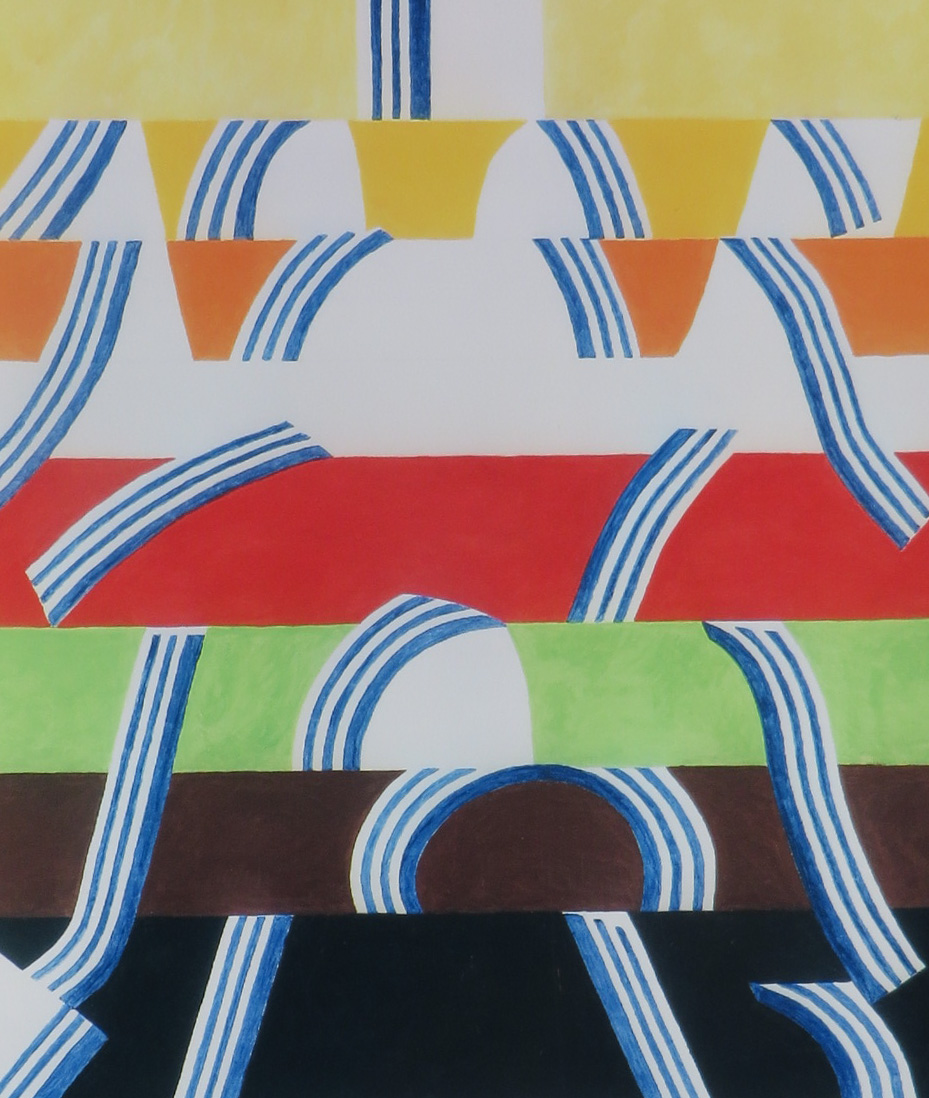
Semi-abstract painting honouring Mother Teresa

The correspondence was nevertheless compiled in Mother Teresa: Come Be My Light. Mother Teresa wrote to spiritual confidant Michael van der Peet, "Jesus has a very special love for you. [But] as for me, the silence and the emptiness is so great, that I look and do not see – listen and do not hear – the tongue moves [in prayer] but does not speak. [...] I want you to pray for me – that I let Him have [a] free hand."

In Deus caritas est (his first encyclical), Pope Benedict XVI mentioned Mother Teresa three times and used her life to clarify one of the encyclical's main points: "In the example of Blessed Teresa of Calcutta we have a clear illustration of the fact that time devoted to God in prayer not only does not detract from effective and loving service to our neighbour but is in fact the inexhaustible source of that service." She wrote, "It is only by mental prayer and spiritual reading that we can cultivate the gift of prayer."

Although her order was not connected with the Franciscan orders, Mother Teresa admired Francis of Assisi and was influenced by Franciscan spirituality. The Sisters of Charity recite the prayer of Saint Francis every morning at Mass during the thanksgiving after Communion, and their emphasis on ministry and many of their vows are similar. Francis emphasised poverty, chastity, obedience and submission to Christ. He devoted much of his life to serving the poor, particularly lepers.

== Canonization ==
=== Miracle and beatification ===
After Mother Teresa's death in 1997, the Holy See began the process of beatification (the second of three steps towards canonization) and Brian Kolodiejchuk was appointed postulator by the Diocese of Calcutta. Although he said, "We didn't have to prove that she was perfect or never made a mistake", he had to prove that Mother Teresa's virtue was heroic. Kolodiejchuk submitted 76 documents, totalling 35,000 pages, which were based on interviews with 113 witnesses who were asked to answer 263 questions.

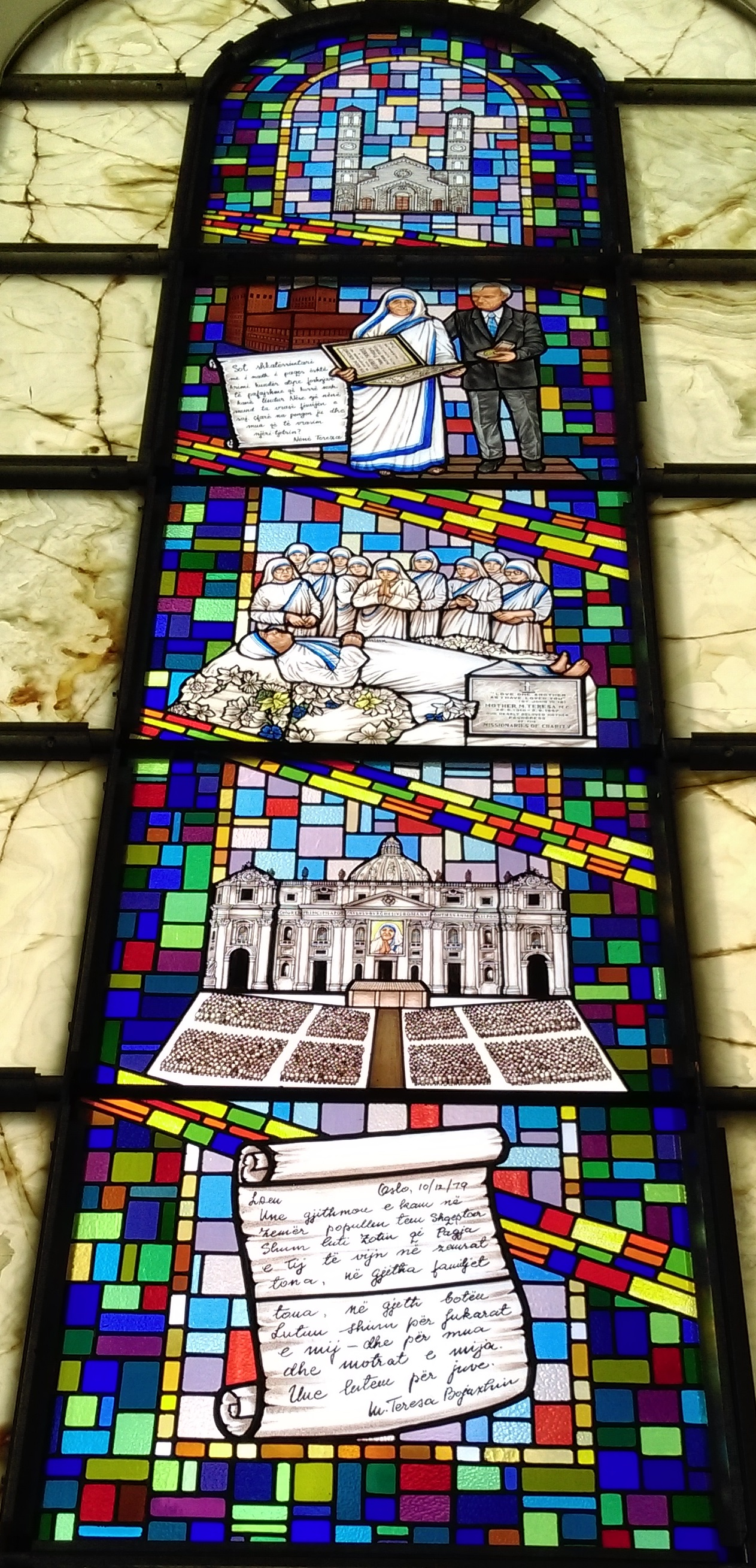
Stained glass depiction of key moments in the lifetime of Mother Teresa at the Cathedral of Saint Mother Teresa in Pristina, Kosovo

The process of canonisation requires the documentation of a miracle resulting from the intercession of the prospective saint. In 2002 the Vatican recognised as a miracle the healing of a tumour in the abdomen of Monica Besra, an Indian woman, after the application of a locket containing Teresa's picture. According to Besra, a beam of light emanated from the picture and her cancerous tumour was cured; her husband and some of her medical staff, however, said that conventional medical treatment eradicated the tumour. Ranjan Mustafi, who told The New York Times he had treated Besra, said that the cyst was caused by tuberculosis: "It was not a miracle ... She took medicines for nine months to one year." Even though Monica believed in the miracle, Besra's husband did not: "My wife was cured by the doctors and not by any miracle [...] This miracle is a hoax." Besra said that her medical records, including sonograms, prescriptions and physicians' notes, were confiscated by Sister Betta of the Missionaries of Charity. According to Time, calls to Sister Betta and the office of Sister Nirmala (Teresa's successor as head of the order) produced no comment. Officials at Balurghat Hospital, where Besra sought medical treatment, said that they were pressured by the order to call her cure miraculous.

During Mother Teresa's beatification and canonisation, the Vatican studied published and unpublished criticism of her life and work. Christopher Hitchens and Chatterjee (author of The Final Verdict, a book critical of Mother Teresa) spoke to the tribunal; according to Vatican officials, the allegations raised were investigated by the Congregation for the Causes of Saints. The group found no obstacle to Mother Teresa's canonisation, and issued its nihil obstat on 21 April 1999. Because of the attacks on her, some Catholic writers called her a sign of contradiction. Mother Teresa was beatified on 19 October 2003 and was known by Catholics as "Blessed".

=== Canonization ===
On 17 December 2015, the Vatican Press Office confirmed that Pope Francis recognised a second miracle attributed to Mother Teresa: the healing of a Brazilian man with multiple brain tumours back in 2008. The miracle first came to the attention of the postulation (officials managing the cause) during the events of World Youth Day 2013 when the pope was in Brazil that July. A subsequent investigation took place in Brazil from 19–26 June 2015 which was later transferred to the Congregation for the Causes of Saints who issued a decree recognizing the investigation to be completed.

Pope Francis canonised her at a ceremony on 4 September 2016 in St. Peter's Square in Vatican City. Tens of thousands of people witnessed the ceremony, including 15 government delegations and 1,500 homeless people from across Italy. It was televised live on the Vatican channel and streamed online; Skopje, Mother Teresa's hometown, announced a week-long celebration of her canonisation. In India, a special Mass was celebrated by the Missionaries of Charity in Calcutta.

== Co-Patron of Calcutta Archdiocese ==
On 4 September 2017, during a celebration honouring the 1st anniversary of her canonisation, Sister Mary Prema Pierick, Superior-General of the Missionaries of Charity, announced that Mother Teresa would be made the co-patron of the Calcutta Archdiocese during a Mass in the Cathedral of the Most Holy Rosary on 6 September 2017. On 5 September 2017, Archbishop Thomas D'Souza, who serves as head of the Roman Catholic Archdiocese of Calcutta, confirmed that Mother Teresa would be named co-patron of the Calcutta Diocese, alongside Francis Xavier. On 6 September 2017, about 500 people attended the Mass at a cathedral where Dominique Gomes, the local Vicar General, read the decree instituting her as the second patron saint of the archdiocese. The ceremony was also presided over by D'Souza and the Vatican's ambassador to India, Giambattista Diquattro, who lead the Mass and inaugurated a bronze statue in the church of Mother Teresa carrying a child.

The Catholic Church declared St. Francis Xavier the first patron saint of Calcutta in 1986.

== Legacy and depictions in popular culture ==
At the time of her death, the Missionaries of Charity had over 4,000 sisters and an associated brotherhood of 300 members operating 610 missions in 123 countries. These included hospices and homes for people with HIV/AIDS, leprosy and tuberculosis, soup kitchens, children's and family counselling programmes, orphanages and schools. The Missionaries of Charity were aided by co-workers numbering over one million by the 1990s.

=== Commemorations ===
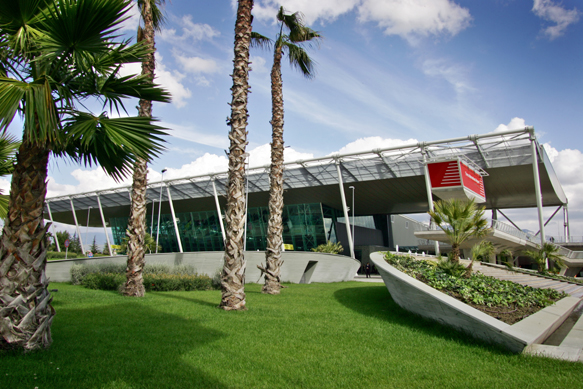
Tirana International Airport Nënë Tereza

Mother Teresa has been commemorated by museums and named the patroness of a number of churches. She has had buildings, roads and complexes named after her, including Albania's international airport. Mother Teresa Day (Dita e Nënë Terezës), 5 September, is a public holiday in Albania. In 2009, the Memorial House of Mother Teresa was opened in her hometown of Skopje, North Macedonia. The Cathedral of Blessed Mother Teresa in Pristina, Kosovo, is named in her honour. The demolition of a historic high school building to make way for the new construction initially sparked controversy in the local community, but the high school was later relocated to a new, more spacious campus. Consecrated on 5 September 2017, it became the first cathedral in Mother Teresa's honour and the second extant one in Kosovo.

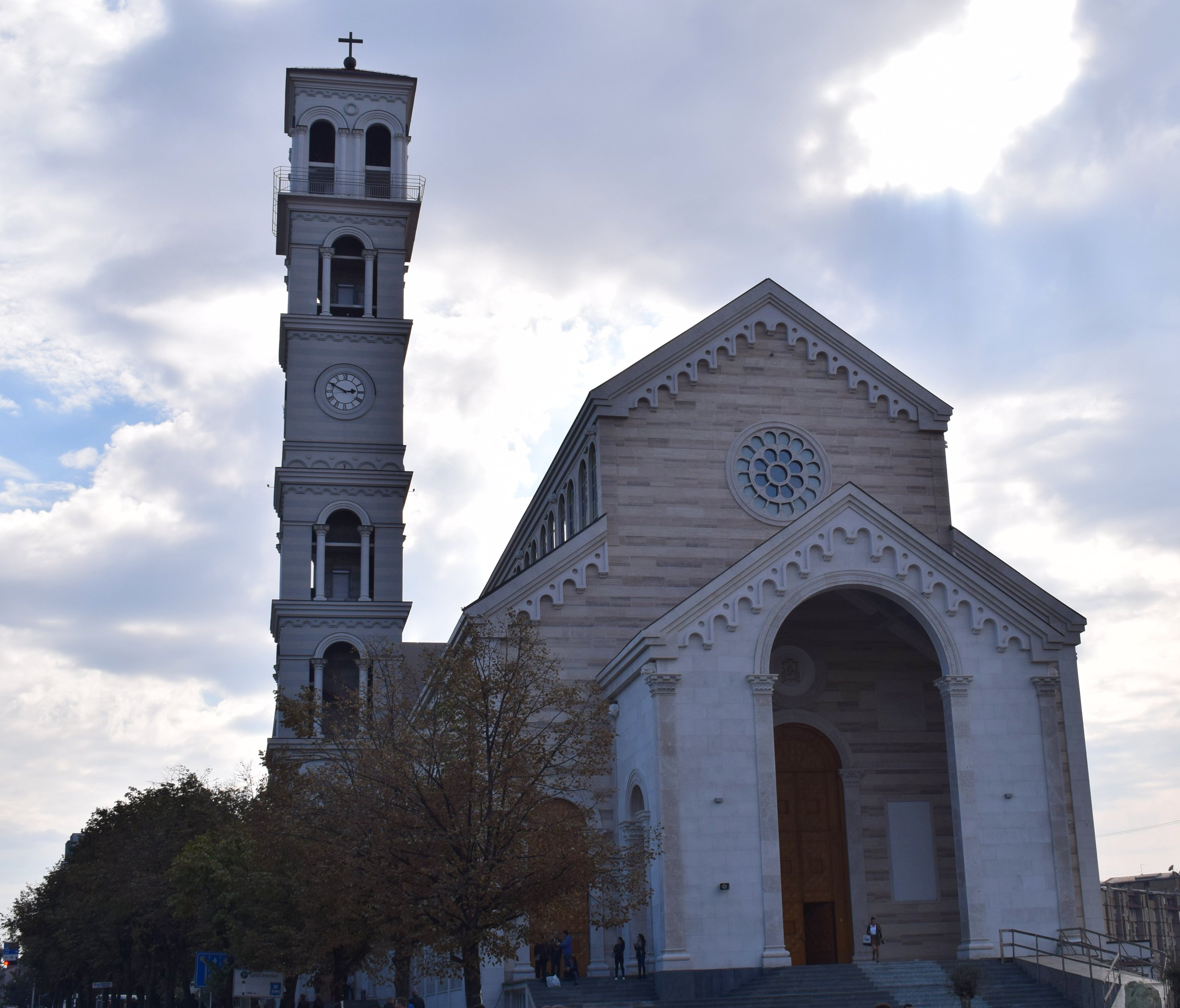
Cathedral of Saint Mother Teresa, Pristina

Mother Teresa Women's University, in Kodaikanal, was established in 1984 as a public university by the government of Tamil Nadu. The Mother Teresa Postgraduate and Research Institute of Health Sciences, in Pondicherry, was established in 1999 by the government of Puducherry. The charitable organisation Sevalaya runs the Mother Teresa Girls Home, providing poor and orphaned girls near the underserved village of Kasuva in Tamil Nadu with free food, clothing, shelter and education. A number of tributes by Mother Teresa's biographer, Navin Chawla, have appeared in Indian newspapers and magazines. Indian Railways introduced the "Mother Express", a new train named after Mother Teresa, on 26 August 2010 to commemorate the centenary of her birth. The Tamil Nadu government organised centenary celebrations honouring Mother Teresa on 4 December 2010 in Chennai, headed by chief minister M Karunanidhi. Beginning on 5 September 2013, the anniversary of her death has been designated the International Day of Charity by the United Nations General Assembly.

In 2012, Mother Teresa was ranked number 5 in Outlook India's poll of The Greatest Indian.

Ave Maria University in Ave Maria, Florida, is home to the Mother Teresa Museum.

== In art ==
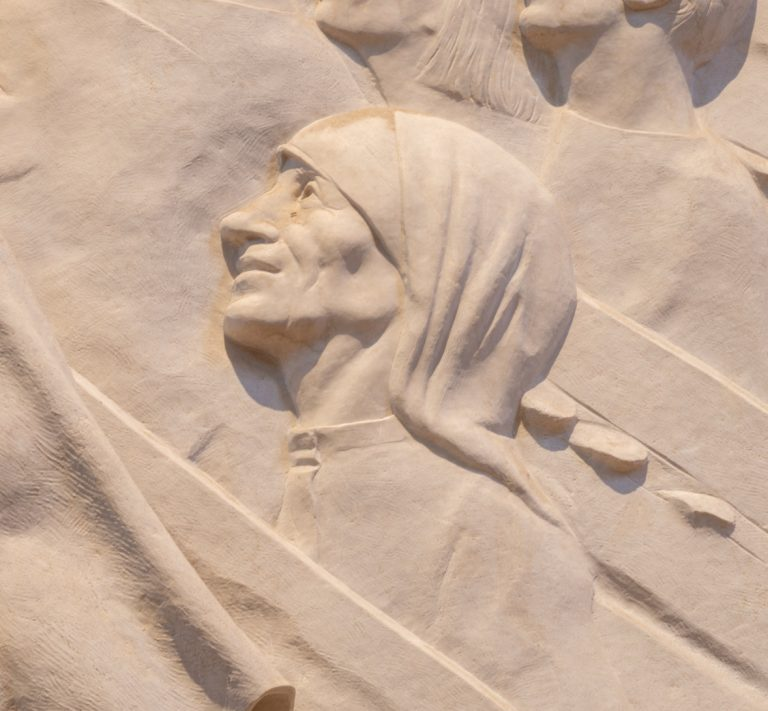
George Carr, The Universal Call to Holiness (detail) (1999)

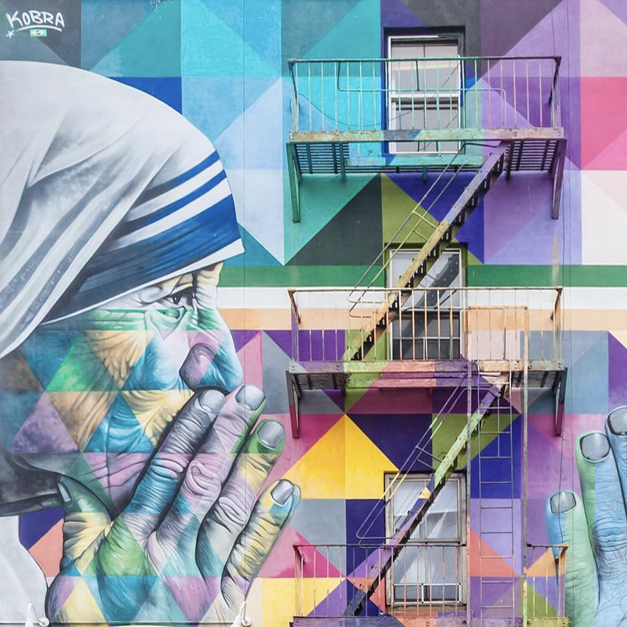
Eduardo Kobra, Tolerance (detail) (2018)

=== Film and literature ===
==== Documentaries and books ====
- Mother Teresa is the subject of a 1969 BBC documentary film and 1971 book, Something Beautiful for God, both undertaken by agnostic turned Christian Malcolm Muggeridge. The film has been credited with drawing the Western world's attention to Mother Teresa.
- Christopher Hitchens' 1994 documentary, Hell's Angel, argues that Mother Teresa urged the poor to accept their fate; the rich are portrayed as favoured by God. It was the precursor of Hitchens' essay, The Missionary Position: Mother Teresa in Theory and Practice.
- Mother of The Century (2001) and Mother Teresa (2002) are short documentary films, about the life and work of Mother Teresa among the poor of India, directed by Amar Kumar Bhattacharya. They were produced by the Films Division of the Government of India.
- Mother Teresa: No Greater Love (2022) is a documentary film featuring unusual access to institutional archives and how her vision to serve Christ among the poor is being implemented through the Missionaries of Charity.

==== Films and television ====
- Mother Teresa appeared in Bible Ki Kahaniyan, an Indian Christian television series based on the Bible which aired on DD National during the early 1990s. She introduced some of the episodes, laying down the importance of the Bible's message.
- Geraldine Chaplin played Mother Teresa in Mother Teresa: In the Name of God's Poor, which received a 1997 Art Film Festival award.
- She was played by Olivia Hussey in a 2003 Italian television miniseries, Mother Teresa of Calcutta. Re-released in 2007, it received a CAMIE award.
- Mother Teresa was played by Juliet Stevenson in the 2014 film The Letters, which was based on her letters to Vatican priest Celeste van Exem.
- Mother Teresa & Me (or Kavita & Teresa), a 2022 film by Indian-Swiss director Kamal Musale showcases her work among the poor and needy of Calcutta and the legacy and inspiration she has left behind. She was portrayed by Jacqueline Fritschi-Cornaz in the film.
- Mother Teresa was played by Noomi Rapace in the 2025 film Mother, which was based on a fictionalized account in her life when she decides to leave her convent to establish her own religious order.

==== Theatre ====
- Teresa, la Obra en Musical is a 2004 Argentine musical based on the life of Mother Teresa

== See also ==
- Abdul Sattar Edhi
- Albanians
- List of Albanians
- List of female Nobel laureates
- The Greatest Indian
- Catholic Church in Albania
- Catholic Church in Kosovo
- Catholic Church in North Macedonia

== Notes ==
Catholic Church titles
| New creation | Superior General of the Missionaries of Charity; 1950–1997 | Succeeded by Sister Nirmala Joshi, M.C. |
Awards
| Preceded by Genevieve Caulfield | Ramon Magsaysay Award; 1962 | Succeeded by Peace Corps |
| New award | Templeton Prize; 1973 | Succeeded by Frère Roger |
| Preceded by Anwar El Sadat, Menachem Begin | Nobel Peace Prize; 1979 | Succeeded by Adolfo Pérez Esquivel |
| Preceded by K. Kamaraj | Bharat Ratna; 1980 | Succeeded by Vinoba Bhave |
