= Malcolm Muggeridge =

British journalist, author, media personality, and satirist (1903–1990)

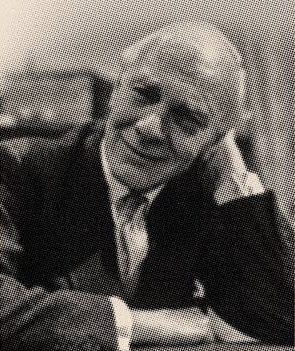
- Born: Thomas Malcolm Muggeridge; 24 March 1903; Sanderstead, Surrey, England
- Died: 14 November 1990 (aged 87); Hastings, East Sussex, England
- Education: Selwyn College, Cambridge
- Occupations: Journalist; author; satirist
- Spouse: Katherine Dobbs (m. 1927)
- Children: 4
- Relatives: H. T. Muggeridge (father)

Thomas Malcolm Muggeridge (24 March 1903 – 14 November 1990) was a British journalist and satirist. His father, H. T. Muggeridge, was a socialist politician and one of the early Labour Party Members of Parliament (for Romford, in Essex). Malcolm's brother Eric was one of the founders of Plan International. In his twenties, Muggeridge was attracted to communism and went to live in the Soviet Union in the 1930s, and the experience turned him into an anti-communist.

During World War II, he worked for the British government as a soldier and a spy, first in East Africa for two years and then in Paris. In the aftermath of the war, he converted to Christianity under the influence of Hugh Kingsmill and helped to bring Mother Teresa to popular attention in the West. He was a critic of the sexual revolution and of drug use.

Muggeridge kept detailed diaries for much of his life, which were published in 1981 under the title Like It Was: The Diaries of Malcolm Muggeridge, and he developed them into two volumes of an uncompleted autobiography Chronicles of Wasted Time.

== Early life and career ==
Muggeridge's father, Henry (known as H. T. Muggeridge), served as a Labour Party councillor in the local government of Croydon, South London, as a founder-member of the Fabian Society, and as a Labour Member of Parliament for Romford (1929–1931) during Ramsay MacDonald's second Labour government. Muggeridge's biographer Richard Ingrams described H.T. as "a small bearded man with a large frame, a twinkling eye, and a rather bulbous nose which he passed on to his son." Muggeridge's mother was Annie Booler.

The middle of five brothers, Muggeridge was born in Sanderstead, Surrey. His first name, Thomas, was chosen by H.T. in honour of his hero Thomas Carlyle. He grew up in Croydon and attended Selhurst Grammar School there and then Selwyn College, Cambridge, for four years. Still a student, he taught for brief periods in 1920, 1922 and 1924 at the John Ruskin Central School, Croydon, where his father was Chairman of the Governors. After graduating in 1924 with a pass degree in natural sciences, he went to British India for three years to teach English literature at Union Christian College, Aluva, Kingdom of Cochin. His writing career began during his time in the Kingdom via an exchange of correspondence on war and peace with Mahatma Gandhi, with Muggeridge's article on the interactions being published in Young India, a local magazine.

Returning to Britain in 1927, he married Katherine "Kitty" Dobbs (1903–1994), (Note: Flynn 1994 gives her birth name as "Kathleen", but that appears to be an error, see Krebs 1990 and other online sources.) the daughter of Rosalind Dobbs (a younger sister of Beatrice Webb). He worked as a supply teacher before moving to teach English literature in Egypt six months later. There he met Arthur Ransome, who was visiting Egypt as a journalist for the Manchester Guardian. Ransome recommended Muggeridge to the newspaper's editors, who offered Muggeridge his first position in journalism.

== Moscow ==
Initially attracted by communism, Muggeridge and his wife travelled to Moscow in 1932. He was to be a correspondent for the Manchester Guardian standing in for William Henry Chamberlin, who was about to take a leave of absence. During Muggeridge's early time in Moscow he was completing a novel, Picture Palace, loosely based on his experiences and observations at the Manchester Guardian. It was completed and submitted to publishers in January 1933, but there was concern by the publishers over potential libel claims, and the published book was not distributed. Very few first-edition copies exist today. That setback caused considerable financial difficulties for Muggeridge, who was not employed and was paid only for articles that were accepted.

Increasingly disillusioned by his close observation of communism in practice, Muggeridge decided to investigate reports of the famine in Ukraine by travelling there and to the Caucasus without first obtaining the permission of the Soviet authorities. The revealing reports that he sent back to The Manchester Guardian in the diplomatic bag, thus evading censorship, were not fully printed, and those that were published (on 25, 27 and 28 March 1933) were not published under Muggeridge's name. Meanwhile, fellow journalist Gareth Jones, who had met Muggeridge in Moscow, published his own stories. The two accounts helped to confirm the extent of a famine. Writing in The New York Times Walter Duranty denied the existence of any famine. Jones wrote letters to the Manchester Guardian in support of Muggeridge's articles about the famine.

Having come into conflict with British newspapers' editorial policy of not provoking the authorities in the Soviet Union, Muggeridge returned to novel writing. He wrote Winter in Moscow (1934), which describes conditions in the "socialist utopia" and satirised Western journalists' uncritical view of the Soviet regime. He was later to call Duranty "the greatest liar I have met in journalism". Later, he began a writing partnership with Hugh Kingsmill. Muggeridge's politics changed from an independent socialist point of view to a conservative religious stance. He wrote later:

I wrote in a mood of anger, which I find rather absurd now: not so much because the anger was, in itself, unjustified, as because getting angry about human affairs is as ridiculous as losing one's temper when an air flight is delayed.

— Muggeridge 1973, p. 274

== Return to India ==
After his time in Moscow, Muggeridge worked on other newspapers, including The Statesman in Calcutta, of which he was editor from 1934 to 1936. In his second stint in India, he lived by himself in Calcutta, having left behind his wife and children in London. Between 1930 and 1936, the Muggeridges had three sons and a daughter. His office was in the headquarters of the newspaper in Chowringhee.

== Second World War ==
When war was declared, Muggeridge, now aged 36, went to Maidstone to join up but was sent away as too old: "My generation felt they'd missed the First War, now was the time to make up." He was called into the Ministry of Information, which he called "a most appalling set-up", and joined the army as a private. He joined the Corps of Military Police and was commissioned on the General List in May 1940. He transferred to the Intelligence Corps as a lieutenant in June 1942. Having spent two years as a Regimental Intelligence Officer in Britain, he was in 1942 recruited by MI6 and was posted to Lourenço Marques, the capital of Mozambique, as a bogus vice-consul (called a Special Correspondent by London Controlling Section). Before heading out, Muggeridge stayed in Lisbon for some months, waiting for his visa to come through. He stayed in Estoril at the Pensão Royal on 17 May 1942.

His mission was to prevent information about Allied convoys off the coast of Africa falling into enemy hands. He wrote later that he also attempted suicide. After the Allied occupation of North Africa, he was posted to Algiers as liaison officer with the French sécurité militaire. At the time of the liberation, in that capacity, he was sent to Paris and worked alongside Charles de Gaulle's Free French Forces. He had a high regard for de Gaulle and considered him a greater man than Churchill. He was warned to expect some anti-British feeling in Paris because of the attack on Mers-el-Kébir. In fact, Muggeridge, speaking on the BBC retrospective programme Muggeridge: Ancient & Modern, said that he had encountered no such feeling and indeed had been allowed on occasion to eat and drink for nothing at Maxim's. He was assigned to make an initial investigation into P. G. Wodehouse's five broadcasts from Berlin during the war. Though he was prepared to dislike Wodehouse, the interview became the start of a lifelong friendship and publishing relationship as well as the subject for several plays. He also interviewed Coco Chanel in Paris about the nature of her involvement with the Nazis in Vichy France during the war. Muggeridge ended the war as a major, having received the Croix de Guerre from the French government for undisclosed reasons.

== Later life ==
Muggeridge wrote for the Evening Standard and also for The Daily Telegraph where he was appointed deputy editor in 1950. He kept detailed diaries, which provide a vivid picture of the journalistic and political London of the day, including regular contact with George Orwell, Anthony Powell, Graham Greene and Bill Deedes; and he comments perceptively on Ian Fleming, Guy Burgess and Kim Philby.

When George Orwell died in 1950, Muggeridge and Anthony Powell organized Orwell's funeral.

Muggeridge also acted as Washington correspondent for The Daily Telegraph. He was editor of Punch magazine from 1953 to 1957, a challenging appointment for one who claimed that "there is no occupation more wretched than trying to make the English laugh". One of his first acts was to sack the illustrator E. H. Shepard. In 1957, he received public and professional opprobrium for criticism of the British monarchy in a US magazine, The Saturday Evening Post. The article was given the title "Does England Really Need a Queen?", and its publication was delayed by five months to coincide with the Royal State Visit to Washington, DC taking place later that year. It was little more than a rehash of views expressed in a 1955 article, Royal Soap Opera, but its timing caused outrage in the UK, and a contract with Beaverbrook Newspapers was cancelled. His notoriety then propelled him into becoming better known as a broadcaster, with regular appearances on the BBC's Panorama, and a reputation as a tough interviewer. Encounters with Brendan Behan and Salvador Dalí cemented his reputation as a fearless critic of modern life.

Muggeridge was described as having predatory behaviour towards women during his BBC years. He was described as a "compulsive groper", reportedly being nicknamed "The Pouncer" and as "a man fully deserving of the acronym NSIT—not safe in taxis". His niece confirmed these reports, while also reflecting on the suffering inflicted on his family and saying that he changed his behaviour when he converted to Christianity in the 1960s.

In the early 1960s, Muggeridge became a vegetarian so that he would be "free to denounce those horrible factory farms where animals are raised for food".

He took to frequently denouncing the new sexual laxity of the Swinging Sixties on radio and television. He particularly railed against "pills and pot": birth control pills and cannabis.

In contrast, he met the Beatles before they were famous: On 7 June 1961 he flew to Hamburg for an interview with the Stern magazine and afterwards went out on the town and ended up at the Top Ten Club on the Reeperbahn. In his diary, he described their performance as "bashing their instruments, and emitting nerveless sounds into microphones". However, they recognised him from the television and they entered into conversation. He acknowledged that "their faces [were] like Renaissance carvings of the saints or Blessed Virgins".

His book, Tread Softly for You Tread on My Jokes (1966), though acerbic in its wit, revealed a serious view of life. The title is an allusion to the last line of the poem Aedh Wishes for the Cloths of Heaven by William Butler Yeats: "Tread softly because you tread on my dreams." In 1967, he preached at Great St Mary's, Cambridge, and again in 1970.

Having been elected Rector of Edinburgh University, Muggeridge was goaded by the editor of The Student, Anna Coote, to support the call for contraceptive pills to be available at the University Health Centre. He used a sermon at St Giles' Cathedral in January 1968 to resign the post to protest against the Students' Representative Council's views on "pot and pills". The sermon was published under the title "Another King".

Muggeridge resigned as a judge for the 1971 Booker Prize because of his "general lack of sympathy with entries for this year's Booker Prize" and was replaced on the panel by Philip Toynbee.

Muggeridge was also known for his wit and profound writings often at odds with the opinions of the day. "Never forget that only dead fish swim with the stream", he liked to quote. He wrote two volumes of an autobiography called Chronicles of Wasted Time (the title is a quotation from Shakespeare's sonnet 106). The first volume (1972) was The Green Stick. The second volume (1973) was The Infernal Grove. A projected third volume, The Right Eye, covering the postwar period, was never completed.

=== Conversion to Christianity ===
Muggeridge became a leading figure in the Nationwide Festival of Light in 1971 protesting against the commercial exploitation of sex and violence in Britain and advocating the teaching of Christ as the key to recovering moral stability in the nation. He said at the time: "The media today—press, television, and radio—are largely in the hands of those who favour the present Gadarene slide into decadence and Godlessness."

=== Criticism of Life of Brian ===
In 1979, along with Mervyn Stockwood, the Bishop of Southwark, Muggeridge appeared on the chat show Friday Night, Saturday Morning to discuss the film Life of Brian with Monty Python members John Cleese and Michael Palin. Although the Python members gave reasons that they believed the film to be neither anti-Christian nor mocking the person of Jesus, both Muggeridge and the bishop insisted that they were being disingenuous and that the film was anti-Christian and blasphemous. Muggeridge declared their film to be "buffoonery", "tenth-rate", "this miserable little film" and "this little squalid number". He stated that there was "nothing in this film that could possibly destroy anybody's genuine faith"; the Pythons were quick to point out the futility of criticising it so vitriolically since Muggeridge did not think it was significant enough to affect anyone. According to Palin, Muggeridge arrived late for the film and missed the two scenes in which Jesus and Brian were distinguished as different people. The discussion was moderated by Tim Rice, the lyricist for the musical Jesus Christ Superstar, which had also generated some controversy in Britain about a decade earlier over its depiction of Jesus.

The comedians later expressed disappointment in Muggeridge, whom all in Monty Python had previously respected as a satirist. Cleese said that his reputation had "plummeted" in his eyes, and Palin commented, "He was just being Muggeridge, preferring to have a very strong contrary opinion as opposed to none at all".

=== Later years ===
In 1982, at 79, Muggeridge was received into the Catholic Church after he had rejected Anglicanism, like his wife, Kitty. This was largely under the influence of Mother Teresa about whom he had written a book, Something Beautiful for God, setting out and interpreting her life. His last book, Conversion (1988), describes his life as a 20th century pilgrimage, a spiritual journey.

Muggeridge died on 14 November 1990 in a nursing home in Hastings, England, at the age of 87. He had suffered a stroke three years earlier.

== Legacy ==
An eponymous literary society was established on 24 March 2003, the occasion of his centenary, and it publishes a quarterly newsletter, The Gargoyle. The Malcolm Muggeridge Society, based in Britain, is progressively republishing his works. Muggeridge's papers are in the Special Collections at Wheaton College, Illinois, US.

In November 2008, on the 75th anniversary of the Ukraine famine, both Muggeridge and Gareth Jones were posthumously awarded the Ukrainian Order of Merit III Class to mark their exceptional services to the country and its people.

In an interview on the Eric Metaxas Radio Show, Christian apologist Ravi Zacharias identified Malcolm Muggeridge and G. K. Chesterton as two important influencers in his life.

A week following Muggeridge's death, William F. Buckley Jr. wrote a tribute published in The Washington Post. Buckley, in an interview on C-SPAN, described Muggeridge as "a wonderful, wonderful, wonderful man, a great wit and a brilliant, brilliant analyst."

== Works ==
=== Books ===
- Three Flats: A Play in Three Acts (1931)
- Winter in Moscow (1934) ISBN 080280263X
- Picture Palace (1934, 1987) ISBN 0-297-79039-0
- La Russie. Vue par Malcolme [sic] Muggeridge. Paris, Imprimerie Pascal, N.d.(c. 1934) 14pp.
- The Earnest Atheist: A Study of Samuel Butler, London: Eyre & Spottiswoode (1936)
- In a Valley of This Restless Mind (1938) Reprinted in 1978 with introduction by Muggeridge and illustrations by Papas ISBN 0-00-216337-3
- The Thirties, 1930–1940, in Great Britain (1940, 1989) ISBN 0-297-79570-8
- Ciano, Count Galeazzo. Ciano's Diary, 1939–1943 (1947). Edited with an introduction by Muggeridge
- Affairs of the Heart (1949)
- Bentley, Nicholas (1957). How Can you Bear to be Human?. London: Andre Deutsch. Muggeridge wrote the introduction.
- Tread Softly for You Tread on My Jokes (1966). Collection of essays
- Jesus Rediscovered (1969) ISBN 0-00-621939-X
- Muggeridge Through the Microphone: BBC Radio and Television (1969). Broadcasts
- Something Beautiful for God (1971) ISBN 0-00-215769-1 Muggeridge introduced Mother Teresa to the world with this book
- Paul, Envoy Extraordinary (1972) with Alec Vidler, ISBN 0-00-215644-X
- Chronicles of Wasted Time. Vol. 1: The Green Stick. New York: Morrow. 1973. ISBN 0688-00191-2. OCLC 283705853. OL 24203423M. London: Collins, 1972
- Chronicles of Wasted Time. Vol. 2: The Infernal Grove. New York: Morrow. 1974. ISBN 0688-00300-1. London, Collins, 1973
- Jesus: The Man Who Lives (1975) ISBN 0-00-211388-0
- A Third Testament: A Modern Pilgrim Explores the Spiritual Wanderings of Augustine, Blake, Pascal, Tolstoy, Bonhoeffer, Kierkegaard, and Dostoevsky. Little, Brown. 1976.
- Christ and the Media (1977) ISBN 0-340-22438-X
- Hesketh Pearson. The Smith of Smiths: Being the Life, Wit and Humour of Sydney Smith (Folio Society, 1977). New introduction by Muggeridge; book first published 1934.
- Things Past (1979)
- The End of Christendom (1980) ISBN 0-8028-1837-4
- Like it Was: The Diaries of Malcolm Muggeridge (1981) ISBN 0-00-216468-X
- My Life in Pictures. London: Herbert Press. 1987. ISBN 0906969603. OL 2473679M.
- Conversion: The Spiritual Journey of a Twentieth Century Pilgrim (1988, 2005) ISBN 1-59752-101-9

=== Sermons and lectures ===
- Ultimate Concern: 'Am I a Christian?', etc., Cambridge (1967)
- Living Water, Aberdeen (1968) ISBN 0-7152-0016-X
- Another King, St Andrews Press (1968)
- Still I Believe: Nine Talks Broadcast during Lent and Holy Week (1969), ISBN 0-563-08552-5
- Light in our Darkness, Edinburgh (1969) ISBN 0-7152-0069-0
- Fundamental Questions: What is Life About?, Cambridge (1970)
- The Authority and Relevance of the Bible in the Modern World (Bible Society of Australia, 1976)
- "America Needs a Punch," Esquire (April 1958), 59–60, 60

== Filmography ==
Year	Title	Role	Notes
1959	I'm All Right Jack	T.V. Panel Chairman	
1963	Heavens Above!	Cleric	
1966	Alice in Wonderland	Gryphon	
1967	Herostratus	Radio Presenter	Voice

== See also ==
- Samuel Butler – the subject of Muggeridge's 1936 study.
- The 2011 television film Holy Flying Circus, broadcast on BBC Four in October 2011, which features a fictional account of Muggeridge and the Pythons' debate on the above programme.
- Beside the Seaside, 1934 – Bournemouth Contains commissioned article about this seaside resort

Media offices
Preceded by Colin Coote	Deputy Editor of The Daily Telegraph; 1950–1953	Succeeded by Ivor Bulmer-Thomas
Academic offices
Preceded by James Robertson Justice	Rector of the University of Edinburgh; 1966–1969	Succeeded by Kenneth Allsop
