= Missionaries of Charity =

Roman Catholic religious order

- Congregatio Missionariarum a Caritate
- Abbreviation: M.C.
- Formation: 7 October 1950; 75 years ago
- Founder: Mother Teresa
- Type: Religious institute; Religious congregation
- Headquarters: 54/a Acharya Jagadish Chandra Bose Road, Kolkata, India
- Members: 5,076 members as of 2025
- Superior general: Sr. Mary Joseph, MC
- Website: missionariesofcharity.org
- Remarks: Motto: "Whatever you do to the least of my brethren, you did it to Me" (taken from Matthew 25:40)

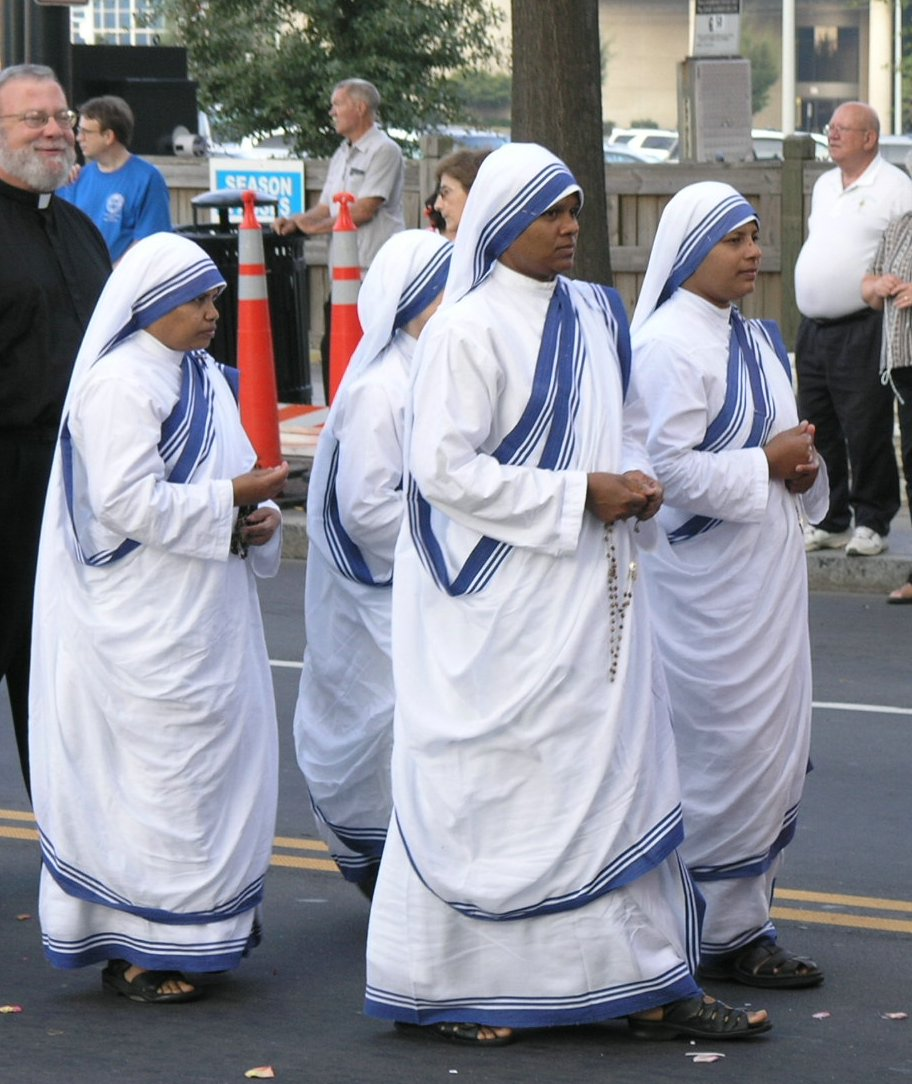
Sisters belonging to the Missionaries of Charity in their attire of traditional white sari with blue border

The Missionaries of Charity (Latin: Congregatio Missionariarum a Caritate) is a Catholic centralised religious institute of consecrated life of pontifical right for women established in 1950 by Mother Teresa. As of 2023, it consisted of 5,750 members of religious sisters. Members of the order designate their affiliation using the order's initials, "M.C." A member of the congregation must adhere to the vows of chastity, poverty, obedience, and the fourth vow, to give "wholehearted free service to the poorest of the poor". Today, the order consists of both contemplative and active branches in several countries.

Missionaries care for those who include refugees, former prostitutes, the mentally ill, sick children, abandoned children, lepers, people with AIDS, the aged, and convalescent. They have schools that are run by volunteers to teach abandoned street children and run soup kitchens as well as other services according to the community needs. These services are provided, without charge, to people regardless of their religion or social status.

== History ==
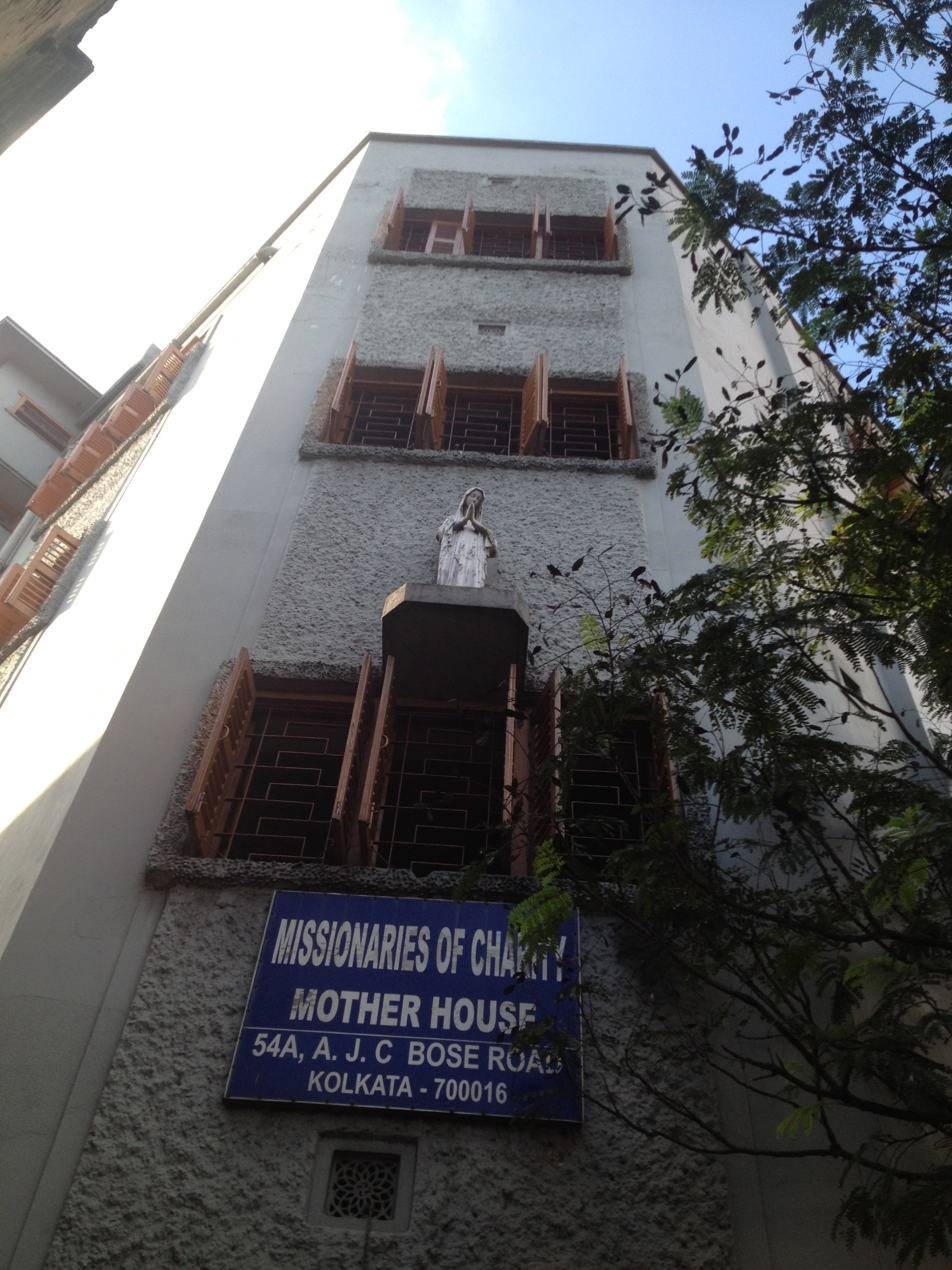
Missionaries of Charity's mother house (headquarters) in Kolkata

On 7 October 1950, Mother Teresa and the small community formed by her former pupils was labelled as the Diocesan Congregation of the Calcutta Diocese, and thus received the permission from the Diocese of Calcutta to identify as a Catholic organization. Their mission was to care for (in Mother Teresa's words) "the hungry, the naked, the homeless, the crippled, the blind, the lepers, all those people who feel unwanted, unloved, uncared for throughout society, people that have become a burden to the society and are shunned by everyone." It began as a small community with 12 members in Calcutta (now Kolkata), and in 2023 had 5,750 members serving in 139 countries in 760 homes, with 244 of these homes in India. The sisters run orphanages, homes for those dying of AIDS, charity centres worldwide and care for refugees, the blind, disabled, aged, alcoholics, the poor, homeless and also victims of natural disasters, epidemics, famine in Asia, Africa, Latin America, North America, Europe and Australia. They have 19 homes in Kolkata (Calcutta) alone which include homes for women, orphaned children and homes for the dying; a school for street children, and a leper colony.

In 1963, Brother Andrew (formerly Ian Travers-Ballan) founded the Missionary Brothers of Charity in Australia with Mother Teresa.

In 1965, by granting a Decree of Praise, Pope Paul VI granted Mother Teresa's request to expand her congregation to other countries. The Congregation started to grow rapidly, with new homes opening all over the globe. The congregation's first house outside India was in Venezuela, others followed in Rome and Tanzania and worldwide.

In 1979 the contemplative branch of the Brothers was added and in 1984 a priest branch, the Missionaries of Charity Fathers, was founded by Mother Teresa with Fr. Joseph Langford, combining the vocation of the Missionaries of Charity with the Ministerial Priesthood. As with the Sisters, the Fathers live a very simple lifestyle without television, radios or items of convenience. They neither smoke nor drink alcohol and beg for their food. They make a visit to their families every five years but do not take annual holidays. Lay Catholics and non-Catholics constitute the Co-Workers of Mother Teresa, the Sick and Suffering Co-Workers, and the Lay Missionaries of Charity.

The first home of the Missionaries of Charity in the United States was established in the South Bronx, New York, where in 2019 they had convents for both their active and contemplative branches, and had placed 108 sisters in their province that stretches from Quebec to Washington, DC. Their first rural mission in the United States, in 1982, was in one of the poorest, former coal mining areas of Kentucky, where they still serve. In the US, the Missionaries of Charity are affiliated with the Council of Major Superiors of Women Religious, a body of female religious, representing 20% of American religious sisters. They are identified by the wearing of religious habits, and loyalty to church teaching. By 1996, the organisation was operating 517 missions in more than 100 countries.

In 1990, Mother Teresa asked to resign as head of the Missionaries but was voted back in as Superior General. On 13 March 1997, six months before Mother Teresa's death, Sister Mary Nirmala Joshi was elected the new Superior General of the Missionaries of Charity. In April 2009, Sister Mary Prema was elected to succeed Sister Nirmala, during a general chapter held in Kolkata.

The quality of care offered to terminally ill patients in the Home for the Dying in Calcutta was the subject of discussion in the mid-1990s. Some British observers drew unfavourable comparisons with the standard of care available in hospices in the United Kingdom. Remarks made by Dr. Robin Fox relative to the lack of full-time medically trained personnel and the absence of strong analgesics were published in a brief memoir in an issue of The Lancet in 1994. These remarks were criticised in a later issue of The Lancet on the ground that they failed to take account of Indian conditions, specifically the fact that government regulations effectively precluded the use of morphine outside large hospitals.

In Phoenix, Arizona, the sisters' accommodation for 40 homeless men is funded by a clothier, featured in Vogue, who grew up within a few blocks of Mother Teresa's original home for the dying destitute in Kalighat, Calcutta.

In June 1991, Mother Teresa with Sr Raphael arrived in Baghdad, Iraq just after the First Gulf War ended. She opened her first 'Missionaries of Charity' house especially dedicating to the unwanted, neglected, disabled, and orphaned children.

The Missionaries of Charity sisters were particularly hard hit by the 2020 outbreak of COVID-19, as in places they continued to distribute food and minister to the poor who had been affected.

In April 2022, Sister Mary Joseph was elected to succeed Sister Mary Prema as superior general of the order, with Sister Mary Christie elected as assistant superior general.

=== Violence against missionaries ===
In July 1998 in Al Hudaydah, Yemen, three Missionaries of Charity, two Indians and a Filipina, were shot and killed as they left a hospital.

In March 2016 in Aden, Yemen, sixteen people were shot and killed in a home for the elderly operated by the Missionaries of Charity. Among the dead were four missionary sisters: Sisters Marguerite and Reginette from Rwanda, Sister Anselm from India and Sister Judit from Kenya. According to Bishop Paul Hinder of the Apostolic Vicariate of Southern Arabia, their superior escaped harm by hiding. Bishop Hinder described the attack as "religiously-motivated". A Salesian Syro-Malabar priest who was living at the facility, Fr. Tom Uzhunnalil of Bangalore, India, was taken prisoner by the attackers.

On Good Friday, 25 March 2016, several media outlets reported that Fr. Tom Uzhunnalil had been crucified by the Islamic State of Iraq and the Levant. However, Bishop Hinder indicated he had strong indications that the priest was alive and still being held by his captors. In early September 2017 Fr. Uzhunnalil was rescued after 18 months in captivity, and first sent to the Vatican to meet with Pope Francis.

== Becoming a Missionary of Charity ==
It takes nine years to become a full-fledged Missionary of Charity. An initial short-term "come-and-see" period is available. Those considered possible candidates by the Congregation may enter Aspirancy, focused on learning English (which is the community language) for those who are not from English-speaking countries and religious studies. It is followed by Postulancy (introduction into the study of Scripture, the Constitutions of the Society, Church history, and theology). If found suitable, they enter the Novitiate, the beginning of the religious life. Novices wear white cotton habits with a girdle, and white saris without the three blue stripes. In the first year (called canonical), they undertake more religious study and learn about life as a Missionary of Charity, the second year is more focused on practical training for the mission life. After two years, they take temporary vows for one year, which are renewed annually, for five years in total. They also receive a metal crucifix and a sari whose three blue stripes stand for their vows of poverty, chastity, and obedience. In the sixth year, they travel to Rome, Kolkata or Washington D.C. for "Tertianship", further religious study, at the end of which they make their final profession.

=== Material goods ===
A sister's few possessions include: three saris (one to wear, one to wash, one to mend), two or three cotton habits, a girdle, a pair of sandals, a crucifix, and a rosary. They also have a plate, a set of cutlery, a cloth napkin, a canvas bag, and a prayer book. In cold countries, sisters may own a cardigan and other articles suited to the local climate such as a coat, scarf, and closed shoes.

== Controversies ==
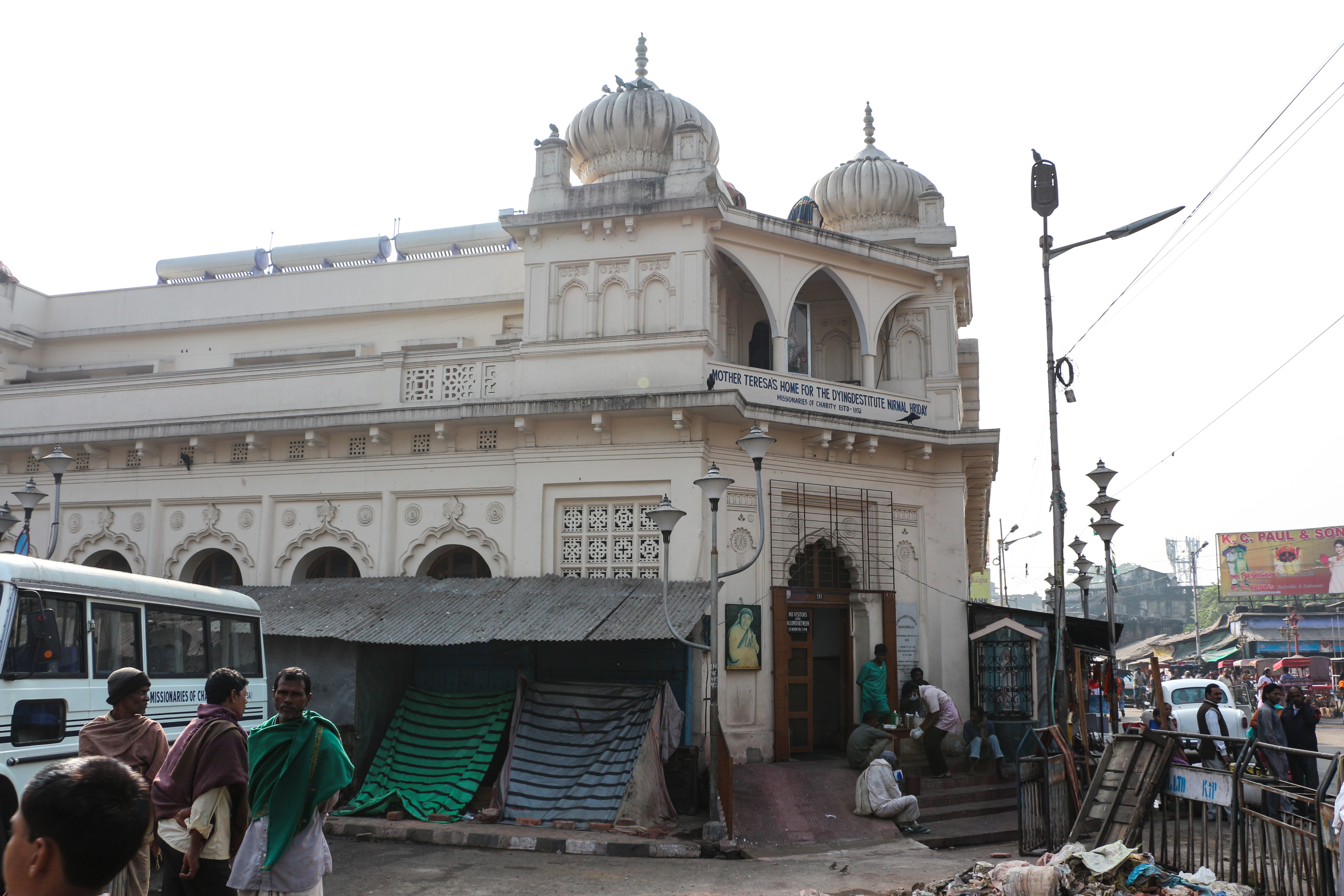
Mother Teresa's home for the dying destitute Nirmal Hriday at Kalighat, Kolkata.

A British former volunteer at the Home, Robin Fox (now editor of the British medical journal The Lancet) disclosed in 1994 that syringes were rinsed in cold water and reused; that inmates were given cold baths; and that aspirin was administered to people with terminal cancer. Fox also noted, however, that the residents were "eating heartily and doing well", and that the sisters and volunteers focused on cleanliness, tending wounds and sores, and providing loving kindness. The controversy remains due to the use of unsterilized needles and the failure to make proper diagnoses, as put by Dr. Jack Preger: "If one wants to give love, understanding and care, one uses sterile needles."

In 2018, all child care homes in India run by the Missionaries of Charity were inspected by the Indian Ministry of Women and Child Development following allegations that two staff members at a Jharkhand home sold babies for adoption. A sister (Konsaila Balsa) and a social worker (Anima Indwar) employed there were arrested. They were accused of having already sold three babies from the home, which provides shelter for pregnant, unmarried women, and of trying to sell a baby boy for roughly £1,325. The Missionaries of Charity had discontinued its participation in adoption services in India three years earlier over religious objections to the country's new adoption rules. In December 2021, India's Ministry of Home Affairs headed by former BJP national president Amit Shah refused to renew the registration under Foreign Contribution Regulation Act of Missionaries of Charity along with 6000 other charity organizations, which is mandatory for charities, NGOs and any non-profit organizations receiving foreign funding in India registration over allegations of the organization aiding in conversion of Hindus to Catholicism (an allegation which has also been levelled against Teresa too). However the decision was subsequently reverted in the first week of January 2022.

== See also ==
- Catholic missions
