= Herbert L. Ogier =

Navy commander

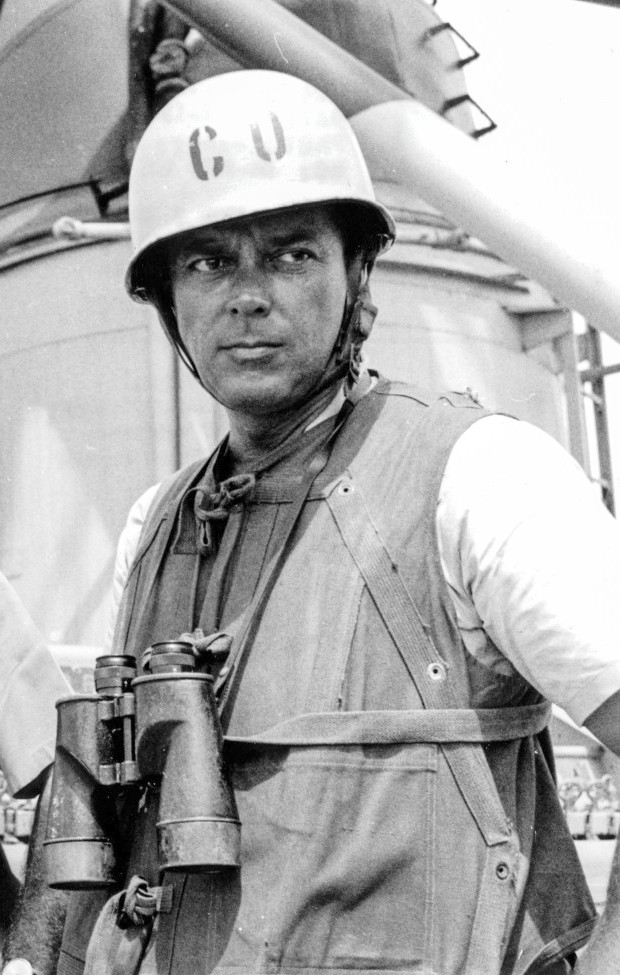
Commander Herbert L. Ogier aboard USS Maddox, 1964

Navy Commander Herbert L. Ogier was the commanding officer (CO) of the destroyer USS Maddox when it was involved in the Gulf of Tonkin Incident. Captain John J. Herrick, who was commander of the destroyer division that included Maddox, was also on the ship during the incident. On August 2, 1964, the Maddox was approached by three North Vietnamese torpedo boats. With permission from Herrick, Ogier ordered the gunnery officer to fire at the boats when they came within 10,000 yards (9,100 m) of the destroyer. Ogier maneuvered Maddox to narrowly avoid being struck by torpedoes. With the help of F-8 Crusader jets operating from the aircraft carrier USS Ticonderoga, the North Vietnamese boats were forced to retreat, and the Maddox suffered only minor damage and no injuries.

In 2005, a Top Secret National Security Agency (NSA) historical study was declassified. The report stated, regarding the August 2 incident, "At about 1505G, the Maddox fired three rounds to warn off the communist boats. This initial action was never reported by the Johnson administration, which insisted that the Vietnamese boats fired first." The NSA report also concluded that a possible second attack on August 4 did not occur. President Lyndon B. Johnson based the Gulf of Tonkin Resolution on this second attack.

== Service in the U.S. Navy ==
Herbert Ogier graduated from he U.S. Naval Academy, Annapolis in 1944. He served as a gunnery officer on the USS California and the USS Valley Forge between 1944 and 1948. He was promoted to Lieutenant in 1950 and taught engineering at the Naval Academy from 1950 to 1952.

Herbert L. Ogier
- Born: 01/12/1923; Baltimore, MD
- Died: 04/16/2002; Houston, TX
- Education: Naval Academy, Annapolis (BS 1944); University of Houston Law School (JD 1975)
- Spouse: Leila C. Ogier (married 1951)
- Children: Danielle, Paul, Richard
- Awards: Bronze Star Medal, 1964

He was promoted to Lieutenant Commander in 1954 and was commanding officer of the USS Vammen from 1959 to 1960; the Vammen was used in the 1959 Jerry Lewis movie "Don't Give Up the Ship." He was promoted to the rank of Commander in 1960. From 1960 to 1962, he was stationed at the Western Sea Frontier, headquartered on San Francisco's Treasure Island. From 1962 to 1964, Ogier was commanding officer of the USS Maddox, and was awarded the Bronze Star Medal for his successful command of the ship in the Gulf of Tonkin incident. From 1966 to 1970, he was an Executive Officer and Senior Instructor at the Naval ROTC at Rice University. He retired from the Navy in 1970 with 26 years of active duty.
