= Andrew Grindeland =

American politician

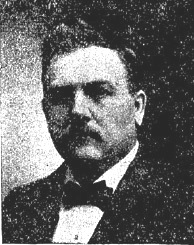
- Grindeland c. 1915

Member of the Minnesota Senate from the 63rd district
- In office January 3, 1899 – January 5, 1903

Personal details
- Born: November 20, 1856 Highlandville, Iowa, U.S.
- Died: October 28, 1932 (aged 75) Warren, Minnesota, U.S.
- Cause of death: Heart attack
- Party: Republican
- Spouse: Inger Forde (m. 1882)
- Children: 7
- Parent(s): Ingebrit Grindeland; Lucie Halstensdattir
- Education: Decorah Institute; University of Iowa College of Law
- Profession: Politician, lawyer, judge

Andrew Grindeland (November 20, 1856 – October 28, 1932) was an American lawyer, judge and Minnesota state senator.

Andrew Grindeland was born in Highlandville, Iowa. He was the son of Ingebrit Grindeland and Lucie Halstensdattir, both immigrants from Norway. He educated at the Decorah Institute in Decorah, Iowa. He graduated from the University of Iowa College of Law in 1882. He opened a law practice that year in the frontier town of Warren, Minnesota. He served on the city council and as city recorder. He drafted the Warren city charter. He engaged in the real estate firm of Grindeland & Forsberg. From 1889 to 1900, he was probate judge of Marshall County, Minnesota. He served one term in the Minnesota Senate from 1899 to 1903, giving up his seat to unsuccessfully seek the Republican nomination to the U.S. House of Representatives. In 1902, he took on as an associate Julius J. Olson, who late became a Minnesota Supreme Court justice. In March 1903, Governor Samuel Van Sant appointed him to the district court bench. He was elected in 1904, and re-elected in 1910, 1916, 1922, and 1928. He retired on November 26, 1930.

Grindeland married Inger Forde of Big Canoe in Winneshiek County, Iowa in 1882. They had one son and six daughters. His granddaughter Katherine married Oscar R. Knutson, chief justice of Minnesota, in 1968. In addition to his judicial work, he served on the boards of the Norwegian Lutheran Church of America, St. Olaf College, Luther College in Decorah and Grand Forks College in Grand Forks, North Dakota. While on the bench, he served as president of the Warren Commercial Club. He died in Warren on October 28, 1932, of a heart attack. His papers are reposited at the Minnesota Historical Society.
