= USS Maddox =

USS Maddox may refer to:

- USS Maddox (DD-168), christened in 1918, the ship was transferred to the Royal Navy, then Soviet Navy, and finally given back to the Royal Navy
- USS Maddox (DD-622), christened in 1942 and sunk the next year by a German bomber
- USS Maddox (DD-731), christened in 1944. After a short career in World War II and participation in the Korean War. This warship was involved in the Vietnam War's Gulf of Tonkin Incident, which led to direct open warfare between the nation of North Vietnam and the United States on 7 August 1964 (Tonkin Gulf Resolution).

== See also ==
- USS Maddox incident
