= Charles H. Warren =

Charles H. Warren may refer to:

- Charles Howard Warren (1856-1935), US railroad and insurance executive
- Charles Hyde Warren (1876—1950), US geologist.
- Charles H. Warren, President of the Massachusetts Senate in 1853
