= Oscar Knutson =

American judge

Oscar R. Knutson (October 9, 1899 – June 15, 1981) was an American lawyer and judge from Minnesota. He was the chief justice of Minnesota from 1962 until 1973.

== Early life and education ==
Oscar Rudolph Knutson was born in Superior, Wisconsin. He was the son of Bottolf Knutson (1865-1940) and Rachel (Satren) Knutson (1864-1929), both of whom were immigrants from Norway. The son of immigrant parents, he did not learn to speak English until he entered school. He graduated from Warren, Minnesota High School in 1920 and attended St. Olaf College and the Northwestern School of Agriculture (now University of Minnesota Crookston), graduating from the University of Minnesota Law School in 1927.

== Career ==
Knutson practiced law in Warren with Julius J. Olson, who also became a Minnesota Supreme Court justice.

Knutson ran unsuccessfully for Marshall County Attorney in 1930. He was elected mayor of Warren, Minnesota in 1936 and was re-elected twice. While mayor of Warren, Knutson and two partners purchased the Warren Telephone Company, which they operated until 1949. He was appointed a district court judge in 1941 by Governor Harold Stassen. He won election to the post in 1942. On May 7, 1948, he was appointed to the Minnesota Supreme Court by Governor Luther Youngdahl, succeeding Olson. He won election later that year and was re-elected in 1954 and 1960. On January 25, 1962, he was appointed Chief Justice by Governor Elmer L. Andersen and was elected in 1964 and re-elected in 1970. In 1962, he received the Alumni Award from St Olaf College. He retired in 1973.

== Later life and death ==
After retiring from the Court, Knutson lost his eyesight as a result of a stroke. He died during 1981. He was buried at Greenwood Cemetery at Warren in Marshall County, Minnesota.

== Personal life ==
Knutson married Louise Halvorson (1897-1955) in 1934. They had four children, Richard, Robert, Harold, and Anne. After Louise died, Knutson married Katherine Mellby Anderson in 1968. She was the granddaughter of Judge Andrew Grindeland of Warren, MN.

== Other sources ==
- Chief Justice Oscar Knutson Obituary Star Tribune, Published June 17, 1981
