= Julius J. Olson =

American judge

Julius J. Olson, 1934

Julius J. Olson (February 22, 1875 – May 22, 1955) was a lawyer and justice of the Minnesota Supreme Court.

== Biography ==
Julius Olson as a young lawyer in Warren, Minn. c. 1905.

Julius Johann Olson was born on the island of Dønna in Nordland county, Norway. He emigrated to Lake Park, Minnesota at age eight. He graduated from Detroit Lakes, Minnesota High School in 1897 and from the University of Minnesota Law School in 1900. He practiced law in Warren, Minnesota with Andrew Grindeland, who was appointed a district court judge in 1903. In 1916, he served as a delegate from Minnesota to Democratic National Convention. In 1927, Olson took on as an associate Oscar Knutson, who eventually succeeded him both as a district court judge and on the Minnesota Supreme Court.

Upon Grindeland's retirement in 1930, Governor Theodore Christianson appointed Olson to replace him. Olson was elected to the post in 1930. On March 5, 1934, Governor Floyd B. Olson appointed Olson to the Minnesota Supreme Court. He was elected to the position later that year and re-elected in 1940 and 1946. In 1948, Olson retired from the court and was replaced by Knutson. Olson was the founder and first secretary of the Marshall County Agricultural Association.

He was married on July 14, 1909 in Becker County, Minnesota to the former Caroline L. Sletten. Two of their adult children both became lawyers. A third child, Julius Johan Olson, died at age four.

== Other sources ==
- Knutson, Oscar, Justice, "Proceedings In Memory Of Chief Justice Samuel B. Wilson And Associate Justices Clifford L. Hilton, Julius J. Olson, And Theodore Christianson", Minnesota Supreme Court, May 15, 1956, Minnesota Reports, volume 246.
- Melgard, Lloyd George, ed., Warren Plains to Plenty: A History of 75 Eventful Years. Warren, Minn.: Warren Sheaf, 1956.
