= John J. Herrick =

United States Navy officer

John Jerome Herrick
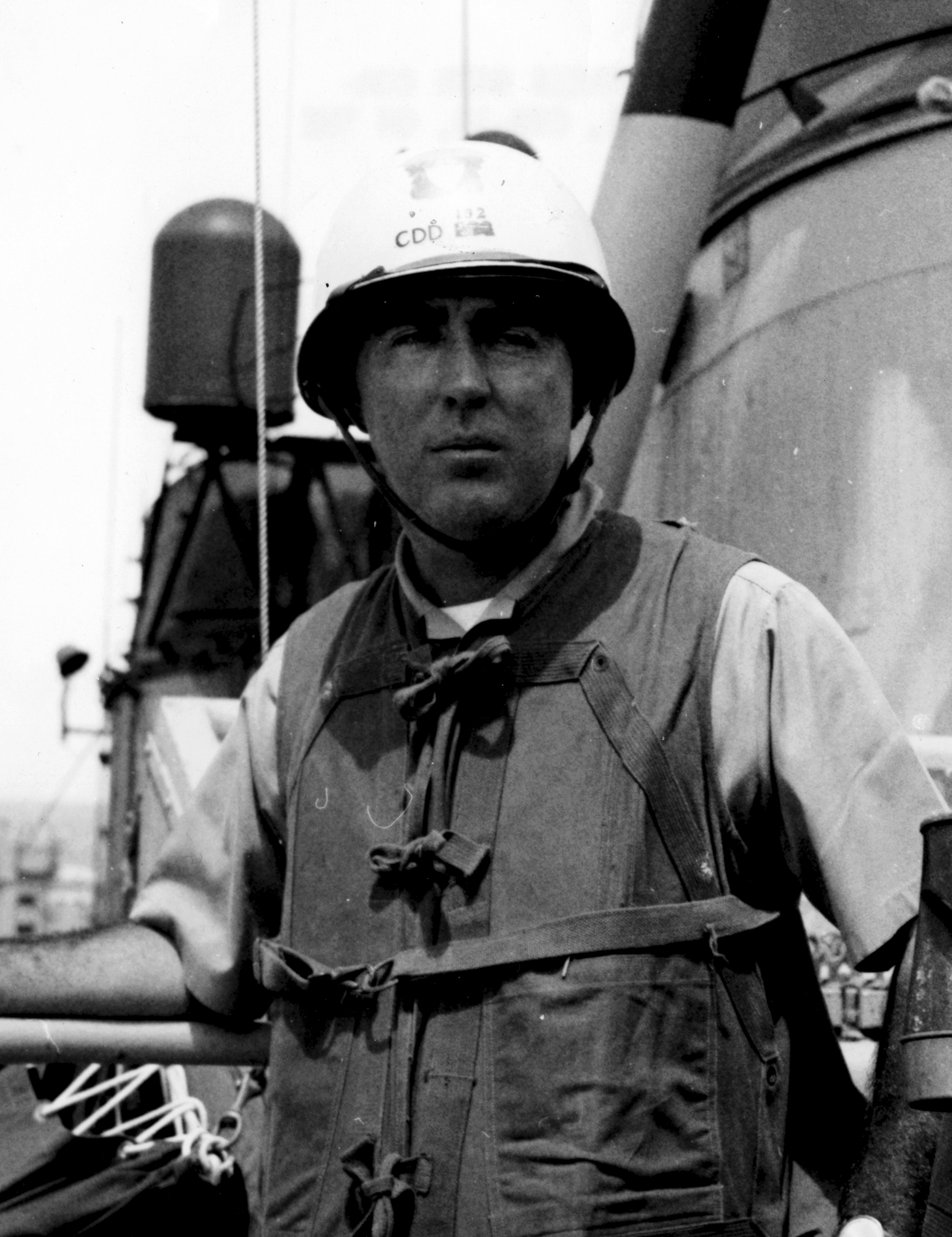
- Herrick aboard the USS Maddox, 1964.
- Born: June 23, 1920; Warren, Minnesota
- Died: August 2, 1997 (aged 77)
- Buried: Santa Fe National Cemetery, New Mexico
- Allegiance: United States
- Branch: United States Navy
- Rank: Captain
- Commands: Naval Ammunition Depot Portsmouth; Destroyer Division 192; USS Edson; USS Fechteler; USS Hanna; LSMR 412
- Conflicts: Gulf of Tonkin Incident
- Education: United States Naval Academy
- Spouse: Geraldine Kane (m. 1948)
- Children: 4

Captain John Jerome Herrick, USN (June 23, 1920 – August 2, 1997) was an officer in the United States Navy who was Commander of Destroyer Division 192 embarked aboard the USS Maddox (DD 731) during the Gulf of Tonkin Incident in August 1964. As the destroyer division commodore and Officer in Tactical Command, Herrick gave the order to return fire on three North Vietnamese patrol boats.

In 2005, however, an internal National Security Agency historical study was declassified; it concluded that Maddox had engaged the North Vietnamese Navy on August 2. The report stated, regarding the first incident on August 2, that "at 1500G, Captain Herrick ordered Ogier's [then-Commanding Officer of USS Maddox, Commander Herbert Ogier, USN] gun crews to open fire if the boats approached within ten thousand yards. At approximately 1505G, Maddox fired three rounds to warn off the communist boats. This initial action was never reported by the Johnson administration, which insisted that the Vietnamese boats fired first."

Herrick was born in Warren, Minnesota, son of James Orival Herrick and Lillian (Cowley) Herrick, where his father was depot agent for the Soo Line Railroad. He attended University of Wisconsin - Superior before entering the United States Naval Academy. At the academy, his nickname was Jiglig. On May 1, 1948, in La Jolla, California, he married Geraldine Kane (1921-2003), the daughter of a retired Navy dentist. They had three sons and a daughter. He was the commanding officer of a landing ship (medium rockets) during the Korean War and a destroyer escort and two destroyers during the Cold War. After his commodore tour, he was the commanding officer of Naval Ammunition Depot Portsmouth in Portsmouth, Virginia.

Herrick died in 1997 and was buried at Santa Fe National Cemetery in New Mexico.

Herrick's older brother, Curtis J. Herrick (1909-1971, USMA 1931), was a general in the United States Army.
