= Warren Municipal Airport (Minnesota) =

- IATA: none; ICAO: none; FAA LID: D37

Summary
- Airport type: Public
- Owner: City of Warren
- Serves: Warren, Minnesota
- Elevation AMSL: 888 ft / 271 m
- Coordinates: 48°11′28″N 096°42′41″W

Map
- Location of airport in Minnesota D37 (the United States)

Runways
Direction	Length		Surface
Direction	ft	m	Surface
12/30	3,199	975	Asphalt
4/22	2,578	786	Turf

Statistics (2010)
- Aircraft operations: 19,000
- Based aircraft: 6
- Source: Federal Aviation Administration

Warren Municipal Airport (FAA LID: D37) is a city-owned, public-use airport located two nautical miles (4 km) east of the central business district of Warren, a city in Marshall County, Minnesota, United States.

== Facilities and aircraft ==
The Warren City Council voted to build an airport in 1965 for an estimated cost of $109,000. A dedication ceremony took place in August 1966.

Warren Municipal Airport covers an area of 167 acres (68 ha) at an elevation of 888 feet (271 m) above mean sea level. It has two runways: 12/30 is 3,199 by 75 feet (975 x 23 m) with an asphalt surface and 4/22 is 2,578 by 200 feet (786 x 61 m) with a turf surface.

For the 12-month period ending August 25, 2010, the airport had 19,000 general aviation aircraft operations, an average of 52 per day. At that time there were six aircraft based at this airport, all single-engine. General aviation traffic is from agricultural aircraft during the summer growing season, and from training activity from the University of North Dakota.

== See also ==
- List of airports in Minnesota
