= Warren, Minnesota =

City in Minnesota, United States

Warren
- City
- Motto: "Soaring To A Bright Future"
- Location within Marshall County and Minnesota
- Coordinates: 48°11′48″N 96°46′22″W
- Country: United States
- State: Minnesota
- County: Marshall
- Founded: 1879
- Incorporated (town): 1881
- Incorporated (city): 1892

Government
  - Mayor: Travis Carl
  - Council: Justin Buegler; David Erickson; Danny Omdahl; Jarod Peterson; David Weber; Mark Wimpfheimer

Area
  - Total: 1.46 sq mi (3.77 km^{2})
  - Land: 1.46 sq mi (3.77 km^{2})
  - Water: 0 sq mi (0.00 km^{2})
- Elevation: 856 ft (261 m)

Population (2020)
  - Total: 1,605
  - Estimate (2021): 1,574
  - Density: 1,102.1/sq mi (425.53/km^{2})
- Time zone: UTC-6 (CST)
  - Summer (DST): UTC-5 (CDT)
- ZIP code: 56762
- Area code: 218
- FIPS code: 27-68170
- GNIS feature ID: 0653783
- Website: warrenminnesota.com

Warren is a city in and the county seat of Marshall County, Minnesota, United States. The population was 1,605 at the 2020 census.

== History ==
Warren was platted in 1879, and named for Charles H. Warren, a railroad official. A post office has been in operation at Warren since 1880.

Although several times larger than the next largest city in the county, Warren's prominence as the county seat has been threatened several times in its history. The original plan for the Soo Line Railroad (completed in 1905) branch line that passes through Warren called for it to run from Thief River Falls to Argyle and then west. Argyle interests hoped the establishment of a railroad junction there would lead to the removal of the county seat from Warren to Argyle. Other interests prevailed, although the railroad line forms a parabola extending north from Thief River Falls, and then south to Warren, as if the plan changed while the line was being built. In 1974, citizens of the eastern part of the county, noting Warren's location in the western quarter of the long county, and very nearly at its southern boundary, petitioned twice for the relocation of the county seat to Newfolden. Neither effort that year resulted in the question being put on the ballot, and in fact, voters in the interim had approved the construction of an addition to the courthouse in Warren.

Warren was featured on a 2006 episode of the History Channel's UFO Files episode "Alien Encounters." The unsolved case of a mysterious object impacting a county sheriff's car on August 27, 1979, was featured (see Val Johnson Incident). This same case was also featured in 2012 on the Travel Channel's Mysteries at the Museum episode "MGM Fire; UFO Car, Prophecy Sword"

== Geography ==
According to the United States Census Bureau, the city has a total area of 1.44 square miles (3.73 km^{2}), all land. The Snake River flows in serpentine fashion through the city (hence its name), and both banks are developed, which has proved problematic as the city attempts flood control. Some major floods in the city's history took place in 1896 (twice), 1969, 1974, 1979, 1996 (twice), and 1997.

The streets of the original townsite of Warren are laid out on a grid parallel and perpendicular to the Burlington Northern Santa Fe Railroad. Some newer additions, particularly those south of Bridge Street (Minnesota Highway 1) are laid out on a conventional north–south grid. The BNSF is the dividing line for the street system east and west, and Bridge Street is the dividing line north and south.

U.S. Highway 75 and Minnesota State Highway 1 are two of the main routes in the city.

=== Climate ===
Climate data for Warren, Minnesota, 1991–2020 normals
Month	Jan	Feb	Mar	Apr	May	Jun	Jul	Aug	Sep	Oct	Nov	Dec	Year
Mean daily maximum °F (°C)	13.6 (−10.2)	18.5 (−7.5)	33.8 (1.0)	51.2 (10.7)	66.7 (19.3)	75.7 (24.3)	80.6 (27.0)	79.7 (26.5)	70.0 (21.1)	53.8 (12.1)	35.6 (2.0)	21.0 (−6.1)	50.0 (10.0)
Daily mean °F (°C)	3.5 (−15.8)	7.1 (−13.8)	22.4 (−5.3)	40.1 (4.5)	54.8 (12.7)	65.0 (18.3)	69.5 (20.8)	67.6 (19.8)	58.0 (14.4)	43.2 (6.2)	26.5 (−3.1)	12.0 (−11.1)	39.1 (4.0)
Mean daily minimum °F (°C)	−6.7 (−21.5)	−4.4 (−20.2)	11.0 (−11.7)	29.0 (−1.7)	42.9 (6.1)	54.3 (12.4)	58.4 (14.7)	55.5 (13.1)	46.0 (7.8)	32.6 (0.3)	17.4 (−8.1)	2.9 (−16.2)	28.2 (−2.1)
Source: NOAA

== Demographics ==
Historical population
Census	Pop.	Note	%±
1880	108		—
1890	648		500.0%
1900	1,276		96.9%
1910	1,813		42.1%
1920	1,772		−2.3%
1930	1,472		−16.9%
1940	1,839		24.9%
1950	1,779		−3.3%
1960	2,007		12.8%
1970	1,999		−0.4%
1980	2,105		5.3%
1990	1,813		−13.9%
2000	1,678		−7.4%
2010	1,563		−6.9%
2020	1,605		2.7%
2021 (est.)	1,574		−1.9%
U.S. Decennial Census; 2020 Census

=== 2020 census ===
As of the 2020 census, Warren had a population of 1,605. The median age was 39.3 years. 24.9% of residents were under the age of 18 and 20.2% of residents were 65 years of age or older. For every 100 females there were 87.9 males, and for every 100 females age 18 and over there were 84.8 males age 18 and over.

0.0% of residents lived in urban areas, while 100.0% lived in rural areas.

There were 685 households in Warren, of which 26.7% had children under the age of 18 living in them. Of all households, 45.3% were married-couple households, 18.2% were households with a male householder and no spouse or partner present, and 29.1% were households with a female householder and no spouse or partner present. About 35.6% of all households were made up of individuals and 15.2% had someone living alone who was 65 years of age or older.

There were 750 housing units, of which 8.7% were vacant. The homeowner vacancy rate was 0.6% and the rental vacancy rate was 10.9%.

Racial composition as of the 2020 census
Race	Number	Percent
White	1,489	92.8%
Black or African American	5	0.3%
American Indian and Alaska Native	14	0.9%
Asian	4	0.2%
Native Hawaiian and Other Pacific Islander	0	0.0%
Some other race	35	2.2%
Two or more races	58	3.6%
Hispanic or Latino (of any race)	97	6.0%

=== 2010 census ===
As of the census of 2010, the city had 1,563 people, 681 households, and 743 families. The population density was 1,085.4 inhabitants per square mile (419.1/km^{2}). The 743 housing units were at an average density of 516.0 per square mile (199.2/km^{2}). The racial makeup of the city was 97.2% White, 0.4% African American, 0.3% Native American, 0.3% Asian, 1.2% from other races, and 0.5% from two or more races. Hispanic or Latino of any race were 2.6% of the population.

Of the 681 households, 27.8% had children under 18 years, 46.1% were married couples living together, 10.7% had a female householder with no husband present, 4.6% had a male householder with no wife present, and 38.6% were non-families. 35.7% of all households were made up of individuals, and 18.5% had someone living alone who was 65 years or older. The average household size was 2.20 and the average family size was 2.82.

The median age in the city was 44.5 years. 23.2% of residents were under the age of 18; 6.3% were between the ages of 18 and 24; 21.2% were from 25 to 44; 25.7% were from 45 to 64; and 23.5% were 65 years of age or older. The gender makeup of the city was 47.5% male and 52.5% female.

=== 2000 census ===
As of the 2000 census, 1,678 people, 699 households, and 432 families were in the city. The population density was 1,174.1 inhabitants per square mile (453.3/km^{2}). The city had 785 housing units at an average density of 549.3 per square mile (212.1/km^{2}). The racial makeup of the city was 98.27% White, 0.12% African American, 0.24% Native American, 0.06% Asian, 1.01% from other races, and 0.30% from two or more races. Hispanic or Latino of any race were 2.62% of the population.

Of the 699 households, 28.8% had children under 18 years, 49.6% were married couples living together, 9.9% had a female householder with no husband present, and 38.1% were non-families. 35.9% of all households were made up of individuals, and 20.6% had someone living alone who was 65 years of age or older. The average household size was 2.24 and the average family size was 2.90.

In the city, the population was spread out, with 23.4% under the age of 18, 6.6% from 18 to 24, 24.2% from 25 to 44, 21.1% from 45 to 64, and 24.7% who were 65 years of age or older. The median age was 42 years. For every 100 females, there were 88.1 males. For every 100 females age 18 and over, there were 83.0 males.

The median income for a household in the city was $36,250 and the median income for a family was $45,063. Males had a median income of $32,216 versus $20,625 for females. The per capita income for the city was $17,547. About 6.5% of families and 10.2% of the population were below the poverty line, including 11.5% of those under age 18 and 10.6% of those age 65 or over.

=== Religion ===
The city has three Lutheran churches (two affiliated with the Evangelical Lutheran Church in America and one affiliated with the Lutheran Church–Missouri Synod), a Roman Catholic parish and cemetery, an Evangelical Covenant church, a United Methodist church, and an Assembly of God church, as well as a non-denominational church. At the local community center, a sect of scientologists have been discussing plans to add a worship space. In the rural area surrounding the city, there are three small Lutheran churches.

== Economy ==
Agriculture and agribusiness have been the mainstays of Warren throughout its history. In fact, for most of its history, there has been no other industry at all. Although the Red River Valley has a short growing season, which is often made even shorter due to floods, the area has excellent crop yields which help make farming in the area less risky than in other areas with poorer soil. The principal crops are wheat, soybeans, potatoes, and sugar beets. Warren was at one time home to the largest independent elevator in Minnesota. Northwest Grain Cenex Harvest States Cooperative has a large elevator on the Soo Line, and the American Crystal Sugar Co. operates a sugar beet terminal just north of Warren during harvest. Warren has three bank branches, the largest being a branch of Community Bank of the Red River Valley, headquartered in East Grand Forks.

== Education and culture ==
Warren is home of the Warren-Alvarado-Oslo school district. The district has one six-year high school and one elementary school, both located in Warren. Both buildings have been called superior facilities for a district its size. The high school, built in 1954, includes a 1000-seat auditorium. The elementary school, built in 1970, was originally an "open school" design where the classrooms were separated by chalkboard partitions rather than walls, although a few walls were installed in 1987. In the late 2000s, the school board went on to add on a new gymnasium.

Warren has a public library, the Godel Memorial Library, and is home to the Marshall County Historical Society, the Marshall County Fair, and the Warren Riverside Country Club (9-hole, par 4, grass greens).

== Transportation ==
The Warren City Council voted to build an airport in 1965 for an estimated cost of $109,000. A dedication ceremony took place in August 1966.

== Notable people ==
Some notable people who have lived in Warren:

- Carl Panzram – Serial killer
- Julius J. Olson – Minnesota Supreme Court justice and chief justice
- Oscar Knutson – Minnesota Supreme Court chief justice and mayor
- John J. Herrick – captain who led the craft fired upon in the Gulf of Tonkin incident
- Gerome Kamrowski – Abstract Artist
- Ervin J. Rokke - Lieutenant General, U.S. Air Force; Dean of the Faculty, U.S. Air Force Academy; president of National Defense University; president of Moravian College
- Joseph Steffan – civil rights activist
- Paul Nelson – magazine editor and musician
- Val Johnson – former sheriff's deputy known for his UFO encounter
