= USS Maddox (DD-622) =

Gleaves-class destroyer

Coordinates: 36°52′N 13°56′E

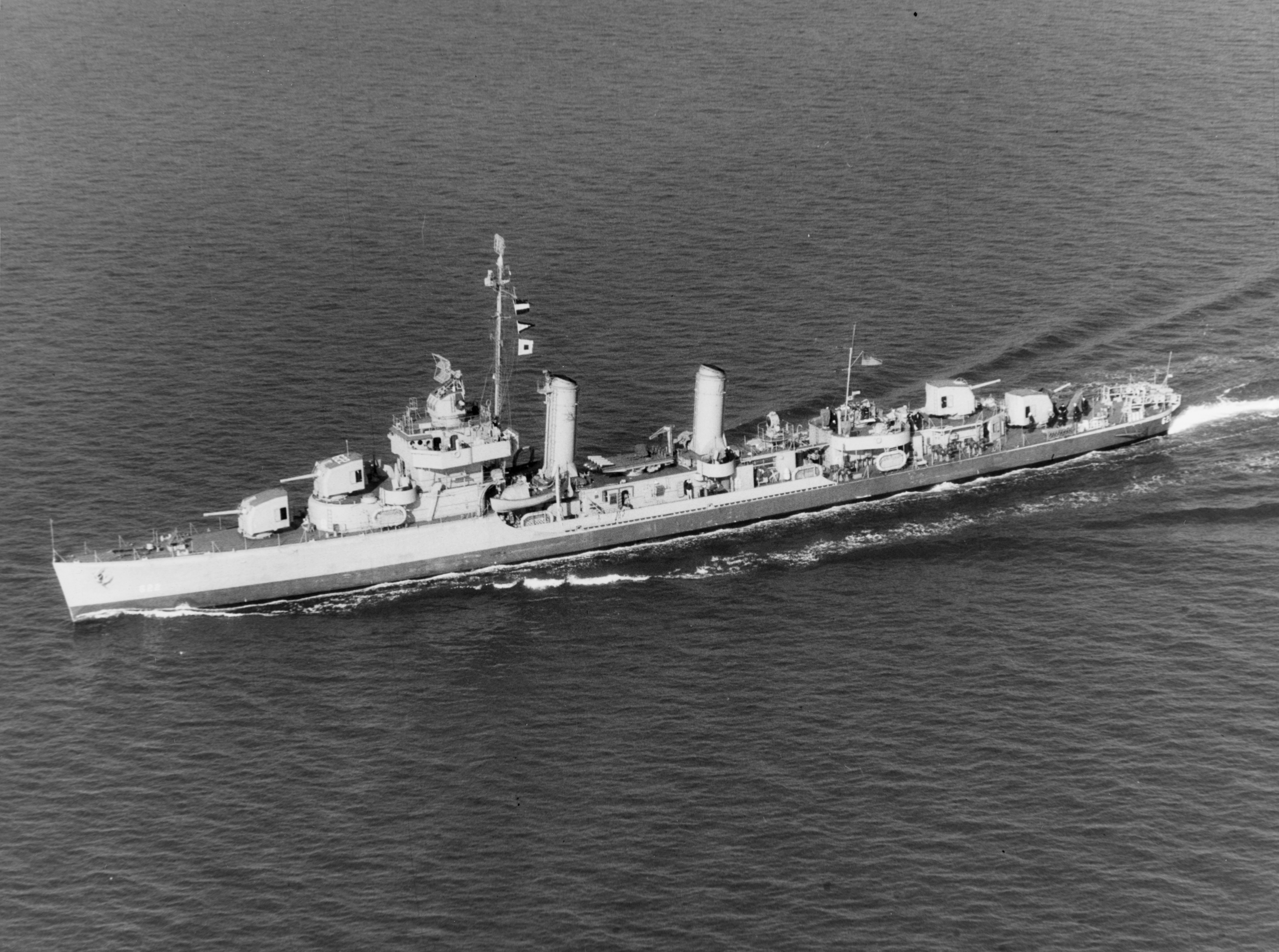
- USS Maddox (DD-622) underway at sea on 17 November 1942

History

United States
- Name: Maddox
- Namesake: William Maddox
- Builder: Federal Shipbuilding and Drydock Company
- Laid down: 7 May 1942
- Launched: 15 September 1942
- Commissioned: 31 October 1942
- Fate: Sunk by Italian air attack, 10 July 1943
- Stricken: 19 August 1943

General characteristics
- Class & type: Gleaves-class destroyer
- Displacement: 1,630 tons
- Length: 348 ft 3 in (106.15 m)
- Beam: 36 ft 1 in (11.00 m)
- Draft: 11 ft 10 in (3.61 m)
- Propulsion: 50,000 shp (37,000 kW); 4 boilers; 2 propellers
- Speed: 37.4 knots (69 km/h)
- Range: 6,500 nmi (12,000 km; 7,500 mi) at 12 kn (22 km/h; 14 mph)
- Complement: 16 officers, 260 enlisted
- Armament: 4 × 5 in (127 mm)/38 caliber DP guns; 6 × 0.50 in (12.7 mm) machine guns; 2 × twin 40 mm (1.6 in) AA guns; 5 × 20 mm (0.79 in) AA guns, 5 × 21 in (533 mm) torpedo tubes (5 Mark 15 torpedoes); 6 × depth charge projectors, 2 × depth charge tracks

USS Maddox (DD-622), a Gleaves-class destroyer, was the second ship of the United States Navy to be named after United States Marine Corps Captain William A. T. Maddox, who served in the Mexican–American War.

Maddox was laid down on 7 May 1942 by the Federal Shipbuilding & Dry Dock Company, Kearny, New Jersey and launched on 15 September 1942; sponsored by Mrs. Ellen-Venita Browning Wilhoit Gay, great-granddaughter of Captain Maddox. The ship was commissioned on 31 October 1942, Lieutenant Commander Eugene S. Sarsfield in command.

== Service history ==
After shakedown, Maddox departed New York on 2 January 1943 for Norfolk, Virginia where she commenced escort duties. Following her first two convoy missions, safeguarding fleet oilers plying between Norfolk and the petroleum centers of Galveston, Texas and Aruba, Maddox began a series of trans-Atlantic voyages escorting convoys from New York and Norfolk to North Africa.

On 8 June 1943, Maddox departed Norfolk for Oran, Algeria, where she became a unit of Task Force 81 (TF 81), the assault force for the Sicilian invasion. As the assault troops opened the amphibious Battle of Gela on 10 July, Maddox was on antisubmarine patrol about 16 miles offshore. Steaming alone, the destroyer was attacked by a German Junkers Ju 88 bomber of KG 54, and a squadron Italian Ju 87 of the Regia Aeronautica . One of the bombs exploded Maddox's aft magazine, causing the ship to roll over and sink within two minutes. Lieutenant Commander Sarsfield was posthumously awarded the Navy Cross for heroism displayed in supervising abandon ship. His action was responsible for saving the lives of 74 of the crew of 284.

Among the lost was 16 year old S2 Charles Levin Young, one of the youngest sailors to die in US service in World War 2.

Maddox was struck from the Navy list 19 August 1943. She received two battle stars for World War II service.
