= Ervin J. Rokke =

United States Air Force general (1939–2025)

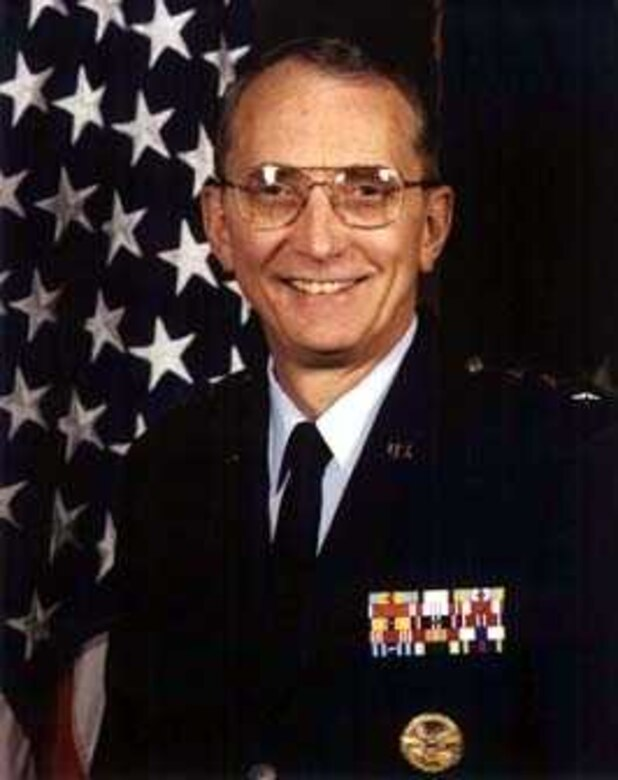
- Born: December 12, 1939; Warren, Minnesota, U.S.
- Died: September 5, 2025 (aged 85) Colorado Springs, U.S.
- Allegiance: United States of America
- Branch: United States Air Force
- Service years: 1962–1997
- Rank: Lieutenant general
- Commands: National Defense University

Ervin J. Rokke (December 12, 1939 – September 5, 2025) was a lieutenant general and President of Moravian College. He was a United States Air Force lieutenant general and president of the National Defense University. He graduated from United States Air Force Academy (BS) and Harvard University (MA, PhD). During the 1980s, as a Brigadier General in the United States Air Force, General Rokke served as the Dean of Faculty at the United States Air Force Academy. He completed his time at Moravian College in the summer of 2006; at the commencement ceremonies that year, he received an honorary doctorate from the college. Following retirement from Moravian, the Rokkes relocated to Monument, Colorado. Rokke died in Colorado Springs on September 5, 2025, at the age of 85.
