= William A. T. Maddox =

US Marine Corps officer (1814 – 1889)

William A.T. Maddox
- Born: 1814
- Died: 1889 (aged 74–75)
- Military career
- Allegiance: United States of America
- Branch: United States Marine Corps
- Rank: Second Lieutenant, Brevet Captain
- Conflicts: Indian Wars; Mexican–American War

William A. T. Maddox (1814 – January 1, 1889) was an officer in the United States Marine Corps.

Born in Charles County, Maryland, in 1814, commanded a volunteer company in the Creek and Seminole Wars in 1836, and was appointed 2nd lieutenant in the Marine Corps on October 14, 1837.

On September 12, 1846, while serving in the Mexican–American War, Lieutenant Maddox was appointed by Commodore Robert F. Stockton (commander of all US forces in California at the time) to be Military Commandant of the Middle District of California (one of three districts set up by Stockton).

The next year, he was breveted captain for "gallant and meritorious conduct" during a Mexican uprising at Monterey and during the Battle of Santa Clara, California, January 3, 1847. Monterey was within the Middle District, while Santa Clara was in the Northern District.

Captain Maddox retired in 1880 and died in Washington, D.C.

== Namesake ==
Three ships, USS Maddox, have been named for him.
