= USS Maddox (DD-731) =

Allen M. Sumner-class destroyer

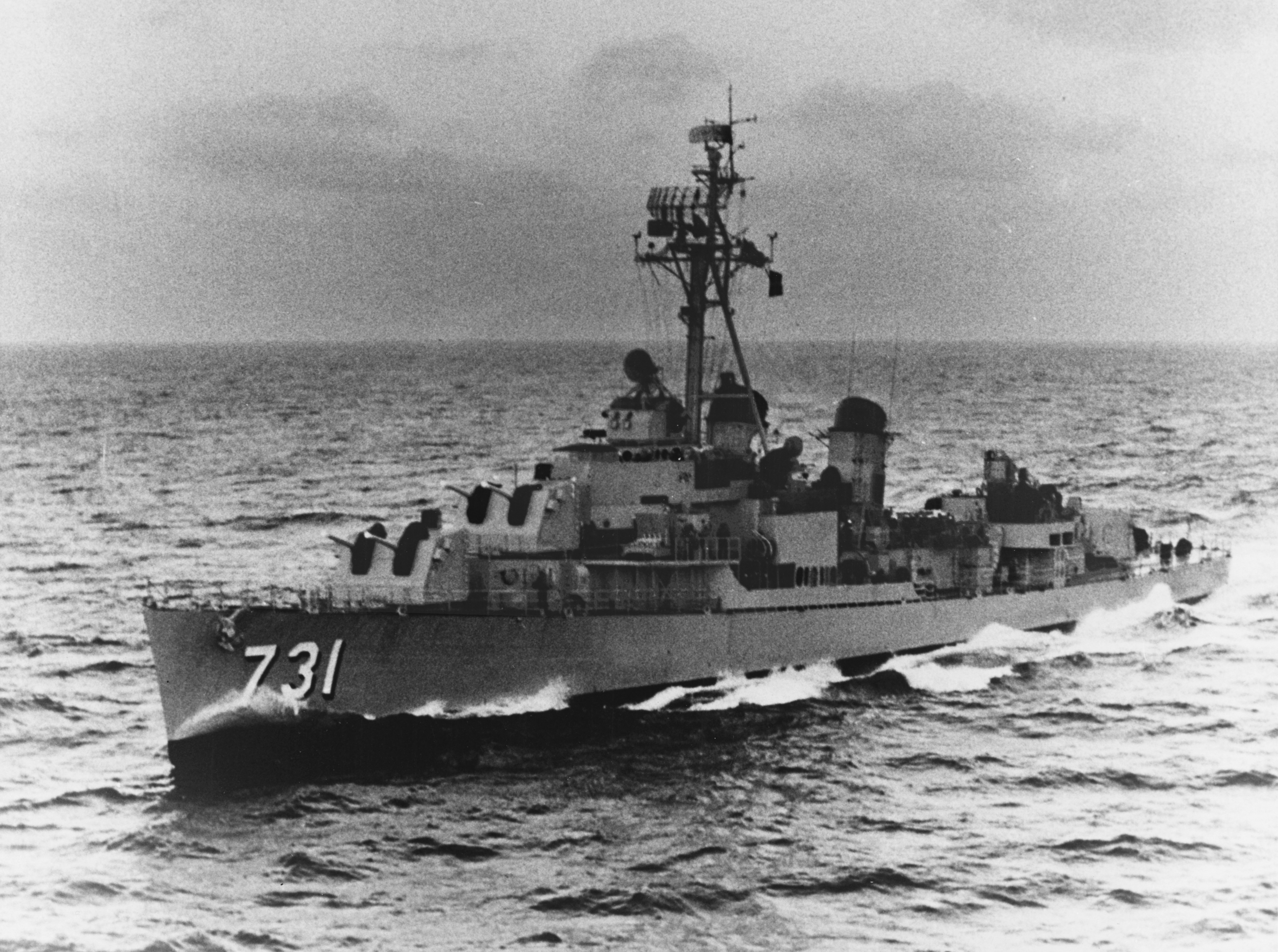
- USS Maddox underway in the early 1960s

History

United States
- Name: Maddox
- Namesake: William A. T. Maddox
- Builder: Bath Iron Works
- Laid down: 28 October 1943
- Launched: 19 March 1944
- Sponsored by: Mrs. Harry H. Wilhoit
- Commissioned: 2 June 1944
- Decommissioned: 1972
- Stricken: 2 July 1972
- Identification: Callsign: NHHK; Hull number: DD-731
- Fate: Sold to Taiwan in 1973
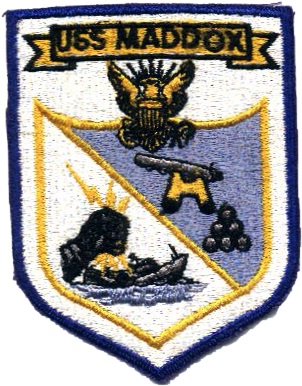
- Badge

Taiwan
- Name: Po Yang; (鄱陽)
- Namesake: Po Yang
- Acquired: 6 July 1972
- Commissioned: 6 July 1972
- Identification: Hull number: DD-10
- Reclassified: DD-928; DD-910, 1979; DDG-910, mid-1980s
- Decommissioned: 30 June 1984
- Stricken: 1985
- Fate: Scrapped, 1985

General characteristics
- Class & type: Allen M. Sumner-class destroyer
- Displacement: 2,200 tons
- Length: 376 ft 6 in (114.76 m)
- Beam: 40 ft (12 m)
- Draft: 15 ft 8 in (4.78 m)
- Propulsion: 60,000 shp (45,000 kW); 2 propellers
- Speed: 34 kn (63 km/h; 39 mph)
- Range: 6,500 nmi (12,000 km; 7,500 mi) at 15 kn (28 km/h; 17 mph)
- Complement: 336 officers and men
- Armament: 6 × 5 in (127 mm)/38 cal. guns; 12 × 40 mm AA guns, 11 × 20 mm AA guns, 10 × 21 inch (533 mm) torpedo tubes, 6 × depth charge projectors, 2 × depth charge tracks

USS Maddox (DD-731), was an Allen M. Sumner-class destroyer. She was named after Captain William A. T. Maddox of the United States Marine Corps.

Maddox screened the ships of the Fast Carrier Task Force during strikes against Japanese targets in the western Pacific. She was hit by a Japanese kamikaze aircraft off Formosa on 21 January 1945. Later, she covered the Marine landings at Okinawa and operated with the 7th Fleet in support of United Nations Forces during the Korean War. Maddox participated in the Blockade of Wonsan, an 861-day siege and bombardment of the city.

After 1953, she alternated operations along the west coast of the United States and in Hawaiian waters, with regular deployments to the western Pacific with the Seventh Fleet. Maddox departed Long Beach 13 March 1964. At first steaming with fast carrier groups in the Sea of Japan and the East China Sea, she headed south 18 May and established patrol off the coast of South Vietnam. During August she was involved in a skirmish with North Vietnamese torpedo boats, the Gulf of Tonkin incident, which led to the Gulf of Tonkin Resolution and increased U.S. involvement in the Vietnam War.

== Construction and career ==
She was laid down by the Bath Iron Works Corporation at Bath in Maine on 28 October 1943, launched on 19 March 1944 by Mrs. Harry H. Wilhoit, granddaughter of Captain Maddox, and commissioned on 2 June 1944.

=== Service in the United States Navy ===
==== World War II ====
Following shakedown and antisubmarine exercises, Maddox departed Boston on 27 August for Norfolk, Virginia on route to the Pacific. Arriving at Ulithi 21 October 1944, she was assigned to Fast Carrier TG 38.1 of the 3rd Fleet. As a member of this task group, Maddox took part in the preparation and the covering operations for the Mindoro and Luzon invasions, 4 November 1944 to 21 January 1945. During this period she served in the screen and on picket station in the South and East China Seas, while carrier-based planes struck air and naval bases from Saigon to Formosa. Hit by a kamikaze off Formosa on 21 January 1945, Maddox headed for Ulithi for repairs. Departing on 14 March, the destroyer steamed off the Japanese home islands where she was on picket station during the air strikes on Kyushu and southern Honshu. She proceeded to Okinawa on 23 March to provide support for preinvasion strikes, remaining on duty there after the invasion date of 1 April. For almost three months, until 13 June 1945, Maddox continued to provide support for this campaign in the form of shore bombardment and carrier screening for raids on Kyushu and Shikoku.

On 8 July, Maddox sailed from Leyte to participate in the operations of the Third Fleet off the islands of Honshu and Hokkaido. From 10 July until the cessation of offensive action 15 August, she provided screening, picket, and shore bombardment services.

Following the Japanese surrender, Maddox continued to patrol off Japan until departing Tokyo Bay 20 September with military passengers for the United States. Delivering her passengers to San Francisco on 5 October, she proceeded to San Diego, arriving on the 14th. She operated there until 1 February 1946, when she returned to the Far East to support the movement of naval occupation forces between Shanghai, Qingdao, and Taku in China, and the ports of Pusan and Jinsen in Korea.

==== Korean War ====
Returning to San Diego 24 March 1947, she operated for the next three years off the west coast conducting reserve training cruises, serving as a training ship in antisubmarine warfare and gunnery and participating in maneuvers with the 1st Task Fleet.

On 1 May 1950, Maddox departed San Diego for the Far East, arriving Hong Kong 26 June, the day after the commencement of hostilities in Korea. Departing for South Korea the next day, she acted as plane guard and antisubmarine screen for the aircraft carriers USS Valley Forge and HMS Triumph. She operated there until August, when she departed for Formosa. On 4 May, she helped form the initial Formosa (later Taiwan) Patrol Force to prevent Communist Chinese invasion of Taiwan.

Maddox returned to Korea 7 September and assumed coastal blockade and bombardment duties. She continued this assignment, which included a diversionary bombardment of Samchok coordinated with the Inchon landings on 15 September, until departing for the United States early in January 1951. Arriving at San Diego on 31 January 1951, she served as a training ship and underwent overhaul before departing 1 December 1951 for her second Korean duty. Through February 1952, she screened carriers off the east coast of Korea and provided shore bombardment support for the U.N. land forces. During March she operated with the Taiwan Patrol Force, returning to Korea in April. From 16 April through 17 May she participated in the siege of Wonsan, following which she resumed screening duties for fast carriers.

In June Maddox returned to San Diego, arriving on 26 June, to stay only one month before departing for her new home port of Long Beach. After local operations and overhaul, Maddox again sailed for the Far East on 2 February 1953. As on her second Korean deployment, the destroyer again guarded the fast carriers along the eastern coast of Korea; participated in shore bombardments, this time as far north as Hungnam, and served, for a two-week period, in the Taiwan Patrol Force. After completing her 1953 Korean tour on 12 August she departed for Long Beach, arriving on 30 August.

==== 1954–1964 ====
Maddox operated off the west coast until the next spring. (Maddox is featured in the Hollywood film Return from the Sea, released by Allied Artists in 1954.) On 4 May 1954, she sailed for duty with the 7th Fleet. On this tour, which lasted until 5 December, she took part in antisubmarine warfare tactics and attack carrier exercises off Kyushu, Korea, and Luzon as well as operating with the Taiwan Patrol Force.

From 14 June 1955 through 2 March 1962, Maddox completed six additional cruises to the Far East. These cruises included combined defense exercises with the forces of other SEATO nations and training operations with South Korean, Nationalist Chinese, and Japanese Maritime Self-Defense Forces.

Having operated off the west coast for two years, from March 1962, Maddox departed Long Beach 13 March 1964 for another tour with the 7th Fleet. At first steaming with fast carrier groups in the Sea of Japan and the East China Sea, she headed south 18 May and established patrol off the coast of South Vietnam.

==== Gulf of Tonkin incident ====
On 31 July 1964 she commenced her first leg of a DESOTO patrol in the Tonkin Gulf. Initially a routine patrol, it later developed into a naval action with global repercussions. On 2 August 1964, Maddox, cruising in international waters 28 miles off the coast of North Vietnam, engaged three North Vietnamese Navy (NVN) P4 motor torpedo boats, from Torpedo Squadron 135. The P4s, 66-foot (20 m) long aluminum-hulled torpedo boats each armed with two torpedoes which mounted a 550 lb (250 kg) TNT warhead and capable of exceeding 40 knots (74 km/h; 46 mph), approached at high speeds from several miles away. The commander of the 7th Fleet's Destroyer Division 192, Captain John J. Herrick, who was aboard Maddox in charge of the mission, ordered the ship's captain (Commander Herbert Ogier) to have gun crews fire upon the torpedo boats if they came within 10,000 yards (9,100 m). When they did, the American sailors fired three rounds to warn off the North Vietnamese boats. The NVN torpedo boats were commanded by three brothers: Van Bot commanded boat T-333, Van Tu commanded T-336, and T-339 was commanded by Van Gian. The torpedo boats initially conducted their attack in numerical order, with T-333 spearheading the assault. Maximum effective range for their torpedoes was 1,000 yards (910 m), but Maddox's 5-inch gun's range was 18,000 yards (16,000 m). As the boats pressed home their attack and came within 5,000 yards (4,600 m), T-333 attempted to run abeam of Maddox for a side shot, while the remaining two boats continued their stern chase. The two chasers, T-336 and T-339, fired first, but due to Maddox's heavy fire of 5-inch shells, the torpedo boats had discharged their torpedoes at excessive range, all four underwater missiles missing their mark. T-333 fired its torpedoes, without effect, but dueled Maddox's 5-inch guns with its twin 14.5 mm (0.57 in) machine gun, achieving one hit on the destroyer. The ship altered her course to avoid the torpedoes, which were observed passing on the starboard side. Soon, four F-8 Crusaders from an aircraft carrier in the region, USS Ticonderoga, arrived on the scene and attacked the three torpedo boats. The combination of fire from Maddox and the F-8s severely damaged all three boats, and forced them to retreat to the bases from which they came. Several NVN sailors were wounded, and four were killed. No US sailors were killed or wounded, and Maddox did not sustain serious damage, save for a single bullet hole from a machine gun; one of the four Crusaders sustained some 14.5 mm machine gun fire hits, as a large portion of its left wing was "missing", but managed to return to Ticonderoga.

On 4 August, another DESOTO patrol off the North Vietnamese coast was launched by Maddox and USS Turner Joy, in order to "show the flag" after the first incident. This time their orders indicated that the ships were to close to no more than 11 miles (18 km) from the coast of North Vietnam. During an evening and early morning of rough weather and heavy seas, the destroyers received radar, sonar, and radio signals that they believed signaled another attack by the North Vietnamese navy. For some two hours the ships fired on radar targets and maneuvered vigorously amid electronic and visual reports of enemies. At 0127 Washington time, Herrick sent a cable in which he admitted that the attack may never have happened and that there may actually have been no North Vietnamese craft in the area: "Review of action makes many reported contacts and torpedoes fired appear doubtful. Freak weather effects on radar and overeager sonarmen may have accounted for many reports. No actual visual sightings by Maddox. Suggest complete evaluation before any further action taken." Since then, numerous accounts have supported the theory that there was no attack on 4 August at all, including North Vietnamese military commander Võ Nguyên Giáp, who in 1995 admitted 2 August attack but asserted that the 4 August attack had never occurred.

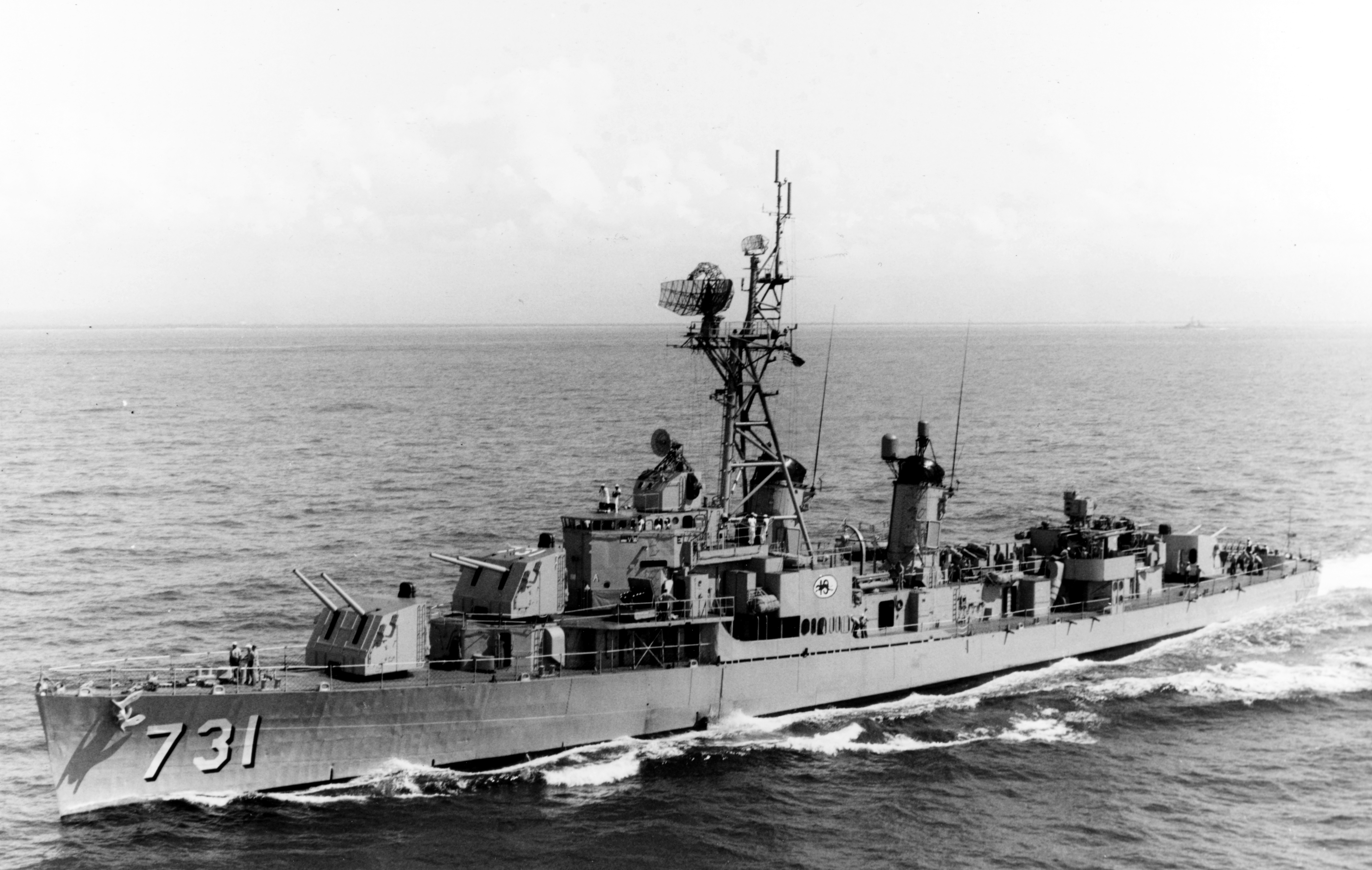
Maddox underway in 1964

==== Vietnam War ====
After arrival at Long Beach, Maddox remained in a leave and upkeep status until mid‑January 1965, then conducted training exercises and repairs in preparation for her next WestPac deployment. She departed Long Beach on 10 July and commenced operating with the fast carriers in the Gulf of Tonkin in early August. For the next four months, Maddox alternated duty with the carriers with gunfire support missions off the coast of South Vietnam. At the end of November she sailed for home, arriving at Long Beach 16 December.

After conducting upkeep and local exercises off the California coast, summer 1966 saw her engaged in a training cruise for midshipmen which included a trip to Pearl Harbor. Maddox departed California 20 November for another deployment with the 7th Fleet, sailing by way of Pearl Harbor, Midway, Guam, and Taiwan.

After a successful tour consisting primarily of providing gunfire support, interrupted by a visit to Singapore and a crossing of the Equator on 8 February 1967, Maddox departed Subic Bay, Philippine Islands, for home by way of Australia, New Zealand, and Pearl Harbor. She arrived at Long Beach 7 June 1967 and conducted local exercises until entering Long Beach Naval Shipyard 13 October for overhaul. She remained in overhaul until February 1968; then, after refresher training off the west coast, departed for WestPac 5 July. After completion of overhaul and type training, Maddox once again deployed to the Far East in July 1968, returning in December 1968 to her home port, Long Beach, for overhaul and upkeep. Maddox was decommissioned in 1969 and assigned to the Naval Reserve Force. She was stricken from the Naval Vessel Register on 2 July 1972.

Maddox received four battle stars for World War II service, and six for Korean service.

=== Service in the Republic of China Navy ===
On 6 July 1972 she was transferred to Taiwan, commissioned into the Republic of China Navy, and renamed ROCS Po Yang (DD-10) and served with the Naval Weapons school.

Her number was later changed to DD-928.

Changed again to DD-910 in 1979.

In mid-1980s, her number was changed to DDG-910.

The ship was decommissioned on 30 June 1984 and scrapped in 1985.

Currently, the ship's bell sits at the Museum of Military Memorabilia in Naples, Florida.

== Awards ==
- Combat Action Ribbon
- Navy Unit Citation
- Asiatic-Pacific Campaign Medal with four battle stars
- World War II Victory Medal
- Navy Occupation Medal with "ASIA" clasp
- China Service Medal
- National Defense Service Medal with star
- Korean Service Medal with six battle stars
- Armed Forces Expeditionary Medal
- Vietnam Service Medal with three campaign stars
- Philippine Presidential Unit Citation
- Korean Presidential Unit Citation
- United Nations Korea Medal
- Philippine Liberation Medal with star
- Korean War Service Medal
- Republic of Vietnam Campaign Medal
