= Charles Howard Warren =

American railroad and insurance executive

Charles Howard Warren (October 21, 1856 - November 29, 1935) was an American railroad and insurance executive. The city of Warren, Minnesota, is named for him.

== Life ==
Warren was born October 21, 1856, in Carlton, New York, in Orleans County, son of Silas Leland Warren (1835-1893), who became a member of the Chicago Board of Trade, and Jennie L. Warren (1834-1918). He began his career in railroading as a clerk at the Chicago and North Western Railway in 1876 and then at the Chicago, Rock Island and Pacific Railroad. He became secretary to the general manager of the St. Paul, Minneapolis and Manitoba Railroad, a predecessor of the Great Northern Railway; and was then promoted to general passenger agent of the railway.

Around 1880, a village on the St. Paul, Minneapolis and Manitoba that had originally been named Farley was renamed Warren. Warren was incorporated as a village in 1881 and as a city in 1892. It is the seat of Marshall County, Minnesota. (Approximately 23 miles away in North Dakota, a city is named Manvel after the railroad manager Warren had been secretary under.)

Warren was soon promoted to comptroller of the St. Paul, Minneapolis and Manitoba, and when it was reorganized as the Great Northern, he became its general manager. Around 1896, Warren clashed with James J. Hill over the management of the railroad and was ousted. Warren's employment contract required the railroad to pay him until its completion. In 1897, Warren became an executive at Central Railroad of New Jersey.

On June 5, 1902, he succeeded to the presidency of the Rock Island Line. In 1906, he joined Mutual Insurance. In 1914, he advised the French railways and Swiss government how to handle the outbreak of World War I and manage their lines amid the war. Warren was subpoenaed in 1915 to testify before the Interstate Commerce Commission about gifts that railroads had made to officials. About this same time, he was ousted from Central of New Jersey in 1915 and was paid $200,000 severance, a remarkable figure at that time. He next became treasurer of the insurance company Mutual of New York, later known as MoNY. He retired in 1925.

On June 1, 1887, in St. Paul, Minnesota, Warren married Lilian Baker (born November 19, 1862, in Cambridge, Ohio). Their only son, Lewis Baker Warren was born in St. Paul on November 23, 1888. Lewis matriculated at Yale University and was injured in a football game, playing without a helmet. He died in Manhattan on November 5, 1912. Charles Warren endowed a scholarship at Yale in memory of Lewis in 1914; this was augmented by a $1,000,000 bequest from Charles's estate in 1936 after his death.

The Warren family as of 1910 lived at the Gotham Hotel (now The Peninsula New York). The family is buried at Woodlawn Cemetery in the Bronx.
