= Gulf of Tonkin incident =

1964 naval confrontation between North Vietnam and the United States

- Part of the Vietnam War
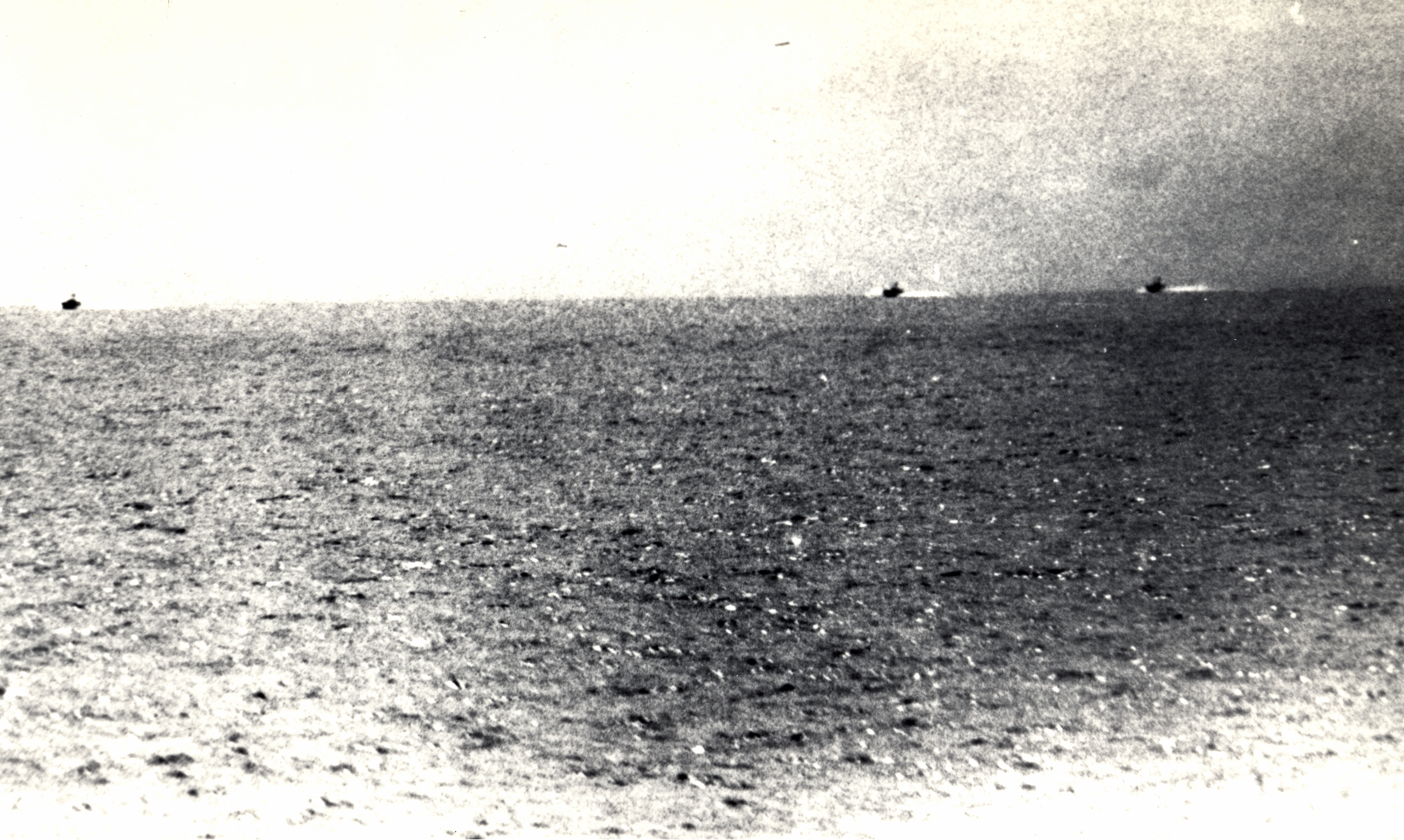
- Photo taken from USS Maddox during 2 August encounter, showing three North Vietnamese motor torpedo boats
Date	2 August 1964; 62 years ago
Location	Gulf of Tonkin 19°47′0″N 106°31′6″E
Result	Gulf of Tonkin Resolution; escalation of the War in Vietnam

Belligerents
United States	North Vietnam

Commanders and leaders
Robert McNamara; U. S. Grant Sharp Jr.; Roy L. Johnson; John J. Herrick	Le Duy Khoai; Van Bot; Van Tu; Van Gián

Strength
Sea: 2 destroyers; 1 aircraft carrier; Air: 4 aircraft	3 torpedo boats

Casualties and losses
1 destroyer slightly damaged; 1 aircraft slightly damaged	1 torpedo boat severely damaged; 2 torpedo boats moderately damaged; 4 killed; 6 wounded

The Gulf of Tonkin incident (Vietnamese: Sự kiện Vịnh Bắc Bộ) refers to a naval confrontation in the Gulf of Tonkin off the coast of North Vietnam, which led to the United States engaging more directly in the Vietnam War. On 2 August 1964 there was a clash between a destroyer of the United States Navy that was collecting signals intelligence close to North Vietnamese waters, and three North Vietnamese naval vessels. On the night of 4 August, two US destroyers reported they were attacked by North Vietnamese vessels and that they were returning fire. Later investigation revealed that the 4 August attack did not happen; no North Vietnamese vessels had been present. Shortly after the events, the National Security Agency, an agency of the US Defense Department, deliberately skewed intelligence to create the impression that an attack had been carried out.

On the night of 30 July, South Vietnamese commandos raided a North Vietnamese radar station on the island of Hòn Mê in the Gulf of Tonkin. The next day the destroyer USS Maddox commanded by Commander Herbert L. Ogier began patrolling near the North Vietnamese coast. On 2 August, the Maddox, while performing a signals intelligence patrol as part of DESOTO operations, near one of the islands that had been shelled two nights before, was approached by three North Vietnamese Navy torpedo boats of the 135th Torpedo Squadron. Maddox fired warning shots and the North Vietnamese boats attacked with torpedoes and machine gun fire. In the ensuing engagement, one US aircraft (which had been launched from the aircraft carrier USS Ticonderoga) was damaged, three North Vietnamese torpedo boats were damaged, and four North Vietnamese sailors were killed, with six more wounded. There were no US casualties. Maddox was "unscathed except for a single bullet hole from a [North] Vietnamese machine gun round".

On 3 August, destroyer USS Turner Joy joined Maddox and the two destroyers continued the DESOTO mission. On the evening of 4 August, the ships opened fire on radar returns that had been preceded by communications intercepts, which US forces said meant an attack was imminent. The commodore of the Maddox task force, Captain John Herrick, reported that the ships were being attacked by North Vietnamese boats when, in fact, there were no North Vietnamese boats in the area. While Herrick soon reported doubts regarding the task force's initial perceptions of the attack, the Johnson administration relied on the wrongly interpreted National Security Agency communications intercepts to conclude that the attack was real.

While doubts regarding the perceived second attack have been expressed since 1964, it was not until years later that it was shown conclusively never to have happened. In the 2003 documentary The Fog of War, the former United States secretary of defense, Robert S. McNamara, admitted that there was no attack on 4 August. In 1995, McNamara met with former North Vietnamese Army General Võ Nguyên Giáp to ask what happened on 4 August 1964. "Absolutely nothing", Giáp replied. Giáp confirmed that the attack had been imaginary. In 2005, an internal National Security Agency historical study was declassified; it concluded that Maddox had engaged the North Vietnamese Navy on 2 August, but that the incident of 4 August was based on bad naval intelligence and misrepresentations of North Vietnamese communications. The official US government position is that it was based mostly on erroneously interpreted communications intercepts.

The outcome of the incident was the passage by US Congress of the Gulf of Tonkin Resolution, which granted US president Lyndon B. Johnson the authority to assist any Southeast Asian country whose government was considered to be jeopardized by communist aggression. The resolution served as Johnson's legal justification for deploying US conventional forces to South Vietnam and the commencement of open warfare against North Vietnam in early 1965.

== Background ==
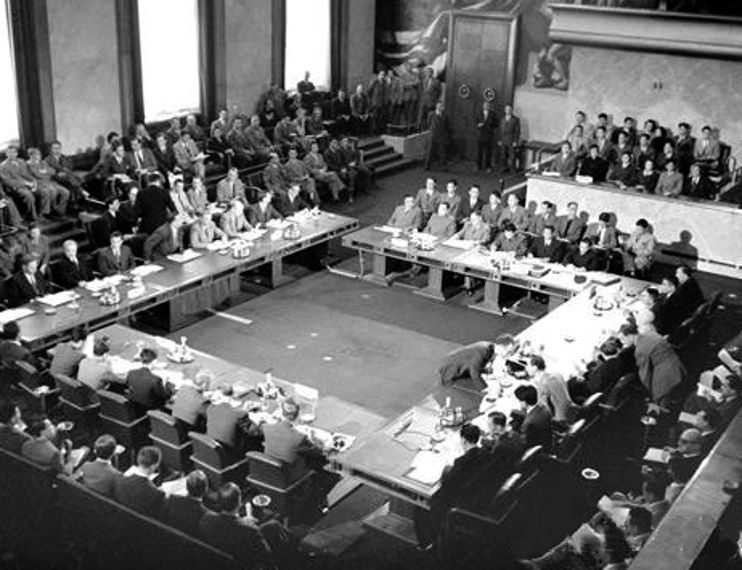
The Geneva Conference

The Geneva Conference in 1954 was intended to settle outstanding issues following the end of hostilities between France and the Viet Minh at the end of the First Indochina War. Neither the United States nor the State of Vietnam signed anything at the 1954 Geneva Conference. The accords, which were signed by other participants including the Viet Minh, mandated a temporary ceasefire line, which separated southern and northern Vietnam to be governed by the State of Vietnam and the Viet Minh respectively. The accords called for a general election by July 1956 to create a unified Vietnamese state. The accords allowed free movement of the population between the north and south for three hundred days. They also forbade the political interference of other countries in the area, the creation of new governments without the stipulated elections, and foreign military presence. By 1961, South Vietnamese President Ngo Dinh Diem faced significant discontent among some quarters of the southern population, including some Buddhists who were opposed to the rule of Diem's Catholic supporters. Viet Minh political cadres, who were legally campaigning for the promised elections between 1955 and 1957, were suppressed by the government. In March 1956, the North Vietnamese leadership approved tentative measures to revive the southern insurgency in December 1956. A communist-led uprising began against Diem's government in April 1957. The North Vietnamese Communist Party approved a "people's war" on the South at a session in January 1959, and on 28 July, North Vietnamese forces invaded Laos to maintain and upgrade the Ho Chi Minh trail, in support of insurgents in the south. The rebellion, headed by the National Front for the Liberation of South Vietnam (NLF, or Viet Cong) under the direction of North Vietnam, had intensified by 1961. About 40,000 communist soldiers infiltrated the south from 1961 to 1963.

The Gulf of Tonkin Incident occurred during the first year of the Johnson administration. While U.S. President John F. Kennedy had originally supported the policy of sending military advisers to Diem, he had begun to alter his thinking by September 1963, because of what he perceived to be the ineptitude of the Saigon government and its inability and unwillingness to make needed reforms (which led to a U.S.-supported coup which resulted in the death of Diem). Shortly before Kennedy was assassinated in November 1963, he had begun a limited withdrawal of 1,000 U.S. forces before the end of 1963. Johnson's views were likewise complex, but he had supported military escalation as a means of challenging what was perceived to be the Soviet Union's expansionist policies. The Cold War policy of containment was to be applied to prevent the fall of Southeast Asia to communism under the precepts of the domino theory. After Kennedy's assassination, Johnson ordered in more U.S. forces to support the Saigon government, beginning a protracted United States presence in Southeast Asia.

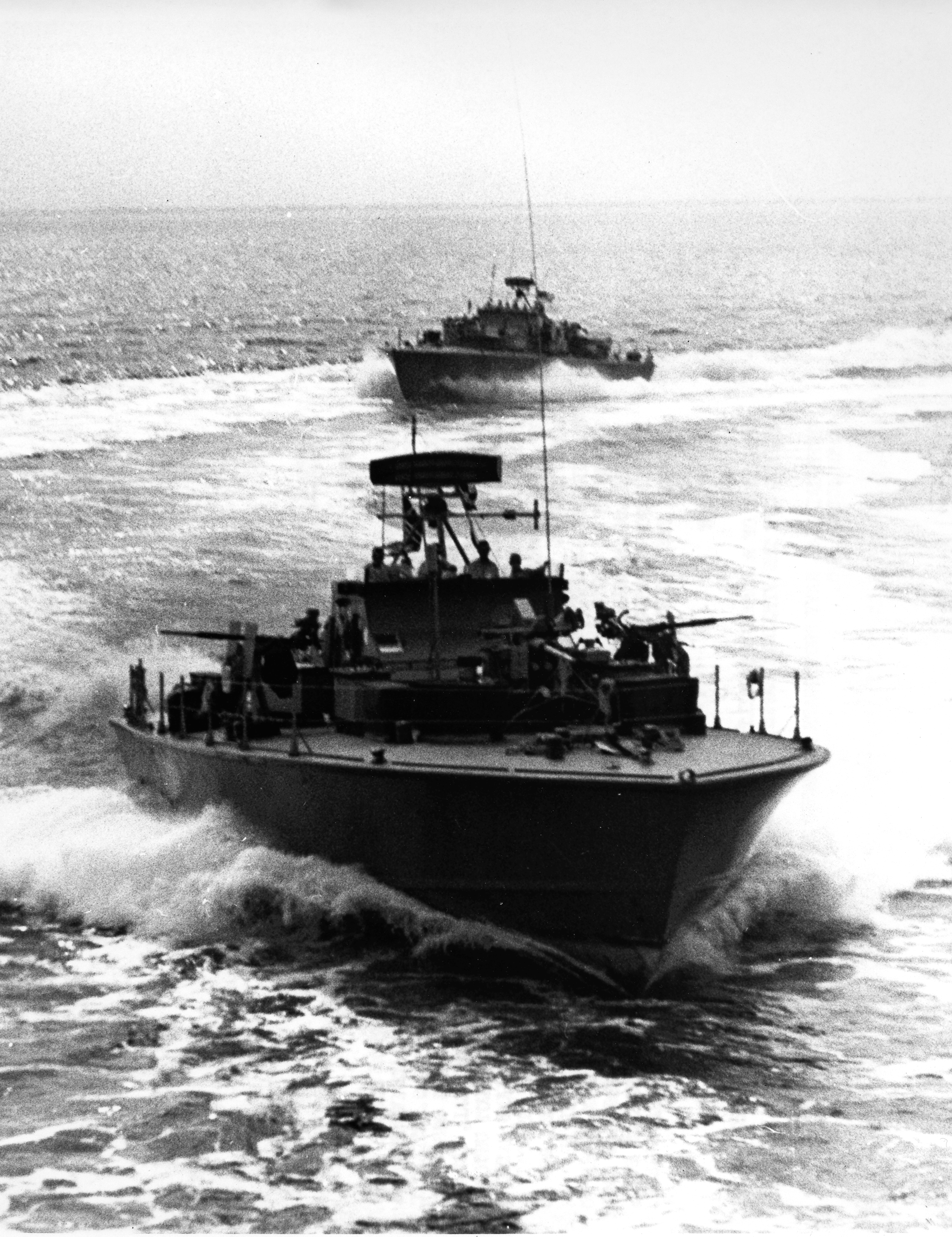
Two of the United States Navy PTF boats training in 1963

A highly classified program of covert actions against North Vietnam, known as Operation Plan 34-Alpha, in conjunction with the DESOTO operations, had begun under the Central Intelligence Agency (CIA) in 1961. In 1964, the program was transferred to the Defense Department and conducted by the Military Assistance Command, Vietnam Studies and Observations Group (MACV-SOG). For the maritime portion of the covert operation, a set of fast patrol boats had been purchased quietly from Norway and sent to South Vietnam. In 1963, three young Norwegian skippers traveled on a mission in South Vietnam. They were recruited for the job by the Norwegian intelligence officer Alf Martens Meyer. Martens Meyer, who was head of department at the military intelligence staff, operated on behalf of U.S. intelligence. The three skippers did not know who Meyer really was when they agreed to a job that involved them in sabotage missions against North Vietnam.

Although the boats were crewed by South Vietnamese naval personnel, approval for each mission conducted under the plan came directly from Admiral U.S. Grant Sharp Jr., CINCPAC in Honolulu, who received his orders from the White House. After the coastal attacks began, Hanoi, the capital of North Vietnam, lodged a complaint with the International Control Commission (ICC), which had been established in 1954 to oversee the terms of the Geneva Accords, but the U.S. denied any involvement. Four years later, Secretary McNamara admitted to Congress that the U.S. ships had in fact been cooperating in the South Vietnamese attacks against North Vietnam.

In 1962, the U.S. Navy began an electronic warfare support measures (intelligence gathering) program, conducted by destroyer patrols in the western Pacific, with the cover name DESOTO. The first missions in the Tonkin Gulf began in February 1964. While intelligence collected by DESOTO missions could be used by OPLAN-34A planners and commanders, they were separate programs not known to coordinate mission planning except to warn DESOTO patrols to stay clear of 34A operational areas.

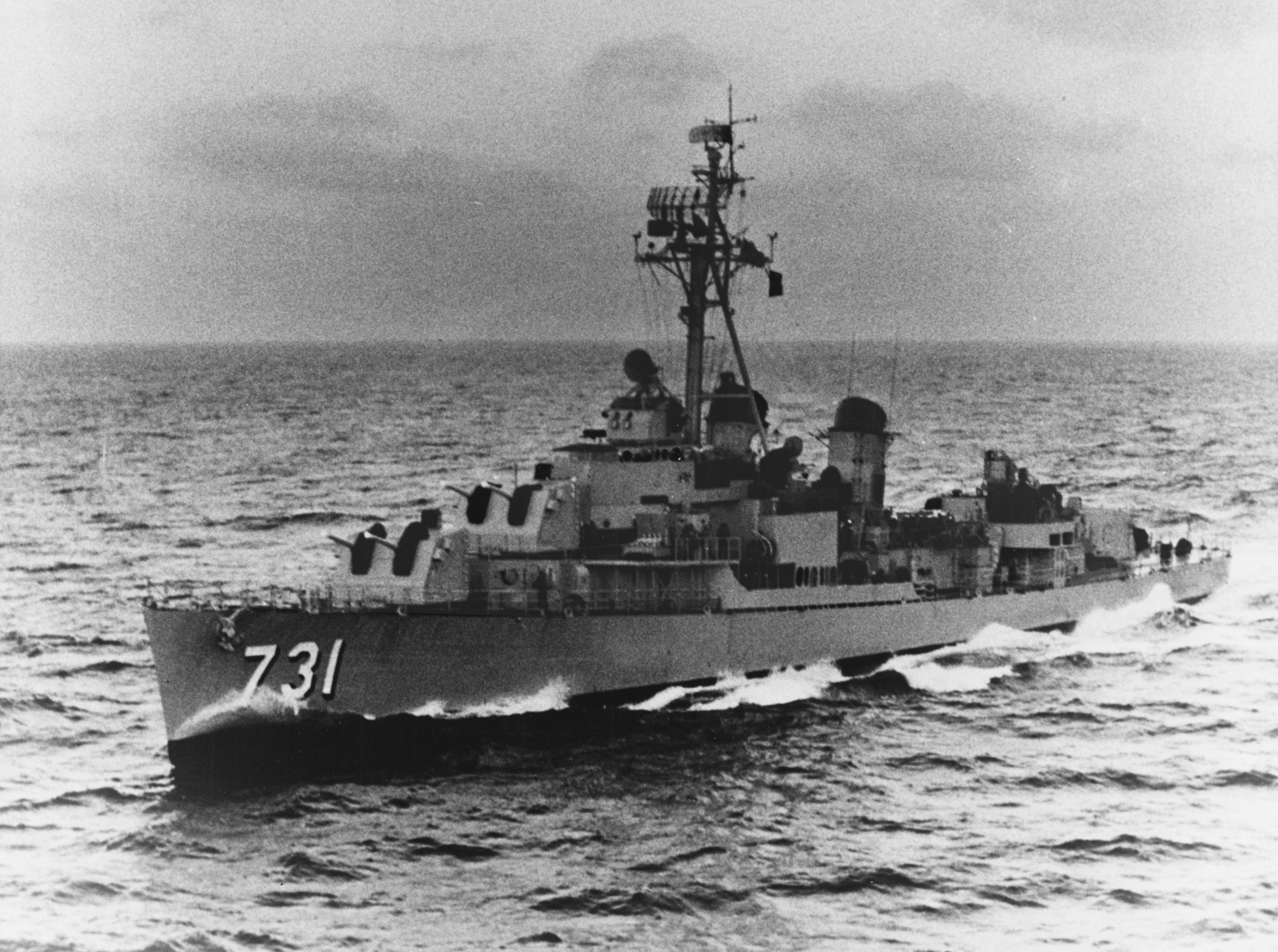
USS Maddox

On July 29, 1964, the night before it launched actions against North Vietnamese facilities on Hòn Mê and Hòn Ngư islands, the MACV-SOG had launched a covert long-term agent team into North Vietnam, which was promptly captured. On 1 and 2 August, flights of CIA-sponsored Laotian fighter-bombers (piloted by Thai mercenaries) attacked border outposts well within southwestern North Vietnam. According to Edwin Moïse, the Hanoi government (which, unlike the U.S. government, had to give permission at the highest levels for the conduct of such missions) probably assumed that they were all a coordinated effort to escalate military actions against North Vietnam.

== Incident ==
Daniel Ellsberg, who was on duty in the Pentagon the night of 4 August, receiving messages from USS Maddox, reported that she was on a DESOTO mission near Northern Vietnamese territorial waters. On 31 July 1964, Maddox had begun her mission in the Gulf of Tonkin. Maddox was under orders not to approach closer than eight miles (13 km) from North Vietnam's coast and four miles (6 km) from Hon Nieu island. When a MACV-SOG commando raid was being carried out against Hon Nieu, the ship was 120 miles (190 km) away from the attacked area.

=== First attack ===
Chart showing the track of the USS Maddox, 31 July – 2 August 1964 (date of first incident).

In July 1964, "the situation along North Vietnam's territorial waters had reached a near boil", because of South Vietnamese commando raids and airborne operations that inserted intelligence teams into North Vietnam, as well as North Vietnam's military response to these operations. On the night of July 30, 1964, South Vietnamese commandos attacked a North Vietnamese radar station on Hòn Mê island. According to Hanyok, "it would be attacks on these islands, especially Hòn Mê, by South Vietnamese commandos, along with the proximity of the Maddox, that would set off the confrontation", although the Maddox did not participate in the commando attacks. In this context, on July 31, Maddox began patrols of the North Vietnamese coast to collect intelligence, coming within a few miles of Hòn Mê island. A U.S. aircraft carrier, the USS Ticonderoga, was also stationed nearby.

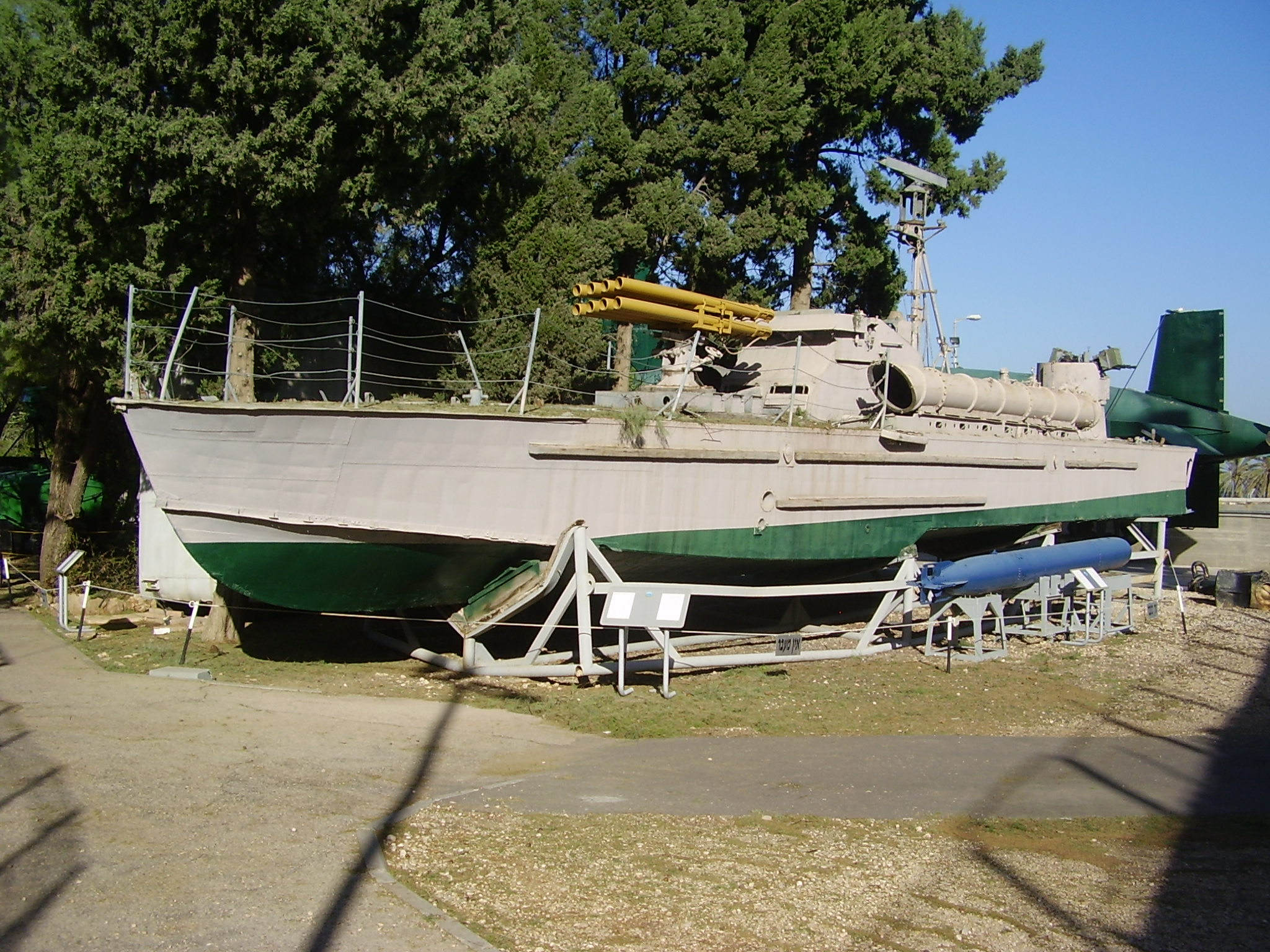
P-4 torpedo boat, similar to those used by the North Vietnamese military.

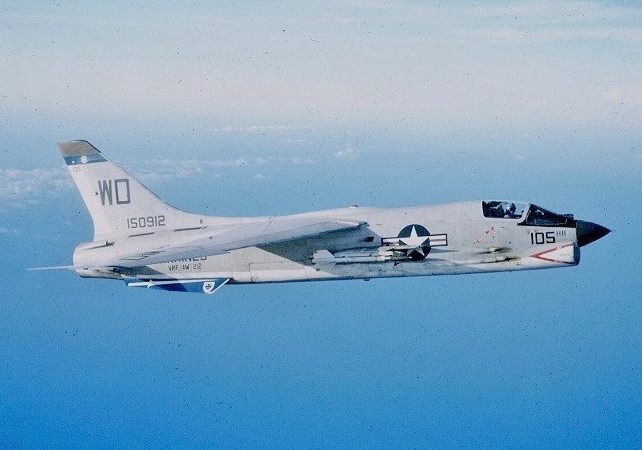
F-8 Crusader.

By 1 August, North Vietnamese patrol boats were tracking Maddox, and several intercepted communications indicated that they were preparing to attack. Maddox retreated, but the next day, Maddox, which had a top speed of 28 knots, resumed her routine patrol, and three North Vietnamese P-4 torpedo boats with a top speed of 50 knots began to follow Maddox. The boats were from Squadron 135, commanded by Le Duy Khoai, with the boats commanded by brothers Van Bot, Van Tu, and Van Gian. Intercepted communications indicated that the vessels intended to attack Maddox. As the ships approached from the southwest, Maddox changed course from northeasterly to southeasterly and increased speed to 25 knots.

As the torpedo boats neared, Maddox fired three warning shots. The North Vietnamese boats then attacked, and Maddox radioed she was under attack from the three boats, closing to within 10 nautical miles (19 km; 12 mi), while located 28 nautical miles (52 km; 32 mi) away from the North Vietnamese coast. Maddox stated she had evaded a torpedo attack and opened fire with its five-inch (127 mm) guns, forcing the torpedo boats away. Two of the torpedo boats had come as close as 5 nautical miles (9.3 km; 5.8 mi) and released one torpedo each, but neither one was effective, coming no closer than about 100 yards (91 m) after Maddox evaded them. Another P-4 received a direct hit from a five-inch shell from Maddox; its torpedo malfunctioned at launch. Four USN F-8 Crusader jets launched from Ticonderoga and 15 minutes after Maddox had fired her initial warning shots, attacked the retiring P-4s, claiming one was sunk and one heavily damaged. Maddox suffered only minor damage from a single 14.5 mm bullet from a P-4's KPV heavy machine gun into her superstructure. Retiring to South Vietnamese waters, Maddox was joined by the destroyer USS Turner Joy.

The original account from the Pentagon Papers has been revised in light of a 2001 internal NSA historical study, which states:

At 1500G, Captain Herrick ordered Ogier's gun crews to open fire if the boats approached within ten thousand yards. At about 1505G, the Maddox fired three rounds to warn off the communist [North Vietnamese] boats. This initial action was never reported by the Johnson administration, which insisted that the Vietnamese boats fired first.

Maddox, when confronted, was approaching Hòn Mê Island, three to four nautical miles (nmi) (6 to 7 km) inside the 12 nautical miles (22 km; 14 mi) limit claimed by North Vietnam. This territorial limit was unrecognized by the United States. After the skirmish, Johnson ordered Maddox and Turner Joy to stage daylight runs into North Vietnamese waters, testing the 12 nautical miles (22 km; 14 mi) limit and North Vietnamese resolve. These runs into North Vietnamese territorial waters coincided with South Vietnamese coastal raids and were interpreted as coordinated operations by the North, which officially acknowledged the engagements of August.

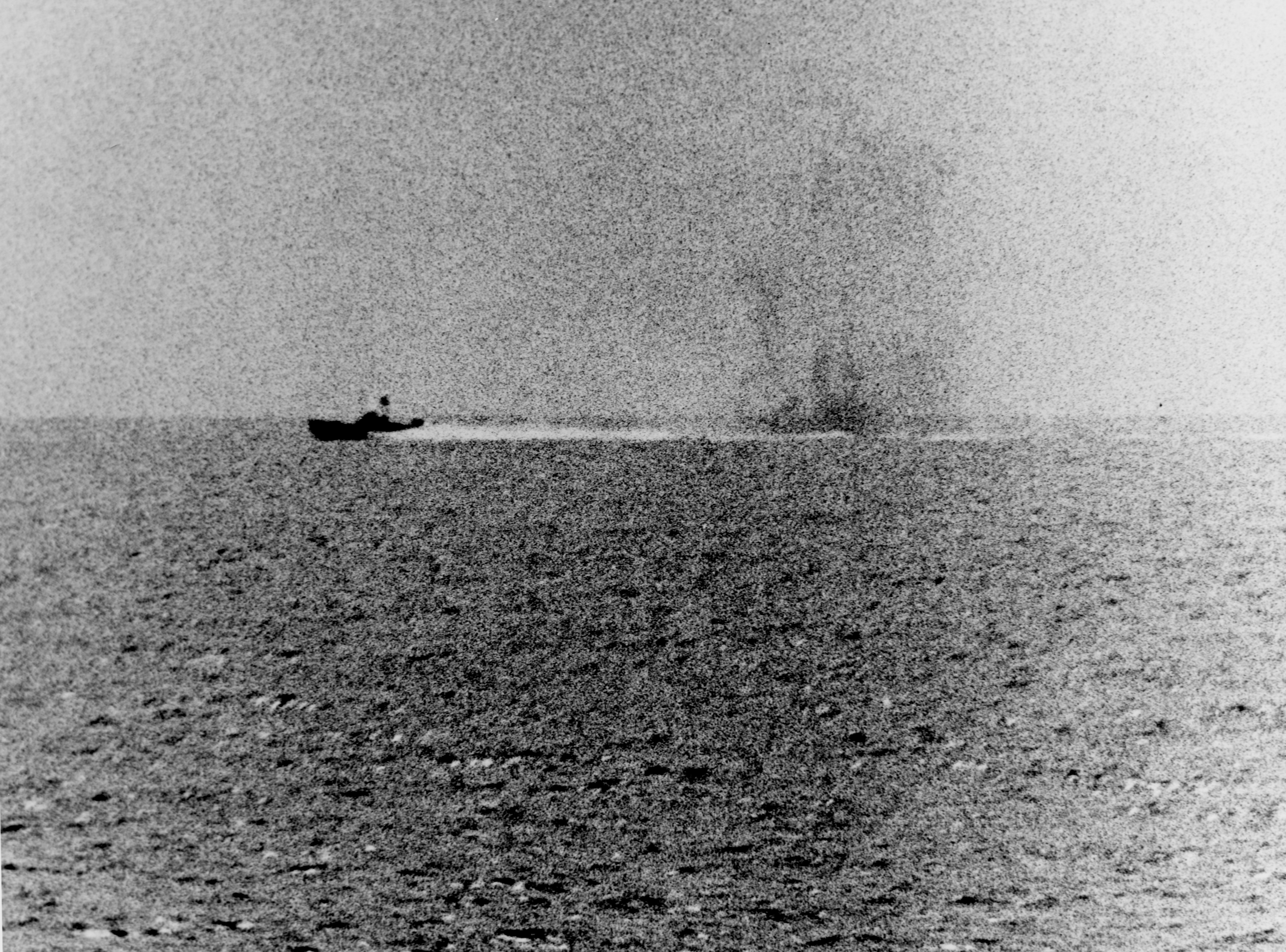
A North Vietnamese P-4 engaging USS Maddox, 2 August 1964.

Others, such as Admiral Sharp, maintained that U.S. actions did not provoke the incident. He claimed that the North Vietnamese had tracked Maddox along the coast by radar and were thus aware that the destroyer had not actually attacked North Vietnam and that Hanoi (or the local commander) had ordered its craft to engage Maddox anyway. North Vietnamese general Phùng Thế Tài later claimed that Maddox had been tracked since 31 July and that she had attacked fishing boats on August 2 forcing the North Vietnamese Navy to "fight back".

Sharp also noted that orders given to Maddox to stay 8 nautical miles (15 km; 9.2 mi) off the North Vietnamese coast put the ship in international waters, as North Vietnam claimed only a 5 nautical miles (9.3 km; 5.8 mi) limit as its territory (or off of its off-shore islands). In addition, many nations had previously carried out similar missions all over the world, and the destroyer USS John R. Craig had earlier conducted an intelligence-gathering mission in similar circumstances without incident.

Sharp's claims, however, included some factually incorrect statements. North Vietnam did not adhere to an 8-kilometer (5 mi) limit for its territorial waters; instead it adhered to a 20-kilometer (12 mi) limit claimed by French Indochina in 1936. Moreover it officially claimed a 12 nmi limit, which is practically identical to the old 20 km French claim, after the incidents of August, in September 1964. The North Vietnamese stance is that they always considered a 12 nautical mile limit, consistent with the positions regarding the law of the sea of both the Soviet Union and China, their main allies.

=== Alleged second attack ===
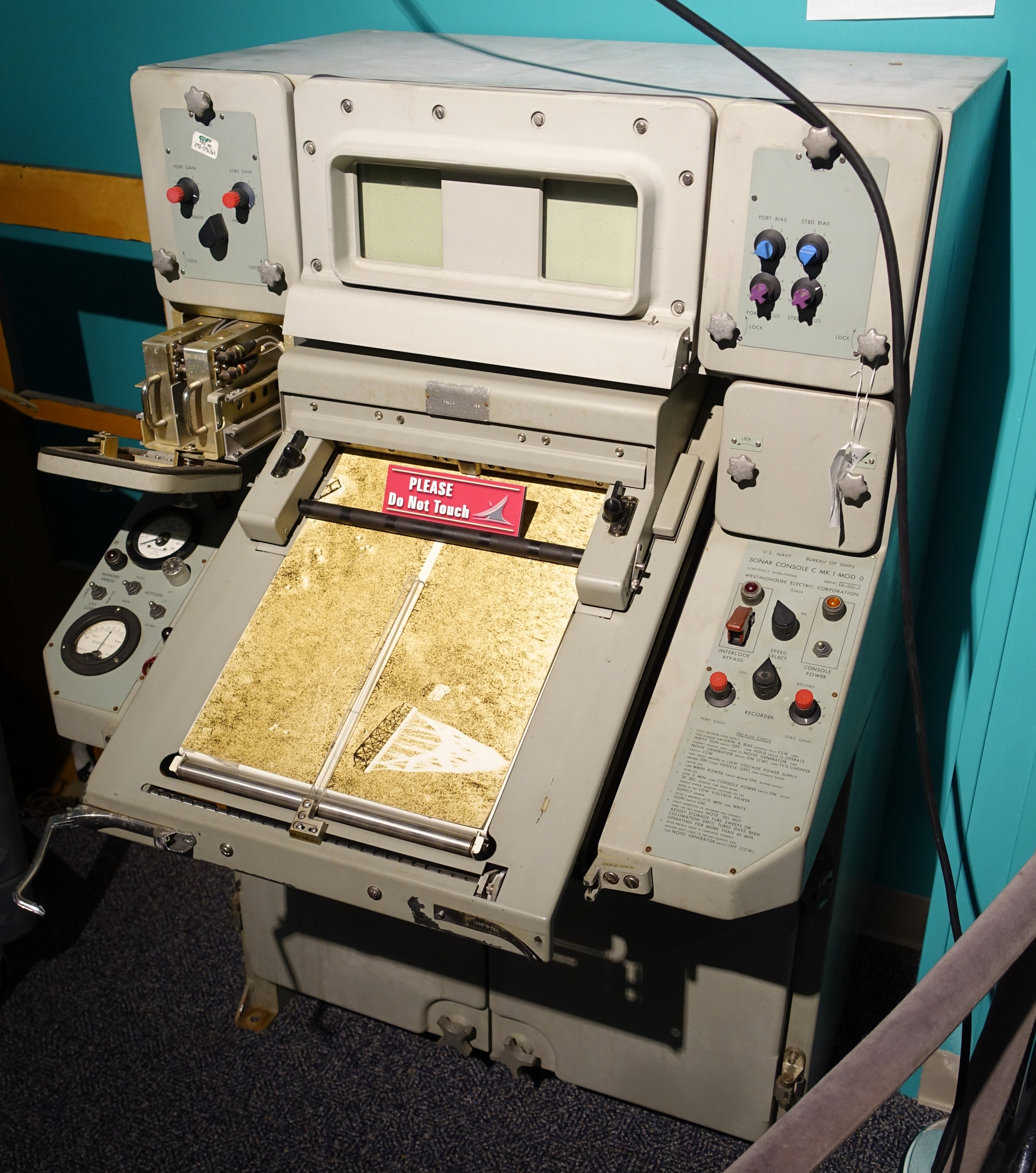
A sonar console.

On 4 August, another DESOTO patrol off the North Vietnamese coast was launched by Maddox and Turner Joy, to "show the flag" after the first incident. This time their orders indicated that the ships were to close to no less than 11 miles (18 km) from the coast of North Vietnam. During an evening of rough weather and heavy seas, the destroyers received radar, sonar, and radio signals that they believed signaled another attack by the North Vietnamese navy. For some two hours (from about 21:40 to about 23:35, local time) the ships fired on radar targets and maneuvered vigorously amid electronic and visual reports of enemies. Despite the Navy's claim that two attacking torpedo boats had been sunk, there was no wreckage, no bodies of dead North Vietnamese sailors, nor other physical evidence present at the scene of the alleged engagement.

At 01:27 local time (13:27 Washington time), Herrick sent a cable in which he acknowledged that the second attack may not have happened and that there may actually have been no Vietnamese craft in the area: "Review of action makes many reported contacts and torpedoes fired appear doubtful. Freak weather effects on radar and overeager sonarmen may have accounted for many reports. No actual visual sightings by Maddox. Suggest complete evaluation before any further action taken.

... And ultimately it was concluded that almost certainly the [4 August] attack had occurred. But even at the time there was some recognition of a margin of error, so we thought it highly probable but not entirely certain. And because it was highly probable—and because even if it hadn't occurred, there was strong feeling we should have responded to the first attack, which we were positive had occurred—President Johnson decided to respond to the second [attack]. I think it is now clear [the second attack] did not occur ...

— Defense Secretary Robert McNamara, 1996

One hour later, Herrick sent another cable, stating, "Entire action leaves many doubts except for apparent ambush at beginning. Suggest thorough reconnaissance in daylight by aircraft." In response to requests for confirmation, at around 16:00 Washington time, Herrick cabled, "Details of action present a confusing picture although certain that the original ambush was bona fide." It is likely that McNamara did not inform either the president or Admiral U. S. Grant Sharp Jr. about Herrick's misgivings or Herrick's recommendation for further investigation. At 18:00 Washington time (05:00 in the Gulf of Tonkin), Herrick cabled yet again, this time stating, "the first boat to close the Maddox probably launched a torpedo at the Maddox which was heard but not seen. All subsequent Maddox torpedo reports are doubtful in that it is suspected that sonarman was hearing the ship's own propeller beat" [sic].

In the face of growing uncertainties over the course of the day regarding whether the attack had occurred, the Johnson administration ended up basing its conclusion mostly on communications intercepts erroneously assessed to be North Vietnamese preparations to carry out an attack and a North Vietnamese after action report. Later analysis showed those communications to have concerned the recovery of torpedo boats damaged in the 2 August attack and North Vietnamese observations of (but not participation in) the 4 August U.S. actions.

== United States' response ==
=== Johnson's speech to the American people ===
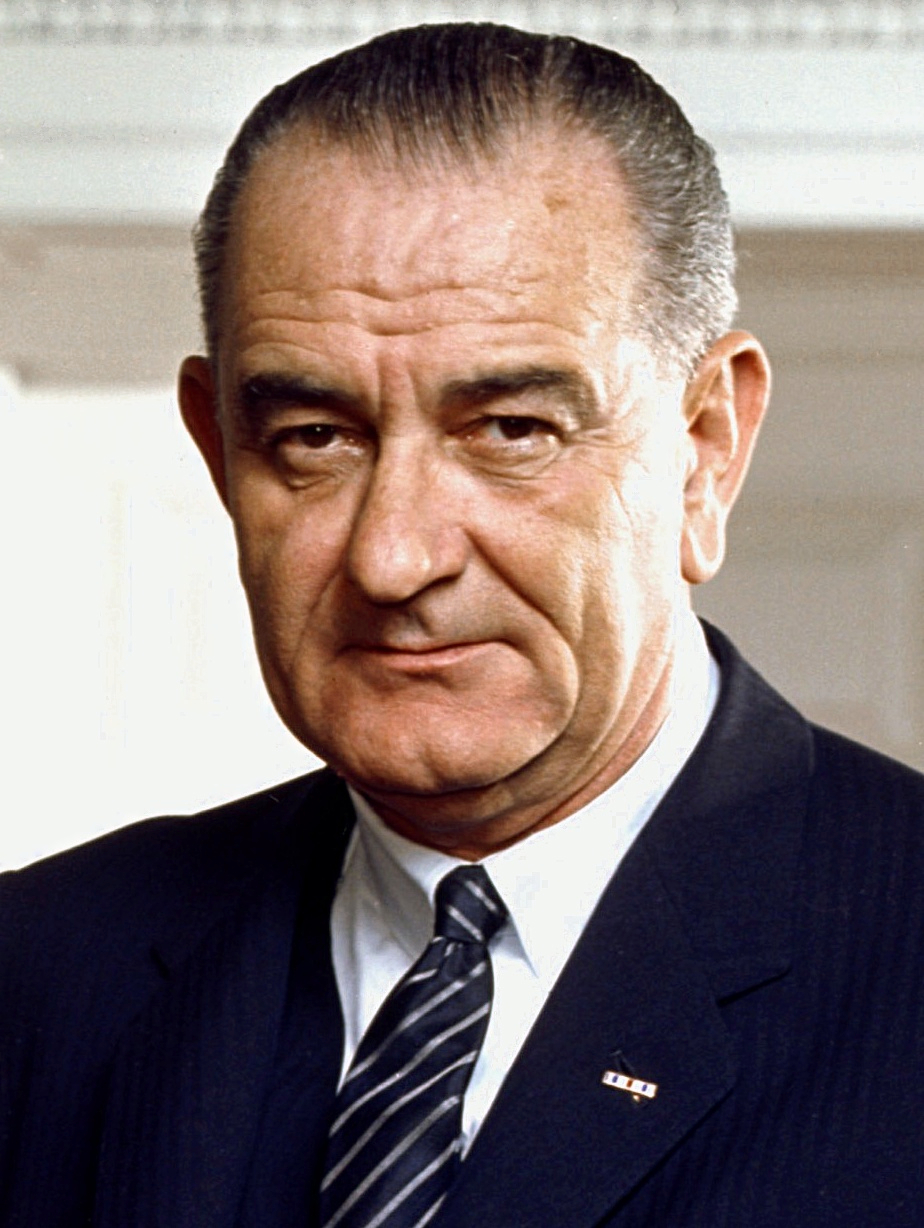
US President Lyndon Johnson in 1964.

Shortly before midnight, on 4 August, Johnson interrupted national television to make an announcement in which he described an attack by North Vietnamese vessels on two U.S. Navy warships, Maddox and Turner Joy, and requested authority to undertake a military response. Johnson's speech repeated the theme that dramatized Hanoi/Hồ Chí Minh as the aggressor and which put the United States into a more acceptable defensive posture. Johnson also referred to the attacks as having taken place "on the high seas", suggesting that they had occurred in international waters.

He emphasized commitment to both the American people, and the South Vietnamese government. He also reminded Americans that there was no desire for war. "A close scrutiny of Johnson's public statements ... reveals no mention of preparations for overt warfare and no indication of the nature and extent of covert land and air measures that already were operational." Johnson's statements were short to "minimize the U.S. role in the conflict; a clear inconsistency existed between Johnson's actions and his public discourse.

Within thirty minutes of the incident, Johnson had decided on retaliatory attacks (dubbed "Operation Pierce Arrow"). That same day he used the "hot line" to Moscow, and assured the Soviets he had no intent in opening a broader war in Vietnam. Early on 5 August, Johnson publicly ordered retaliatory measures stating, "The determination of all Americans to carry out our full commitment to the people and to the government of South Vietnam will be redoubled by this outrage." One hour and forty minutes after his speech, aircraft launched from U.S. carriers reached North Vietnamese targets. On 5 August, at 10:40, these planes bombed four torpedo boat bases and an oil-storage facility in Vinh.

=== Reaction from Congress ===
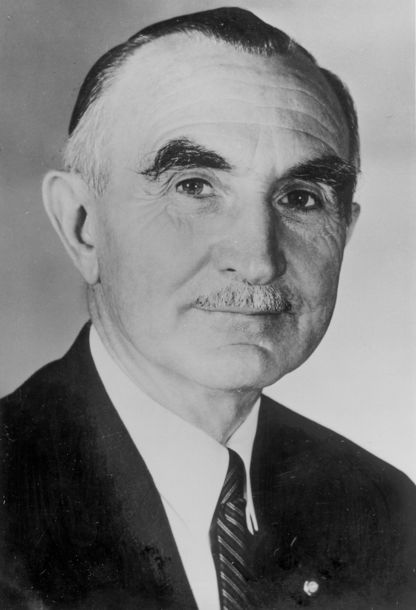
US Senator Wayne Morse (D-OR).

While Johnson's final resolution was being drafted, U.S. Senator Wayne Morse attempted to hold a fundraiser to raise awareness about possible faulty records of the incident involving Maddox. Morse supposedly received a call from an informant who has remained anonymous urging Morse to investigate official logbooks of Maddox. These logs were not available before Johnson's resolution was presented to Congress. After urging Congress that they should be wary of Johnson's coming attempt to convince Congress of his resolution, Morse failed to gain enough cooperation and support from his colleagues to mount any sort of movement to stop it. Immediately after the resolution was read and presented to Congress, Morse began to fight it. He contended in speeches to Congress that the actions taken by the United States were actions outside the constitution and were "acts of war rather than acts of defense." Morse's efforts were not immediately met with support, largely because he revealed no sources and was working with very limited information. It was not until after the United States became more involved in the war that his claim began to gain support throughout the United States government.

== Distortion of the event ==
The U.S. government was still seeking evidence on the night of 4 August when Johnson gave his address to the American public on the incident; messages recorded that day indicate that neither Johnson nor McNamara was certain of an attack. Various news sources, including Time, Life and Newsweek, published articles throughout August on the Tonkin Gulf incident. Time reported: "Through the darkness, from the West and south ... intruders boldly sped ... at least six of them ... they opened fire on the destroyers with automatic weapons, this time from as close as 2,000 yards. Time stated that there was "no doubt in Sharp's mind that the U.S. would now have to answer this attack", and that there was no debate or confusion within the administration regarding the incident."

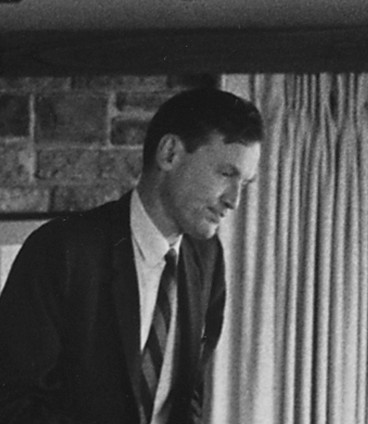
William Bundy.

The use of the set of incidents as a pretext for escalation of U.S. involvement followed the issuance of public threats against North Vietnam, as well as calls from American politicians in favor of escalating the war. On 4 May 1964, Assistant Secretary of State for East Asian and Pacific Affairs William Bundy had called for the U.S. to "drive the communists out of South Vietnam", even if that meant attacking both North Vietnam and communist China. Even so, the Johnson administration in the second half of 1964 focused on convincing the American public that there was no chance of war between the United States and North Vietnam.

North Vietnam's General Giáp suggested that the DESOTO patrol had been sent into the gulf to provoke North Vietnam into giving the U.S. an excuse for escalation of the war. Various government officials and men aboard Maddox have suggested similar theories. U.S. Undersecretary of State George Ball told a British journalist after the war that "at that time ... many people ... were looking for any excuse to initiate bombing". George Ball stated that the mission of the destroyer warship involved in the Gulf of Tonkin incident "was primarily for provocation."

According to Ray McGovern, CIA analyst from 1963 to 1990, the CIA, "not to mention President Lyndon Johnson, Defense Secretary Robert McNamara and National Security Adviser McGeorge Bundy all knew full well that the evidence of any armed attack [...] was highly dubious.... During the summer of 1964, President Johnson and the Joint Chiefs of Staff were eager to widen the war in Vietnam. They stepped up sabotage and hit-and-run attacks on the coast of North Vietnam." Maddox, carrying electronic spying gear, was to collect signals intelligence from the North Vietnamese coast, and the coastal attacks were seen as a helpful way to get the North Vietnamese to turn on their coastal radars. For this purpose, it was authorized to approach the coast as close as 13 kilometers (8 mi) and the offshore islands as close as four; the latter had already been subjected to shelling from the sea.

In his book, Body of Secrets, James Bamford, who spent three years in the United States Navy as an intelligence analyst, writes that the primary purpose of the Maddox "was to act as a seagoing provocateur—to poke its sharp gray bow and the American flag as close to the belly of North Vietnam as possible, in effect shoving its five-inch cannons up the nose of the communist navy. ... The [Maddox's] mission was made even more provocative by being timed to coincide with commando raids, creating the impression that the Maddox was directing those missions ..." Thus, the North Vietnamese had every reason to believe that Maddox was involved in these actions.

Assistant Secretary of Defense for International Security Affairs John McNaughton suggested in September 1964 that the U.S. prepared to take actions to provoke a North Vietnamese military reaction, including plans to use DESOTO patrols. William Bundy's paper dated 8 September 1964, suggested more DESOTO patrols as well.

== Consequences ==
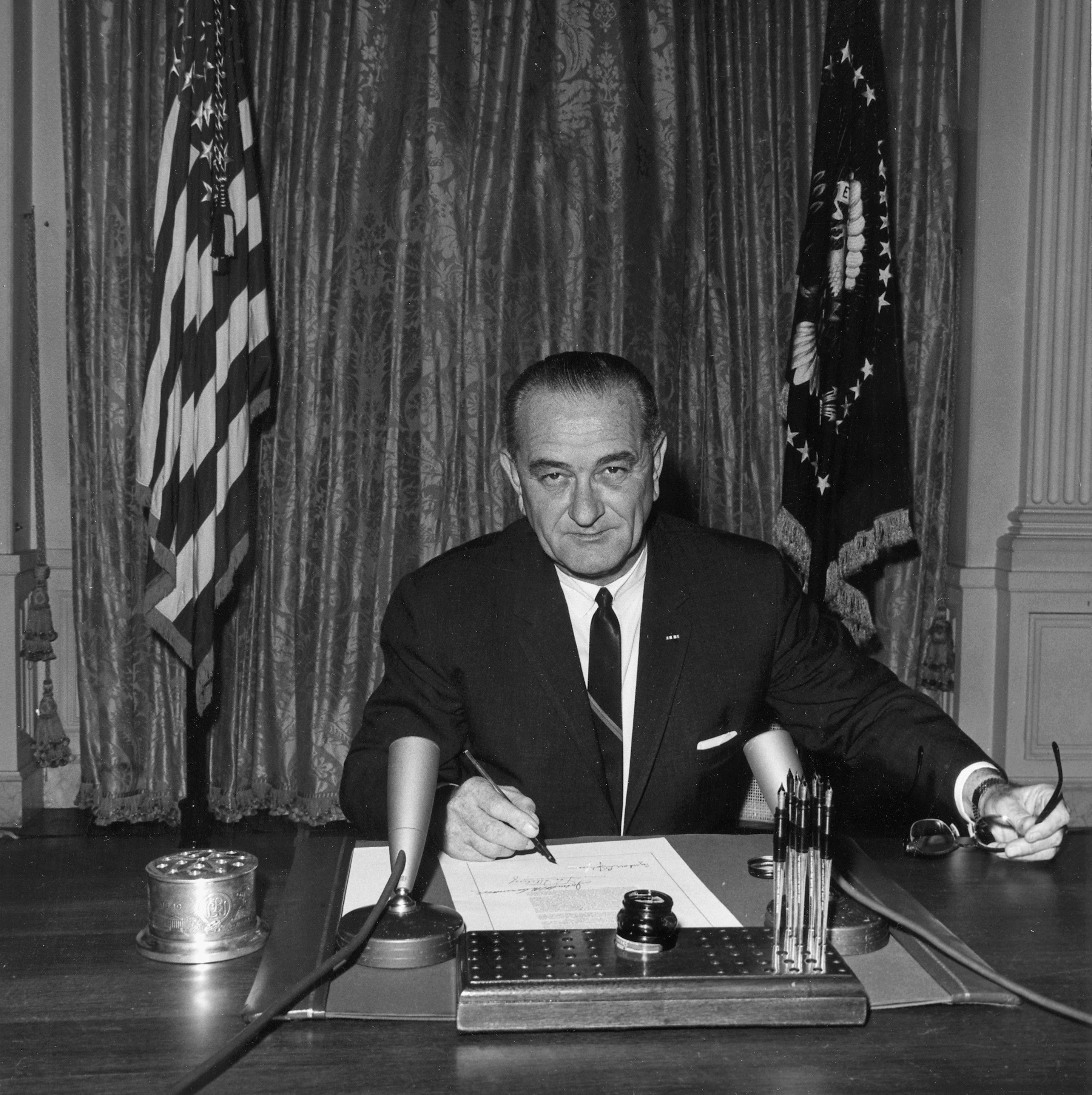
Johnson as he signs the resolution on 10 August 1964

By early afternoon of 4 August, Washington time, Herrick had reported to the Commander in Chief Pacific in Honolulu that "freak weather effects" on the ship's radar had made such an attack questionable. In fact, Herrick stated in a message sent at 1:27 pm Washington time that no North Vietnamese patrol boats had actually been sighted. Herrick proposed a "complete evaluation before any further action taken.

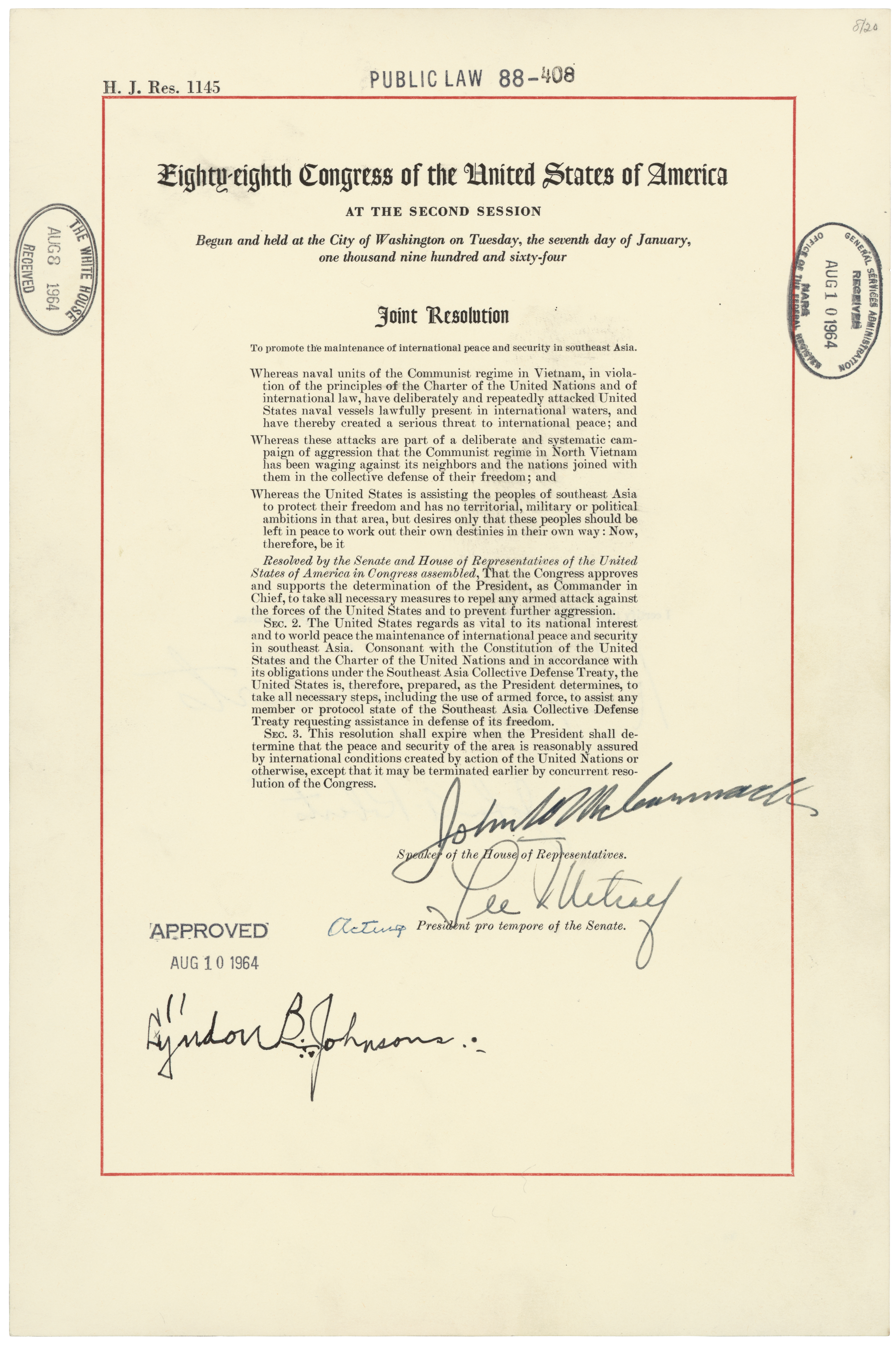
Tonkin Gulf Resolution

McNamara later testified that he had read the message after his return to the Pentagon that afternoon. But he did not immediately call Johnson to tell him that the whole premise of his decision at lunch to approve McNamara's recommendation for retaliatory air strikes against North Vietnam was highly questionable. Johnson had fended off proposals from McNamara and other advisers for a policy of bombing North Vietnam on four occasions since becoming president.

Although Maddox had been involved in providing intelligence support for South Vietnamese attacks at Hòn Mê and Hòn Ngư, Johnson denied, in his testimony before Congress, that the U.S. Navy had supported South Vietnamese military operations in the Gulf. He thus characterized the attack as "unprovoked" since the ship had been in international waters. As a result of his testimony, on 7 August, Congress passed a joint resolution (H.J. RES 1145), titled the Southeast Asia Resolution, which granted Johnson the authority to conduct military operations in Southeast Asia without the benefit of a declaration of war. The resolution gave Johnson approval "to take all necessary steps, including the use of armed force, to assist any member or protocol state of the Southeast Asia Collective Defense Treaty requesting assistance in defense of its freedom."

The Gulf of Tonkin Incident also had impacts in China, where it increased perceptions among Chinese Communist Party leadership that the United States would eventually invade China. This triggered greater support among leadership for Mao Zedong's Third Front Construction campaign to develop heavy industry and defense industry in China's interior where it would be more protected in the event of foreign invasion.

== Later statements about the incident ==
Johnson commented privately: "For all I know, our navy was shooting at whales out there."

In 1967, former naval officer John White wrote a letter to the editor of the New Haven (CT) Register. He asserts "I maintain that President Johnson, Secretary McNamara and the Joint Chiefs of Staff gave false information to Congress in their report about US destroyers being attacked in the Gulf of Tonkin." White continued his whistleblowing activities in the 1968 documentary In the Year of the Pig.

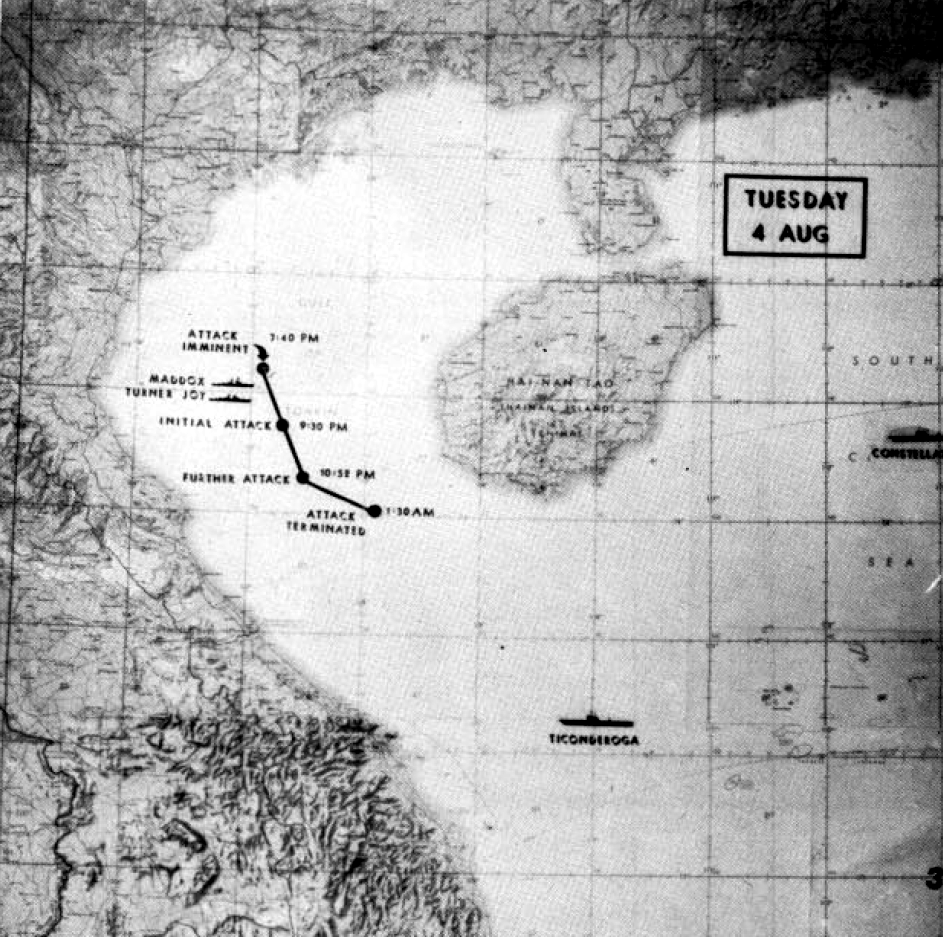
Map in the U.S. Navy All Hands magazine.

In 1981, Captain Herrick and journalist Robert Scheer re-examined Herrick's ship's log and determined that the first torpedo report from August 4, which Herrick had maintained had occurred—the "apparent ambush"—was in fact unfounded. Although information obtained well after the fact supported Captain Herrick's statements about the inaccuracy of the later torpedo reports as well as the 1981 Herrick and Scheer conclusion about the inaccuracy of the first, indicating that there was no North Vietnamese attack that night, at the time U.S. authorities and all of the Maddox's crew stated that they were convinced that an attack had taken place. As a result, planes from the aircraft carriers Ticonderoga and Constellation were sent to hit North Vietnamese torpedo boat bases and fuel facilities during Operation Pierce Arrow.

Squadron Commander James Stockdale was one of the U.S. pilots flying overhead during the second alleged attack. Stockdale writes in his 1984 book Love and War: "[I] had the best seat in the house to watch that event, and our destroyers were just shooting at phantom targets—there were no PT boats there ... There was nothing there but black water and American fire power." Stockdale at one point recounts seeing Turner Joy pointing her guns at Maddox. Stockdale said his superiors ordered him to keep quiet about this. After he was captured, this knowledge became a heavy burden. He later said he was concerned that his captors would eventually force him to reveal what he knew about the second incident.

In 1995, retired Vietnamese defense minister, Võ Nguyên Giáp, meeting with former Secretary McNamara, denied that Vietnamese gunboats had attacked American destroyers on 4 August, while agreeing that an attack occurred on 2 August. A taped conversation of a meeting several weeks after passage of the Gulf of Tonkin Resolution was released in 2001, revealing that McNamara expressed doubts to Johnson that the attack had even occurred.

In the fall of 1999, retired Senior CIA Engineering Executive S. Eugene Poteat wrote that he was asked in early August 1964 to determine if the radar operator's report showed a real torpedo boat attack or an imagined one. He asked for further details on time, weather and surface conditions. No further details were forthcoming. In the end he concluded that there were no torpedo boats on the night in question, and that the White House was interested only in confirmation of an attack, not that there was no such attack.

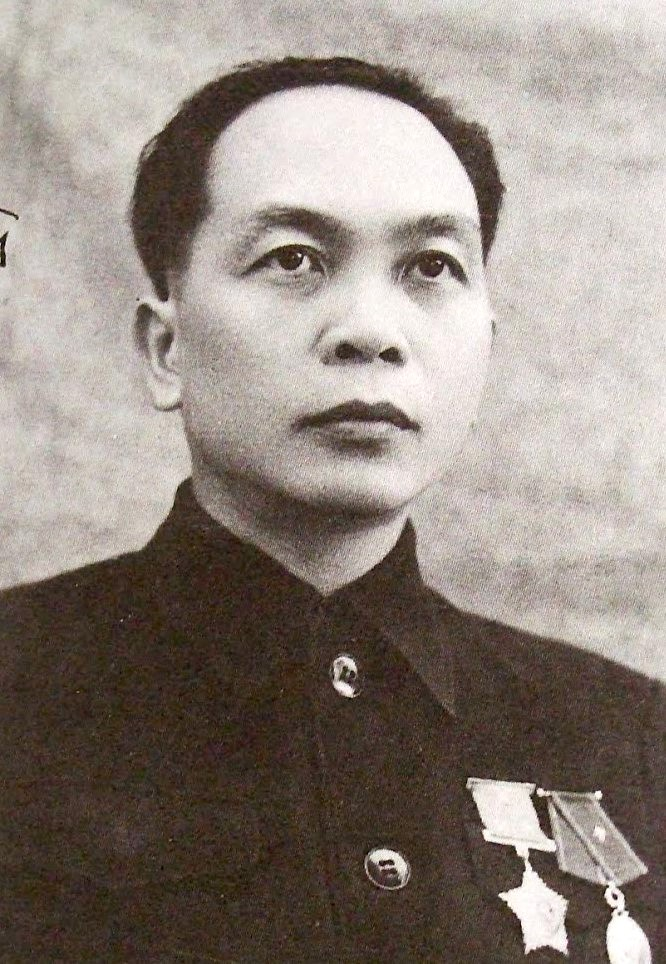
Võ Nguyên Giáp (1911–2013)

In 2014, as the incident's 50th anniversary approached, John White wrote The Gulf of Tonkin Events—Fifty Years Later: A Footnote to the History of the Vietnam War. In the foreword, he notes "Among the many books written on the Vietnamese war, half a dozen note a 1967 letter to the editor of a Connecticut newspaper which was instrumental in pressuring the Johnson administration to tell the truth about how the war started. The letter was mine." The story discusses Lt. White reading Admiral Stockdale's In Love and War in the mid 1980s, then contacting Stockdale who connected White with Joseph Schaperjahn, chief sonarman on Turner Joy. Schaperjahn confirmed White's assertions that Maddox's sonar reports were faulty and the Johnson administration knew it prior to going to Congress to request support for the Gulf of Tonkin Resolution. White's book explains the difference between lies of commission and lies of omission. Johnson was guilty of willful lies of omission. White was featured in the August 2014 issue of Connecticut Magazine.

== NSA report ==
In October 2005, The New York Times reported that Robert J. Hanyok, a historian for the NSA, concluded that the NSA distorted intelligence reports passed to policy makers regarding the 4 August incident. The NSA historian said agency staff deliberately skewed the evidence to make it appear that an attack had occurred. Hanyok's conclusions were initially published in the Winter 2000/Spring 2001 Edition of Cryptologic Quarterly about five years before the Times article. According to intelligence officials, the view of government historians that Hanyok's report should become public was rebuffed by policy makers concerned that comparisons might be made to intelligence used to justify the Iraq War (Operation Iraqi Freedom) which commenced in 2003.

Reviewing the NSA's archives, Hanyok concluded that the 4 August incident began at Phu Bai, where intelligence analysts mistakenly believed the destroyers would soon be attacked. This would have been communicated back to the NSA along with evidence supporting such a conclusion, but in fact the evidence did not do that. Hanyok attributed this to the deference that the NSA would have likely given to the analysts who were closer to the event. As the evening progressed, further signals intelligence (SIGINT) did not support any such ambush, but the NSA personnel were apparently so convinced of an attack that they ignored the 90% of SIGINT that did not support that conclusion, and that was also excluded from any reports they produced for the consumption by the president.

On 30 November 2005, the NSA released a first installment of previously classified information regarding the Gulf of Tonkin incident, including a moderately sanitized version of Hanyok's article. The Hanyok article states that intelligence information was presented to the Johnson administration "in such a manner as to preclude responsible decision makers in the Johnson administration from having the complete and objective narrative of events." Instead, "only information that supported the claim that the communists had attacked the two destroyers was given to Johnson administration officials."

With regard to why this happened, Hanyok writes:

As much as anything else, it was an awareness that Johnson would brook no uncertainty that could undermine his position. Faced with this attitude, Ray Cline was quoted as saying "... we knew it was bum dope that we were getting from Seventh Fleet, but we were told only to give facts with no elaboration on the nature of the evidence. Everyone knew how volatile LBJ was. He did not like to deal with uncertainties."

Hanyok included his study of Tonkin Gulf as one chapter in an overall history of NSA involvement and American SIGINT, in the Indochina Wars. A moderately sanitized version of the overall history was released in January 2008 by the National Security Agency and published by the Federation of American Scientists.

== See also ==
- Niger uranium forgeries
- Sinking of the RMS Lusitania
- Sinking of the USS Maine
- War Powers Clause
- PTF 3
