= Mildred (name) =

- Gender: Female

Origin
- Origin: Old English
- Meaning: "Gentle strength"

Other names
- Related names: Millie, Milly

Mildred /ˈmɪldrəd/ is a feminine given name. It is an Anglo-Saxon name of Old English origin, composed of "mild" ("mild") + "þryð" ("power, strength", also present in the last syllable of the name Audrey), meaning "gentle strength". It reached the rank of the sixth most popular name for baby girls in the United States in 1912 and maintained that popularity through 1920, but then its popularity dropped quickly afterward. It dropped out of the list of 1,000 most common baby girl's names in 1985 and had not returned to the top 1,000 as of 2025. Familiar forms include Milly and Midge.

== Notable people ==
People with the name Mildred include:

- Mildred Barber Abel (1902–1976), American politician
- Mildred Adams (1894–1980), American journalist
- Mildred Albert (1905–1991), American fashion show producer and radio and television personality
- Mildred Aldrich (1853–1928), American journalist
- Mildred Allen (physicist) (1894–1990), American physicist
- Mildred Allen (soprano) (1932–2021), American operatic soprano
- Mildred Ames (1919–1994), American writer
- Mildred Anderson, American singer
- Mildred Archer (1911–2005), English art historian
- Mildred Bailey (1907–1951), American jazz singer
- Mildred Inez Caroon Bailey (1919–2009), US Army officer
- Mildred Barya (born 1976), Ugandan writer
- Mildred Blaxter (1925–2010), British sociologist
- Mildred Barnes Bliss (1879–1969), American art collector
- Mildred L. Batchelder (1901–1998), American librarian
- Mildred Bendall (1891–1977), French painter
- Mildred Benson (1905–2002), American author
- Mildred Edie Brady (1906–1965), American writer
- Mildred Bryant Brooks (1901–1995), American printmaker, muralist, teacher
- Mildred Brown (1905–1989), African American journalist
- Mildred Burke (1915–1989), American wrestler
- Mildred Anne Butler (1858–1941), Irish artist
- Mildred Buxton, Countess Buxton (1866–1955), English aristocrat
- Mildred Cable (1878–1952), British missionary
- Iris Kyle (born Mildred Carter; 1974), American professional bodybuilder
- Mildred Caverly (1893–1985), American golfer
- Mildred Cleghorn (1910–1997), Apache tribe chairperson
- Mildred Clingerman (1918–1997), American writer
- Mildred Cohn (1913–2009), American biochemist
- Mildred Constantine (1913–2008), American curator
- Mildred Cooke (c.1525–1589), English noblewoman
- Mildred Couper (1887–1974), American musician
- Mildred Cram (1889–1985), American writer
- Mildred B. Davis, American novelist
- Mildred Davis (1901–1969), American actress
- Mildred Dover (born 1941), Canadian politician
- Mildred Dresselhaus (1930–2017), American professor
- Mildred Reason Dube (died 2022), Zimbabwean politician
- Mildred Dunnock (1901–1991), American actress
- Mildred Earp (1925–2017), American pitcher
- Mildred Adams Fenton (1899–1995), American scientific writer
- Mildred Fizzell (1915–1993), Canadian athlete
- Mildred Fox (born 1971), Irish politician
- Mildred Gale (1671–1701), grandmother of George Washington
- Mildred Barry Garvin (1929–1993), American politician
- Mildred Gillars (1900–1988), American broadcaster
- Mildred Gillett (1909–2014), English local historian
- Mildred Gordon (Ganas) (1922–2015), American activist
- Mildred Gordon (politician) (1923–2016), British politician
- Mildred Griffiths (1894–1949), American set decorator
- Mildred Grosberg Bellin (1908–2008), American cookbook author
- Mildred Harnack (1902–1943), American-German literary historian
- Mildred Harris (1901–1944), American film actress
- Mildred Annie Hickman (1895–1985), New Zealand photographer
- Mildred J. Hill (1859–1916), American songwriter
- Mildred Hilson (1898–1994), American socialite and philanthropist
- Mildred Hiltgen (died 1990), American politician
- Mildred Horn (1901–1998), American critic
- Mildred Barry Hughes (1902–1995), American politician
- Mildred "Millie" Jackson (born 1944), American singer and comedian
- Mildred Fay Jefferson (1926–2010), American physician
- Mildred Jeffrey (1910–2004), American activist
- Mildred Callahan Jones (1943–2008), American businesswoman
- Mildred M. Jordan (died 1965), American medical librarian
- Mildred Kornman (1925–2022), American actress
- Mildred Lager (1900–1960), American health food pioneer
- Mildred Childe Lee (1846–1905), American socialite
- Mildred Lillie (1915–2002), American judge
- Mildred Maddocks (1881–1955), American cooking journalist and writer
- Mildred Maldonado (born 2001), Mexican rhythmic gymnast
- Mildred Mangxola (born 1944), South African singer
- Mildred Mansel (1868–1942), British suffragette
- Mildred Esther Mathias (1906–1995), American botanist
- Mildred Mattingly (1927–2021), American teacher and state legislator
- Mildred H. McAfee (1900–1994), American academic
- Mildred McDaniel (1933–2004), American athlete
- Mildred Miller (1924–2023), American classical mezzo-soprano
- Mildred Bessie Mitchell (1903–1983), American psychologist
- Mildred Mottahedeh (1908–2000), porcelain collector
- Mildred Muis (born 1968), Dutch swimmer
- Mildred Melrose (1906–1952), American actress and dancer
- Mildred Natwick (1905–1994), American actress
- Mildred Noble (1921–2008), American writer
- Mildred O'Neill (1914–2003), widow of Tip O'Neil
- Mildred Ellen Orton (1911–2010), American businesswoman
- Mildred Pabón (born 1957), Puerto Rican jurist
- Mildred Parten Newhall (1902–1970), American sociologist
- Mildred Persinger (1918–2018), American activist
- Mildred Amelia Woodbine Pomare (1877–1971), New Zealand community leader
- Mildred Pope (1872–1956), English scholar
- Mildred Ratcliffe (1899–1988), English painter, commercial artist and calligrapher
- Mildred Riddelsdell (1913–2006), British civil servant
- Mildred Robbins Leet (1922–2011), American entrepreneur
- Mildred Ruiz-Sapp, American actress
- Mildred Sampson (born 1933), New Zealand long-distance runner
- Mildred Sanderson (1889–1914), American mathematician
- Mildred Savage (1919–2011), American author
- Mildred Scheel (1932–1985), German physician
- Mildred Schwab (1917–1999), American attorney
- Mildred Seeley (1918–2001), American doll collector
- Mildred Shay (1911–2005), American actress
- Mildred T. Stahlman (1922–2024), American neonatologist
- Mildred D. Taylor (born 1943), African American writer
- Mildred Thompson (1936–2003), African American artist
- Mildred Valley Thornton (1890–1967), Canadian painter
- Mildred Trotter (1899–1991), forensic anthropologist
- Mildred Trouillot (born 1963), American lawyer
- Mildred Veitch (1889–1971), American horticulturist
- Mildred Warwick (1922–2006), American athlete
- Mildred Weisenfeld (1921–1997), American philanthropist
- Mildred Wiley (1901–2000), American athlete
- Mildred Wolfe (1912–2009), American artist
- Mildred Bangs Wynkoop (1905–1997), American Nazarene minister

== Fictional characters ==
Characters with the name Mildred include:

- Mildred Rogers, a character from Of Human Bondage
- Mildred Hubble (The Worst Witch), protagonist of Jill Murphy's series
- Mildred Huxtetter, character from The Muppet Show
- Mildred Keith, title character from the series written by Martha Finley
- Mildred Krebs, a character from Remington Steele
- Mildred Montag, a character from Fahrenheit 451
- Mildred Pierce, protagonist of the novel, movie, and miniseries of the same name
- Mildred Ratched, nurse and main antagonist of One Flew Over the Cuckoo's Nest
- Mildred Roper, a character in the British TV sitcoms Man About the House and George and Mildred
- Mildred Wyeth, a character in the Deathlands series

== As a surname ==
- Henry Mildred, Australian farmer and politician
- Henry Hay Mildred, Australian lawyer and politician in the colony
