= Maddocks =

Maddocks is a surname. Notable people with the surname include:

- Ada Maddocks (1927–2007), British trade unionist
- Ann Maddocks (1704–1727), Welsh maid and a figure in Welsh folklore
- Anne Maddocks (1911–2006), English musician
- Charné Maddocks (born 1998), South African field hockey player
- Chris Maddocks (born 1957), English racewalker
- David Maddocks (born 1983), Welsh rugby union player
- Henry Maddocks (disambiguation), multiple people
- Ian Maddocks (born 1951), Australian cricketer
- Kenneth Maddocks (1907–2001), British colonial official
- Len Maddocks (1926–2016), Australian cricketer
- Margaret Maddocks (1906–1993), English writer
- Melrick Maddocks, South Africa field hockey
- Mildred Maddocks, American cooking journalist and writer
- Morris Maddocks (1928–2008), English Anglican bishop
- Peter Maddocks (1928-2024), English cartoonist
- Richard Maddocks (1928–1968), Australian cricketer
- Rick Maddocks (born 1970), Canadian writer and musician

== See also ==
- Maddock (surname)
- Maddox (surname)
