= Madocks =

Madocks is a Welsh surname. Notable people with the surname include:

- John Madocks (1786–1837), a Welsh politician
- William Madocks (1773–1828), a British politician and landowner

== See also ==
- William Maddocks (disambiguation)
- Maddock (surname)
- Maddox (surname)
