= Maddock =

Maddock is the obsolete term for earthworm or maggot. It also may refer to:

- Maddock (surname)
- Maddock, North Dakota, a US city
- Maddock Films, Indian film production company
  - Maddock Supernatural Universe, Indian horror media franchise

== See also ==
- Maddocks, a surname
- Mattock, a multi-use hand tool
- Madoc (disambiguation)
