= Jeff Hallebone =

Australian cricketer (1929–2018)

Personal information
- Full name: Jeffrey Hallebone
- Born: 3 August 1929; East Coburg, Victoria, Australia
- Died: 18 October 2018 (aged 89)
- Batting: Right-handed
- Role: Batsman

Domestic team information
- Years: Team
- 1952–1955: Victoria

Career statistics
Competition	FC
Matches	18
Runs scored	1,192
Batting average	40.10
100s/50s	3/6
Top score	202
Catches/stumpings	11/–
- Source: CricketArchive, 22 October 2018

Jeffrey Hallebone (3 August 1929 – 18 October 2018) was an Australian cricketer who played at first-class level for Victoria between 1952 and 1955. He was best known for his accomplishment of scoring a double century on his first-class debut, which made him the third Australian to accomplish that feat, and as of 2015 the last to do so.

== Biography ==
Hallebone was born in East Coburg, a suburb of Melbourne, to Dorothy Jessie (née Renshaw) and Edward Stephen Hallebone. He went to school in Geelong, attending Geelong High School before going on to Geelong College, where he played both cricket and football, for his final two years. During the 1948–49 season, Hallebone began playing for the South Melbourne Cricket Club in the Victorian grade cricket competition. He finished the season having played in all 15 matches, although his 17 innings yielded only two half-centuries. In his second season, however, he led South Melbourne's batting aggregates, with 459 runs from 13 matches.

Against Northcote in December 1951, during the 1951–52 season, Hallebone scored 179 runs out of a team total of 359. Less than two weeks after that innings, he was named twelfth man for Victoria's Sheffield Shield match against Queensland. Later in the season, in February 1952, Hallebone was named in the state team for a non-Sheffield Shield match against Tasmania, which had first-class status. Aged 22 on debut at the Melbourne Cricket Ground (MCG), he came in sixth in Victoria's first innings, and scored 202 runs before being dismissed by Noel Diprose. His innings included a 343-run fifth-wicket partnership with Richard Maddocks (who scored 271), which remains a Victorian first-class record as of August 2015. Hallebone became the second Victorian (after Sam Loxton), the third Australian (after Norman Callaway and Loxton), and the seventh player overall to score a double century on his first-class debut. He is the most recent Australian to have achieved the feat, which has only been performed seven more times since his innings.

Despite their performances, both Hallebone and Maddocks were dropped from the team for Victoria's next Sheffield Shield match, against South Australia, owing to the return of several Victorian players from the Australian national team. Hallebone first played Shield cricket during the 1952–53 season, and by the 1953–54 season had established himself as one of Victoria's top-order batsmen, playing in every match. In that season, he scored 563 runs to place third for runs scored for his team, behind Ray Harvey and Colin McDonald. Hallebone's total included two centuries, both against Queensland – 108 runs in the home fixture at the MCG, and then 143 not out in the away fixture at the Gabba. The second innings, which included six sixes from the bowling of Mick Raymer, was well received by the Brisbane Courier-Mail, which described him as "a mixture of Ken Mackay at his dourest and Richie Benaud at his brightest". Late in the season, Hallebone also scored 99 against the touring New Zealand team that was on its way back from a Test series in South Africa.

During the 1954–55 Shield season, which was reduced to a single round-robin format, with only four matches per team, Hallebone scored only 44 runs from Victoria's first three games, and was dropped for the final match. The next season, he played only twice, against Queensland and New South Wales, in what were the last matches of his first-class career. In December 1955, he left Australia for eight months to gain business experience in England and the United States. Hallebone, who was 26 at the time of his last state game, finished his career with a first-class batting average of 41.10, having scored 1,192 runs. He continued playing grade cricket for South Melbourne until the 1965–66 season, retiring at the age of 36.

Hallebone was married to Erica. He died on 18 October 2018 after a short illness.

== See also ==
- List of Victoria first-class cricketers
