= Social behavior in education =

Social behaviors present themselves in a variety of ways. Especially in those in the education system. Social behavior is behavior that occurs among two or more organisms, typically from the same species. Those in the K-12 system are in the process of developing behaviors that will generate future personality traits and behavioral patterns. Peers often have tremendous impacts on an individual's behavior and way of thinking.

== Different social patterns in children (K-5) ==
According to the Utah Education Network, there are 6 types of Social Patterns used by children:

- Unoccupied behavior: The child is not involved in any particular activity (often seen day dreaming).
- Onlooker behavior: This behavior involves watching other children play (watches the activity but does not participate).
- Solitary play: This type of play involves a child playing alone (Independent).
- Parallel play: This type of play involves a child playing beside other children (plays near the other children but not with them).
- Associative play: This type of play involves a child playing with other children (each child does what he/or she wants within the group).
- Cooperative play: This type of play involves organization (play as a group).

== Factors influencing behavior ==
=== Social learning theory ===
Albert Bandura is a psychologist who proposed Social Learning Theory, argues two decisive points in regards to learning theories. The first, mediating processes occur between stimuli & responses. Secondly, behavior is learned from the environment through the process of observational learning.

In and out of the classroom children learn through a four step pattern Bandura formulated through a cognitive and operant view.

1. Attention: something is noticed within the environment and the individual is attentive to it.
2. Retention: the behavior is noted and remembered.
3. Reproduction: the individual copies or emulates the behavior that is observed.
4. Motivation: the environment provides a consequence that changes the chances the behavior is repeated through her positive or negative praise or punishment.

== See also ==
- Deviance (sociology)
