= Mattick =

Mattick is a surname. Notable people with the surname include:

- Bobby Mattick, an American baseball player
- Fritz Mattick, a German botanist
- Paul Mattick, a German-born communist
- Wally Mattick, an American baseball player

== See also ==
- Maddock (disambiguation)
- Mattock, a hand tool
