= List of the most popular names in the 1920s in the United States =

These are the most popular given names in the United States for all years of the 1920s.

== 1920 ==
- Males
  1. John
  2. William
  3. James
  4. Robert
  5. Joseph
  6. Charles
  7. George
  8. Edward
  9. Thomas
  10. Frank
- Females
  1. Mary
  2. Dorothy
  3. Helen
  4. Margaret
  5. Ruth
  6. Virginia
  7. Elizabeth
  8. Anna
  9. Mildred
  10. Betty

== 1921 ==
- Males
  1. John
  2. Robert
  3. James
  4. William
  5. George
  6. Charles
  7. Joseph
  8. Edward
  9. Frank
  10. Thomas
- Females
  1. Mary
  2. Dorothy
  3. Helen
  4. Margaret
  5. Ruth
  6. Mildred
  7. Betty
  8. Virginia
  9. Elizabeth
  10. Anna

== 1922 ==
- Males
  1. John
  2. Robert
  3. James
  4. William
  5. Joseph
  6. Charles
  7. George
  8. Edward
  9. Richard
  10. Frank
- Females
  1. Mary
  2. Dorothy
  3. Helen
  4. Margaret
  5. Ruth
  6. Betty
  7. Frances
  8. Elizabeth
  9. Virginia
  10. Anna

== 1923 ==
- Males
  1. John
  2. Robert
  3. William
  4. James
  5. Charles
  6. George
  7. Joseph
  8. Edward
  9. Frank
  10. Richard
- Females
  1. Mary
  2. Dorothy
  3. Helen
  4. Margaret
  5. Betty
  6. Ruth
  7. Mildred
  8. Virginia
  9. Frances
  10. Elizabeth

== 1924 ==
- Males
  1. John
  2. Robert
  3. James
  4. William
  5. Charles
  6. Joseph
  7. George
  8. Edward
  9. Richard
  10. Donald
- Females
  1. Mary
  2. Dorothy
  3. Helen
  4. Betty
  5. Margaret
  6. Ruth
  7. Virginia
  8. Frances
  9. Doris
  10. Mildred

== 1925 ==
- Males
  1. John
  2. Robert
  3. James
  4. William
  5. Charles
  6. Joseph
  7. George
  8. Richard
  9. Edward
  10. Donald
- Females
  1. Mary
  2. Dorothy
  3. Betty
  4. Helen
  5. Margaret
  6. Ruth
  7. Doris
  8. Virginia
  9. Elizabeth
  10. Evelyn; Mildred (tie)

== 1926 ==
- Males
  1. Robert
  2. John
  3. William
  4. James
  5. Charles
  6. George
  7. Richard
  8. Joseph
  9. Edward
  10. Donald
- Females
  1. Mary
  2. Dorothy
  3. Helen
  4. Betty
  5. Margaret
  6. Ruth
  7. Virginia
  8. Doris
  9. Jean
  10. Maria

== 1927 ==
- Males
  1. Robert
  2. James
  3. John
  4. William
  5. Charles
  6. Richard
  7. George
  8. Joseph
  9. Donald
  10. Edward
- Females
  1. Mary
  2. Betty
  3. Dorothy
  4. Helen
  5. Margaret
  6. Ruth
  7. Virginia
  8. Doris
  9. Maria
  10. Shirley

== 1928 ==
- Males
  1. Robert
  2. John
  3. James
  4. William
  5. Charles
  6. Richard
  7. Donald
  8. George
  9. Joseph
  10. Edward
- Females
  1. Mary
  2. Betty
  3. Dorothy
  4. Helen
  5. Margaret
  6. Ruth
  7. Barbara
  8. Doris
  9. Maria
  10. Patricia

== 1929 ==
- Males
  1. Robert
  2. John
  3. James
  4. William
  5. Charles
  6. Donald
  7. Richard
  8. George
  9. Joseph
  10. Edward
- Females
  1. Mary
  2. Betty
  3. Dorothy
  4. Helen
  5. Margaret
  6. Ruth
  7. Doris
  8. Maria
  9. Barbara
  10. Shirley

== See also ==
- Popularity of birth names for females (United States)
