= Parten's stages of play =

1929 theory about children by Mildred Parten Newhall

Stages of play is a theory and classification of children's participation in play developed by Mildred Parten Newhall in her 1929 dissertation. Parten observed American preschool age (ages 2 to 5) children at free play (defined as anything unrelated to survival, production or profit).

Parten recognized six different types of play:

- Unoccupied (play) – when the child is not playing, just observing. A child may be standing in one spot or performing random movements.
- Solitary (independent) play – when the child is alone and maintains focus on its activity. Such a child is uninterested in or is unaware of what others are doing. More common in younger children (age 2–3) as opposed to older ones.
- Onlooker play (behavior) – when the child watches others at play but does not engage in it. The child may engage in forms of social interaction, such as conversation about the play, without actually joining in the activity. This type of activity is also more common in younger children.
- Parallel play (adjacent play, social coaction) – when the child plays separately from others but close to them and mimicking their actions. This type of play is seen as a transitory stage from a socially immature solitary and onlooker type of play, to a more socially mature associative and cooperative type of play.
- Associative play – when the child is interested in the people playing but not in coordinating their activities with those people, or when there is no organized activity at all. There is a substantial amount of interaction involved, but the activities are not in sync.
- Cooperative play – when a child is interested both in the people playing and in the activity they are doing. In cooperative play, the activity is organized, and participants have assigned roles. There is also increased self-identification with a group, and a group identity may emerge. This is relatively uncommon in the preschool and Kindergarten years, because it requires more social maturity and more advanced organization skills. Examples would be dramatic play activities with roles, like playing school, or a game with rules, such as freeze tag.

According to Parten, as children became older, improving their communication skills, and as opportunities for peer interaction become more common, the nonsocial (solitary and parallel) types of play become less common, and the social (associative and cooperative) types of play become more common.

Modern scholars agree that Parten's theory has contributed substantially to our understanding of play, and while alternative classification schemes have been proposed, Parten's stages of play are still widely used. However, there is disagreement on whether there is indeed a sequence of play stages that children go through – for example, whether toddlers are really unable to play cooperatively, and whether solitary play in older children is less common or a sign of immaturity. Alternative explanations suggest that types of play may be influenced by other circumstances (such as how well the children know one another).

== See also ==
- Sociology of childhood
- Sociology of leisure
