= Henry Maddocks =

Henry Maddocks may refer to:

- Sir Henry Maddocks (politician) (1871–1931), British Conservative Party Member of Parliament
- Henry Maddocks (RAF officer) (1898–?), British World War I flying ace

== See also ==
- Henry Maddock (died 1824), English barrister and legal author
- Henry Maddock (cricketer) (1836–1888), New Zealand cricketer
