= William Maddox =

William Maddox may refer to:

- William J. Maddox Jr (1921–2001), United States Army general
- William A. T. Maddox (1814–1889), officer in the United States Marine Corps

== See also ==
- William Maddocks (disambiguation)
