= Maddock (surname) =

Maddock is a Welsh surname. Maddock is the anglicised spelling of 'Madog', which originates from the ancient Welsh male given name 'Matoc', a diminutive of 'mad' meaning 'fortunate' or 'good'. There are many variations to the name, including Maddocks, Maddox, Maddick, Mattock, Mattack, Maddog, Madog, and Madoc.

Notable people with the surname include:

- Alfred Maddock (1917–2009), English inorganic chemist, radiochemist and spectroscopist
- Bea Maddock (1934–2016), Australian artist
- Chris Maddock (born 1977 or 1978), American stand-up comedian
- Diana Maddock, Baroness Maddock (1945–2020), British politician
- Harold Russell Maddock (1918–2014), Australian jockey
- Hopkin Maddock (1881–1921), Welsh rugby player
- Ieuan Maddock (1917–1988), Welsh nuclear researcher
- Joe Maddock (disambiguation), multiple people
- Kenneth Maddock (1937–2003), Australian anthropologist
- Owen Maddock (1925–2000), British engineer and car designer
- Shirley Maddock (1928–2001), New Zealand television producer
- Thomas Herbert Maddock (1792–1870), English politician
- Walter Maddock (1880–1951), American politician from North Dakota

== See also ==
- Madoc (disambiguation)
- Maddox (disambiguation)
