= Len Maddocks =

Australian cricketer

Personal information
- Born: 24 May 1926
- Died: 1 September 2016 (aged 90)
- Batting: Right-handed

International information
- National side: Australia
- Test debut (cap 199): 31 December 1954 v England
- Last Test: 26 October 1956 v India

Career statistics
Competition	Test	First-class
Matches	7	112
Runs scored	177	4,106
Batting average	17.70	32.84
100s/50s	0/1	6/20
Top score	69	122*
Catches/stumpings	18/1	210/67
- Source: ESPNcricinfo, 10 June 2022

Leonard Victor Maddocks (24 May 1926 – 1 September 2016) was an Australian cricketer and cricket administrator who played in seven Tests from 1954 to 1956. He was born in Beaconsfield, Victoria. He played first-class cricket for Victoria and Tasmania, and he was trapped lbw by Jim Laker to be the last dismissal of ten in an innings by the latter, at Old Trafford in 1956.

Maddocks was a wicket-keeper. He vied with Gil Langley for the position of Australian gloveman, replacing him when Langley was injured, although pressure from Langley, Don Tallon and Wally Grout, some of Australia's finest glovemen, meant he only played 7 Tests. His career as a cricket administrator was marred by the 3–0 loss in the 1977 Ashes tour, and the World Series Cricket split during his managerial reign of the Australian cricket team.

A brother, Richard, and son, Ian, both played first-class cricket for Victoria. On the death of Arthur Morris on 22 August 2015, he became the oldest surviving Australian Test cricketer.
