= Parallel play =

Form of play with no direct interaction

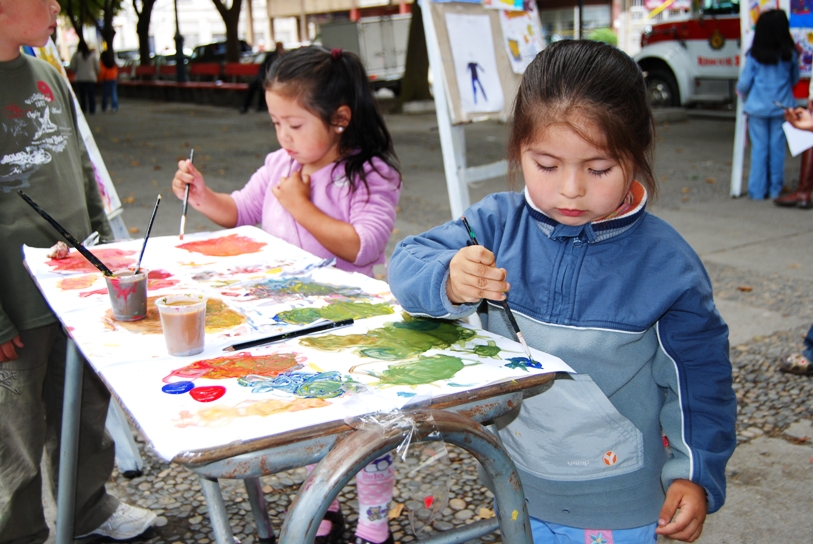
These two girls painting show parallel play because they are not paying attention to each other despite engaging in the same activity.

Parallel play is a form of play in which children engage in recreational activities adjacent to each other, without trying to influence one another's behavior. It typically begins around 24–30 months, and tapers off within childhood. It is one of Parten's stages of play, following onlooker play and preceding associative play.

An observer will notice that the children occasionally see what the others are doing and then modify their play accordingly. The older the children are, the less frequently they engage in this type of play. However, even older preschool children engage in parallel play, an enduring and frequent activity over the preschool years. The image of parallel play is two children playing side by side in a sandbox, each absorbed in their own game, not interacting with the other. "This is considered an early stage in child development, characterized by egocentric behavior and the inability to decenter and coordinate with the activities of a 'playmate'".

In education, parallel play also describes activities where students are divided into pairs or small groups and work on the same activity simultaneously. This gives all students equal opportunity for active involvement and reduces exposure – since all students are playing, none are watching. This stage ends when a child develops the ability to engage in interactive play behavior and symbolic communication.

Parallel play in adults is under-researched; RMIT University psychology lecturer Dr James Collett has suggested this may be because of cultural stereotypes that adults should be autonomous and self-sufficient, and because 'spending time together' in adult social and romantic relationships is idealised narrowly in terms of mutual attention and interaction.

Independent coworking, also called body doubling, is the work equivalent of parallel play. For adults, parallel play can also be a peaceful and low-pressure way to socialise; between family members and romantic partners it can indicate a healthy form of attachment.

Autistic people often engage in parallel play into adulthood, with other autistic people, caregivers and others. Relatedly, body doubling has been popularised as an adaptive productivity strategy for people with Attention Deficit Hyperactivity Disorder.

== History ==
Mildred Parten was one of the first to study peer sociability among 2 to 5-year-olds in 1932. Parten noticed a dramatic rise of interactive play with age and concluded that social development includes three stages. Parallel play is the first of three stages of play observed in young children. The other two stages include simple social play (playing and sharing together), and finally cooperative play (different complementary roles; shared purpose). The research by Parten indicated that preschool children prefer groups of two, parallel play was less likely with age, a majority of the kids chose playmates of the same sex, and that the most common parallel play activities were sand play along with constructive work. Other findings in her study showed that I.Q. level had little impact, siblings preferred to play with each other, home environment was a big factor, and playing house was the most common form of social play among children. Research indicates that these forms of play emerge in the order suggested by Parten, but they do not form a developmental sequence in which later-appearing ones replace earlier ones. All types coexist during the preschool years. Vygotsky believed that play during childhood created a zone of proximal development of the child and guided in intellectual development. Socioeconomic status appeared to only impact associative play, where British children who were used in the study of low socioeconomic status preferred that type of play. This could be explained due to the fact that those kids had fewer toys and more siblings to share toys with.

== Developing skills ==
Parallel play helps children begin language development and create social relationships. Rubin et al. (1976) have suggested that "those who play beside others may desire the company of other children but may not yet have the skills required to play in an associative or cooperative manner". It can also assist with gross and fine motor skills through the child's own individualized play. Parallel play can increase confidence because children are learning to play near others. Children can observe one another and learn to use new skills from playing alongside others. Eventually, it will lead to social development where the child will form relationships with others during play. Parallel play can be useful in encouraging expression of a child's feelings through their own individualized play. The child will increasingly learn to share and become aware of others emotions, as well as learn cause and effect through trial and error of adjusting and solving problems in play.

"Parallel play is often viewed as characteristics of a 'stage' through which children pass as they develop from solitary players to social players". Children will undergo different playing stages in order to finally join people in groups. Analysis published in 2003 in Early Childhood Research Quarterly showed that preschool children, who enjoy watching others engage in parallel play, can have future activities designed to help with transition into higher levels of social interaction. The parallel-play activities can help neglected or rejected children with social transition between social-play states. Smith believed parallel play to be optional and not "After Parallel play, children were most likely to be found in either Together or Group Play". This suggests that parallel play played an important role to this transition.

According to a study performed by Wei Peng and Julia Crouse, parallel play can be used to design games, especially active video games that involve physical activity, to be more effective. Playing with other people, even if those individuals are strangers, was more motivational than playing alone and there does not appear to be a major difference in cooperation and competition between same physical space mode and separated physical-space mode. Also playing with others or online creates an ability to relate to others and parallel competition in separated space is more enjoyable, more physically exerting and creates higher future play motivation.

Children cope differently depending on how they were raised; this also applies to how they cope with unfamiliar beings in their lives. Jens B. Asendorpf refers to parallel play as a child's coping style, and explains that children who want to play with an unfamiliar peer will resort to this style. This coping style allows children to engage in the same activities as their peers from afar, until they are comfortable enough to socialize with their peers.
