= Ganas =

Intentional community in New York City

Coordinates: 40.637779°N 74.083359°W

Ganas Community
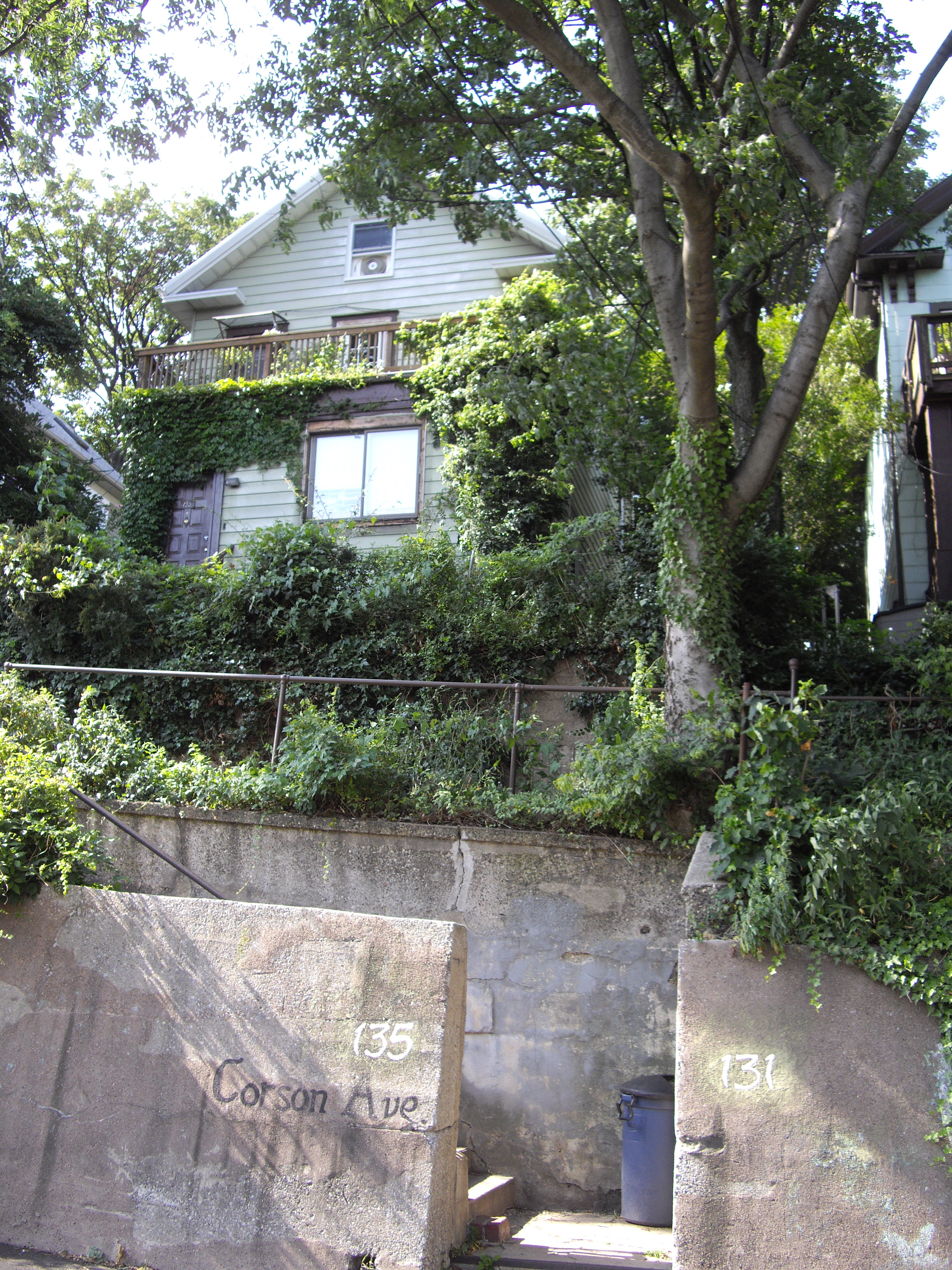
- 135 Corson Avenue, Staten Island
- Formation: 1979
- Type: Intentional community
- Purpose: Feedback Learning, recycling
- Location: Staten Island
- Members: 70–80

Ganas is an intentional community founded in 1979 in Tompkinsville, Staten Island. Ganas has non-egalitarian, tiered membership groups, and is thus a partial member at the Federation of Egalitarian Communities. The community uses a group problem-solving process called "Feedback Learning", which was begun by co-founder Mildred Gordon. The community attracted press attention after a 2006 shooting incident which led to lurid tabloid headlines. The community was founded by a group of six people, and has grown to consist of 10–12 core group members plus 60 to 70 members of varying involvement. There are three businesses run by Ganas, including a bookstore-cafe.

== History ==
Ganas started in Staten Island in 1979 with six founders including Mildred Gordon and Jeff Gross. In 1973 Gordon left New York City where she had founded GROW, an unaccredited school of group therapy that "turned out unlicensed group psychotherapists." Throughout 1972 GROW was the subject of state Attorney General and city fraud investigations into "fraudulent use of Ph.D.'s from unaccredited universities". Gordon went to San Francisco where she studied biofeedback which became the basis of what she termed "Feedback Learning". Gordon met the five people who would become the original core-group of the Ganas community and incorporated the tax-exempt 501(c)(3) non-profit organization Foundation for Feedback Learning (FFL) in 1974. The new community went by the name FFL until changing their name to Ganas in the early 1990s. In the late 1970s they returned to New York and moved into a Lower East Side apartment, finally settling in Tompkinsville, Staten Island in 1979. On Staten Island the core-group shares ownership of eight houses and three commercial buildings that house their retail stores. There are about 65 non-core group residents who live in Ganas houses and cover expenses by either paying rent or working in the stores.

== Culture ==
Ganas operates on four primary rules forbidding violence, freeloading, illegal activities, and non-negotiable negativity (requiring that complaints be discussed in group process or not discussed at all either in private or public). The primary focus of Ganas is Feedback Learning, an "intense brand of communication" according to The New York Times, about which journalist Jonah Owen Lamb writes: "Those new to Ganas would share their life story with the group, who would respond by picking apart their issues and deciding how those issues should be dealt with. By 'killing their buddhas,' it was felt, Ganas members could begin to take control of how they reacted to the world." Mildred Gordon describes Feedback Learning as an "indispensable day-to-day guiding experience" in which members of the community provide feedback—helpful criticism—to each other. Through daily discussions of every community member's behaviour members can learn about themselves and their motivations, gain from hearing unpleasant truths, and "accept negative information with the excitement of discovery". Mildred Gordon left Ganas in 2001 but still returned weekly to conduct Feedback Learning sessions at the commune. Profiles of Ganas today suggest the community has become less insular, with a more diverse group living there relatively less engaged in feedback learning.

== Finances ==
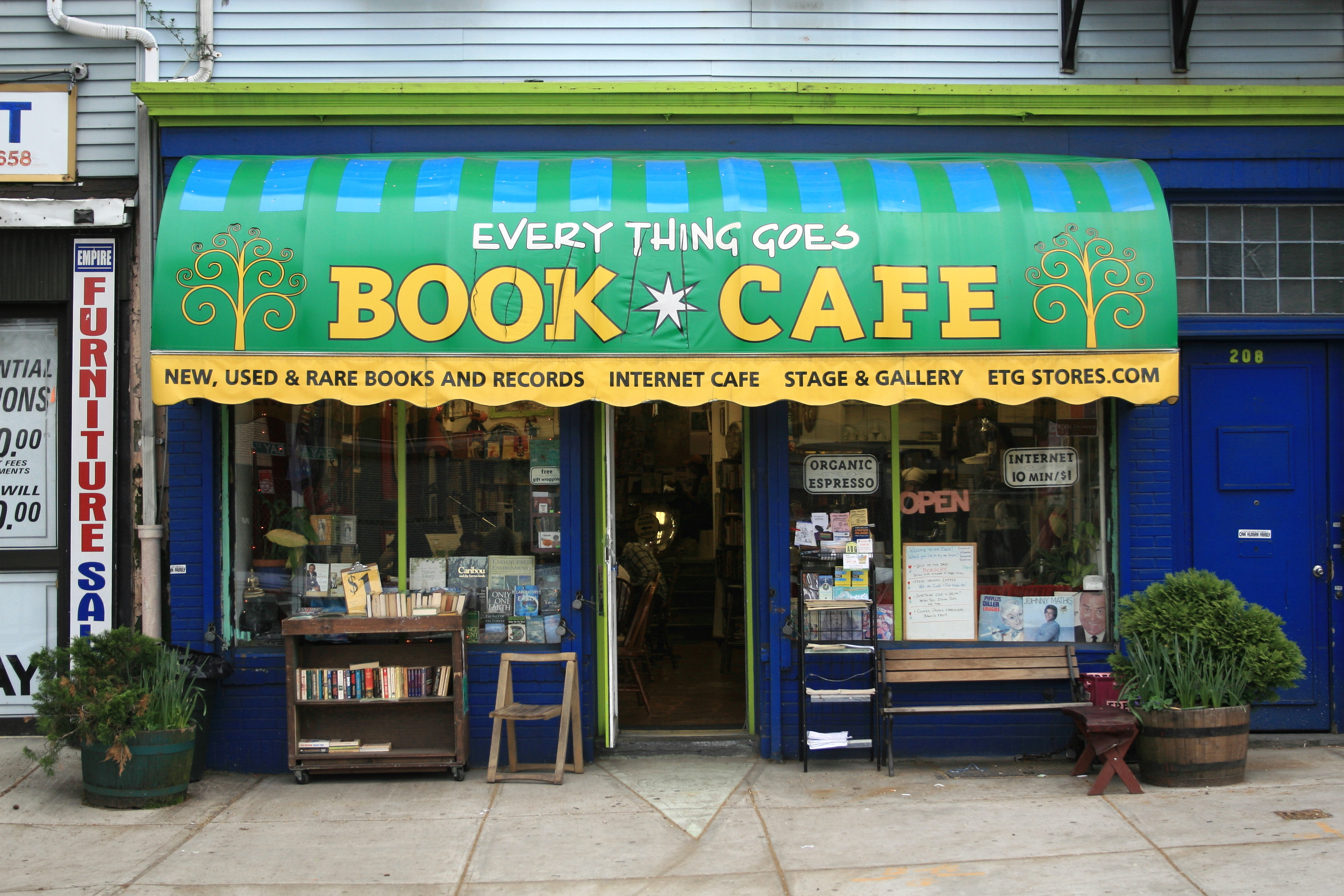
The "Every Thing Goes Book Cafe" on Staten Island

Though Ganas is portrayed as a commune in the media, only the core group participates in income and property sharing.

Ganas runs three stores under the name "Every Thing Goes" that are dedicated to the re-use and re-sale of used goods. The stores include a furniture store, a clothing store and a bookstore/cafe with a performance stage. The businesses support the community but are labor-intensive and only marginally profitable. For most of its life Ganas' income was declared on FFL's IRS form 990 for tax-exempt organizations. Since 2001 FFL has taken in an average of $475,000 in total annual revenue, including direct public support and program service revenue. FFL's program services are listed as "Feedback Learning Skills Development" and "Interpersonal Skills Development". FFL's revenues do not include income from their "Everything Goes" stores, as those are for-profit entities.

In late 2006 the core group reorganized as Ganas Community LLC, and began a new business called Ganas Food Company LLC. Mildred Gordon continued to draw an annual salary of $40,000 as the executive director of FFL. In 2007 the legal address of FFL changed from Ganas headquarters on Staten Island to Brooklyn, and the same year FFL's tax return declared only $15,550 in total revenue and $75 in direct public support. The following year total revenue fell to $2295 with direct public support of $0. Ganas has a real estate portfolio estimated at $10 million with holdings in upstate New York, Brooklyn, Virginia, California and Spain.

== Controversy ==
Two ex-members have made allegations about Ganas, including that it is a cult, that it pressures residents into sex and green-card marriages, and that "they control minds with drugs that are used by psychotherapists". Ganas opposes being described as a cult.

=== 2006 shooting ===
In May 2006 Ganas co-founder Jeff Gross was shot outside of his home on Ganas property. Gross survived and at trial identified the shooter as Rebekah Johnson, a former member who lived at Ganas periodically until she was evicted in 1996. Johnson's attorney denied that she had shot Gross, but said that she was "wrongfully accused by Gross as payback for portraying him as a brainwashing rapist and the commune as a kinky cult." Johnson had unsuccessfully sued the group for sexual harassment in 2000. In August 2008 Johnson was acquitted of all charges.

Jeff Gross left the group after the shooting, and filed several lawsuits against Ganas and Rebekah Johnson. Gross claimed that the leadership rejected his requests that the group upgrade security, that his personal daily schedule was published in a Ganas newsletter, and that he was "booted out" of Ganas in October 2007. Gross is seeking damages totaling over $20 million. A 2022 Esquire article followed up with Jeff, who was living in hiding. He was granted $1.3 million judgment against his shooter but it is outstanding.
