= Mildred Gordon (Ganas) =

Mildred Gordon (1922 – January 4, 2015) was the founder and executive director of the Foundation for Feedback Learning (FFL) and co-founder of the Ganas intentional community. She was the Communications Director of ActivistSolutions.org.
