= Mildred Seeley =

Mildred Seeley (1918 - 10 December 2001) was a doll collector, doll-related entrepreneur, and prolific author on the subjects of doll making and doll collecting.

== Life and work ==
Mildred Seeley lived in a "small village in upstate New York" and in Green Valley, Arizona. She never visited the countries where her beloved dolls were made. Yet, she built "an international network of doll lovers and a world-class doll collection." She is widely recognized as a primary force in raising the profile of antique doll collecting and increasing the value of antique dolls. In 1986, Mildred Seeley initiated the designation of the second Saturday in June as World Doll Day.

== Professional Accomplishments ==
In 1946 Mildred Seely founded Seeley's, a company which refers to itself as the leader in "the fascinating world of porcelain dollmaking and related arts." In 1977, Mildred Seeley co-founded the Doll Artisan Guild. The Doll Artisan Guild offers special recognition in dollmaking competition, including the "Millie" (named for Seeley). It also publishes the quarterly "DOLLS Beautiful" magazine. Seeley established a chain of franchised "Seeley Doll Studios". She also created lines of limited-edition doll-related collectors' plates, valued by both doll collectors and plate collectors, often featuring dolls from her own collection.

== Doll Collection ==
Mildred Seeley became known internationally for her collection of French dolls. When the collection sold in 2002, it set new world records (since broken) of US$1,800,000 for a single doll collection and US$215,000 for a single doll.

== Bibliography ==
Books

- Porcelain and Low-Fire Doll Making (1973)
- The Doll House Doll: Directions for Making Dolls (1977)
- The Doll Makers Work Book: French Dolls (1977)
- The Doll Makers Work Book: Baby Dolls, Volume I: German Dolls (1978)
- Making Reproduction Dolls for Profit (1979)
- Project-Milettes: Clones of Small French dolls (1982)
- Doll Collecting for Fun & Profit (1987)
- How to Collect French Bebe Dolls (1987)
- How to Collect French Fashion Dolls (1987)
- How to Make Money with Dolls (1987)
- Doll Costuming: How to Costume French & German Bisque Dolls (1990)
- German Children Dolls (1990)
- Judging Dolls: For Collectors, Doll Shows, Investment, Insuring, Appraising, Auction Buying, and Fun (1991)
- The Doll Makers Work Book: Lady Dolls (1991)
- The Complete Book of All-Bisque Dolls (1992)
- Fabulous French Bebes (1992)
- Milettes: Small French Dolls to Collect & Make (1993)
- For the Love of Dolls and Roses: A Story of the Author, Her Life, Her Successes, and Failures (1994)
- Beloved China Dolls (1996)
- Study of the Fashion Dolls of France (1996)
- Victorian Doll Secrets (1996)

Pamphlets

- The Doll House Doll: Stitching Craft Book (1976)
- Making Original Dolls and Molds (1977)

=== About Mildred Seeley ===
- Theriault, Florence. For The Love Of Dolls: The Legendary Collection of Mildred Seeley. Gold Horse Publishing. 2002. ISBN 978-1-931503-06-8
- Theriault, Florence. Magnifique: The Family Dolls of Mildred Seeley and Others. Theriault. 2005. ASIN B002HZWRAW
