= Mildred Hiltgen =

American politician (died 1990)

Member of the Connecticut House of Representatives from Coventry
- In office 1961–1963 Serving with Stephen Loyzim
- Preceded by: Stephen Loyzim; Charles N. Harlow Jr.
- Succeeded by: Walter L. Thorp Sr. Otto C. Miller

Personal details
- Born: Mildred C. Myers; 1908 or 1909 Hartford, Connecticut, U.S.
- Died: June 22, 1990 (aged 81) Hartford, Connecticut, U.S.
- Party: Democratic

Mildred C. Hiltgen (née Myers; died June 22, 1990) was an American politician who served in the Connecticut House of Representatives from 1961 to 1963, representing the town of Coventry as a Democrat.
