= Mick Raymer =

Australian cricketer

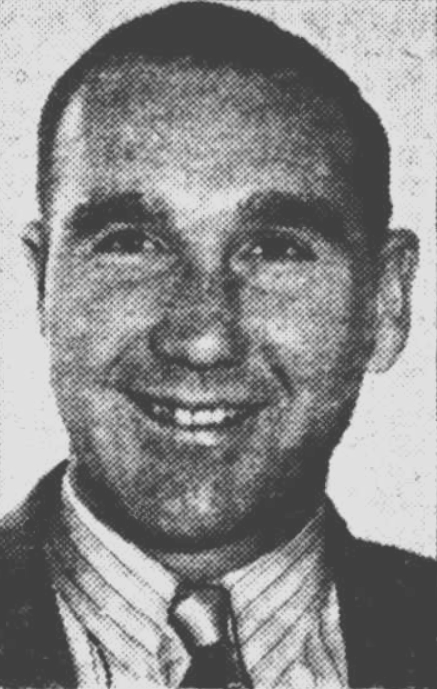

Personal information
- Full name: Vincent Norman Raymer
- Born: 4 May 1918; Toowoomba, Queensland
- Died: 31 October 2006 (aged 88); Toowoomba, Queensland
- Nickname: Mick
- Batting: Left-handed
- Bowling: Slow left-arm orthodox, left-arm medium-pace

Domestic team information
- Years: Team
- 1940/41–1956/57: Queensland

Career statistics
Competition	First-class
Matches	74
Runs scored	2262
Batting average	22.84
100s/50s	0/14
Top score	85
Balls bowled	17,827
Wickets	201
Bowling average	32.34
5 wickets in innings	6
10 wickets in match	1
Best bowling	7/100
Catches/stumpings	64/–
- Source: Cricinfo, 15 September 2019

Vincent Norman "Mick" Raymer (4 May 1918 – 31 October 2006) was a cricketer who played first-class cricket for Queensland from 1940 to 1956.

In the Second World War, Raymer served from 1940 to 1946, chiefly in New Guinea, as a private in the 61st Australian Infantry Battalion. An accident during his service left him partially deaf.

Solidly built, Raymer was a hard-hitting lower-order batsman and a left-arm orthodox bowler who sometimes bowled medium-pace. His best batting season was 1947–48, when he made 403 runs at an average of 44.77 and also made his highest score, 85 against Western Australia. He took his best match bowling figures, 10 for 160, in the same match, but Western Australia nevertheless won, thus securing the Sheffield Shield in their inaugural season.

Johnnie Moyes described Raymer as "a slowish left-hander with remarkable control of length and flight [who] did grand things for Queensland year after year". Raymer's most successful season with the ball was 1949–50, when he took 34 wickets at an average of 27.14. His best innings figures were 7 for 100 against South Australia in 1953–54, when he also made 84 in Queensland’s first innings.

Raymer played as Accrington’s professional in the Lancashire League in 1951 and 1952. In Queensland he played most of his cricket in his home town of Toowoomba, where he worked as a plasterer.
