= Henry Maddock =

British barrister and legal author (died 1824)

Henry Maddock (died 1824) was an English barrister and legal author.

== Life ==
The eldest son of Henry Maddock of Lincoln's Inn, barrister-at-law, resided for a time at, but took no degree from, St John's College, Cambridge. On 25 April 1796 he entered Lincoln's Inn, where he was called to the bar in Michaelmas term 1801, and afterwards practised as an equity draftsman. He died on Saint Lucia, in the West Indies, in August 1824.

== Works ==
Maddock published:

- The Power of Parliaments considered in a Letter to a Member of Parliament, London, 1799; an argument against the legislative union with Ireland, based on an alleged inherent incapacity of the Irish parliament to part with its own powers.
- A Vindication of the Privileges of the House of Commons, in answer to Sir Francis Burdett's Address, London, 1810.
- The first part of An Account of the Life and Writings of Lord Chancellor Somers, including Remarks on the Public Affairs in which he was engaged, and the Bill of Rights, with a Comment, London, 1812.
- A Treatise on the Principles and Practice of the High Court of Chancery, London, 1815, 2 vols.; a second edition, enlarged, appeared in 1820, and a third in 1837, 2 vols.
- Reports of Cases argued and determined in the Court of the Vice-Chancellor of England during the time of Sir Thomas Plumer, Knt., London, 1817–22, 5 vols.

== Notes ==
Attribution

This article incorporates text from a publication now in the public domain: Lee, Sidney, ed. (1893). "Maddock, Henry". Dictionary of National Biography. Vol. 35. London: Smith, Elder & Co.
