= Richard Maddocks =

Australian rules footballer and cricketer

Personal information
- Full name: Richard Ivor Maddocks
- Born: 30 July 1928; Carnegie, Melbourne
- Died: 10 September 1968 (aged 40); Blackburn, Victoria
- Batting: Right-handed
- Bowling: Left-arm
- Role: Middle-order batsman

Domestic team information
- Years: Team
- 1948/49–1956/57: Victoria

Career statistics
| Competition | First-class |
|---|---|
| Matches | 21 |
| Runs scored | 1227 |
| Batting average | 40.90 |
| 100s/50s | 2/4 |
| Top score | 271 |
| Balls bowled | 16 |
| Wickets | 1 |
| Bowling average | 9.00 |
| 5 wickets in innings | 0 |
| 10 wickets in match | 0 |
| Best bowling | 1/0 |
| Catches/stumpings | 17/1 |
- Source: CricketArchive, 24 April 2010

Richard Ivor Maddocks (30 July 1928 – 10 September 1968) was an Australian first-class cricketer who represented Victoria in the Sheffield Shield. He also played Australian rules football with North Melbourne in the Victorian Football League (VFL).

Maddocks, who also went by the first name of Dick, debuted at first-class level with Victoria in 1948. From the 1948–49 to 1951–52 seasons, he was restricted to non Sheffield Shield fixtures against Tasmania, who were yet to enter the competition. In the last of these matches, at the Melbourne Cricket Ground in February 1952, Maddocks scored his maiden first-class century and was involved in a record 343 run partnership with debutant Jeffrey Hallebone for the fifth wicket. He finished on 271, the second highest score made by a Victorian against Tasmania after Bill Ponsford.

Finally in 1953–54, Maddocks got his chance to play Sheffield Shield and took part in all seven matches Victoria played, scoring 345 runs at 28.75. He also took his only first-class wicket, in a match against New South Wales at the MCG. With the visitors chasing just 68 for victory in their fourth innings, Maddocks was allowed a bowl and dismissed opener Ron Briggs caught behind, by his brother and Test cricketer Len Maddocks. It was the only full season he would ever play but he also made some appearances in the 1955–56 and 1957–58 competitions.

Maddocks made his Victorian Football League appearances while still trying to break into the Victorian cricket team, during the 1948 VFL season. He played five games and kicked three goals for North Melbourne. He also represented the North Melbourne Cricket Club in district cricket, playing 239 times before his retirement in 1965. Also played baseball for Victoria, and once held a Victorian table tennis title.

In 1968 he died of a heart attack at the age of 40.
