= Expectancy challenge =

Sociological method

Expectancy challenge refers to the sociological method that involves challenging the expectancies people associate with a behavior pattern, in an effort to affect said person's actions in regard to said behavior. This is most recently seen with alcohol abuse patterns on college campuses. Drinking on college campuses is a well-studied, problematic behavior pattern resulting in personal and property damage, and irreparable life consequences. Research, articles to follow, have indicated that expectancy of outcomes has a large bearing on behavior patterns. In layman's terms, If a person believes negative outcomes will result, they are less likely to engage in the behavior yielding said outcomes. If positive outcomes are expected, a person is more likely to engage in the behavior yielding such outcomes. Expectancy challenge involves challenging a person's expectations of the results of certain behaviors, such as drinking. If the expectations a person associates with drinking are shifted from positive to negative, they are less likely to engage in drinking behaviors.
