= Joe Maddock =

Joe Maddock may refer to:

- Joe Maddock (coach) (1877–1943), college football player and coach
- Joe Maddock (rugby union) (born 1978), New Zealand rugby union player
