= Mildred Melrose =

American actress and dancer (1906–1952)

- Born: Mildred F. Melrose; 6 September 1906; Columbus, Ohio, U.S.
- Died: 23 November 1952 (aged 46); Buffalo, New York, U.S.
- Other names: Miss Personality; The Personality Girl; The Queen of the Black Bottom
- Occupations: Actress; dancer; vaudeville dancer; model
- Years active: 1920–1930

Mildred Melrose (September 6, 1906 – November 23, 1952) was an American actress, dancer, and vaudeville performer best known for performing the Charleston and the Black Bottom during the 1920s. She appeared in musical revues, vaudeville circuits, dance competitions, and theatrical engagements across the United States, Britain, and continental Europe. During her career, she was billed under promotional titles including Miss Personality, The Personality Girl, and The Queen of the Black Bottom.

== Early life ==
Mildred Melrose was born on September 6, 1906, in Columbus, Ohio. She grew up in a circus family known as the Riding Melroses and began performing in the family's circus at a young age. Her father died in 1925; her mother, Mrs. Owen A. Tootle, resided in Columbus. Melrose was also the niece of theatrical manager William "Billy" James. As a teenager, she began working on the legitimate stage in Columbus, appearing at Mrs. Temple's Theatre while participating in local dance events and competitions.

== Career ==
=== 1925–1926: Revues, vaudeville, and Broadway ===
By 1925, Melrose was established on the vaudeville and revue circuits, receiving notices in daily newspapers and theatrical trade papers as a prominent dancer of the period. In 1925, she appeared in Fashions, a stage production associated with Gene Mason that had previously been titled The Green Whirl. Later that year, she joined the Fanchon and Marco organization on the West Coast, performing in August 1925 in the revue The Haunting Melody. Promotional billing for the production advertised her as Miss Personality, and press notices highlighted her Charleston routines and stage presence.

Throughout 1925 and 1926, Melrose toured American vaudeville houses in cities including Los Angeles, St. Louis, and Detroit, where her engagement at the Broadway-Strand Theatre was held over for an extended run. Alongside her theater bookings, she appeared at public promotional events and dance contests. In December 1925, The Davenport Daily Times referred to her as a Charleston expert while reporting on her appearance as a judge at a dance contest in Davenport, Iowa. That same month Melrose had completed a screen test and attracted interest from motion picture producers. By July 1926, she had appeared in a Broadway production and was finalizing arrangements for a second Broadway engagement.

=== 1927: Britain and continental Europe ===
In 1927, Melrose traveled to Britain and performed in London, appearing in connection with entertainment at the Piccadilly Hotel, London. British advertisements and press notices billed her as The Personality Girl and The Queen of the Black Bottom. She was also advertised in connection with the revue White Birds at His Majesty's Theatre in London. While in Britain, she was filmed for the 1927 British Pathé newsreel The Real "Black Bottom" Dance.

Her 1927 overseas tour also included stage appearances in Paris and at the Lido in Venice. American newspapers covered her European engagements and connected her performances in London with the international spread of the Black Bottom dance craze. Later in 1927, Melrose returned to the United States.

=== 1929–1930: Later touring and retirement ===
Following her return from Europe, Melrose continued performing in touring revues and vaudeville units. In 1929, she appeared in the revue International Beauty. In 1930, she served as mistress of ceremonies for Dixie Valentines, a touring vaudeville production that played theater engagements in Rockford, Canton, and Indianapolis. During this period, she also appeared in a benefit performance in Detroit and took part in a publicity event alongside the Dixie Steppers at Lake Mendota in Madison, Wisconsin.

As demand for Jazz Age specialty acts declined in the early 1930s, Melrose chose not to renew her theater contracts upon expiration, declining offers to continue touring. She retired from the stage and moved to New York to live with her mother.

== Personal life ==
During the height of her vaudeville career, Melrose's personal life was occasionally the subject of press rumors. In February 1926, newspaper reports stated that she was engaged to orchestra leader Abe Lyman; Melrose denied the report, stating that Lyman was only a friend. In April 1926, press items claimed that she had married comedian Ray Nor in Uniontown, Pennsylvania, a report she likewise denied.

== Death ==
Melrose died in Buffalo, New York on November 23, 1952, at the age of 46.

== Filmography ==
=== Film ===
| Year | Title | Role | Notes |
|---|---|---|---|
| 1927 | The Real "Black Bottom" Dance | Miss Mildred | Short silent newsreel released by British Pathé on March 8, 1927. She appears and demonstrating the Black Bottom dance in a costume designed by Dolly Tree. |

== Stage ==
=== Theatre ===
| Year | Title | Role(s) | Venue(s) | Notes |
|---|---|---|---|---|
| 1924 | Toll of Justice | Herself | Wilbert Pictures Company | |
| 1925 | Fashions | Specialty Dancer | Touring (United States) | Stage production associated with Gene Mason, formerly titled The Green Whirl. |
| 1925 | The Haunting Melody | Featured Dancer ("Miss Personality") | West Coast Tour (United States) | Produced by the Fanchon and Marco organization (opened August 1925). |
| 1927 | White Birds | Advertised Performer | His Majesty's Theatre (London, England) | Advertised in connection with the London revue. |
| 1927 | European Cabaret & Stage Tour | Specialty Dancer | Paris, France & The Lido (Venice, Italy) | Performed across continental Europe before returning to the U.S. later in 1927. |
| 1929 | International Beauty | Featured Performer | Touring (United States) | Post-Europe touring musical revue. |
| 1930 | Dixie Valentines | Mistress of Ceremonies | Rockford, Canton, and Indianapolis | Touring vaudeville production; also performed a benefit in Detroit and a publicity event with the Dixie Steppers at Lake Mendota, Wisconsin. |
