= Sociology of leisure =

Study of how humans organize their free time

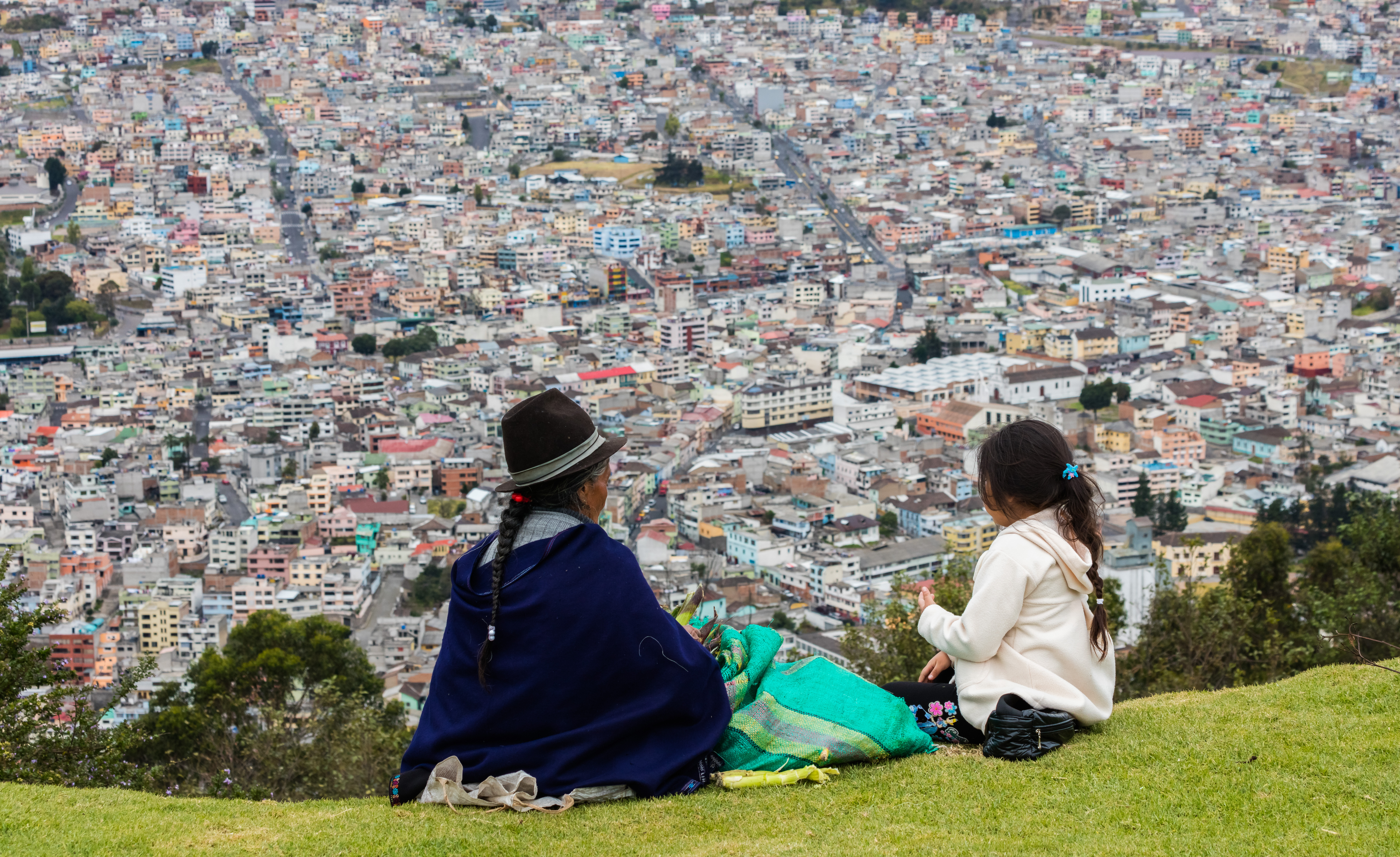
Indigenous people peeling maize while overlooking Quito from El Panecillo, Ecuador

The sociology of leisure or leisure sociology is the study of how humans organize their free time. Leisure includes a broad array of activities, such as sport, tourism, and the playing of games. The sociology of leisure is closely tied to the sociology of work, as each explores a different side of the work-leisure relationship. More recent studies in the field move away from this relationship, however, and focus on the relation between leisure and culture.

Studies of leisure have determined that observable patterns in human leisure behavior cannot be explained solely by socioeconomic variables such as age, income, occupation or education. The type of leisure activity is substantially influenced by the numerous more complex factors, such as presence or lack of family, religious beliefs and general cultural values one adheres to.

== Definitions and theoretical concerns ==
Its definitions are numerous and often mutually contradictory, for example as a discrete portion of one's time or as a quality of experience irrespective of time. Joffre Dumazedier distinguished four distinct definitions of leisure, which begin broadly and gradually narrow in scope:

1. Style of behavior that may occur even at work;
2. Any non-work activity;
3. Activities excluding family and household obligations;
4. Activities dedicated to self-fulfillment.

Dumazedier's four definitions are not exhaustive. Incompatible definitions and measures are seen as a major factor accounting for occasionally contradictory research findings.

There are some unresolved questions concerning the definition of work: in particular, whether unpaid endeavors, such as volunteering or studying, are work. Non-work time should not be equated with free time, as it comprises not only free time, dedicated to leisure, but also time dedicated to certain obligatory activities, such as housework. Dividing activities into free and dedicated time is not easy. For example, brushing one's teeth is neither work nor leisure; scholars differ in their classifications of activities such as eating a meal, shopping, repairing a car, attending a religious ceremony, or showering (various individuals may or may not classify such activities as leisure). The relation between work and leisure can also be unclear: research indicates that some individuals find skills that they have acquired at work useful to their hobbies (and vice versa), and some individuals have used leisure activities to advance their work careers. Sociologists also disagree as to whether political or spiritual activities should be included in studies of leisure. Further, among some occupational communities, such as police officers or miners, it is common for colleagues to be off-time friends and to share similar, work-based leisure activities.

Apart from a definition of leisure, there are other questions of theoretical concern to the sociologist of leisure. For example, quantifying the results is difficult, as time-budget studies have noted that a given amount of time (for example, an hour) may have different values, depending on when it occurs—within a day, a week, or a year. Finally, as with many other fields of inquiry in the social sciences, the study of the sociology of leisure is hampered by the lack of reliable data for comparative longitudinal studies, as there was little to no standardized data-gathering on leisure throughout most of human history. The lack of longitudinal studies has been remedied in the last few decades by recurring national surveys such as the General Household Survey in the United Kingdom (ongoing since 1971). In addition to surveys, an increasing number of studies have been focusing on qualitative methods of research (interviews).

Simply having free time cannot be considered leisure, as unemployed people usually have a lot of free time, yet their lack of professional activity may throw them in a state of anomie, ennui. In general, a lot of people spend most of their free time consuming social media content and videos online in an addictive manner, despite the negative repercussions on mental health, indicating that constructive leisure must be learned.

== History ==
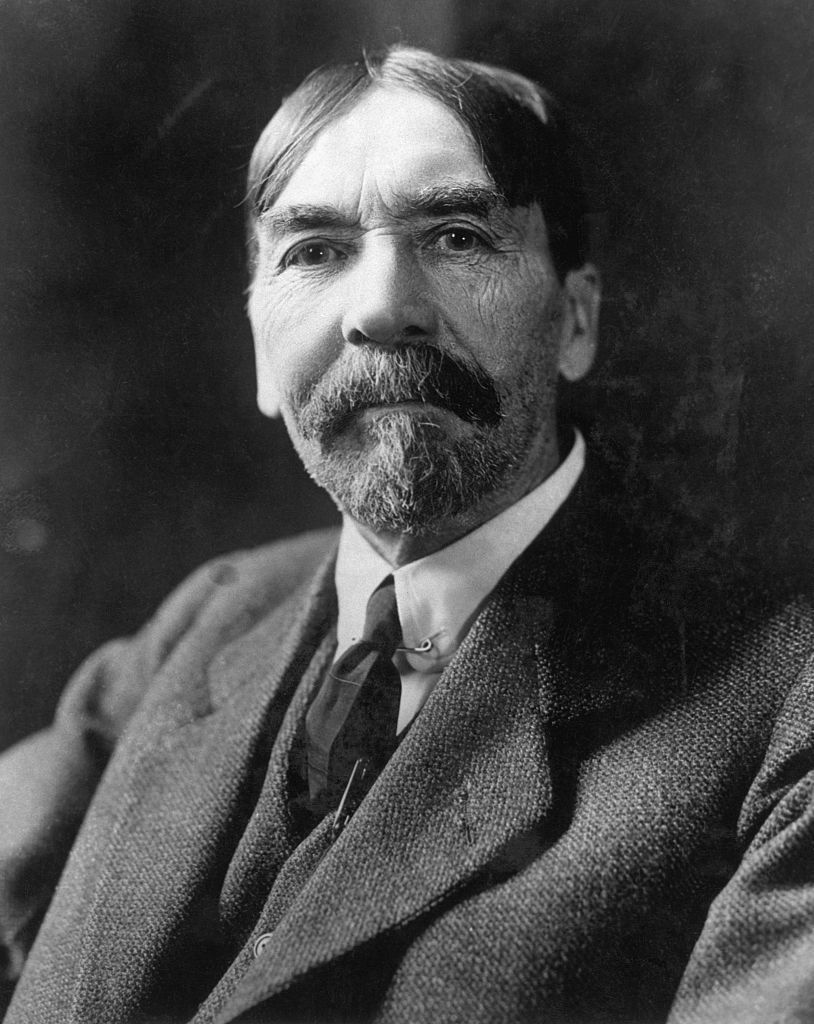
Thorstein Veblen was one of the first sociologists to study leisure.

Sociology of leisure is a fairly recent subfield of sociology, compared to more traditional subfields such as sociology of work, sociology of the family, or sociology of education: it saw most of its development in the second half of the 20th century.^{[a]} Until then, leisure had often been seen as a relatively unimportant, minor feature of society. Now, however, it is now recognized as a major social institution, deserving of serious sociological inquiry, particularly in Western societies.

One of the earliest theories of leisure originates from Karl Marx, whose theory was discussed through a 'realm of freedom'. Karl Marx's criticisms of capitalism, saw the structures of capital as in conflict with people truly reaching leisure. The basis of leisure is rooted in economics and politics, as those are intertwined also. In contrast to a more socialist approach, many would see leisure time as an excuse for unproductivity and as something you don't deserve. Not that it shouldn't be attained but shouldn't get in the way of economics. Therein lies our current structures that Marx's theories have not only remained relevant, but his criticisms of his time can remain true to this day. Marx's criticism of capitalism was rooted in the exploitation of the worker. As a conflict against the worker, class warfare in effect. In the Marx and Engels Reader, an overview of the writings and theories of Marxism, the 'realm of freedom' and 'realm of necessity' were heavily elaborated on as it was a new concept at the time. The realm of freedom is a true definition of leisure as it embraces doing activities out of the want, pleasure to do so. Whereas living to survive and work, eat, sleep would be in the realm of necessity.

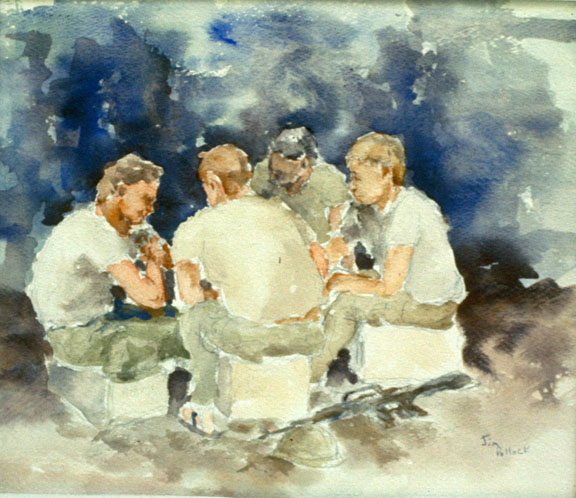
An example of a leisure activity: American soldiers playing a card game

Over time, emphasis in studies of leisure has shifted from the work-leisure relation, particularly in well-researched majorities, to study of minorities and the relation between leisure and culture. Marshall Gordon noted that there are two approaches in the study of leisure: formal and historical-theoretical. The formal approach focuses on empirical questions, such as the shifting of leisure patterns over an individual's life cycle, the relation between leisure and work, and specific forms of leisure (such as the sociology of sport). The historical-theoretical approach studies the relation between leisure and social change, often from structural-functionalist and neo-Marxist perspectives. Sheila Scraton provided a different analysis, comparing North American and British studies. The British approaches focus on input from pluralism, critical Marxism, and feminism; the American approaches concentrate on the social-psychological tradition. Rhona and Robert Rapoport studied the worklife balance and inequality in many countries, wrote many books in this area and help influence policy and legislation to change practices.

After World War II, leisure became a more concerning matter as automation began to replace jobs, leaving only leisure to fill the void. The goal was to identify new "productive and self-fulfilling free-time pursuits" to maintain the "feverish pursuit of happiness" of the 20th century. Sociologist Robert A. Stebbins coined the term "serious leisure" where a professional path and meaning is first found by following personal interests and then building a business out of it. The study Leisure in America: A Social Inquiry (Kaplan & Wiley, 1964) explored this post-war "recreation explosion".

== Findings ==
Many sociologists have assumed that a given type of leisure activity is most easily explained by socioeconomic variables such as income, occupation or education. This has yielded fewer results than expected; income is associated with total money spent on such activities, but otherwise only determines what type of activities are affordable. Occupation has a similar effect, because most occupations heavily influence a person's income (for example, membership in a prestigious occupation and "country-club" activities such as golf or sailing are significantly correlated—but so is membership in those occupations and high income, and those activities with high cost). Education is correlated with having a wide range of leisure activities, and with higher dedication to them. As Kelly noted, "Predicting a person's leisure behavior on the basis of his socioeconomic position is all but impossible."

On the other hand, type of leisure activity is substantially influenced by the individual's immediate situation—whether they have a family, whether there are recreational facilities nearby, and age. Early family influences, particularly involving the more social leisure activities, can be profound. The type of leisure activity also depends on the individual's current place in the life cycle.

Within the framework of the family, leisure time has been researched to measure the effect of families during weekend work. What was found was families in which parents had to work on the weekend had a negative effect on the family, more particularly the children. It was written that many of the parents who had to work on the weekend were less educated and had lower income. This could have implications for the family and society.

Specific findings in sociological studies of leisure are illustrated by John Robinson's late-1970s study of American leisure. Robinson found that Americans, on average, have four hours of leisure time each weekday, and more on weekends—six hours on Saturdays, almost eight on Sundays. Amount of leisure time diminishes with age, work, marriage, and children. However, the amount of free time does not significantly depend on an individual's wealth. People desire less free time if they are uncertain of their economic future, or if their job is their central interest. During the second half of the twentieth century, watching television became a major leisure activity, causing a substantial decrease in the time dedicated to other activities; in the early 1970s the average American had 4 hours of leisure per day, and spent 1.5 of them watching television. Shared leisure activities increase marital satisfaction.

There are different forms of leisure time and their benefits are not always clear, but generally, there is consensus that in moderation, they tend to have various positive effects. For example, going to the movies, alone or with friends can improve health and well-being.

== Pay, work and leisure ==
Individuals make trade-offs between pay, work and leisure. However, the timing and scale of those trade-offs varies with the occupations and incomes of individuals. They also vary over time and from society to society. In societies, substantial across the board rises in pay can increase the working hours of male blue-collar workers with young children but reduce those of middle class women with husbands in well-paid full-time jobs.

== See also ==
- Sociological investigations of leisure on the Internet
- Rhona Rapoport
- Ikigai

== Notes ==
a There were few sociological studies of leisure before the second half of the 20th century. One of the earliest and most celebrated was Thorstein Veblen's The Theory of the Leisure Class (1899).
