= Mildred Parten Newhall =

American sociologist

Mildred B. Parten Newhall
- Born: August 4, 1902
- Died: May 26, 1970 (aged 67)
- Education: University of Minnesota
- Known for: Parten's stages of play
- Spouse: Sidney M. Newhall
- Scientific career
- Fields: Sociology
- Workplaces: University of Rochester
- Thesis: An Analysis of Social Participation, Leadership, and other Factors in Preschool Play Groups (1929)
- Doctoral advisor: F. Stuart Chapin

Mildred Bernice Parten Newhall (August 4, 1902 – May 26, 1970) was an American sociologist, a researcher at University of Minnesota's Institute of Child Development.

She completed her doctoral dissertation in 1929. In it she developed the theory of six stages of child's play, which led to a series of influential publications.

Newhall was one of the first to conduct extensive studies on children for the case of play. She supervised children between two and five years old for intense one-minute periods. In these time frames, she could see the different children's behavior and documented them accordingly. She noted that most of the play is by themselves, in the first four stages. The latter two are more extensive sets of play, and occur in older age groups which involve more interaction between children.

She was married to Sidney Newhall, a researcher for Eastman Kodak in Rochester, New York. Mildred Parten Newhall was a research associate in psychology at the University of Rochester and died in 1970.
