= Madoc (disambiguation) =

Madoc, in Welsh folklore, is a prince who sailed to the Americas .

Madoc or Madog may also refer to:

== People ==
=== People in Welsh history ===
- Madog Elfed (c. 600), a hero mentioned in the medieval Welsh poem Y Gododdin
- Madog ap Rhiryd (12th-century), prince of part of Powys
- Madog ap Maredudd (died 1160), the last prince of a united Kingdom of Powys
- Princes of Powys Fadog in north-east Wales:
  - Madog ap Gruffydd Maelor, son of Madog ap Maredudd, prince 1191–1236
  - Madog II ap Gruffydd, Lord of Dinas Bran, son of Gruffydd II ap Madog, prince 1269–1277
  - Madog Crypl, grandson of Madog II ap Gruffydd, prince 1289–1304, sometimes known as Madog III
  - Madog Fychan, probably son of Madog Crypl, prince 1304–c.1325
- Madog ap Llywelyn (13th-century), prince of the Kingdom of Gwynedd
- Madoc ap Uthyr, a legendary figure, son of Uther Pendragon and brother of King Arthur

=== Other people ===
- Philip Madoc (1934–2012), Welsh actor
- Ruth Madoc (1943–2022), British actress and singer

== Places ==
- Madoc, Ontario (township), a township in Canada
  - Madoc, Ontario (village), a nearby village
- Madog River, in Guam
- Maen Madoc, a menhir (standing stone) in the Brecon Beacons, South Wales

== Other uses ==
- Madoc (poem), an 1805 poem by Robert Southey

== See also ==
- Maedoc, the equivalent Irish name
- Maddock (disambiguation)
- Mad Dog (disambiguation)
