= Rhona Rapoport =

South African social scientist

- Born: 29 January 1927; Cape Town, South Africa
- Died: 24 November 2011 (aged 84)
- Education: University of Cape Town; London School of Economics
- Known for: Social Science; Research on work life balance

Rhona Valerie Rapoport (29 January 1927 – 24 November 2011) was a South African social scientist known for her research into work-life balance. Rapoport's 60 years of research and writing focused on work, life, gender, equity, and diversity. She did this by working closely with her husband and government agencies in a number of different countries.

== Biography ==
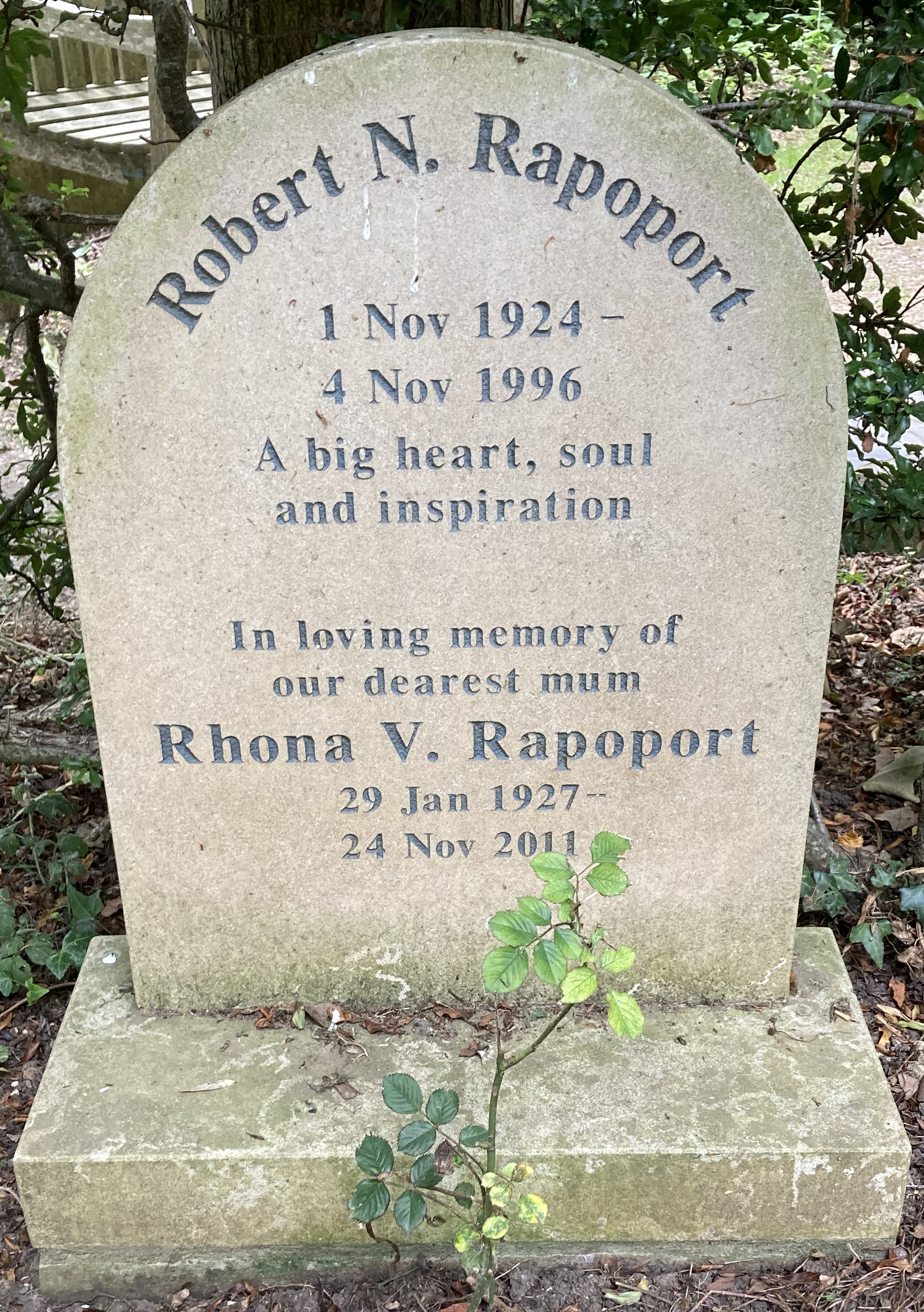
Grave of Rhona Rapoport in Highgate Cemetery

Rapoport was born as Rhona Ross in Cape Town, South Africa. She earned an undergraduate degree in social sciences from the University of Cape Town in 1946, and a PhD in sociology from the London School of Economics. Rapoport trained to be a psychoanalyst at the London Institute of Psychoanalysis.

In 1957, Rhona married social anthropologist Robert Rapoport. They lived in Boston, Massachusetts, where Rhona was the Director of Family Research at the community mental health program of the Harvard Medical School and the School of Public Health. In the mid-1960s, the couple moved to work with the Tavistock Institute in London and in 1973, they established the Institute of Family and Environmental Research in London. She worked at the Centre for Gender in Organizations at the Simmons Graduate School of Management in Boston during the 1990s and wrote or co-wrote more than 20 books.

For two decades, Rapoport worked as a consultant for the Ford Foundation, where she developed the technique of action research to support the participants in her studies. In 2009, she was honoured by the organization Working Families "for her sustained and influential research and new thinking in the field of work and family life".

Rapoport died in 2011. Her ashes were buried with her husband's on the eastern side of Highgate Cemetery.

== Personal life ==
Rhona was married to Robert Rapoport (1924-1996). They had two children together.

== Bibliography ==
- Robert N. Rapoport; Rhona Rapoport; Irving Rosow (1960). Community as Doctor: New Perspectives on a Therapeutic Community. Tavistock Publications.
- Rapoport, Rhona (1977). Dual-career families re-examined : new integrations of work & family. New York: Harper & Row. ISBN 0-06-090521-2. OL 4578580M.
- Rapoport, Rhona (1977). Fathers, mothers and society: towards new alliances. New York: Basic Books. ISBN 0-465-02366-5. OL 4899775M.
- Dower, Michael (1981). Leisure provision and people's needs. London: H.M.S.O. ISBN 0-11-751490-X. OL 3859448M.
- Robert N. Rapoport; Michael P. Fogarty; Rhona Rapoport (eds.) (1985). Families in Britain. Routledge & Kegan Paul. ISBN 0-7100-9236-9.
- Rapoport, Rhona (1996). Relinking life and work: toward a better future. New York: Ford Foundation. ISBN 0-7881-4582-7. OL 12151385M.
- Gambles, Richenda (2006). The myth of work-life balance: the challenge of our time for men, women, and societies. Chichester, England Hoboken, NJ: John Wiley & Sons. ISBN 0-470-09462-1. OL 7595933M.
- Fogarty, Michael P. (6 January 2017). Sex, Career and Family. Routledge. doi:10.4324/9781315276267. ISBN 978-1-315-27626-7. OL 27842083M.
- Rapoport, Rhona (2019). Leisure and the family life cycle. Abingdon, Oxon: Routledge. ISBN 978-0-429-63879-4. OL 11240070M.
