= William Maddocks =

William Maddocks may refer to:

- William Madocks (1773–1828), English Member of Parliament
- Bill Maddocks (1921–1992), English trade union leader

== See also ==
- William Maddox (disambiguation)
