= Mildred Maddocks =

Mildred Agnes Maddocks (3 August 1881 – 17 May 1955), also known as Mildred Agnes Maddocks Bentley, was an American cooking journalist and writer. She was head of the Good Housekeeping Institute.

== Biography ==
Maddocks was approached by Corning Glass Works to trial the prototype product, Pyrex. She endorsed the product in magazine articles and by giving cooking demonstrations in department stores across the country. In her role as director of the Good Housekeeping Institute, she wrote The Consumer Viewpoint, explaining what women look for when buying domestic appliances such as an iron, a vacuum cleaner, washing machine and refrigerator.

== Publications ==
- Maddocks, M., & Rumford Chemical Works. (1911). Rumford receipt book. Providence, R.I: Rumford Chemical Works.
- Maddocks, M. (1914). The Pure Food Cook Book ... Edited by M. Maddocks, etc. Hearst's International Library Co: New York.
- Maddocks, M. (1930). Good housekeeping cook book: Good housekeeping recipes, just how to buy, just how to cook. Toronto: McClelland & Stewart.
