= Ian Maddocks =

Australian cricketer (born 1951)

Personal information
- Born: 12 April 1951 (age 75); Melbourne, Australia

Domestic team information
- Years: Team
- 1977-1982: Victoria
- Source: Cricinfo, 6 December 2015

Ian Maddocks (born 12 April 1951) is an Australian former cricketer. He played 22 first-class cricket matches for Victoria between 1977 and 1982.

== See also ==
- List of Victoria first-class cricketers
