= Maddox (surname) =

Maddox is an English and Welsh surname. Notable people with the surname include:

- Allen Maddox (1948–2000), England-born New Zealand painter
- Alton H. Maddox Jr. (1945–2023), American lawyer
- Alva Hugh Maddox (1930–2020), American jurist
- Andre Maddox (born 1982), American football player
- Anthony Maddox (born 1978), American football player
- Austin Maddox (born 1991), American baseball player
- Avonte Maddox (born 1996), American football player
- Bob Maddox (born 1949), American football player
- Brad Maddox (born 1984), American wrestler
- Brenda Maddox (1932–2019), American writer
- Bronwen Maddox (born 1963), British journalist
- Bruno Maddox (born 1969), British literary novelist and journalist
- Charles Milles Maddox (1934–2017), birth name of American criminal and cult leader Charles Manson
- Christine Maddox (born 1950), American model
- Claude Maddox (1901–1958), American mobster
- Conroy Maddox (1912–2005), British painter
- Curtis Maddox (1935–2018), American football and basketball coach
- Cynthia Maddox (born 1941), American model
- David M. Maddox (born 1938), American general
- Douglas B. Maddox (born 1966), American film producer
- Edgar Maddox (1878–1923), Australian-Australian footballer
- Elliott Maddox (born 1947), American baseball player
- Eric Maddox, collected intelligence that directly led to the capture of Saddam Hussein
- Ernest Maddox (1863–1933), British surgeon and ophthalmologist
- Etta Haynie Maddox (1860–1933), American mezzo-soprano, lawyer and suffragist
- Eva Maddox, US interior designer
- Everette Maddox (1944–1989), American poet
- Ford Madox Ford (1873–1939), British writer
- Garry Maddox (born 1949), American baseball player
- Gene Maddox (1938–2015), American politician
- George Maddox (disambiguation), several people
- Halley G. Maddox (1899–1977), American general
- Isaac Maddox (1697–1759), British cleric and theologian
- J. C. Maddox (1932–2009), American politician
- Jacob Maddox (born 1998), British footballer
- Jack Maddox (1919–2006), American basketball player
- Jim Maddox (1938-2023), American politician
- John Maddox (disambiguation), several people
- Julius Maddox (born 1987), American powerlifter
- Kareem Maddox (born 1989), American basketball player
- Ken Maddox (born 1964), American politician
- Lester Maddox (1915–2003), American politician
- Lew Maddox (1924–2008), American politician
- Marion Maddox (1965–2025), Australian writer
- Mark Maddox (born 1968), American football player
- Michael Maddox (1747–1822), British businessman
- Nick Maddox (1886–1954), baseball player
- Nigel Maddox, Royal Air Force air vice-marshal
- Ralph Maddox (1908–1944), American football player
- Randy L. Maddox (born 1953), American Methodist minister and theologian
- Richard Leach Maddox (1816–1902), British photographer
- Robert Maddox (1870–1965), American politician
- Robert Maddox (American football) (born 1954), American football coach and player
- Rose Maddox (1925–1998), American country singer
- Sam Maddox (died 1979), British trade unionist
- Sean Maddox (born 1983), British writer
- Scott Maddox (born 1968), American politician
- Tito Maddox (born 1981), American basketball player
- Tom Maddox (1945–2022), American writer
- Tommy Maddox (born 1971), American football player
- Walt Maddox (born 1972), American politician
- William A. T. Maddox (1814–1889), American marine
- William J. Maddox Jr (1921–2001), American general and aviator
- Yvonne Maddox, American medical researcher

== See also ==
- Maddix, surname
- Maddocks, surname
- Maddox (given name)
- Maddox baronets
- Maddux (surname)
- Madox, given name and surname
