= Hell's Angel (TV programme) =

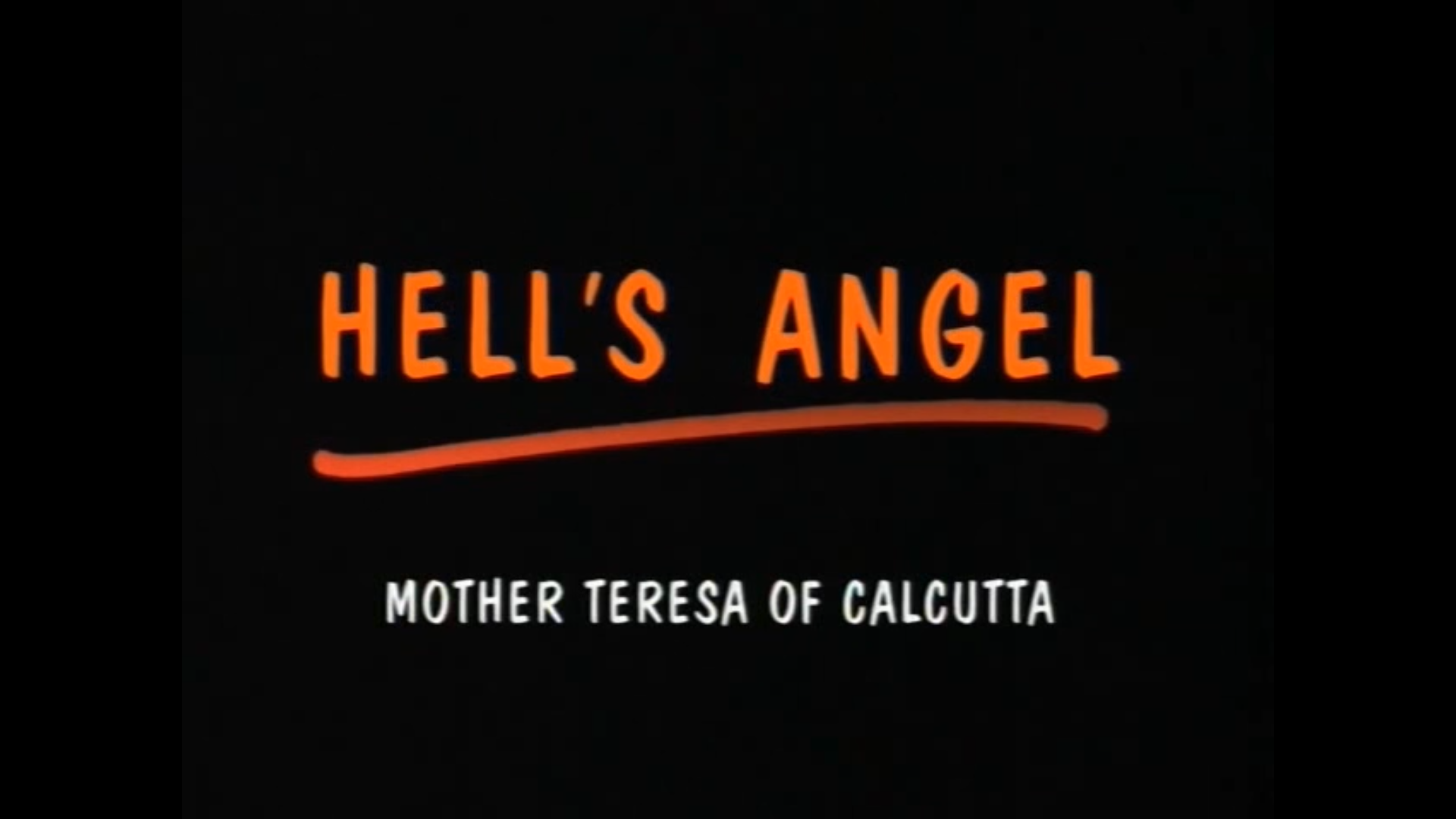
- Written by: Christopher Hitchens, Tariq Ali
- Directed by: Jenny Morgan
- Narrated by: Christopher Hitchens
- Country of origin: United Kingdom
- Original language: English

Production
- Producer: Tariq Ali
- Running time: 24 minutes

Original release
- Network: Channel 4
- Release: 8 November 1994

Hell's Angel is a television documentary programme criticising Mother Teresa which premiered in the UK on Channel 4's Without Walls arts strand on 8 November 1994. It was hosted by Christopher Hitchens, directed by Jenny Morgan, and produced by journalist Tariq Ali. Hitchens and Ali co-wrote the programme's script. Hitchens originally titled the documentary Sacred Cow, but the film's backers instead chose Hell's Angel as the title.

A precursor to Hitchens' book The Missionary Position: Mother Teresa in Theory and Practice (1995), the film argues that Mother Teresa urged the poor to accept their circumstances as their destiny and for the poor and sick in particular to submit to the substandard, unsafe, and non-therapeutic medical care provided by her clinics while she endorsed and accepted money from a variety of rich and powerful people who had stunning ethical lapses.

== Context ==
Hell's Angel stands as an opposition voice to what its creators perceived as the largely fawning and unquestioning press coverage of Mother Teresa at the time. Of the prior and contemporary press coverage, it states: "This profane marriage between tawdry media hype and medieval superstition gave birth to an icon which few have since had the poor taste to question." Aroup Chatterjee's criticisms of Mother Teresa inspired the creation of the film.

== Synopsis ==
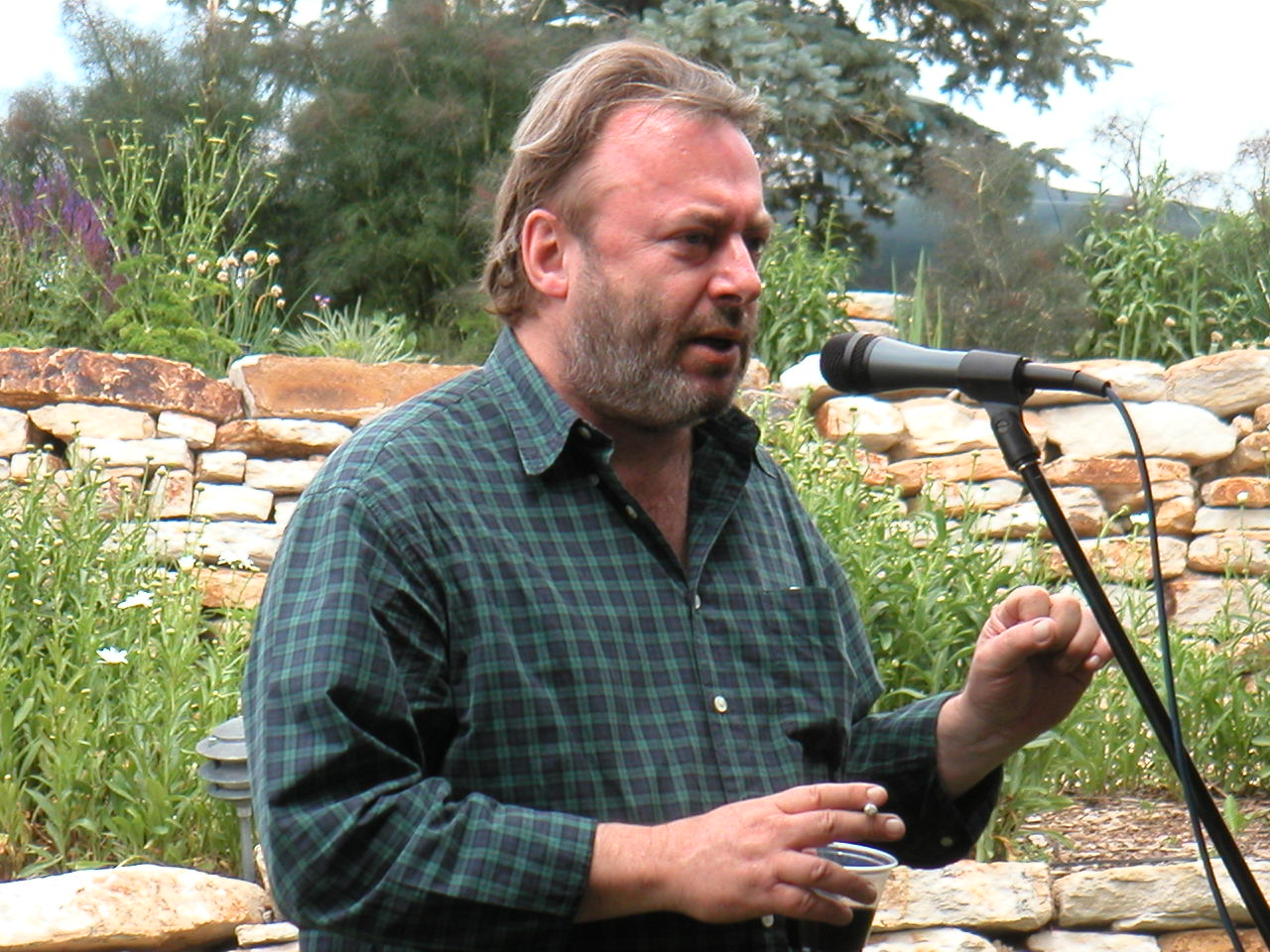
Christopher Hitchens

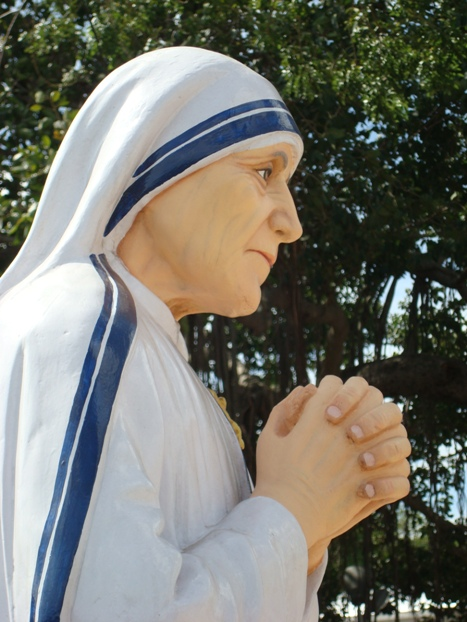
Statue of Mother Teresa at St. Thomas Mount, Chennai, India

Christopher Hitchens narrates the documentary on camera, introducing and explaining a series of video clips to make a case against Mother Teresa and her enterprise. The documentary's key claims and points are:

- The media's credulous reporting on Mother Teresa started with a 1969 BBC documentary by Malcolm Muggeridge called Something Beautiful for God. It reported on Mother Teresa's Home for the Dying in Kolkata, India. Some parts of the documentary were successfully filmed in dark interior spaces and Muggeridge claimed that the ability to see details in the film was due to Mother Teresa's "divine light." However, the camera operator at the time, Ken McMillan, is interviewed and says the real explanation was that a new, higher-sensitivity film from Kodak was being used.
- Mary Loudon, a writer and former volunteer at the Home for the Dying, says in an interview that it reminded her of photos she had seen of World War I facilities. There were basic cots but no chairs, no garden, and no yard. The dying patients were not being given any medication other than Aspirin or Ibuprofen. She also relayed a story about how drip needles were not sterilised between uses because the nuns saw no benefit to it and a story about how a sick, but treatable, 15-year-old boy should have been sent to the local hospital for help but the nuns refused.
- Hitchens relates that in 1980 Mother Teresa said that the Home for the Dying is "how we fight abortion and contraception in Kolkata." In her 1979 acceptance speech for the Nobel Peace Prize, Mother Teresa is shown calling abortion murder and the "greatest destroyer of peace." She is also shown saying that abortion and birth control should remain illegal in Ireland. Hitchens charges that "a campaign against family planning is low on the list of Kolkata's many pressing needs" and that Mother Teresa's "tenderness" toward the unborn should be seen as an overtly political position since she also campaigns against birth control.
- Mihir Bose, author & journalist, explains in an interview that the people of the West see Mother Teresa as one of them, making sacrifices for the poor in the third world and rescuing them.
- Mother Teresa is documented as having supported and been rewarded by Jean-Claude "Baby Doc" Duvalier (Haiti), Enver Hoxha (Albania), Charles Keating (U.S.), and Ronald Reagan (U.S.); all of whom had a need to publicly gloss over their various shortcomings.
- After the Union Carbide disaster in Bhopal, India, Mother Teresa's advice to the victims was merely to "forgive." Mihir Bose says that this shows how Mother Teresa is wholly uninterested in improving the lives of the poor in the world and tackling the problems of poverty.

== Reception ==
The documentary was seen by 1.6 million viewers. The programme "sparked an international debate" on Mother Teresa's work as its reporting contradicted the feel-good Mother Teresa narrative promulgated by the media. 130 complaints were submitted to the Independent Television Commission, which took no action. Hitchens reported that it led to "venomous and irrational attacks."

== Follow up ==
Christopher Hitchens' 1995 book, The Missionary Position: Mother Teresa in Theory and Practice, detailed and expanded on many of the same points made in the film.

Mother Teresa forgave the documentary's creators for making it. Christopher Hitchens criticized that forgiveness, saying it was "odd, since we had not sought forgiveness from her or from anyone else. Odder still if you have any inclination to ask by what right she assumes the power to forgive."

Mother Teresa died in 1997. Aroup Chatterjee and Christopher Hitchens took the position of 'devil's advocates', or Promoters of Justice (promotor iustitiae), in the Catholic Church's beatification procedures for Mother Teresa in 2003. She was canonized as a Roman Catholic saint in 2016. Sanal Edamaruku and others have argued against the two miracles that were required for her canonization and credited to her.

Gëzim Alpion wrote the critical book Mother Teresa: Saint or Celebrity? (2007) and Aroup Chatterjee wrote Mother Teresa: The Final Verdict (2003) which was reissued as Mother Teresa: The Untold Story in 2016.
