= Maddux =

Maddux may refer to:

- Maddux (statistic), a baseball statistic named after Greg Maddux
- Maddux (surname)
- Maddux Air Lines, former airline in Southern California
- Maddux Madsen (born 2003), American football player
- Maddux Trujillo (born 2003), American football player

== See also ==
- Maddix (disambiguation)
- Maddox (disambiguation)
