= Maddox =

Maddox may refer to:

== People ==
- Maddox (given name)
- Maddox (surname)
- Maddox (writer), American writer of "The Best Page in the Universe"

== Fiction ==
- Jamie Madrox, fictional character in the Marvel Comics universe
- Maddox Fisk, fictional character in the Fablehaven novels by Brandon Mull
- Bruce Maddox, fictional character in the Star Trek universe

== Places ==
- Maddox, Maryland
- Maddox, Tennessee

== Other uses ==
- Maddox Brothers and Rose, American band
- Maddox Industrial Transformer, American company
- USS Maddox (disambiguation)

== See also ==
- Maddock (disambiguation)
- Madoc (disambiguation)
- Maddix (disambiguation)
- Maddux (disambiguation)
- Madoxx, stage name for Ugandan roots reggae musician David Amon Ssemanda Ssematimba
