= Aroup Chatterjee =

Indian academic (born 1958)

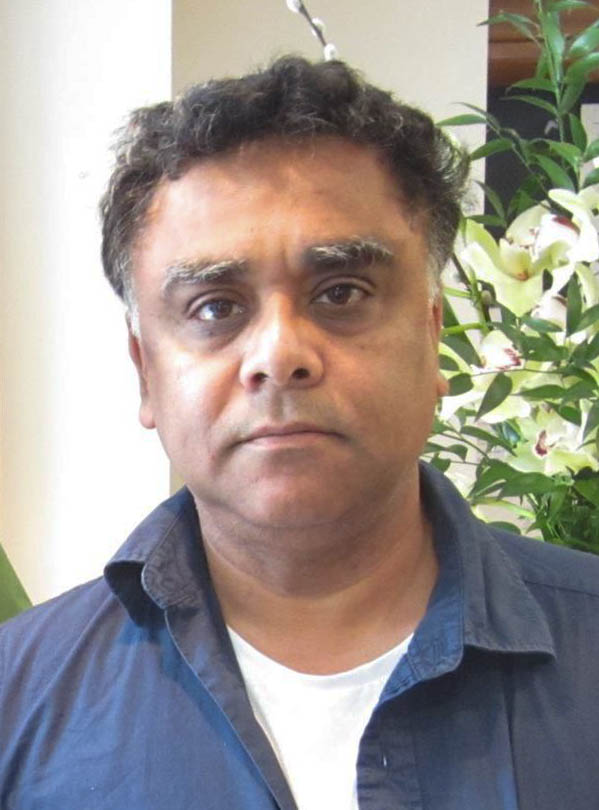
- Chatterjee in 2013
- Born: 23 June 1958 (age 68); Ballygunge, Calcutta, India
- Occupations: Author, physician
- Spouse: Zelpha Kittler
- Children: 3

Aroup Chatterjee (born 23 June 1958) is a British Indian author and physician. He was born in Calcutta, and moved to the United Kingdom in 1985. He is the author of the book Mother Teresa: The Untold Story (originally published as Mother Teresa: The Final Verdict), a work which challenges the widespread regard of Mother Teresa as a symbol of philanthropy and selflessness.

Chatterjee's criticism inspired the documentary Hell's Angel that was shown on Channel 4, a British television channel. The documentary was written by a well-known critic of Mother Teresa, Christopher Hitchens, who co-produced it with journalist and filmmaker Tariq Ali. Chatterjee and Hitchens were the two Devil's advocates, or hostile witnesses to Catholic Church procedures for the beatification of Mother Teresa in 2003.

== Life and career ==
Chatterjee was born in 1958 and raised in the city of Calcutta, West Bengal, India, before moving to the United Kingdom in 1985. In the 1970s and 1980s while studying at Calcutta Medical College he worked part-time for a left-wing political party campaigning against poverty and later worked at a hospital where he regularly treated patients from the oldest and poorest districts of the city as well as refugees from the civil war with what is now Bangladesh. Later, while living in the UK, he became concerned by the increasingly common portrayal of the widespread destitution and disease in his native Calcutta which stemmed from press reporting of the work of Mother Teresa. At that point he describes his attitude to Mother Teresa as "If anything, I was positively inclined towards her" although he says he never saw any of her nuns in the slums. However it was this image at odds with his own experience as a doctor in Calcutta that caused him to look more closely at her work and reputation.

I was mystified and perturbed. So I wanted to look into it ... still I thought she was a superb lady who was not faultless, but somehow, this image of Calcutta had permeated the world imagery. I thought it was probably a kind of offshoot or a corollary of her image and it was not her doing.

From the 1990s onwards he began to uncover what he calls a "cult of suffering" which Mother Teresa and her followers in the Missionaries of Charity were running back in Calcutta supported by her friend Pope John Paul II. In February 1993, Chatterjee sent a proposal for a short documentary to Vanya Del Borgo, associate producer of Bandung Productions which was owned by Tariq Ali. The proposal was passed to a Channel 4 commissioner who approved it, and Del Borgo with Chatterjee's proposal began work, approaching journalist and author Christopher Hitchens to write and present it. The documentary became the 1994 film Hell's Angel. Chatterjee found the documentary "too sensationalist" and Hitchens went on to write his book The Missionary Position. Chatterjee spent the next year travelling and interviewing people who had worked closely with Mother Teresa and the Missionaries of Charity and began to campaign against the conditions in Nirmal Hriday, also known as the Kalighat Home for the Dying in Calcutta. In particular he heard stories of lack of basic hygiene, the absence of any pain medication and the frequent reuse of hypodermic needles. Chatterjee then began work on a book, eventually released by Meteor Books in 2002 under the original title Mother Teresa: The Final Verdict. Chatterjee says in addition to the hours of interviews, "I started in pre Internet days and I spent months in libraries in London. I also travelled the world researching it. I followed slum dwellers, beggars, destitute children with a video camera. I interviewed hundreds of people. I stood with video camera outside Teresa's home for hours."

Following the publication of his book, Chatterjee continued to speak out against what he calls the "bogus and fantastic figure" of Mother Teresa, acting as Devil's advocate in the ongoing discourse about her sainthood.

In 2019, Chatterjee moved to Sydney, Australia where he lives with his Irish wife (who was raised as a Catholic) and their three children, and continues to work as a physician.

== Mother Teresa: The Untold Story ==
In December 2002 independent publisher Meteor Books, owned by Bhagbat Chakraborty, published Chatterjee's book under the title Mother Teresa: The Final Verdict. In 2016 the same book was reissued under a new title, Mother Teresa: The Untold Story by Fingerprint! publishers after being taken up by literary agent Kanishka Gupta. The book covers her life and her rise to fame following the documentary Something Beautiful for God by Malcolm Muggeridge, the Calcutta home for the dying and the practices of running it, the non-consensual death bed baptisms of Hindus and Muslims, the pathetic hygienic practices in the homes run by her, her very limited connections with Kolkata and the masses and the vast amount of financial donations given to the charity but not spent at Nirmal Hriday. He covers her Nobel Peace Prize and the speech in which she claimed to have saved tens of thousands of destitute people; Chatterjee estimates in his book the real number was 700. He also writes about the celebrities and the powerful people who had audiences with her, and the controversies surrounding the money she accepted from dictators such as Haitian president Jean-Claude Duvalier, convicted fraudster Charles Keating and disgraced publisher Robert Maxwell. The book looks at the worldwide reach of the Missionaries of Charity and examines the available evidence for her financial accounts along with her personal crusade against abortion and contraception. He blames the West, especially the United States, for creating her benevolent image as a saviour in the backdrops of a ravaged subcontinent. The final chapters address her death, funeral and beatification and Chatterjee's own involvement as an official Devil's advocate or hostile witness and the transcripts of the proceedings. Chatterjee sums up his view of Mother Teresa's life's work as:

Principally, she was a ... medieval ideologue – who taught that abortion had to be banned at any cost. And any means could serve to achieve that end. That was her.

=== Critical reception ===
The self-published book has been praised for the content. Times Higher Education praised the book as necessary and well-documented, which could have been improved with editing. The Irish Times praised the content and advocated for its wide dissemination in light of its seriousness but noted Chatterjee's personal agenda to have undermined its credibility. It criticized the book for suffering from glaring errors of syntax, missing words, repetitions et al. and for his often contradictory assertions. A review by Tim Challies praised the extensive documentation in the book, consisting of multitude of examples, though noting the shoddy organizing, as a result of being self-published. The far-left Socialist Review favourably received it as "a valuable contribution to unmasking the real Teresa".

The Telegraph praised the 2016 reprint as a brutally honest and relentlessly scathing read which gives readers an impartial point of view. A review in The Quint described it as a disconcerting book that had exhaustive details and consisted of laborious arguments though parts of it did appear to be inarticulate rants and failed to be objective.

== Devil's advocate ==
On the path to Mother Teresa's sainthood, a process Chatterjee has described as "a superstitious, black magic ceremony", Chatterjee acted as one of two official Devil's advocates during the process of her beatification in 2003, the other being Christopher Hitchens. In order to begin the requirements of beatification, the first step on the way to sainthood, the Catholic Church was required to announce a first miracle ascribed to Mother Teresa, which it did on 1 December 2002, the alleged miraculous cure of Monica Besra of a cyst caused by tuberculosis. Chatterjee pointed out the cure was a result of medical treatment Besra received from superintendent of the Balurghat Hospital and not the placing of metal jewellery on her body. His position was also confirmed by her doctor Ranjan Mustafi, speaking of the nine months of drugs and treatment he provided: "I've said several times that she was cured by the treatment." Initially both Besra and her husband called the miracle "a hoax", as did Prabir Ghosh from the Kolkata Humanist Association, who runs a programme raising awareness of holy men who dupe ordinary Indians into paying for supposed miracle cures. During the process, the Catholic Church allows consultation with doubters where the miracle is contested. In his book, Chatterjee details his deposition to the committee, his correspondence with the official postulator Brian Kolodiejchuk, and the transcripts of his questions and answers.

== See also ==
- Criticism of Mother Teresa
