= John Maddox (disambiguation) =

John Maddox (1925–2009) was a British scientist.

John Maddox may also refer to:

- John Maddox (cricketer) (born 1930), Australian former cricketer
- John Maddox (politician), American politician
- Johnny Maddox (1927–2018), American ragtime pianist
- John Medex Maddox (1789–1861), British playwright and theatre manager
- John W. Maddox (1848–1922), U.S. Representative from Georgia
