= Willie Mulvagh =

Willie Mulvagh (1881 - 195?) was the lover of Nora Barnacle.

Mulvagh was born in Mary Street, Galway, and worked in the town's mineral water company as an accountant. One day he accosted Nora on O'Brien's Bridge and asked her to go out with him. Initially unattracted, Nora accepted his offer as young women needed to be accompanied to the local dances, and Nora and her friends loved dancing. However, in turn of the century Galway it was not acceptable for Catholic girls to be courted by Protestant boys. Subterfuge was necessitated, aided by Nora's friend, Mary.

Mulvagh has become well known by readers of Molly Bloom's monologue in Ulysses with the line "Mulveys was the first." What exactly he was the first to do remains unknown. Brenda Maddox speculates that "it seems as if Willie Mulvagh may have been the first to instruct Nora in the art of pleasing a man without losing her virtue ... posterity is entitled to suspect that the young man from the mineral water factory and Nora Barnacle ventured further in their embraces than Nora revealed to her girlfriend waiting the Abbey Church's pews."

The immediate result of this was a severe punishing of Nora by her uncle Tommy Healy; he beat her with his thorn stick until she fell. Nora later gave this as the main reason for her decision to run away to Dublin.

Mulvagh himself converted to marry his Catholic wife three years later, as did his brothers. However, he never forgot Nora:

"Twice a widower, Willie lived on until the 1950s and in his last years made his home in England with his daughter. He was a silent man who never spoke about his past, never read books and had not the faintest idea that he was in Ulysses. His daughter was all the more startled one day, therefore, when Willie looked up from his newspaper, his memory apparently jogged by something he had read, and asked "James Joyce? Didn't he marry a Galway girl by the name of Barnacle?"
