= Maddow =

Maddow is a surname. Notable people with the surname include:

- Ben Maddow (1909–1992), American screenwriter and documentarian
- Rachel Maddow (born 1973), American television host, political commentator, and author

== See also ==
- Maddox (surname)
