= Musea =

Musea may refer to:

- Musea, a rare plural form of museum
- Musea, an American zine created by Tom Hendricks
- Musea Records, a French progressive rock record label
