= Bruno Maddox =

British novelist and journalist

Bruno P. Maddox
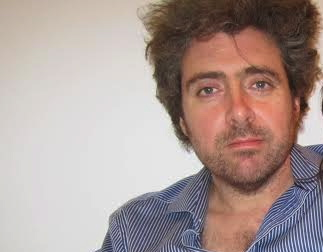
- Bruno Maddox in 2013
- Born: 1969; London, UK
- Occupations: Novelist; Journalist; Editor-in-chief
- Relatives: John Maddox, father Brenda Maddox, mother Bronwen Maddox, sister

Bruno P. Maddox (born 1969) is a British literary novelist and journalist who is best known for his novel My Little Blue Dress (2001) and for his satirical magazine essays.

After graduating from Harvard University in 1992, Maddox began his career reviewing books for The New York Times Book Review and The Washington Post Book World. In early 1996, he was appointed to an editorship at Spy magazine and within a few months, he was promoted to editor-in-chief, a position he held until the magazine shut down in 1998. Maddox wrote My Little Blue Dress between 1999 and 2001. Since its publication, he has focused on writing satirical essays for magazines such as GEAR and Travel + Leisure; he also contributes a monthly humor column to Discover magazine called "Blinded by Science", drawing on his early exposure to science and technology. Maddox is likewise a contributing editor to the American edition of The Week magazine.

== Early years ==
Maddox was born in London in 1969 to former Nature editor, the late Sir John Maddox, a writer on science and nature, and Brenda Maddox, a biographer of Rosalind Franklin, W. B. Yeats, Nora Barnacle and several others. He has one sister, Bronwen Maddox, who became a journalist, was Chief Foreign Commentator of The Times and Editor of Prospect magazine and is now Director of the Institute for Government. Maddox enjoyed a privileged life during his childhood and youth, because of his father's position as editor of Nature, encountering some of the leading scientific thinkers of the day and enjoying dinners with figures such as James Watson and Sir Fred Hoyle.

Despite his family's background in science, Maddox was interested in the humanities while he attended Westminster School, an independent boys' school in London. He went on to study English literature at Harvard University and graduated in 1992. He published his only article in the student newspaper The Harvard Crimson during his senior year. He won the undergraduate Thomas Temple Hoopes Prize for his senior thesis "on the use of adjectives in restaurant menus" titled Maltese: A Gastrosophic Theory of Reading. After graduation Maddox moved from Cambridge, Massachusetts, to Moscow—where he worked for three weeks as the English-language editor of a Russian magazine—and then to New York City, where he spent two years working odd jobs, including hand-delivering celebrity invitations to local parties.

Maddox's freelance writing career began in 1994, when he became a book reviewer for The New York Times Book Review and The Washington Post, where he developed a reputation for writing scathing reviews that would later help him land a job as an editor at Spy magazine. Maddox described his book reviewing style as "pretty vicious", and quipped that he "was a frustrated, twenty-something guy, sitting in his bedroom venting existential rage on these nasty academics". His last book review for The Washington Post was in late 1996; however, he continued reviewing for The New York Times up until 1998, contributing only a couple of reviews thereafter.

At the beginning of the dot-com boom, Maddox found full-time work at an information technology company, where he worked for a year and a half.

== Editorship of Spy magazine ==
In mid-1996, Maddox was hired as a senior editor at Spy magazine, a satirical monthly, in New York City. Spy had ceased publication in 1994 but was quickly resuscitated under new ownership by Sussex Publishers Inc., which reduced the magazine's frequency from ten to six issues a year. At Spy, Maddox was assisted by deputy editor Adam Lehner, a satirist. In December 1996, Maddox was promoted to editor-in-chief; his editorial team included Jared Paul Stern and, beginning in late 1997, future screenwriter William Monahan.

Maddox wanted to turn Spy into a national magazine rather than build on its legacy of covering stories that centred on New York. According to Maddox, two factors motivated the shift of target market. The magazine's past objects of satire, the "cheesy villains who anointed themselves as targets" in the 1980s, were no longer on the national stage. Meanwhile, the "sins of the '90s [were] those of a private, quiet cultivation of a sense of purity", and were harder to expose or ridicule.

In early 1998, Sussex Publishers increased Spy's frequency from six to nine issues a year in an effort to boost readership and ad pages. Spy's paid circulation continued to drop during Maddox's tenure, and in March 1998, the magazine once again ceased publication. Sussex's President and CEO John Colman concluded that "[despite the] great work by Bruno and his team, there just wasn't the [advertiser and consumer] acceptance that we need to make it financially viable". Maddox conceded that "a satirical magazine in New York in the late Nineties really had no function", because "everyone was being very modest and coy".

== My Little Blue Dress ==
My Little Blue Dress
- Author: Bruno Maddox
- Language: English
- Genre: Literary fiction
- Published: 2001 (Viking Press)
- Publication place: United States
- Pages: 256
- ISBN: 978-0-670-88483-4
- OCLC: 44592794
- Dewey Decimal: 813/.6 21
- LC Class: PS3563.A339444 M34 2001

In 1999, Maddox sold the advance rights to his first novel, My Little Blue Dress, to a German publisher based on a five-page fax proposal he sent on the advice of his literary agent John Brockman. Within a week Brockman managed to sell the rights to the novel to publishers in an additional eight countries on the strength of the proposal alone. (Maddox had not yet written even an initial manuscript.)

It was a pretty terrifying experience, suddenly having a legal obligation to write an extremely difficult post-modern novel having never written anything before and also, stupidly, I told him I could do it in six months, which was just a conversational thing until it turned up in black and white in my contract. The six months came and went and my reputation in publishing at the moment is a reflection of the two and a half years I spent writing it longer than I should have done. The Dutch cancelled when the Millennium came and went, they decided it was a millennial book, but weirdly they would have accepted it in November of 1999, for a few days of millennial reading, they failed to see that it is obviously a twenty-first century book.

— Bruno Maddox, on the publishing of his first novel

My Little Blue Dress was published in 2001 by Viking Press, a Penguin Group imprint. The novel begins as a memoir of a hundred-year-old woman, but several chapters later reveals itself to be a spoof of the genre. The protagonist is a fictional Bruno Maddox who is desperately attempting to create a forgery of an old woman's memoir in a single night. Several book reviewers avoided spoiling the novel's satire but others gave away its premise, reasoning that the publisher "reveal[s] all on the book jacket anyway". The novel's intrigue lies in the mysterious reason compelling the fictional Maddox to forge a memoir.

Critics applauded My Little Blue Dress but also expressed some reservations. For example, Salon.com's Maria Russo cautioned that the novel "is one of those 'don't try this at home' literary experiments that could easily have turned into an unreadable, pretentious disaster", but concluded that Maddox "pulls it off with a kind of fearless pizzazz". The New York Times' Emily Barton conceded that "for all its blunders", Maddox delivers "a winsome and vastly entertaining novel".

In an interview, Maddox praised Bret Easton Ellis's 1991 novel American Psycho, stating that he drew inspiration from protagonist Patrick Bateman's long-winded monologues about Phil Collins, restaurants, clothes, and how to remove blood from his carpets.

In 2001, Maddox promoted his first novel on a joint book tour billed as the "Minor Novelists Tour" with his friend William Monahan, another former Spy editor, but it was interrupted by the 9/11 attacks. Monahan's Light House: A Trifle was also published by a Penguin imprint. Several years later, Maddox gave some indication that he was working on a film adaptation of My Little Blue Dress, but it is unknown whether he completed the script.

== Recent essays ==
After the publication of My Little Blue Dress in 2001, Maddox was reportedly working on a second novel set in California, where "everyone's aspirational and deluded" and the "people are quite happy being waiters and dreaming of stardom". As of 2009, however, no manuscript was forthcoming.

I don't like to think in terms of careers, I want to move from project to project … I think like anything, it's good to keep changing. I just want to live with integrity.

— Bruno Maddox, on his lack of a career path

Since 2001, Maddox has written numerous articles for popular magazines, such as the now-defunct GEAR. Published one year after the 11 September 2001 attacks, his essay "Before It Was Real" describes the callousness of the terrorists who flew into the World Trade Center through the experience of playing a flight simulator game. Another example of Maddox's work is his 2003 profile of Karl Wenclas, leader of the Underground Literary Alliance, titled "The Angriest Book Club in America" and published in the fashion magazine BlackBook. Wenclas later derided Maddox for distorting the Underground Literary Alliance in his BlackBook essay and summed up the article as "riddled with falsehoods".

In late 2003, Maddox began to contribute articles regularly to Travel + Leisure. His first article in the magazine was called "The Concorde, R.I.P.", which chronicled his flight aboard the supersonic Concorde aeroplane before it was decommissioned; it was later included in The Best Travel Writing 2005, the second volume of the annual Travelers' Tales series. In 2004 Maddox began working as a contributing editor for the American edition of The Week magazine and as of 2007 continues to contribute weekly to the print issue, handling sections including "Main Stories", "Talking Points", and "Only in America". He also reviewed several books for The New York Post in 2004 and 2005.

In 2006, Maddox began contributing a regular humour column called "Blinded by Science" to Discover magazine. His writing draws upon his childhood exposure to science; due to his father's career, his family was immersed in science, and he was regularly exposed to scientists at social events. Maddox's first year's columns earned him a nod as a finalist in the 2007 National Magazine Awards' "Columns and Commentary" category.

Maddox's Discover columns are occasionally criticised; his essay "Fictional Reality", in particular, has been controversial. Maddox declared science fiction obsolete in his essay "Fictional Reality" and was roundly criticised in the blogosphere, most notably by Scientific American's J.R. Minkel. Maddox wrote that "fiction—all fiction—finally became obsolete as a delivery system for big ideas" as a result of the "scarcity of foreseeable future", citing the decline of author Michael Crichton's work as evidence. Minkel lambasted Maddox and pointed to author Neal Stephenson's cutting-edge work as proof to the contrary, venturing that "science fiction writers can dictate the future if they have the vim and vision".

One of Maddox's most recent Discover essays, "The James Watson Affair", examines comments made by James Watson in an article in London's Sunday Times which led to Watson's suspension at the laboratory where he worked and his eventual retirement, and is skeptical of critics who found Watson's comment about black employees "not that big a deal" yet charged him with racism for his proposition on black African intelligence. In conclusion, Maddox derides the views held by several critics, stating that in comparison to Watson's statements, "the most ignorant and hurtful idea of all, of course, is that the entire topic of race and genes and intelligence is off-limits to all right-thinking, compassionate people, just on principle", which pejoratively assumes "that some races are innately and immutably much less intelligent than others". Maddox's essay, although published in the March 2008 printed edition of Discover, has not been published online.

== Style ==
Satire is evident in much of Maddox's work, from his years as editor-in-chief for Spy magazine to his numerous articles in Travel + Leisure, and his novel My Little Blue Dress. Maddox's satirical tendencies extend to his interviews and publicity materials. In one interview he made the preposterous claim that he once "spent 2 days being a personal assistant to a mafia boss in New York". Maddox's Penguin biography skewers his own career, claiming he "elevated [Spy] to within spitting distance of its former glory, then accidentally bankrupted it after two short years", which led The Harvard Crimson, his alma mater's student newspaper, to speculate that "Maddox himself had a hand in writing" it. Maddox's popular science columns for Discover magazine impart his own personal views on science with a markedly humorous and skeptical bent.

== Selected bibliography ==
Novel

- Bruno Maddox (2001). My Little Blue Dress: A Novel. New York: Viking. ISBN 978-0-670-88483-4.
