= Literary activism =

Literary activism is a form of protest and critique aimed at corporate publishing houses and the literary fiction/nonfiction that they publish. The progenitors of literary activism are the members of the Underground Literary Alliance. This group of writers is notorious for its protests, which have included making formal complaints against Guggenheim grants given to already-wealthy authors, crashing New York literary readings, and maintaining a website which reports weekly on the perceived corruption and lack of integrity of the current literary world.

Acts of literary activism can also include editing and bringing out writers' work in online and print journals and through book publishers, reading and reviewing that work, writing essays about it, teaching it, talking it up, urging others to launch journals and indies presses, running reading series, laboring in arts administration, coordination innovative writing conferences, launching local writing groups, posting about authors and texts they love on their blogs or via other social networking sites.
