= CD Baby =

Digital music distributor

CD Baby, Inc.
- Available in: English, Spanish, Portuguese
- Founded: March 10, 1998; 28 years ago Woodstock, New York, U.S.
- Headquarters: Portland, Oregon, U.S.
- Area served: Worldwide
- Founder: Derek Sivers
- Industry: Digital distribution, music publisher
- Products: Digital distribution
- Parent: AVL Digital Group (Downtown, now Virgin Music Group)
- Subsidiaries: Audio and Video Labs, Inc. (Soundrop)
- Website: cdbaby.com

CD Baby, Inc. is a Portland, Oregon based online distributor of independent music. The company was described as an "anti-label" by its parent company's Chief Operating Officer Tracy Maddux. It was established in 1998 and offered distribution for artists in physical and online format, however it discontinued the physical media service and went digital only in June 2023.

In 2018, CD Baby was one of the three companies with preferred partner status with Apple Music. It was home to more than 650,000 artists and nine million tracks that were made available to over 100 digital services and platforms around the globe as of May 2019.

== History ==
CD Baby was founded in 1998 by Derek Sivers during the dot-com craze.

In 2000, it moved to Portland, Oregon, where they remain headquartered today. In 2004, CD Baby began offering a digital music distribution and became an early partner of iTunes.

In August 2008, Disc Makers, a CD and DVD manufacturer, announced that they had bought CD Baby (and Host Baby) for 22 million dollars following a seven-year partnership between the two companies.

In 2013, CD Baby Pro Publishing was launched as an add-on that assists independent songwriters in administering their composition rights and collecting global publishing royalties. The service is now available to songwriters in more than 70 countries and territories.

In March 2019, Disc Makers sold CD Baby (as part of the AVL Digital Group) to Downtown for $200 million. AVL's physical product divisions, Disc Makers, BookBaby, and Merchly, were acquired in a separate transaction by the Disc Makers executive team as part of the newly formed DIY Media Group.

On March 31, 2020, CD Baby ceased its retail sales.

CD Baby offered fulfillment services for artists who sold physical media through outlets such as Amazon Marketplace and Alliance, but it discontinued this service in June 2023 and will continue as online distribution only.

== Services ==
Between its opening in 1998 to 2018, the company reports it had paid out $600 million over the two decades to artists. In addition to the services the firm offers under its own name, CD Baby also now owns and operates HearNow, Show.co, Illustrated Sound Network, and HostBaby. HostBaby closed in 2019.

== See also ==
- List of companies based in Oregon
- ONErpm
