= If Only the Dead Could Listen =

- Cover of the first American edition, by Roland Lelaj
- Author: Gëzim Alpion
- Language: English
- Publisher: Globic Press
- Publication date: 2008
- Publication place: United States
- Media type: Print (Paperback)

If Only the Dead Could Listen (Globic Press, 2008), by Gëzim Alpion, is a play about the treatment of asylum seekers and refugees in Britain. The play is a revised version of Alpion’s six-scene tragedy Vouchers (2001).

== Plot ==
The events of the play take place at a police station in a small town near London, UK, in December 2001.

Scene One: Bill Wright, a police sergeant in his late forties, is anxiously awaiting the arrival of Alma Stone, an Albanian researcher in London. She has volunteered to act as an interpreter at the interview of Leka Trimi, an Albanian asylum seeker from Kosova, who has been arrested on suspicion of theft. The conversation between Bill and Alma reveals that she suffers from an inferiority complex because of the bad press her country and expatriates receive in the British media. Bill is taken by surprise by her low opinion of her fellow Albanians.

Scene Two: John, a custody officer, orders Leka repeatedly to sit down when Bill and Alma enter the interview room. Leka is profusely apologetic to Bill for having hit him unintentionally the day before during a fight that had broken out between Leka and a fellow Albanian interpreter. Leka speaks broken English throughout the scene. He is very courteous towards Alma. When John leaves the interview room Bill and Alma fail to convince Leka that Alma is Albanian. Leka’s self-esteem and his opinion of his fellow Albanians are apparently so low that he cannot comprehend that some of his compatriots in the UK are not refugees. At some point Leka compares Alma to another woman with a Serbian name, something which makes Alma very curious. She tries without success to learn from Leka about the Serbian woman. Alma could sense that Leka has perhaps a Serbian wife/girlfriend, which, in her view, is very strange considering the hostility between the Albanians and the Serbs in Kosova. John interrupts the interview to inform Bill that the Chief of Police needs to see him immediately.

Scene Three: With Bill gone, Leka remains in the interview room, while John and Alma have a chat in the corridor. John is not aware that Alma is Albanian. Alma is eager to enter the interview room and ask Leka about the Serbian woman. She manages to get rid of John temporarily by flirting with him. When she is alone in the interview room with Leka, Alma asks him about the Serbian woman, but he avoids answering her questions. Always believing that she is British, Leka praises her and the British for their generosity towards asylum seekers and refugees. His speech, however, is often peppered with ironic remarks, which indicates that he is saying to her what he believes she wants to hear. Alma tells Leka she is Albanian but he does not believe her because, in his view, this is not the time for Albanians to pursue academic careers in the West. Alma grows increasingly fond of him. Their conversation is interrupted by Bill who is shocked to find her alone with Leka. John is rude to Alma when he learns that she is Albanian. Leka is traumatised when he realises for the first time that he has behaved with such humility in the presence of a fellow Albanian. Bill, Alma and John withdraw from the interview room, leaving Leka behind. John keeps guard in front of the door of the interview room while Bill takes Alma to his office telling her he will collect her personally once he has dealt with the emergency which caused him to interrupt the interview in Scene Two.

Scene Four: Alma manages to enter the interview room without being detected by John. She is eager to resume her conversation with Leka but is shocked by his unexpected rudeness. Leka tells Alma that, in his view, she is a refugee and a cheat like every other Albanian in the UK. Alma resents being called a refugee saying that she is a researcher and that she has worked very hard to build her career. Leka is obviously hurt by the way he has been treated in England. His bullish and violent behaviour scares Alma but she is not intimidated by him. Leka is shocked to hear that she has ‘abandoned’ her son and ‘ruined’ he marriage for the sake of her career. Leka tells her that his son and wife are in Kosova. Alma wants to learn more about them but Leka is reluctant to talk. When Alma insists to know more and urges Leka to be patient because he will soon be reunited with his wife and son he tells her that they are both dead. The scene ends with them embracing.

Scene Five: Alma, slumped over the desk, appears to be resting on the chair near the door, her arm on the desk, supporting her head. In a long monologue Leka opens his heart to Alma about his own family tragedy, i.e. gang-raping and killing of his pregnant Serbian girlfriend by Serbian policemen in Kosova; witnessing the killing of his parents by Serbian soldiers; and his painful experiences as an asylum seeker in the UK. Leka also tells Alma why he shoplifted in London: A few weeks before the arrest he had gone to a pub for a drink. As he did not have enough money, he offered to pay for drinks with a voucher. A racist bartender does not accept the voucher humiliating Leka in front of some drunken louts. As Leka’s confession to Alma is over, Bill and John enter the interview room. Leka attacks them thinking they are the Serbian policemen, who had raped his girlfriend. Leka is finally overpowered and taken away while a doctor examines Alma. The scene ends with Bill looking at the tape and the audience.

== Stage productions and critical reception ==
Directed by Serbian-born dramaturg Duška Radosavljević, Vouchers received a rehearsed reading at the Festival of Contemporary European Plays in Huddersfield, UK, in March 2002, with English academic Dr. Steve Nicholson cast as the character of Dr Agim Kodra, and Jordanian actor Mohammed Aljarrah playing the role of Leka Trimi.

Sponsored by Arts Council England and the Birmingham and Midland Institute, and staged by Dreamscape Theatre Company, If Only the Dead Could Listen had its world première in February 2006 at the MAC Theatre, Birmingham, UK. The March 2008 performances at the MAC Theatre and the Arena Theatre in Wolverhampton were sponsored by r:evolve, a Consortium of the Arena Theatre, the Midlands Arts Centre (MAC), and Black Country Touring. All the performances in 2006 and 2008 were directed by Marcus Fernando.

Following the success of the British première, Alpion and Dreamscape received invitations from the National Theatres of Albania, Kosova and Macedonia, all offering their resources for the show to be staged in their countries. Serbia and Croatia also expressed a keen interest.

Prabhleen Kaur Pabla writes that a scene from the play (included in the author's collection, Encounters with Civilizations: From Alexander the Great to Mother Teresa) "captures the inferiority complex faced by the Albanian immigrants as well as the ill-treatment faced by them". A Birmingham Mail article describes If Only the Dead Could Listen as a "gritty play ... challenging perceptions about Albanian asylum seekers".

== Cast and Crew ==
- Andrew Cullum (2006), and Laurence Saunders (2008) as Bill Wright
- Peter Collis as police officer John Moseley
- Tina Hofman as Alma Stone
- Richard Attlee (2006) of The Archers, and Andrew Cullum (2008) as Leka Trimi
- Tina Hofman as Woman
- Peter Collis as Bartender
- Andrew Cullum (2006), and Laurence Saunders (2008) as Man
- David Wake as Paramedic
- Director & Designer – Marcus Fernando
- Production Advisor – Duška Radosavljević (2006)
- Stage Manager & Website Designer – David Wake
- Movement – Tina Hofman
- Music – Mark Taylor

== Editions ==
Vouchers: A Tragedy, was first published by the University of Birmingham Central Printing Services, UK, in 2001. This English edition includes an introduction by Dr Michael W. Thomas, and praise for the play from Professor David Edgar, Professor J. T. Boulton, FBA, Dr Adrian Stokes, and Dr Tom Gorman.

If Only the Dead Could Listen was first published by Globic Press, Chapel Hill, NC, USA, in 2008. The American edition includes an introduction by Professor Adrian Blackledge, Birmingham Poet Laureate 2014-15.
