= Maureen Charlton =

Irish playwright, poet and broadcaster

- Born: Mary Farrell/O'Farrell; 14 September 1930; Dublin, Ireland
- Died: 10 August 2007 (aged 76); Blackrock Clinic, County Dublin
- Occupations: playwright, poet and broadcaster

Maureen Charlton (14 September 1930 – 10 August 2007) was an Irish playwright, poet and broadcaster.

== Early life ==
Maureen Charlton was born Mary Farrell on 14 September 1930 in Dublin. She was one of three daughters of Edward and Bridget Farrell (or O'Farrell). She grew up in Mount Merrion, attending Loreto College, St Stephen's Green. Along with her younger sister Nuala, she studied arts in University College Dublin (UCD) where they were both active members of the Dramatic Society. Under the name Mairín O'Farrell, she starred as Pegeen Mike in The Playboy of the Western World as part of an inter-varsity drama festival in Cambridge and Oxford in 1950.

== Career ==
Collaborating with her sister Nuala, Charlton wrote an adaptation of Synge's Playboy as a ballad opera called The heart's a wonder. It was performed in UCD's Aula Maxima in November 1957, after they had graduated. In August 1958, it was performed professionally at the Gaiety Theatre, Dublin. The orchestral arrangements was by Gerard Victory, costumes and sets were by Micheál Mac Liammóir, with Milo O'Shea and Joe Lynch starring in the production. It proved a popular production despite some purists' objections. CIÉ put on a special train from Waterford, and there were plans for a long-playing record. The play was taken to the Westminster Theatre, London after a four-week run, and later was performed in New York in early 1959. Mary O'Malley put on the play a number of times at various venues in 1959, 1962 and 1971. BBC televised scenes from the show in September 1958, and in 1971 it was aired on RTÉ as part of the Synge centenary. It was revived several times, including in the Abbey Theatre in 1978, and was popular with amateur dramatic societies.

On 18 April 1963, she married Hugh Charlton (1930–2012) in the church of San Clemente, Rome. He was an art dealer and property developer, and owner of Apollo Gallery on Dawson Street, Dublin. Through his work they knew many of prominent artists of the time. They had two sons, Julian and Edward. Her sister Nuala married the journalist John Mulcahy. With Nuala as the musical director, Charlton wrote a musical compilation about 18th century Dublin theatre, Smock Alley. It was produced in 1967 and 1969 and received good reviews. She went on to write a number of plays including Go where glory waits thee about the life of Thomas Moore, which was later adapted into a film and aired on RTÉ, Servants and masters which was performed first in 1971 at the Tailors' Hall, Dublin, Denis O'Shaughnessy goes to Maynooth based on a story by William Carleton, and The people against Mary Sheridan for television. Her 1987 one-person show about Peg Woffington was not well received.

Charlton continued to write short stories and poetry, but none were as successful as her earlier work. Her volume of poetry, Lyrics from 'Nora Barnacle' was published in 1990. The poems about the life of Nora Barnacle, were originally part of a libretto by Charlton which was performed in the Dublin Theatre Festival of 1980 in the Eblana Theatre. The Washington Post described it as, "the finest piece of theatre at this or at other theatre festival since The Cherry Orchard with Siobhan McKenna in 1968".

She worked with her sister and brother-in-law as an assistant editor of The Hibernia Magazine from 1964 to 1966. She founded and edited six issues of Martello from 1982 to 1990. In 1990 she published a collection of poetry, Selected fables of La Fontaine and in 1997 a volume of prose and poetry with Warren O'Connell, Duet for two Dubs. She was a regular contributor to the Sunday Miscellany on RTÉ Radio, briefly worked as the Evening Press theatre critic, and sat on the board of various cultural institutions. She was a member of the Irish Byron Society, hosting its annual midsummer garden party at her home in Blackrock, Newtown House. Charlton founded the Bell Tower Trust with some colleagues. The Trust aimed to save St Catherine's Church on Thomas Street. They raised funds to renovate the church which was later an arts centre. She was an active member of Royal Dublin Society, the Cercle Stendhal de Grenoble, the Friends of Lord Edward Fitzgerald Society, and the Irish Georgian Society.

Charlton died on 10 August 2007 in Blackrock Clinic, County Dublin.
