= The Missionary Position: Mother Teresa in Theory and Practice =

1995 book by Christopher Hitchens

- Author: Christopher Hitchens
- Language: English
- Subject: Mother Teresa
- Publisher: Verso
- Publication date: 1995
- Publication place: United Kingdom
- Pages: 128 pages
- ISBN: 1-85984-054-X
- OCLC: 33358318
- Dewey Decimal: 271/.97 B 20
- LC Class: BX4406.5.Z8 H55 1995

The Missionary Position: Mother Teresa in Theory and Practice is a book by the journalist and polemicist Christopher Hitchens published in 1995. It is a critique of the work and philosophy of Mother Teresa, the founder of an international Catholic religious congregation, and it challenges the mainstream media's assessment of her charitable efforts. The book's thesis, as summarized by one critic, is that "Mother Teresa is less interested in helping the poor than in using them as an indefatigable source of wretchedness on which to fuel the expansion of her fundamentalist Roman Catholic beliefs."

Only 128 pages in length, it was re-issued in paperback and ebook form with a foreword by Thomas Mallon in 2012.

== Background ==
Hitchens addressed the subject of Mother Teresa on several occasions before publishing The Missionary Position. In 1992 he devoted one of his regular columns in The Nation to her. In 1993 he discussed her during an interview on C-SPAN's Booknotes, noting public reaction: "If you touch the idea of sainthood, especially in this country, people feel you've taken something from them personally. I'm fascinated because we like to look down on other religious beliefs as being tribal and superstitious but never dare criticize our own." In 1994 he contributed to a 25-minute essay broadcast on British television. A New York Times critic thought the show should provoke other journalists to visit Calcutta and conduct their own investigations. He recounted his work on the television production in Vanity Fair in early 1995. In the foreword to The Missionary Position, he described these activities as "early polemics", part of "a battle", and estimated that The Missionary Position represented an expansion of the television script "by about a third".

The back cover of the first edition carried several of the customary blurbs praising the book as well as one that quoted the New York Press: "If there is a hell, Hitchens is going there for this book."

=== Later events ===
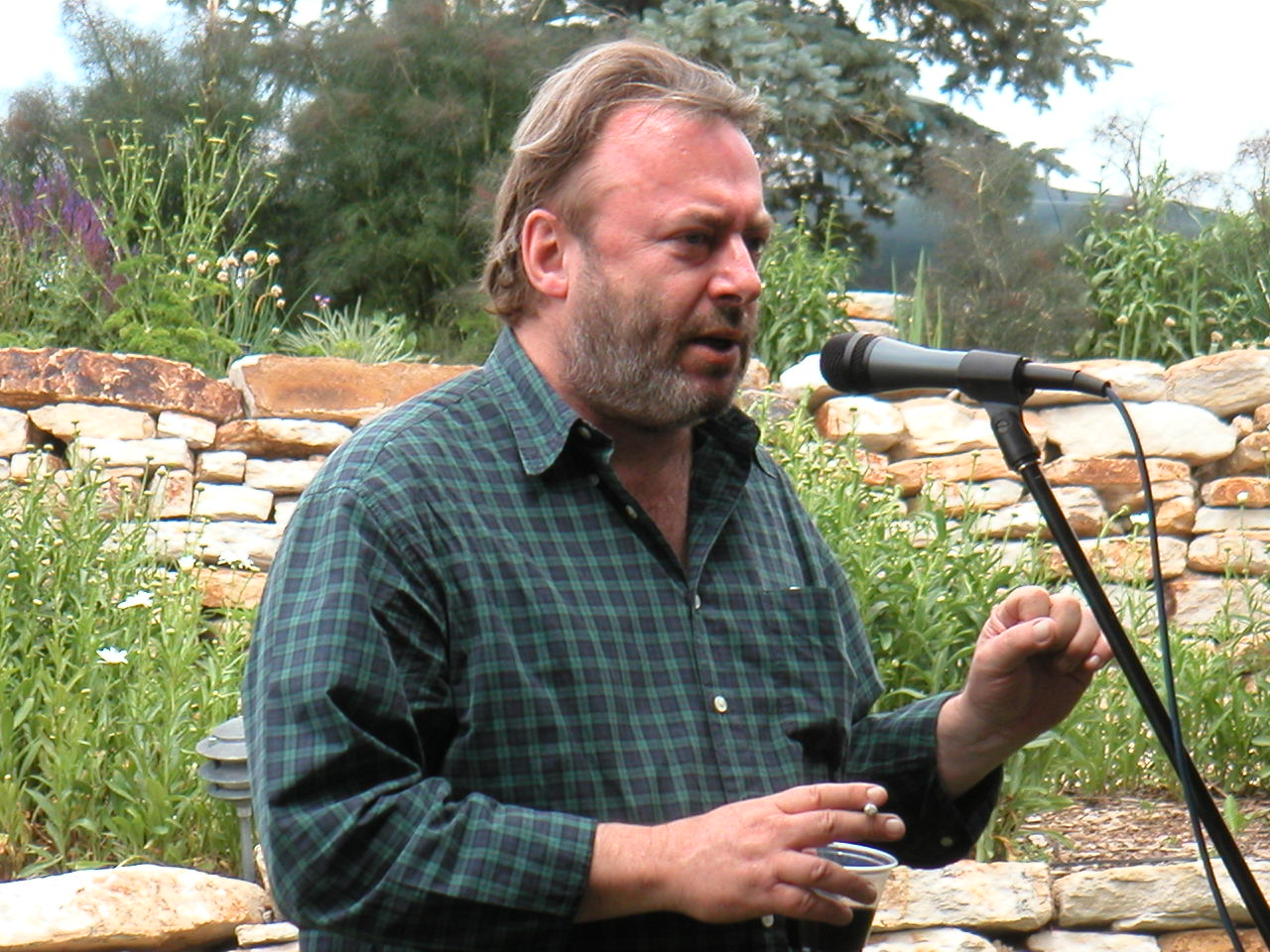
Christopher Hitchens in 2005

In 2001, Hitchens testified in opposition before the body of the Washington Archdiocese that was considering the cause of Mother Teresa's sainthood. He described his role as that of the traditional devil's advocate, charged with scrutinising the candidate's sanctity. Mother Teresa was beatified in October 2003. Hitchens marked the occasion by questioning the speed of the modern beatification process and describing "the obviousness of the fakery" of the miracle attributed to her. He argued that she "was not a friend of the poor. She was a friend of poverty" and "a friend to the worst of the rich". He wrote that the press was to blame for its "soft-hearted, soft-headed, and uninquiring propaganda" on her behalf. She was canonized as Saint Teresa of Kolkata in September 2016.

== Synopsis ==
The introduction is devoted to Mother Teresa's acceptance of an award from the government of Haiti, which Hitchens uses to discuss her relationship to the Duvalier regime. From her praise of the country's corrupt first family, he writes, "Other questions arise … all of them touching on matters of saintliness, modesty, humility and devotion to the poor." He adds other examples of Mother Teresa's relationships with powerful people with what he considers dubious reputations. He quickly reviews Mother Teresa's saintly reputation in books devoted to her and describes the process of beatification and canonization under Pope John Paul II. Finally, he disclaims any quarrel with Mother Teresa herself and says he is more concerned with the public view of her: "What follows here is an argument not with a deceiver but with the deceived."

The first section, "A Miracle", discusses the popular view of Mother Teresa and focuses on the 1969 BBC documentary Something Wonderful for God which brought her to the attention of the general public and served as the basis for the book of the same title by Malcolm Muggeridge. Hitchens says that Calcutta's reputation as a place of abject poverty, "a hellhole", is not deserved, but nevertheless provides a sympathetic context for Mother Teresa's work there. He quotes from conversations between Muggeridge and Mother Teresa, providing his own commentary. He quotes Muggeridge's description of "the technically unaccountable light" the BBC team filmed in the interior of the Home of the Dying as "the first authentic photographic miracle". Hitchens contrasts this with the cameraman's statement that what Muggeridge thought was a miracle was the result of them using the latest Kodak low light film.

The second section, "Good Works and Heroic Deeds", has three chapters:

- Asserting that Mother Teresa serves her own religious beliefs and reputation, Hitchens questions the popular belief that Mother Teresa is nevertheless addressing the physical needs of the poor. He quotes several who have visited her institutions or worked in them to establish that the medical care provided does not compare with that provided in a hospice, lacked diagnostic services, and eschewed even basic pain medications. He says that rather than asceticism, her institutions are characterized by "austerity, rigidity, harshness and confusion" because "when the requirements of dogma clash with the needs of the poor, it is the latter which give way." He quotes a former member of her order who describes baptisms of the dying performed without their consent.
- Hitchens reviews the Catholic Church's moral teaching on abortion, sympathizing in general but objecting first to its "absolutist edict" that makes no distinction between a fertilized egg and later stages of development, and second to its proscription on birth control. Noting conservative Catholics who have dissented from this last teaching, he identifies Mother Teresa as "the most consistently reactionary figure." Hitchens quotes her speech when accepting the Nobel Peace Prize in 1979: "Today, abortion is the worst evil, and the greatest enemy of peace." Hitchens goes on to argue that women become empowered when given the right to contraceptives. He writes that giving women control over their fertility and empowering them is the only known cure to poverty.
- Hitchens describes the prize money awarded Mother Teresa, "the extraordinary largesse of governments, large foundations, corporations and private citizens", to call into question whether her avowed poverty is not the affectation of poverty. He describes her ties to financier Charles Keating, who gave her $1.25 million before being convicted for his role in the savings and loan scandal (1986–1995). He includes a facsimile of a letter she wrote testifying to Keating's good character, followed by a letter from the prosecutor's office to Mother Teresa detailing Keating's crimes, the thousands of people he "fleeced without flinching" of $252 million. The prosecutor asked her to do "what Jesus would do if he were in possession of money that had been stolen, … if he were being exploited by a thief to ease his conscience". Hitchens ends by noting that the letter has not had a response.

The third section, "Ubiquity", has two chapters:

- Hitchens describes Mother Teresa's Albanian background and political events in the Balkans to establish the importance of her 1990 visit to the nationalist Mother Albania monument in Tirana, an assertion of Catholic expansionist sentiment in the unstable former Yugoslavia.
- Hitchens notes the consistency with which Mother Teresa has backed powerful interests aligned against the powerless: Union Carbide following the 1984 Bhopal disaster, the government of Margaret Thatcher, the administration of Ronald Reagan. She visited Nicaragua to side with the CIA-backed Contras against the Sandinistas.

== Reception ==
In the London Review of Books, Amit Chaudhuri praised the book: "Hitchens's investigations have been a solitary and courageous endeavour. The book is extremely well-written, with a sanity and sympathy that tempers its irony." He commented that the portrait "is in danger of assuming the one-dimensionality of the Mother Teresa of her admirers", and that he finished the book without much more of an idea of the character and motivations of Mother Teresa. In The New York Times, Bruno Maddox wrote: "Like all good pamphlets... it is very short, zealously over-written and rails wild". He called its arguments "rather convincing", made "with consummate style." The Sunday Times said: "A dirty job but someone had to do it. By the end of this elegantly written, brilliantly argued piece of polemic, it is not looking good for Mother Teresa."

Bill Donohue, president of the Catholic League, in a critical review that appeared in 1996 wrote: "If this sounds like nonsense, well, it is." Though he admired Hitchens generally as a writer and "provocateur", Donohue has said that Hitchens was "totally overrated as a scholar ... sloppy in his research". Donohue released a book to coincide with Saint Teresa's canonization, entitled "Unmasking Mother Teresa's Critics". In an interview, Donohue said, "Unlike Hitchens, who wrote a 98-page book with no footnotes, no endnotes, no bibliography, no attribution at all, just 98 pages of unsupported opinion, I have a short book too. But I actually have more footnotes than I have pages in the book. That's because I want people to check my sources."

The New York Review of Books provided a series of contrasting assessments of both Mother Teresa's and Hitchens's views over several months, beginning with a review of The Missionary Position by journalist Murray Kempton who found Hitchens persuasive that Mother Teresa's "love for the poor is curiously detached from every expectation or even desire for the betterment of their mortal lot". His essay matched the tone of Hitchens's prose: "The swindler Charles Keating gave her $1.25 million—most dubiously his own to give—and she rewarded him with the 'personalized crucifix' he doubtless found of sovereign use as an ornamental camouflage for his pirate flag." He condemned her for baptizing those "incapable of informed consent" and for "her service at Madame Duvalier's altar". Kempton saw Hitchens's work as a contrast with his avowed atheism and more representative of a Christian whose protests "resonate with the severities of orthodoxy". In reply, Jesuit priest and culture editor of the magazine America James J. Martin acknowledged that Mother Teresa "accepted donations from dictators and other unsavory characters [and] tolerates substandard medical conditions in her hospices." Without mentioning Hitchens, he called Kempton's review "hysterical" and made two points, that she took advantage of high quality medical care for herself most likely at the urging of other members of her order and that the care her order provides is "comfort and solace" for the dying, not "primary health care" as other orders do. Martin closed his remarks by stating that there "would seem to be two choices" regarding those poor people in the developing world who die neglected: "First, to cluck one's tongue that such a group of people should even exist. Second, to act: to provide comfort and solace to these individuals as they face death. Mr. Kempton chooses the former. Mother Teresa, for all of her faults, chooses the latter."

Literary critic and sinologist Simon Leys wrote that "the attacks which are being directed at Mother Teresa all boil down to one single crime: she endeavors to be a Christian, in the most literal sense of the word". He compared her accepting "the hospitality of crooks, millionaires, and criminals" to Christ's relations with unsavory individuals, said that on his deathbed he would prefer the comfort Mother Teresa's order provides to the services of "a modern social worker". He defended secretly baptizing the dying as "a generous mark of sincere concern and affection". He concluded by comparing journalists' treatment of Mother Teresa to Christ being spat upon.

In reply to Leys, Hitchens noted that in April 1996 Mother Teresa welcomed Princess Diana's divorce after advising the Irish to oppose the right of civil divorce and remarriage in a November 1995 national referendum. He thought this buttressed his case that Mother Teresa preached different gospels to the rich and the poor. He disputed whether Christ ever praised someone like the Duvaliers or accepted funds "stolen from small and humble savers" by the likes of Charles Keating. He identified Leys with religious leaders who "claim that all criticism is abusive, blasphemous, and defamatory by definition". Leys replied in turn, writing that Hitchens' book "contain[ed] a remarkable number of howlers on elementary aspects of Christianity" and accusing Hitchens of "a complete ignorance of the position of the Catholic Church on the issues of marriage, divorce, and remarriage" and a "strong and vehement distaste for Mother Teresa."

In 1999, Charles Taylor of Salon called The Missionary Position "brilliant" and wrote that it "should have laid the myth of Mother Teresa's saintliness to rest once and for all."

== See also ==
- Aroup Chatterjee, another critic of Mother Teresa
