= Maddux (surname) =

Maddux is an English surname. It is a variant of Maddox. Notable people with the surname include:

- Don Maddux (born 1940), American politician from Ohio
- Earle H. Maddux (1906–1974), American Anglo-Catholic liturgist
- Elmer Maddux (1934–2019), American politician
- Greg Maddux (born 1966), American baseball player, brother of Mike
- Jared Maddux (1911–1971), American politician from Tennessee
- Jeff Maddux (born 1988), American football player
- Masha Dashkina Maddux, Ukrainian dancer
- Mike Maddux (born 1961), American baseball player and coach, brother of Greg
- Roger Maddux (born 1948), American mathematician
- Sam Maddux Jr. (1915–1990), United States Air Force officer
- Stu Maddux (born 1965), American writer and cinematographer
- Tracy Maddux, American music business executive

== See also ==
- Maddux (statistic), a baseball statistic named after Greg Maddux
- Maddox (surname)
- Maddox (disambiguation)
- Maddux Airlines
