= Madox =

Madox is a given name and surname. Notable people with the name include:

== Given name ==
- Elizabeth Madox Roberts (1881–1941), American novelist and poet
- Ford Madox Brown (1821–1893), English painter
- Ford Madox Ford (1873–1939), English novelist, poet, critic and editor

== Surname ==
- Richard Madox, English explorer
- Thomas Madox (1666–1727), English legal antiquary and historian

== See also ==
- Maddox (given name)
- Maddox (surname)
- Madoxx Ssemanda Sematimba (born 1972), Ugandan roots reggae musician
