= Encounters with Civilizations =

2011 book by Gëzim Alpion

Encounters with Civilizations: From Alexander the Great to Mother Teresa
- Cover of the second US edition, by Ellen F. Kane
- Author: Gëzim Alpion
- Language: English
- Publisher: Transaction Publishers
- Publication date: 2011
- Publication place: United States
- Media type: Print (paperback)

Encounters with Civilizations: From Alexander the Great to Mother Teresa is a book by sociologist Gëzim Alpion which explores people’s experience and tensions of dealing with civilizations and cultures different from their own. The fifteen texts cover Albania, Egypt, the United Kingdom and India, and explores how these countries have been shaped by different cultures. It raises issues about citizenship, multiculturalism and integration.

== Author information ==
Alpion is an Albanian academic and civil activist. He is currently based in the Department of Sociology at the University of Birmingham, United Kingdom. Alpion earned a B.A. from Cairo University in 1989 and a PhD from Durham University, United Kingdom in 1997.

Alpion's research area deals with the sociology of religion, nationalism, fame, race, media, film and authorship. He has written extensively about Mother Teresa and is considered an expert on her life.

The book was first published by Meteor Books in India in 2008. The first American edition was issued by Globic Press in 2009. The second US edition was published by Transaction Publishers in 2011.

The fifteen texts in the book are selected and introduced by Canadian-born scholar Gaston Roberge. Professor Roberge teaches film and communication at St. Xavier's College, Kolkata, India. He has written eighteen books, one of which Communication Cinema Development, won an award at the National Film Festival of India in 1999.

== Overview ==
Encounters with Civilizations encompasses broad themes such as history, culture, the media, social issues, and politics. Building around comparative analyses of aspects of Albanian, Egyptian, British, and Indian cultures, Alpion addresses the problems people experience in their encounters with civilizations different from their birth cultures in a collection of thirteen texts written between 1993 and 2007.

Alpion describes how Egyptian culture and politics have been shaped by foreign domination while retaining ancient customs at the social level. In comparison, Great Britain has been an imperial power whose cultural preeminence has shaped the images of smaller countries in the eyes of the world. Alpion writes of English images of his native Albania and offers an analysis of Mother Teresa as a Christian missionary in Hindu and Muslim India, focusing on her cultural presentation via the media and the cult of celebrity. Alpion deals with the impact of several cultural encounters, from Egyptian coffee houses to Alexander the Great as a defining figure in Western and Eastern culture. Alpion contends that "civilizations can co-exist, but not if some are written off as footnotes while others impose themselves as the norm".

== Reception ==
Professor Brian Shoesmith of Edith Cowan University writes that: "Like all good sociologists Alpion illuminates the core of a society through an analysis of its margins... Alpion offers us a view of the other that is not embittered or destructive but ultimately positive and challenging."

Reviewing the book in the Journal of Theological Reflection, Professor Gispert-Sauch says that "One of the main theses of the book is that there is, especially in academia, an inbuilt discrimination and injustice against countries outside the First World, and that Albania and other East European nations suffer the same or similar discrimination as West Asian Islamic countries, and the African and Asian continents... The book is therefore a collection of 13 significant sociological and historical articles relay[ing] a voice from the margins that comes from inside the geography at times wrongly considered to be uniformly the "rich world"".

Writing in the Albanian Journal of Politics, Claire Smetherham of the University of Bristol wrote that Alpio's book was "reminiscent of Durkheim’s writings on strangers in places" and that the book "covers centuries and cultures both past and present... [Alpion] encourages us to think reflectively and critically about our own beliefs, experiences and understandings, and thus helps to open up the possibility for change and the encounters with “civilizations” (others and our own) that we experience daily, either personally or through the media."

Professor John Holmwood of the University of Nottingham called the essays in the book "necessary reading" and that Alpion is the "ideal companion in travels" given his addressing of diverse issues in the context of growing interconnection of cultures through globalization.

Nicolas Pelham, former editor of The Middle East Times and current Jerusalem correspondent for The Economist writes that "[Alpion] seeks to do on paper what Mohammed Ali did in politics: release Egypt from the psychosis of its national inferiority complex, restore its nationhood, and revive Egypt for the Egyptians. And in Foreigner Complex he comes closer to depicting the essence of five thousand years of Egyptian identity than a thousand newspaper despatches from Cairo."

== Reviews ==
This is a select list of reviews of Encounters with Civilizations

- Aleaz, B., The Statesman (Calcutta), 27 April 2008, p. 17.
- Gispert-Sauch, G., Journal of Theological Reflection, Vol. 76, No. 1, January 2012, pp. 79–80.
- Pabla, P. K., International Journal on Humanistic Ideology, Vol. 2, Issue 2, Autumn - Winter 2009, pp. 179–182.
- Paul, C. M., Review for The Herald Weekly, (Calcutta, India) June 2012.
- Roberge, R., Albanian Journal of Politics (Chapel Hill, NC, USA: Globic Press), .Vol. 3, Issue 2, December 2007, pp. 176–179.
- Schwartz, S., ‘How we speak of Mother Teresa...’, Folks Magazine (New Delhi, India), 9 January 2012.
- Shoesmith, B., Continuum: Journal of Media & Cultural Studies, Vol. 24, Issue 2, 2010, pp. 323–325.
- Smetherham, C., Albanian Journal of Politics, Vol. 4, Issue 2, December 2008, pp. 126–128.
- Young, A., Central & Eastern European Review Journal, Vol. 2, September 2008, pp. 104–107.
