= Karl Wenclas =

Karl "King" Wenclas (born in Detroit, Michigan) is a founder and the former Publicity Director and front man of the Underground Literary Alliance. (The moniker "King" was taken from a critic of the ULA.) After ceasing publication of his zine New Philistine, Wenclas returned to writing at the urging of fellow underground zinesters Michael Jackman and Steve Kostecke, both of whom founded the ULA with Wenclas in 2000. His essay "How to Create a Literary Movement", published in Zine World: A Reader's Guide to the Underground Press, launched the idea of the ULA. Wenclas likens his brand of "ballyhoo" to the tactics of famous promoters including P.T. Barnum, Brian Epstein and Malcolm McLaren. A quote: "The entire history of rock music is a history of ballyhoo."

After leaving the ULA, Wenclas left Philadelphia to return to his birthplace and devote himself to his many blogs. His philosophy, particularly as conveyed via his flagship blog, Attacking The Demi-Puppets, (https://www.kingwenclas.blogspot.com/) centers on several related core beliefs: that the literary world is unhealthily centered in New York City, that the literary world is overly insular, and that American literature itself as a cultural force is stagnant. In opposition to what he sees as the corrupt status quo, Wenclas offers up works that exist outside of the mainstream. Generally, these works appear to be limited mostly to DIY authors, as exemplified by members of the ULA.

Critics have observed that Wenclas' arguments are weakened by his unwillingness to acknowledge the world of literature that exists between the poles represented by the "establishment" and the "underground" as exemplified by the ULA and other DIYers.

In August 2014, Wenclas became co-editor at New Pop Lit (http://newpoplit.com/).
