= Underground Literary Alliance =

Philadelphia, U.S. based writer and zinester group

The Underground Literary Alliance is a Philadelphia-based and internationally membered group of writers, zinesters and DIY writers. They seek to expose what they see as the corruption and insularity in the American book-publishing establishment while providing alternative avenues for writers who don't easily fit into mainstream institutions and agendas.

Among many other activities, they have gained considerable attention for their exposure of an insular literary practice whereby establishment authors serve on juries to award monetary prizes to their writing friends. In particular they have been able to point out cases where the prizewinning authors are in fact already wealthy, and thus can be seen as taking money from other authors who actually need it.

In general the ULA favors direct, vernacular writing over the more cryptic and mannered styles of the present-day academy. They present their literary aesthetic in their communal lit-zine, Slush Pile.

A quote from Karl Wenclas, the organization's Publicity Director: "The Underground Literary Alliance is the most controversial writers' group in America. We stand up for writers, expose corruption in the publishing world, and work to create a fun & exciting alternative to the literary mainstream."

== History ==
The Underground Literary Alliance has its roots in the independent zine scene that flourished in the 1990s. The founders of the group were zinesters who connected with each other through A Reader's Guide to the Underground Press or through other underground writers. These founders, and their zines, were: Karl Wenclas, New Philistine; Michael Jackman, inspector 18; Steve Kostecke, Seoul in Slices; Joe Smith, The Die; Ann Sterzinger, Bottle-Fed; and Doug Bassett, a literary theorist. The six of them met in Hoboken, New Jersey, in October, 2000, in order to launch the group and commence their activism by signing a statement of protest against a Guggenheim grant given to Rick Moody, an already-wealthy writer. The text of the statement read as follows:

"We the undersigned protest the year 2000 Guggenheim grant to well-known author Rick Moody, because it exemplifies the practice of giving financial assistance to already successful and affluent writers, well-connected, who clearly don’t need the help while other writers abjectly struggle and because this runs counter to the implicit charitable purpose behind the tax-exempt status of a foundation like John Simon Guggenheim."

In addition to the six who met in Hoboken, this protest was later signed by over 30 other zinesters. It was also sent out to approximately 300 of the American lit world’s biggest-named writers, editors, and agents—but none of them signed.

Since its founding, the ULA has constantly engaged in its own brand of “literary activism” which has gained the group a notoriety for exposing what they see as corruption in the American literary world and for harshly criticizing corporate-promulgated literary fiction.

Current ULA members include Patrick Simonelli, editor of litvision.org, Leopold McGinnis, author of Game Quest, Tom Hendricks, creator of the Zine Hall of Fame, and poet Frank Walsh.

The ULA launched its own independent press in 2006.

As of December 1, 2010, the Underground Literary Alliance appeared disbanded, with no viable webpage. Co-founder Steve Kostecke died in April 2011.

== Literary activism ==
=== Guggenheim grant protest ===
In late 2000, the six founders of the ULA signed a protest against the $35,000 Guggenheim grant awarded to Rick Moody, an already-wealthy author.

=== Debate with George Plimpton and The Paris Review ===
In early 2001, the ULA held a press conference at CBGBs in New York City which was attended by George Plimpton, staffers at The Paris Review, and staffers of Open City magazine. The ULA debated with those who attended about what they perceive to be the irrelevancy and lack of integrity of the current realm of corporate/academia-sponsored literature.

=== KGB crash ===
In early 2001, the ULA crashed a literati reading at KGB in New York City. The members present disrupted the reading with arguments about how literature has died under the current corporate system – and were then thrown out of the venue.

=== Firecracker Awards ===
Late 2001, the ULA protested against McSweeney's Quarterly Concern being awarded Best Zine of the Year by the Firecracker Alternative Books Award because they felt McSweeney’s did not fit an accepted definition of zine.

=== Perceived cronyism in the literary world ===
The ULA protested the 2002 National Endowment for the Arts (NEA) award of $20,000 to Jonathan Franzen, an already-wealthy author and highly publicized best-selling author of The Corrections. Rick Moody was on the NEA panel, and the ULA contested that this was an example of the literati insularly awarding each other.

=== Housing Works ===
In early 2003, members of the ULA were kicked out of a reading at Housing Works in New York City for requesting a discussion of issues, including a looming war. They stated that they were confronting the writers about what they saw as a lack of social or political relevancy to the stories being read that night.

=== Amazon.com and the New York Times article ===
In early 2004, a glitch at Amazon.com revealed that Dave Eggers (of McSweeney’s and The Believer magazine) had posted an anonymous response to reviews he believed were posted by ULA members (as reported by The New York Times). David Eggers suggested that a series of negative reviews at amazon.com were the result of ULA members retaliating against an article about them in The Believer. As a policy, the ULA does nothing anonymously, and says the negative reviews were not posted by members of the ULA.

=== Howl protest and the Associated Press podcast ===
In April 2006, the ULA protested against the reading of Allen Ginsberg’s Howl at Miller Theater at Columbia University, which was hosted by elite literati and had no representation of the "underground", from which the Beat Generation had sprung. The AP covered the protest and reported on it by means of a podcast.

=== Peter Matthiessen and the CIA connection ===
In January, 2007, The New York Times reported that Peter Matthiessen had been working for the CIA at the time of the founding of The Paris Review, and that for two years he used the magazine as his cover. This article publicized the fact first revealed by Matthiessen himself to author Frances Stonor Saunders in her 1999 book "The Cultural Cold War." The ULA also reported the connection between the CIA and Matthiessen, in May, 2005, in an article by Richard Cummings, who has described himself as "a member of the Association of Former Intelligence Officers, having served on the Board of the AFIO-New England chapter." The ULA article also went on to allege that The Paris Review exercised covert influence over the London Review of Books.
