= Maddox (given name) =

Male given name

- Gender: Primarily masculine

Origin
- Language: Welsh
- Meaning: "fortunate", son of Madoc.
- Region of origin: Wales

Other names
- Related names: Madoc

Maddox is a mainly male name in use in English speaking countries derived from a Welsh surname meaning "son of Madoc". The name Madoc means "fortunate" and is derived from the Welsh word mad. Madoc or Madog was a legendary Welsh prince who in Welsh folklore sailed to the New World three hundred years before Christopher Columbus.

== Usage ==
The name has increased in popularity in the United States, where it was ranked among the top 1,000 names for boys since 2003 and among the top 200 since 2009. It is also in occasional use for American girls. There were 109 American girls given the name in 2021 and 2,201 American boys. The increase in usage has been attributed to its use by Angelina Jolie for the son she adopted in 2002.

== See also ==
- Madox, given name and surname
- Maddox (surname)
