= Bronwen Maddox =

British journalist

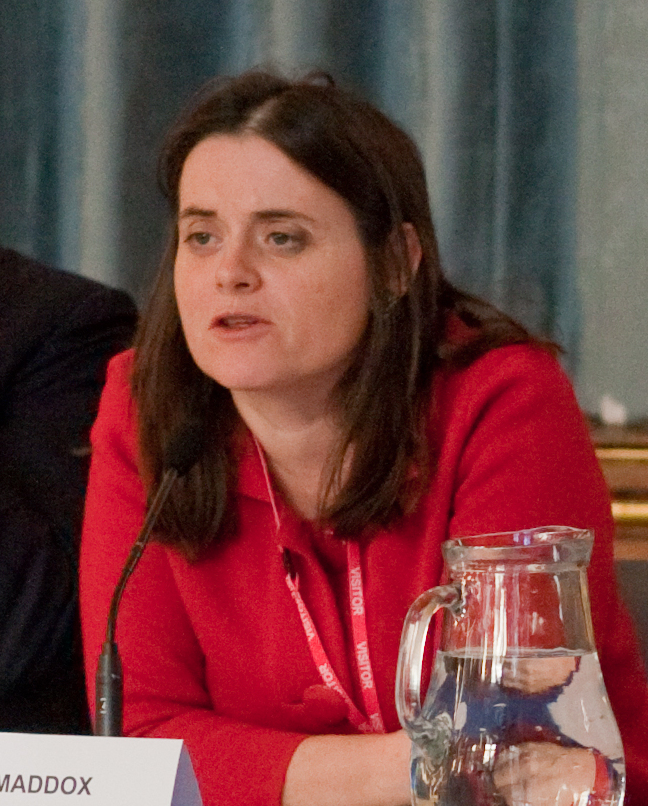
- Maddox in 2010
- Born: Bronwen Maria Maddox; 7 May 1963 (age 63); New York City, US
- Education: St Paul's Girls' School; Westminster School; University of Oxford
- Occupations: Director and CEO, Chatham House
- Children: 1 daughter

Bronwen Maria Maddox (born 7 May 1963) is a former journalist who has served as the director and CEO of think tank Chatham House since August 2022. Prior to this, she was the Director of the Institute for Government between 2016 and 2022. Maddox is also a former foreign editor of The Times newspaper and editor of current affairs magazine Prospect.

== Early life and education ==
Bronwen Maria Maddox was born on 7 May 1963 in New York City to Welsh science writer John Royden Maddox, and American journalist and biographer Brenda Maddox. Her younger brother is novelist and journalist Bruno Maddox. She also has two stepsisters and two stepbrothers. Her early education was at the independent St Paul's Girls' School, and Westminster School in London. She then studied philosophy, politics and economics at St John's College, Oxford.

== Career ==
Maddox's first job after graduation in 1985 was as an investment analyst at the private equity firm Charterhouse Capital Partners. She left the company in 1986 to join the investment bank Kleinwort Benson, where she was promoted to director of their media investment team.

She became an investigative reporter for the newspaper Financial Times in 1991, and was later promoted to leader writer. While at the newspaper, she ran the paper's year-long investigation into the publishing tycoon Robert Maxwell. Five years later, she joined The Times newspaper, where she was initially the US editor and Washington Bureau Chief before becoming the foreign editor in 1999. Maddox wrote the book In Defence of America. In 2010, Maddox left the newspaper to become the chief executive and editor of the current affairs magazine Prospect. She resigned from the magazine on 20 June 2016.

In September 2016, she became the director of the think tank Institute for Government. She is also a non-executive board member of the Law Commission since 9 November 2016, the independent body set up by Parliament to review and recommend reform of the law in England and Wales. Since 2003, she has been a governor of the Ditchley Foundation and she is a former member of its council. Maddox is a former trustee of the Imperial War Museum.

In August 2022, Maddox became the director and CEO of the think tank Chatham House.

== Personal life ==
Maddox has one daughter.

== Works ==
- In Defence of America, London: Duckworth, 2009. ISBN 9780715637920, OCLC 403437723
