= Nora Barnacle =

Muse and wife of James Joyce (1884–1951)

Nora Barnacle Joyce
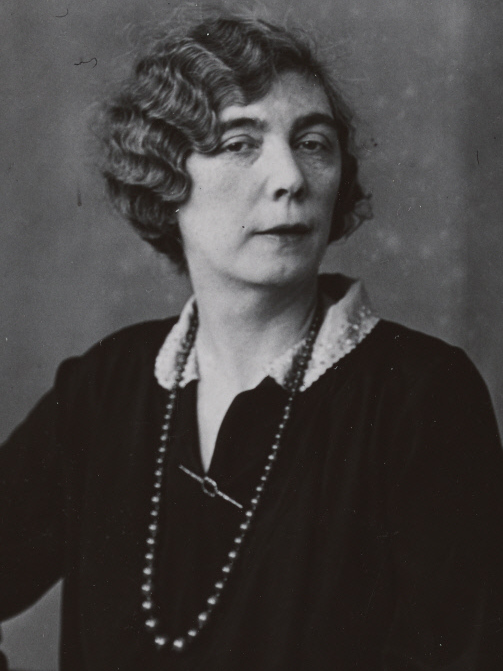
- Nora Barnacle, c. 1926 in this cropped photograph by Berenice Abbott
- Born: Norah Barnacle; 21 March 1884; Galway, Ireland
- Died: 10 April 1951 (aged 67); Zurich, Switzerland
- Spouse: James Joyce (m. 1931; died 1941)
- Children: 2, including Lucia Joyce
- Relatives: Stephen James Joyce (grandson)

Nora Barnacle Joyce (born Norah Barnacle; 21 March 1884 – 10 April 1951) was the muse and wife of Irish author James Joyce.

Barnacle and Joyce's life together has been the subject of much popular interest. Nora Barnacle, a 1980 play by Maureen Charlton, was made about their relationship. Barnacle was the subject of a 1988 biography, Nora: A Biography of Nora Joyce, by Brenda Maddox, which was adapted into a 2000 Irish film, Nora, directed by Pat Murphy, and starring Susan Lynch and Ewan McGregor.

== Early life ==
Barnacle was born in a Galway workhouse on 21 March 1884. Her entry in the birth register, which gives her first name as "Norah" (the spelling she used until she met Joyce), is dated 22 March. Her father, Thomas Barnacle, a baker in Connemara, was an illiterate man who was 38 years old when she was born. Her mother, Annie Honoria Healy, was 28 and worked as a dressmaker. The unusual surname Barnacle is derived from the Irish Ó Cadhain, usually anglicised as Coyne, Kyne, or Cohen or Coen, but in Irish, cadhan means "wild goose", and some families made the translation to Barnacle, after the barnacle goose.

From 1886 to 1889, Barnacle's parents sent her to live with her maternal grandmother Catherine Mortimer Healy. During these years, she began studies at a convent, eventually graduating from a national school in 1891. In 1896, 12-year-old Barnacle completed her schooling and began to work as a porteress and laundress. In the same year, her mother threw her father out for drinking and the couple separated. Barnacle went to live with her mother and her uncle, Tom Healy, at 4 Bowling Green, Galway. This house has since been converted into a small museum dedicated to Nora.

In 1896, at age 12, Barnacle fell in love with a teenager named Michael Feeney, who died soon after of typhoid and pneumonia. In a dramatic coincidence, another boy she loved, Michael Bodkin, died in 1900 – causing some of her friends to call her "man-killer". Joyce later referenced these incidents in the final short story in Dubliners, "The Dead". It was rumoured that she sought comfort from her friend, budding English theatre starlet Laura London, who introduced her to a Protestant named Willie Mulvagh. In 1903, she left Galway after her uncle learned of the affair and friendship, and went to Dublin where she worked as a chambermaid at Finn's Hotel (later the name of the hotel was used as the title for a posthumously published collection of ten short narrative pieces written by Joyce, Finn's Hotel, in 2013).

== Relationship with Joyce ==
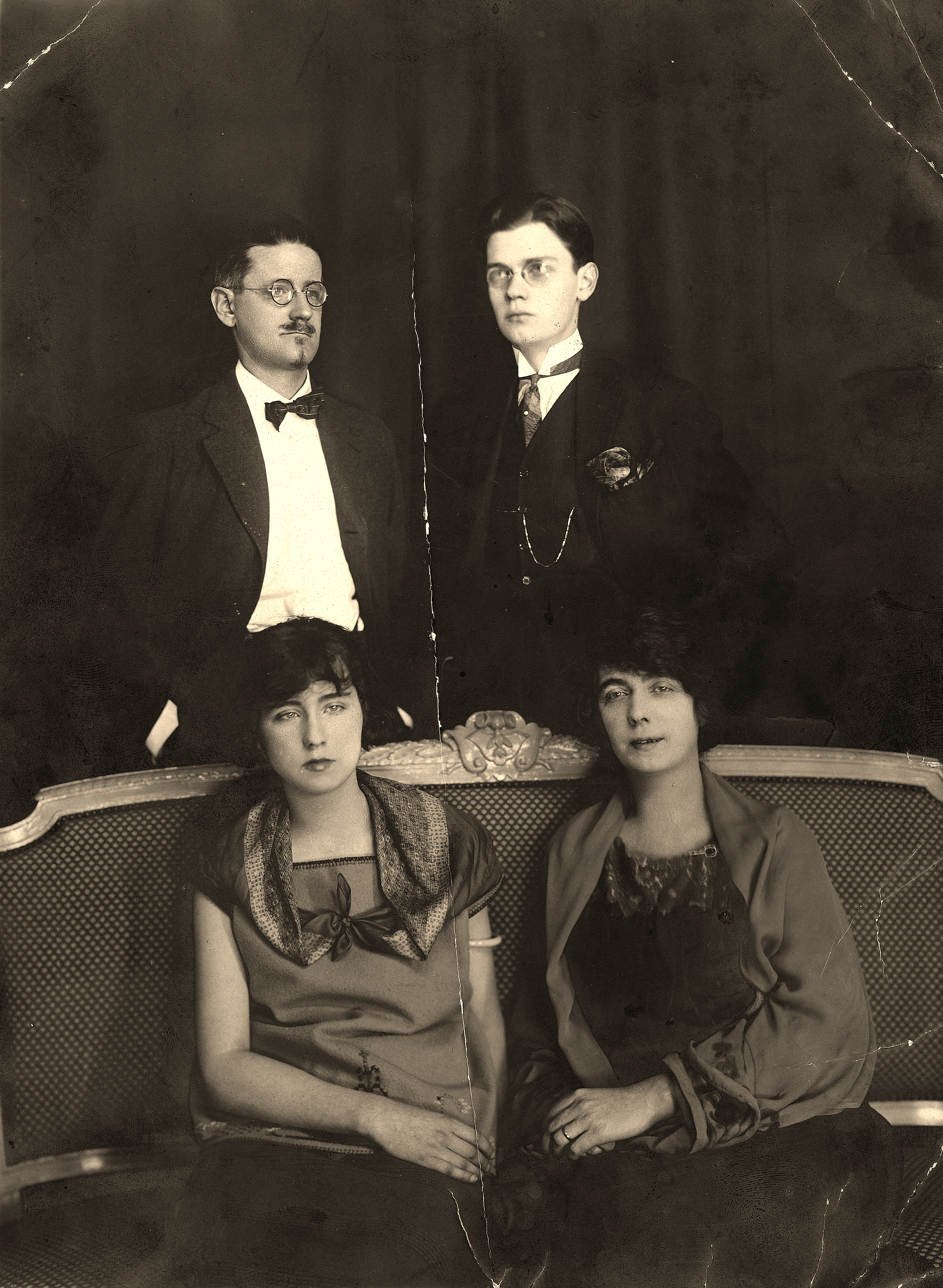
Paris 1924: Clockwise from top left – James Joyce, Giorgio Joyce, Nora Barnacle, Lucia Joyce

Barnacle met Joyce on 10 June 1904 while in Dublin and they had their first romantic liaison on 16 June. Joyce later chose 16 June 1904 as the date for the setting for his novel Ulysses and the date has come to be known and celebrated around the world as Bloomsday. The 1904 rendezvous began a long relationship that eventually led to marriage in 1931 and continued until Joyce's death.

Barnacle's and Joyce's relationship was complex. They had different personalities, tastes and cultural interests. Of their first meeting, she recalled: "I mistook him for a Swedish sailor – His electric blue eyes, yachting cap and plimsolls. But when he spoke, well then, I knew him at once for just another Dublin jackeen chatting up a country girl." The numerous erotic letters they exchanged suggest they loved each other passionately. These are also of interest because of Joyce's lifelong dislike of swearing and crude language. Joyce seems to have admired and trusted her, and Barnacle clearly loved Joyce and trusted him enough to agree to leave Ireland with him for continental Europe. In anticipation of the move to Paris, she began studying French.

In 1904, Barnacle and Joyce left Ireland for Trieste (at that time in Austria-Hungary). On 27 June 1905, Nora Barnacle gave birth to a son, Giorgio and later to a daughter, Lucia, on 26 July 1907. A miscarriage in 1908 coincided with the beginning of a difficult time for both. Though she remained by his side, and the couple were legally married in London in 1931, she complained to her sister both about his personal qualities and his writings. In these letters to her sister, she said he drank too much and wasted too much money. As for his literary activity, she lamented that his writings were obscure and lacking in sense. She was always fiercely proud of him, although she occasionally expressed impatience at his meetings with other artists and admitted she would have preferred him to have been a musician—in his youth, he was a talented singer—rather than a writer.

Lucia's mental illness, which became acute in the early 1930s, posed another challenge to the couple's relationship. Nora believed the condition required hospitalisation, which Joyce opposed. They brought in many specialists, and Lucia was for a time the patient of Carl Jung. She was diagnosed with schizophrenia and admitted to a clinic in 1936. Her father visited her there often, but not her mother. As Nora's biographer Brenda Maddox recorded, "Lucia was rarely out of Nora's mind. Because she had aroused Lucia's most florid schizophrenic reactions, Nora was not allowed to accompany Joyce on his ritual Sunday afternoon visits to Ivry. Not only did this exclude her from any contact with her daughter, it also required her to spend much of each week arranging for someone to accompany Joyce, who could not easily go alone ... Joyce liked to portray himself as safe from Lucia's violence as if he was the only other permitted inhabitant of her private world. Yet once when Giorgio went with his father, Lucia saw them and cried, 'Che bello! Che bello!' then lunged and tried to strangle them." As Maddox also noted, "There is no record that Nora ever saw her daughter again."

== Later life and death ==
After Joyce's death in Zurich in 1941, Nora decided to remain there for the rest of her days. She died in Zurich of acute kidney failure in 1951, at age 67. She was buried at Fluntern Cemetery, by her husband's side. Their son Giorgio was buried with them in 1976.

== Legacy ==
In 1980, the play Nora Barnacle by Maureen Charlton, depicting the life of Barnacle and Joyce, debuted at the Dublin Theatre Festival. The Washington Post described the play as "the finest piece of theatre at this or at other theatre festival since The Cherry Orchard with Siobhán McKenna in 1968".

In 1988, Nora Barnacle was the subject of a biography by Brenda Maddox, Nora: A Biography of Nora Joyce. In 2000, this biography was adapted into the film Nora directed by Pat Murphy, starring Susan Lynch and Ewan McGregor.

In 2004, an erotic letter from Joyce to Barnacle sold at Sotheby's for £240,800, a record amount for a modern-day letter at auction.

A novel, Nora, by Nuala O'Connor, was published in 2021.

In 2023, Mary Morrissy published Penelope Unbound, a novel which imagined a different outcome to the life of Nora Barnacle and Joyce after they arrived in Trieste in 1904.

Nora's childhood home in Bowling Green, Galway has been converted into the Nora Barnacle House Museum, a small museum dedicated to her life.

== Sources ==
- Bowker, Gordon (2012). James Joyce: A New Biography. Farrar, Straus and Giroux. ISBN 978-0-374-17872-7. OCLC 802264865.
- Ellmann, Richard (1982) [1959]. James Joyce. Oxford University Press. ISBN 978-0-19-503103-4. OCLC 82514111.
- McCourt, John (2000). The Years of Bloom: James Joyce in Trieste, 1904–1920. Lilliput Press. ISBN 1-901866-45-9. OCLC 1091015013.
- Pelaschiar, Laura (1999). "Stanislaus Joyce's Book of Days: The Triestine Diary". James Joyce Quarterly. 36 (2): 61–71. JSTOR 25473993.
