= Tom Hendricks =

American rock musician

Tom Hendricks is an American Dallas-based musician, painter, writer, and creator of a zine called Musea.

== Musea ==
Hendricks is the creator of the Musea zine which has been published since 1992 and currently has 196 issues. It includes reviews, art discussions, and often, articles about the problems with music and other forms of art being controlled by large corporations or institutions. Musea generally favors independent, local music and art. The zine is little known outside of the 'zine' community or his hometown, Dallas, Texas.

== Music ==
Hendricks records music under the name Hunkasaurus and His Pet Dog Guitar, and he performed concerts from 1996 to 2014 in the box office at the Inwood Theatre, a well-known Dallas arthouse theatre where he was working. Minor publicity for these unusual performances was mentioned in January '06 Texas Monthly Magazine and in the May '04 Dallas Observer. Hendricks' music for the most part is standard rock, blues, and folk on his Silvertone Standard guitar, but in his zine, on Usenet, and on the jackets of his self-released CDs, Hendricks complains that "bands" (meaning groups using standard rock instrumentation) are derivative and that it's time for a new form of post-rock-band music he calls "Postism." In 2015 Hendricks released a 150-song, 9-CD boxed set titled Hunkasaurus and His Pet Dog Guitar Outside the Box Set.

== Other activities ==
Hendricks is also a poster to Usenet with thousands of posts, which are often taken from or related to Musea. He is regularly accused of trolling and starting flame wars with his rants about the arts and music business. His posts are sometimes a bit off-topic. In Feb. 2015, Hendricks released on the net a short novel called Library Planet.

Hendricks was the "Cultural Affairs" editor of the Underground Literary Alliance, a reviewer for Zine World, and has written an article for the David Darling science website.
