= Tim Challies =

Canadian author, blogger and pastor

Tim Challies (born 1976) is a Canadian Reformed Baptist theologian, pastor, blogger, and author.

== Career ==
In 2003, Challies started a blog on theology, book reviews, and social commentary. He has published books on theology, among other topics, such as how Christians should approach common issues like technology and pornography.

He co-founded the publishing house Cruciform Press with Kevin Meath in 2010.

In 2013, he became pastor at Grace Fellowship Church of Toronto, a Reformed Baptist church.

In 2017, Challies gained media attention after stating that he does not let his children have sleep-overs except with close relatives. Challies explained that he places this precaution on his evaluated risk of how children can encounter "pornography, sexuality and drinking while at friends' homes."

R. Albert Mohler, Jr. has mentioned Challies as "one of the finest young evangelical thinkers of our day."

== Personal life ==
Challies is married with three children. His son, Nicholas Paul Challies (Nick), died suddenly on November 3, 2020.

== Books ==
- The Discipline of Spiritual Discernment (Crossway, 2008)
- Sexual Detox: A Guide for Guys Who Are Sick of Porn (Cruciform Press, 2010)
- Do More Better: A Practical Guide to Productivity (Cruciform Press, 2015)
- Visual Theology (with Josh Byers - Zondervan, 2016)
- The Next Story: Faith, Friends, Family, and the Digital World (Thomas Nelson, 2015)
- The Character of the Christian (Cruciform Press, 2017)
- Set an Example (Cruciform Press, 2017)
- Help! My Kids Are Viewing Pornography (Shepherd Press, 2017)
- The Commandment We Forgot (Cruciform Press, 2017)
- Devoted: Great Men and Their Godly Moms (Cruciform Press, 2018)
- Advance! (Cruciform Press, 2018)
- Aging Gracefully (Cruciform Press, 2018)
- Run to Win: The Lifelong Pursuits of a Godly Man (Cruciform Press, 2018)
