= John Maddox (cricketer) =

Australian cricketer

Personal information
- Born: 30 December 1930 (age 95); St Mary's, Tasmania, Australia

Domestic team information
- Years: Team
- 1951-1957: Tasmania
- Source: Cricinfo, 9 March 2016

John Maddox (born 30 December 1930) is an Australian former cricketer. He played eight first-class matches for Tasmania between 1951 and 1957.

== See also ==
- List of Tasmanian representative cricketers
