= Lew Maddox =

American politician

Member of the U.S. House of Representatives from Missouri's 163rd district

Missouri House of Representatives
- In office 1971–1989

Personal details
- Born: 1924
- Died: 2008 (aged 83–84) Cape Girardeau, Missouri
- Resting place: Stanfield Cemetery at Clarkton, Missouri
- Party: Democratic
- Spouse: Rebecca James
- Children: 4 (2 sons, 2 daughters)
- Occupation: contractor, land owner

L. W. "Lew" Maddox (March 25, 1924 - April 28, 2008) was a Democratic politician who served 18 years in the Missouri House of Representatives. He was born was educated in elementary and high school in Gideon, Missouri. On July 3, 1953, he married Rebecca James in Hollywood, California.
