= Gëzim Alpion =

Albanian sociologist

- Education: Cairo University BA; Durham University PhD
- Notable work: Mother Teresa: Saint or Celebrity?

Gëzim Alpion is an Albanian academic and civil activist. He is currently based in the Department of Sociology at the University of Birmingham, United Kingdom.

== Education and career ==
Alpion earned a B.A. from Cairo University in 1989 and a PhD from Durham University, United Kingdom in 1997.

In 2002, he was appointed to the Department of Sociology at the University of Birmingham, after previous lecturing at the University of Huddersfield, Sheffield Hallam University and Newman University. In 2010, he joined Birmingham's Department of Political Science and International Studies and in 2016 the Department of Social Policy, Sociology and Criminology.

Alpion's research area deals with the sociology of religion, nationalism, fame, race, media, film and authorship. He has written extensively about Mother Teresa and is considered an expert on her life.

Alpion's main publications to date include: Mother Teresa: Saint or Celebrity? (2007), Foreigner Complex: Essays and Fiction about Egypt (2002), and Encounters with Civilizations: From Alexander the Great to Mother Teresa (2011).

Alpion is also a playwright; his plays Vouchers (2001) and If Only the Dead Could Listen (2008) address the treatment of refugees and asylum seekers in the West. Sponsored by Arts Council England, the plays have been successfully performed across the UK.

== Activism ==
=== Construction of the Arbëri Road ===
In March 2013, Alpion began an online petition for the Albanian government to complete the construction of the Arbëri Road, a highway linking Albania's capital Tirana with his native Dibra, one of the most impoverished and neglected regions in Albania. The proposal would significantly lessen the travel time between the two areas as well as ensure Macedonia, Kosovo and Bulgaria gain unprecedented access to the Adriatic Sea, contributing further to the EU integration of this area of the Balkans. In May 2014, Alpion was received by the President of Albania, Bujar Nishani, the Speaker of Parliament, Ilir Meta, and the Minister of Transport and Infrastructure, Edmond Haxhinasto, and hosted a roundtable discussion in Tirana with a number of Albanian MPs where they discussed the Arbëri Road. The petition was covered in Albanian and British media, but the road has since not been constructed yet.

=== Canonization of Mother Teresa ===
In 2014, Alpion led an online campaign for the canonization of Mother Teresa, with an online petition of over 1500 signatures. Mother Teresa was canonized in 2016.

== Personal life ==
Alpion is married and has two children.

== Books ==
- Alpion, G., Vouchers: A Tragedy, Birmingham, UK: University of Birmingham CPS, 2001.
- Alpion, G., Foreigner Complex: Essays and Fiction about Egypt, Birmingham, UK: University of Birmingham CPS, 2002.
- Alpion, G., Mother Teresa: Saint or Celebrity? London and New York: Routledge, 2007 (simultaneously published in the UK, the US and Canada); Indian Edition (in English), New Delhi: Routledge India, 2008; Italian Edition (in Italian), Rome, 2008.
- Alpion, G., If Only the Dead Could Listen, Chapel Hill, NC, USA: Globic Press, 2008.
- Alpion, G., Encounters with Civilizations: From Alexander the Great to Mother Teresa, New Brunswick and London: Transaction Publishers, 2011.
- Alpion, G., Mother Teresa: The Saint and Her Nation (reprint ed.), Bloomsbury, 2021.
