= Tracy Maddux =

American music business executive

Tracy Maddux is an American business executive. He is the current interim CEO of music funding company beatBread. He was CEO of Portland, Oregon-based CD Baby from 2012 through 2020 during which time the company grew significantly during the transition from physical to digital and streaming music formats. During Maddux’s tenure at CD Baby, the company evolved into one of the largest platforms for creator direct music distribution.

== Education ==
Maddux received a BA in Government from the University of Texas at Austin in 1991 and an MBA in Finance and IT from Indiana University's Kelley School of Business in 1998.

== Career ==
After a stint in finance at Intel, from 2001-2009, Maddux became COO/President of Logic General, a manufacturer of CDs and DVDs for the software and music industries. In that role he began pressing discs for independent music labels.

Maddux became COO of Portland, Oregon-based CD Baby in 2010, and CEO in 2012. CD Baby was Oregon's largest music employer in 2019.

Throughout his time at CD Baby, Maddux expedited the digitization of the business and led the company through major growth. CD Baby evolved into the leading platform for creator direct music distribution, making music accessible on platforms like Apple Music, YouTube, and Spotify. This growth was driven via strategic acquisitions of Show.co, Loudr Distribution, AudioMicro, AdRev, and DashGo, that collectively formed AVL Digital Group.

In March 2019, music-rights management company Downtown Music Holdings purchased CD Baby's parent company, AVL Digital Group, from Disc Makers for more than $200 million. Maddux was CEO of AVL, which operates as a separate subsidiary. In 2019 he oversaw partnerships between CD Baby and automatic content recognition platform Audible Magic and automated mastering platform CloudBounce. In November 2020, Maddux was promoted to Chief Commercial Officer at Downtown Music Holdings, where he led a series of international music technology acquisitions, adding Fuga (NL) and Simbals (FR) in 2020, Found.ee in 2021 and Curve Royalty Systems (UK) in 2022. He was in this role until November 2023.

In November 2025, Maddux was named beatBread's interim CEO to lead the indie financer as its board of directors searches for a permanent replacement for late founder and CEO Peter Sinclair.

== Honors ==
In August 2018, Billboard named Maddux to its Indie Power Players list. He appeared on the 2019 Indie Power Players list as well, citing "scaling the global CD Baby team" as his greatest recent accomplishment and pointing to the company's presence in "nine countries, including Argentina, Brazil, Canada, Colombia, Chile, Mexico, Singapore and the U.K."
