= Mother Teresa: Saint or Celebrity? =

2007 book by Gëzim Alpion

- Cover of the first edition, by Corbis
- Author: Gëzim Alpion
- Language: English
- Publisher: Routledge
- Publication date: 2007
- Publication place: United Kingdom
- Media type: Print (Paperback)

Mother Teresa: Saint or Celebrity? is a 2007 book written by the Albanian sociologist Gëzim Alpion, about Mother Teresa.

== Background ==
According to Stephen Schwartz, Gëzim Alpion is "a pioneer in the academic study of the phenomenon of celebrity", and "the most authoritative English-language author on Blessed Teresa of Kolkata".

Alpion's first study on Mother Teresa "Media, ethnicity and patriotism: The Balkans ‘unholy war’ for the appropriation of Mother Teresa", was published in the Journal of Southern Europe and the Balkans (now Journal of Balkan and Near Eastern Studies), in 2004. This was followed by the article "Media and celebrity culture: subjectivist, structuralist and post-structuralist approaches to Mother Teresa’s celebrity status", which was published in Continuum: Journal of Media & Cultural Studies in 2006.

== Overview ==
In Mother Teresa: Saint or Celebrity?, Gëzim Alpion explored the significance of Mother Teresa to the mass media, to celebrity culture, to the Church, and to various political and national groups. Drawing on new research on Mother Teresa's early years, Alpion charted her rise to fame, investigating the celebrity discourse in which a nun was turned into a media and humanitarian icon. The book talks about the cultural and critical analysis of Mother Teresa and the way she and others created, promoted, and censored her public image in the context of the sociology of fame, media, religion, and nationality. One section explores the ways different vested interests sought to appropriate the nun after her death, and also examines Mother Teresa's own attitude to her childhood and to the Balkan conflicts in the 1980s and 1990s.

Referring to Mother Teresa: Saint or Celebrity?, Stephen Schwartz holds that "in its depth, breadth, and seriousness", this monograph "may stand for some time to come as the single most important biography of Mother Teresa in English". In his review of the book which appeared in the American Communication Journal, Marvin Williams contends that

Alpion’s examination of Mother Teresa’s celebrity is a case study of corporate identity management in today’s global media environment. His weaving of primary texts into the setting of this character piece creates a comprehensive cross-cultural examination that has the potential to become a new archetypal work of this mercurial personality.
