= Maddix =

Maddix is a surname. It may refer to:

- Danny Maddix (born 1967), English-born Jamaican footballer
- Jamali Maddix (born 1991), English stand-up comedian
- Robert Maddix (born 1960), Canadian civil servant and political figure of Acadian origin

== See also ==
- Maddox (surname)
- Maddux (surname)
