= Eric Maddox =

American author and motivational speaker

Eric Maddox is an American public speaker, author and former special operations soldier. He was attached to a Task Force Special Operations team in Tikrit that was part of the Joint Special Operations Command responsible for tracking down the most wanted men in Iraq. During his six month tour with this Task Force team, Eric conducted over 300 interrogations and collected intelligence which directly led to the capture of Saddam Hussein.

== Early life ==
Eric Maddox graduated from Sapulpa High School in 1990. He is a native of Sapulpa, Oklahoma. He majored in political science at the University of Oklahoma and decided to join the Army during his senior year.

== Military career ==
Maddox enlisted as an infantry paratrooper for the 82nd Airborne Division in 1994. He completed Airborne School and Ranger School. After three years in the infantry he re-enlisted as an interrogator and trained as a Mandarin Chinese linguist. He was later stationed at the United States embassy in Beijing and in Los Angeles. Before 2003 he was assigned to the Defense Intelligence Agency, where he had no opportunity to interrogate prisoners.

=== Search for Saddam Hussein ===
Maddox arrived in Iraq in July 2003. He was sent to Tikrit and attached to a Delta Force team, for which he questioned the prisoners taken in its raids. He had not conducted an interrogation before. He has said that the confrontational methods the Army had taught him did not work on the detainees. He questioned more than 300 people in Tikrit.

Maddox built link diagrams of the families and associates of Hussein's former bodyguards. According to a 2010 series by Chris Wilson in Slate, the diagrams were similar to those made by the intelligence staff of Colonel Jim Hickey's brigade of the 4th Infantry Division. Both groups believed that the way to Hussein lay through little-known people in and around Tikrit and not through senior figures of the former government. The interrogations pointed to Mohammad Ibrahim Omar al-Musslit, a former bodyguard and a relative of Hussein.

In December 2003 Maddox moved to Baghdad as his assignment was ending. After a raid on a house there, he identified al-Musslit among the hooded prisoners who had been brought in and questioned him in the hours before his own flight out of Iraq. Maddox has said that he offered to release about 40 detained relatives and associates of al-Musslit if the prisoner led the team to Hussein. Al-Musslit gave the location, a farm near Ad-Dawr. Hussein was captured there on December 13, 2003. Maddox had by then left for Doha and did not take part in the raid. He has said that he did not use torture, which he regards as ineffective.

Press accounts at the time of the capture did not mention Maddox, because of the secrecy around special operations. Within days of his return to the United States he met Donald Rumsfeld and George Tenet. Maddox was awarded the Legion of Merit, the National Intelligence Medal of Achievement, the Defense Intelligence Agency's Director's Award and the Bronze Star.

== Later career ==
Eric Maddox is a conference and motivational speaker teaching his interrogation methods and how perceived failure leads forward.

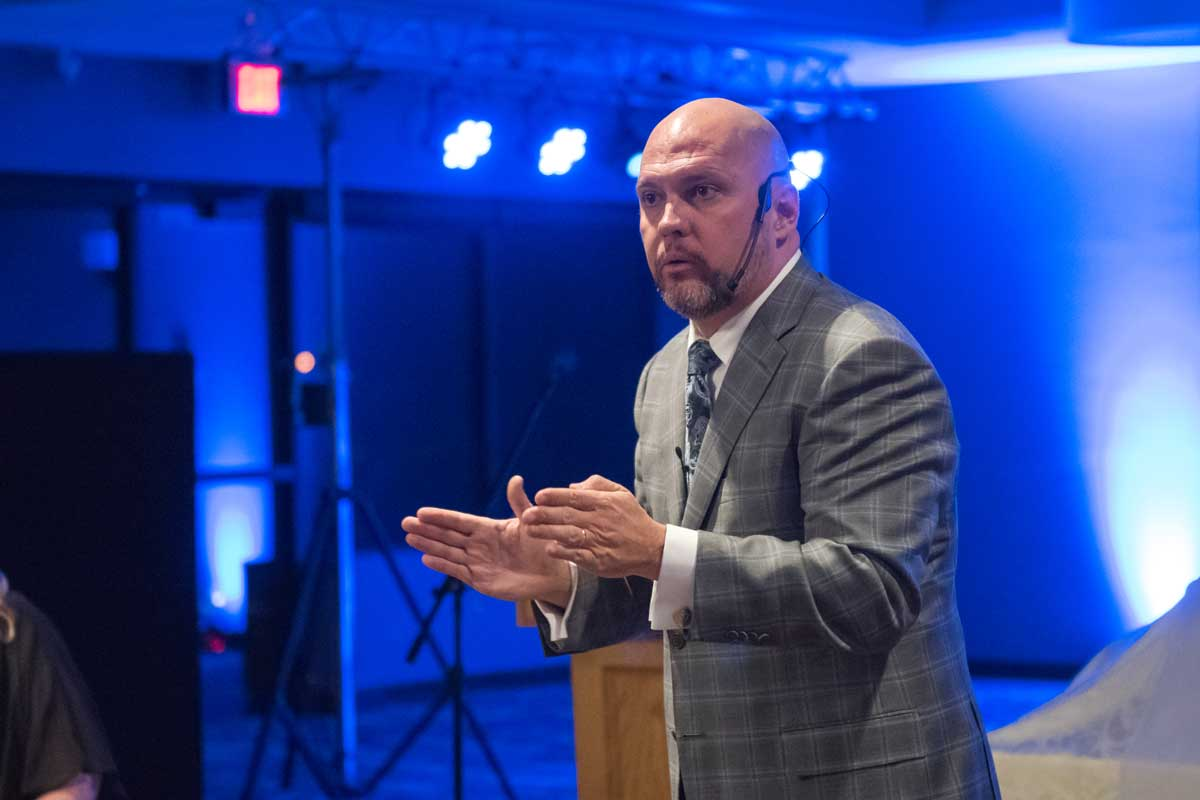
Maddox speaks about his experiences and his unique methodology.

Maddox created a unique methodology and technique for interrogation, which directly led to the capture of Saddam Hussein. Maddox teaches this unique methodology called 'Empathy Based Listening'.

== Awards ==
Maddox was awarded the Legion of Merit, the National Intelligence Medal of Achievement, the Defense Intelligence Agency’s Director’s Award and the Bronze Star.

== Books and movies ==
Maddox authored the book: Mission: Blacklist #1.
