= John Maddox =

Welsh theoretical chemist and editor (1925–2009)

Sir John Maddox FRS
- Maddox in 1988
- Born: John Royden Maddox; 27 November 1925; Penllergaer, Swansea, Wales, UK
- Died: 12 April 2009 (aged 83)
- Education: Christ Church, Oxford (BA); King's College, London
- Known for: Journalism; Editing
- Spouse: Brenda Maddox
- Children: 6, including Bronwen Maddox and Bruno Maddox
- Awards: FRS (2000)
- Scientific career
- Workplaces: University of Manchester; The Manchester Guardian; Nature
- Academic advisors: Charles Coulson

Sir John Royden Maddox, FRS (27 November 1925 – 12 April 2009) was a Welsh theoretical chemist, physicist, and science writer. He was an editor of Nature for 22 years, from 1966 to 1973 and 1980 to 1995.

== Education and early life ==
John Royden Maddox was born on 27 November 1925, at Penllergaer near Swansea, Wales. He was the son of Arthur Jack Maddox, a furnaceman at an aluminium plant. He was educated at Gowerton Boys' County School. From there, aged 15, he won a state scholarship to Christ Church, Oxford, where he read chemistry, and King's College London, where he studied physics.

== Career ==
From 1949 to 1955 Maddox lectured in theoretical physics at the University of Manchester.

He then became the science correspondent at The Manchester Guardian, a post he held until 1964.

From 1964 to 1966 he was the coordinator of the Nuffield Science Teaching Project; after which he was appointed editor of Nature, a role he held from 1966 to 1973 (and 1980 to 1995).

He was director of the Nuffield Foundation from 1975 to 1979.

From 1980 to 1995 he was again editor of Nature. In 1990, he publicly investigated homoeopathy claims.

=== Sheldrake editorial, 1981 ===
When the book A New Science of Life by British biologist Rupert Sheldrake was published in 1981, proposing the theory of morphic resonance instead of DNA as the basis for shapes and behaviour in nature, Maddox denounced it fiercely in an editorial titled "A book for burning?" in which he argued that Sheldrake's ideas were pseudoscience. Maddox concluded that the book should not be burned but placed "among the literature of intellectual aberrations". He elaborated in a 1994 BBC documentary on Sheldrake's theory:

I was so offended by it, that I said that while it's wrong that books should be burned, in practice, if book burning were allowed, this book would be a candidate [...] I think it's dangerous that people should be allowed by our liberal societies to put that kind of nonsense into currency. It's unnecessary to introduce magic into the explanation of physical and biological phenomena when in fact there is every likelihood that the continuation of research as it is now practised will indeed fill all the gaps that Sheldrake draws attention to. You see, Sheldrake's is not a scientific theory. Sheldrake is putting forward magic instead of science, and that can be condemned, with exactly the language that the popes used to condemn Galileo, and for the same reasons: it is heresy.

=== Stance on AIDS denial ===
Maddox is remembered for his opposition to the notion that AIDS is not caused by the HIV virus. As editor of Nature, in 1993 Maddox decided not to publish the words of Peter Duesberg, who had claimed AIDS was caused by drugs, because in Maddox's view the stakes were too high for such a prestigious journal to disseminate discredited views.

=== Stance on the Big Bang ===
In the late 1980s, as evidence for the Big Bang origin of the Universe accumulated, Maddox, who favoured the Steady State theory, penned an editorial denouncing the theory as "philosophically unacceptable" (because he saw it giving a foothold to creationists) and "over-simplistic" and he predicted its demise within a decade (when results from the Hubble Space Telescope would become available).

=== Publications ===
Maddox authored and edited numerous publications including:

- Beyond the Energy Crisis
- Revolution in Biology
- The Doomsday Syndrome
- What Remains to Be Discovered: Mapping the Secrets of the Universe, the Origins of Life, and the Future of the Human Race.

== Honours and awards ==
In 1995 Maddox was knighted. In 2000 he was made an honorary Fellow of the Royal Society. His nomination read:

Sir John Maddox is known throughout the world as an outstanding editor and contributor to Nature. His deep understanding of all branches of science is reflected in the lucid expositions of scientific research and discovery which appeared almost weekly in Nature. Under his leadership, Nature grew to become unique among the world's leading scientific publications, covering all fields and circulating internationally. He was Editor from 1966 to 1973, and from 1980 to 1996. Sir John was Director of the Nuffield Foundation Science Teaching Project 1964–66 and director, Nuffield Foundation 1975–1980. He is the author of five books, and many scientific contributions to newspapers and journals. He has also contributed regularly to broadcasting and television, and has a notable record of public service. He has made an outstanding contribution to science both in the UK and internationally and since his retirement from Nature has continued to contribute to science policy.

The John Maddox Prize is named in his honour. The prize is awarded to people who have stood up for science, despite facing difficulty and opposition. He was a Distinguished Supporter of the British Humanist Association, and a trustee of Sense about Science. In 1994 the Committee for Skeptical Inquiry (CSICOP) presented Maddox the Public Education in Science Award.

In April 2011, the executive council of the Committee for Skeptical Inquiry (CSI, formerly CSICOP) selected Maddox for inclusion in CSI's Pantheon of Skeptics. The Pantheon of Skeptics was created by CSI to remember the legacy of deceased fellows of CSI and their contributions to the cause of scientific skepticism.

== Personal life ==
Maddox lived in London, and spent time at his cottage near Brecon in Wales, where he and his wife, Brenda Maddox, were involved in the local community. They had two children, Bronwen and Bruno Maddox. He had two previous children with Nancy Fanning King (Piers Maddox and Joanna Maddox), and two children with Lois Barton (Lois Wheatley and Adrian Maddox).

Preceded by L. J. F. Brimble (1961-1965)	Editor in Chief of Nature; 1965-1973	Succeeded by David 'Dai' Davies (1973-1980)

Preceded by David 'Dai' Davies (1973-1980)	Editor in Chief of Nature; 1980-1995	Succeeded by Philip Campbell (1995-2018)
