= George Maddox =

George Maddox may refer to:

- George Maddox (cricketer) (1811–1867), Australian cricketer
- Buster Maddox (George Woodrow Maddox, 1911–1956), American football player
- George Maddox (architect) (1760–1843), British architect and artist
- George Vaughan Maddox (1802–1864), British architect and builder
