= Brenda Maddox =

American writer and biographer (1932–2019)

Brenda Maddox FRSL
- Born: Brenda Murphy; February 24, 1932; Bridgewater, Massachusetts, U.S.
- Died: June 16, 2019 (aged 87)
- Education: Harvard University; London School of Economics
- Occupations: Biographer; Journalist
- Spouse: John Maddox (m. 1960)
- Children: Bronwen Maddox; Bruno Maddox
- Writing career
- Notable work: Rosalind Franklin: The Dark Lady of DNA
- Notable awards: Suffrage Science award (2011)

Brenda, Lady Maddox FRSL (née Murphy; February 24, 1932 – June 16, 2019) was an American writer and biographer, who spent most of her adult life living and working in the UK, from 1959 until her death. She is best known for her biographies, including of Nora Barnacle, the wife of James Joyce, and for her semi-autobiographical book, The Half-Parent: Living with Other People's Children.

== Education and early life ==
Born Brenda Murphy in Bridgewater, Massachusetts in 1932, she graduated from Harvard University (class of 1953) with a degree in English literature. She also studied at the London School of Economics.

== Career ==
She was a book reviewer for The Observer, The Times, New Statesman, The New York Times, and The Washington Post, and regularly contributed to BBC Radio 4 as a critic and commentator. Her biographies of Elizabeth Taylor, D. H. Lawrence, Nora Joyce, W. B. Yeats and Rosalind Franklin have been widely acclaimed. She received the Los Angeles Times Biography Award, the Silver PEN Award, the French Prix du Meilleur Livre Etranger, and the Whitbread Biography Prize.

Maddox lived in London and spent time at her cottage near Brecon, Wales where she and her husband, Sir John Maddox (d. 2009), were actively involved within the local community. She was vice-president of the Hay-on-Wye Festival of Literature, a member of the Editorial Board of British Journalism Review, and a past chairman of the Broadcasting Press Guild. Maddox had two children and two stepchildren.

Her best-known biography, that of James Joyce's wife Nora Barnacle, was made into a 2000 movie, Nora, starring Susan Lynch in the title role and Ewan McGregor as Joyce.

Her biography of the scientist James Watson was published in 2017.

=== Awards and honours ===
Maddox was elected a Fellow of the Royal Society of Literature (FRSL) in 1999. She won the Suffrage Science award in 2011.

=== Bibliography ===
- Beyond Babel: New Directions in Communications (London: Andre Deutsch, 1972)
- The Half-Parent: Living with Other People's Children (London: Andre Deutsch, 1975)
- Who's Afraid of Elizabeth Taylor? A Myth of Our Time (London: Granada, 1977)
- Nora: A Biography of Nora Joyce (London: Hamish Hamilton, 1988); also published as Nora: The Real Life of Molly Bloom (Boston: Houghton Mifflin, 1988)
- D. H. Lawrence: The Story of a Marriage, UK edition: The Married Man: A Life of D. H. Lawrence (London: Sinclair-Stevenson, 1994)
- Yeats's Ghosts: The Secret Life of W. B. Yeats
- Rosalind Franklin: The Dark Lady of DNA
- "Mother of DNA"
- James Watson (London: Bloomsbury, 2017); (New York: Harper, 2018)
- "The woman who cracked the BBC's glass ceiling"
- Maggie: The First Lady
- "The whole world in his hand" The Times, May 27, 2006
- George Eliot: Novelist, Lover, Wife
- Reading the Rocks: How Victorian Geologists Discovered the Secret of Life
- Freud's Wizard: The Enigma of Ernest Jones

== Personal life ==
Brenda met John Maddox, then a science correspondent for The Guardian, while visiting Europe in 1958. They married in 1960, and settled in London, where she raised two stepchildren and had three more children of her own. She died on June 16, 2019, aged 87.
